= Electoral history of Andrew Little =

List of elections featuring Andrew Little as a candidate

This is a summary of the electoral history of Andrew Little, Leader of the New Zealand Labour Party (2014–2017), President of the New Zealand Labour Party (2009–2011), and a List MP (2011–present).

== Parliamentary elections ==
=== 2011 election ===
General election 2011: New Plymouth
Notes:	Blue background denotes the winner of the electorate vote. Pink background denotes a candidate elected from their party list. Yellow background denotes an electorate win by a list member, or other incumbent. A ✓ or ✗ denotes status of any incumbent, win or lose respectively.						
Party	Candidate	Votes	%	±%	Party votes	%	±%
National	✓ Jonathan Young	17,644	53.31	+5.13	18,073	53.26	+2.79
Labour	Andrew Little	13,374	40.41	−7.47	8,761	25.82	−5.60
Green	Geoff Steedman	1,277	3.86	+3.86	3,276	9.65	+3.23
Legalise Cannabis	Jamie Dombroski	439	1.33	+1.33	178	0.52	+0.05
Independent	Rusty Kane	361	1.09	−1.11			
NZ First					2,137	6.30	+2.25
Conservative Party of New Zealand					667	1.97	+1.97
ACT					347	1.02	−2.16
Māori Party					207	0.61	−0.14
United Future					154	0.45	−0.20
Mana					72	0.21	+0.21
Libertarianz					30	0.09	+0.01
Democrats					19	0.06	−0.07
Alliance					11	0.03	−0.06
Informal votes		808			235		
Total valid votes		33,095			33,932		
National hold	Majority	4,270	12.90	+12.60			

Electorate (as at 26 November 2011): 44,973

=== 2014 election ===
General election 2014: New Plymouth
Notes:	Blue background denotes the winner of the electorate vote. Pink background denotes a candidate elected from their party list. Yellow background denotes an electorate win by a list member, or other incumbent. A ✓ or ✗ denotes status of any incumbent, win or lose respectively.						
Party	Candidate	Votes	%	±%	Party votes	%	±%
National	✓ Jonathan Young	21,566	57.75	+4.14	20,969	55.65	+2.39
Labour	Andrew Little	11,788	31.56	−8.85	7,947	21.10	−4.72
Green	Sarah Roberts	2,025	5.42	+1.56	3,005	7.97	−1.68
Legalise Cannabis	Jamie Dombroski	701	1.88	+0.55	218	0.58	+0.06
Conservative Party of New Zealand	Angela Storr	633	1.69	+1.69	1,201	3.19	+1.22
ACT	James Gray	205	0.55	+0.55	172	0.46	−0.56
NZ First					3,395	9.00	+2.70
Internet Mana					263	0.70	+0.49 (Note: 2014 Internet Mana swing is relative to the votes for Mana in 2011; it shared a party list with Internet in the 2014 election.)
Māori Party					199	0.53	−0.08
United Future					66	0.18	−0.27
Ban 1080					57	0.15	+0.15
Civilian					57	0.15	+0.15
Democrats					28	0.07	+0.01
Independent Coalition					10	0.03	+0.03
Focus					10	0.03	+0.03
Informal votes		429			128		
Total valid votes		37,347			37,681		
Turnout		37,681	77.51	+2.06			
National hold	Majority	9,778	26.18	+13.28			

== Leadership elections ==
=== 2009 presidential election ===
On 2 March 2009 it was announced that Little was elected unopposed as President of the New Zealand Labour Party.

=== 2014 leadership election ===
Labour leadership election results
Section (% weighting)	Candidate	Round 1	Round 2	Round 3
Caucus (40%)	Little	15.63%	34.38%	43.75%
Caucus (40%)	Robertson	43.75%	43.75%	56.25%
Caucus (40%)	Parker	21.88%	21.88%	–
Caucus (40%)	Mahuta	18.75%	–	–
Party (40%)	Little	25.71%	34.11%	44.77%
Party (40%)	Robertson	38.25%	40.92%	55.23%
Party (40%)	Parker	22.41%	24.97%	–
Party (40%)	Mahuta	13.62%	–	–
Union affiliates (20%)	Little	64.12%	70.62%	75.66%
Union affiliates (20%)	Robertson	18.91%	20.20%	24.44%
Union affiliates (20%)	Parker	7.28%	9.18%	–
Union affiliates (20%)	Mahuta	9.70%	–	–
Final result	Little	29.36%	42.52%	50.52%
Final result	Robertson	36.58%	37.91%	49.48%
Final result	Parker	19.17%	20.58%	–
Final result	Mahuta	14.89%	–	–
