= Elsie Andrews =

New Zealand teacher and community leader (1888–1948)

Elsie Euphemia Andrews MBE (23 December 1888 – 26 August 1948) was a New Zealand teacher and community leader.

She was born in Huirangi, Taranaki, New Zealand, on 23 December 1888. Her parents were John Andrews and his wife, Emily Young, who both came from Taranaki pioneering families. Elsie Andrews was the only one of twelve siblings who attended secondary school; she received her education at Huirangi School and with the help of a scholarship, she went on to New Plymouth High School. When she failed entrance examinations to both university and teachers' college, she became a pupil-teacher at Waitara School. After completing her training, she moved around various rural schools before getting a permanent position at New Plymouth's Fitzroy School.

In 1907, Andrews founded the New Plymouth High School Old Girls' Association. The group raised funds for a school hostel, which opened in 1928.

Andrews was a member of the New Zealand Educational Institute and the New Zealand Women Teachers' Association and from 1931 had an active role as secretary in establishing and running the Pan-Pacific Women's Association, later the Pan Pacific and Southeast Asia Women's Association. She was an advocate for the advancement of women's roles in education, and later advocated international peace.

She unsuccessfully contested the New Plymouth electorate in the 1935 election as an Independent; she was one of only three women who stood for election that year.

In the 1938 King's Birthday Honours, Andrews was appointed a Member of the Order of the British Empire.

Andrews died on 26 August 1948 at New Plymouth, having never married.

== Additional reading ==
- Laurie, Alison J. (October 2009), "A transnational conference romance: Elsie Andrews, Hildegarde Kneeland, and the Pan-Pacific Women's Association", Journal of Lesbian Studies, 13 (4): 395–414, doi:10.1080/10894160903048130, PMID 19830617, S2CID 205754231
