= First Pan-Pacific Women's Conference =

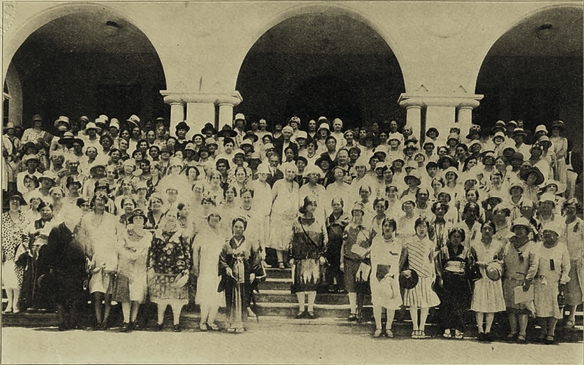
Delegates to the first Pan-Pacific Women's Conference

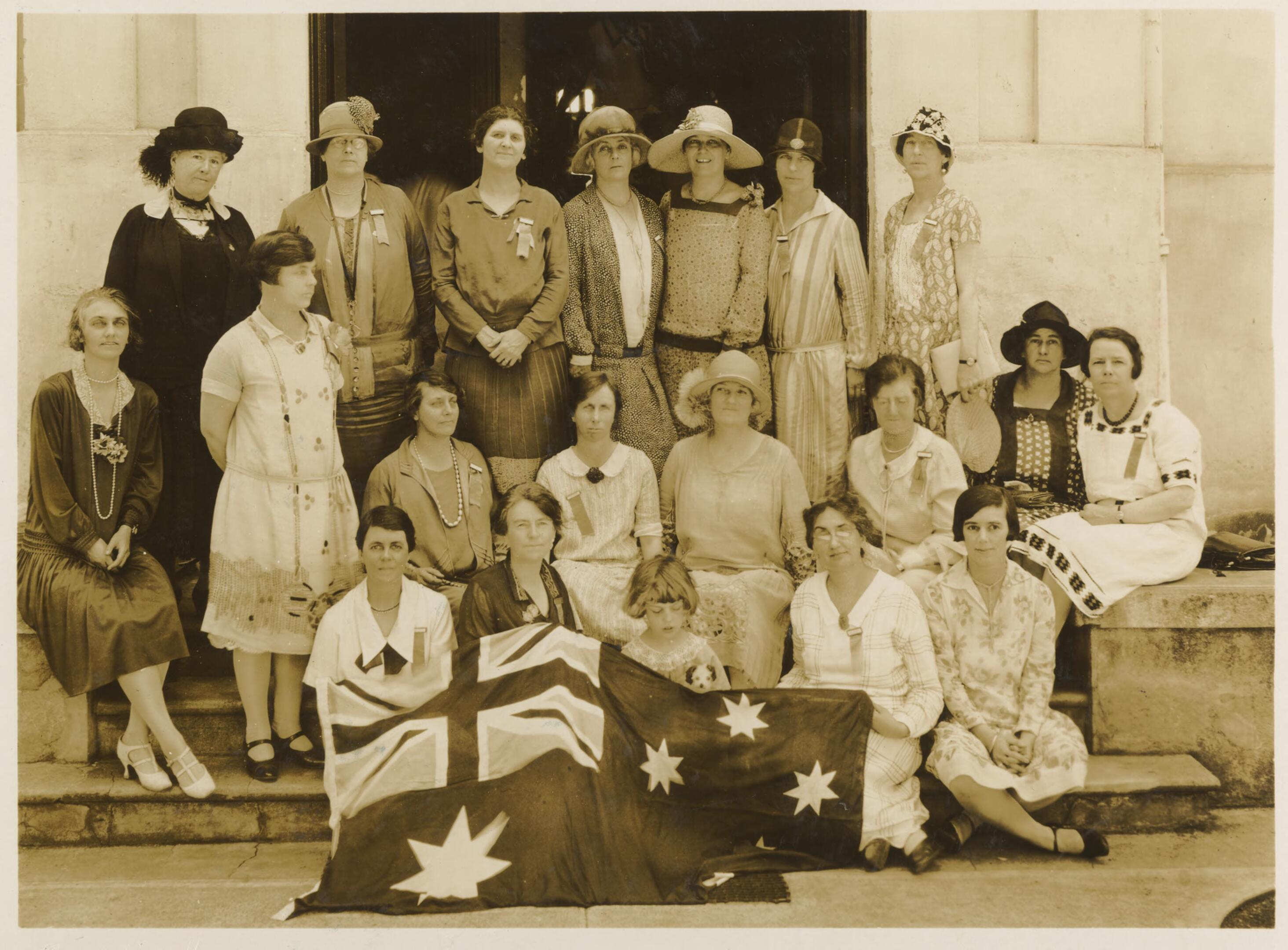
Australian delegates to the inaugural Pan-Pacific Women's Conference in Hawaii in 1928

The Pan-Pacific Women's Conference of 1928 was organised in Honolulu, Territory of Hawaii, at the Punahou Academy on 9–19 August 1928. It was convened under the auspices of the Pan-Pacific Union with the support of the New Zealand Women Teachers' Association. It was the first international women's conference arranged outside of the Western world and in the Pacific region. Subsequent Pan-Pacific Women's Conferences were convened by the Pan-Pacific Women's Association and the later by the Pan Pacific and Southeast Asia Women's Association. Jane Addams was the conference's international chair. Mrs. Francis M. Swanzy served as Honorary Chair of the Conference Committee and Mrs. A. L. Andrews served as Chair of the Conference Committee.

== Resolutions ==
These resolutions of the general session were unanimously adopted:

1. That the following projects be promoted :

- A correlated inquiry into costs and standards of living in Pacific countries with special reference to diet content .
- A study of standards of living and wages in Pacific countries which will make comparison possible .
- A survey of the health of women in industry in Pacific countries through an expert committee with Pan-Pacific links forged through this conference.
- Formation of a committee of experts for the initiation of health research projects of value to Pacific women.
- Research regarding electoral systems, women's place in political parties, effect of compulsory voting, and legislation relating to women and children.

2. That the interest of existing research bodies in Pacific countries be enlisted in consultation with national groups, toward best policies to be pursued to- ward improvement of industrial standards in Pacific countries.

3. That committees be set up in accordance with the desires of the sections of Industry and Education for the purpose of acting as clearing houses.

4. That the following resolutions be adopted:

- Women in countries of the Pacific should work toward an educational program which will help to prepare social workers for more effective service, such recommendation in no way reflecting upon the valuable work of large num- bers of voluntary or untrained workers who are rendering unselfish and effective service in many places, but enabling those deserving to secure special training in social service to receive it without the expense of travel to another country, and enabling them to acquire field experience in those countries in which their services are to be rendered .
- That this Conference urges all women to draw the attention of official agencies to the findings of the Child Welfare Committee of the League of Nations appointed to investigate the Cinema question, and the report of the Royal Com- mission appointed by the Australian Federal Government to inquire into the Film Industry in Australia .
- That this Conference urges women of the Pacific basin to do all in their power to influence their governments to carry out the recommendations of the League of Nations report on the Traffic in Women and Children, including those urging the employment of women police and the abolition of state regulation and of licensed houses .
- That the Pan-Pacific Conference of Women is of the opinion that it would be of great value to the countries of the Pacific Basin if the body of experts on Traffic in Women and Children of the League of Nations would continue to investigate thoroughly, conditions in those countries within this area which have not already been examined .
- In view of the fact that there has been serious criticism at this Conference of the films sent to the several countries of the Pacific Basin, the Pan - Pacific Conference of Women requests Will H. Hayes, director of motion picture industry in the United States, to confine the distribution of films in the Pacific countries to those that reflect the best and not the worst in life . That a resolution from the Pan - Pacific Women's Conference be sent to the director of the British Film Industry asking that no films which would bring discredit to the moral standard of Great Britain be sent to other countries .

== Recommendations ==
These recommendations constituted a basis for continuation work in the Sections named and amplifying the general terms of the resolutions.

=== Government section ===
The Women in Government Section during its deliberations came to the conclusion that in the enfranchised countries, there was a great deal of latent power in the political machinery which women had not yet fully learned to use. Political consciousness needed to be fostered in these countries, so as to arouse a sense of public responsibility both in national and world affairs. They stressed the need for educative means of bringing this about.

This conference desired to uphold the women in Pacific countries who were seeking enfranchisement and trusted that their efforts would quickly become successful.

Every means should be used to promote the responsible participation of women in government.

The women in the Government Section who belong to countries which are trustees for the welfare of the Pacific, recognize the duty of doing their part to see that the principles underlying the League of Nations mandates are applied in the letter and the spirit over the whole area.

The Government Section suggested that in the interval between this and a next Women's Pan-Pacific Conference, research be made regarding electoral systems, woman's place in political parties, and the possible effect of compulsory voting, as well as upon other matters that need changes in legislation to promote the welfare of women and children, carrying out any recommendations suggested by the other sections of this Conference.

=== Industry section ===
The Industry Section submitted the following:

1. In case a permanent organization be effected, an industrial committee be appointed consisting of three representatives in each country whose functions would be:

- To accumulate, and through the permanent secretariat, circulate among the countries represented existing information on industrial conditions.
- To be on the lookout in each country for effects of economic relations with some other country, reporting any findings to the secretariat.
- Through the secretariat, to cooperate with the Labor office of the League of Nations in its attempts to improve conditions by international legislation.

2. The Industrial Section recognized the need of research before an adequate discussion of Pacific industrial conditions was possible. It, therefore, recommended that the permanent committee of the Pan-Pacific Women's Conference make arrangements with research bodies for making the necessary studies, in consultation with the national committees of the countries in which such studies would be made. The following subjects were suggested:

- A study of the standards of living and wages in Pacific countries which will make comparisons possible.
- The best policies to be pursued toward improvement of industrial standards in Pacific countries.

=== Education section ===
Inasmuch as the vital problems of health, social service, industry and governments are fundamentally problems of education in its broadest outlook, and in order that those sections may profit by the most efficient and progressively up-to-date educational methods, the Education Section recommends the formation of a committee, composed of representatives from each country, which will undertak :

- To list educational agencies, formal and informal, and indicate their function.
- To pool information as to national problems and methods in education.
- To suggest problems for research in order of urgency in relation to Pacific countries, e.g. training by life activities in character formation and in leadership; economics; vocational education and guidance; leisure-time activities; and to promote international exchange of teachers and educational leaders.
