= Ida Gaskin =

New Zealand politician and teacher (1919–2016)

Ida Gaskin CNZM
- Born: Ida Margaret Jacobs; 9 December 1919; Pontardawe, Glamorgan, Wales
- Died: 8 January 2016 (aged 96); New Plymouth, New Zealand
- Occupation: Schoolteacher
- Known for: Winner of New Zealand Mastermind (1983)

Ida Margaret Gaskin CNZM (née Jacobs, 9 December 1919 – 8 January 2016) was a Welsh-born New Zealand schoolteacher and politician. She was known for her knowledge of Shakespeare, and for becoming the first woman in New Zealand to win the local version of Mastermind.

== Early life and family ==
Gaskin was born in Pontardawe, a steel mill town in Glamorgan, Wales in 1919, the daughter of Edward Jacobs and Edith Jacobs (née Skinner), and grew up there during the Great Depression. For much of her childhood her father, a steel worker, was unemployed. She won a scholarship to the University of London, graduating with an honours degree in English, and trained as a teacher at the Institute of Education. Emigrating to New Zealand on the RMS Rangitata in 1946, she met and married Victor Gaskin in Havelock North, and they moved to New Plymouth in 1961. The couple had five children, but separated in 1977 and later divorced.

== Teaching career ==
Gaskin taught at schools in London during World War II. In New Zealand, she taught English at New Plymouth Girls' High School, as well as a Shakespeare module at New Plymouth Boys' High School, where her pupils included Andrew Little. She served as national junior vice president of the Post Primary Teachers' Association in 1976, national president in 1977 and senior vice president in 1978.

== Mastermind ==
In 1983, Gaskin competed on and won the New Zealand version of the television quiz show Mastermind, with the specialist subject of the works of Shakespeare. She was the first woman to win Mastermind in New Zealand.

== Political career ==
A lifelong socialist, Gaskin stood for Parliament as the Labour Party candidate for New Plymouth at the 1984 general election, losing to incumbent Tony Friedlander by 269 votes. She also served as a New Plymouth councillor.

== Death ==
Gaskin died on 8 January 2016.

== Honours ==
In the 1997 New Year Honours, Gaskin was appointed a Companion of the New Zealand Order of Merit, for services to education and the community. She was awarded an honorary doctorate by the University of Waikato in 2002.
