= Darien Fenton =

New Zealand politician

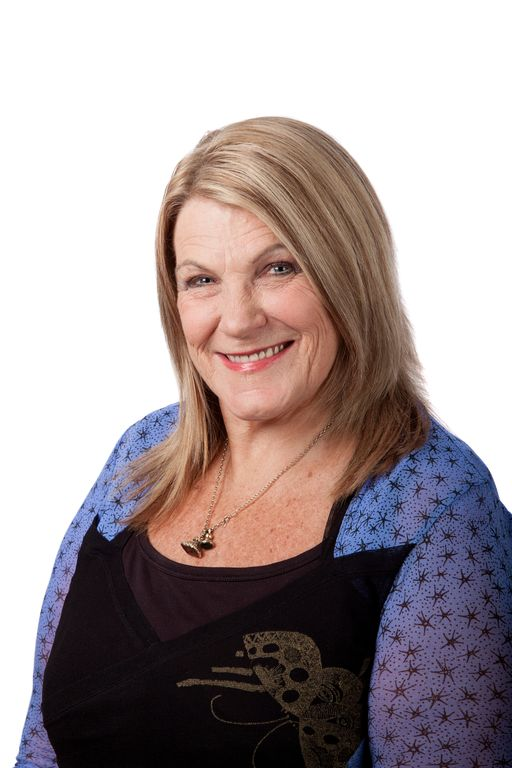

Member of the New Zealand Parliament for Labour party list
- In office 17 September 2005 – 20 September 2014

Personal details
- Born: 25 February 1954 (age 72)
- Party: Labour
- Relations: Fred Frost (grandfather)
- Website: darienfenton.org.nz

Darien Elizabeth Fenton (born 25 February 1954) is a New Zealand politician and was a Member of Parliament from 2005 until her retirement in 2014.

== Personal life and early career ==
Fenton's grandfather, Fred Frost, was a Labour MP for New Plymouth from 1938 to 1943. Fenton is of Māori descent.

Fenton grew up in a Palmerston North state house. On her entry to parliament in 2005, a newspaper claimed that she might have the "most varied CV of any newcomer to Parliament", including extensive travels, and work as an extra in India in Bollywood movies and as an administrative research assistant to the Tower of London's master of armouries. In 2014 she admitted that her varied experiences in the 1970s had also left her with a heroin addiction, and that the New Zealand health-funded methadone programme '"...saved my life"'.

Before entering parliament she was active in the trade union movement, and held the offices of National Secretary of the Service & Food Workers Union Nga Ringa Tota (SFWU), and vice-president of the Council of Trade Unions. She is also the Vice-President of the Labour Party Union Affiliates Council.

== Member of Parliament ==
New Zealand Parliament
Years	Term	Electorate	List	Party
2005–2008	48th	List	43	Labour
2008–2011	49th	List	33	Labour
2011–2014	50th	List	18	Labour

Fenton stood as a list candidate for the Labour Party in the 2005 election, being ranked 43rd, and was elected to Parliament.

In 2006, her Minimum Wage and Remuneration Amendment Bill, which extended the minimum wage to contractors, was drawn from the member's ballot. The bill was sent to select committee, but the committee could not reach agreement on whether it should be passed. It was subsequently voted down by the National coalition government after the 2008 election.

In the 2008 election she stood unsuccessfully against National Party leader John Key in Helensville. Due to her place of 33 on the Labour list, she was returned to parliament.

In 2009 Fenton's Employment Relations (Statutory Minimum Redundancy Entitlements) Amendment Bill was drawn from the member's ballot. It was defeated at its first reading in May 2010.

In 2011, Fenton received public backlash when she commented on Sir Peter Leitch (known as The Mad Butcher for his chain of butchery shops) after he publicly stated he supported Prime Minister John Key. Fenton stated she would "never go near him again" and would refuse to buy anything from his stores. Fenton later apologised for her comments on the Labour Party blog.

In 2012, Fenton backed a bill that would have stopped libraries from charging for access to material and the internet. It failed at its first reading 61–60.

In May 2014, Fenton announced she would not stand for re-election at the 2014 election. Since leaving Parliament Fenton has returned to Union activism currently working as National Campaign Director for the Meat Workers Union. In this role she has been campaigning for key changes in workplace safety legislation before Parliament putting greater responsibility on workplace management to ensure injured and ill employees can get access to medical treatment.
