= 1938 Birthday Honours (New Zealand) =

Awards list for New Zealand

The 1938 King's Birthday Honours in New Zealand, celebrating the official birthday of King George VI, were appointments made by the King to various orders and honours to reward and highlight good works by New Zealanders. They were announced on 9 June 1938.

The recipients of honours are displayed here as they were styled before their new honour.

== Knight Bachelor ==
- Albert Fuller Ellis CMG – of Auckland; New Zealand member of the British Phosphate Commission.
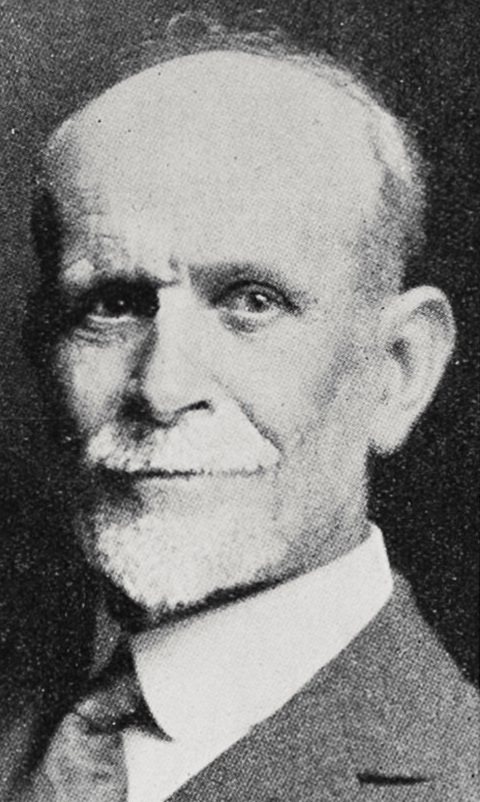
Sir Albert Ellis

== Order of Saint Michael and Saint George ==
=== Companion (CMG) ===
- Richard Oliver Gross – of Auckland; a prominent sculptor.
- John Wood MICE – engineer-in-chief and under-secretary of the Public Works Department.

== Order of the British Empire ==
=== Knight Commander (KBE) ===
Civil division

- Professor Thomas Hill Easterfleld PhD FIC – of Nelson; formerly director of the Cawthron Institute of Scientific Research.
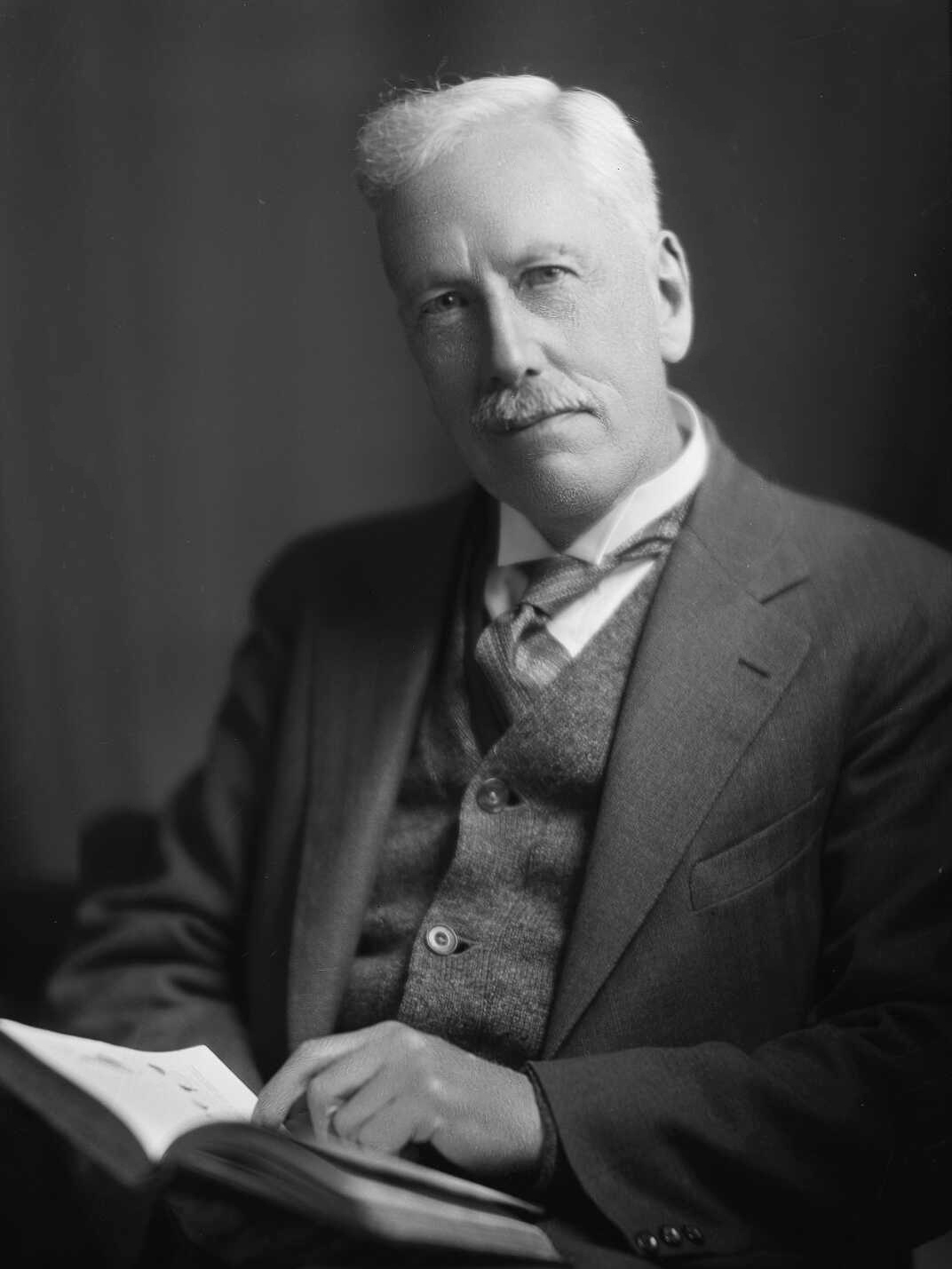
Sir Thomas Easterfield

=== Commander (CBE) ===
Civil division

- Annie Elizabeth Kelly – of Christchurch; a prominent artist.
- William Sanderson La Trobe – of Wellington; formerly superintendent of technical education, Education Department.
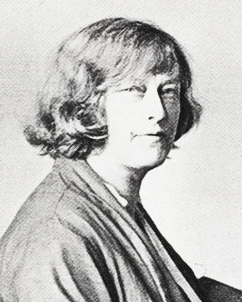
Elizabeth Kelly

=== Officer (OBE) ===
Civil division

- Sadie Macdonald – of Wellington. For social-welfare services.
- James Wallace JP – of Dunedin; chairman of the Otago Education Board.

Military division

- Major Eric Freeman Clayton-Greene – officer commanding 2nd Medium Battery, New Zealand Artillery (Territorial Force); of Hamilton.

=== Member (MBE) ===
Civil division

- Elsie Euphemia Andrews – formerly infant mistress, Fitzroy School, New Plymouth
- John Connell Brown – of Westport. For social-welfare services.
- Robina Thomson Cameron – of Rotorua; district health nurse.
- Katharina Margarita Finnane – matron of Porirua Mental Hospital.
- John Henry O'Donnell – of Wellington; formerly assistant under-secretary, Lands and Survey Department.

Military division

- Paymaster-Lieutenant Herbert Russell Sleeman – New Zealand Division of the Royal Navy; assistant naval secretary, Wellington.
- Warrant Officer William Stanley Simpson – Royal New Zealand Air Force; of Christchurch.

== British Empire Medal ==
Civil division

- Staff Sergeant-Major Edward James Barwell – senior orderly, Government House, Wellington.
