= Richard Gross (sculptor) =

New Zealand sculptor

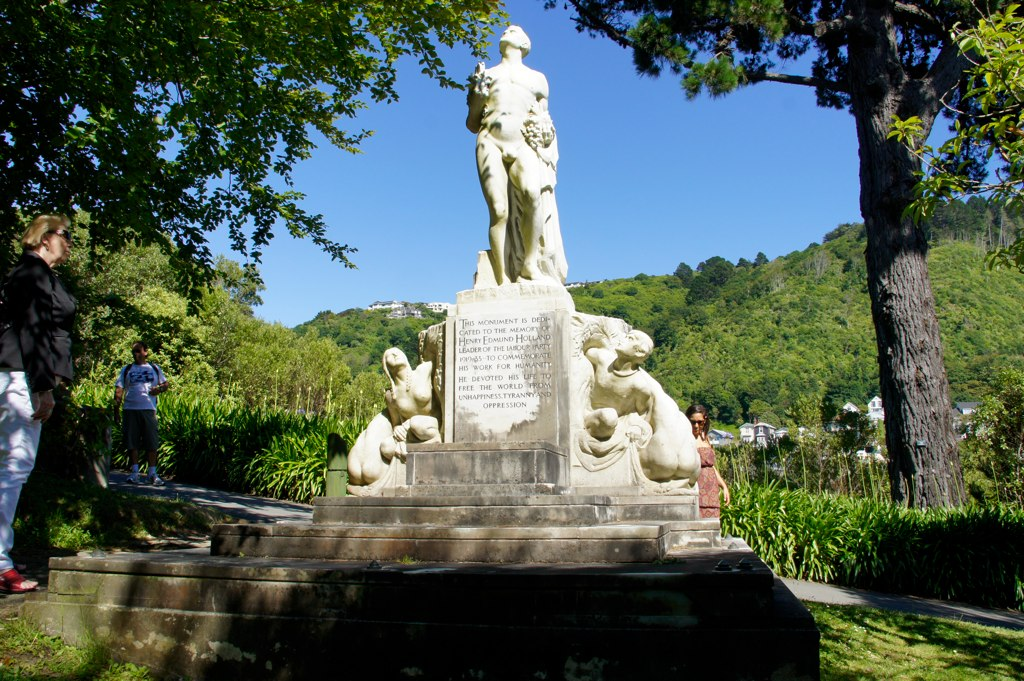
Holland memorial at Bolton Street Cemetery in Wellington, New Zealand

Richard Oliver Gross CMG (10 January 1882 – 27 December 1964) was a New Zealand farmer and sculptor.

== Life and career ==
He was born in Barrow-in-Furness, Lancashire, England, on 10 January 1882. He moved to New Zealand in 1914.

Gross sculpted the following works:

- The figure of Endeavour on the Auckland Grammar School war memorial, Auckland.
- The figure of Sacrifice on the Cambridge war memorial.
- The lion at the base of the Dunedin Cenotaph.
- The fountain at the National War Memorial carillon, Wellington.
- The bronze frieze around the Havelock North memorial.
- The stone frieze on the Auckland War Memorial Museum, Auckland.
- Elements on the Wellington cenotaph include the two panels of a call-to-arms relief and the equestrian figure on top, the 'Will to Peace'. After the Second World War, Gross added the bronze lions to the cenotaph.
- The Athlete and The Swan on the Elliot Memorial gates, Auckland Domain, Auckland.
- The marble memorial to the Labour leader Harry Holland, in the Bolton Street Cemetery, Wellington.
- The Davis Memorial Fountain at Mission Bay, Auckland.
- The bronze Maori chief for the One Tree Hill memorial, Auckland.
- The figure of love and justice for the memorial to Michael Joseph Savage at Bastion Point, Auckland.
- Carving at the entrance to the Hercus Building, University of Otago Medical School.

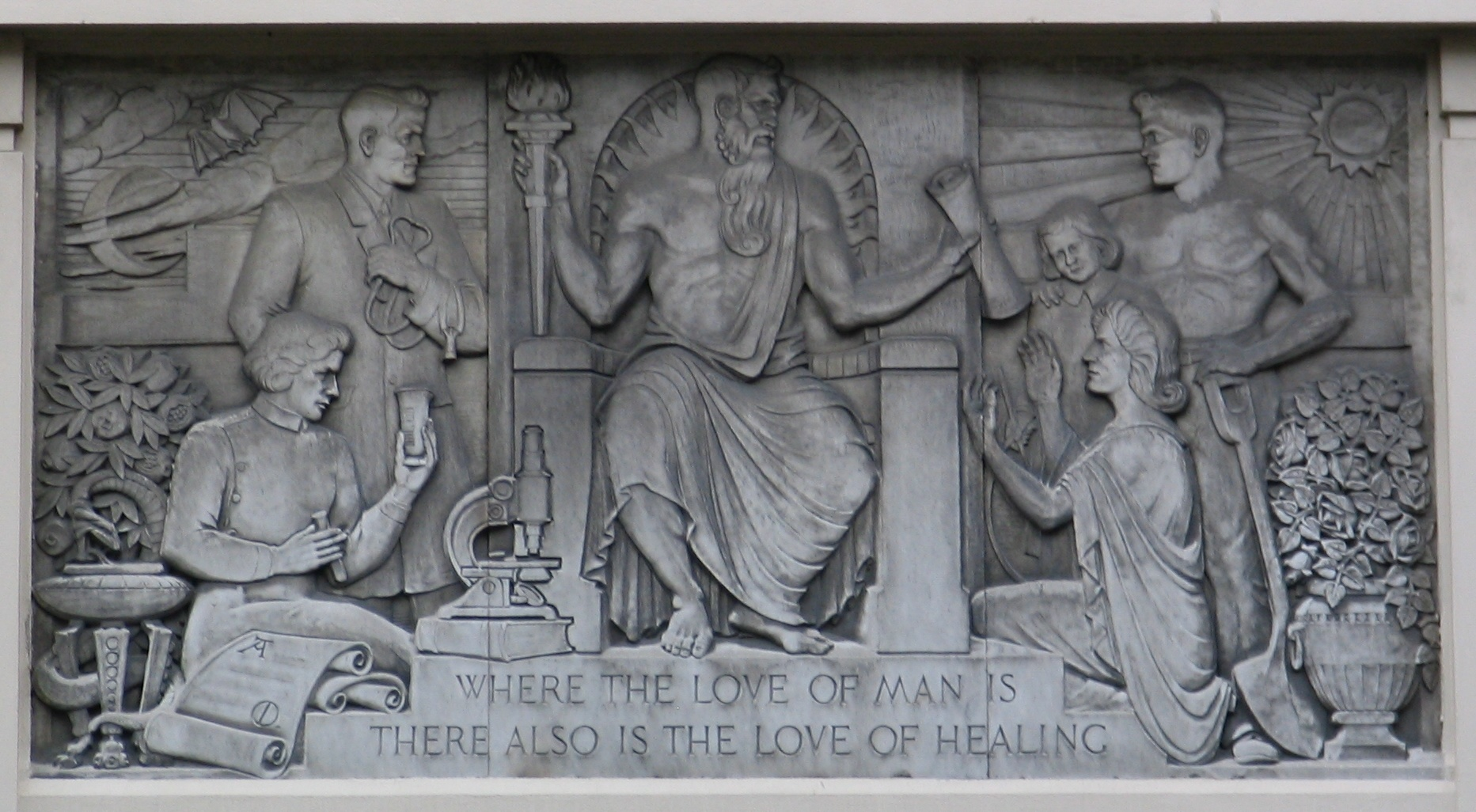
University of Otago Hercus Building carving

== Honours and awards ==
In the 1938 King's Birthday Honours, Gross was appointed a Companion of the Order of St Michael and St George, in recognition of his services as a sculptor. In 1953, he was awarded the Queen Elizabeth II Coronation Medal.
