= David MacLeod =

New Zealand National Party politician (born 1967 or 1968)

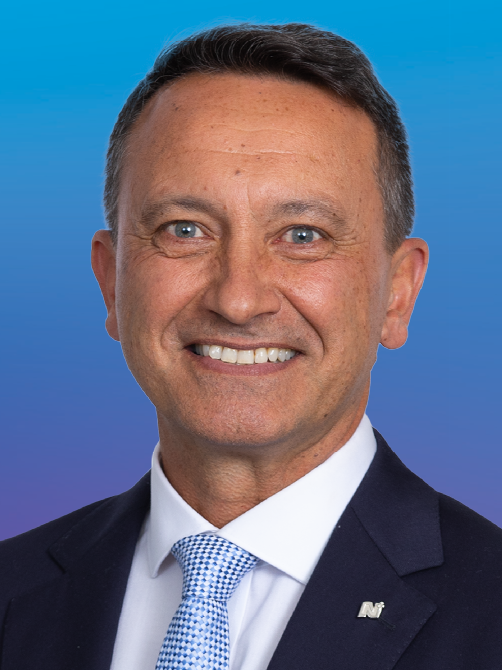
- MacLeod in 2023

Member of the New Zealand Parliament for New Plymouth
- Incumbent
- Assumed office 14 October 2023
- Preceded by: Glen Bennett

3rd Chair of Taranaki Regional Council
- In office 2007–2022
- Preceded by: David Walter
- Succeeded by: Charlotte Littlewood

Personal details
- Born: 1967 or 1968 (age 58–59) Hāwera, New Zealand
- Party: National
- Spouse: Leasa
- Children: 3

David Nigel MacLeod (born 1967 or 1968) is a New Zealand businessman and politician. Since 2023, he is the Member of Parliament in the House of Representatives for New Plymouth, representing the National Party. He previously served as chair of the Taranaki Regional Council from 2007 to 2022.

== Early life and career ==
MacLeod, of Ngāti Mutunga, Ngāi Tahu, and Ngāti Porou descent, was born in Hāwera and raised on his family's farm in Manaia. He is the seventh of eight children born to Joy Rangimarie TePoi MacLeod and Thomas Nigel MacLeod.

His maternal grandfather was Ned Ellison, a doctor and health administrator. The National Party Member of Parliament for Egmont and Waitotara Venn Young was his godfather. MacLeod is married to Leasa; they share three children.

MacLeod attended Hawera High School and then completed an electrician apprenticeship with Greaves Electrical. He became a partner in the firm in 1991 and became managing director in 1999. Under his leadership, MacLeod expanded the business to include a lines company. He stepped down from management in 2012 and sold the business in 2023.

== Local government and governance career ==
In 2000, MacLeod was elected to the South Taranaki constituency of the Taranaki Regional Council in a by-election following the death of councillor Ralph Latta. He was re-elected in 2001, 2004, and 2007. After the 2007 election, he was unanimously elected as council chair. MacLeod was returned unopposed at the 2010 election and also reappointed as chair.

As a Taranaki district councillor, MacLeod voted against the creation of a Taranaki Māori constituency in 2011, saying it was his preference to foster relationships between the council and local iwi. As chair, MacLeod led on regional co-governance measures including the appointment of iwi representatives to council committees. He changed his mind to support the creation of a Māori constituency in 2021, when the proposal was supported by all eight Taranaki iwi, despite holding a personal view that the Māori constituency system is "flawed".

MacLeod continued on the council, and as chair, until 2022, when he did not run for re-election. After his re-election in 2019, a rival candidate complained to the Auditor-General that council advertising featuring MacLeod's image had given him an unfair advantage. The Auditor-General advised the council that it may wish to reconsider its policy on pre-election advertising.

While holding local government office, MacLeod served as a director of the council-owned Port Taranaki from 2001 to 2023. He was also elected as a member of the Fonterra board in 2011. He was the first Māori director of the co-operative. He stepped down from the board in 2017, after completing two terms. MacLeod's election to the board was controversial because although he occupied a farmer-representative position he was not a farmer, and because the Taranaki Regional Council he chaired had recently invested in Fonterra bonds. He was appointed to the board of Predator Free 2050 in 2016 and became acting chair in 2021, stepping down in 2022 to run for parliament.

== Member of Parliament ==
New Zealand Parliament
Years	Term	Electorate	List	Party
2023–2026	54th	New Plymouth	67	National
2026–present	55th	New Plymouth	45	National

On 31 October 2022, MacLeod was selected as National's candidate for New Plymouth at the 2023 New Zealand general election. When his campaign was announced, MacLeod identified Taranaki roads, increasing the number of immigrants available to the workforce, and the oil and gas industry as areas he was keen to work on when in parliament. During the campaign he ran afoul of signage rules by placing his signs outside the designated timeframe and using incorrect font sizes.

MacLeod was listed low on the party list at 67 out of 74, due to the expectation he would win his electorate; it was a placement that former MP and political editor Claudette Hauiti said should have McLeod "fuming", but which he said was "irrelevant" as it showed the party was confident he would win the electoral seat. On election night MacLeod beat incumbent Labour MP Glen Bennett by a margin of 6,991 votes.

MacLeod was appointed the chair of the environment committee and a member of the finance and expenditure committee. He was stood down from his committee roles on 21 May 2024 after failing to declare 19 donations totalling $178,394. On 7 June 2024, the Electoral Commission referred MacLeod to the Police over the undeclared donations. MacLeod maintained that his failure to declare the donations was a genuine mistake and stated that he hope the investigation would make it clear that he did not intend to deceive anyone. On 29 August 2024, the Police concluded their investigation into MacLeod's donations and declined to take further action. Following the Police decision, MacLeod was appointed as a member of the regulations review and Māori affairs committees.

During the 2026 New Zealand general election, MacLeod contested the New Plymouth electorate for National. He was ranked 45th on the National Party list. On 7 November, MacLeod retained New Plymouth by a large margin of 7,768 votes.

New Zealand Parliament
Preceded by Glen Bennett	Member of Parliament for New Plymouth; 2023–present	Incumbent
