= John Armstrong (New Zealand politician) =

New Zealand politician (1935–2018)

John Gordon Armstrong QSO JP

Member of the New Zealand Parliament
- In office 1990–1993
- Constituency: New Plymouth

Personal details
- Born: 29 March 1935
- Died: 5 December 2018 (aged 83)
- Party: National Party
- Occupation: Politician
- Known for: MP for New Plymouth (1990–1993)

John Gordon Armstrong QSO JP (29 March 1935 – 5 December 2018) was a New Zealand politician of the National Party.

== Member of Parliament ==
New Zealand Parliament
Years	Term	Electorate	Party
1990–1993	43rd	New Plymouth	National

He represented the electorate of New Plymouth in Parliament from 1990 to 1993, when he was defeated by the previous Labour MP, Harry Duynhoven.

He was one of six one-term National MPs who were elected in a swing against Labour in the 1990 election.

Born on 29 March 1935 in Wanganui, Armstrong was educated at Wanganui Collegiate School.

In the 2006 Queen's Birthday Honours, Armstrong was appointed a Companion of the Queen's Service Order for community service. He died in New Plymouth on 5 December 2018.

New Zealand Parliament
Preceded by Harry Duynhoven	Member of Parliament for New Plymouth; 1990–1993	Succeeded by Harry Duynhoven
