= William La Trobe =

William Sanderson La Trobe CBE (15 October 1870 – 27 September 1943) was a New Zealand school principal and educational administrator. He was born in Ngaroto, Waikato, New Zealand, on 15 October 1870.

In the 1938 King's Birthday Honours, La Trobe was appointed a Commander of the Order of the British Empire.
