= Michael Myers (judge) =

New Zealand chief justice (1873–1950)

The Right Honourable Sir Michael Myers GCMG KC
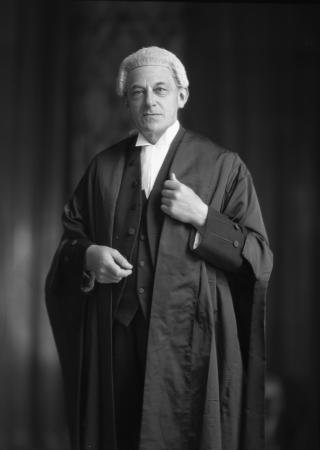

6th Chief Justice of New Zealand
- In office 3 May 1929 – 7 August 1946
- Nominated by: Joseph Ward
- Appointed by: Sir Charles Fergusson
- Preceded by: Charles Skerrett
- Succeeded by: Humphrey O'Leary

Personal details
- Born: 7 September 1873 Motueka, New Zealand
- Died: 8 April 1950 (aged 76) Wellington, New Zealand
- Spouse: Estelle Miriam Salom (m. 1899)
- Relatives: Phoebe Myers (sister); Maurice Salom (father-in-law)

Sir Michael Myers GCMG KC (7 September 1873 – 8 April 1950), also known as Mickey Myers, was the sixth Chief Justice of the Supreme Court of New Zealand from 1929 to 1946 and served occasionally as Administrator of New Zealand from 1930 to 1941. He was the first Jew to hold this position. He sat on the Judicial Committee of the Privy Council in 1936.

Born in Motueka, Myers was educated at Thorndon School and Wellington College, and gained his LLB from Canterbury College in 1897. Afterwards he was admitted to the Inner Temple.

Myers lived in Wellington. He went to the 1945 San Francisco conference that produced the United Nations, and participated in the drafting of the constitution of the International Court of Justice. He resigned on 6 September 1945, but was reappointed for one year, and then resigned on 7 August 1946. Myers died in Wellington in 1950, aged 76. He had been made King's Counsel in 1922, Knight Commander of the Order of St Michael and St George in the 1930 New Year Honours, and promoted to Knight Grand Cross of the Order of St Michael and St George in the 1937 Coronation Honours.

== Family ==
On 2 August 1899 he married Estelle Miriam Salom (24 February 1876 – 11 May 1960), daughter of Maurice Salom, MLC of Adelaide, South Australia. There were two sons: Maurice Salom Myers (1900–1986) and Geoffrey Alexander Myers (1908–2002). Myer's sister Phoebe Myers was a notable educationalist, who represented New Zealand at the League of Nations in 1929.

Legal offices
Preceded by Charles Skerrett	Chief Justice of New Zealand; 1929–1946	Succeeded by Humphrey O'Leary
