= Glen Bennett =

New Zealand Labour Party politician elected in 2020

Glen Bennett MP
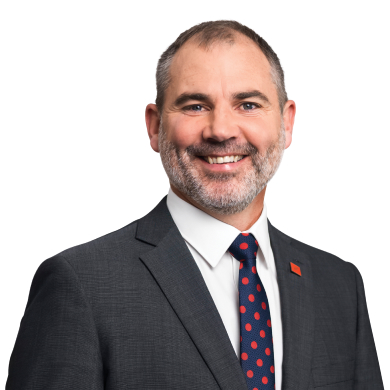
- Bennett in 2023

Member of the New Zealand Parliament for Labour Party list
- Incumbent
- Assumed office 25 March 2024
- Preceded by: Grant Robertson (Note: Normally, list MPs do not have individual predecessors or successors, but Robertson resigned during a sitting parliament and therefore was succeeded by Bennett.)

Member of the New Zealand Parliament for New Plymouth
- In office 17 October 2020 – 14 October 2023
- Preceded by: Jonathan Young
- Succeeded by: David MacLeod
- Majority: 2,555

Personal details
- Born: Glen Thomas Bennett; 1975 or 1976 (age 50–51) Dunedin, New Zealand
- Party: Labour
- Spouse: Jon O'Neill (m. 2021)

Glen Thomas Bennett (born 1975 or 1976) is a New Zealand politician and a member of the Labour Party. He was elected the Member of the Parliament for New Plymouth at the 2020 New Zealand general election, defeating the National candidate and incumbent Jonathan Young. He lost his seat to David MacLeod in the 2023 general election, but re-entered parliament on the list in March 2024 following the retirement of Grant Robertson. Prior to entering politics, Bennett worked in the community sector for more than 20 years.

== Early life ==
Bennett was born in Dunedin. His parents were officers in The Salvation Army and frequently moved around the country. He attended Dominion Road School in Auckland, Shirley Boys' High School in Christchurch, and Rongotai College in Wellington. He spent two years working in television production, including such shows as Showcase, Fair Go, and McPhail and Gadsby. After witnessing poverty in Donetsk, Ukraine, on a trip with the Salvation Army in 2002, Bennett decided to foster troubled teen boys.

== Political career ==
New Zealand Parliament
Years	Term	Electorate	List	Party
2020–2023	53rd	New Plymouth	72	Labour
2024–2026	54th	List	29	Labour
2026–present	55th	List	25	Labour

=== First term, 2020–2023 ===
In late 2019, Bennett ran unopposed for the Labour nomination for the New Plymouth seat. At the 2020 New Zealand general election, New Plymouth was not tipped as a seat to flip to Labour, with the party not having held the seat since 2008. However, Bennett defeated the incumbent National Party MP Jonathan Young by a margin of 2,555 votes.

During the 2023 New Zealand general election, Bennett was unseated by National Party candidate David MacLeod, who won by a margin of 6,991 votes.

=== Second term, 2024–2026 ===
On 20 February 2024, Grant Robertson announced that he would be retiring from Parliament in March 2024 to assume the position of Vice-Chancellor of the University of Otago. Since Robertson was a list candidate, Bennett re-entered Parliament on the Labour Party list as next in line. Bennett assumed the economic development and associate energy portfolios after re-entering Parliament.

On 8 March 2025, Bennett gained the tourism and hospitality portfolio during a shadow cabinet reshuffle. He lost the economic development and associate energy portfolios. On 11 March 2025, he was appointed Senior Whip of the Labour Party.

=== Third term, 2026–present ===
During the 2026 New Zealand general election, Bennett contested the Coromandel electorate for Labour. He was ranked 25th on the Labour Party list. On 7 November, Bennett came second place with 7,072 votes based on preliminary results. Scott Simpson retained the electorate for National. However, he was re-elected to Parliament on the Labour party list.

== Personal life ==
Bennett is openly gay, and became engaged to fiancé Jon O'Neill after a proposal on stage at a Troy Kingi concert in New Plymouth. During the 2020 general election campaign, Bennett was accosted by a member of the public about his sexuality, which led to Andrew Little's stepping in to stop the abuse. After being delayed twice due to the COVID-19 pandemic, Bennett and O'Neill were married at Parliament on 8 February 2021, the day before Bennett's maiden speech.

== Notes ==
New Zealand Parliament
Preceded by Jonathan Young	Member of Parliament for New Plymouth; 2020–2023	Succeeded by David MacLeod
