= Harry Duynhoven =

New Zealand politician

The Honourable Harry Duynhoven QSO
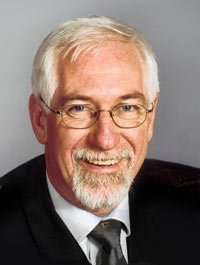

Mayor of New Plymouth
- In office 2010–2013
- Preceded by: Peter Tennent
- Succeeded by: Andrew Judd

Councillor of the New Plymouth District
- Incumbent
- Assumed office 11 March 2015
- Preceded by: John McLeod and Len Howners

Member of the New Zealand Parliament for New Plymouth
- In office 1987–1990
- Preceded by: Tony Friedlander
- Succeeded by: John Armstrong
- Majority: 5,439 (16.5%)
- In office 1993–2008
- Preceded by: John Armstrong
- Succeeded by: Jonathan Young

Personal details
- Born: 22 June 1955 (age 71) New Plymouth, New Zealand
- Party: Labour
- Profession: Electrician

Harry James Duynhoven QSO (born 22 June 1955) is a New Zealand politician and member of the New Zealand Labour Party. He was the mayor of New Plymouth from 2010 to 2013. He was a Member of Parliament for the New Plymouth electorate from 1987 to 1990, from 1993 to 2003, and again from 2003 to 2008.

Duynhoven was elected as mayor of New Plymouth in October 2010 but was defeated after serving a single term. He was elected as a councillor for the city ward of the New Plymouth District Council in a by-election, and was re-elected to that role and elected as a board member on the Taranaki District Health Board in 2016 and 2019.

== Early life ==
Duynhoven was born in New Plymouth on 22 June 1955. He left Spotswood College at age sixteen to become an electrician, and eventually became a technical teacher at the collegiate and polytechnic level.

== Member of Parliament ==
New Zealand Parliament
Years	Term	Electorate	List	Party
1987–1990	42nd	New Plymouth		Labour
1993–1996	44th	New Plymouth		Labour
1996–1999	45th	New Plymouth	none	Labour
1999–2002	46th	New Plymouth	29	Labour
2002–2005	47th	New Plymouth	none	Labour
2005–2008	48th	New Plymouth	none	Labour

Duynhoven entered Parliament in the 1987 election, winning the New Plymouth seat from incumbent National Party MP, Tony Friedlander. In the 1990 election, he lost the seat to National's John Armstrong, but won it back in the 1993 election. In the 2008 election he lost to New Zealand National Party candidate, Jonathan Young by 105 votes, the smallest margin in the election.

In 2003, Duynhoven raised with the Speaker of Parliament his status, and whether he might have breached electoral law, thus disqualifying him from retaining his seat. The Speaker was responsible for determining whether a vacancy existed. This matter arose after Duynhoven applied to resume his citizenship of the Netherlands. His father was from the Netherlands, and Duynhoven had possessed citizenship from birth, but had temporarily lost it due to a change of Dutch law. According to electoral law, applying for foreign citizenship would disqualify Duynhoven from retaining his seat. The Speaker ruled on 23 July 2003 that Parliament's Privileges Committee, who were until 2002 responsible for determining whether a vacancy exists, would consider the matter, and that he would be guided by their report. The Solicitor General advised the Privileges Committee that the law was clear, and that Duynhoven's seat became vacant on 11 June 2003. The majority decision of the Privileges Committee was that Duynhoven was disqualified from holding his seat, and that it had accordingly been vacated. However the government introduced an act retroactively amending the law, to allow Duynhoven to resume his seat.

Duynhoven served as a Minister outside Cabinet of Helen Clark's Labour Government with the portfolio of Associate Minister of Transport, and later, Minister for Transport Safety and Associate Minister of Energy until his government's defeat. He did not stand as a party list candidate in the 2008 general election.

In 1990, Duynhoven was awarded the New Zealand 1990 Commemoration Medal. He was appointed a Companion of the Queen's Service Order in the 2012 New Year Honours, for services as a Member of Parliament.

== Local government politics ==
In October 2010, Duynhoven was elected Mayor of New Plymouth. Three years later, on 12 October 2013, Mr Duynhoven became the first New Plymouth mayor since Edward Hill in 1956 to be ousted after one term." He attributed his defeat at that election to being overshadowed by maverick councillor John McLeod.

McLeod, along with fellow councillor Len Houwers, resigned in late 2014. On 11 January 2015, Duynhoven confirmed months of speculation that he would stand in the by-election to fill the vacancies. Duynhoven said his decision to stand in the by-election came after receiving "a huge number of phone calls and visits from people asking me to stand." Duynhoven was one of the two successful candidates. He was re-elected in the 2016 local elections and the 2019 local elections. In both of those elections, he was also elected to the Taranaki District Health Board.

In July 2025, Duynhoven announced that he would be retiring from the New Plymouth District Council at that year's local elections.

New Zealand Parliament
Preceded by Tony Friedlander	Member of Parliament for New Plymouth; 1987–1990; 1993–2008	Succeeded by John Armstrong
Preceded by John Armstrong	Member of Parliament for New Plymouth; 1987–1990; 1993–2008	Succeeded by Jonathan Young
Preceded by John McLeod and Len Howners	Councillor of the New Plymouth District; 2015 by-election	Succeeded by Incumbent
