= Robert Parker (musician) =

New Zealand organist, choirmaster and conductor (1847–1937)

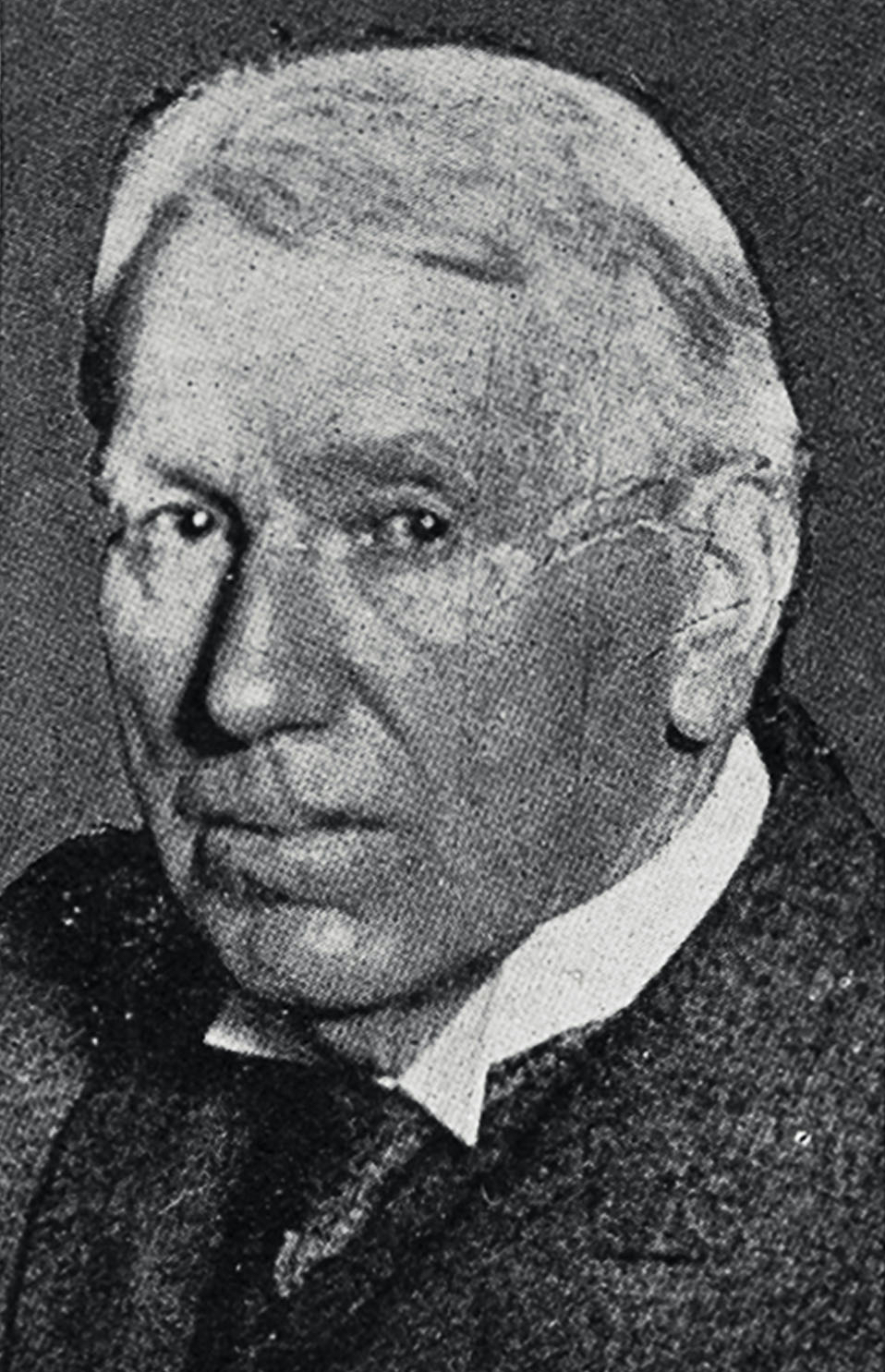
Robert Parker

Robert Parker CMG (9 January 1847 – 20 February 1937) was a New Zealand organist, choirmaster and conductor.

== Early life ==
Parker was born in London, England, in 1847. He received his music education, studying violin, piano and organ, from the organist George Cooper, as a chorister at St Paul's Cathedral and at the London Academy of Music and Queens' College, Cambridge.

== Career ==
Parker emigrated to Christchurch in 1869 becoming organist and choirmaster at the Church of St John the Baptist . In 1878 he moved first to Nelson and then to Wellington where he became organist and choirmaster at St Paul's Cathedral.

In Wellington he became active in a range of musical activities. He was conductor of the Wellington Orchestral Society, the Wellington Choral Society, Wellington Musical Union, and the Wellington Liedertafel. He lectured at the Wellington Teachers College, examined music for the Department of Education and University of New Zealand and chaired the Music Teachers' Association of New Zealand and the Music Teachers' Registration Board.

In 1888 he began New Zealand Music Festivals encouraging composers such as Alfred Hill and Maughan Barnett.

The writer Katherine Mansfield based the character of the piano teacher Mr Bullen in her short story The Wind Blows on Parker.

Parker laid the foundations of choral and orchestra music in New Zealand in the 19th century.

== Honours and awards ==
He was appointed a Companion of the Order of St Michael and St George in the 1930 New Year Honours as "a leading member of the musical profession in the Dominion of New Zealand".

== Personal life ==
Parker married Emma Martin in 1871 and they had four sons and three daughters.

He died in Wellington on 20 February 1937.
