= Ruby Cameron =

Robina Thomson Cameron MBE (15 April 1892 – 28 June 1971), known as Ruby Cameron, was a New Zealand district nurse, community leader and nursing inspector. She was born in Edinburgh, Midlothian, Scotland, on 15 April 1892, coming to New Zealand in 1911 where she trained at Cook Hospital, Gisborne.

== Career ==
During World War 1 Cameron worked in England and Egypt, returning to New Zealand in 1919 where she became a district (public health) nurse on the East Coast of the North Island. In 1931, she was appointed as district nurse at Rotorua, by the Department of Public Health. In Rotorua she was appalled at the state of Māori health, housing, unemployment, poor sanitation, diet, incidence of infectious diseases and infant mortality. She met with chiefs and women on the marae, set up health clinics, and did much educational work. While in Rotorua, Cameron was involved in the establishment of the Women's Health League, and remained its president from its formation in 1937, until her death in 1971. The Women's Health League had strong ties to Te Arawa (a confederation of Māori tribes), and it supported typhoid inoculations and other health initiatives. The League built a guest house to accommodate Māori visiting Rotorua to see relatives in hospital as they were often refused accommodation in hotels and boarding houses. The Janet Fraser Memorial Guest House, named after the League's patroness Janet Fraser, was opened by Peter Fraser in 1948.

She lobbied the Department of Native Affairs, local MPs and the Arawa Trust Board on the housing situation which resulted in the Department building houses in the Rotorua district. Cameron was instrumental in getting free milk provided to school children in Native Schools and the scheme was later extended to all state schools.

For her involvement in the Women's Health League, Cameron was appointed a Member of the Order of the British Empire (MBE) in the 1938 King's Birthday Honours. Her work led to an improvement in the health of Māori people especially children and babies. In 1986 the Tunohopu Health Centre in Rotorua was opened and dedicated to Nurse Cameron.
