= 1930 New Year Honours (New Zealand) =

Annual awards for New Zealanders

The 1930 New Year Honours in New Zealand were appointments by King George V on the advice of the New Zealand government to various orders and honours to reward and highlight good works by New Zealanders. The awards celebrated the passing of 1929 and the beginning of 1930, and were announced on 1 January 1930.

The recipients of honours are displayed here as they were styled before their new honour.

== Knight Bachelor ==
- The Honourable Thomas Kay Sidey MLC – Attorney General.
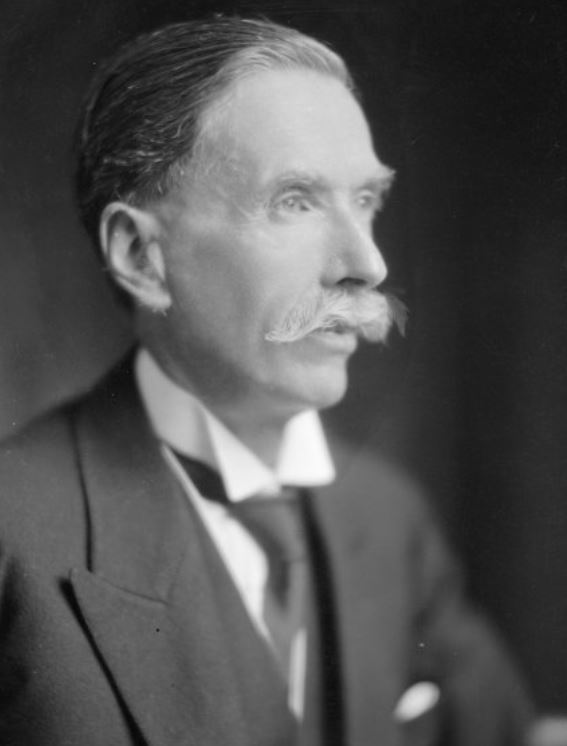
Sir Thomas Sidey

== Order of Saint Michael and Saint George ==
=== Knight Grand Cross (GCMG) ===
- The Right Honourable Sir Joseph George Ward Bt KCMG MP – Prime Minister.
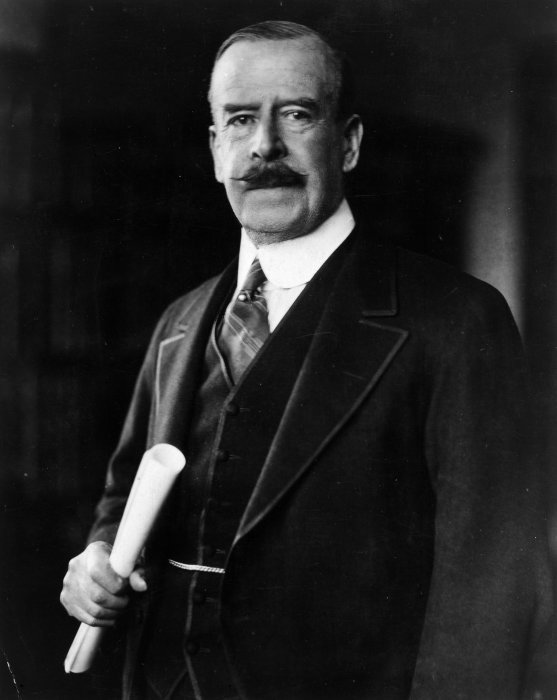
Sir Joseph Ward

=== Knight Commander (KCMG) ===
- The Honourable Michael Myers KC – Chief Justice.
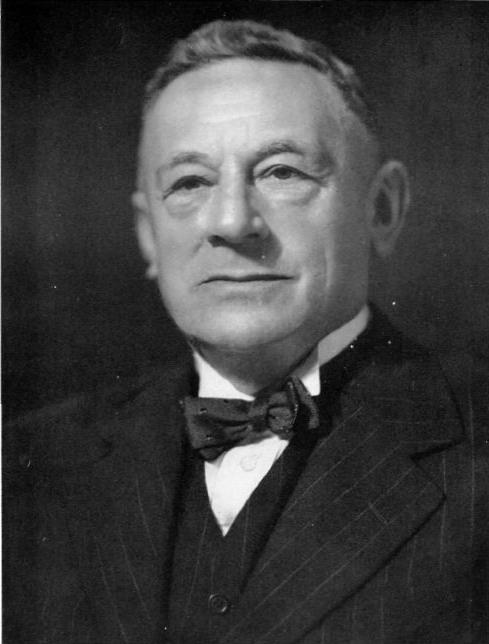
Sir Michael Myers

=== Companion (CMG) ===
- Edward William Kane – clerk of the House of Representatives.
- Robert Parker – of Wellington; a leading member of the musical profession.
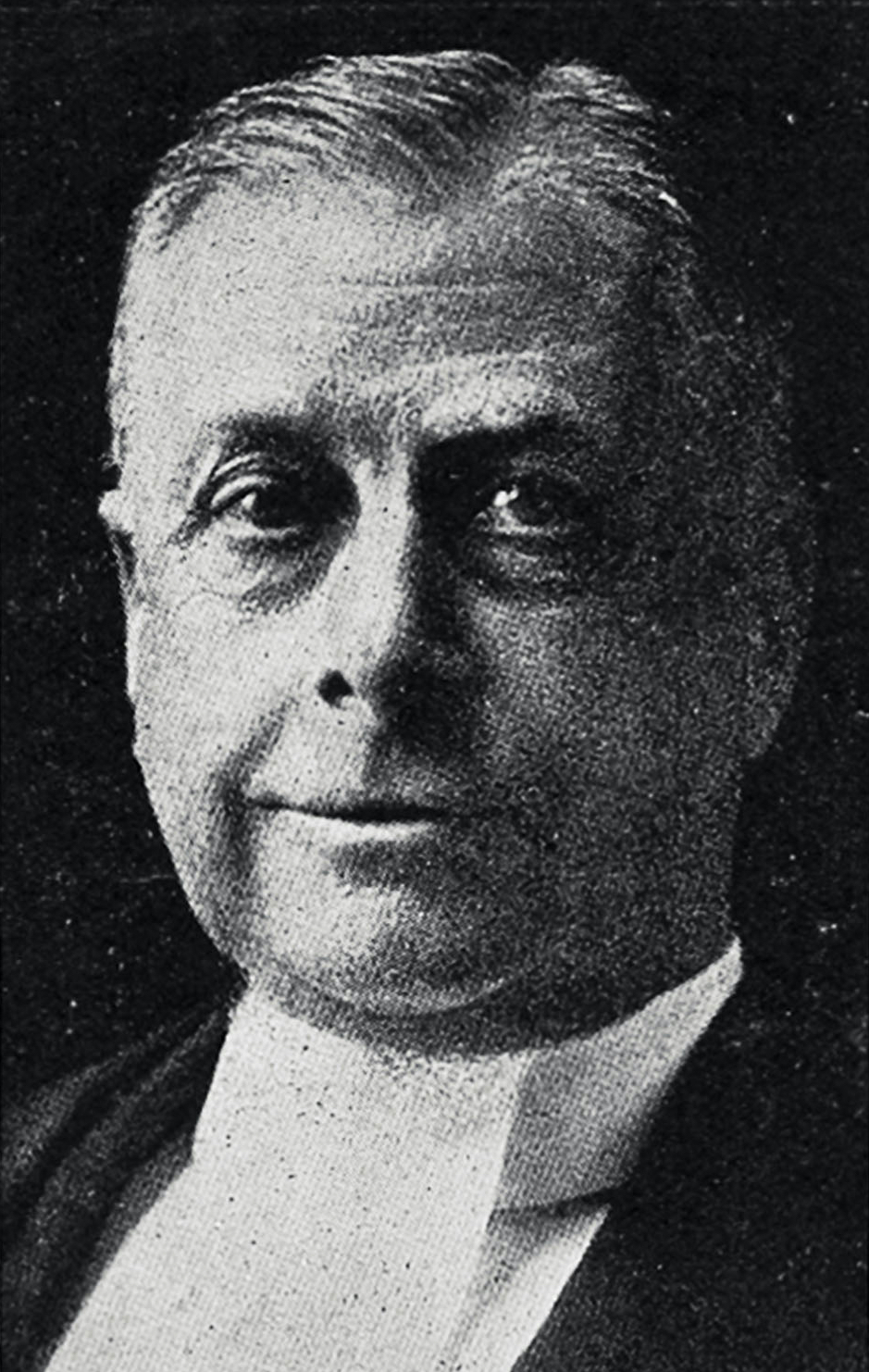
Edward William Kane

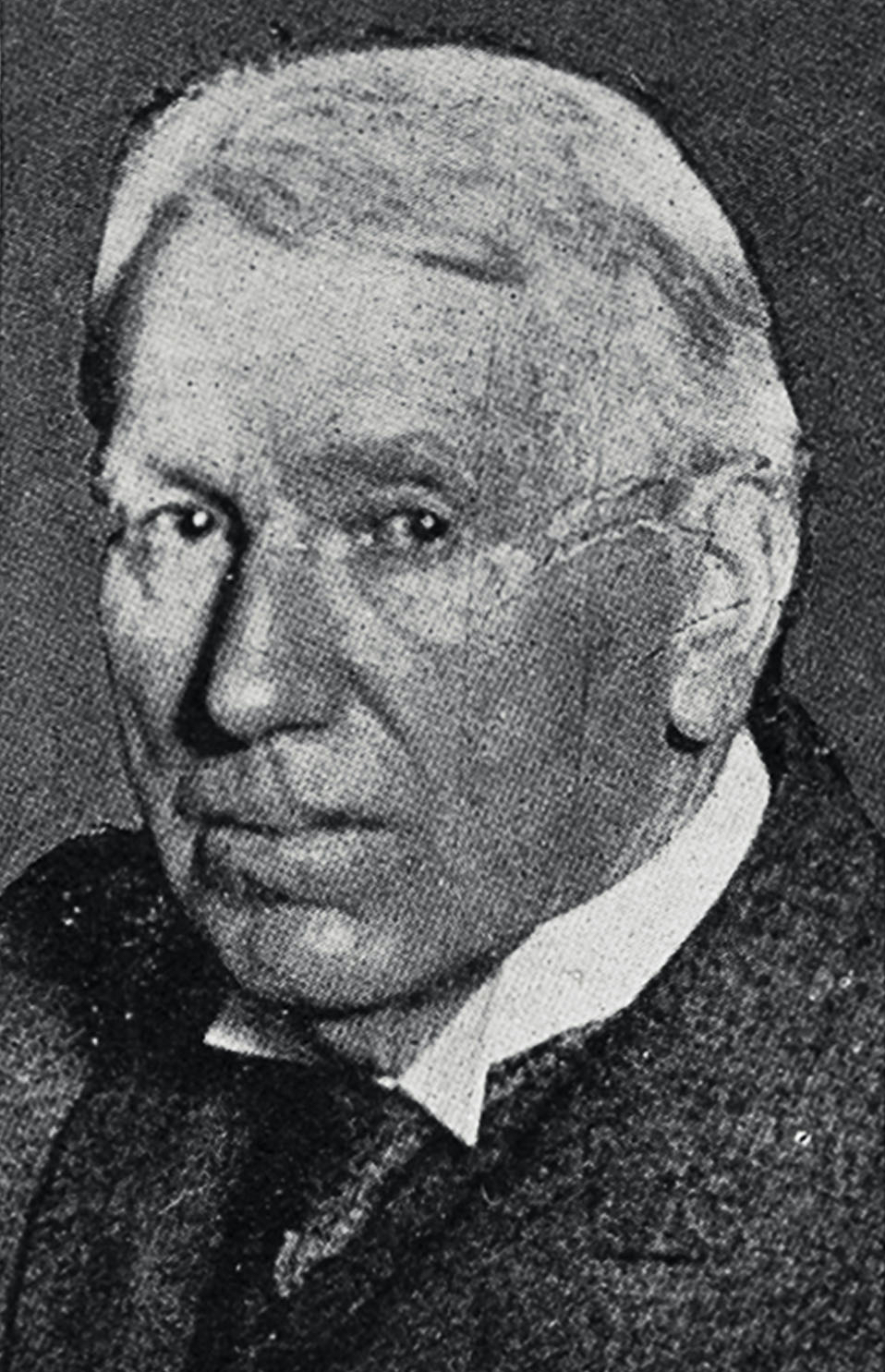
Robert Parker

== Order of the British Empire ==
=== Commander (CBE) ===
Civil division

- Arthur Albert Luckham – resident commissioner, Niue Island.
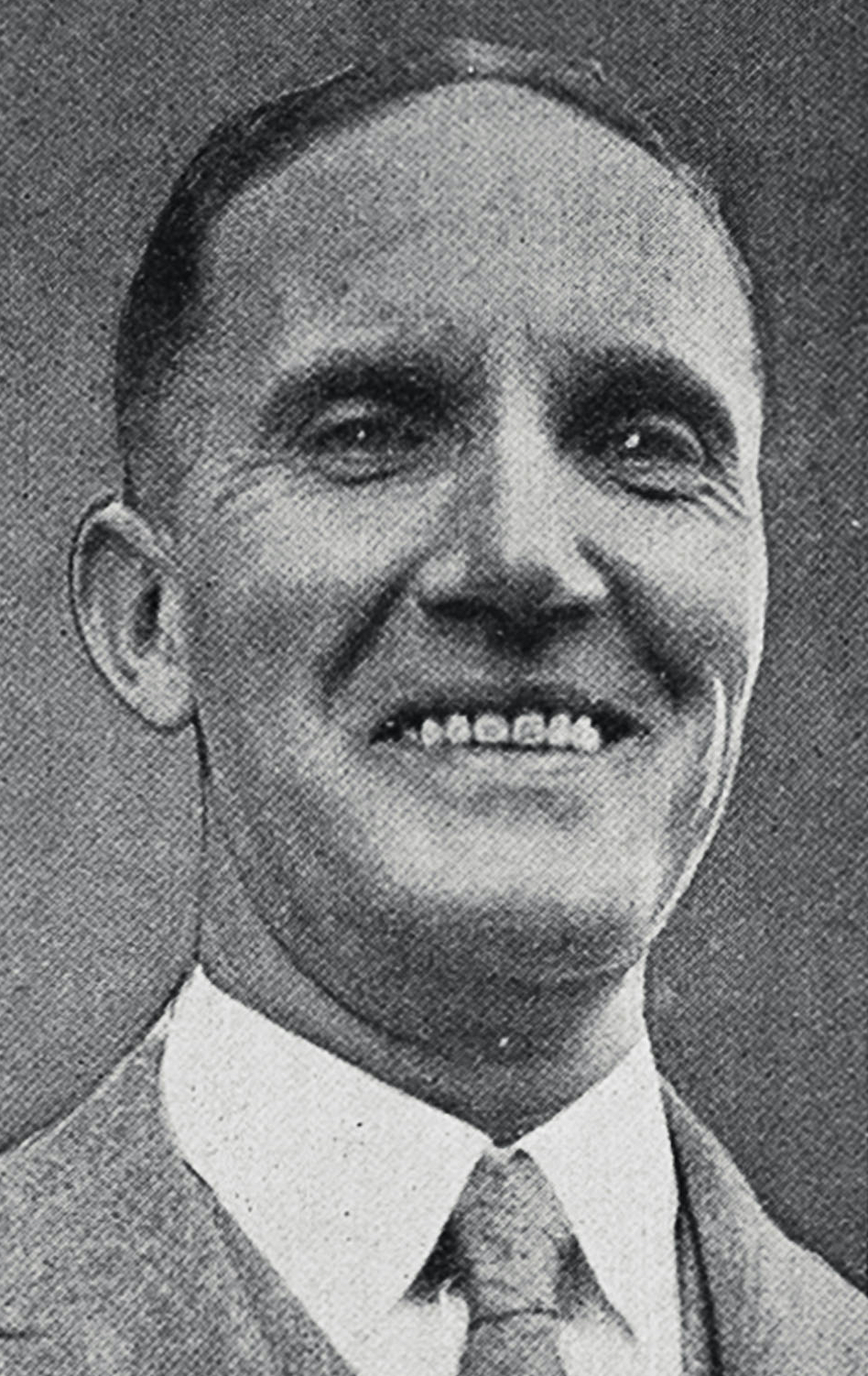
Albert Luckham
