= Sadie Macdonald =

New Zealand nurse

Sadie Macdonald OBE (née Murn; 3 July 1886 – 12 May 1966) was a New Zealand nurse and community leader. She was born in Gulgong, New South Wales, Australia, on 3 July 1886.

In the 1938 King's Birthday Honours, Macdonald was appointed an Officer of the Order of the British Empire, for social welfare services.
