= Phoebe Myers =

Teacher, educational reformer (1866–1947)

- Born: 13 June 1866; Nelson, New Zealand
- Died: 2 June 1947 (aged 80); Wellington, New Zealand
- Occupation: Teacher
- Known for: Education reformer
- Relatives: Michael Myers (brother)

Phoebe Myers (13 June 1866 – 2 June 1947) was a New Zealand teacher and educational reformer. She was one of the first women to teach science at college level in New Zealand, and the first woman to represent her country at the League of Nations.

== Early life and education ==
Myers was born in Nelson, New Zealand on 13 June 1866 to Jewish parents Eve Solomon and Judah Myers, a merchant. She was educated at Motueka and then Thorndon Schools, after the family moved to Wellington in 1879, and then Wellington Girls' College. She enrolled at Canterbury College in 1885, and graduated in 1890 with a Bachelor of Arts.

== Career ==
External image
- Portrait of Phoebe Myers - National Library of New Zealand

Myers taught in schools around Wellington, New Zealand, for the next forty years. She enrolled at Victoria College in 1899, where she also taught as a biology demonstrator (1906–1912). She was one of the first women to teach college level science in New Zealand.

Myers never married, and was committed to furthering women's interests and education. She was part of a group of women who in 1901 formed the Wellington Women Teachers' Association, in response to growing concerns among women teachers that they had no representation on decision-making bodies. In 1914 the federated New Zealand Women Teachers' Association was formed, and Myers played a leading role, as president from 1914 to 1916 and Vice-president 1916–1919.

Myers served on the General Council of Education from 1915 to 1920. She was a member of the Wellington Philosophical Society and the Wellington Free Kindergarten Association (1916–1921). Myers also had articles about education published in the New Zealand newspapers.

Myers retired from teaching in 1921.

== International activities ==
In the 1920s Myers was in England, where she gave lectures to Women's Institutes about life for women in New Zealand. She worked for the Victoria League, whose remit was to increase understanding and cooperation with the countries of the then British Empire. Myers was the first woman to represent her country at the League of Nations in Geneva, where she discussed women's and children's welfare in 1929.

Myers' brother Sir Michael Myers was Chief Justice of New Zealand.

== Legacy ==
Myers died in Wellington on 2 June 1947. In 2017, Myers was selected as one of the Royal Society Te Aparangi's 150 women in 150 words.
