= Ron Barclay =

New Zealand politician

Ron Barclay QSO MBE JP
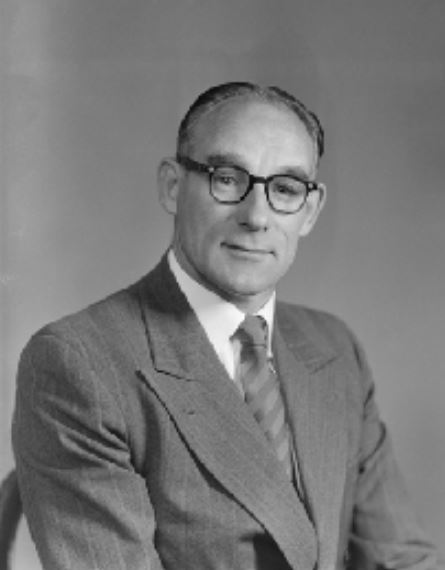

Member of the New Zealand Parliament for New Plymouth
- In office 26 November 1966 – 29 November 1975
- Preceded by: Ernest Aderman
- Succeeded by: Tony Friedlander

Personal details
- Born: Ronald Morrison Barclay; 2 September 1914 Little River, New Zealand
- Died: 29 April 2003 (aged 88) New Plymouth, New Zealand
- Party: Labour
- Spouse: Joy Margaret Lusty (m. 1940)
- Relations: Jim Barclay (uncle); Bruce Barclay (cousin)
- Children: 2

Ronald Morrison Barclay QSO MBE JP (2 September 1914 – 29 April 2003) was a New Zealand politician of the Labour Party.

== Early life and family ==
Born in Little River, New Zealand in 1914, he received his education at the Christchurch Technical College. When he was 12 his father died and the burden of financial provision for his family fell to him at an early age which curtailed his aspiration of training to be a teacher which in later life he admitted still causing him to feel embittered.

He came from a deeply political family with his father, Morrison Barclay, being a Liberal Party member and his uncle John was a Reform Party member. Barclay's other uncle Jim Barclay represented the Marsden electorate for the Labour Party from 1935 until his defeat in 1943. His cousin Bruce Barclay represented Christchurch Central for the Labour Party from 1969 until his death in 1979. He himself joined the Labour Party and in 1933 he was a campaign committee member for Dan Sullivan's mayoral campaign in Christchurch. Likewise in 1935 he was a campaign committee member for Tim Armstrong in Christchurch East.

Barclay married Joy Margaret Lusty in 1940 and they had one son and one daughter. Barclay was on home service during World War II. Following the war he became a farmer, purchasing land in Kaiwaka. In 1955 he and his family moved to New Plymouth and took over ownership of a shoe store at the suggestion of mayor Everard Gilmour.

He was a member of the Auckland Education Board (1949–1954) and the New Plymouth High School board (1958–1960). He was a member of the Taranaki Hospital board from 1960 to 1966. He was a trustee of the TSB Bank from 1958, and was the bank's president in 1963 and 1974.

== Political career ==
New Zealand Parliament
Years	Term	Electorate	Party
1966–1969	35th	New Plymouth	Labour
1969–1972	36th	New Plymouth	Labour
1972–1975	37th	New Plymouth	Labour

Upon his discharge from the army he became active in his local branch of the Labour Party and was on the party campaign committee in the Rodney electorate in both the 1946 and 1949 elections. He was invited to be Labour's candidate in Rodney at the 1951 election but declined, citing family responsibilities. He was likewise offered the candidacy in 1954 but again refused as he was preparing to leave the electorate and was already in the process of selling his farm.

Barclay eventually agreed to stand for the House of Representatives in 1957 for the Taranaki electorate of New Plymouth, but was narrowly defeated. He stood twice more unsuccessfully in 1960 and 1963 before finally winning the seat on the fourth attempt in 1966.

He served as Senior Government Whip in Norman Kirk's 1972–1975 Government, and colleague Warren Freer said Barclay was an outstanding whip. When Barclay realised that Arthur Faulkner had the votes to win the first ballot for deputy to Bill Rowling in 1974, he got Freer (who was not interested in the position, but who agreed that Faulkner was not leadership material) nominated to split the first ballot vote. They both preferred either Colin Moyle (Barclay) or Bob Tizard (Freer), and Tizard won on the fourth ballot. He was the first Deputy Chairman of Committees (1975). He was unexpectedly defeated in the swing against Labour in the 1975 election.

He declined the offer to stand for New Plymouth in 1978 election and subsequently he entered local politics serving as a New Plymouth city councillor from 1977 to 1989, including three years as deputy mayor.

== Honours and awards ==
Barclay was appointed a Member of the Order of the British Empire, for services to the community, in the 1978 New Year Honours. In the 1986 New Year Honours, he was made a Companion of the Queen's Service Order for public services. In 1990, Barclay was awarded the New Zealand 1990 Commemoration Medal.

== Death and legacy ==
Barclay died in New Plymouth on 29 April 2003 and his ashes were buried in Awanui Cemetery. He was survived by his wife Joy. Ron Barclay Drive in the New Plymouth coastal suburb of Fitzroy was named in his honour in 2004.

== Notes ==
New Zealand Parliament
Preceded by Ernest Aderman	Member of Parliament for New Plymouth; 1966–1975	Succeeded by Tony Friedlander
Party political offices
Preceded by Henry May	Senior Whip of the Labour Party; 1972–1975	Succeeded by Roger Drayton
Political offices
New creation	Deputy Chairman of Committees; 1975	Succeeded by Bill Birch
