= Ernest Aderman =

New Zealand politician

Ernest Aderman OBE
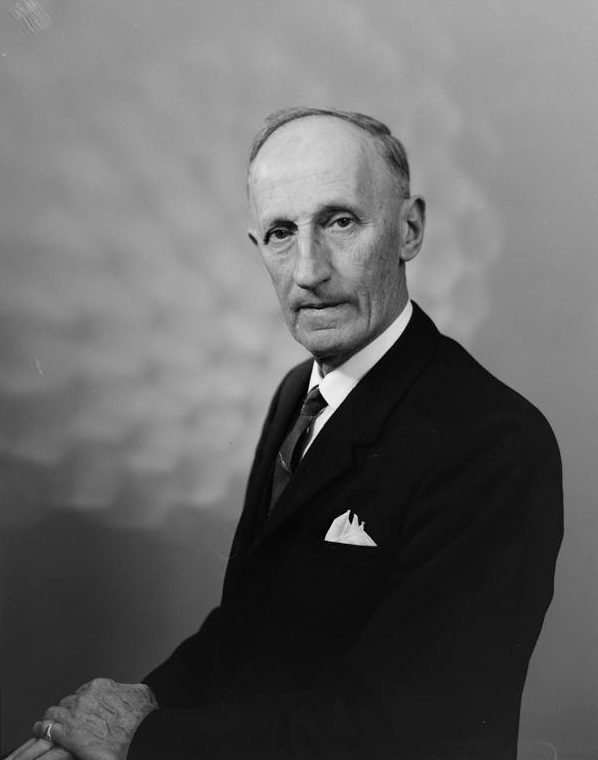

Member of the New Zealand Parliament for New Plymouth
- In office 25 September 1943 – 26 November 1966
- Preceded by: Fred Frost
- Succeeded by: Ron Barclay

Personal details
- Born: Ernest Philip Adermann; 22 May 1894 Queensland, Australia
- Died: 27 February 1968 (aged 73)
- Party: National
- Spouse: Phyllis May Lowther (m. 1927)
- Relations: Charles Adermann (brother); Evan Adermann (nephew)

Rev. Ernest Philip Aderman OBE (né Adermann; 22 May 1894 – 27 February 1968) was a New Zealand politician of the National Party.

== Biography ==
=== Early life and family ===
Aderman was born in Queensland, Australia, in 1894. He was one of eight children born to German immigrant parents Emilie (née Litzow) and Carl Friederich Adermann. His younger brother Charles Adermann entered politics in Australia. He received his education at Lapwood Primary (Queensland), and at Church of Christ Theological College (Melbourne), from where he obtained a diploma in theology. He attended the University of Queensland (Brisbane) between 1920 and 1925, and graduated with a BA. During his student years, he helped out on his parents' farm, and later served the church in Auburn, Sydney.

He married Phyllis May Lowther at the Ann Street Church of Christ, Brisbane, on 8 March 1927. The couple arrived in Wellington, New Zealand, on 13 March 1928 by the Marama.

=== Life in New Zealand ===
Aderman lectured at the Church of Christ Theological College in Glenleith, Dunedin, and ministered in South Dunedin. From 1930, he served the church at Dominion Road, Auckland. He was President of the Churches of Christ in 1936. During World War II, he was a chaplain to the 2nd Taranaki Regiment.

=== Political career ===
New Zealand Parliament
Years	Term	Electorate	Party
1943–1946	27th	New Plymouth	National
1946–1949	28th	New Plymouth	National
1949–1951	29th	New Plymouth	National
1951–1954	30th	New Plymouth	National
1954–1957	31st	New Plymouth	National
1957–1960	32nd	New Plymouth	National
1960–1963	33rd	New Plymouth	National
1963–1966	34th	New Plymouth	National

Aderman contested the 1938 election in the Dunedin South electorate and was unsuccessful against the incumbent, Fred Jones. He was to stand in Dunedin Central in the cancelled 1941 general election.

He won the New Plymouth seat in an upset victory in 1943 over Rev. Fred Frost, who was also a Christian minister. He represented the New Plymouth electorate from 1943 until he retired in 1966. Despite his initial win in 1943 being considered a shock result he went on to become New Plymouth's longest ever serving MP.

In 1953, Aderman was awarded the Queen Elizabeth II Coronation Medal.

In 1957, he was Senior Whip, and from 1958 to 1960, he was Junior Whip under Geoff Gerard. In 1961 he was one of ten National MPs to vote with the Opposition and remove capital punishment for murder from the Crimes Bill that the Second National Government had introduced.

=== Later life and death ===
Aderman was appointed an Officer of the Order of the British Empire, for public and political services, in the 1967 New Year Honours.

Aderman died on 27 February 1968, and his ashes were buried at Te Henui Cemetery, New Plymouth.

== Notes ==
New Zealand Parliament
Preceded by Fred Frost	Member of Parliament for New Plymouth; 1943–1966	Succeeded by Ron Barclay
