= Fred Frost =

New Zealand politician and clergyman

The Reverend Fred Frost
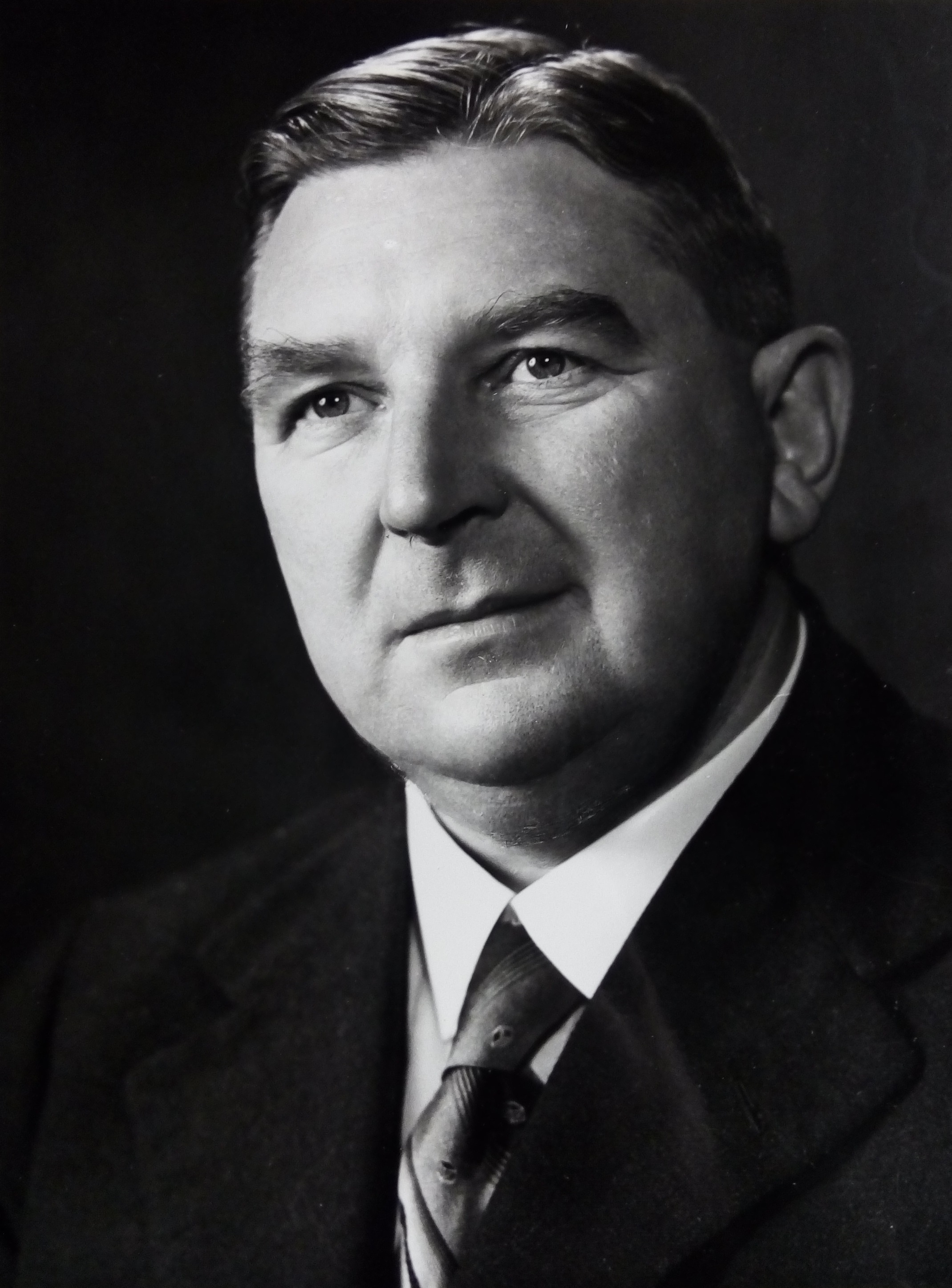

Member of the New Zealand Parliament for New Plymouth
- In office 15 October 1938 – 25 September 1943
- Preceded by: Sydney George Smith
- Succeeded by: Ernest Aderman

Personal details
- Born: 1887 Northumberland, England
- Died: 19 July 1957 (aged 69–70) Auckland, New Zealand
- Party: Labour
- Spouse: Margaret Clarice Seed
- Relations: Darien Fenton (granddaughter)
- Children: 5

Reverend Frederick Ledger Frost (1887 – 19 July 1957) was a New Zealand clergyman and politician of the Labour Party.

== Early life and career ==
Frost was born in Northumberland, England, in 1887 and from the ages of 13 to 24 was a coal-miner in England and then Australia. He came to New Zealand in 1911, and worked in the Millerton mines before becoming a Methodist minister. He enlisted in the army during World War I he was a soldier in the 1st Otago Tunneling Corps, then became a Chaplain-Captain before being wounded in action in 1918.

He was for 14 years a Methodist minister and City Missioner in Auckland initially, but then stationed at Stratford, Dunedin, Edendale, Lyttelton and Tauranga. He changed to the Anglican Church in 1924, becoming a vicar in Taradale in 1926 until 1935.

He was President of the Taradale Returned and Services' Association from 1927 to 1934 and member of both the Hawke's Bay Education Board and Napier Boys' High School Board from 1931 to 1935. He then worked in broadcasting at the head office of the Labour Department from 1936 to 1938.

== Member of Parliament ==
New Zealand Parliament
Years	Term	Electorate	Party
1938–1943	26th	New Plymouth	Labour

Frost stood for New Plymouth unsuccessfully in 1931 and 1935 as the Labour Party candidate.

He represented the New Plymouth electorate from the 1938 general election to 1943, when he was defeated by the National candidate, Rev Ernest Aderman, who was also a Christian minister. He was the first Labour MP to represent New Plymouth in Parliament.

== Later life and death ==
After he was defeated he moved to Auckland in 1943.

He died in Auckland on 19 July 1957, survived by his wife, son and four daughters.

His granddaughter, Darien Fenton, was elected to Parliament as a Labour MP in 2005.

== Notes ==
New Zealand Parliament
Preceded by Sydney George Smith	Member of Parliament for New Plymouth; 1938–1943	Succeeded by Ernest Aderman
