= Pan Pacific and Southeast Asia Women's Association =

Pan Pacific and Southeast Asia Women's Association (PPSEAWA), earlier Pan-Pacific Women's Association (PPWA), is an international women's organization, founded in Honolulu, Hawaii in 1930. The Pan-Pacific Women's Association (PPWA) changed its name to Pan Pacific and Southeast Asia Women's Association in 1955.

== Conferences ==
=== Pan-Pacific Union ===
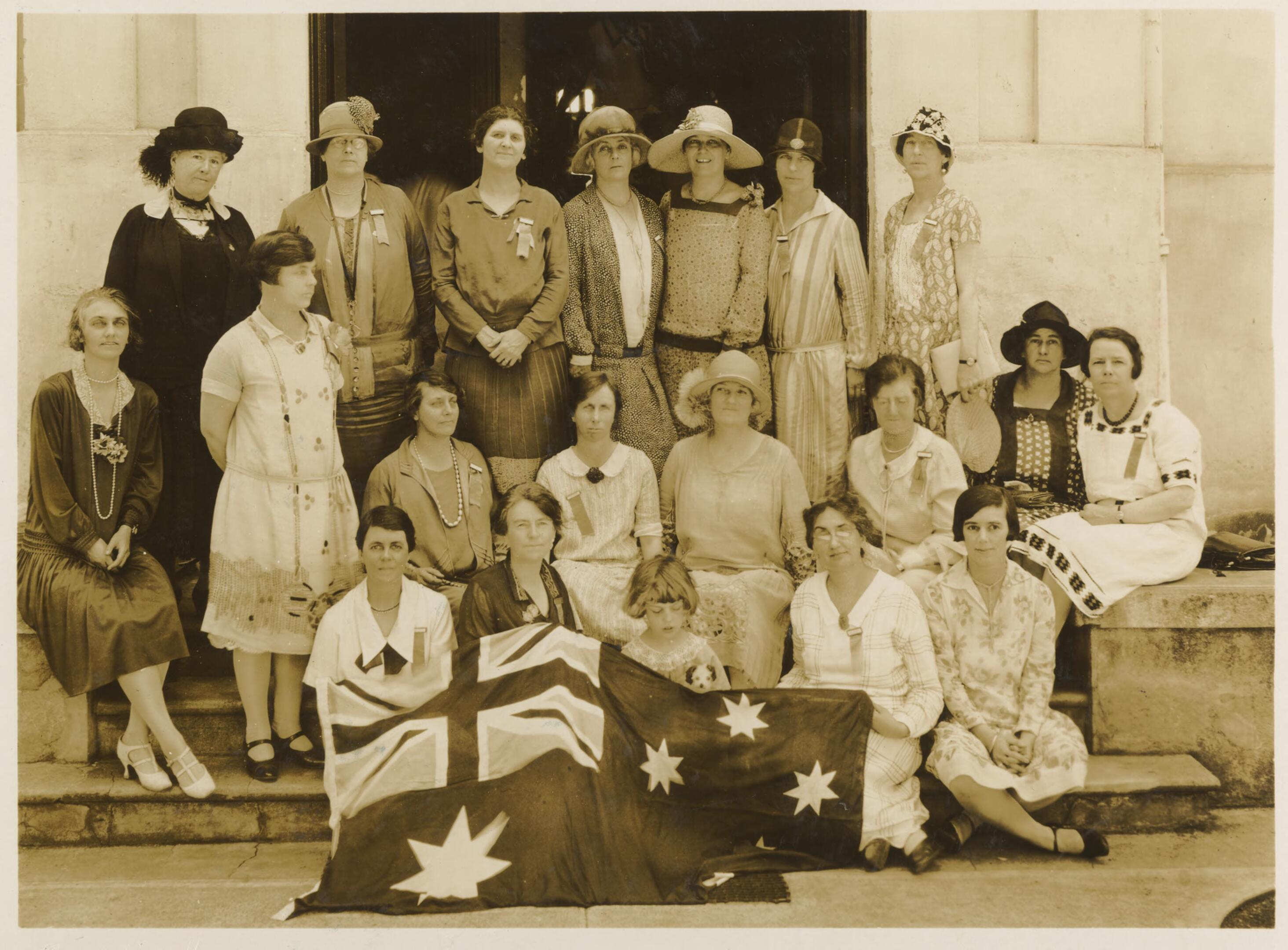
Australian delegates to the inaugural Pan-Pacific Women's Conference in Hawaii in 1928

In 1928, the First Pan-Pacific Women's Conference was organised in Honolulu under the umbrella of Pan-Pacific Union with the support of the New Zealand Women Teachers' Association. It was the first international women's conference arranged outside of the Western world and in the Pacific region.

=== Pan-Pacific Women's Association ===
When the second Pan-Pacific Women's Conference was arranged on Honolulu on Hawaii in 1930, the Pan-Pacific Women's Association was founded. The Pan-Pacific Women's Association arranged the following Pan-Pacific Women's Conferences: Honolulu (1934 and 1949), Canada (1937), New Zealand (1952), The Philippines (1955) and Japan (1958).

=== Pan Pacific and Southeast Asia Women's Association ===
The Pan Pacific and Southeast Asia Women's Association's recent conference locations include Kuala Lumpur, Malaysia (2016), Taiwan (2019), and Wellington, New Zealand (2024).
