= Tony Friedlander =

New Zealand politician

Anthony Peter David Friedlander QSO (born 12 November 1944) is a former New Zealand politician of the National Party. After politics, he worked as a lobbyist for the Road Transport Forum (RTF).

== Early life ==
Friedlander was born in 1944 at Wanganui. His father was Morris Friedlander, who was an important organisational figure for the National Party. Tony Friedlander received his education at Lincoln College, from where he graduated with Dip Ag (diploma in agriculture), with a Dip VFM (diploma in valuation and farm management). He is an Associate of the New Zealand Institute of Valuers. He was a farm appraiser for the State Advances Corporation in 1968 and 1969, a farm economist for the Poultrymen's Co-op in 1970, and then a farm appraiser for the Rural Banking & Finance Corporation from 1971 to 1975.

== Political career ==
New Zealand Parliament
Years	Term	Electorate	Party
1975–1978	38th	New Plymouth	National
1978–1981	39th	New Plymouth	National
1981–1984	40th	New Plymouth	National
1984–1987	41st	New Plymouth	National

He stood in the New Plymouth electorate in the 1975 election and in the swing against the Labour Party that year, he defeated the incumbent, Ron Barclay. He represented the electorate until 1987, when he was defeated by Labour's Harry Duynhoven. From December 1981 to June 1982, he was parliamentary under-secretary to the Minister of Energy, the Minister of National Development, and the Minister of Regional Development (Bill Birch in all cases). From June 1982 to July 1984, he was Minister of Works and Development, and Minister of Housing.

== Post politics ==
Friedlander held various management positions with Fletcher Challenge between 1987 and 1993. He was appointed chief executive officer at the NZ Road Transport Association in 1993 and held that position for four years, to then become the inaugural chief executive officer of the newly established Road Transport Forum (RTF), which represents trucking companies and lobbies for road transport in New Zealand. Friedlander retired from that role in 2010 and was succeeded by Ken Shirley.

In the 1994 New Year Honours, Friedlander was appointed a Companion of the Queen's Service Order for public services.

== Notes ==
New Zealand Parliament
Preceded by Ron Barclay	Member of Parliament for New Plymouth; 1975–1987	Succeeded by Harry Duynhoven
