= Jonathan Young (politician) =

New Zealand politician

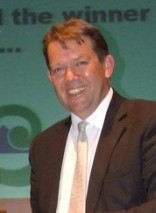

Member of the New Zealand Parliament for New Plymouth
- In office 8 November 2008 – 17 October 2020
- Preceded by: Harry Duynhoven
- Succeeded by: Glen Bennett

Personal details
- Born: 1958 (age 67–68)
- Party: National Party
- Relations: Venn Young (father)
- Occupation: Formerly Christian minister, teacher

Jonathan Edgar Joseph Young (born 1958) is a former National Party Member of the New Zealand House of Representatives for the New Plymouth electorate. He was first elected in the 2008 general election and served until 2020.

== Early years ==
Jonathan Young is the son of Venn Young, a National MP from 1966 to 1990. He attended New Plymouth Boys High School but later finished his education at Hawera High School. Before entering politics, Young was the Senior Minister at CityChurch Waitakere in West Auckland for 18 years. He has also been a primary school teacher, and a financial administrator. In addition, he has been involved in development work in Cambodia.

== Member of Parliament ==
New Zealand Parliament
Years	Term	Electorate	List	Party
2008–2011	49th	New Plymouth	66	National
2011–2014	50th	New Plymouth	45	National
2014–2017	51st	New Plymouth	38	National
2017–2020	52nd	New Plymouth	35	National

In the 2008 election, Young was narrowly victorious in the New Plymouth seat against long-standing Labour incumbent Harry Duynhoven. Young's final majority was 105 votes – a margin of 0.3% of the total vote count in that electorate. New Plymouth had been one of the seats that the party had focused on as they had won the party vote in the 2005 election and campaign head Steven Joyce felt that "it had swung further our way".

During a debate on the controversially rushed-through Copyright (New Technologies) Amendment Act 2008 in April 2011, which was aimed at controlling internet piracy, he described the internet as being akin to Skynet from The Terminator movies.

Young voted against the Marriage (Definition of Marriage) Amendment Bill in 2013 which would legalise same-sex marriage, saying "marriage had always been a heterosexual institution".

In August 2019, Young also voted against the Abortion Legislation Bill in its first reading, which would liberalise abortion law in New Zealand.

At the 2020 election, Young was defeated in New Plymouth by Labour candidate Glen Bennett by a final margin of 2,555 votes. Ranked 22nd on the National list, he was placed too low to return to Parliament via the list. After National list MP Nick Smith resigned and Harete Hipango entered parliament of National's list, Young became the next person in line to enter Parliament off of National's list if any other National list MPs leave Parliament over the course of the current term.

== Homophobia controversy ==
Shortly after the 2008 New Zealand general election, Young was criticised by the GayNZ.com website for his statement that 'one of my associates was an ex-lesbian' and for his involvement with Teen Challenge, a Christian youth organisation with links to the ex-gay movement. When commenting further, Young noted, "One of the things I do strongly object to in terms of the people [homosexuals] who have made this choice is the presentation of it as a normal alternative."

New Zealand Parliament
Preceded by Harry Duynhoven	Member of Parliament for New Plymouth; 2008–2020	Succeeded by Glen Bennett
