= New Zealand Women Teachers' Association =

The New Zealand Women Teachers' Association (NZWTA) was an advocacy group for the rights of teachers that engaged with the Government on a range of issues related to the status, pay scales, working conditions and opportunities for women teachers in the country from 1914 to 1964. Beginning as a number of regional organisations that had begun lobbying the New Zealand Government on education issues from 1901, by 1915 NZWTA was a national organisation with a constitution and elected committee that ran annual conferences and presented remits to the Government on behalf of the regions. The association was affiliated with the National Council of Women (NCW), worked with the New Zealand Educational Institute (NZEI) and was a member of the Pan Pacific and Southeast Asia Women's Association which led later to the establishment of the Pan-Pacific Women's Association in 1930.

== Background and beginnings ==
After the passing of the New Zealand Education Act in 1877, teachers in primary schools in the country were paid according to a grading based on the size of the schools in which they taught and because they were paid less than men, many women were employed by these schools. This pay disparity was evident across all occupations, but with the majority of teachers early in the 20th century in New Zealand being women, there were already moves in the country to address some of these inequities in education, including a petition to the Minister of Education in 1890 from a group of women teachers in Southland, asking for women to get equal pay with male teachers and have the same eligibility to progress in "all positions of the Education service."

From 1900 the school system in New Zealand became increasingly centralised with legislation being passed giving the Department of Education more control over pay and appointment of teachers. In 1901 a group of women teachers met in North Canterbury in response to a report of the Royal Education Commission (known as the Hogg Commission) which proposed a "uniform scale of staff and salaries" for teachers in New Zealand public schools. In the discussion about whether men and women should be paid equally for equal work the Report acknowledged "that women in many instances do not receive payments commensurate with the work they perform", and while it is recorded that there was some division amongst members of the commission on the issue of equal pay for men and women, it is concluded that there was [unity] "in thinking that under present circumstances the principle cannot be applied." The gender differentiation is confirmed in both of the suggested pay scales. A full appendix of the discussions, written as Minutes of Evidence, shows a range of views on the issue of equal pay for men and women. These included assumptions women were physically inferior to men, that they would leave teaching to get married and a perception there was already a surplus of women teachers, with some male witnesses expressing a "very low opinion of the value of women teachers 'work'".

The Public-School Teachers' Salaries Act (1901) was passed "to remove the existing Anomalies and Inequities in the Staffing of Public Schools and in the Salaries paid to Public School Teachers", and "the Education Act Amendment Act 1905 and Education Amendment Act 1908 were later noted as [defining] "the procedures for making teacher appointments." The Cohen Commission (2012) was to "look into issues such as the powers and rights held by education authorities" and found some weaknesses in the education system including "unsatisfactory methods used by most education boards to appoint and promote teachers." The Education Act (1914) was noted by New Zealand historian Alexander McLintock as making "no provision for [a] unified local control of primary and post-primary education", with a reduction in power or education boards and a strengthening of the central department. The Report of the Minister of Education in 1916 claimed there had been widespread approval of the new regulations of the grading of teachers in accordance with the provisions of the Act, and acknowledged that with further informed improvement "the graded list may be the basis of a much-improved system of appointment and promotion for the Dominion as a whole." The document noted the higher ratio of female teachers to male teachers in primary schools and contended that women teachers were the most suitable to work with this age group. Pay scales in the document showed an ongoing remunerational differential based on gender, significantly favouring male teachers.

Following the establishment of the North Canterbury Women Teachers' Association (NCWTA), attempts were made to establish other regional associations. The Wellington association formed in September 1901 but there was not widespread support in other areas of the country because of the variation of salaries and support by some teachers for the new proposed scale. Associations did form in Southland (1907), Auckland (1910), and Otago (1912), said to be as a result of having little confidence in their NZEI branches support getting recognition of their work.

== Establishment of a National Association ==
The regional associations became stronger and began lobbying MPs about pay inequities and lack of promotional opportunities for women teachers. Three teachers Phoebe Myers, Nellie Coad, and Emily Chaplin were elected to the government's Advisory Council of Education and in 1914 women teachers from around the country met and agreed to form the New Zealand Women Teachers' Association. Myers was elected president and explained to a meeting of the Wellington Branch that the National Association would have the power to register under the new Education Act (1915), which provided for women to be appointed to the Council of Education. She also noted that there would be a plan of action in place as guidance for the regional organisations and stressed the importance of working with training colleges and the directors of education [to] "evolve a system of education based on the laws of development" by looking at the "psychologic side." It was announced on 15 July 1915 that Myers and Chaplin had been elected to the Council of Education.

Other regional associations formed and became branches of NZWTA and by 1919 the membership was 734. Reflecting in 1922, the then secretary of the Association Emily Chaplin recalled correspondence between her and educational reformer Phoebe Myers that helped bring the regional groups together into a national organisation. Myers was committed to improving the status of women teachers and helped to set up the Wellington Women Teachers Association in 1901, later facilitating a meeting at Mount Cook Girls' School to establish the New Zealand Women Teachers' Association on 29 December 1914.

A committee was established in 1915 to consider a constitution for the national association, and while at that stage, registration was not possible, it was agreed to elect offices and a committee with Meyers appointed as president. Becoming registered under the Education Act remained a priority in 1916 and it was agreed that ex-women teachers and other interested in education could be considered for membership. The Annual General Meeting of the Association held in 1916, noted that branches had been formed in Napier, Gisborne, Palmerston North, New Plymouth, Nelson, Marlborough and Southland. The meeting also noted that there was no reply to the application for registration and clarified that the main "efforts of the association had been mainly concentrated...[on]...advocacy of promotion and payment of teachers on efficiency...[and]...men and women being graded on the same lines."

At the regional level, members would suggest remits on issues to be discussed at annual meetings of the national body. At the annual meeting of the Association in 1917, remits submitted by a range of regional associations included, the need for a satisfactory pupil / teacher ratio, women being appointed to the Inspectorate, organisation and management of infant departments, addressing the lack of a satisfactory of sick pay for teachers, better provisions for teaching students of special needs and women having higher status and positions in schools and in bodies dealing with education.

At a meeting of the Canterbury Women Teachers' Association on 7 March 1919, the newly elected president explained the aims of the Association as to "advance the cause of education generally and to study the needs of girls and infants particularly; to uphold the just claims of women teachers; and to cultivate a spirit of helpfulness and unity among them." The same meeting acknowledged the election of Emily Chaplin as the president of the New Zealand Women Teachers' Association. Chaplin stressed that now World War I was over, it was important to pay attention to educational issues, and reporting on the value of the work done by NZWHA to raise the status of women teachers. At the National Conference earlier in 2019 Chaplin put the position that during the war, "children had been taught lessons of sacrifice and unselfishness" and while teachers were more aware of their responsibility to meet "educational ideals", immediate attention to much-needed reforms in New Zealand schools would inform and involve the whole community and show how "school and home were recognised as interdependent." Specific concerns raised by Chaplin included children leaving school without sufficient knowledge of the basics, overcrowded classrooms, unattractive working conditions for teachers and poorly equipped buildings and playgrounds. According to Chaplin, the solution was the development of a curriculum that prepared children for life by training "both hand and brain...[concluding]...learning by doing must be more widely recognized as an essential and the curriculum of the future must be based on its truth."

== Affiliations ==
=== National Council of Women ===
NZWTA was affiliated with the National Council of Women (NCW) and in 1921 Blanche Carnachan, became the delegate for the Association to the council. NZWTA presented remits at the biennial conferences of NCW, and in 1944 successfully put the case to the National Council of Women for taking a more assertive approach to get public support to deal with "overcrowded schoolrooms and unduly large classes in primary schools", and the Council responded with a strongly-worded resolution to this effect.

=== New Zealand Educational Institute (NZEI) ===
From its inception the NZWTA encouraged its members to become involved in NZEI and vote for women representatives. There was some disagreement early in the relationship between the organisations when NZWTA did not agree with NZEI becoming the sole avenue of contact with the Minister of Education. Another issue arose in 1935 when, in spite of both organisations taking a stand against differentiated pay scales, some of the men in NZEI chose not to support this position because they felt their own salaries were at risk of being reduced. The NZEI did, however, work with NZWTA in fighting the unfair dismissal of three married women teachers which resulted in official restraints on education boards, and by "1947, with men teachers' salaries and conditions no longer threatened, the NZEI resolved to uphold the principle of equal pay, with the provision of an adequate allowance for ‘family responsibility’, paid to men only."

=== Pan-Pacific Women's Association ===
Women from NZWTA had a role in establishing the Pan Pacific Women's Association which arose from the Pan-Pacific and South-East Asia Women's Association (PPSEAWA), a forum for women to discuss issues in Pacific countries that had been supported by the Pan-Pacific Union. The first conference of PPSEAWA held in 1928, and attended by a delegation from New Zealand along with representatives from other countries in the region, agreed to set up a permanent women's organisation in the Pacific. The conference, working in four sections, government, industry, education and social service discussed a range of social issues related to the health and welfare of children and women's legal, political and employment rights. As a follow-up, in 1930, the Pan-Pacific Women's Association was set up, with delegates being encouraged to establish branches in their home countries. On 18 April 1931, a New Zealand national committee of the Pan-Pacific Women's Association was established in Wellington with Elsie Andrews from NZWTA elected as secretary. Andrews later attended the 1934 conference and in a press release noted that the Pan-Pacific Women's Association's aim was to build "peaceful understanding among Pan-Pacific countries by learning about the habits of their peoples and the education, health and other social work in each country."

== Selected issues ==
=== Status and rights of women ===
In 1917, Chaplin as president of NZWTA asked in the media why, in spite of women having proven during the war they were capable of managing positions previously held by men, there was still [in a country] "which has long boasted of an enfranchised womanhood...the anomaly of sex barrier."

Elsie Andrews was a strong advocate for the right of women to be educated and for their status as teachers to be recognised and valued. In 1929 in her opening of the annual conferences of the Association, she looked historically at attitudes toward women and while she acknowledged that by the end of the nineteenth century, women in England "thought for themselves, worked for themselves, and elected their own standards of modest and good conduct", at the time she was writing, in New Zealand there was the "survival of the ancient prejudice against the freedom of opportunity demanded by womenkind." She noted how this played out in education in the country with no women teachers as heads of a large school, appointed as an inspector or holding a responsible position within the Department of Education. In the address, Andrews concluded that women teachers "are not asking for preferential treatment...concessions or indulgences...they ask for justice." In 1936 Andrews discussed the place of women in civic life, noting that while "home building" was important, the "whole duty of women embraced duties, responsibilities and privileges in a wider sphere." In the same article, she suggested that even if women were treated fairly, the education system was biased in favour of boys and showed how girls' schools were under resourced compared to those for boys. Andrews maintained that political careers for women were "prevented by the tradition which kept these departments jealously guarded as a close preserve for man" and in general employment, women were paid less than men for the same work. Her concluding point was that it was important for any woman to have a respected place in civic life there should be no restrictions on her labour, so she could "attain that stage of development which would fit her to be the companion of man in the direction of humanity."

M.A. Bradstock, the president of NZWTA at the time, suggested to the annual meeting of the organisation in 1959 that the status of a teacher could be determined by their role and impact within the community. She noted that "teachers should be acknowledged as one of the key persons in our society" and the quality of the relationships between "teachers and their fellow citizens...would lead to a fuller education for young people who would be the makers of tomorrow's history."

=== Women as inspectors of schools ===
The president of NSTWA told the conference in 1918 that there was "no logical reason for debarring women teachers from appointment as inspectors" despite the claims that women would not be able to travel to more remote schools. A motion was adopted in 1920 reaffirming that the inspectorate should consist of both men and women. In May 1923, within a discussion around a remit for women in the inspectorate, it was suggested that this was an example of how more direct involvement by women in education could solve some of the problems in the sector. But there was disappointment that there had not been any appointments despite the Minister saying he would do so, and previously having expressed that if women were fit to do the job this should happen. The Conference wondered if what was required was a "super woman." The Minister for Education C.J. Parr responding later to a deputation from NZWTA, said he was at variance with his advisors who were opposed to women as inspectors and intended to "lay down an instruction to the Public Service Commissioner and the Director of Education, that the time has arrived when women inspectors should be appointed...[as]...a matter of policy which the Minister controls." The Taranaki News was cited as claiming that Carr had shown genuine courage and "set an example to other Ministers as to how real control can be exercised in spite of the hospitality of departmental heads."

=== Differentiated pay scales ===
The 1924 conference of the Association passed a remit strongly protesting against "the invidious differentiation recently introduced by the Education Department in respect of the salaries to be paid to men and women teachers for services of equal value to the State."

A presentation to the Education Department was made by a delegation from the New Zealand Women Teachers' Association, headed by C. M. Rain, the Dominion president in November 1946 asking for "the removal of anomalies that affect[ed] women teachers' salaries." Specific anomalies identified were differences in salaries paid to senior men and senior women, fewer opportunities for teachers doing specialist work to be promoted, and unequal pay rates for single men and single women in the profession.

=== Employment of married teachers ===
On 20 February 1930, the New Zealand Minister for Education Harry Atmore informed the Auckland Education Board that he had approved of legislation which would allow discretionary powers of Education Boards to appoint married women. It was noted that a letter from the New Zealand Women Teacher's Association supported this.

=== Education of girls ===
When the Council of Education prepared a report in 1916 on the education of girls "with special reference to the differentiation of the school work of girls and boys", Nellie Coad, as the NZWTA delegate to the Council unsuccessfully proposed a motion that the report was "unsound". NZWTA, however, approved the proposals in the report because they "aimed at modifying and improving the present system of education rather than suggesting any revolutionary change" and Emily Chaplin noted that the proposed changes would address the fact that [up to that time] "education of boys had been regarded as the prominent thing."

=== School conditions ===
In 1919 NZWTA raised concerns about the design of school playgrounds and buildings and suggested this was as important as what was being promoted in town planning to provide suitable housing. It was put that "small, ill-equipped schools" needed to be consolidated and have higher quality equipment and "spacious grounds for gardens and playing fields" Following remits by NZWTA to Arnold Nordmeyer, the acting minister of education, in August 1946 asking for improvements in school conditions, the Minister acknowledged the need to improve the heating and cleaning of schools, the provision of more equipment and the introduction of a "liberal staffing schedule...[to]...afford a measure of relief for the infant mistress in her duties."

=== Issues in infant education ===
NZWTA lobbied early for adequate levels of staffing in infant departments of all primary schools in New Zealand. The organisation also too the position that all new buildings for infant education should have "assembly halls, separate cloak rooms, staff and lunch rooms, and windows in keeping with the modern ideals of infant teaching." At its annual meeting on 7 April 1922, The Wellington Women Teachers' Association passed remits concerning infant education for consideration at the National level. The remits called for all new buildings to have separate cloak rooms, a space to eat lunch and adequate modern windows; the supply of kindergarten materials that were suitable for New Zealand schools; a restriction of infant class sizes to no more than 25 students; and a recognition of "extra educational qualifications possessed by [some] infant teachers."

=== Class sizes ===
Reduction of class sizes was seen by NZWTA as one of the most important reforms required in New Zealand Schools. At the conference on 31 December 1917, the association approved the principle that classes with one teacher should be limited to forty students and "not more than sixty if assisted by a full-time pupil-teacher." In 1944 a deputation from the Wellington Branch presented their case to the National Council of Women that overcoming "public apathy" was the key and listed several concerns about overcrowding. By insufficient individual attention, children were said to be in danger of becoming submerged [into a] "large mass, which was responsible for the destruction of initiative and self-reliance and the hindering of the development of personality and individuality." Social and life skills likely to be adversely affected by overcrowding included developing the "mental powers and talent for leadership", learning to organise themselves into "groups under elected leaders to tackle problem incidental to their school work" and modifying their freedom by being considerate of others. Following the presentation by the delegation, the resolution was adopted in support of reducing the size of school classes to a maximum of 35 pupils as recommended by NZEI.

== Later years ==
On 1 April 1961, the Government Service Equal Pay Act came into force in New Zealand. The key principle of the Act was that women employed by the Government should be paid the same as men when the work was equal and done under equal conditions. NZWTA had continued to support the principal of equal pay for equal work but in 1957 withdrew from the Council for Equal Pay and Opportunity (CEPO) objecting to how the council had politicised the issue. By that stage NZWTA's membership had declined and become more of a social organisation with some branches having gone into recess. Importantly though, they had convinced NZEI to continue supporting the cause of equal pay for women teachers. In 1961 the NZWTA national executive "decided to cancel further annual and executive meetings and review the situation in two years' time. In 1964 the association went into recess".
