= New Plymouth (electorate) =

- Single-member general constituency for the New Zealand House of Representatives
- Interactive map of boundaries from the 2026 election
- Formation: 1853, 1928
- Region: Taranaki
- Character: Urban and rural
- Term: 3 years

Member for New Plymouth
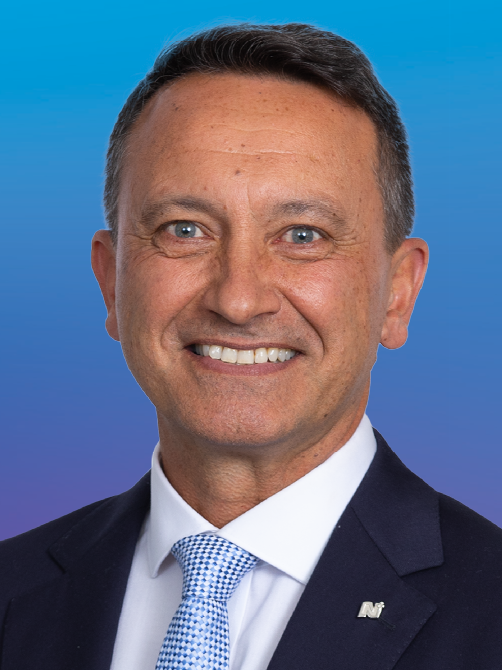
- David MacLeod since 14 October 2023
- Party: National
- List MPs: Glen Bennett (Labour)
- Previous MP: Glen Bennett (Labour)
Party vote distribution

New Plymouth is a New Zealand parliamentary electorate. It was first created for the 1st New Zealand Parliament in 1853 and has existed since, with one 32-year interruption. The electorate was initially called Town of New Plymouth.

The electorate is currently held by David MacLeod for National. He defeated Labour’s Glen Bennett in the 2023 general election by 6,991 votes.

== Population centres ==
Map of boundaries at the 2020 and 2023 general elections

In the 1927 electoral redistribution, the North Island gained a further electorate from the South Island due to faster population growth. Five electorates were abolished, two former electorates, including New Plymouth, were re-established, and three electorates were created for the first time. At the 2014 election, the electorate's southern boundary would move south to include Ōpunake. At the 2025 boundary review, the boundary with Taranaki-King Country would be adjusted to include Waitara wholly within the electorate.

The electorate includes the following population centres:

- New Plymouth
- Bell Block
- Waitara
- Ōpunake
- Ōakura
- Ōkato
- Egmont Village
- Rahotu

== History ==
The electorate was originally the Town of New Plymouth from 1853 to 1879. The name of the electorate was changed to New Plymouth from 1879 to 1896. The electorate was abolished in 1896, and was reconstituted under the same name in 1928.

Oliver Samuel, Edward Smith, Thomas Kelly (incumbent) and Charles Brown contested the electorate in the 1884 election; Samuel won the contest.

The electorate has changed between National and Labour several times, and has been represented by two Christian ministers: Rev Fred Frost and then Rev Ernest Aderman. New Plymouth is generally seen as a marginal seat.

=== Members of Parliament ===
Unless otherwise stated, all MPs terms began and ended at a general election.

Key

Independent Liberal United National Labour

Election	Winner
1853 election	Francis Gledhill
1855 election	William Richmond
1860 election	William Richmond
1862 by-election	Isaac Newton Watt
1863 by-election	Henry Hanson Turton
1864 by-election	Charles Brown
1865 by-election	Henry Sewell
1866 election	John Richardson
1867 by-election	Harry Atkinson
1869 by-election	Thomas Kelly
1871 election	Thomas Kelly
1875 election	Thomas Kelly
1879 election	Thomas Kelly
1881 election	Thomas Kelly
1884 election	Oliver Samuel
1887 election	Oliver Samuel
1890 election	Edward Smith
1893 election	Edward Smith
(Electorate abolished 1896–1928, see Taranaki)
1928 election	Sydney George Smith
1931 election	Sydney George Smith
1935 election	Sydney George Smith
1938 election	Fred Frost
1943 election	Ernest Aderman
1946 election	Ernest Aderman
1949 election	Ernest Aderman
1951 election	Ernest Aderman
1954 election	Ernest Aderman
1957 election	Ernest Aderman
1960 election	Ernest Aderman
1963 election	Ernest Aderman
1966 election	Ron Barclay
1969 election	Ron Barclay
1972 election	Ron Barclay
1975 election	Tony Friedlander
1978 election	Tony Friedlander
1981 election	Tony Friedlander
1984 election	Tony Friedlander
1987 election	Harry Duynhoven
1990 election	John Armstrong
1993 election	Harry Duynhoven
1996 election	Harry Duynhoven
1999 election	Harry Duynhoven
2002 election	Harry Duynhoven
2005 election	Harry Duynhoven
2008 election	Jonathan Young
2011 election	Jonathan Young
2014 election	Jonathan Young
2017 election	Jonathan Young
2020 election	Glen Bennett
2023 election	David MacLeod

=== List MPs ===
Members of Parliament elected from party lists in elections where that person also unsuccessfully contested the New Plymouth electorate. Unless otherwise stated, all MPs terms began and ended at general elections.

Election	Winner
1996 election	Roger Maxwell
2011 election	Andrew Little
2014 election	Andrew Little
2024	Glen Bennett

== Election results ==
=== 2026 election ===
The next election will be held on 7 November 2026. Candidates for New Plymouth are listed at Candidates in the 2026 New Zealand general election by electorate § New Plymouth. Official results will be available after 27 November 2026.

=== 2023 election ===
2023 general election: New Plymouth
Notes:	Blue background denotes the winner of the electorate vote. Pink background denotes a candidate elected from their party list. Yellow background denotes an electorate win by a list member, or other incumbent. A ✓ or ✗ denotes status of any incumbent, win or lose respectively.						
Party	Candidate	Votes	%	±%	Party votes	%	±%
National	David MacLeod	22,483	52.31	+10.58	18,208	42.01	+12.02
Labour	✗ Glen Bennett	15,492	36.04	−11.46	10,442	24.09	−24.03
ACT	Bruce McGechan	1,957	4.55	+2.60	4,388	10.13	+2.19
NZ Loyal	Warren Willetts	1,738	4.04	—	942	2.17	—
Animal Justice	Hamish Watkins	562	1.31	—	88	0.20	—
New Nation	Greg Robinson	252	0.59	—	117	0.27	—
Green					3,674	8.48	+3.89
NZ First					3,134	7.23	+4.98
Opportunities					848	1.96	+1.38
Te Pāti Māori					617	1.42	+0.95
Legalise Cannabis					202	0.47	+0.28
NewZeal					180	0.42	+0.23
Freedoms NZ					149	0.34	—
DemocracyNZ					54	0.12	—
New Conservatives					54	0.12	—
Women's Rights					8	0.12	—
Leighton Baker Party					24	0.06	—
Informal votes		499			163		
Total valid votes		42,983			43,335		
Turnout		43,335					
National gain from Labour	Majority	6,991	16.26	+10.49			

=== 2020 election ===
2020 general election: New Plymouth
Notes:	Blue background denotes the winner of the electorate vote. Pink background denotes a candidate elected from their party list. Yellow background denotes an electorate win by a list member, or other incumbent. A ✓ or ✗ denotes status of any incumbent, win or lose respectively.						
Party	Candidate	Votes	%	±%	Party votes	%	±%
Labour	Glen Bennett	21,030	47.50	+14.91	21,394	48.12	+14.04
National	✗ Jonathan Young	18,475	41.73	−10.28	13,336	29.99	−18.62
New Conservative	Murray Chong	1,347	3.04	—	765	1.72	+1.32
ACT	Ada Xiao	864	1.95	+0.86	3,534	7.94	+7.39
Opportunities	Dan Thurston Crow	745	1.68	—	787	1.77	−0.95
Advance NZ	Rowena Wood	601	1.35	—	567	1.27	—
Independent	Rusty Kane	325	0.73	—			
Social Credit	Kath Lauderdale	115	0.25	—	53	0.11	+0.10
Green					2,044	4.59	+0.08
NZ First					1,001	2.25	−5.49
Legalise Cannabis					258	0.58	+0.18
Māori Party					212	0.47	−0.15
ONE					85	0.19	—
Outdoors					40	0.08	+0.02
Vision NZ					35	0.07	—
Sustainable NZ					20	0.04	—
Heartland					10	0.02	—
TEA					8	0.02	—
Informal votes		769			306		
Total valid votes		44,271			44,455		
Turnout		44,455					
Labour gain from National	Majority	2,555	5.77				

=== 2017 election ===
2017 general election: New Plymouth
Notes:	Blue background denotes the winner of the electorate vote. Pink background denotes a candidate elected from their party list. Yellow background denotes an electorate win by a list member, or other incumbent. A ✓ or ✗ denotes status of any incumbent, win or lose respectively.						
Party	Candidate	Votes	%	±%	Party votes	%	±%
National	✓ Jonathan Young	20,711	52.01	−5.74	19,517	48.63	−7.05
Labour	Corie Haddock	12,978	32.59	+1.03	13,662	34.04	+12.90
NZ First	Murray Chong	3,041	7.63	—	3,107	7.74	−1.26
Green	Stuart Jeanne Bramhall	2,070	5.19	−0.23	1,798	4.47	−3.50
ACT	Anneka Carlson	434	1.09	+0.54	222	0.55	+0.09
Independent	Basil Lawrence	148	0.37	—			
Opportunities					1,093	2.72	—
Māori Party					250	0.62	+0.09
Legalise Cannabis					163	0.40	−0.18
Conservative					65	0.16	−3.03
Ban 1080					39	0.09	−0.06
United Future					36	0.08	−0.10
Outdoors					26	0.06	—
People's Party					16	0.03	—
Democrats					8	0.01	−0.06
Mana					8	0.01	−0.69
Internet					7	0.01	−0.69
Informal votes		434			118		
Total valid votes		39,816			40,135		
Turnout		40,365	80.68	+2.63			
National hold	Majority	7,733	19.42	−6.76			

=== 2014 election ===
2014 general election: New Plymouth
Notes:	Blue background denotes the winner of the electorate vote. Pink background denotes a candidate elected from their party list. Yellow background denotes an electorate win by a list member, or other incumbent. A ✓ or ✗ denotes status of any incumbent, win or lose respectively.						
Party	Candidate	Votes	%	±%	Party votes	%	±%
National	✓ Jonathan Young	21,566	57.75	+4.14	20,969	55.65	+2.39
Labour	Andrew Little	11,788	31.56	−8.85	7,947	21.10	−4.72
Green	Sarah Roberts	2,025	5.42	+1.56	3,005	7.97	−1.68
Legalise Cannabis	Jamie Dombroski	701	1.88	+0.55	218	0.58	+0.06
Conservative	Angela Storr	633	1.69	+1.69	1,201	3.19	+1.22
ACT	Lucy Gray (stood as James Gray)	205	0.55	+0.55	172	0.46	−0.56
NZ First					3,395	9.00	+2.70
Internet Mana					263	0.70	+0.49 (Note: 2014 Internet Mana swing is relative to the votes for Mana in 2011; it shared a party list with Internet in the 2014 election.)
Māori Party					199	0.53	−0.08
United Future					66	0.18	−0.27
Ban 1080					57	0.15	+0.15
Civilian					57	0.15	+0.15
Democrats					28	0.07	+0.01
Independent Coalition					10	0.03	+0.03
Focus					10	0.03	+0.03
Informal votes		429			128		
Total valid votes		37,347			37,681		
Turnout		37,681	77.51	+2.06			
National hold	Majority	9,778	26.18	+13.28			

=== 2011 election ===
2011 general election: New Plymouth
Notes:	Blue background denotes the winner of the electorate vote. Pink background denotes a candidate elected from their party list. Yellow background denotes an electorate win by a list member, or other incumbent. A ✓ or ✗ denotes status of any incumbent, win or lose respectively.						
Party	Candidate	Votes	%	±%	Party votes	%	±%
National	✓ Jonathan Young	17,644	53.31	+5.13	18,073	53.26	+2.79
Labour	Andrew Little	13,374	40.41	−7.47	8,761	25.82	−5.60
Green	Geoff Steedman	1,277	3.86	+3.86	3,276	9.65	+3.23
Legalise Cannabis	Jamie Dombroski	439	1.33	+1.33	178	0.52	+0.05
Independent	Rusty Kane	361	1.09	−1.11			
NZ First					2,137	6.30	+2.25
Conservative					667	1.97	+1.97
ACT					347	1.02	−2.16
Māori Party					207	0.61	−0.14
United Future					154	0.45	−0.20
Mana					72	0.21	+0.21
Libertarianz					30	0.09	+0.01
Democrats					19	0.06	−0.07
Alliance					11	0.03	−0.06
Informal votes		808			235		
Total valid votes		33,095			33,932		
National hold	Majority	4,270	12.90	+12.60			

Electorate (as at 26 November 2011): 44,973

=== 2008 election ===
2008 general election: New Plymouth
Notes:	Blue background denotes the winner of the electorate vote. Pink background denotes a candidate elected from their party list. Yellow background denotes an electorate win by a list member, or other incumbent. A ✓ or ✗ denotes status of any incumbent, win or lose respectively.						
Party	Candidate	Votes	%	±%	Party votes	%	±%
National	Jonathan Young	16,539	48.18		17,512	50.47	
Labour	✗ Harry Duynhoven	16,434	47.88		10,901	31.42	
Independent	Rusty Kane	756	2.20				
ACT	Chris Albers	455	1.33		1,106	3.19	
Libertarianz	Mike Webber	141	0.41		27	0.08	
Green					2,230	6.43	
NZ First					1,404	4.05	
Bill and Ben					301	0.87	
Māori Party					260	0.75	
Progressive					232	0.67	
United Future					227	0.65	
Legalise Cannabis					166	0.48	
Family Party					141	0.41	
Kiwi					78	0.22	
Democrats					43	0.12	
Alliance					31	0.09	
Pacific					23	0.07	
Workers Party					13	0.04	
RAM					2	0.01	
RONZ					2	0.01	
Informal votes		349			175		
Total valid votes		34,325			34,699		
National gain from Labour	Majority	105	0.31				

=== 2005 election ===
2005 general election: New Plymouth
Notes:	Blue background denotes the winner of the electorate vote. Pink background denotes a candidate elected from their party list. Yellow background denotes an electorate win by a list member, or other incumbent. A ✓ or ✗ denotes status of any incumbent, win or lose respectively.						
Party	Candidate	Votes	%	±%	Party votes	%	±%
Labour	✓ Harry Duynhoven	17,512	53.20		12,542	37.64	
National	Moira Irving	12,073	36.67		14,836	44.53	
Green	Sarah Brown	1,165	3.54		1,816	5.45	
Destiny	Keren Roberts	555	1.69		244	0.73	
United Future	Matt Collier	539	1.64		791	2.37	
Māori Party	Tony Ruakere	312	0.95		148	0.44	
ACT	Kerry O'Connor	301	0.91		394	1.18	
Independent	Rusty Kane	252	0.77				
Democrats	Kevin Smith	121	0.37		52	1.18	0.16
NZ First					2,036	6.11	
Progressive					249	0.75	
Legalise Cannabis					86	0.26	
Christian Heritage					36	0.11	
Alliance					18	0.05	
Direct Democracy					15	0.05	
Libertarianz					14	0.04	
One NZ					12	0.04	
99 MP					12	0.04	
Family Rights					11	0.03	
RONZ					7	0.03	
Informal votes		338			126		
Total valid votes		32,919			33,319		
Labour hold	Majority	5,439					

=== 1999 election ===
1999 general election: New Plymouth
Notes:	Blue background denotes the winner of the electorate vote. Pink background denotes a candidate elected from their party list. Yellow background denotes an electorate win by a list member, or other incumbent. A ✓ or ✗ denotes status of any incumbent, win or lose respectively.						
Party	Candidate	Votes	%	±%	Party votes	%	±%
Labour	✓ Harry Duynhoven	22,118	68.48	+6.81	13,612	41.98	+12.80
National	Len Jury	7,026	21.75		9,487	29.26	−6.90
Christian Democrats	Tom Smithers	1,048	3.24		606	1.87	
Alliance	Bonnie Johnstone	870	2.69		2,425	7.48	−2.26
ACT	Moira Irving	595	1.84		1,804	5.56	+1.13
NZ First	Mae Neuman	515	1.59		1,201	3.70	−8.17
The People's Choice	Rusty Kane	80	0.25		48	0.15	
Mana Wahine Te Ira Tangata	Shona Eriksen	25	0.08				
Mauri Pacific	Sharon Faloon	21	0.07		13	0.04	
Green					1,734	5.35	
Christian Heritage					678	2.09	
Legalise Cannabis					426	1.31	−0.60
United NZ					126	0.39	−0.27
Libertarianz					104	0.32	+0.29
Animals First					67	0.21	−0.02
McGillicuddy Serious					45	0.14	−0.14
One NZ					14	0.04	
Natural Law					12	0.04	−0.10
Mana Māori					7	0.02	−0.04
NMP					5	0.02	
Freedom Movement					4	0.01	
Republican					2	0.01	
South Island					2	0.01	
Informal votes		464			340		
Total valid votes		32,298			32,422		
Labour hold	Majority	15,092	46.73	+12.45			

=== 1996 election ===
1996 general election: New Plymouth
Notes:	Blue background denotes the winner of the electorate vote. Pink background denotes a candidate elected from their party list. Yellow background denotes an electorate win by a list member, or other incumbent. A ✓ or ✗ denotes status of any incumbent, win or lose respectively.						
Party	Candidate	Votes	%	±%	Party votes	%	±%
Labour	✓ Harry Duynhoven	20,746	61.67	+12.70	9,833	29.18	
National	✗ Roger Maxwell	9,213	27.39		12,185	36.16	
NZ First	Harry Slaats	1,771	5.26		3,999	11.87	
Alliance	Sue Gaffy	1,277	3.80		3,282	9.74	
ACT	Tony Huston	391	1.16		1,492	4.43	
Progressive Green	Paul O'Neill	181	0.54		100	0.30	
Natural Law	Bruce Sowry	63	0.19	−0.16	48	0.14	
Christian Coalition					1,619	4.80	
Legalise Cannabis					642	1.91	
United NZ					223	0.66	
McGillicuddy Serious					93	0.28	
Animals First					77	0.23	
Green Society					21	0.06	
Mana Māori					20	0.06	
Conservatives					19	0.06	
Superannuitants & Youth					14	0.04	
Libertarianz					11	0.03	
Ethnic Minority Party					8	0.02	
Advance New Zealand					7	0.02	
Asia Pacific United					2	0.01	
Te Tawharau					1	0.00	
Informal votes		205			151		
Total valid votes		33,642			33,696		
Labour hold	Majority	11,533	34.28				

=== 1993 election ===
1993 general election: New Plymouth
Party	Candidate	Votes	%	±%
Labour	Harry Duynhoven	10,481	48.97	+8.56
National	John Armstrong	7,355	34.37	−14.44
Alliance	Heather Smith	2,182	10.19	
NZ First	Lindsay Calvert	1,087	5.07	
Christian Heritage	H Starrenburgh	217	1.01	
Natural Law	Bruce Sowry	77	0.35	
Majority		3,126	14.60	
Turnout		21,399	85.31	−0.78
Registered electors		25,082		

=== 1990 election ===
1990 general election: New Plymouth
Party	Candidate	Votes	%	±%
National	John Armstrong	9,883	48.81	
Labour	Harry Duynhoven	8,182	40.41	−9.11
Green	Leon Roborgh	1,425	7.03	
NewLabour	P Mepham	476	2.35	
Democrats	Harry Alchin-Smith	179	0.88	
McGillicuddy Serious	M B Johnston	100	0.49	
Majority		1,701	8.40	
Turnout		20,245	86.09	−3.60
Registered electors		23,515		

=== 1987 election ===
1987 general election: New Plymouth
Party	Candidate	Votes	%	±%
Labour	Harry Duynhoven	10,320	49.52	
National	Tony Friedlander	9,883	47.43	+2.74
Democrats	K D Steele	413	1.98	
NZ Party	Bruce McCready	131	0.62	
Values	G A McDonald	89	0.42	
Majority		337	1.61	
Turnout		20,836	89.69	−3.08
Registered electors		23,229		

=== 1984 election ===
1984 general election: New Plymouth
Party	Candidate	Votes	%	±%
National	Tony Friedlander	9,900	44.99	−1.49
Labour	Ida Gaskin	9,631	43.77	
NZ Party	Lloyd Horn	1,656	7.52	
Social Credit	George McPeak	645	2.93	−10.37
Values	Janet Roborgh	154	0.69	−0.59
Republican	M J K Petrie	17	0.07	
Majority		269	1.22	−6.32
Turnout		22,003	92.77	+1.83
Registered electors		23,717		

=== 1981 election ===
1981 general election: New Plymouth
Party	Candidate	Votes	%	±%
National	Tony Friedlander	9,649	46.48	+3.87
Labour	Dennis Duggan	8,082	38.93	−3.13
Social Credit	George McPeak	2,762	13.30	
Values	Janet Roborgh	266	1.28	−1.06
Majority		1,567	7.54	+6.99
Turnout		20,759	90.94	+16.23
Registered electors		22,827		

=== 1978 election ===
1978 general election: New Plymouth
Party	Candidate	Votes	%	±%
National	Tony Friedlander	8,650	42.61	−6.80
Labour	Dennis Duggan	8,538	42.06	
Social Credit	R A Kirk	2,634	12.97	
Values	Janet Roborgh	476	2.34	
Majority		112	0.55	−8.70
Turnout		20,298	74.71	−12.29
Registered electors		27,167		

=== 1975 election ===
1975 general election: New Plymouth
Party	Candidate	Votes	%	±%
National	Tony Friedlander	10,330	49.41	
Labour	Ron Barclay	8,395	40.15	−10.48
Social Credit	A J Swanney	1,381	6.60	+
Values	Edith Green	798	3.81	
Majority		1,935	9.25	
Turnout		20,904	87.00	−5.13
Registered electors		24,027		

=== 1972 election ===
1972 general election: New Plymouth
Party	Candidate	Votes	%	±%
Labour	Ron Barclay	9,429	50.63	+0.22
National	Terry Boon	8,133	43.67	
Social Credit	A J Swanney	715	3.83	
Values	W P Neilson	280	1.50	
Liberal Reform	D V Hannah	49	0.26	
New Democratic	M A Pinkney	16	0.08	
Majority		1,296	6.95	+1.44
Turnout		18,622	92.13	−0.22
Registered electors		20,212		

=== 1969 election ===
1969 general election: New Plymouth
Party	Candidate	Votes	%	±%
Labour	Ron Barclay	9,149	50.41	+5.93
National	Brian Clark	8,149	44.90	+0.85
Social Credit	Stuart Dickson	763	4.20	
Country Party	Clifford Stanley Emeny	85	0.46	
Majority		1,000	5.51	+5.09
Turnout		18,146	92.35	+3.57
Registered electors		19,649		

=== 1966 election ===
1966 general election: New Plymouth
Party	Candidate	Votes	%	±%
Labour	Ron Barclay	8,073	44.48	−4.09
National	Brian Clark	7,995	44.05	
Social Credit	T G Mullins	1,129	6.22	
Majority		78	0.42	
Turnout		18,146	95.92	−4.21
Registered electors		18,916		

=== 1963 election ===
1963 general election: New Plymouth
Party	Candidate	Votes	%	±%
National	Ernest Aderman	8,535	51.42	−0.36
Labour	Ron Barclay	8,061	48.57	+6.46
Majority		474	2.85	−6.82
Turnout		16,596	91.71	+0.05
Registered electors		18,095		

- Social Credit candidate Kenneth "Ken" George Joseph Lattimer failed to lodge his name in time to contest the election.

=== 1960 election ===
1960 general election: New Plymouth
Party	Candidate	Votes	%	±%
National	Ernest Aderman	9,063	51.78	+1.87
Labour	Ron Barclay	7,370	42.11	−3.89
Social Credit	Ken Lattimer	1,068	6.10	+2.02
Majority		1,693	9.67	+5.76
Turnout		17,501	91.66	−2.56
Registered electors		19,092		

=== 1957 election ===
1957 general election: New Plymouth
Party	Candidate	Votes	%	±%
National	Ernest Aderman	8,386	49.91	−0.29
Labour	Ron Barclay	7,729	46.00	
Social Credit	Ken Lattimer	686	4.08	
Majority		657	3.91	−3.69
Turnout		16,801	94.22	+0.55
Registered electors		17,831		

=== 1954 election ===
1954 general election: New Plymouth
Party	Candidate	Votes	%	±%
National	Ernest Aderman	7,780	50.20	−7.43
Labour	Clarence Robert Parker	6,602	42.60	+0.24
Social Credit	C A Lattimer	1,114	7.18	
Majority		1,178	7.60	−7.66
Turnout		15,496	93.67	+0.67
Registered electors		16,542		

=== 1951 election ===
1951 general election: New Plymouth
Party	Candidate	Votes	%	±%
National	Ernest Aderman	8,816	57.63	+2.57
Labour	Clarence Robert Parker	6,481	42.36	−2.57
Majority		2,335	15.26	+5.14
Turnout		15,297	93.00	−3.11
Registered electors		16,448		

=== 1949 election ===
1949 general election: New Plymouth
Party	Candidate	Votes	%	±%
National	Ernest Aderman	8,250	55.06	+3.66
Labour	Clarence Robert Parker	6,733	44.93	
Majority		1,517	10.12	+7.32
Turnout		14,983	96.11	+0.29
Registered electors		15,589		

=== 1946 election ===
1946 general election: New Plymouth
Party	Candidate	Votes	%	±%
National	Ernest Aderman	7,426	51.40	+5.17
Labour	George Nimmo	7,021	48.59	
Majority		405	2.80	+2.40
Turnout		14,447	96.40	−0.08
Registered electors		14,985		

=== 1943 election ===
1943 general election: New Plymouth
Party	Candidate	Votes	%	±%
National	Ernest Aderman	6,608	46.23	
Labour	Fred Frost	6,550	45.83	−7.22
Independent	Havelock Victor McCready	689	4.82	
Democratic Labour	Leonard Arthur Jury	299	2.09	
Informal votes		145	1.01	−0.49
Majority		58	0.40	
Turnout		14,291	96.32	+0.36
Registered electors		14,836		

=== 1938 election ===
1938 general election: New Plymouth
Party	Candidate	Votes	%	±%
Labour	Fred Frost	6,958	53.05	+13.52
National	Sydney George Smith	6,089	46.43	+0.10
Informal votes		69	0.52	−0.87
Majority		869	6.62	
Turnout		13,116	95.96	+3.91
Registered electors		13,668		

=== 1935 election ===
1935 general election: New Plymouth
Party	Candidate	Votes	%	±%
United	Sydney George Smith	5,662	46.33	−19.70
Labour	Fred Frost	4,831	39.53	
Independent	Elsie Andrews	786	6.43	
Democrat	H Cave	676	5.53	
Independent Labour	William Sheat	264	2.16	−31.81
Informal votes		170	1.39	±0.00
Majority		831	6.80	−25.25
Turnout		12,219	92.05	+5.34
Registered electors		13,273		

=== 1931 election ===
1931 general election: New Plymouth
Party	Candidate	Votes	%	±%
United	Sydney George Smith	7,152	66.03	+15.23
Labour	William Sheat	3,680	33.97	
Informal votes		153	1.39	+0.78
Majority		3,472	32.05	+18.69
Turnout		10,985	86.71	−4.86
Registered electors		12,668		

=== 1928 election ===
1928 general election: New Plymouth
Party	Candidate	Votes	%	±%
United	Sydney George Smith	5,577	50.79	
Reform	Charles Bellringer	4,110	37.43	
Labour	W G Simpson	1,293	11.78	
Majority		1,467	13.36	
Informal votes		68	0.62	
Turnout		11,048	91.57	
Registered electors		12,065		

=== 1893 election ===
1893 general election: New Plymouth
Party	Candidate	Votes	%	±%
Liberal	Edward Smith	1,782	55.07	+15.21
Conservative	Robert Trimble	1,291	39.89	
Independent	Richard Price	163	5.04	
Majority		491	15.17	+13.47
Turnout		3,236	78.73	+16.60
Registered electors		4,110		

=== 1890 election ===
1890 general election: New Plymouth
Party	Candidate	Votes	%	±%
Liberal	Edward Smith	539	39.86	
Conservative	John Elliot	516	38.16	
Independent	R C Hughes	297	21.96	
Majority		23	1.70	
Turnout		1,352	62.13	
Registered electors		2,176		

=== 1869 by-election ===
1869 Town of New Plymouth by-election
Party	Candidate	Votes	%	±%
Independent	Thomas Kelly	57	48.72	
Independent	Frederic Carrington	45	38.46	
Independent	James Thomas Upjohn	15	12.82	
Majority		12	10.26	
Turnout		117		
