= 37th New Zealand Parliament =

Term of the Parliament of New Zealand

37th Parliament of New Zealand
←	36th Parliament	38th Parliament	→
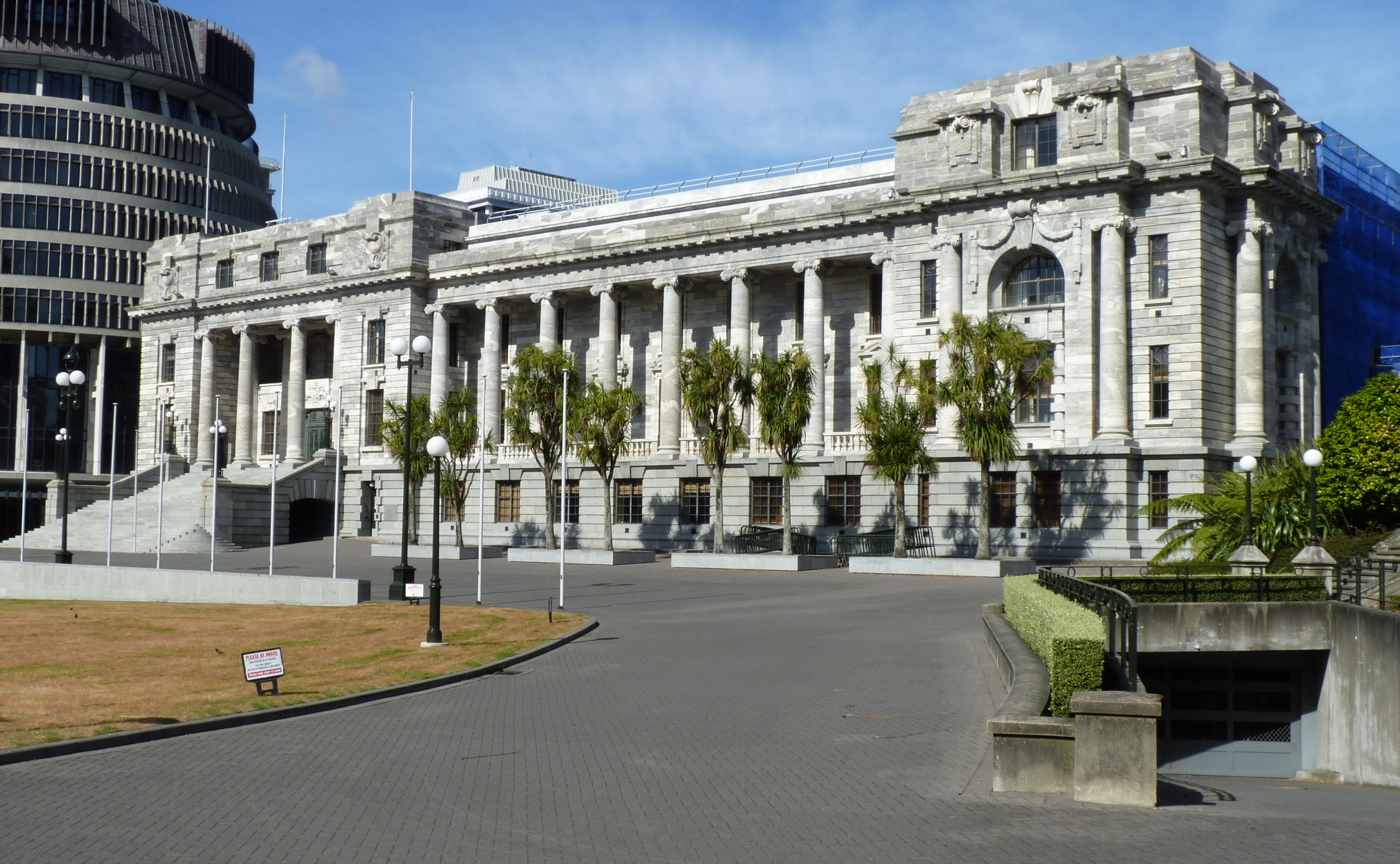
- Parliament House, Wellington

Overview
- Legislative body: New Zealand Parliament
- Term: 14 February 1973 – 10 October 1975
- Election: 1972 New Zealand general election
- Government: Third Labour Government

House of Representatives
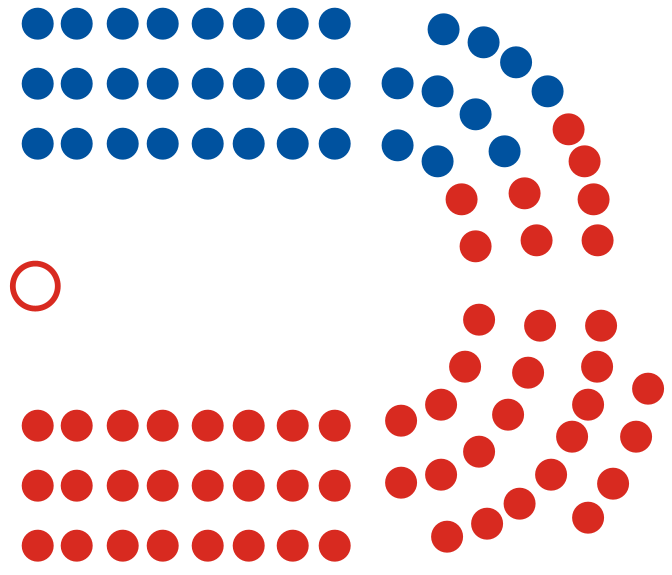
- Members: 87
- Speaker of the House: Stanley Whitehead
- Prime Minister: Bill Rowling — Hugh Watt (acting) until 6 September 1974 — Norman Kirk until 31 August 1974 †
- Leader of the Opposition: Robert Muldoon — Jack Marshall until 9 July 1974

Sovereign
- Monarch: Elizabeth II
- Governor-General: Denis Blundell

The 37th New Zealand Parliament was a term of the New Zealand Parliament. It was elected at the 1972 general election on 25 November of that year.

== 1972 general election ==
The 1972 general election was held on Saturday, 25 November. A total of 87 MPs were elected; 58 represented North Island electorates, 25 represented South Island electorates, and the remaining four represented Māori electorates; this was an increase in the number of MPs by three since the 1969 election, and the gain was all for the North Island. 1,583,256 voters were enrolled and the official turnout at the election was 89.1%.

== Sessions ==
The 37th Parliament sat for three sessions, and was prorogued on 10 October 1975.

Session	Opened	Adjourned
first	14 February 1973	23 November 1973
second	4 February 1974	8 November 1974
third	25 March 1975	10 October 1975

== Ministries ==
The National Party, which had come to power at the 1960 election, was defeated by the Labour Party at the 1972 election. Norman Kirk formed the third Labour Government and led the Kirk Ministry until his sudden death on 31 August 1974. After Hugh Watt had been acting Prime Minister for the first few days of September 1974, Kirk was succeeded by Bill Rowling on 6 September. The Rowling Ministry lasted until the end of the parliamentary term, when the Labour Government was defeated by National in the 1975 election.

== Overview of seats ==
The table below shows the number of MPs in each party following the 1972 election and at dissolution:

Affiliation	Members	
Affiliation	At 1972 election	At dissolution
Labour Government	55	55
National Opposition	32	32
Total	87	87
Working Government majority	23	23

Notes

- The Working Government majority is calculated as all Government MPs less all other parties.

== Initial composition of the 37th Parliament ==
The table below shows the results of the 1972 general election:

Key

National Labour Social Credit Independent

Electorate results for the 1972 New Zealand general election
Electorate	Incumbent	Winner	Majority	Runner up
General electorates
Auckland Central	Norman Douglas		2,009	Clive Edwards
Avon	John Mathison	Mary Batchelor	6,055	Gordon Thomas
Awarua	Hugh Templeton	Aubrey Begg	723	Hugh Templeton
Bay of Plenty	Percy Allen		2,189	G B Mead
Birkenhead	Norman King		1,533	Don McKinnon
Christchurch Central	Bruce Barclay		5,103	Barbara Beaven
Clutha	Peter Gordon		2,131	Les McKay
Coromandel	New electorate	Leo Schultz	2,181	Alyson Murphy
Dunedin Central	Brian MacDonell		3,771	Fred O'Neill
Dunedin North	Ethel McMillan		4,020	John Wallis
East Coast Bays	New electorate	Frank Gill	979	Brian Pauling
Eden	John Rae	Mike Moore	788	Mary Kidd
Egmont	Venn Young		2,928	Robert Logan Peck
Franklin	Alfred E. Allen	Bill Birch	4,188	Geoff Braybrooke
Gisborne	Esme Tombleson	Trevor Davey	488	Esme Tombleson
Grey Lynn	Eddie Isbey		5,487	Jens Meder
Hamilton East	New electorate	Rufus Rogers	397	Ross Jansen
Hamilton West	Leslie Munro	Dorothy Jelicich	544	Derek Heather
Hastings	Duncan MacIntyre	Richard Mayson	1,148	Duncan MacIntyre
Hawkes Bay	Richard Harrison		600	David Butcher
Henderson	Martyn Finlay		4,221	Ross C. MacFarlane
Heretaunga	Ron Bailey		2,964	John Schnellenberg
Hobson	Logan Sloane		1,148	Howard Manning
Hutt	Trevor Young		3,397	Michael Fowler
Invercargill	John Chewings	J. B. Munro	765	John Chewings
Island Bay	Gerald O'Brien		3,495	Bruce Farland
Kapiti	New electorate	Frank O'Flynn	706	Barry Brill
Karori	Jack Marshall		4,408	Adam Floyd
King Country	New electorate	Jim Bolger	1,240	Bruce Sakey
Lyttelton	Tom McGuigan		3,235	John Blumsky
Manawatu	Les Gandar	Allan McCready	427	Mervyn Hancock
Mangere	Colin Moyle		3,939	Stanley Lawson
Manukau	Roger Douglas		2,844	R O Price
Manurewa	Phil Amos		2,397	Pat Baker
Marlborough	Ian Brooks		1,290	Bruno Dalliessi
Miramar	Bill Young		434	Brian Edwards
Mt Albert	Warren Freer		3,980	John Malcolm
Napier	Gordon Christie		3,725	Merle Bell
Nelson	Stan Whitehead		1,933	Ian McWhannell
New Lynn	Jonathan Hunt		4,312	Gordon McDermott
New Plymouth	Ron Barclay		1,296	Terry Boon
North Shore	George Gair		2,821	Colin Chiles
Oamaru	Allan Dick	Bill Laney	390	Allan Dick
Onehunga	Hugh Watt		4,835	Peter Blakeborough
Otago Central	Murray Rose	Ian Quigley	1,483	Murray Rose
Otahuhu	New electorate	Bob Tizard	6,403	D C Brooker
Pahiatua	Keith Holyoake		4,359	L J Cairns
Pakuranga	Bob Tizard	Gavin Downie	1,802	J B Irwin
Palmerston North	Joe Walding		1,766	Paul William Mitchell
Papanui	Bert Walker		1,734	Mollie Clark
Petone	Fraser Colman		5,340	Nick Ursin
Piako	Jack Luxton		4,472	I L Howell
Porirua	Gerry Wall		4,399	Ross Doughty
Raglan	Douglas Carter		1,350	Allan John Smith
Rakaia	New electorate	Colin McLachlan	2,133	Alex Clark
Rangiora	Lorrie Pickering	Kerry Burke	866	Adrian Hiatt
Rangitikei	Norman Shelton	Roy Jack	3,037	N R Pearce (Note: Bruce Beetham came third for Social Credit in Rangitikei)
Remuera	Allan Highet		6,118	Rex Stanton
Riccarton	Eric Holland		2,164	David Jackson
Rodney	Peter Wilkinson		4,507	Peter Trim
Roskill	Arthur Faulkner		4,439	John Priestley
Rotorua	Harry Lapwood		786	N F Pachoud
Ruahine	New electorate	Les Gandar	552	Sam Mihaere
St Albans	Roger Drayton		3,066	Ron Doak
St Kilda	Bill Fraser		5,615	Charles Kirby
South Canterbury	Rob Talbot		2,035	David Braithwaite
Stratford	David Thomson		3,068	D G Turney
Sydenham	Norman Kirk		6,986	John Burn
Tamaki	Robert Muldoon		4,590	Alan Hedger
Tasman	New electorate	Bill Rowling	1,834	Gerald Hunt
Taupo	Rona Stevenson	Jack Ridley	783	Jim Higgins
Tauranga	George Walsh	Keith Allen	2,215	Henry Uttinger
Timaru	Sir Basil Arthur		3,954	Dave Walker
Waikato	Lance Adams-Schneider		4,208	Bob Reese
Wairarapa	Jack Williams		1,086	Ben Couch
Waitemata	Frank Gill	Michael Bassett	2,544	Ray La Varis
Wallace	Brian Talboys		2,904	Ian Lamont
Wanganui	Bill Tolhurst	Russell Marshall	2,879	Bill Tolhurst
Wellington Central	Dan Riddiford	Ken Comber	27	David Shand (Note: Shand was first on election night, but lost when special votes were included)
West Coast	New electorate	Paddy Blanchfield	4,242	Barry Dallas
Western Hutt	Henry May		2,392	Julian Watts (Note: Julian Watts was a son of Jack Watts)
Whangarei	New electorate	Murray Smith	1,180	Lawrence Carr
Wigram	Mick Connelly		5,255	David Cox
Māori electorates
Eastern Maori	Paraone Reweti		6,190	Koro Dewes
Northern Maori	Matiu Rata		5,260	Graham Latimer
Southern Maori	Whetu Tirikatene-Sullivan		8,251	Kate Parahi
Western Maori	Koro Wētere		8,686	R Te A H Rawiri

Table footnotes:

== Select committees ==
For the 37th Parliament, elected from the 1972 general election, there were the following select committees in the House of Representatives, as follows (Ministers of relevant portfolios are in bold):

Select committees in the 37th New Zealand Parliament
Select committee	Portfolios/Jurisdictions	Members
Defence
Defence	Military affairs, defence matters, disarmament and arms control	
Defence	Military affairs, defence matters, disarmament and arms control	Aubrey Begg
Defence	Military affairs, defence matters, disarmament and arms control	**Arthur Faulkner**
Defence	Military affairs, defence matters, disarmament and arms control	Richard Harrison
Defence	Military affairs, defence matters, disarmament and arms control	Allan McCready
Defence	Military affairs, defence matters, disarmament and arms control	Ian Quigley
Defence	Military affairs, defence matters, disarmament and arms control	David Thomson
Defence	Military affairs, defence matters, disarmament and arms control	Jack Williams
Education
Education	Education, education review, industry training, research	
Education	Education, education review, industry training, research	**Phil Amos**
Education	Education, education review, industry training, research	Jim Bolger
Education	Education, education review, industry training, research	Ian Brooks
Education	Education, education review, industry training, research	George Gair
Education	Education, education review, industry training, research	Les Gandar
Education	Education, education review, industry training, research	Bill Laney
Education	Education, education review, industry training, research	Russell Marshall
Foreign Affairs
Foreign Affairs	International relations, immigration, overseas trade	
Foreign Affairs	International relations, immigration, overseas trade	Ron Bailey
Foreign Affairs	International relations, immigration, overseas trade	Roger Drayton
Foreign Affairs	International relations, immigration, overseas trade	Arthur Faulkner
Foreign Affairs	International relations, immigration, overseas trade	Frank Gill
Foreign Affairs	International relations, immigration, overseas trade	Sir Keith Holyoake
Foreign Affairs	International relations, immigration, overseas trade	**Norman Kirk**
Foreign Affairs	International relations, immigration, overseas trade	Harry Lapwood
Foreign Affairs	International relations, immigration, overseas trade	Allan McCready
Foreign Affairs	International relations, immigration, overseas trade	Mike Moore
Foreign Affairs	International relations, immigration, overseas trade	Joe Walding
Foreign Affairs	International relations, immigration, overseas trade	Peter Wilkinson
House
House		**Ron Bailey**
House		Roger Douglas
House		Richard Harrison
House		Jonathan Hunt
House		Colin McLachlan
House		J. B. Munro
House		Bert Walker
Island Affairs
Island Affairs	Pacific Islands affairs	
Island Affairs	Pacific Islands affairs	**Phil Amos**
Island Affairs	Pacific Islands affairs	Gavin Downie
Island Affairs	Pacific Islands affairs	Eddie Isbey
Island Affairs	Pacific Islands affairs	Leo Schultz
Island Affairs	Pacific Islands affairs	Gerry Wall
Island Affairs	Pacific Islands affairs	Venn Young
Island Affairs	Pacific Islands affairs	Koro Wētere
Labour
Labour	Industrial relations and employment	
Labour	Industrial relations and employment	Norman Douglas
Labour	Industrial relations and employment	Eric Holland
Labour	Industrial relations and employment	Eddie Isbey
Labour	Industrial relations and employment	Dorothy Jelicich
Labour	Industrial relations and employment	Jack Luxton
Labour	Industrial relations and employment	Frank O'Flynn
Labour	Industrial relations and employment	Paraone Reweti
Labour	Industrial relations and employment	David Thomson
Labour	Industrial relations and employment	Bill Young
Labour	Industrial relations and employment	**Hugh Watt**
Lands and Agriculture
Lands and Agriculture	Agriculture, biosecurity, fisheries, forestry, lands, and land information	
Lands and Agriculture	Agriculture, biosecurity, fisheries, forestry, lands, and land information	Bruce Barclay
Lands and Agriculture	Agriculture, biosecurity, fisheries, forestry, lands, and land information	Aubrey Begg
Lands and Agriculture	Agriculture, biosecurity, fisheries, forestry, lands, and land information	Jim Bolger
Lands and Agriculture	Agriculture, biosecurity, fisheries, forestry, lands, and land information	Ian Brooks
Lands and Agriculture	Agriculture, biosecurity, fisheries, forestry, lands, and land information	Kerry Burke
Lands and Agriculture	Agriculture, biosecurity, fisheries, forestry, lands, and land information	Douglas Carter
Lands and Agriculture	Agriculture, biosecurity, fisheries, forestry, lands, and land information	**Colin Moyle**
Lands and Agriculture	Agriculture, biosecurity, fisheries, forestry, lands, and land information	Rob Talbot
Lands and Agriculture	Agriculture, biosecurity, fisheries, forestry, lands, and land information	Jack Williams
Lands and Agriculture	Agriculture, biosecurity, fisheries, forestry, lands, and land information	Venn Young
Library
Library	Parliamentary library	
Library	Parliamentary library	Lance Adams-Schneider
Library	Parliamentary library	Keith Allen
Library	Parliamentary library	Kerry Burke
Library	Parliamentary library	Norman Douglas
Library	Parliamentary library	Sir Roy Jack
Library	Parliamentary library	Ethel McMillan
Library	Parliamentary library	**Stanley Whitehead**
Local Bills
Local Bills		Keith Allen
Local Bills		Ron Barclay
Local Bills		Mary Batchelor
Local Bills		Allan Highet
Local Bills		Bill Laney
Local Bills		Colin McLachlan
Local Bills		Ethel McMillan
Local Bills		**Henry May**
Local Bills		Mike Moore
Local Bills		Gerald O'Brien
Local Bills		Logan Sloane
Māori Affairs
Māori Affairs	Māori affairs	
Māori Affairs	Māori affairs	Percy Allen
Māori Affairs	Māori affairs	Bill Birch
Māori Affairs	Māori affairs	Jack Luxton
Māori Affairs	Māori affairs	Russell Marshall
Māori Affairs	Māori affairs	Allan McCready
Māori Affairs	Māori affairs	**Matiu Rata**
Māori Affairs	Māori affairs	Paraone Reweti
Māori Affairs	Māori affairs	Whetu Tirikatene-Sullivan
Māori Affairs	Māori affairs	Leo Schultz
Māori Affairs	Māori affairs	Gerry Wall
Māori Affairs	Māori affairs	Koro Wētere
Petitions
Petitions	Public submissions	
Petitions	Public submissions	Bill Birch
Petitions	Public submissions	Kerry Burke
Petitions	Public submissions	Gordon Christie
Petitions	Public submissions	Ken Comber
Petitions	Public submissions	Bill Fraser
Petitions	Public submissions	Richard Mayson
Petitions	Public submissions	Bert Walker
Privileges
Privileges	Parliamentary privilege	
Privileges	Parliamentary privilege	**Martyn Finlay**
Privileges	Parliamentary privilege	Norman Kirk
Privileges	Parliamentary privilege	Jack Marshall
Privileges	Parliamentary privilege	Robert Muldoon
Privileges	Parliamentary privilege	Hugh Watt
Public expenditure
Public expenditure	Finance, revenue, taxation, audit	
Public expenditure	Finance, revenue, taxation, audit	Roger Drayton
Public expenditure	Finance, revenue, taxation, audit	George Gair
Public expenditure	Finance, revenue, taxation, audit	Frank Gill
Public expenditure	Finance, revenue, taxation, audit	Peter Gordon
Public expenditure	Finance, revenue, taxation, audit	Jonathan Hunt
Public expenditure	Finance, revenue, taxation, audit	Brian MacDonell
Public expenditure	Finance, revenue, taxation, audit	Robert Muldoon
Public expenditure	Finance, revenue, taxation, audit	Jack Ridley
Public expenditure	Finance, revenue, taxation, audit	**Bill Rowling**
Public expenditure	Finance, revenue, taxation, audit	Murray Smith
Road safety
Road safety		Percy Allen
Road safety		**Sir Basil Arthur**
Road safety		Ron Bailey
Road safety		Ron Barclay
Road safety		Douglas Carter
Road safety		Trevor Davey
Road safety		Les Gandar
Road safety		Peter Gordon
Road safety		Richard Mayson
Road safety		Ian Quigley
Selection
Selection		Ron Bailey
Selection		Norman Kirk
Selection		Jack Marshall
Selection		Robert Muldoon
Selection		Hugh Watt
Statutes Revision
Statutes Revision		Michael Bassett
Statutes Revision		**Martyn Finlay**
Statutes Revision		Eric Holland
Statutes Revision		Sir Roy Jack
Statutes Revision		J. B. Munro
Statutes Revision		Frank O'Flynn
Statutes Revision		Rufus Rogers
Statutes Revision		Rob Talbot
Statutes Revision		Peter Wilkinson
Statutes Revision		Trevor Young
Trade and Industry
Trade and Industry		Paddy Blanchfield
Trade and Industry		Ken Comber
Trade and Industry		Trevor Davey
Trade and Industry		**Warren Freer**
Trade and Industry		Brian MacDonell
Trade and Industry		Brian Talboys
Trade and Industry		Bill Young

== By-elections during 37th Parliament ==
There was one by-election held during the term of the 37th Parliament.

Electorate and by-election		Date	Incumbent	Cause	Winner
Sydenham	1974	2 November	Norman Kirk	Death	John Kirk
