= 1972 New Zealand general election =

General election in New Zealand

- 25 November 1972

87 seats in the Parliament 44 seats needed for a majority
- Turnout: 1,340,168 (88.94%)
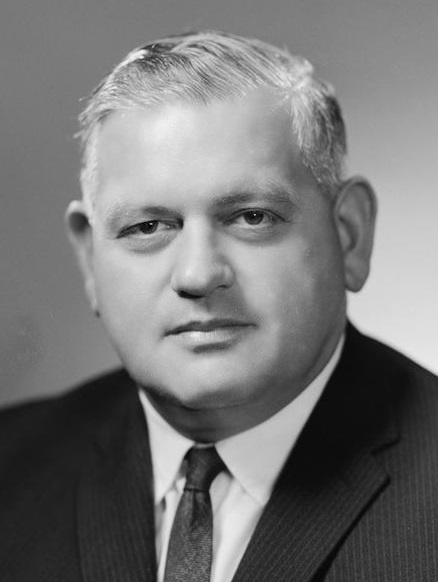

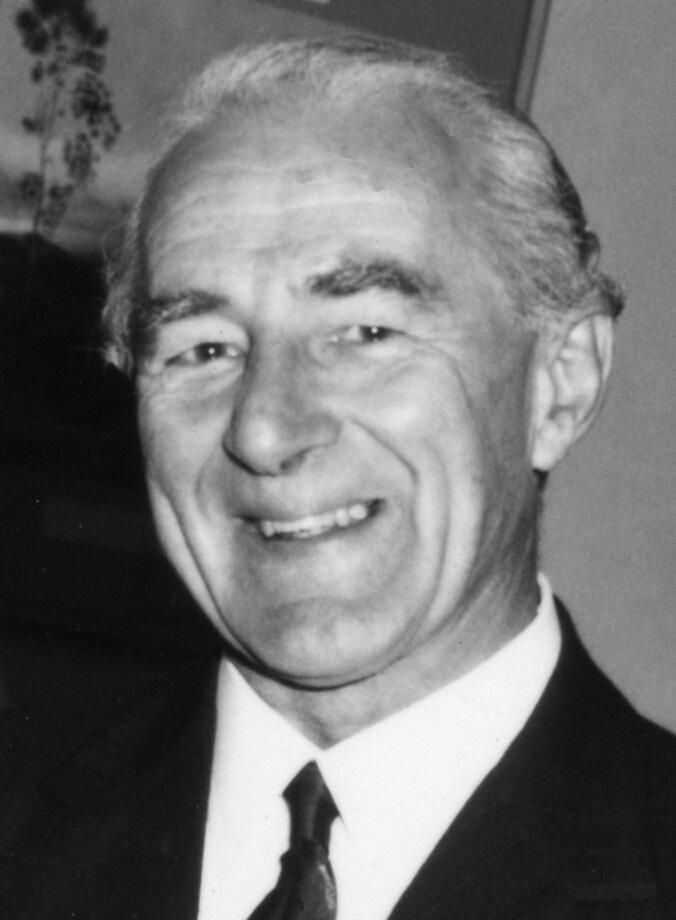
	First party	Second party
Leader	Norman Kirk	Jack Marshall
Party	Labour	National
Leader since	9 December 1965	7 February 1972
Leader's seat	Sydenham	Karori
Last election	39 seats, 44.2%	45 seats, 45.2%
Seats won	55	32
Seat change	▲16	▼13
Popular vote	677,669	581,422
Percentage	48.4%	41.5%
Swing	▲4.2%	▼3.7%
- Results by electorate, shaded by winning margin
Prime Minister before election
Jack Marshall
National
Subsequent Prime Minister
Norman Kirk
Labour

The 1972 New Zealand general election was held on 25 November to elect MPs to the 37th session of the New Zealand Parliament. The Labour Party, led by Norman Kirk, defeated the governing National Party.

== Background ==
The National Party had been in office since the 1960 election, when it had defeated the ruling Labour Party, led by Walter Nash. The Second Labour Government was the shortest-lasting of all New Zealand governments to that day; in contrast, the Second National Government, led for the majority of its tenure by Keith Holyoake, would be re-elected three times.

National's policies were focused around stability and a "steady as she goes" approach, but Holyoake's Government was increasingly perceived as tired and worn-out. Additionally, Holyoake had been in politics since the 1930s, and his staunch conservatism was a poor fit for an increasingly cosmopolitan society. For much of the government's third term, there had been speculation as to when Holyoake would stand down. Finally, in February 1972, Holyoake stood aside and was replaced by his deputy, Jack Marshall, who took steps to reinvigorate the party.

Meanwhile, Norman Kirk had been at the helm of Labour since 1965. In this time, he had been modernising and updating the Labour Party, but narrowly lost the 1969 election. Kirk slimmed and dressed to improve his image, and visited several overseas Labour parties to broaden his knowledge. He activated a "spokesman" or shadow cabinet system to spread the responsibility, but it was difficult to avoid one composed largely of MPs from the Auckland and Christchurch areas. Despite the improvements, commentators speculated whether National would pull off another cliffhanger victory. Economic recession and voter fatigue had hurt National at the polls. Labour's slogan was "It's Time – Time for a change, time for Labour", which expertly captured the national mood.

A deciding election issue was the proposed raising of the levels of lakes Manapouri and Te Anau as part of the construction of the Manapouri Power Station to supply the aluminium smelter in Bluff with electricity. National wanted to proceed with the work but Labour pledged to keep the lake levels as they were. It became a deciding issue, with four National incumbents from Otago and Southland losing their electorates (Awarua, Invercargill, Otago Central, and Oamaru).

=== MPs retiring in 1972 ===
Nine National MPs and one Labour MP intended to retire at the end of the 36th Parliament.

Party	Name	Electorate
National	John Rae	Eden
National	Alfred E. Allen	Franklin
National	Leslie Munro	Hamilton West
National	Don McKay	Marsden
National	Norman Shelton	Rangitīkei
National	Rona Stevenson	Taupo
National	George Walsh	Tauranga
National	David Seath	Waitomo
National	Dan Riddiford	Wellington Central
Labour	John Mathison	Avon

=== 1972 electoral redistribution ===
Since the 1969 election, the number of electorates in the South Island was fixed at 25, with continued faster population growth in the North Island leading to an increase in the number of general electorates. Including the four Māori electorates, there had been 80 electorates since the 1902 election. This increased to 84 electorates through the 1969 election. The 1972 electoral redistribution saw three additional general seats created for the North Island, bringing the total number of electorates to 87.

Together with increased urbanisation in Christchurch and Nelson, the changes proved very disruptive to existing electorates. Only two South Island electorates were not altered by the redistribution (Clutha and Lyttelton). Only eight of the North Island electorates were not altered (Franklin, Gisborne, Hobson, Island Bay, Miramar, North Shore, Tamaki, and Wairarapa).

In the South Island, three electorates were abolished (Buller, Westland, and Selwyn), and three electorates were newly created (Rakaia, Tasman, and West Coast). In the North Island, five electorates were abolished (Hauraki, Marsden, Otaki, Waimarino, and Waitomo), two electorates were recreated (Coromandel and Otahuhu), and six electorates were newly created (East Coast Bays, Hamilton East, Kapiti, King Country, Ruahine, and Whangarei).

== Election day ==
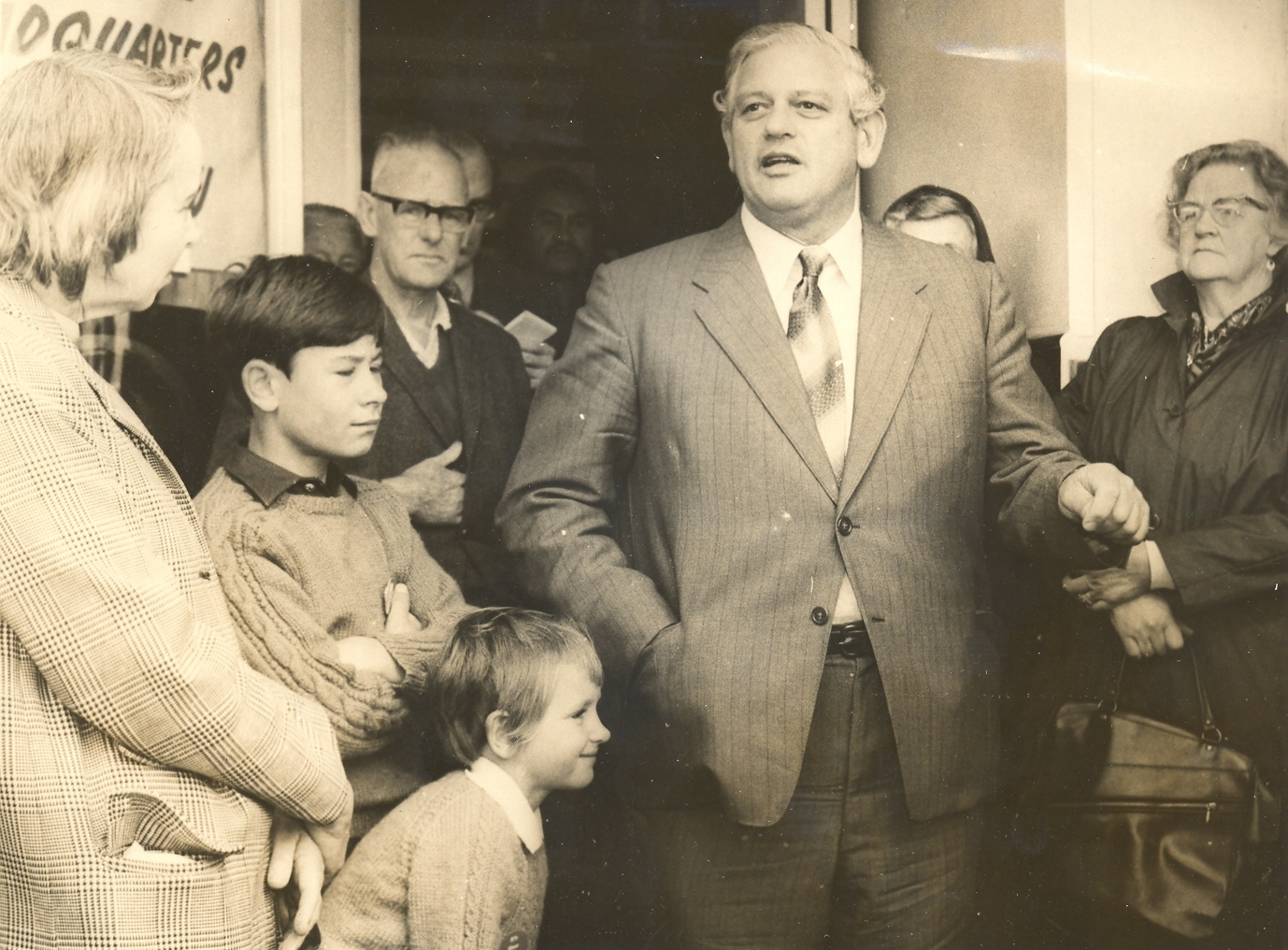
Kirk campaigning in Levin

The date for the 1972 elections was 25 November, a Saturday. 1,583,256 people were registered to vote. There was a turnout of 89.1%, slightly higher than the previous election and considerably higher than the following one. The number of electorates being contested was 87.

== Results ==
The election saw the Labour Party defeat the governing National Party in a landslide, winning 55 seats to National's 32. This represented the largest swing against a sitting government since Labour first won power in 1935. Labour was therefore able to form its first government since 1960, with Norman Kirk becoming Prime Minister. The second National government thus gave way to the third Labour government. No minor parties managed to gain seats, and no independents were elected. There were 1,583,256 electors on the roll, with 1,401,152 (88.50%) voting.

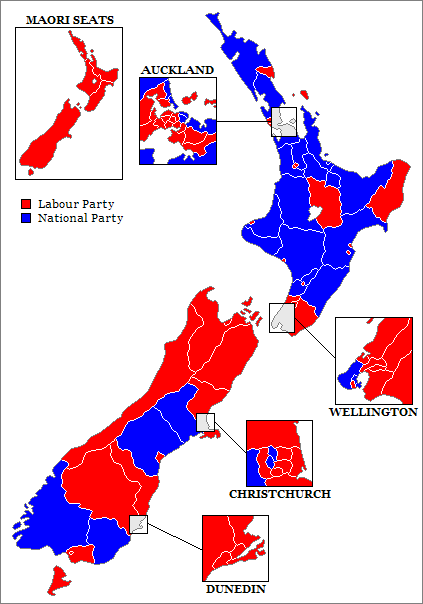
Map of electorates.

Party	Candidates	Total votes	Percentage	Seats won	Change
Labour	87	677,669	48.37	55	+16
National	87	581,422	41.50	32	-13
Social Credit	87	93,231	6.65	-	±0
Values	42	27,467	1.96	-	±0
New Democratic	86	8,783	0.63	-	±0
Liberal Reform	24	4,077	0.29	-	±0
Socialist Unity	5	444	0.03	-	±0
National Socialist	1	35	0.00	-	±0
Independent	43	8,503	0.61	-	±0
Total	456	1,401,152		87	+3

=== Votes summary ===
Popular Vote
Labour	48.37%
National	41.50%
Social Credit	6.65%
Values	1.96%
New Democratic	0.63%
Liberal Reform	0.29%
Independents	0.61%

Parliament seats
Labour	63.22%
National	36.78%

The table below shows the results of the 1972 general election:

Key

National Labour Social Credit Independent

Electorate results for the 1972 New Zealand general election
Electorate	Incumbent	Winner	Majority	Runner up
General electorates
Auckland Central	Norman Douglas		2,009	Clive Edwards
Avon	John Mathison	Mary Batchelor	6,055	Gordon Thomas
Awarua	Hugh Templeton	Aubrey Begg	723	Hugh Templeton
Bay of Plenty	Percy Allen		2,189	Graham Mead
Birkenhead	Norman King		1,533	Don McKinnon
Christchurch Central	Bruce Barclay		5,103	Barbara Beaven
Clutha	Peter Gordon		2,131	Les McKay
Coromandel	New electorate	Leo Schultz	2,181	Alyson Murphy
Dunedin Central	Brian MacDonell		3,771	Fred O'Neill
Dunedin North	Ethel McMillan		4,020	John Wallis
East Coast Bays	New electorate	Frank Gill	979	Brian Pauling
Eden	John Rae	Mike Moore	788	Mary Kidd
Egmont	Venn Young		2,928	Robert Logan Peck
Franklin	Alfred E. Allen	Bill Birch	4,188	Geoff Braybrooke
Gisborne	Esme Tombleson	Trevor Davey	488	Esme Tombleson
Grey Lynn	Eddie Isbey		5,487	Jens Meder
Hamilton East	New electorate	Rufus Rogers	397	Ross Jansen
Hamilton West	Leslie Munro	Dorothy Jelicich	544	Derek Heather
Hastings	Duncan MacIntyre	Richard Mayson	1,148	Duncan MacIntyre
Hawkes Bay	Richard Harrison		600	David Butcher
Henderson	Martyn Finlay		4,221	Ross C. MacFarlane
Heretaunga	Ron Bailey		2,964	John Schnellenberg
Hobson	Logan Sloane		1,148	Howard Manning
Hutt	Trevor Young		3,397	Michael Fowler
Invercargill	John Chewings	J. B. Munro	765	John Chewings
Island Bay	Gerald O'Brien		3,495	Bruce Farland
Kapiti	New electorate	Frank O'Flynn	706	Barry Brill
Karori	Jack Marshall		4,408	Adam Floyd
King Country	New electorate	Jim Bolger	1,240	Bruce Sakey
Lyttelton	Tom McGuigan		3,235	John Blumsky
Manawatu	Les Gandar	Allan McCready	427	Mervyn Hancock
Mangere	Colin Moyle		3,939	Stanley Lawson
Manukau	Roger Douglas		2,844	R O Price
Manurewa	Phil Amos		2,397	Pat Baker
Marlborough	Ian Brooks		1,290	Bruno Dalliessi
Miramar	Bill Young		434	Brian Edwards
Mt Albert	Warren Freer		3,980	John Malcolm
Napier	Gordon Christie		3,725	Merle Bell
Nelson	Stan Whitehead		1,933	Ian McWhannell
New Lynn	Jonathan Hunt		4,312	Gordon McDermott
New Plymouth	Ron Barclay		1,296	Terry Boon
North Shore	George Gair		2,821	Colin Chiles
Oamaru	Allan Dick	Bill Laney	390	Allan Dick
Onehunga	Hugh Watt		4,835	Peter Blakeborough
Otago Central	Murray Rose	Ian Quigley	1,483	Murray Rose
Otahuhu	New electorate	Bob Tizard	6,403	D C Brooker
Pahiatua	Keith Holyoake		4,359	L J Cairns
Pakuranga	Bob Tizard	Gavin Downie	1,802	J B Irwin
Palmerston North	Joe Walding		1,766	Paul William Mitchell
Papanui	Bert Walker		1,734	Mollie Clark
Petone	Fraser Colman		5,340	Nick Ursin
Piako	Jack Luxton		4,472	I L Howell
Porirua	Gerry Wall		4,399	Ross Doughty
Raglan	Douglas Carter		1,350	Allan John Smith
Rakaia	New electorate	Colin McLachlan	2,133	Alex Clark
Rangiora	Lorrie Pickering	Kerry Burke	866	Adrian Hiatt
Rangitikei	Norman Shelton	Roy Jack	3,037	N R Pearce (Note: Bruce Beetham came third for Social Credit in Rangitikei)
Remuera	Allan Highet		6,118	Rex Stanton
Riccarton	Eric Holland		2,164	David Jackson
Rodney	Peter Wilkinson		4,507	Peter Trim
Roskill	Arthur Faulkner		4,439	John Priestley
Rotorua	Harry Lapwood		786	N F Pachoud
Ruahine	New electorate	Les Gandar	552	Sam Mihaere
St Albans	Roger Drayton		3,066	Ron Doak
St Kilda	Bill Fraser		5,615	Charles Kirby
South Canterbury	Rob Talbot		2,035	David Braithwaite
Stratford	David Thomson		3,068	D G Turney
Sydenham	Norman Kirk		6,986	John Burn
Tamaki	Robert Muldoon		4,590	Alan Hedger
Tasman	New electorate	Bill Rowling	1,834	Gerald Hunt
Taupo	Rona Stevenson	Jack Ridley	783	Jim Higgins
Tauranga	George Walsh	Keith Allen	2,215	Henry Uttinger
Timaru	Sir Basil Arthur		3,954	Dave Walker
Waikato	Lance Adams-Schneider		4,208	Bob Reese
Wairarapa	Jack Williams		1,086	Ben Couch
Waitemata	Frank Gill	Michael Bassett	2,544	Ray La Varis
Wallace	Brian Talboys		2,904	Ian Lamont
Wanganui	Bill Tolhurst	Russell Marshall	2,879	Bill Tolhurst
Wellington Central	Dan Riddiford	Ken Comber	27	David Shand (Note: Shand was first on election night, but lost when special votes were included)
West Coast	New electorate	Paddy Blanchfield	4,242	Barry Dallas
Western Hutt	Henry May		2,392	Julian Watts (Note: Julian Watts was a son of Jack Watts)
Whangarei	New electorate	Murray Smith	1,180	Lawrence Carr
Wigram	Mick Connelly		5,255	David Cox
Māori electorates
Eastern Maori	Paraone Reweti		6,190	Koro Dewes
Northern Maori	Matiu Rata		5,260	Graham Latimer
Southern Maori	Whetu Tirikatene-Sullivan		8,251	Kate Parahi
Western Maori	Koro Wētere		8,686	R Te A H Rawiri

Table footnotes:
