= Ian Shearer =

New Zealand politician (1941–2021)

The Honourable Ian Shearer

5th Minister for the Environment
- In office 12 February 1981 – 26 July 1984
- Prime Minister: Robert Muldoon
- Preceded by: Venn Young
- Succeeded by: Russell Marshall

16th Minister of Science and Technology
- In office 12 February 1981 – 26 July 1984
- Prime Minister: Robert Muldoon
- Preceded by: Bill Birch
- Succeeded by: Bob Tizard

15th Minister of Broadcasting
- In office 11 December 1981 – 26 July 1984
- Prime Minister: Robert Muldoon
- Preceded by: Warren Cooper
- Succeeded by: Jonathan Hunt

Member of the New Zealand Parliament for Hamilton East
- In office 1975–1984
- Preceded by: Rufus Rogers
- Succeeded by: Bill Dillon

Personal details
- Born: Ian John Shearer; 10 December 1941 Whakatāne, New Zealand
- Died: 1 June 2021 (aged 79) Whakatāne, New Zealand
- Party: National; New Zealand First

Ian John Shearer (10 December 1941 – 1 June 2021) was a New Zealand politician of the National Party, environmentalist and research scientist.

== Early life and education ==
Shearer was born at Whakatāne in 1941, the son of Jack Sewell Shearer. He received his education from Whakatane Primary and Whakatane High School. He completed bachelor's and master's degrees at Massey University in agricultural science and a PhD in reproductive physiology at the University of Nottingham.

== Career ==
Shearer spent nine years as an animal scientist at the Ruakura Research Centre before becoming a member of parliament in 1975.

New Zealand Parliament
| Years | Term | Electorate | Party |
|---|---|---|---|
| 1975–1978 | 38th | Hamilton East | National |
| 1978–1981 | 39th | Hamilton East | National |
| 1981–1984 | 40th | Hamilton East | National |

He represented the Hamilton East electorate in Parliament from 1975 to 1984, when he was defeated by Bill Dillon. Under Robert Muldoon, he was Minister for the Environment, Minister of Science and Technology, and Minister of Broadcasting.

In 1985, Shearer publicly questioned the National Party on membership and finances, which resulted in the suspension of his membership in October of that year. Although the suspension was lifted, Shearer resigned all his party roles in December 1985. He later joined the New Zealand First Party which was largely made up of National Party dissidents and stood as the New Zealand First candidate in the Onehunga electorate at the 1993 general election, losing to Labour's Richard Northey.

After leaving politics Shearer was the dean of science and engineering at the Auckland University of Technology for nine years and served on the Waitangi Tribunal. He retired from public service in 2005.

He published his autobiography The Boy from the Bay in 2006.

== Personal life ==
Shearer was married twice, firstly to Sandra May Griffiths, the daughter of Ivor David Griffiths on 5 December 1964, and secondly to Cheryl. He and Sandra had one son and one daughter.

Shearer died from idiopathic pulmonary fibrosis at his home in Whakatāne on 1 June 2021.

== Publications ==
- The Boy from the Bay: an autobiography (2006)
- Whakatāne Hospital, Te Whatumauri Hauora : a history (2011)
- Ōwhakatoro : Sisam & Sons : from Clydesdales to computers (2013) – with Barrie Macdonald
- A century on Cameron Road : a history of Tauranga Hospital, 1914–2014 (2016) – with Dr Rex E Wright-St Clair
- Family – the Shearers of Ōkaiawa : the history of a pioneer family (2018)
- The adventures of Slim Jim (2020)
- Antarctica twice, and related issues (2020)

== Notes ==
New Zealand Parliament
| Preceded by Rufus Rogers | Member of Parliament for Hamilton East; 1975–1984 | Succeeded by Bill Dillon |
Political offices
| Preceded by Venn Young | Minister for the Environment; 1981–1984 | Succeeded by Russell Marshall |
| Preceded by Bill Birch | Minister of Science and Technology; 1981–1984 | Succeeded by Bob Tizard |
| Preceded by Warren Cooper | Minister of Broadcasting; 1981–1984 | Succeeded by Jonathan Hunt |
