= 1965 New Zealand Labour Party leadership election =

New Zealand party leadership election

- 9 December 1965
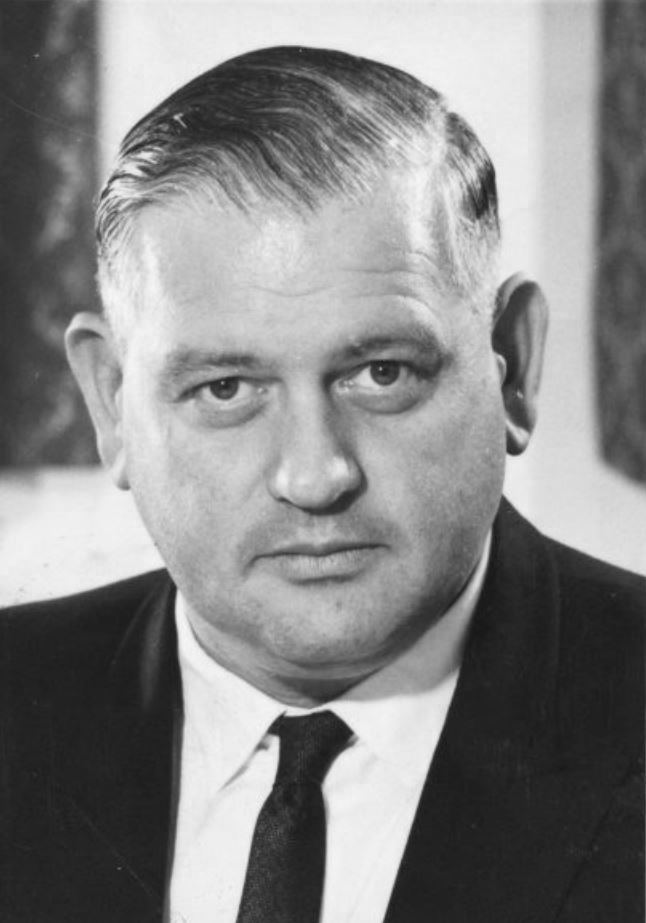

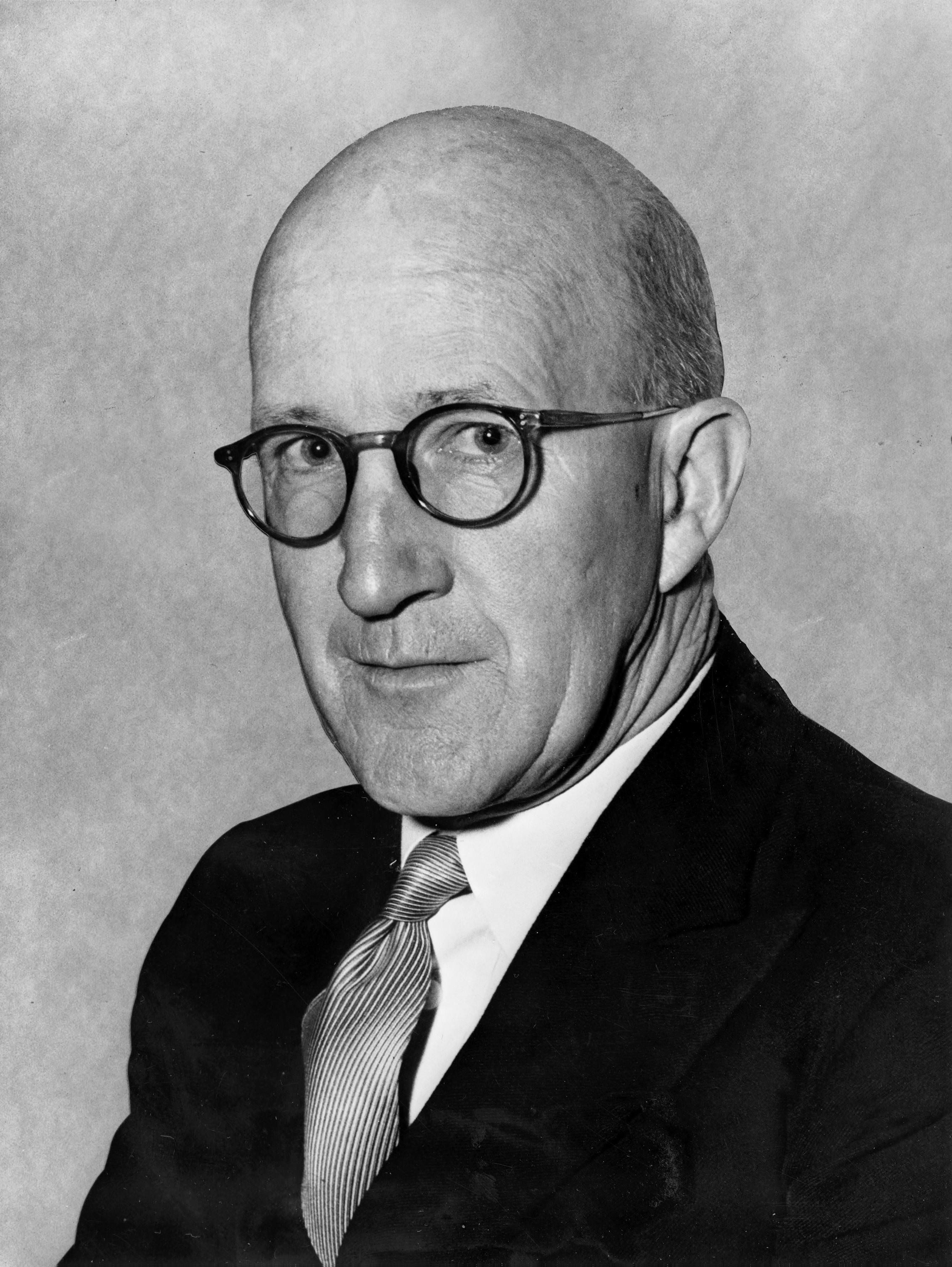
Candidate	Norman Kirk	Arnold Nordmeyer
Popular vote	25	10
Percentage	71.42%	28.58%
Leader before election
Arnold Nordmeyer
Leader after election
Norman Kirk

The 1965 New Zealand Labour Party leadership election was held on 9 December 1965 to determine the future leadership of the New Zealand Labour Party. The election was won by Lyttelton MP Norman Kirk.

== Background ==
After Walter Nash retired as leader in 1963 Arnold Nordmeyer became Labour's sixth leader despite holding considerable public blame for Labour's loss of support after the Black Budget of 1958. The memory of the "Black Budget" still plagued Nordmeyer's profile and many within the party believed that it was time for a fresh start. Many MPs in Labour felt Nordmeyer was unelectable as his previous performance as Minister of Finance represented a 'tax and hope' image which the party was keen to rectify. In early 1964 Kirk spoke to Nordmeyer to see if he intended to continue as party leader. Nordmeyer stated he did and was confident he would win the 1966 election and would appoint Kirk Minister of Industries and Commerce in the event of a Labour victory. Kirk thought this hypothetical posting to be insufficient and set his sights on the leadership, despite (according to Nordmeyer) promising he would not. Some colleagues such as Henry May thought it best for Kirk to wait until after the 1966 election, believing Labour would lose regardless of who was leader. Kirk ignored such advice and, as party president, strategically allowed full television coverage of the party's 1965 annual conference. It was the first occasion a political conference was televised and Kirk took full advantage and presented himself well on camera and made impressive speeches including deliberately straying in his 'state of the party' address to speak on foreign affairs and declare reasons why New Zealand should avoid participating in the Vietnam War.

A group of younger Labour MPs formed a group who became dedicated to replace Nordmeyer with Kirk, becoming known as the "Mafia". The main supporters of Kirk were Bill Fox, Warren Freer and Mick Moohan who promoted him to others at gatherings. Moohan attempted to win over the President of the New Zealand Federation of Labour Tom Skinner, who was unconvinced. Skinner respected rather than liked Nordmeyer but thought a challenge being the end of his leadership was less dignified than he deserved and refused to help Kirk. Freer, who supported Kirk but also felt affinity for Nordmeyer, asked his friend Phil Holloway (a Labour MP from 1954 to 1960) to inform Nordmeyer of Kirk's level of support. Freer hoped that if Nordmeyer was aware of the numbers he would not contest the leadership and save himself embarrassment. At a dinner with the Nordmeyers, Holloway informed them of the state of caucus loyalties. Nordmeyer was shocked to hear of Kirk's support but his wife, Frances, was cynical of the news and dismissed the information and assured that her husband had the numbers to win.

By mid-1965 media were openly speculating a challenge for the leadership by Kirk. In October Nordmeyer stated that a caucus meeting would be held in the second week of December to "provide an opportunity for discussing and voting on the leadership and deputy leadership" of the party.

== Candidates ==
=== Arnold Nordmeyer ===
Nordmeyer had led Labour since Nash's retirement nearly three years earlier. He led them in the 1963 election where Labour's vote increased slightly, but still did not perform well enough to win office. Some within Labour's caucus were of the opinion that Nordmeyer was too distant and out of touch with his colleagues and vice versa. Nordmeyer was credited for holding Labour factions together under his leadership with a closer liaison between the Labour movement's political and industrial wings, but the election loss and memory of the 1958 Budget counted against him.

=== Norman Kirk ===
Kirk first entered parliament in 1957. Gradually, he began to rise through Labour's internal hierarchy, becoming vice-president of the Party in 1963 and president in 1964. As president Kirk made a point of visiting the Labour Representation Committee in every electorate in the country and was apparently received very well. Other MPs often saw Kirk as a champion for ordinary New Zealanders via his working-class background at a time when ordinary voters saw many other politicians, such as Nordmeyer, out-of-touch and aloof. Kirk was seen as lacking in administrative experience as he was a backbencher in the previous Labour government and had not been a cabinet minister.

== Result ==
A caucus vote was held on 9 December 1965 where Nordmeyer was defeated by Kirk 25 votes to 10. Nordmeyer's deputy leader, Hugh Watt, retained his position despite the change in leadership receiving 24 votes against a combined total of 10 votes for the other two nominees.

=== Leadership ballot ===
Candidate	Votes	%
Norman Kirk	25	71.42
Arnold Nordmeyer	10	28.58
Majority	15	42.85
Turnout	35	—N/a

=== Deputy-leadership ballot ===
Candidate	Votes	%
Hugh Watt	24	70.58
Arthur Faulkner	8	23.52
Norman Douglas	2	5.88
Majority	16	47.05
Turnout	34	—N/a

== How each MP voted ==
A list of each MP's vote.

MP	Leader Vote
Phil Amos	Kirk
Basil Arthur	Kirk
Ron Bailey	Kirk
Paddy Blanchfield	Kirk
Mick Connelly	Nordmeyer
Norman Douglas	Kirk
Jim Edwards	Nordmeyer
Arthur Faulkner	Kirk
Bill Fraser	Kirk
Warren Freer	Kirk
Martyn Finlay	Kirk
Bill Fox	Kirk
Mabel Howard	Kirk
Norman King	Kirk
Norman Kirk	Kirk
Ethel McMillan	Nordmeyer
Brian MacDonell	Kirk
Ritchie Macdonald	Kirk
Robert Macfarlane	Nordmeyer
Rex Mason	Nordmeyer
Jock Mathison	Nordmeyer
Henry May	Nordmeyer
Mick Moohan	Kirk
Colin Moyle	Kirk
Walter Nash	Kirk
Arnold Nordmeyer	Nordmeyer
Bill Rowling	Nordmeyer
Matiu Rata	Kirk
Iriaka Ratana	Kirk
George Spooner	Kirk
Eruera Tirikatene	Kirk
Bob Tizard	Kirk
Steve Watene	Kirk
Hugh Watt	Kirk
Stan Whitehead	Nordmeyer

== Aftermath ==
Kirk's new enthusiastic leadership brought about a gradual rejuvenation in Labour's popularity. He suffered narrow election losses in 1966 and 1969 elections before finally winning office and becoming Prime Minister in 1972 election. Nordmeyer remained in Parliament for another four years, moving to the backbenches and becoming an elder statesman of the party. He retired at the 1969 election.
