= Roger Drayton =

New Zealand politician

Roger Drayton JP

Member of the New Zealand Parliament for St Albans
- In office 29 November 1969 – 25 November 1978
- Preceded by: Bert Walker
- Succeeded by: David Caygill

Personal details
- Born: 4 January 1925 Templeton, New Zealand
- Died: 21 June 1986 (aged 61) Paraparaumu, New Zealand
- Party: Labour
- Spouse: Betty Noeline Drayton
- Children: Two

Military service
- Branch/service: Royal New Zealand Air Force
- Years of service: 1944–69
- Rank: Squadron leader
- Battles/wars: World War II

Roger Patrick Blundell Drayton JP (4 January 1925 – 21 June 1986) was a New Zealand politician of the Labour Party.

== Biography ==
=== Early life and career ===
Drayton was born in Templeton. He attended schools at Sockburn and Hornby before finishing his education at Christchurch Boys' High School.

Drayton trained at Wigram after enlisting in the Royal New Zealand Air Force (RNZAF) in 1944, serving until 1969, by which time he had risen to the rank of Squadron leader. He served in the administrative section of the RNZAF and served abroad in Australia, Fiji and Singapore. Following World War II he was employed as a computer systems analyst for the Ministry of Defence.

He was a keen sportsman and represented the RNZAF services teams in both cricket and soccer. He was the secretary of the Combined Services Sports Council in 1959. In 1955, he became secretary of the Ellesmere Cricket Association.

=== Political career ===
New Zealand Parliament
Years	Term	Electorate	Party
1969–1972	36th	St Albans	Labour
1972–1975	37th	St Albans	Labour
1975–1978	38th	St Albans	Labour

He represented the St Albans electorate from 1969 to 1978, when he retired. Drayton had a well—earned reputation as one of the best campaigners in the Labour Party after winning a previously thought marginal seat by over 900 votes and increasing his majority after that. Consequently, he was often sought out for advice from candidates and backbench colleagues. Drayton, according to Auckland MP Warren Freer, would never let anyone forget that he was from and represented Christchurch.

After the formation of the Third Labour Government he stood for a seat in the cabinet. He was not elected, which Prime Minister Norman Kirk regretted. He then put himself forward for the positions of Chairman of Committees and junior government whip, but was unsuccessful. In 1973, he stood unsuccessfully for the Labour Party vice-presidency, but was beaten by Grey Lynn MP Eddie Isbey. When Labour was unexpectedly defeated, Drayton retained his seat and in January 1976, he was appointed by Labour leader Bill Rowling as Shadow Minister of State Services. From 1977 to 1978 he was Shadow Minister of Defence. He became Labour's caucus secretary and later was Chief Opposition Whip between 1976 and 1978.

At the 1979 Labour Party conference Drayton was a candidate for the vice-presidency of the party. He polled well behind the winning candidate, Stu McCaffley, the secretary of the Drivers' Federation. Ahead of the 1981 election he was tasked by the Labour caucus with writing a series of reports on Labour's chances of winning the election. His fourth report was controversial as it contained many criticisms of the party and some of its more liberal policy stances, particularly abortion. He also made the decision to release it publicly which angered Rowling and other MPs. Drayton was an opponent of abortion and a long time member of the Society for the Protection of the Unborn Child which was thought to be a motivating factor in the report, although he denied this.

=== Later life and death ===
Drayton died at his home in Paraparaumu after a long illness aged 61, survived by his wife, son and daughter.

== Notes ==
New Zealand Parliament
Preceded by Bert Walker	Member of Parliament for St Albans; 1969–1978	Succeeded by David Caygill
Party political offices
Preceded by Ron Barclay	Senior Whip of the Labour Party; 1976–1978	Succeeded by Russell Marshall
Political offices
Preceded by Bill Fraser	Shadow Minister of Defence; 1977–1978	Succeeded by Mick Connelly
