= It's Time (New Zealand campaign) =

1972 New Zealand political campaign

Campaign billboard.

It's Time was a successful political campaign run by the New Zealand Labour Party under Norman Kirk at the 1972 general election. The Labour Party promoted its initiatives with advertisements featuring the lines "It's time for a change, it's time for Labour." The campaign was ultimately successful and marked the first time Labour was in government since losing the 1960 election to the National Party.

== History ==
The catchphrase "It's Time" was first conceived by campaign organiser Bob Harvey. With an accompanying song for television adverts, Kirk was relatively sceptical of the phrase initially. However, Kirk warmed to the idea upon recalling his lack of enthusiasm for Labour's 1969 campaign advert "Make Things Happen", which performed better than expected.

The "It's Time" campaign was used for television, radio, newspapers and billboards. It promoted on a growing need for political and economic change after 12 years of National Party government. In an economic recession and rising unemployment, National was lagging in polls. Labour's accompanying slogan was "Time For A Change, Time For Labour", expertly captured the nation's mood. Claire Robinson, a Professor of Communications Design at Massey University, stated it was New Zealand's best election slogan "It had so many meanings – it's time for Labour, it's time for Norman Kirk, it's time for a change ... It was really good, and it was actually one of the best campaigns [too]. Mind you, we'd [New Zealand] had four terms of a National Government by then, so it was definitely time for a change."

Later, the Australian Labor Party successfully ran a similar "It's Time" campaign in that year's Australian federal election.
