= Chairman of Committees (New Zealand House of Representatives) =

The Chairman of Committees was an elected position of the New Zealand House of Representatives. The role existed between 1854 and 1992. The roles of the Chairman of Committees were to deputise for the Speaker, and to chair the House when it was in committee. The role is now carried out by the Deputy Speaker. The role of Chairman of Committees also existed for the Legislative Council.

== Establishment ==
The position was established during the first session of the 1st New Zealand Parliament. Parliament first convened on 24 May 1854, and on 21 June of that year, Auckland lawyer Frederick Merriman was elected as its first Chairman of Committees. The role also existed for the Legislative Council, was established in 1865 and first held by Mathew Richmond.

== Role ==
The chief role of the Chairman of Committees was to chair the House when it was in committee (i.e., considering a bill at committee stage) or preside in the absence of the Speaker or when the Speaker so requested. These arrangements were based on those of the House of Commons of the United Kingdom.

The Chairman of Committees ceased to hold office on the dissolution of Parliament, but was remunerated until the next Parliament first met, when it then had a chance to elect a new chairman.

Until 1992, the Chairman of Committees was known as the Deputy Speaker only when presiding over the House. That year, the position of Deputy Speaker was made official under the Standing Orders, and the role of Chairman of Committees was discontinued. The first Deputy Speaker was appointed on 10 November 1992.

== Office holders ==
The following is a list of Chairmen of Committees of the House of Representatives:

Key

Independent Liberal Reform United Labour National

No.	Name	Portrait	Term start and end dates		Parliament
1	Frederick Merriman		21 June 1854	15 September 1855	1st
2	Hugh Carleton		17 April 1856	5 November 1860	2nd
2	Hugh Carleton		11 June 1861	27 January 1866	3rd
2	Hugh Carleton		4 July 1866	30 December 1870	4th
3	Maurice O'Rorke^{1}		16 August 1871	23 October 1872	5th
4	Arthur Seymour		16 July 1873	14 May 1875	5th
(3)	Maurice O'Rorke		21 July 1875	6 December 1875	5th
(3)	Maurice O'Rorke		28 June 1876	11 July 1879	6th
(4)	Arthur Seymour		16 July 1879	15 August 1879	6th
(4)	Arthur Seymour		26 September 1879	8 November 1881	7th
5	Ebenezer Hamlin		30 May 1882	27 June 1884	8th
5	Ebenezer Hamlin		5 September 1884	15 July 1887	9th
5	Ebenezer Hamlin		13 October 1887	3 October 1890	10th
6	Westby Perceval		23 June 1891	15 September 1891	11th
7	William Lee Rees		18 September 1891	11 July 1893	11th
8	Arthur Guinness^{1}		13 July 1893	8 November 1893	11th
8	Arthur Guinness^{1}		10 July 1894	14 November 1896	12th
8	Arthur Guinness^{1}		9 April 1897	15 November 1899	13th
8	Arthur Guinness^{1}		3 July 1900	5 November 1902	14th
9	John A. Millar		2 July 1903	15 November 1905	15th
10	Roderick McKenzie		31 August 1906	29 October 1908	16th
11	Thomas Wilford		12 June 1909	8 July 1910	17th
12	James Colvin		23 August 1910	20 November 1911	17th
13	Frederic Lang^{1}		2 August 1912	26 June 1913	18th
14	Alexander Malcolm		4 July 1913	20 November 1914	18th
14	Alexander Malcolm		7 July 1915	27 November 1919	19th
14	Alexander Malcolm		15 July 1920	30 November 1922	20th
15	Alexander Young		24 July 1923	14 October 1925	21st
16	Frank Hockly		2 July 1926	18 October 1928	22nd
17	Sydney George Smith		11 December 1928	28 May 1930	23rd
18	William Bodkin		27 June 1930	27 October 1931	23rd
(17)	Sydney George Smith		27 October 1931	12 November 1931	23rd
(17)	Sydney George Smith		26 February 1932	12 February 1935	24th
19	Jimmy Nash		13 February 1935	1 November 1935	24th
20	Ted Howard		1 April 1936	20 September 1938	25th
21	Robert McKeen^{1}		29 June 1939	30 August 1943	26th
21	Robert McKeen^{1}		1 March 1944	4 November 1946	27th
22	Clyde Carr		24 June 1947	3 November 1949	28th
23	Cyril Harker		29 June 1950	27 July 1951	29th
23	Cyril Harker		28 September 1951	5 October 1954	30th
23	Cyril Harker		30 March 1955	29 October 1957	31st
24	Reginald Keeling		22 January 1958	31 October 1960	32nd
25	Roy Jack^{1}		23 June 1961	29 October 1963	33rd
25	Roy Jack^{1}		12 June 1964	25 October 1966	34th
26	Jack George		28 April 1967	28 October 1969	35th
27	Alfred E. Allen^{1}		13 March 1970	7 June 1972	36th
28	Richard Harrison^{1}		8 June 1972	26 October 1972	36th
29	Ron Bailey		16 February 1973	10 September 1974	37th
30	Jonathan Hunt^{1}		17 September 1974	30 October 1975	37th
(28)	Richard Harrison^{1}		24 June 1976	9 May 1978	38th
31	Jack Luxton		12 May 1978	26 October 1978	38th
31	Jack Luxton		18 May 1979	29 October 1981	39th
31	Jack Luxton		8 April 1982	15 June 1984	40th
32	John Terris		17 August 1984	29 July 1987	41st
32	John Terris		17 September 1987	10 September 1990	42nd
33	Jim Gerard		29 November 1990	10 November 1992	43rd

^{1} Also served as Speaker

== Deputy Chairman of Committees ==
The position of Deputy Chairman of Committees was created in 1975. After the role of chairman was replaced by that of Deputy Speaker in 1992, the third presiding officer of the House continued to be known as the deputy chairman for several more years, until the final holder of the office, Peter Hilt, became the first MP to be appointed Assistant Speaker on 21 February 1996.

Key

National Labour United NZ

List of Deputy Chairmen of Committees
No.	Name	Term start and end dates		Parliament
1	Ron Barclay	26 March 1975	30 October 1975	37th
2	Bill Birch	24 June 1976	26 October 1978	38th
3	Tony Friedlander	13 June 1979	29 October 1981	39th
4	Dail Jones	8 April 1982	15 June 1984	40th
5	Trevor Young	17 August 1984	29 July 1987	41st
5	Trevor Young	17 September 1987	10 September 1990	42nd
6	Robert Anderson	29 November 1990	23 September 1993	43rd
7	Joy McLauchlan	22 December 1993	27 February 1995	44th
8	Peter Hilt	1 March 1995	21 February 1996	44th
