= Rufus Rogers =

New Zealand medical practitioner and politician

Rufus Rogers QSO

Member of the New Zealand Parliament for Hamilton East
- In office 25 November 1972 – 30 October 1975
- Succeeded by: Ian Shearer

Personal details
- Born: Anthony Trevelyan Rogers; 12 July 1913 New Plymouth, New Zealand
- Died: 18 August 2009 (aged 96) Hamilton, New Zealand
- Party: Labour
- Spouse: Pru Romilly (m. 1945; died 1998)
- Relations: Denis Rogers (brother)
- Children: 4

Anthony Trevelyan "Rufus" Rogers QSO (12 July 1913 – 18 August 2009) was a New Zealand medical doctor and a politician of the Labour Party.

== Biography ==
Rogers was born in New Plymouth on 12 July 1913, the son of Eugene Trevelyan "Tim" Rogers and Gwendoline Rogers. The doctor who delivered him spotted some rust-coloured hairs on his head and wanted to call him a "haematite", but his mother insisted that if anything, he was to be called Rufus. That name always stuck. Rogers was educated at Whitiora School and Hamilton High School, as well as Nelson College from 1930 to 1931, and the University of Otago, where he completed MB ChB degrees in 1938.

Rogers served with the Royal Army Medical Corps from 1939 to 1946. On 27 January 1945, he married Prudence Cecilia Romilly at St Mary's Church, Newick, Sussex, England, and the couple went on to have four children. Returning to New Zealand, Rogers practised in Hamilton as a general practitioner from 1946.

In 1956, a local campaign began to have a university in Hamilton. The barrister and solicitor Douglas Seymour chaired the lobby group for the first five years, and was succeeded in that role by Rogers. In 1964, their work was done and the University of Waikato was officially opened by the governor-general, Sir Bernard Fergusson. Rogers' brother, Denis Rogers, was the university's first chancellor from 1964 to 1969.

New Zealand Parliament
| Years | Term | Electorate | Party |
|---|---|---|---|
| 1972–1975 | 37th | Hamilton East | Labour |

Rogers was asked by the Labour Party whether they could nominate him for the 1972 election in the new Hamilton East electorate. Not even a member of the party at the time, he thought he must have been mistaken for his brother, Denis Rogers, who had been mayor of Hamilton from 1959 to 1968. Rufus Rogers represented the Hamilton East electorate for one parliamentary term from 1972 to 1975, when he was defeated by National's Ian Shearer. According to Trevor Mallard, Rogers was "probably one of the last true socialists in Parliament".

In the 1987 New Year Honours, Rogers was appointed a Companion of the Queen's Service Order for public services.

Rogers' wife, Pru, died in 1998. Rufus Rogers died in Hamilton on 18 August 2009, and his ashes were buried in Hamilton East Cemetery.

New Zealand Parliament
| New constituency | Member of Parliament for Hamilton East; 1972–1975 | Succeeded by Ian Shearer |
