= Richard Harrison (New Zealand politician) =

New Zealand politician (1921–2003)

The Honourable Sir Richard Harrison ED
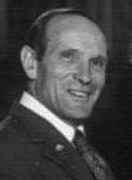

19th Speaker of the House of Representatives
- In office 10 May 1978 – 14 July 1984
- Prime Minister: Robert Muldoon
- Preceded by: Roy Jack
- Succeeded by: Basil Arthur

Member of the New Zealand Parliament for Hawkes Bay
- In office 30 November 1963 – 14 July 1984
- Preceded by: Cyril Harker
- Succeeded by: Bill Sutton

Personal details
- Born: John Richard Harrison; 23 May 1921 Hastings, New Zealand
- Died: 5 September 2003 (aged 82) Takapau, New Zealand
- Party: National
- Spouse: Margaret Kelly (m. 1948)
- Children: 4
- Education: University of Canterbury

Military service
- Allegiance: New Zealand
- Branch/service: New Zealand Army
- Years of service: 1943–1947; 1949–1959
- Rank: Lieutenant Colonel
- Unit: 23rd Battalion (1943–1945); Hawke's Bay Regiment (1949–1959)
- Commands: 1st Battalion, Hawke's Bay Regiment (1956–1959)
- Battles/wars: World War II; Italian campaign

Sir John Richard Harrison ED (23 May 1921 – 5 September 2003) was a New Zealand politician. After serving in a number of capacities in the National Party, he served as Speaker of the House of Representatives from 1978 to 1984.

== Early life ==
Harrison was born in Hastings, New Zealand, on 23 May 1921. He was educated at Wanganui Collegiate School and Canterbury University, from where he graduated with a Bachelor of Arts. During World War II, Harrison served in the army, and saw active service in Italy. He remained in the army for several years after the war. After leaving the military, he established himself as a farmer, although remained active as an army reservist. He served as commander of the reservist Hawke's Bay Regiment from 1956 to 1959. In 1953, Harrison was awarded the Queen Elizabeth II Coronation Medal.

In 1948, he married Margaret Kelly, the daughter of E. J. Kelly. They had three sons and one daughter.

== Political career ==
New Zealand Parliament
Years	Term	Electorate	Party
1963–1966	34th	Hawke's Bay	National
1966–1969	35th	Hawke's Bay	National
1969–1972	36th	Hawke's Bay	National
1972–1975	37th	Hawke's Bay	National
1975–1978	38th	Hawke's Bay	National
1978–1981	39th	Hawke's Bay	National
1981–1984	40th	Hawke's Bay	National

In the 1963 election, Harrison stood for Parliament in the electorate of Hawke's Bay, and was successful. He served as a National Party backbencher for six years. After the 1969 election, he was made Junior Whip, and was Chairman of Committees in 1972, and again from 1976 to 1978. In 1978, he was elected Speaker after the death of Roy Jack. His Speakership ended at the 1984 election, when National Government lost, and when Harrison lost the election in the Hawke's Bay electorate to Bill Sutton.

In the 1980 Queen's Birthday Honours, Harrison was appointed a Knight Bachelor, two years after becoming speaker.

== Later life ==
After leaving Parliament, Harrison lived on his farm at Takapau. An early advocate for the potential of Central Hawke's Bay as a wine-growing region, he developed a vineyard on his farm in the early 1990s. Harrison died at Takapau on 5 September 2003, at the age of 82. His wife, Margaret, Lady Harrison, died in 2026, aged 102.

== Notes ==
Political offices
Preceded by Alfred E. Allen	Chairman of Committees of the House of Representatives; 1972; 1976–1978	Succeeded by Ron Bailey
Preceded by Jonathan Hunt	Chairman of Committees of the House of Representatives; 1972; 1976–1978	Succeeded by Jack Luxton
Preceded by Roy Jack	Speaker of the New Zealand House of Representatives; 1978–1984	Succeeded by Sir Basil Arthur
New Zealand Parliament
Preceded by Cyril Harker	Member of Parliament for Hawkes Bay; 1963–1984	Succeeded by Bill Sutton
