= Leo Schultz =

New Zealand politician (1914–1996)

Leo Charles Schultz QSM JP (17 October 1914 – 9 June 1996) was a New Zealand farmer and a politician of the National Party.

== Biography ==
New Zealand Parliament
Years	Term	Electorate	Party
1969–1972	36th	Hauraki	National
1972–1975	37th	Coromandel	National
1975–1978	38th	Coromandel	National
1978–1981	39th	Hauraki	National

Schultz was born in 1914 in Hāwera. He received his education at Ngatea District High School, and afterwards became a dairy and sheep farmer. In 1940, he married Evelyn Anne Bridgeman, the daughter of E. Bridgeman. They had two sons and two daughters.

He joined the National Party in 1938 and was chairman of the executive in the Hauraki electorate (1958–1969). He served on local government for 23 years before his parliamentary career.

He represented the electorate of Hauraki in Parliament from 1969 to 1972, Coromandel from 1972 to 1978 and then Hauraki again from 1978 to 1981, when he retired.

In the 1994 Queen's Birthday Honours, Schultz was awarded the Queen's Service Medal for public services.

New Zealand Parliament
Preceded by Arthur Kinsella	Member of Parliament for Hauraki; 1969–1972	Vacant Constituency abolished, recreated in 1978 Title next held by himself
Vacant Constituency recreated after abolition in 1890 Title last held by Alfred Cadman	Member of Parliament for Coromandel; 1972–1978	Vacant Constituency abolished, recreated in 1987 Title next held by Graeme Lee
Vacant Constituency recreated after abolition in 1972 Title last held by himself	Member of Parliament for Hauraki; 1978–1981	Succeeded by Graeme Lee
