= Jack Williams (New Zealand politician) =

New Zealand politician

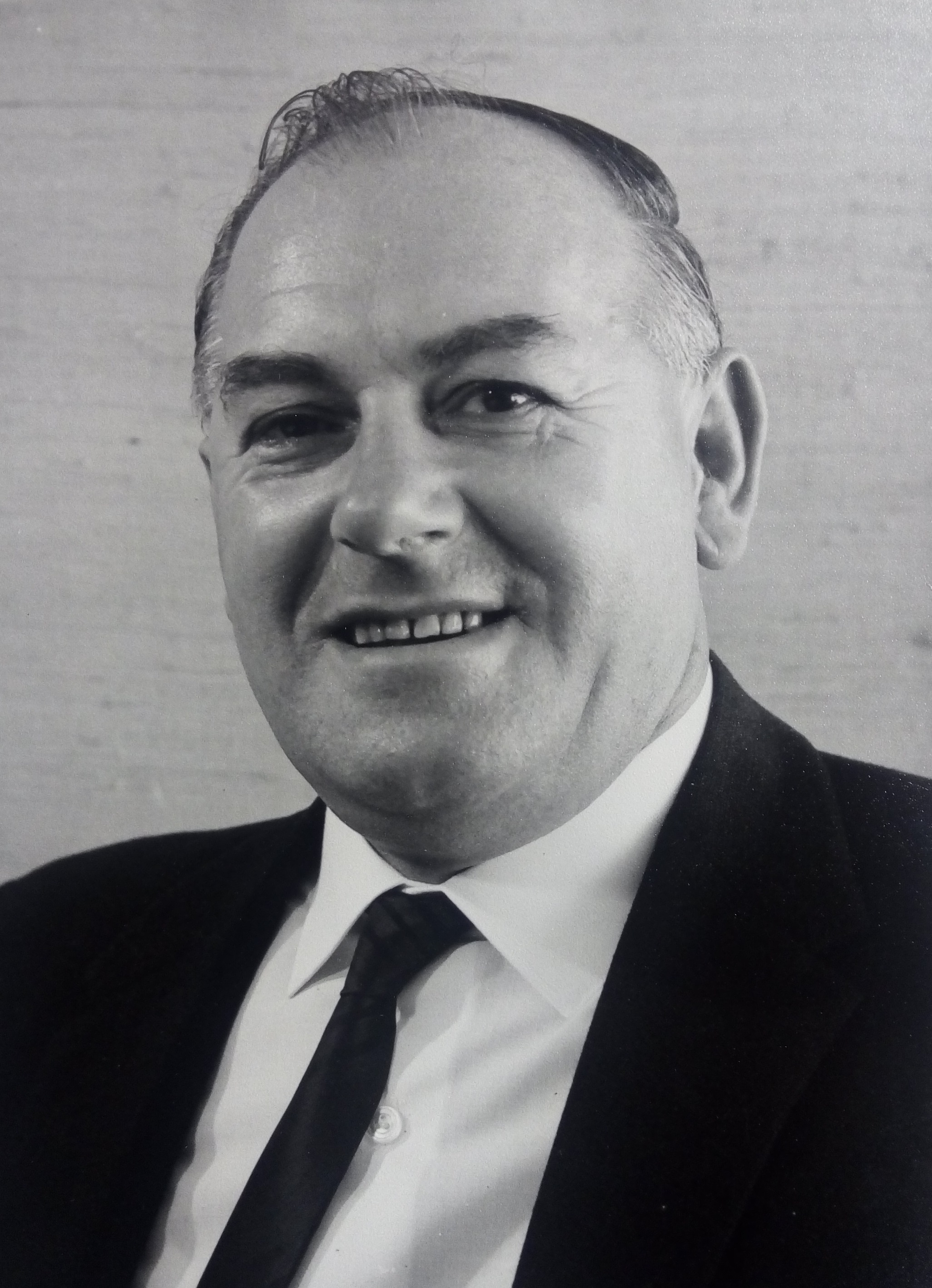

Member of the New Zealand Parliament for Wairarapa
- In office 29 November 1969 – 29 November 1975
- Preceded by: Haddon Donald
- Succeeded by: Ben Couch

Personal details
- Born: John Henry Williams; 21 December 1918 Lawrence, New Zealand
- Died: 12 December 1975 (aged 56) Masterton, New Zealand
- Party: Labour

John Henry Williams (21 December 1918 – 12 December 1975) was a New Zealand politician of the Labour Party.

== Biography ==
=== Early life and family ===
Williams was born in Lawrence, Otago, on 21 December 1918. His family moved north and he was educated at Kurow. Upon completing his education he moved to the Wairarapa region and took up farming in the town of Bideford. Prior to World War II, Williams was working as a farmhand in the Utiku area, southeast of Taihape.

During World War II, Williams enlisted in the New Zealand Army in 1941, as a part of the Infantry Brigade of the Second New Zealand Expeditionary Force. He served in both Egypt and Italy rising to the rank of sergeant-major by the end of the war, receiving the War Medal 1939–1945 and the New Zealand War Service Medal.

After the war he returned to farming in Bideford, and was allocated a 1,000-acre (400 ha) rehabilitation farm section, but later moved to farm at Te Ore Ore, near Masterton. He later became a farming equipment salesman, and was also an executive member of the Masterton Secondary Schools' Board of Governors.

Williams' engagement to Christina Ellen Carter was announced in January 1941, and the couple married after the end of the war, at Knox Presbyterian Church, Lower Hutt, on 3 November 1945.

=== Political career ===
New Zealand Parliament
Years	Term	Electorate	Party
1969–1972	36th	Wairarapa	Labour
1972–1975	37th	Wairarapa	Labour

Williams was for many years a member of the Masterton Licensing Trust. He stood unsuccessfully for the Labour Party in the 1963 election and 1966 election for the marginal Wairarapa seat. In the 1969 election and 1972 election he was successful, and he represented the Wairarapa electorate from 1969 to 1975. In 1974 he stood unsuccessfully for the role of Labour's junior whip. His majority in 1969 was 467 votes, and in 1972 was 1,086 votes.

During the 1975 election campaign, Williams collapsed and was admitted to hospital with a serious heart condition, leaving him little opportunity to campaign. His wife Chriss said that long hours, local duties to constituents and late-night debates at Parliament led him to often return home greatly fatigued, which contributed to his collapse. After spending four weeks in hospital, he was discharged, but was subsequently readmitted before finally being released to recuperate at home. At the election, Williams was defeated by Ben Couch.

=== Death ===
Williams died shortly after the election at his home in Masterton, aged 56 years. The Masterton Licensing Trust instructed hotels to close early on the day of his funeral as a mark of respect for his service. A notification of Williams' death was the first message Bill Rowling received after moving in to the office of Leader of the Opposition. Williams' wife died in 2008.

New Zealand Parliament
Preceded by Haddon Donald	Member of Parliament for Wairarapa; 1969–1975	Succeeded by Ben Couch
