= Waitotara (electorate) =

Waitotara was a New Zealand parliamentary electorate in South Taranaki. It existed from 1881 to 1893, and again from 1978 to 1996. It was represented by four Members of Parliament.

== Population centres ==
The previous electoral redistribution was undertaken in 1875 for the 1875–1876 election. In the six years since, New Zealand's European population had increased by 65%. In the 1881 electoral redistribution, the House of Representatives increased the number of European representatives to 91 (up from 84 since the 1875–76 election). The number of Māori electorates was held at four. The House further decided that electorates should not have more than one representative, which led to 35 new electorates being formed, including Waitotara, and two electorates that had previously been abolished to be recreated. This necessitated a major disruption to existing boundaries.

The electorate was rural, in South Taranaki. It was based on the town of Waitotara, and is north of the city of Wanganui. Its original area was bounded by Egmont and Taranaki in the west, Waipa in the north, and Rangitikei in the east. It bordered onto the South Taranaki Bight and went around the Wanganui electorate. It included the towns of Pātea, Pipiriki, Raetihi, and Ohakune.

== History ==
The electorate existed in the 19th century from 1881 to 1893. It was represented by John Bryce from 1881 to 1887, and then by George Hutchison from 1887 to 1893.

In the 20th century the seat existed from 1978 to the introduction of MMP in 1996 and was represented by two National MPs.

At the 1996 election, the bulk of the Waitotara electorate was merged with Wanganui to create the new electorate of Whanganui, and Peter Gresham was defeated by the Wanganui incumbent, Jill Pettis of the Labour Party. Gresham remained in Parliament as a list MP but retired in 1999.

=== Members of Parliament ===
Waitotara was represented by four Members of Parliament.

Key

Conservative Independent National

Elections	Winner
1881 election	John Bryce
1884 election	John Bryce
1887 election	George Hutchison
1890 election	George Hutchison
(Electorate abolished 1893–1978)
1978 election	Venn Young
1981 election	Venn Young
1984 election	Venn Young
1987 election	Venn Young
1990 election	Peter Gresham
1993 election	Peter Gresham

== Election results ==
=== 1890 election ===
1890 general election: Waitotara
Party	Candidate	Votes	%	±%
Independent	George Hutchison	953	50.58	
Conservative	Robert Bruce	931	49.42	
Majority		22	1.16	
Turnout		1,884	73.96	
Registered electors		2,547		
