= Colin McLachlan =

New Zealand politician

Colin Campbell Alexander McLachlan (28 November 1924 – 26 September 1985) was a New Zealand politician of the National Party.

== Biography ==
New Zealand Parliament
| Years | Term | Electorate | Party |
|---|---|---|---|
| 1966–1969 | 35th | Selwyn | National |
| 1969–1972 | 36th | Selwyn | National |
| 1972–1975 | 37th | Rakaia | National |
| 1975–1978 | 38th | Rakaia | National |
| 1978–1981 | 39th | Selwyn | National |

McLachlan was born in Christchurch in 1924. He received his education at Lakeside Primary School and at St. Andrew's College. He farmed at Methven and bred horses.

He first stood for election in the Christchurch Central electorate in 1957 election. He then became the Member of Parliament for Selwyn 1966–1972, then Rakaia 1972–1978, then Selwyn again 1978–1981.

He was the Minister of Railways, Minister of Transport and Minister of Civil Aviation and Meteorological Services in the Third National Government from 1975 to 1981, and a close friend of Prime Minister Muldoon. They owned race horses together, and at one time McLachlan was a "front bencher" which surprised many political observers. He was appointed to the board of the Reserve Bank by Muldoon in 1981.

Hugh Templeton wrote that McLachlan:

was the only real confidant Muldoon had in power. I had a feeling that Muldoon may have enticed him into politics as someone who had a good knowledge of the National Party and whom he liked. As a minister, McLachlan was slow and not very active, but he was influentially placed in the middle of cabinet. Muldoon could trust him completely; he knew that unlike others McLachlan would never compete. They spent a lot of time together, talking shop and drinking. Muldoon, from my experience, did most of the talking. McLachlan, the listener, was the ultimate good mate. He was an invaluable sounding board for the relatively friendless Muldoon and his door was one route through which fellow parliamentarians might approach the prickly prime minister.

In 1981, Ruth Richardson successfully challenged the re-nomination of McLachlan in the Selwyn electorate.

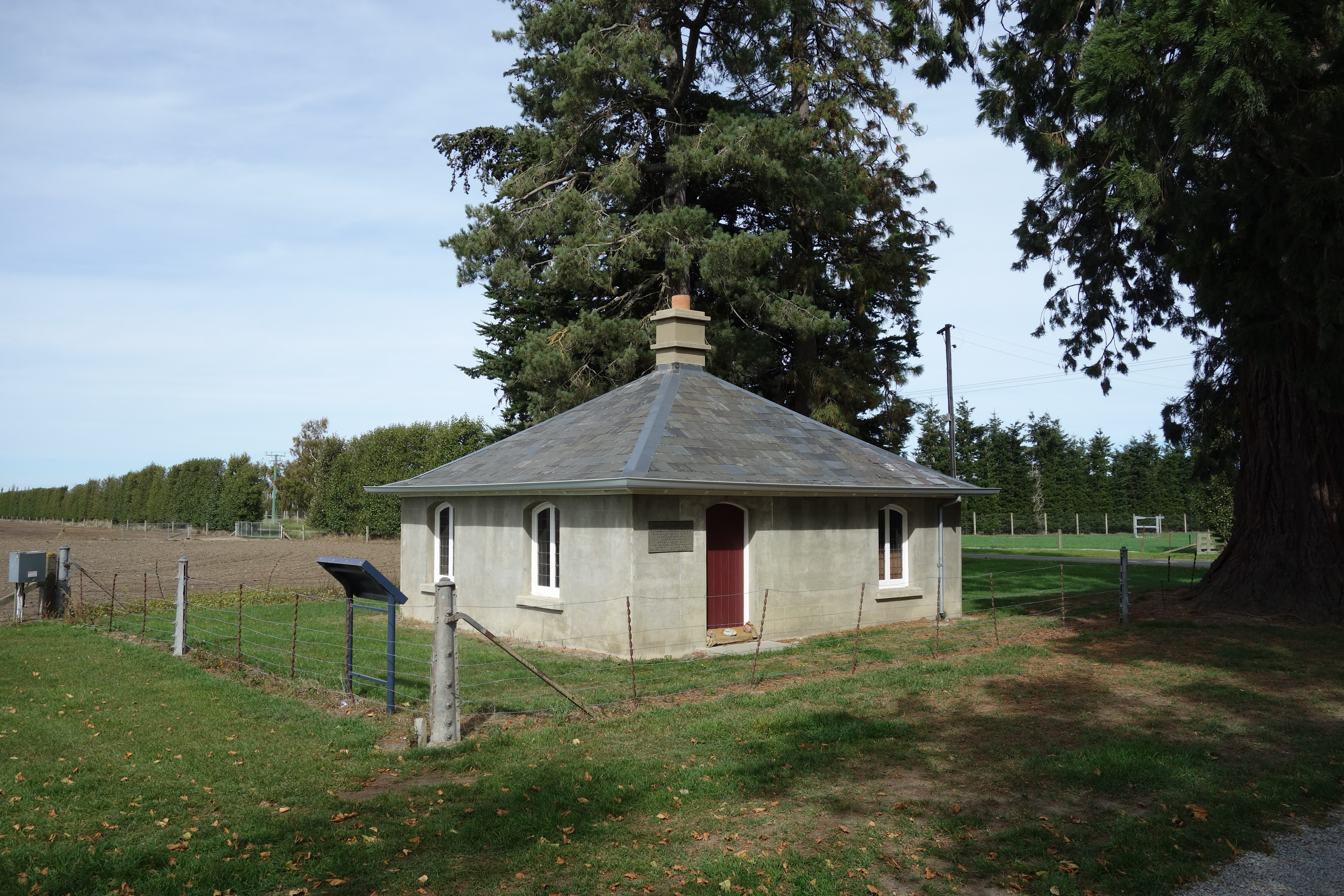
Corwar Gatekeepers Lodge in 2015

The McLachlans gave the derelict Corwar Gatekeepers Lodge near Barrhill to the people of the Ashburton District. Renovation began in 1970, with work carried out and financed by descendants of previous inhabitants of the building. The building was formally reopened by the Prime Minister of the time, Robert Muldoon in March 1979. The gate house is fitted out as a museum, and viewing can be arranged through the Ashburton or Methven information centres.

== Notes ==
Political offices
| Preceded by Ron Bailey | Minister of Railways; 1975–1981 | Succeeded by George Gair |
New Zealand Parliament
| Preceded by John McAlpine | Member of Parliament for Selwyn; 1966–1972; 1978–1981 | In abeyance Title next held by himself |
| In abeyance Title last held by himself | Member of Parliament for Selwyn; 1966–1972; 1978–1981 | Succeeded by Ruth Richardson |
| New constituency | Member of Parliament for Rakaia; 1972–1978 | In abeyance Title next held by Jenny Shipley |
