= William Bodkin (New Zealand politician) =

New Zealand politician

The Honourable Sir William Bodkin KCVO
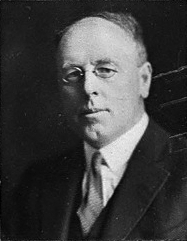

14th Minister of Internal Affairs
- In office 13 December 1949 – 26 November 1954
- Prime Minister: Sidney Holland
- Preceded by: Bill Parry
- Succeeded by: Sid Smith

Member of the New Zealand Parliament for Otago Central
- In office 14 November 1928 – 5 October 1954
- Succeeded by: Jack George

Personal details
- Born: 28 April 1883 Queenstown, New Zealand
- Died: 15 June 1964 (aged 81) Alexandra, New Zealand
- Party: Liberal (1914-1928); United (1928-1936); National (from 1936)
- Spouse: Elizabeth McCorkindale (m. 1920)
- Children: 1
- Education: University of Otago
- Profession: Lawyer

Sir William Alexander Bodkin KCVO (28 April 1883 – 15 June 1964) was a New Zealand politician of the United Party, and from 1936, the National Party.

== Biography ==
=== Early life ===
Bodkin was born in Queenstown in 1883. In 1889 his father moved to Clyde in a farm named "Monte Cristo" next to the Clutha River. The farm had the first irrigation scheme in Central Otago built by Jean Desire Feraud. After attending Clyde School to the sixth standard, Bodkin worked on his father's farm where he saved his salary to study law. Aged 18 he entered Wilson's Grammar School, Christchurch where he passed his university entrance examination. He then attended University of Otago and in 1908 he qualified as a solicitor. The next year he was admitted as a barrister and began practice at Alexandra, specialising in mining law.

On 1 September 1920 Bodkin married schoolteacher Elizabeth Lillias McCorkindale at Manuka Creek, South Otago. They had one daughter. He formed the first irrigation league in Central Otago and for more than 30 years he advocated the extension of irrigation in the region. As a result irrigation schemes were developed in places such as Manorburn, Manuherikia, Teviot, Tarras, Poolburn, Idabur leading to hundreds of acres being brought into production.

=== Political career ===
New Zealand Parliament
Years	Term	Electorate	Party
1928–1931	23rd	Otago Central	United
1931–1935	24th	Otago Central	United
1935–1936	25th	Otago Central	United
1936–1938	Changed allegiance to:		National
1938–1943	26th	Otago Central	National
1943–1946	27th	Otago Central	National
1946–1949	28th	Otago Central	National
1949–1951	29th	Otago Central	National
1951–1954	30th	Otago Central	National

After a stint as Alexandra's borough solicitor he served one term as a member of the Alexandra Borough Council. At the 1914 election he contested the rural Otago electorate of Otago Central as the Liberal Party candidate, but was defeated by the incumbent Robert Scott. At the 1928 election election he was successful at winning the seat which he held until 1954, when he retired. He was Chairman of Committees from 1930 to 1931. In 1935 he was an attendee at the Empire Parliamentary Conference.

He was Minister of Civil Defence in the War Administration in 1942. In the Holland Ministry of the First National Government, he was Minister of Internal Affairs (1949–1954) and Minister of Social Security (1950–1954).

In 1954 Bodkin proposed to celebrate the centenary of Parliamentary government in New Zealand by a series of authoritative studies on the history of government in New Zealand. Dr Alexander Hare McLintock was appointed to write the works. Only one work was completed, 1958's Crown Colony Government in New Zealand.

== Honours ==
In 1935, he was awarded the King George V Silver Jubilee Medal, and in 1953 he was awarded the Queen Elizabeth II Coronation Medal. He was appointed a Knight Commander of the Royal Victorian Order in 1954.

In 1955, Bodkin was granted the use of the title of "Honourable" for life, having served more than three years as a member of the Executive Council.

== Notes ==
Political offices
Preceded by Sydney George Smith	Chairman of Committees of the House of Representatives; 1930–1931	Succeeded by Sydney George Smith
New Zealand Parliament
In abeyance Title last held by Robert Scott	Member of Parliament for Central Otago; 1928–1954	Succeeded by Jack George
