= Venn Young =

New Zealand politician

Venn Young QSO

16th Minister for Social Development
- In office 12 February 1981 – 26 July 1984
- Prime Minister: Robert Muldoon
- Preceded by: George Gair
- Succeeded by: Ann Hercus

4th Minister for the Environment
- In office 12 December 1975 – 11 December 1981
- Prime Minister: Robert Muldoon
- Preceded by: Whetu Tirikatene-Sullivan
- Succeeded by: David Thomson

19th Minister for Forestry
- In office 12 December 1975 – 11 December 1981
- Prime Minister: Robert Muldoon
- Preceded by: Colin Moyle
- Succeeded by: Jonathan Elworthy

37th Minister of Lands
- In office 12 December 1975 – 11 December 1981
- Prime Minister: Robert Muldoon
- Preceded by: Matiu Rata
- Succeeded by: Jonathan Elworthy

Member of the New Zealand Parliament for Waitotara
- In office 25 November 1978 – 27 October 1990
- Preceded by: Constituency Reestablished
- Succeeded by: Peter Gresham

Member of the New Zealand Parliament for Egmont
- In office 26 November 1966 – 25 November 1978
- Preceded by: William Sheat
- Succeeded by: Constituency Abolished

Personal details
- Born: Venn Spearman Young; 16 January 1929 Stratford, New Zealand
- Died: 14 January 1993 (aged 63)
- Resting place: Hawera Cemetery
- Party: National
- Children: 9, including Jonathan
- Education: Nelson College

Venn Spearman Young QSO (16 February 1929 – 14 January 1993) was a New Zealand politician. He was a member of the National Party, and served as a Cabinet Minister in the government of Robert Muldoon. He is known for his failed attempt to legalise "homosexual acts" in 1975.

== Early life ==
Young was born in Stratford, Taranaki. He attended primary school in Stratford, but received his high school education in Nelson, at Nelson College from 1942 to 1944. He then returned to Taranaki, becoming a dairy farmer. He gained some distinction as a rugby player, representing Taranaki. He was also active in the Anglican Church.

== Member of Parliament ==
New Zealand Parliament
| Years | Term | Electorate | Party |
|---|---|---|---|
| 1966–1969 | 35th | Egmont | National |
| 1969–1972 | 36th | Egmont | National |
| 1972–1975 | 37th | Egmont | National |
| 1975–1978 | 38th | Egmont | National |
| 1978–1981 | 39th | Waitotara | National |
| 1981–1984 | 40th | Waitotara | National |
| 1984–1987 | 41st | Waitotara | National |
| 1987–1990 | 42nd | Waitotara | National |

In the 1966 election, Young stood as the National Party's candidate for the Egmont electorate, and was successful. He was to hold Egmont in the next three elections, gaining a straight majority each time. At the 1978 election, the Egmont electorate was abolished, and Young successfully contested the new Waitotara electorate. He remained the MP for Waitotara until his departure from politics.

=== Private members' Bill ===
In mid 1974, Young attracted considerable controversy by putting forward a private members' bill to legalise private "homosexual acts" between consenting adults. The proposed age of consent was twenty-one, and although this was later reduced to twenty by a select committee, a number of homosexual lobbyists criticised it on this count. By far the most vocal criticism, however, came from conservatives, including many of his National Party colleagues. On 4 July 1975, the bill was defeated, with 34 votes against and 29 votes in favour. There were 24 abstentions.

=== Cabinet minister ===
Despite having alienated many of his party colleagues, Young entered Cabinet when National won the 1975 election. Robert Muldoon, the new Prime Minister, appointed Young to the Ministry of Lands, Forests, and Environment portfolios, which he held for two parliamentary terms from December 1975 to 1981. In 1981, Young was moved to the Social Welfare portfolio, which he retained until National's defeat in the 1984 election.

In the 1990 New Year Honours, Young was appointed a Companion of the Queen's Service Order for public services.

== Later life, death, and legacy ==
In 1986, Young voted against the Homosexual Law Reform Bill (promoted by Labour's Fran Wilde), after an amendment he had proposed setting the homosexual age of consent at 20 was rejected.

Young retired from parliament at the 1990 election.

He died in January 1993 following a heart attack, and was buried in Hawera Cemetery. He was survived by his wife and nine children, including Jonathan Young who served as the National MP for the New Plymouth electorate from 2008 to 2020 and Audrey Young, senior political correspondent and former political editor of The New Zealand Herald.

== Notes ==
New Zealand Parliament
| Preceded by William Sheat | Member of Parliament for Egmont; 1966–1978 | Constituency abolished |
| Vacant Constituency recreated after abolition in 1893 Title last held by George Hutchison | Member of Parliament for Waitotara; 1978–1990 | Succeeded by Peter Gresham |
Political offices
| Preceded by Whetu Tirikatene-Sullivan | Minister for the Environment; 1975–1981 | Succeeded by Ian Shearer |
