= Rob Talbot =

New Zealand politician

Robert Leslie Gapper Talbot QSO (18 October 1923 – 13 December 2012) was a New Zealand politician who represented the National Party as a Member of Parliament. A Muldoon loyalist, he was a cabinet minister from 1981 to 1984 in the Third National Government, serving as Postmaster-General and Minister of Tourism.

== Early life and family ==
Born in Temuka on 18 October 1923, Talbot was the son of Elsie and Leslie Talbot. He was educated at Waitaki Boys' High School. In 1947, Talbot married Anne Sandston, and the couple had three children.

== Member of Parliament ==
New Zealand Parliament
| Years | Term | Electorate | Party |
|---|---|---|---|
| 1966–1969 | 35th | Ashburton | National |
| 1969–1972 | 36th | South Canterbury | National |
| 1972–1975 | 37th | South Canterbury | National |
| 1975–1978 | 38th | South Canterbury | National |
| 1978–1981 | 39th | Ashburton | National |
| 1981–1984 | 40th | Ashburton | National |
| 1984–1987 | 41st | Ashburton | National |

Talbot represented the Ashburton electorate in Parliament from 1966 to 1969, then the South Canterbury electorate from 1969 to 1978, and then the Ashburton electorate again from 1978 until his retirement in 1987 whereupon he was replaced by Jenny Shipley.

As Postmaster-General he signed off on New Zealand's first cellular network in 1983. In 1984, at a time when the use of Māori phrases was as yet uncommon in New Zealand, an Auckland telephone operator, Naida Glavish, was instructed to stop using "kia ora" when greeting callers after the post office had received a complaint. She refused to do so and was consequently stood down, with the whole affair attracting much public interest. Talbot, as Postmaster-General, is credited with successfully convincing the Prime Minister, Robert Muldoon, to overturn that prohibition.

== Later life and death ==
On 4 July 2007, Talbot was awarded a Certificate of Appreciation from former United States Ambassador to New Zealand Bill McCormick for his efforts in fostering positive relations between the United States and New Zealand during his tenure with the New Zealand American Association.

Talbot died on 13 December 2012 in Wellington. His wife Anne had died before him. He was survived by partner, Wilhelmina Pondman, one son, and two daughters.

== Honours and awards ==
In 1977, Talbot was awarded the Queen Elizabeth II Silver Jubilee Medal, and in 1990 he received the New Zealand 1990 Commemoration Medal. In the 1991 Queen's Birthday Honours, Talbot was appointed a Companion of the Queen's Service Order for public services.

Political offices
| Preceded by John Falloon | Postmaster-General; 1982–1984 | Succeeded by Jonathan Hunt |
New Zealand Parliament
| Preceded by Geoff Gerard | Member of Parliament for Ashburton; 1966–1969; 1978–1987 | In abeyance Title next held by himself |
| In abeyance Title last held by himself | Member of Parliament for Ashburton; 1966–1969; 1978–1987 | Succeeded by Jenny Shipley |
| New constituency | Member of Parliament for South Canterbury; 1969–1978 | Constituency abolished |
