= Murray Robert Smith =

New Zealand politician (1941–2009)

Murray Robert Smith (6 June 1941 – 27 September 2009) was a New Zealand politician of the Labour Party.

== Biography ==
New Zealand Parliament
Years	Term	Electorate	Party
1972–1975	37th	Whangarei	Labour

Smith was born in Hamilton in 1941. He became a civil servant and later a member of the Whangarei Adult Education Committee.

=== Political career ===
He joined the Labour Party and was secretary of both the Marsden and Hamilton Labour Representation Committees. He unsuccessfully contested Piako in 1966 finishing third and Marsden in 1969 finishing second.

He was elected for the Whangarei electorate with the swing to Labour in the 1972 general election. Smith was also assisted by the National Government's decision to contract the construction of naval patrol craft overseas, which impacted local workers in Whangarei's ship building industry. In his maiden speech to Parliament Smith called for greater protection of the coastline by banning the construction of houses on the seaward side of coastal roads. He was seeking to ensure better public access to the coastal areas.

Smith was defeated in the next election in 1975 which saw a significant swing back to National. In early 1977 he contemplated standing as a candidate for the Labour Party nomination in the Mangere by-election, however he ultimately decided to withdraw from the candidacy race.

=== Public service ===
Formerly a Public Trust accountant, he was made managing director of the Development Finance Corporation and executive chairman of New Zealand Railways by Labour. From his time in Parliament, he was a friend of Roger Douglas, and of Michael Bassett who said that his "contribution to New Zealand went well beyond what he managed in three short years to do for the people of Whangarei".

=== Baháʼí Faith ===
He joined the Baháʼí community in 1989, becoming the chief executive officer in New Zealand in 1991 and deputy secretary-general of the Baháʼí international secretariat in 1994. He died in Raglan on 27 September 2009.

New Zealand Parliament
New constituency	Member of Parliament for Whangarei; 1972–1975	Succeeded by John Elliott
