= Rakaia (electorate) =

Rakaia was a New Zealand parliamentary electorate in the Canterbury region from 1972 to 1978 and 1993 to 2008.

The seat was held by former prime minister Jenny Shipley from 1993 to 2002, and by Brian Connell from 2002 to 2008.

== Population centres ==
Since the 1969 election, the number of electorates in the South Island was fixed at 25, with continued faster population growth in the North Island leading to an increase in the number of general electorates. There were 84 electorates for the 1969 election, and the 1972 electoral redistribution saw three additional general seats created for the North Island, bringing the total number of electorates to 87. Together with increased urbanisation in Christchurch and Nelson, the changes proved very disruptive to existing electorates. In the South Island, three electorates were abolished, and three electorates were newly created (including Rakaia). In the North Island, five electorates were abolished, two electorates were recreated, and six electorates were newly created.

The electorate included the following population centres:

- Ashburton
- Darfield
- Leeston
- Lincoln
- Methven
- Rakaia
- Rolleston
- Southbridge
- West Melton

== History ==
The Rakaia seat previously existed from 1972 to 1978, when it was held by Colin McLachlan of the National Party, who previously and subsequently held the Selwyn seat. It was recreated in 1993 as a replacement for Ashburton.

Due to boundary changes for the 2008 general election, the Rakaia seat ceased to exist. Its population centres were redistributed among the new seats of Rangitata and Selwyn.

In the 2008 election, Selwyn was expected to be a safe National seat while Rangitata was considered vulnerable to capture by Labour due to the presence of the city of Timaru. While Amy Adams won Selwyn for National as expected, Rangitata was taken by National's Jo Goodhew.

=== Members of Parliament ===
Key

National

Election	Winner
1972 election	Colin McLachlan
1975 election	Colin McLachlan
(Electorate abolished 1978–1993)
1993 election	Jenny Shipley
1996 election	Jenny Shipley
1999 election	Jenny Shipley
2002 election	Brian Connell
2005 election	Brian Connell

== Election results ==
=== 1999 election ===
Refer to Candidates in the New Zealand general election 1999 by electorate#Rakaia for a list of candidates.

=== 1975 election ===
1975 general election: Rakaia
Party	Candidate	Votes	%	±%
National	Colin McLachlan	10,532	60.0	+5.9
Labour	Graeme Lowrie	5,295	30.2	
Social Credit	John Bridson Brinsdon	988	5.6	
Values	Monique Brocx	743	4.2	
Majority		5,237	29.8	+16.3
Turnout		20,938	84.1	−5.2

=== 1972 election ===
1972 general election: Rakaia
Party	Candidate	Votes	%	±%
National	Colin McLachlan	8,557	54.1	
Labour	Alex Clark	6,424	40.6	
Social Credit	Richard Hooper	754	4.7	
New Democratic	Edmund Victor Wall	90	0.6	
Majority		2,133	13.5	
Turnout		17,282	89.3	
