= Jack George (politician) =

New Zealand politician

New Zealand Parliament
| Years | Term | Electorate | Party |
|---|---|---|---|
| 1954–1957 | 31st | Central Otago | National |
| 1957–1960 | 32nd | Otago Central | National |
| 1960–1963 | 33rd | Otago Central | National |
| 1963–1966 | 34th | Otago Central | National |
| 1966–1969 | 35th | Otago Central | National |

John Hannibal George OBE JP (30 May 1901 – 22 May 1996) was a New Zealand politician of the National Party.

George was born in 1901 at Roxburgh. After his education at Otago Boys' High School, he became a fruit grower. In 1953, he was awarded the Queen Elizabeth II Coronation Medal.

George won the Central Otago electorate in 1954 after William Bodkin retired. The electorate was renamed to Otago Central in 1957, and George held it to 1969, when he retired. He had served as Chairman of Committees from 1967 to 1969.

George was appointed an Officer of the Order of the British Empire for services to politics in the 1970 New Year Honours, and received the New Zealand 1990 Commemoration Medal in 1990. He died in 1996.

== Notes ==
Political offices
| Preceded by Roy Jack | Chairman of Committees of the House of Representatives; 1967–1969 | Succeeded by Alfred E. Allen |
New Zealand Parliament
| Preceded by William Bodkin | Member of Parliament for Central Otago / Otago Central; 1954–1969 | Succeeded by Murray Rose |
