= Ian Quigley =

New Zealand politician

Member of the New Zealand Parliament for Otago Central
- In office 25 November 1972 – 29 November 1975
- Preceded by: Murray Rose
- Succeeded by: Warren Cooper

Personal details
- Born: Ian Terence Quigley; 16 October 1931 Leeston, New Zealand
- Died: 3 May 2016 (aged 84) Timaru, New Zealand
- Party: Labour
- Spouse: Marian Brown (m. 1957)
- Children: 4

Ian Terence Quigley (16 October 1931 – 3 May 2016) was a former New Zealand politician of the Labour Party.

== Biography ==
=== Early life and career ===
Quigley was born in Leeston in 1931, the son of William Quigley. He received his education at Waitaki Boys' High School. He gained employment as a carpenter with the Otago Education Board before moving to Cromwell in 1960. There he became the proprietor of a petrol station and garage. In 1957, he married Marian Brown, the daughter of Cecil Brown. They had one son and three daughters.

=== Political career ===
New Zealand Parliament
Years	Term	Electorate	Party
1972–1975	37th	Otago Central	Labour

Quigley served on the Cromwell Borough Council (1962–1975), and was the Deputy Mayor (1971–1975). He was also a member of the Otago Regional Development Council (1973–1975), and Otago Council (1970–1975). He was regional Civil Defence controller for the Vincent County combined area from 1970 to 1975. He was also a member of the Clutha River Development Committee.

One of his friends introduced him to Labour MP Roger Douglas who suggested he stand for Labour in the Otago Central electorate in the 1972 election. Despite initial apprehensions, he took up the offer and became a candidate. Quigley won the seat represented the Otago Central electorate for Labour for three years from 1972 to 1975, when he was defeated by Warren Cooper. His majority in 1972 was 1,483 votes. He sought the Labour nomination for the 1985 Timaru by-election, but lost the selection to lawyer Jan Walker.

=== Later life and death ===
Quigley had no direct involvement in political activities thereafter, but still took an intense interest in politics and was a member the committee of the Former Parliamentarians Association. He shifted from Cromwell to Timaru and worked at DB Breweries before retiring in 1999. He also coordinated the famous Clydesdale team of horses.

He was awarded the New Zealand 1990 Commemoration Medal. For recreation, he enjoyed boating and golf. He died on 3 May 2016.

== Notes ==
New Zealand Parliament
Preceded by Murray Rose	Member of Parliament for Otago Central; 1972–1975	Succeeded by Warren Cooper
