= Peter Gresham =

New Zealand politician (1933–2024)

The Honourable Peter Gresham ONZM JP

Member of the New Zealand Parliament for Waitotara
- In office 1990–1996
- Preceded by: Venn Young

Member of the New Zealand Parliament for National party list
- In office 1996–1999

Personal details
- Born: Peter John Gresham; 7 July 1933 Geraldine, New Zealand
- Died: 31 August 2024 (aged 91) Whanganui, New Zealand
- Party: National
- Spouse: Margot Gresham
- Cabinet: Minister of Social Welfare and Minister of Senior Citizens

Peter John Gresham ONZM JP (7 July 1933 – 31 August 2024) was a New Zealand politician. He was a Member of Parliament from 1990 to 1999, representing the National Party.

== Early life ==
Gresham was born in Geraldine in 1933, and was educated at St Kevin's College in Oamaru. Before entering politics, Gresham was an accountant.

== Political career ==
New Zealand Parliament
Years	Term	Electorate	List	Party
1990–1993	43rd	Waitotara		National
1993–1996	44th	Waitotara		National
1996–1999	45th	List	24	National

Gresham was first elected to Parliament in the 1990 election as MP for Waitotara, and then re-elected in the 1993 election. At the 1996 election, the bulk of his Waitotara seat was merged with Wanganui to create the new seat of Whanganui, and Gresham was defeated by Jill Pettis of the Labour Party. Gresham remained in Parliament as a list MP, but retired at the 1999 election.

From 1993 to 1996, he served as Minister of Social Welfare and Minister of Senior Citizens.

== Death ==
Gresham died in Whanganui on 31 August 2024, at the age of 91. He was predeceased by his wife of 61 years, Margot, in 2022.

== Honours ==
In the 2002 Queen's Birthday and Golden Jubilee Honours, Gresham was appointed an Officer of the New Zealand Order of Merit, for public services. He was a Knight of Malta, a Catholic religious military order.

New Zealand Parliament
Preceded by Venn Young	Member of Parliament for Waitotara; 1990–1996	Constituency abolished Contested Whanganui instead
