= Murray Rose (politician) =

New Zealand politician (1939–2021)

John Murray Rose QSM (14 December 1939 – 5 August 2021) was a New Zealand politician of the National Party.

== Biography ==
New Zealand Parliament
Years	Term	Electorate	Party
1969–1972	36th	Otago Central	National

Rose was born in Dunedin in 1939. He received his education at Waitahuna Primary and John McGlashan College. Afterwards, he was a farmer in Waitahuna in the Clutha District, some 10 kilometres (6.2 mi) from Lawrence. He held roles with Federated Farmers, the Presbyterian Church, Lions Clubs International, and the Lawrence Club.

Rose married Christine Mary Fulton, the daughter of Bruce I. Fulton, on 22 October 1966. They had five daughters.

He won the Otago Central electorate in 1969 after the retirement of Jack George, but was defeated by Labour's Ian Quigley in 1972. He was one of four National Party incumbents from Otago and Southland who lost their normally blue electorate to the Labour challenger over the proposed raising of the lake levels of lakes Manapouri and Te Anau, which was opposed by the Save Manapouri campaign. Labour's election manifesto was for the lakes to remain at their natural levels.

In the 1994 Queen's Birthday Honours, Rose was awarded the Queen's Service Medal for public services. In 1999, he was diagnosed with Parkinson's disease. He published his autobiography, More Than Meets the Eye, in 2010, with a reviewer commenting that the "political material is particularly interesting". Rose died in Dunedin on 5 August 2021.

== Bibliography ==
- Rose, J. Murray (2010). More Than Meets the Eye. Lawrence, New Zealand: self-published. ISBN 9780473183479.

New Zealand Parliament
Preceded by Jack George	Member of Parliament for Otago Central; 1969–1972	Succeeded by Ian Quigley
