= Otago Central =

Otago Central or Central Otago was a parliamentary electorate in the Otago region of New Zealand, from 1911 to 1919 as Otago Central; from 1928 to 1957 as Central Otago; and from 1957 to 1978 as Otago Central. It was replaced by the Otago electorate. The electorate was represented by six Members of Parliament.

== Population centres ==
In the 1911 electoral redistribution, the North Island gained a further seat from the South Island due to faster population growth. In addition, there were substantial population movements within each island, and significant changes resulted from this. Only four electorates were unaltered, five electorates were abolished, one former electorate was re-established, and four electorates, including Otago Central, were created for the first time. The Otago Central electorate mostly covered areas that previously belonged to the Tuapeka and Taieri electorates, which were both abolished through the 1911 electoral redistribution. Settlements that fell within the original Otago Central electorate included Roxburgh, Alexandra, and Ranfurly.

In the 1918 electoral redistribution, the Otago Central electorate was abolished. Most of its area went to an enlarged Wakatipu electorate, but smaller areas went to the Clutha, Bruce, and Waitaki electorates.

In the 1927 electoral redistribution, the North Island gained a further electorate from the South Island due to faster population growth. Five electorates were abolished, two former electorates, including Central Otago, were re-established, and three electorates were created for the first time.

== History ==
The first representative of the Otago Central electorate was Robert Scott, who was the incumbent from the Tuapeka electorate.

=== Members of Parliament ===
The Otago Central electorate was represented by six Members of Parliament:

Key

Reform United National Labour

Election	Winner
1911 election	Robert Scott
1914 election	Robert Scott
Abolished 1919, re-established as Central Otago 1928
1928 election	William Bodkin
1931 election	William Bodkin
1935 election	William Bodkin
1938 election	William Bodkin
1943 election	William Bodkin
1946 election	William Bodkin
1949 election	William Bodkin
1951 election	William Bodkin
1954 election	Jack George
Renamed as Otago Central 1957
1957 election	Jack George
1960 election	Jack George
1963 election	Jack George
1966 election	Jack George
1969 election	Murray Rose
1972 election	Ian Quigley
1975 election	Warren Cooper
(Electorate abolished in 1978; see Otago)

== Election results ==
=== 1975 election ===
1975 general election: Otago Central
Party	Candidate	Votes	%	±%
National	Warren Cooper	10,354	52.32	
Labour	Ian Quigley	7,983	40.34	−10.74
Social Credit	R S Moodie	910	4.59	
Values	John Perkins	542	2.73	
Majority		2,371	11.98	
Turnout		19,789	87.67	−4.73
Registered electors		22,572		

=== 1972 election ===
1972 general election: Otago Central
Party	Candidate	Votes	%	±%
Labour	Ian Quigley	8,544	51.08	
National	Murray Rose	7,061	42.22	−0.61
Social Credit	J Woodhall	721	4.31	
Values	Arthur Klap	258	1.54	
New Democratic	Patrick McMullan	140	0.83	−14.67
Majority		1,483	8.86	
Turnout		16,724	92.40	+3.76
Registered electors		18,099		

=== 1969 election ===
1969 general election: Otago Central
Party	Candidate	Votes	%	±%
National	Murray Rose	6,345	42.83	
Labour	Brian Griffiths	5,259	35.50	+2.45
Social Credit	Patrick McMullan	2,297	15.50	
Country Party	John Perkins	793	5.35	
Independent Labour	Jamie Wedderspoon	118	0.79	
Majority		1,086	7.33	
Turnout		14,812	88.64	+1.25
Registered electors		16,709		

=== 1966 election ===
1966 general election: Otago Central
Party	Candidate	Votes	%	±%
National	Jack George	7,060	49.07	−10.41
Labour	Brian Griffiths	4,755	33.05	
Social Credit	George Irvin Jones	2,571	17.87	
Majority		2,305	16.02	−2.95
Turnout		14,386	87.39	+0.03
Registered electors		16,460		

=== 1963 election ===
1963 general election: Otago Central
Party	Candidate	Votes	%	±%
National	Jack George	8,388	59.48	−3.25
Labour	Stan Rodger	5,713	40.51	
Majority		2,675	18.97	−18.26
Turnout		14,101	87.36	−3.51
Registered electors		16,141		

=== 1960 election ===
1960 general election: Otago Central
Party	Candidate	Votes	%	±%
National	Jack George	7,320	62.73	+5.79
Labour	Brian MacDonell	2,976	25.50	
Social Credit	George Irvin Jones	1,372	11.75	
Majority		4,344	37.23	+15.17
Turnout		11,668	90.87	−2.81
Registered electors		12,840		

=== 1957 election ===
1957 general election: Otago Central
Party	Candidate	Votes	%	±%
National	Jack George	7,196	56.94	+8.91
Labour	J H Rapson	4,408	34.88	
Social Credit	J D F Sloan	1,033	8.17	
Majority		2,788	22.06	+7.62
Turnout		12,637	93.68	+4.33
Registered electors		13,489		

=== 1954 election ===
1954 general election: Central Otago
Party	Candidate	Votes	%	±%
National	Jack George	6,895	48.03	
Labour	Peter John Scott	4,821	33.58	
Social Credit	A G Newland	2,638	18.37	
Majority		2,074	14.44	
Turnout		14,354	89.35	+1.74
Registered electors		16,064		

=== 1951 election ===
1951 general election: Central Otago
Party	Candidate	Votes	%	±%
National	William Bodkin	8,429	63.67	−1.34
Labour	Thomas Augustus Rodgers	4,809	36.33	+1.34
Majority		3,620	27.34	−2.68
Turnout		13,238	87.61	−3.37
Registered electors		15,109		

=== 1949 election ===
1949 general election: Central Otago
Party	Candidate	Votes	%	±%
National	William Bodkin	8,457	65.01	+3.69
Labour	Thomas Augustus Rodgers	4,551	34.99	
Majority		3,906	30.02	+7.37
Turnout		13,008	90.98	−1.42
Registered electors		14,297		

=== 1946 election ===
1949 general election: Central Otago
Party	Candidate	Votes	%	±%
National	William Bodkin	7,874	61.32	
Labour	Claude Charles Capell	4,965	38.68	
Majority		2,909	22.65	
Turnout		12,839	92.40	
Registered electors		13,894		

=== 1943 election ===
There were three candidates in 1943, with the election won by William Bodkin over James McIndoe Mackay.

=== 1931 election ===
1931 general election: Central Otago
Party	Candidate	Votes	%	±%
United	William Bodkin	5,156	66.14	
Independent	Charles Todd	2,640	33.86	
Informal votes		147	1.85	
Majority		2,516	32.27	
Turnout		7,943	82.10	
Registered electors		9,675		

=== 1928 election ===
1928 general election: Central Otago
Party	Candidate	Votes	%	±%
United	William Bodkin	4,684	53.75	
Reform	James Ritchie	4,031	46.25	
Informal votes		58	0.66	
Majority		653	7.49	
Turnout		8,773	89.34	
Registered electors		9,820		
