= South Canterbury (electorate) =

South Canterbury is a former parliamentary electorate, in South Canterbury, New Zealand. It existed for three parliamentary terms from 1969 to 1978.

== Population centres ==
Through an amendment in the Electoral Act in 1965, the number of electorates in the South Island was fixed at 25, an increase of one since the 1962 electoral redistribution. It was accepted that through the more rapid population growth in the North Island, the number of its electorates would continue to increase, and to keep proportionality, three new electorates were allowed for in the 1967 electoral redistribution for the next election. In the North Island, five electorates were newly created and one electorate was reconstituted while three electorates were abolished. In the South Island, three electorates were newly created (including South Canterbury) and one electorate was reconstituted while three electorates were abolished. The overall effect of the required changes was highly disruptive to existing electorates, with all but three electorates having their boundaries altered. These changes came into effect with the 1969 election.

In the 1967 electoral redistribution, the Ashburton electorate move significantly north, and most of that electorates area came to the South Canterbury electorate. In the south, some area was gained from the Waitaki electorate. Rural land that was previously with the Timaru electorate was also absorbed. The electorate was rural and settlements included Mount Somers, Mount Cook Village, Albury, Burkes Pass, Fairlie, Kimbell, Lake Tekapo, Twizel, Geraldine, Pleasant Point, Kurow, and Waimate.

In the 1972 electoral redistribution, the southern boundary shifted slightly north, and Kurow and Waimate transferred to the Oamaru electorate. In the 1977 electoral redistribution, South Canterbury was abolished. Its area was roughly evenly split between the Ashburton electorate, which moved south again, and the reconstituted Waitaki electorate.

== History ==
Rob Talbot had since the 1966 election been the representative of the Ashburton electorate for the National Party. When the South Canterbury electorate was formed in 1969, he transferred to there. With the abolition of the South Canterbury electorate in 1978 after three parliamentary terms, Talbot transferred back to the Ashburton electorate.

=== Members of Parliament ===
Key National

Election	Winner
1969 election	Rob Talbot
1972 election	Rob Talbot
1975 election	Rob Talbot
(Electorate abolished 1978; see Ashburton and Waitaki)

== Election results ==
=== 1975 election ===
1975 general election: South Canterbury
Party	Candidate	Votes	%	±%
National	Rob Talbot	11,217	56.4	+3.4
Labour	Neville Lambert	6,916	34.7	
Social Credit	Ian Dow	1,142	5.7	
Values	Thomas Clarkson	629	3.2	
Majority		4,301	21.7	+9.8
Turnout		22,797	87.5	−3.3

=== 1972 election ===
1972 general election: South Canterbury
Party	Candidate	Votes	%	±%
National	Rob Talbot	9,056	53.0	+3.8
Labour	David Braithwaite	7,021	41.1	
Social Credit	John Julius	782	4.6	
New Democratic	Maurice Hayes	220	1.3	
Majority		2,035	11.9	+3.7
Turnout		18,900	90.8	−1.4

=== 1969 election ===
1969 general election: South Canterbury
Party	Candidate	Votes	%	±%
National	Rob Talbot	7,362	49.2	
Labour	Maurice Austin Cameron	6,147	41.0	
Social Credit	Alfred William Barwood	1,469	9.8	
Majority		1,215	8.2	
Turnout		16,498	91.2	
