= Steve Watene =

Former United States international rugby league footballer

Personal information
- Born: unknown

Playing information
- Position: Second-row
Club
| Years | Team | Pld | T | G | FG | P |
|---|---|---|---|---|---|---|
| 1999 | Wakefield Trinity Wildcats | 1 | 0 | 0 | 0 | 0 |
Representative
| Years | Team | Pld | T | G | FG | P |
| 2000 | United States | 3 | 0 | 0 | 0 | 0 |

Steve Watene (birth unknown) is a former professional rugby league footballer who played in the 1990s. He played at club level for Wakefield Trinity Wildcats.

== Playing career ==
Watene made his début for Wakefield Trinity Wildcats during 1999's Super League IV.
