= Warren Cooper =

New Zealand politician

The Honourable Warren Cooper CNZM JP
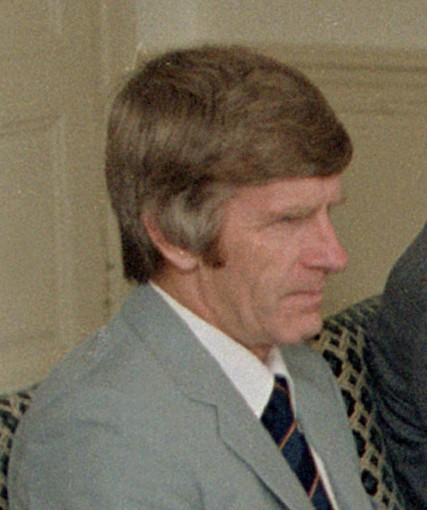
- Warren Cooper as Minister of Foreign Affairs, during a meeting with Caspar Weinberger at the Pentagon in 1983

31st Minister of Defence
- In office 2 November 1990 – 1 March 1996
- Prime Minister: Jim Bolger
- Preceded by: Peter Tapsell
- Succeeded by: Paul East

19th Minister of Foreign Affairs
- In office 11 December 1981 – 26 July 1984
- Prime Minister: Robert Muldoon
- Preceded by: Brian Talboys
- Succeeded by: David Lange

47th Postmaster-General
- In office 22 August 1980 – 11 December 1981
- Prime Minister: Robert Muldoon
- Preceded by: Ben Couch
- Succeeded by: John Falloon

22nd Minister of Tourism
- In office 13 December 1978 – 12 February 1981
- Prime Minister: Robert Muldoon
- Preceded by: Harry Lapwood
- Succeeded by: Derek Quigley

Member of the New Zealand Parliament for Otago Central Otago (1975–1978)
- In office 29 November 1975 – 12 October 1996
- Preceded by: Ian Quigley
- Succeeded by: Gavan Herlihy

Personal details
- Born: 21 February 1933 (age 93) Dunedin, New Zealand
- Party: National

Warren Ernest Cooper (born 21 February 1933) is a former New Zealand politician. He was a National Party MP from 1975 to 1996, holding cabinet positions including Minister of Foreign Affairs and Minister of Defence. Cooper also twice served as Mayor of Queenstown, from 1968 to 1975 and 1995 to 2001.

== Early life and career ==
Cooper was born in Dunedin in 1933. He received his education at Musselburgh School and King's High School. He later moved to Queenstown after leaving school at 15. He worked as a retailer, a painting, decorating and signwriting contractor, and a motel manager. He then became a real estate agent and was a leading member of the Jaycees, being awarded with life membership.

== Political career ==
New Zealand Parliament
Years	Term	Electorate	Party
1975–1978	38th	Otago Central	National
1978–1981	39th	Otago	National
1981–1984	40th	Otago	National
1984–1987	41st	Otago	National
1987–1990	42nd	Otago	National
1990–1993	43rd	Otago	National
1993–1996	44th	Otago	National

Cooper was Mayor of Queenstown Borough from 1968 to 1975. As mayor Cooper successfully lobbied the then Minister of Finance Robert Muldoon to allow the Queenstown Borough Council to sell land in the Queenstown Hill Commonage in order to fund new water and sewerage schemes. He joined the National Party and was elected a member of the party's dominion council in 1973.

He was first elected to Parliament in the 1975 election as MP for Otago Central, defeating the newly elected Ian Quigley of the Labour Party. In the 1978 election, he successfully contested the replacement electorate Otago.

Just after the 1978 election, his ministerial career started. He was Minister of Tourism (1978–1981), Minister of Regional Development (1978–1981), Postmaster-General (1980–1981), and Minister of Broadcasting (1981). When Brian Talboys retired from Parliament in 1981, Cooper was appointed to replace him as Minister of Foreign Affairs; he held this position until the government of Robert Muldoon was defeated in 1984. He got along well with the now Prime Minister Muldoon despite having differing views on policy, Cooper describing Muldoon as a socialist while Muldoon thinking Cooper the caucus' chief private enterpriser (a label Cooper embraced).

After the governments defeat he was retained on the frontbench by Muldoon and was designated Shadow Minister of Foreign Affairs and Overseas Trade. He retained those portfolios for most of Jim McLay's brief tenure as National leader (1984–86) before being dropped from Foreign Affairs by McLay's successor Jim Bolger and instead given the Local Government, Regional Development and South Island Development portfolios. Following National's defeat in 1987 he had another portfolio shift, retaining only Overseas Trade while also gaining Transport. In a reshuffle in early 1990 he swapped the Transport portfolio for Tourism.

Later, in the government of Jim Bolger, Cooper served as Minister of Defence (1990–96), Minister of Local Government (1990-94) and Minister of Internal Affairs (1993–96). Cooper remained in Parliament until the 1996 election, when he stepped aside in favour of Gavan Herlihy.

He transitioned back to local-body politics and was Mayor of Queenstown-Lakes from 1995 to 2001. Still an MP and minister at the time of his election as mayor there was speculation he might resign from cabinet or parliament altogether but stated he would not do so unless asked to by Bolger. He was involved in a public disagreement over development with actor Sam Neill in 2000, over development in Queenstown. Cooper said he enjoyed the stoush with Neill (a known Labour Party supporter) who later gave him a case of "socialist chardonnay".

== Honours and awards ==
In 1977, Cooper was awarded the Queen Elizabeth II Silver Jubilee Medal, and in 1990 he received the New Zealand 1990 Commemoration Medal. In the 1997 New Year Honours, Cooper was appointed a Companion of the New Zealand Order of Merit, for public services.

== Personal life ==
Cooper and his wife Lorraine have five children. His future wife had been employed at a hotel in Queenstown owned by his father. They married in Brisbane in 1956.

== Notes ==
Political offices
Preceded by Peter Tapsell	Minister of Defence; 1990–1996	Succeeded by Paul East
Preceded by Brian Talboys	Minister of Foreign Affairs; 1981–1984	Succeeded by David Lange
Preceded by Ben Couch	Postmaster-General; 1980–1981	Succeeded by John Falloon
Preceded by Harry Lapwood	Minister of Tourism; 1978–1981	Succeeded by Derek Quigley
New Zealand Parliament
Preceded by Ian Quigley	Member of Parliament for Otago Central; 1975–1978	Constituency abolished
New constituency	Member of Parliament for Otago; 1978–1996	Succeeded by Gavan Herlihy
