= Alf Allen (New Zealand politician) =

New Zealand politician

The Honourable Alf Allen CMG
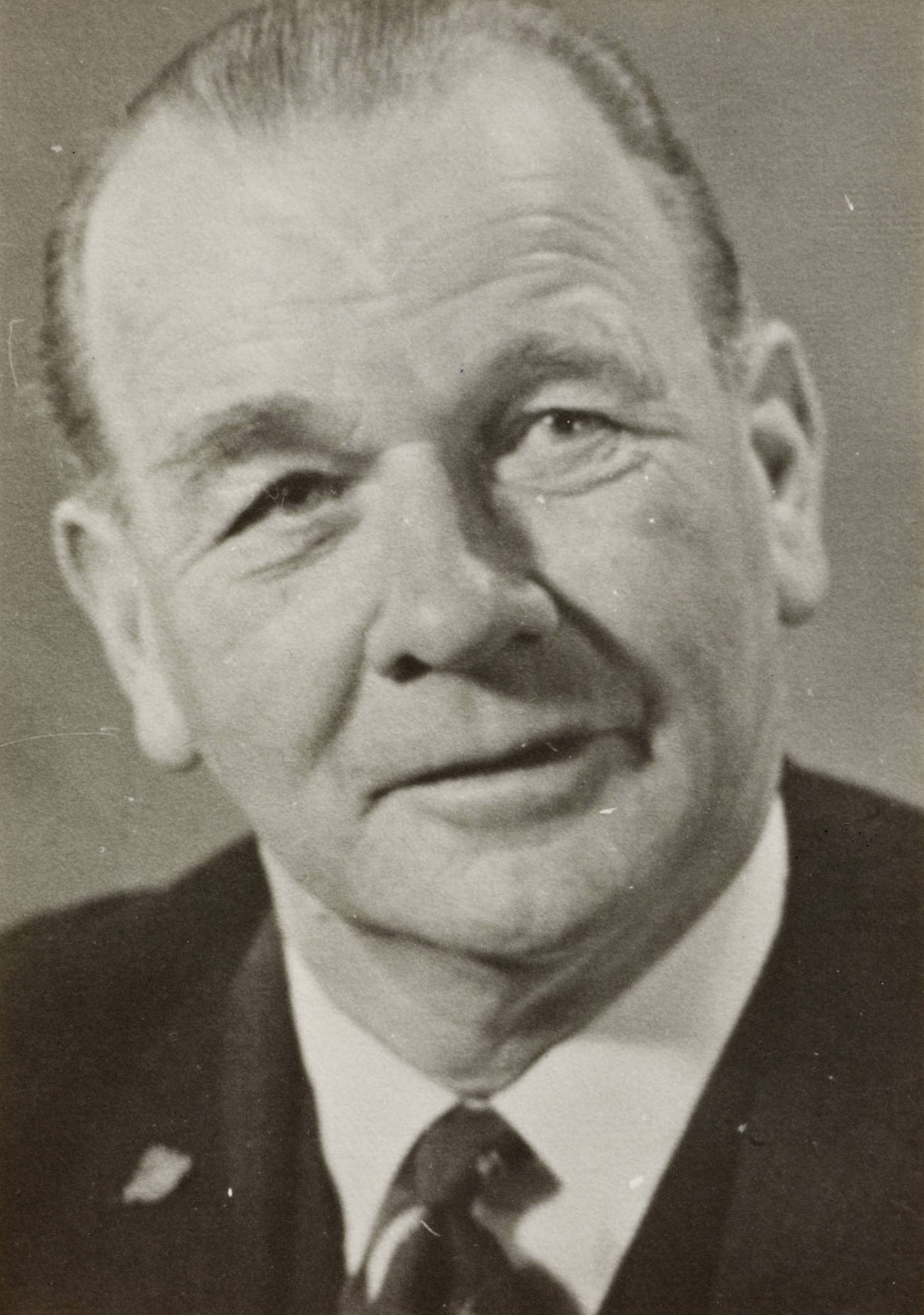

17th Speaker of the House of Representatives
- In office 7 June 1972 – 26 October 1972
- Prime Minister: Jack Marshall
- Preceded by: Roy Jack
- Succeeded by: Stan Whitehead

27th Chairman of Committees
- In office 13 March 1970 – 7 June 1972
- Preceded by: Jack George
- Succeeded by: Richard Harrison

Member of the New Zealand Parliament for Franklin
- In office 30 November 1957 – 26 October 1972
- Preceded by: Jack Massey
- Succeeded by: Bill Birch

Personal details
- Born: Alfred Ernest Allen; 20 May 1912 Onehunga, New Zealand
- Died: 9 March 1987 (aged 74) New Zealand
- Party: National
- Other political affiliations: Democratic Labour Party

Alfred Ernest Allen CMG (20 May 1912 – 9 March 1987) was a New Zealand politician of the National Party. In 1972, he was the seventeenth Speaker of the House of Representatives.

== Biography ==
New Zealand Parliament
Years	Term	Electorate	Party
1957–1960	32nd	Franklin	National
1960–1963	33rd	Franklin	National
1963–1966	34th	Franklin	National
1966–1969	35th	Franklin	National
1969–1972	36th	Franklin	National

Allen was born in Onehunga, Auckland, in 1912, and baptised in the Onehunga Presbyterian parish on 28 July of that year. He attended a variety of primary schools in the Bay of Plenty, Franklin and Auckland. After attending Auckland Grammar School, he became a farmer; he would own farms in Port Albert on the Kaipara Harbour, Maramarua in the Waikato, and Clevedon in the Franklin District. He married Nancy Cutfield in 1935. They had one son and three daughters. In World War II he served in the 2nd New Zealand Expeditionary Force from 1940 to 1943; he was a sergeant major.

He unsuccessfully stood as the Hamilton candidate for breakaway Labour MP John A. Lee and his Democratic Labour Party in the 1943 general election. Of four candidates, he came a distant third with less than 6% of the votes.

He was the National Member of Parliament for Franklin from 1957 (when the veteran sitting MP Jack Massey was deselected by the National Party in favour of Allen) to 1972, when he retired. He was Chairman of Committees from 13 March 1970 until 7 June 1972, the first day of the third session of the 36th Parliament, when he was elected Speaker of the House of Representatives. He was appointed a Companion of the Order of St Michael and St George in the 1973 New Year Honours. He died on 9 March 1987.

== Notes ==
New Zealand Parliament
Preceded by Jack Massey	Member of Parliament for Franklin; 1957–1972	Succeeded by Bill Birch
Political offices
Preceded by Jack George	Chairman of Committees of the House of Representatives; 1970–1972	Succeeded by Richard Harrison
Preceded by Roy Jack	Speaker of the New Zealand House of Representatives; 1972	Succeeded by Stan Whitehead
