= 1969 New Zealand general election =

General election in New Zealand

- 29 November 1969

84 seats in the Parliament 43 seats needed for a majority
- Turnout: 1,340,168 (88.94%) ▲
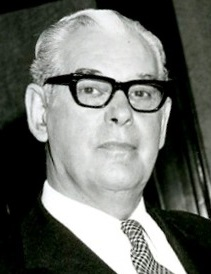

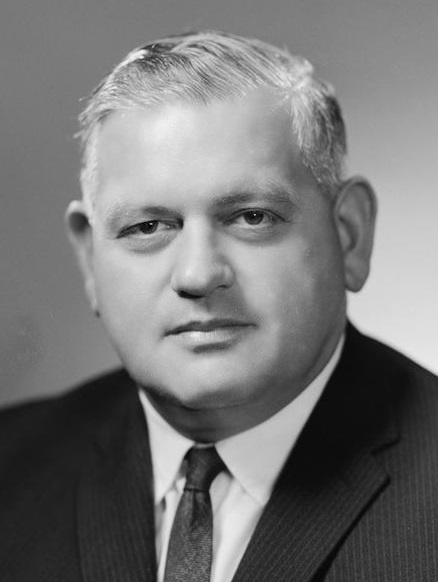
	First party	Second party
Leader	Keith Holyoake	Norman Kirk
Party	National	Labour
Leader since	13 August 1957	9 December 1965
Leader's seat	Pahiatua	Lyttelton
Last election	44 seats, 43.6%	35 seats, 41.4%
Seats won	45	39
Seat change	▲1	▲4
Popular vote	605,960	592,055
Percentage	45.2%	44.2%
Swing	▲1.6%	▲2.8%
- Results by electorate, shaded by winning margin
Prime Minister before election
Keith Holyoake
National
Subsequent Prime Minister
Keith Holyoake
National

The 1969 New Zealand general election was a nationwide vote to determine the shape of Parliament's 36th term. It saw the Second National Government headed by Prime Minister Keith Holyoake of the National Party win a fourth consecutive term. This is the most recent election where an incumbent government won a fourth term in office.

== 1967 electoral redistribution ==
Through an amendment in the Electoral Act in 1965, the number of electorates in the South Island was fixed at 25, an increase of one since the 1962 electoral redistribution. It was accepted that through the more rapid population growth in the North Island, the number of its electorates would continue to increase, and to keep proportionality, three new electorates were allowed for in the 1967 electoral redistribution for the next election. In the North Island, five electorates were newly created (Birkenhead, Hamilton West, Henderson, Mangere, and Western Hutt) and one electorate was reconstituted (Waikato) while three electorates were abolished (Hamilton, Waipa, and Waitakere). In the South Island, three electorates were newly created (Papanui, South Canterbury, and Wigram) and one electorate was reconstituted (Oamaru) while three electorates were abolished (Ashburton, Fendalton, and Waitaki). The overall effect of the required changes was highly disruptive to existing electorates, with all but three electorates (Franklin, Wairarapa, and St Kilda) having their boundaries altered. These changes came into effect with the 1969 election.

The increase to 84 electorates was the first since the 1902 electoral distribution. Due to the fixed number of South Island electorates, the number of North Island electorates has increased in every subsequent election until the introduction of mixed-member proportional representation (MMP) for the 1996 election, which fixed the number of seats at 120.

=== MPs retiring in 1969 ===
Four National MPs and five Labour MPs intended to retire at the end of the 35th Parliament.

Party	Name	Electorate
National	Gordon Grieve	Awarua
National	Arthur Kinsella	Hauraki
National	Jack George	Otago Central
National	Jack Scott	Rodney
Labour	Robert Macfarlane	Christchurch Central
Labour	Ritchie Macdonald	Grey Lynn
Labour	Arnold Nordmeyer	Island Bay
Labour	Mabel Howard	Sydenham
Labour	Iriaka Rātana	Western Maori

Sir Walter Nash MP for Hutt had announced he would retire at the end of the term in 1969, but he died on 4 June 1968 triggering a by-election instead.

== Election ==
The election was held on 29 November. Turnout was 88.94%. The total number of MPs had increased to 84, with at least 3 of the 4 new seats likely Labour seats. 55 and 25 electorates were in the North Island and South Island, respectively, plus the 4 Māori electorates.

== Results ==
National pulled off a cliff-hanger victory. National won 45 seats, and Labour won 39 seats, though Labour's share of the vote was only 1% behind National. The Social Credit Party lost its only seat in Parliament: Hobson, formerly held by then party leader Vernon Cracknell.

Despite the hopes of a reinvigorated Labour party under Norman Kirk, Labour was overconfident, started too late, and did not win in Auckland. Relations with the Federation of Labour and the unions were not good, and an industrial dispute on the ship Wainui cost Labour three Auckland seats according to Kirk. Labour MP Warren Freer personally believed that "had it not been for the seamen's strike during the election period, we could have won".

In Eden, Labour was first on election night but lost when special votes were counted.

Election results
Party	Candidates	Total votes	Percentage	Seats won	Change
National	84	605,960	45.2	45	+1
Labour	84	592,055	44.2	39	+4
Social Credit	84	121,576	9.1	0	−1
Country Party	15	6,715	0.5	0	±0
Communist	4	418	0.03	0	±0
Independents	36	8,457	0.6	0	±0
Total	303	1,340,168		84	

=== Votes summary ===
Popular Vote
National	45.20%
Labour	44.20%
Social Credit	9.10%
Country	0.50%
Independents	0.60%
Others	0.4%

Parliament seats
National	53.57%
Labour	46.43%

The table below shows the results of the 1969 general election:

Key

National Labour Social Credit Independent

Electorate results for the 1969 New Zealand general election
Electorate	Incumbent	Winner	Majority	Runner up
General electorates
Ashburton	Colin McLachlan		2,590	John Srhoy
Auckland Central	Norman Douglas		1,124	Clive Edwards
Avon	John Mathison		5,600	Alistair Ansell
Awarua	Gordon Grieve	Hugh Templeton	906	Aubrey Begg
Bay of Plenty	Percy Allen		3,440	Barry Kelly
Birkenhead	New electorate	Norman King	1,701	Don McKinnon
Buller	Bill Rowling		2,822	Ernie King
Christchurch Central	Robert Macfarlane	Bruce Barclay	3,406	Colin Knight
Clutha	Peter Gordon		3,618	Les McKay
Dunedin Central	Brian MacDonell		3,949	Margaret Mary Reichwein
Dunedin North	Ethel McMillan		2,929	Iona Williams
Eden	John Rae		67	Keith Sinclair (Note: Sinclair was first on election night for Eden (by 35 votes), but lost when special votes were included)
Egmont	Venn Young		4,280	Tom McGreevy
Franklin	Alfred E. Allen		5,495	Tai Tuhimata
Gisborne	Esme Tombleson		781	Trevor Davey
Grey Lynn	Ritchie Macdonald	Eddie Isbey	2,915	Jens Meder
Hamilton West	New electorate	Leslie Munro	1,878	Bob Reese
Hastings	Duncan MacIntyre		706	Richard Mayson
Hauraki	Arthur Kinsella	Leo Schultz	2,121	Dorothy Jelicich
Hawkes Bay	Richard Harrison		3,416	David Butcher
Henderson	New electorate	Martyn Finlay	3,295	Adrian Clarke
Heretaunga	Ron Bailey		1,375	Ralph Miller
Hobson	Vernon Cracknell	Logan Sloane	1,252	Vernon Cracknell
Hutt	Trevor Young		1,775	Don Lee
Invercargill	Ralph Hanan	John Chewings	1,031	Trevor Young
Island Bay	Arnold Nordmeyer	Gerald O'Brien	1,348	Fairlie Curry
Karori	Jack Marshall		6,226	Roy Tombs
Lyttelton	Norman Kirk	Tom McGuigan	292	Peter de Latour
Manawatu	Les Gandar		1,323	Ernie Hemmingsen
Mangere	New electorate	Colin Moyle	4,588	Neville Charles Slater
Manukau	Colin Moyle	Roger Douglas	875	Ronald Alfred Walden
Manurewa	Phil Amos		1,371	Pat Baker
Marlborough	Tom Shand		2,460	Ian Brooks
Marsden	Don McKay		1,101	Murray Smith
Miramar	Bill Young		1,789	Charles Troughton
Mt Albert	Warren Freer		2,837	Gavin Downie
Napier	Gordon Christie		1,970	Terry Dunleavy
Nelson	Stan Whitehead		1,248	Roy McLennan
New Lynn	Jonathan Hunt		3,600	Vic Watson
New Plymouth	Ron Barclay		1,000	Brian Clark
North Shore	George Gair		3,964	Donald Frederick Dugdale
Oamaru	New electorate	Allan Dick	497	N Agnew
Onehunga	Hugh Watt		4,539	Daphne Double
Otago Central	Jack George	Murray Rose	1,086	Brian Griffiths
Otaki	Allan McCready		2,037	John Scott
Pahiatua	Keith Holyoake		4,920	Trevor de Cleene
Pakuranga	Bob Tizard		1,253	Noel Holmes
Palmerston North	Joe Walding		161	Gordon Cruden
Papanui	New electorate	Bert Walker	2,096	Martin Hobby
Petone	Fraser Colman		3,450	Francis Joshua Handy
Piako	Jack Luxton		4,426	George Bryant
Porirua	Henry May	Gerry Wall	2,744	Paul William Mitchell
Raglan	Douglas Carter		593	Dudley Sinclair
Rangiora	Lorrie Pickering		1,143	Paul Piesse
Rangitikei	Norman Shelton		4,214	Dan Duggan
Remuera	Allan Highet		7,097	Hamish Keith
Riccarton	Mick Connelly	Eric Holland	2,939	Alan C. McEwen
Rodney	Jack Scott	Peter Wilkinson	2,832	Nevern McConachy
Roskill	Arthur Faulkner		3,296	Anthony Cook
Rotorua	Harry Lapwood		1,198	Charles Bennett
St Albans	Bert Walker	Roger Drayton	909	Ian Wilson
St Kilda	Bill Fraser		3,795	Lloyd George Anderson
South Canterbury	New electorate	Rob Talbot	1,215	Maurice Austin Cameron
Stratford	David Thomson		4,158	Lindsay Hugh Stockbridge
Sydenham	Mabel Howard	Norman Kirk	6,026	Peter Morrissey
Tamaki	Robert Muldoon		6,088	Alfred David Bolton
Taupo	Rona Stevenson		107	Jack Ingram
Tauranga	George Walsh		2,704	Ray Dillon
Timaru	Sir Basil Arthur		3,101	Dave Walker
Waikato	New electorate	Lance Adams-Schneider	3,408	Alfred Ernest George
Waimarino	Roy Jack		2,213	Shaun Alex Cameron
Wairarapa	Haddon Donald	Jack Williams	467	Haddon Donald
Waitemata	Norman King	Frank Gill	1,052	Michael Bassett
Waitomo	David Seath		5,674	Neil Roger David Shewan
Wallace	Brian Talboys		4,532	J Robson
Wanganui	George Spooner	Bill Tolhurst	959	George Spooner
Wellington Central	Dan Riddiford		2,200	Olive Smuts-Kennedy
Western Hutt	New electorate	Henry May	1,421	Egan E Ogier
Westland	Paddy Blanchfield		1,879	Barry Dallas
Wigram	New electorate	Mick Connelly	3,200	Dick Dawson
Māori electorates
Eastern Maori	Paraone Reweti		3,487	Henare Ngata
Northern Maori	Matiu Rata		4,758	Graham Latimer
Southern Maori	Whetu Tirikatene-Sullivan		6,630	Norra Woodbane Pomare
Western Maori	Iriaka Rātana	Koro Wētere	7,530	P J Hura

Table footnotes:
