= 31st New Zealand Parliament =

Term of the Parliament of New Zealand

31st Parliament of New Zealand
| ← | 30th Parliament | 32nd Parliament | → |
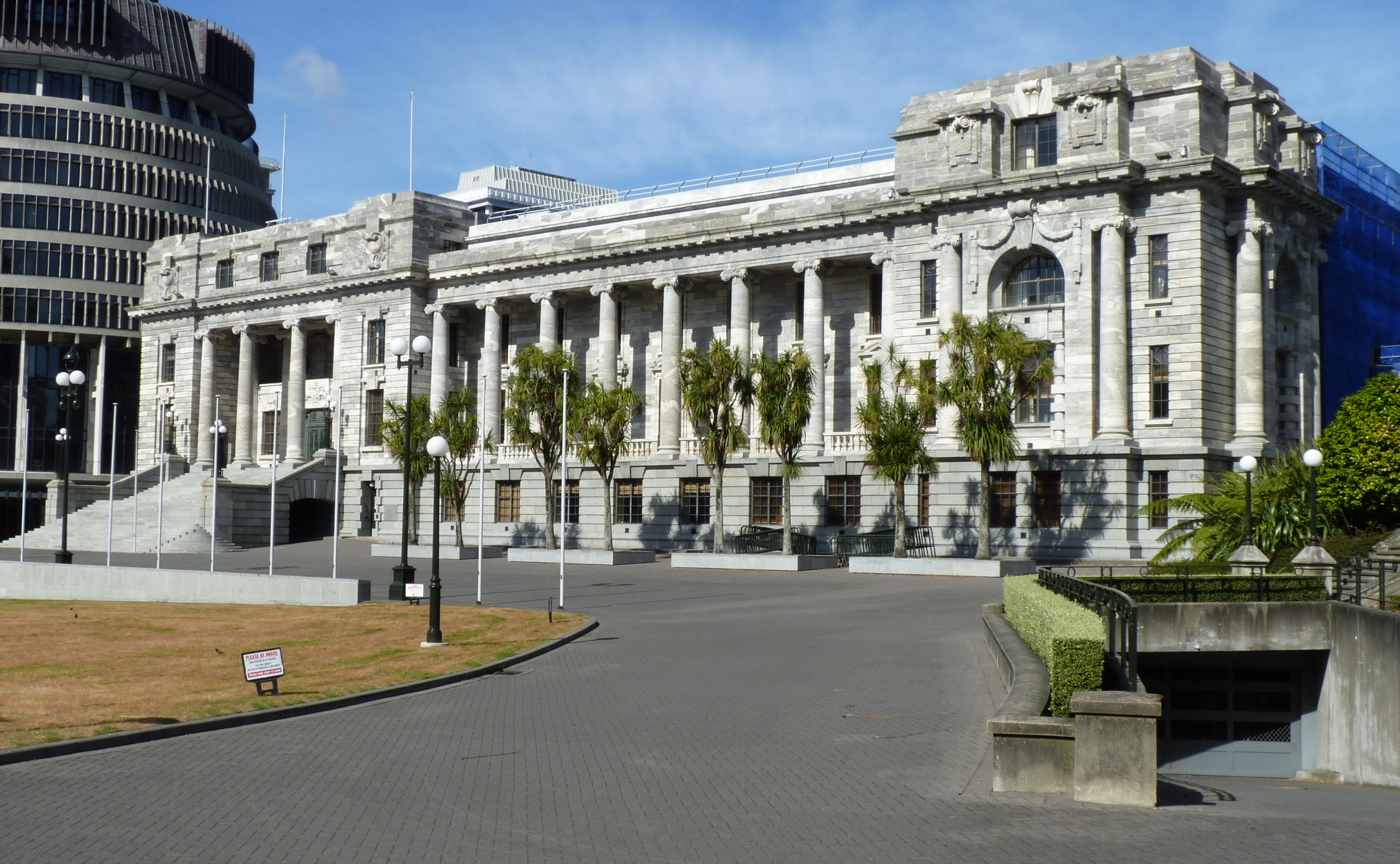
- Parliament House, Wellington

Overview
- Legislative body: New Zealand Parliament
- Term: 22 March 1955 – 25 October 1957
- Election: 1954 New Zealand general election
- Government: First National Government

House of Representatives
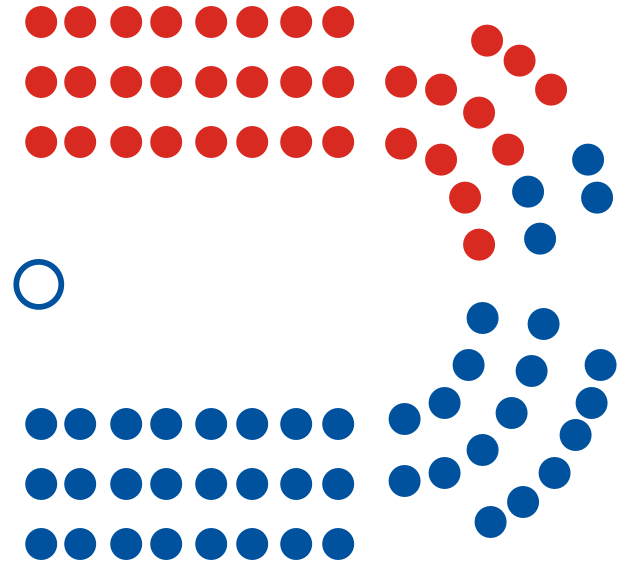
- Members: 80
- Speaker of the House: Matthew Oram
- Prime Minister: Keith Holyoake — Sidney Holland until 20 September 1957
- Leader of the Opposition: Walter Nash

Sovereign
- Monarch: HM Elizabeth II
- Governor-General: HE Lt. Gen. The Lord Norrie

The 31st New Zealand Parliament was a term of the New Zealand Parliament. It was elected at the 1954 general election on 13 November of that year.

== 1954 general election ==
The 1954 general election was held on Saturday, 13 November. A total of 80 MPs were elected; 50 represented North Island electorates, 26 represented South Island electorates, and the remaining four represented Māori electorates; this was a gain of one electorate for the North Island from the South Island since the 1951 election. 1,209,670 voters were enrolled and the official turnout at the election was 91.4%.

== Sessions ==
The 31st Parliament sat for three sessions, and was prorogued on 25 October 1957.

| Session | Opened | Adjourned |
|---|---|---|
| first | 22 March 1955 | 28 October 1955 |
| second | 4 April 1956 | 26 October 1956 |
| third | 11 June 1957 | 25 October 1957 |

== Ministries ==
The National Party under Sidney Holland had been in power since the 1949 election, and Holland remained in charge until 1957, when he stepped down due to ill health in September 1957 some two months prior to the 1957 election. Holland was succeeded by Keith Holyoake, but the Labour Party narrowly defeated National at the 1957 election, and the government changed in mid-December of that year.

== Overview of seats ==
The table below shows the number of MPs in each party following the 1954 election and at dissolution:

| Affiliation | Members | |
| Affiliation | At 1954 election | At dissolution |
|---|---|---|
| National Government | 45 | 45 |
| Labour Opposition | 35 | 35 |
| Total | 80 | 80 |
| Working Government majority | 10 | 10 |

Notes

- The Working Government majority is calculated as all Government MPs less all other parties.

== Initial composition of the 31st Parliament ==
The table below shows the results of the 1954 general election:

Key

National Labour Independent Social Credit

Electorate results for the 1954 New Zealand general election
| Electorate | Incumbent | Winner | Majority | Runner up |
|---|---|---|---|---|
General electorates
| Ashburton | Geoff Gerard | | 2,292 | George Glassey |
| Auckland Central | Bill Anderton | | 4,093 | John Weir Stewart |
| Avon | John Mathison | | 4,955 | Arthur Norman Stone |
| Awarua | George Herron | | 3,172 | J P Wyatt |
| Bay of Plenty | Bill Sullivan | | 3,062 | Godfrey Santon |
| Buller | Jerry Skinner | | 3,348 | Derisly Manwell Carson |
| Central Otago | William Bodkin | Jack George | 2,074 | Peter John Scott |
| Christchurch Central | Robert Macfarlane | | 3,395 | Oliver G. Moody |
| Clutha | James Roy | | 1,490 | T A Rodgers |
| Dunedin Central | Phil Connolly | | 330 | Marcus Anderson |
| Dunedin North | Ethel McMillan | | 2,791 | Helen Black |
| Eden | Wilfred Fortune | Duncan Rae | 8 | John Stewart (Note: John Stewart was first on election night, but lost when special votes were included) |
| Egmont | Ernest Corbett | | 2,977 | Roy Evans |
| Fendalton | Sidney Holland | | 3,004 | Roy Henry McDonald |
| Franklin | Jack Massey | | 4,587 | Percival Peacock |
| Gisborne | Harry Dudfield | Reginald Keeling | 521 | Harry Dudfield |
| Grey Lynn | Fred Hackett | | 4,807 | Tom McGowan |
| Hamilton | Hilda Ross | | 1,430 | Ben Waters |
| Hastings | Sydney Jones | Ted Keating | 252 | Sydney Jones |
| Hauraki | Andy Sutherland | Arthur Kinsella | 2,659 | Brevat William Dynes |
| Hawkes Bay | Cyril Harker | | 3,109 | A Stafford |
| Heretaunga | New electorate | Phil Holloway | 5,058 | Allan McCready |
| Hobson | Sidney Smith | | 2,584 | Cecil William Elvidge |
| Hurunui | William Gillespie | | 2,395 | Norman Kirk |
| Hutt | Walter Nash | | 3,681 | Clevedon Costello |
| Invercargill | Ralph Hanan | | 943 | William Denham |
| Island Bay | Robert McKeen | Arnold Nordmeyer | 3,824 | John Maurice Whitta |
| Karori | Charles Bowden | Jack Marshall | 1,811 | Jim Bateman |
| Lyttelton | Harry Lake | | 24 | Tom McGuigan (Note: Tom McGuigan was first on election night, but lost when special votes were included) |
| Manawatu | Matthew Oram | | 2,228 | Patrick Kelliher |
| Manukau | New electorate | Leon Götz | 3,072 | Cyril Stamp |
| Marlborough | Tom Shand | | 1,635 | George Allan Turner |
| Marsden | Alfred Murdoch | Don McKay | 872 | Mervyn Allan Hosking (Note: National deselected the sitting MP (Alfred Murdoch) (q.v.) in favour of William Vallance; then Vallance had tax problems and was replaced by Don McKay. When Vallance ran as an independent candidate, the vote-splitting almost cost National the seat.) |
| Miramar | Bob Semple | Bill Fox | 1,527 | Robert John McConnell |
| Mornington | Wally Hudson | | 3,886 | Walter MacDougall |
| Mt Albert | Warren Freer | | 3,226 | Robert Muldoon |
| Napier | Peter Tait | Jim Edwards | 720 | Peter Tait |
| Nelson | Edgar Neale | | 717 | Stan Whitehead |
| New Plymouth | Ernest Aderman | | 1,178 | Clarence Robert Parker |
| North Shore | Dean Eyre | | 1,395 | Arthur Faulkner |
| Oamaru | Thomas Hayman | | 1,358 | J H Rapson |
| Onehunga | Hugh Watt | | 4,389 | Alfred E. Allen |
| Onslow | Henry May | | 519 | Wilfred Fortune |
| Otahuhu | Leon Götz | James Deas | 1,806 | Leonard Bradley |
| Otaki | Jimmy Maher | | 963 | Ernie Langford |
| Pahiatua | Keith Holyoake | | 3,519 | Ronald Bell |
| Palmerston North | Blair Tennent | Philip Skoglund | 346 | Blair Tennant |
| Patea | William Sheat | Roy Jack | 662 | Benjamin Winchcombe |
| Petone | Mick Moohan | | 4,211 | Fanny Elizabeth Soward |
| Ponsonby | Ritchie Macdonald | | 3,948 | Harold Barry |
| Raglan | Hallyburton Johnstone | | 857 | James Harrison Wilson |
| Rangitikei | Edward Gordon | Norman Shelton | 2,679 | Stephen Malcolm Roberton |
| Remuera | Ronald Algie | | 3,544 | Bob Tizard |
| Riccarton | Angus McLagan | | 4,343 | Balfour Grieve Dingwall |
| Rodney | Clifton Webb | Jack Scott | 3,270 | Arthur Hellyn |
| Roskill | John Rae | | 1,652 | Elizabeth Morris |
| Rotorua | New electorate | Ray Boord | 822 | Percy Allen |
| St Albans | Jack Watts | | 608 | Mick Connelly |
| St Kilda | Jim Barnes | | 114 | Fred Jones |
| Selwyn | John McAlpine | | 2,521 | Daniel Clinton |
| Stratford | New electorate | Thomas Murray | 2,966 | Brian Edgar Richmond |
| Sydenham | Mabel Howard | | 5,560 | Alma Schumacher |
| Tamaki | Eric Halstead | | 1,986 | Pat Curran |
| Tauranga | George Walsh | | 3,448 | Oliver Liddell |
| Timaru | Clyde Carr | | 1,423 | Vic Wilson |
| Waikato | Geoffrey Sim | | 4,698 | Albert Clifford Tucker |
| Waimate | (vacant) (Note: David Campbell Kidd, the National Party MP for Waimate, died less than two months before the election, leaving his seat vacant.) | Alfred Davey | 1,438 | Neville Pickering |
| Waipa | New electorate | Stan Goosman | 4,435 | Harold Francis Gallagher |
| Wairarapa | Bert Cooksley | | 1,691 | Bob Wilkie |
| Waitakere | Rex Mason | | 3,424 | Jim McAllister |
| Waitemata | New electorate | Norman King | 387 | Hubert Morrison |
| Waitomo | Walter Broadfoot | David Seath | 1,480 | Vic Haines |
| Wallace | Tom Macdonald | | 4,466 | J W Cleary |
| Wanganui | Joe Cotterill | | 305 | Jack Rumbold |
| Wellington Central | Charles Chapman | Frank Kitts | 627 | Allan Highet |
| Westland | Jim Kent | | 3,605 | Mark Wallace |
Māori electorates
| Eastern Maori | Tiaki Omana | | 3,094 | Claude Anaru |
| Northern Maori | Tapihana Paikea | | 4,435 | Tono Waetford |
| Southern Maori | Eruera Tirikatene | | 2,864 | Turi Carroll |
| Western Maori | Iriaka Rātana | | 6,637 | William Rakeipoho Bennett |

Table footnotes

== By-elections during 31st Parliament ==
There were a number of changes during the term of the 31st Parliament.

| Electorate and by-election | | Date | Incumbent | Cause | Winner |
|---|---|---|---|---|---|
| Riccarton | 1956 | 27 October | Angus McLagan | Death | Mick Connelly |
| Bay of Plenty | 1957 | 6 April | Bill Sullivan | Resignation | Percy Allen |
