= Mount Albert by-election =

Mount Albert by-election may refer to several by-elections in the history of the Mount Albert electorate.

- Mount Albert by-election, 1947
- Mount Albert by-election, 2009
- Mount Albert by-election, 2017
