= 1947 Mount Albert by-election =

New Zealand by-election

← 1946 general	24 September 1947	1949 general →

The Mount Albert seat in the House of Representatives. Election by simple majority using first-past-the-post voting.
- Turnout: 12,943 (87.09%)
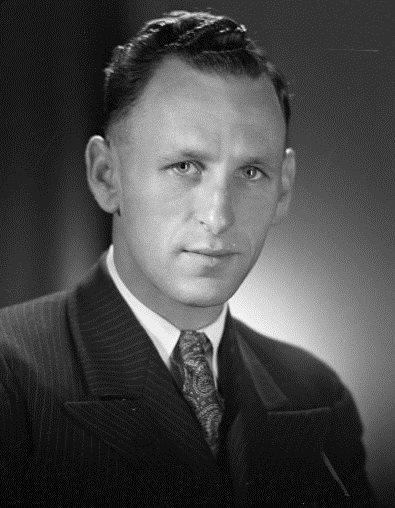

Candidate	Warren Freer	Jack Garland
Party	Labour	National
Popular vote	7,235	5,682
Percentage	56.01%	43.99%
Member before election
Arthur Richards
Labour
Elected Member
Warren Freer
Labour

The 1947 Mount Albert by-election was a by-election held during the 28th New Zealand Parliament in the Auckland electorate of Mount Albert. The by-election occurred following the death of MP Arthur Richards and was won by Warren Freer.

== Background ==
Arthur Richards, who was first elected to represent Roskill for the Labour Party in 1931, died on 5 August 1947. This triggered the Mount Albert by-election, which occurred on 24 September 1947. Warren Freer was the candidate for the Labour Party, and Jack Garland was the candidate for the National Party.

== Candidates ==
Labour
There were nine nominees for the Labour Party candidacy who included:

- Alex Dixon, a former RNZAF pilot and Labour's candidate for Rodney in 1946.
- James Freeman, vice-president of the Timber Workers' Union and Labour's candidate for Remuera in 1946.
- Warren Freer, secretary of the Auckland Labour Representation Committee and Labour's candidate for Eden in 1946.
- Bill Schramm former MP for Auckland East and Speaker who was defeated in Parnell in 1946.

The decision was deferred to the Labour Party's national executive. Freer was only 26 and relatively unknown to executive members, but local member Dick Barter convinced party leader Peter Fraser that his candidacy in Eden was adequate apprenticeship. He was eventually selected. Richards had urged Freer to stand for the safe Labour seat of Mt Albert when he died.

National
The National Party had five nominations which were:

- Alfred Thomas Dow, secretary of the Auckland Provincial School Committees' Association and a former member of the Mount Eden Borough Council.
- Peter Collingwood Fisher, of Hamilton, a wounded RNZAF officer, who served in Britain.
- Jack Garland, a former member of the Auckland City Council and a candidate for the council at the next municipal elections.
- Leon Götz, National candidate for Auckland Central in 1946.
- Joan Rattray, a member of the Auckland City Council and the Metropolitan Youth Council.

Garland was chosen after winning a ballot of local members.

== Campaign ==
Freer recalled two inspiring campaign speeches delivered by Martyn Finlay and Mabel Howard which were received well by voters.

== Previous election ==
1946 general election: Mount Albert
Party	Candidate	Votes	%	±%
Labour	Arthur Richards	7,681	56.88	
National	Frederick Ashley Hosking	5,824	43.12	
Informal votes		74	0.54	
Majority		1,857	13.75	
Turnout		13,579	94.47	
Registered electors		14,374		

== Results ==
The following table gives the election results:

1947 Mount Albert by-election
Party	Candidate	Votes	%	±%
Labour	Warren Freer	7,235	56.01	
National	Jack Garland	5,682	43.99	
Majority		1,553	12.02	
Informal votes		26	0.20	−0.34
Turnout		12,943	87.09	−7.38
Registered electors		14,861		
Labour hold		Swing		

Freer obtained 56% of the votes and was successful. Freer was staggered when his majority was close to that of Richards in 1946, rather than being well below (as for most by-elections). At the November local-body elections Garland was elected a member of the Auckland City Council.

Freer would hold the Mount Albert electorate for more than three decades until he retired at the 1981 election.

== See also ==
- List of New Zealand by-elections
- 2009 Mount Albert by-election
- 2017 Mount Albert by-election
