= Frank Langstone =

New Zealand politician (1881–1969)

The Honourable Frank Langstone
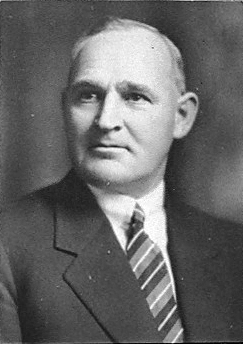

9th Minister of External Affairs
- In office 1 April 1940 – 21 December 1942
- Prime Minister: Peter Fraser
- Preceded by: Michael Joseph Savage
- Succeeded by: Peter Fraser

25th Minister of Native Affairs
- In office 1 April 1940 – 21 December 1942
- Prime Minister: Peter Fraser
- Preceded by: Michael Joseph Savage
- Succeeded by: Rex Mason

30th Minister of Lands
- In office 6 December 1935 – 21 December 1942
- Prime Minister: Michael Joseph Savage; Peter Fraser
- Preceded by: Alfred Ransom
- Succeeded by: Jim Barclay

11th President of the Labour Party
- In office 18 April 1933 – 3 April 1934
- Vice President: Clyde Carr
- Leader: Michael Joseph Savage
- Preceded by: Rex Mason
- Succeeded by: Tim Armstrong

Member of the New Zealand Parliament for Roskill
- In office 27 November 1946 – 30 November 1949
- Preceded by: Arthur Richards
- Succeeded by: John Rae

Member of the New Zealand Parliament for Waimarino
- In office 14 November 1928 – 27 November 1946
- Preceded by: Robert Smith
- Succeeded by: Paddy Kearins
- In office 7 December 1922 – 4 November 1925
- Preceded by: Robert Smith
- Succeeded by: Robert Smith

Personal details
- Born: 10 December 1881 Bulls, New Zealand
- Died: 15 June 1969 (aged 88) Auckland, New Zealand
- Party: Labour (1916–1949)
- Other political affiliations: Social Credit (1957–1969)
- Spouses: Agnes King (m. 1906; died 1946) Mollie Nolan (m. 1952)
- Children: 7
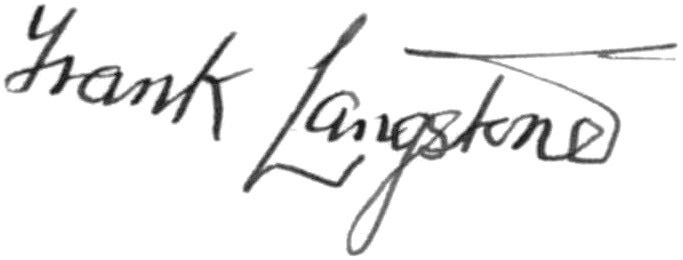
- Signature

Frank Langstone (10 December 1881 – 15 June 1969) was a New Zealand Member of Parliament, Cabinet Minister and high commissioner to Canada.

== Biography ==
=== Early life ===
Langstone was born in Bulls probably on 10 December 1881. He was the fourth of five children to Charles Walter Langston, a vet, Margaret McDermott, a seamstress. His father abandoned the family and not long after his mother died on 23 December 1890. His older sister Katherine took care of the family, thus financial pressures prevented him having a proper education, though he was an extensive reader. Eventually he went into foster care where he continued self educating himself before he became an apprentice blacksmith.

In around 1906 Langstone moved to Masterton where he became the proprietor of the refreshment rooms at the railway depot, and later ran a billiard saloon. On 24 April 1906 he married Agnes Clementine King, they had five sons and two daughters. He was involved with setting up the left-wing Maoriland Worker newspaper in 1910.

He later became a shearer and was involved in the Wellington branch of the New Zealand Shearers' Union before moving to Te Kūiti, in the King Country in 1913 to run a local restaurant. He briefly lived in Auckland before returning to Te Kūiti in 1918 to become the proprietor of a railway restaurant in Taumarunui, and a fish-and-chip shop in 1919. After joining the Shearers' Union Langstone became politically active, joining the first Labour Party in 1910 and then the Social Democratic Party (SDP) from 1913, of which he was president of the Te Kuti branch. He was a foundation member of the Labour Party in 1916 after it absorbed the SDP.

=== Political career ===
New Zealand Parliament
Years	Term	Electorate	Party
1922–1925	21st	Waimarino	Labour
1928–1931	23rd	Waimarino	Labour
1931–1935	24th	Waimarino	Labour
1935–1938	25th	Waimarino	Labour
1938–1943	26th	Waimarino	Labour
1943–1946	27th	Waimarino	Labour
1946–1949	28th	Roskill	Labour

==== Member of Parliament ====
Langstone first contested the Waimarino electorate in the 1919 election, but was beaten by the incumbent, Robert William Smith of the Liberal Party. Langstone and Smith contested Waimarino at the 1922 election and this time, Langstone was successful.

Throughout his parliamentary career Langstone consistently advocated for the creation of a state-owned bank, development of lands for agriculture, a financial safety net for farmers. He held the electorate until 1925 when he was defeated, returning to the Taumarunui restaurant, which Agnes managed during his time in Parliament. In 1926 he was unsuccessful in seeking the Labour nomination for the Eden by-election. He won back Waimarino in 1928, this time holding it until 1946. He then switched to the Auckland electorate of Roskill from 1946 to 1949.

Langstone was President of the New Zealand Labour Party from 1933 to 1934. During this time he became influenced by the Social Credit ideas of C. H. Douglas, which were to form the basis of all his subsequent party policy ideas. In 1935, he was awarded the King George V Silver Jubilee Medal.

He was described as "a cheerful, shortish extrovert with a better brain than most people thought he had". As he was deaf, he was allowed to listen to debates in the chamber on a small radio with headphones. When a dull back-bencher was on, he was known to tune into livelier commercial stations, when he would beat time to the music with his hands. Langstone was an impressive orator, as adept at Robert Semple and John A. Lee at engaging with the public. Despite this, his pursuit of ideas and views (particularly on financial matters) which were not shared by his more senior colleagues prevented him being appointed to more influential roles.

==== Cabinet Minister ====
He was appointed Minister of Lands and Commissioner of State Forests from 1935 to 1942 by Michael Joseph Savage during the First Labour Government. He impressed senior civil servants with his administrative abilities and had particular concerns regarding soil erosion, river control and afforestation.

When Peter Fraser succeeded Savage, he appointed Langstone Minister of External Affairs, Native Minister and Minister for the Cook Islands from 1940 to 1942. In April 1942 Fraser appointed him New Zealand's first High Commissioner to Canada. He returned after only six months later, he resigned from cabinet and publicly alleged that Fraser had double-crossed him after promising him the position of Minister to the United States which was given to Walter Nash instead. In September 1943 The Evening Post newspaper claimed that Langstone had been recalled because of serious misconduct. Langstone sued the paper for libel and was awarded £200 in damages in February 1944.

After the expulsion of John A. Lee, Langstone became recognised as the leading voice of the radical wing of the Labour Party. Consequently, he missed election to cabinet after the 1946 election. He also opposed New Zealand joining the International Monetary Fund. In 1947 Langstone proposed that the government make the state-owned Bank of New Zealand the sole legal issuer of bank credit over loans and overdrafts in an attempt to secure state control over the means of exchange. The proposal was contentious, only three other Labour MPs openly supported the idea, and was rejected as too radical however.

==== Split from Labour ====
In 1949 Langstone resigned from the Labour Party over the issue of peacetime conscription. Later that year he stood in the Roskill electorate as an independent but was defeated; coming third with 1097 votes after John Rae (National, 7372 votes) and James Freeman (Labour, 5957 votes). During the 1951 New Zealand waterfront dispute he published a pamphlet opposing the heavy-handed emergency regulations imposed by the First National Government. In both the 1957 and 1960 general elections he stood for Social Credit in Roskill. At the Riccarton by-election in 1956 he made several speeches in support of the Social Credit candidate Wilfrid Owen.

=== Later life and death ===
Agnes died on 5 August 1946 and he remarried in Auckland on 11 January 1952 Frank to Catherine Mary "Mollie" Nolan.

Langstone died of a heart attack on 15 June 1969 in Auckland, survived by Mollie, and three sons and two daughters from his first marriage. His ashes were buried at Purewa Cemetery, Auckland.

== Notes ==
Political offices
Preceded by Michael Joseph Savage	Minister of External Affairs; 1940–1942	Succeeded by Peter Fraser
Preceded by Michael Joseph Savage	Minister of Native Affairs; 1940–1942	Succeeded by Rex Mason
Preceded by Alfred Ransom	Minister of Lands; 1935–1942	Succeeded by Jim Barclay
Preceded by Alfred Ransom	Commissioner of State Forests; 1935–1942	Succeeded by Jim Barclay
New Zealand Parliament
Preceded by Robert William Smith	Member of Parliament for Waimarino; 1922–1925 1928–1946	Succeeded by Robert William Smith
Preceded by Robert William Smith	Member of Parliament for Waimarino; 1922–1925 1928–1946	Succeeded by Paddy Kearins
Preceded by Arthur Shapton Richards	Member of Parliament for Roskill; 1946–1949	Succeeded by John Rae
Party political offices
Preceded by Bill Jordan	President of the Labour Party; 1933–1934	Succeeded by Tim Armstrong
Diplomatic posts
New title	High Commissioner to Canada; 1942	Succeeded by Robert M. Firth
