= Warren Freer =

New Zealand politician

The Honourable Warren Freer QSO
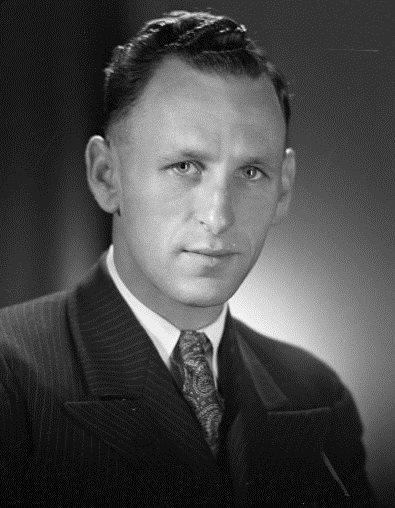
- Freer in 1947

2nd Minister of Trade and Industry
- In office 8 December 1972 – 12 December 1975
- Prime Minister: Norman Kirk; Bill Rowling
- Preceded by: Brian Talboys
- Succeeded by: Lance Adams-Schneider

1st Minister of Energy Resources
- In office 8 December 1972 – 12 December 1975
- Prime Minister: Norman Kirk; Bill Rowling
- Succeeded by: Eric Holland

Member of the New Zealand Parliament for Mount Albert
- In office 24 September 1947 – 28 November 1981
- Preceded by: Arthur Shapton Richards
- Succeeded by: Helen Clark

Personal details
- Born: Warren Wilfred Freer; 27 December 1920 Sandringham, Auckland, New Zealand
- Died: 29 March 2013 (aged 92) Noosa, Queensland, Australia
- Party: Labour Party
- Children: 2

Warren Wilfred Freer QSO (27 December 1920 – 29 March 2013) was a New Zealand politician and member of the Labour Party. He represented the Mount Albert electorate from 1947 to 1981. He is internationally known as the first Western politician to ever visit the People's Republic of China after its creation in 1949.

== Early life ==
Freer was born in 1920. His parents, Charles and May Freer had lived in Waihi during the Waihi miners' strike in 1913 and had to leave the town. They married in 1914 in Remuera.

He attended Royal Oak Primary School in Auckland. During the early days of the Great Depression he was embarrassed to be the only one of his class not bare-footed, so used to take off his shoes and socks on the way to school and replace them before getting home. Michael Joseph Savage frequently went to the Freer home for Sunday roasts. On his 13th birthday, Freer received a present from Savage, a copy of Edward Bellamy's novel Looking Backward, which he "devoured and cherished".

As a school boy at Auckland Grammar School, Freer suffered a spinal injury, and he subsequently did not join the war. He initially worked as a shop assistant at Milne and Choice, a large Queen Street department store, but moved to journalism.

On 9 May 1941, Freer married Sylvia Prudence Squire at the Epsom Methodist Church in Auckland, and the couple went on to have two children.

== Member of Parliament ==
New Zealand Parliament
Years	Term	Electorate	Party
1947–1949	28th	Mount Albert	Labour
1949–1951	29th	Mount Albert	Labour
1951–1954	30th	Mount Albert	Labour
1954–1957	31st	Mount Albert	Labour
1957–1960	32nd	Mount Albert	Labour
1960–1963	33rd	Mount Albert	Labour
1963–1966	34th	Mount Albert	Labour
1966–1969	35th	Mount Albert	Labour
1969–1972	36th	Mount Albert	Labour
1972–1975	37th	Mount Albert	Labour
1975–1978	38th	Mount Albert	Labour
1978–1981	39th	Mount Albert	Labour

Freer stood unsuccessfully in the 1946 election for the "hopeless" (for Labour) Eden electorate. He was then asked to stand for the Mount Albert electorate in a 1947 by-election, which he won. Freer was only 26 when he entered Parliament following the death of Arthur Richards, and was relatively unknown to Labour executive members, but local supporter Dick Barter convinced Peter Fraser that his work in Eden was adequate apprenticeship. Freer represented the Mount Albert electorate for 34 years. He chose not to seek re-election at the 1981 election, and was succeeded by Helen Clark.

=== 1950s ===
In 1955 he was the first Western politician to visit the People's Republic of China, against the wishes of Labour leader Walter Nash but with the encouragement of National Prime Minister Sidney Holland. After Labour won the 1957 election, Freer stood for a cabinet seat in the Second Labour Government led by Nash. In the third ballot for the final seat he was tied with Auckland Central MP Bill Anderton. Freer cast his own vote in the next ballot for the 66 year old Anderton, thinking that at 36 he had plenty of time to make it in to cabinet. Retrospectively, Freer regretted the decision as Labour spent the following four terms in opposition. During the Nash government he was chairman of the public accounts select committee which considered to matters relating to the finances of the government.

In March 1959 Freer was quoted in the tabloid newspaper New Zealand Truth as having stated "See Phil, and Phil will fix it" to Henry Judd, an émigré importer, insinuating Freer was informing Judd that the Minister of Industries and Commerce Phil Holloway (who was in charge of import controls) could grant him an ease-of-passage remedy for controlled imports. The incident became a libel case (Truth (NZ) Ltd v Holloway) in which Holloway was awarded NZ£11,000 in damages and a further NZ£800 in costs.

=== 1960s ===
Freer, alongside Bill Fox and Mick Moohan, was one of the few senior Labour MPs who helped propel Norman Kirk to Labour's leadership by ensuring he had the numbers to successfully challenge Nordmeyer in 1965. From then on he became a close confidant of Kirk. As a reward he was promoted to the frontbench as Shadow Minister of Industries and Commerce and Shadow Minister of Customs.

=== 1970s ===
He was a cabinet minister in the Third Labour Government of 1972–1975, holding the portfolios of Trade and Industry and Minister of Energy Resources. He was ranked third in cabinet and served as acting Prime Minister three times, and was "appalled" by the amount of paper Kirk was given to read, with "international secrets" that he could read in that week's Time. On the first occasion, Kirk congratulated him that there were no industrial disputes and that he had not gone to war against anyone. As Minister of Energy Resources he held negotiations with the private sector over the development of the Maui gas field (a natural gas condensate and oil field) which was the largest single infrastructure undertaking in New Zealand's history. In 1974 he instituted a Maximum Retail Price (MRP) scheme as part of the governments attempts to control price increases. The MRP scheme, which prescribed maximum prices for retail goods, was not successful as it was highly bureaucratic and easily evaded by retailers. Despite its lack of success Freer proposed reviving the scheme in 1975 despite the public view that it was ineffective.

He stood as a candidate for the deputy leadership of the New Zealand Labour Party in 1974 after Kirk's death only to prevent Arthur Faulkner winning on the first ballot, hoping that either Bob Tizard or Colin Moyle would win the subsequent ballot(s). He lost on the third ballot. Initially he had no intention of standing, and preferred Tizard (who won). In 1975 the government passed the Commerce Act that consolidated the laws on commercial competition, price controls, monopolies and takeovers.

After Labour were defeated in 1975, Freer retained the Trade and Industry portfolio in opposition. From 1977 to 1978 he was additionally Shadow Minister of Foreign Affairs and Overseas Trade. Following Labour's 1978 defeat Freer became Shadow Minister of Regional Development and Tourism until December 1979 when, impending retirement, he opted not to stand for re-election to the Shadow Cabinet. Freer was replaced in the safe Mount Albert seat by Helen Clark who beat six other contenders including electorate chairman Keith Elliot, former MP Malcolm Douglas and future MP Jack Elder for the nomination. Freer's preferred successor was Elliot.

== Later life and death ==
In 1982, Freer was appointed a justice of the peace.

He went into business with a prawn farming venture, the $5.2 million Kiwi China Prawn Company in Kaipara. In April 1988 it collapsed, which he attributed to the technology of his Chinese partners being out of date at the time. However he later bought the company's property and assets together with partners. The relaunched company imported salt-water king prawns from Hong Kong, which went into quarantine on his farm under Ministry of Agriculture and Fisheries (MAF) supervision taking advantage of a prohibition being lifted on importing Chinese prawns in 1989. The first "kiwi" prawns were to be bred in late 1990. In 1991 he joined the board of Contra-Shear Holdings, a company that designed and manufactured waste water screening systems.

In 1996, Freer moved to Noosa on the Sunshine Coast in Australia. His first wife died in 2003; they had been married for 62 years. His second marriage was to Joyce. Freer died on 29 March 2013 after a long illness. He was survived by his two sons from his first marriage, and by his second wife.

== Honours and awards ==
In 1953, Freer was awarded the Queen Elizabeth II Coronation Medal, and in 1977 he received the Queen Elizabeth II Silver Jubilee Medal. In the 1987 Queen's Birthday Honours, he was appointed a Companion of the Queen's Service Order for public services. In 1990, he was awarded the New Zealand 1990 Commemoration Medal.

Warren Freer Park, in the Auckland suburb of Sandringham, is named for him.

== Notes ==
New Zealand Parliament
Preceded by Arthur Shapton Richards	Member of Parliament for Mount Albert; 1947–1981	Succeeded by Helen Clark
Political offices
Preceded by Brian Talboys	Minister of Trade and Industry; 1972–1975	Succeeded by Lance Adams-Schneider
New title	Minister of Energy Resources; 1972–1975	Succeeded by Eric Holland
Honorary titles
Preceded by Keith Holyoake	Father of the House; 1977–1981	Succeeded by Mick Connelly
