= Arthur Faulkner =

New Zealand politician

The Honourable Arthur Faulkner
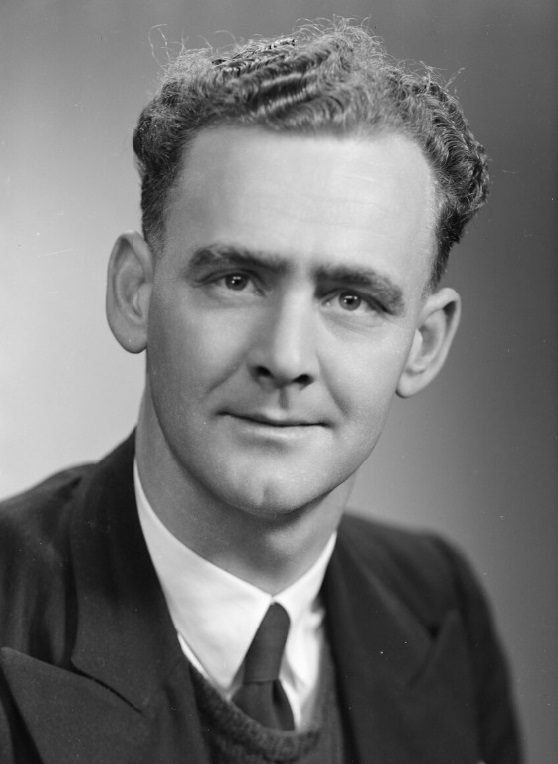

24th President of the Labour Party
- In office 11 May 1976 – 15 May 1979
- Vice President: Joe Walding
- Preceded by: Charles Bennett
- Succeeded by: Jim Anderton

25th Minister of Labour
- In office 10 September 1974 – 12 December 1975
- Prime Minister: Bill Rowling
- Preceded by: Hugh Watt
- Succeeded by: Peter Gordon

4th Minister of State Services
- In office 10 September 1974 – 12 December 1975
- Prime Minister: Bill Rowling
- Preceded by: Bob Tizard
- Succeeded by: Peter Gordon

26th Minister of Works
- In office 29 August 1974 – 10 September 1974
- Prime Minister: Norman Kirk
- Preceded by: Hugh Watt
- Succeeded by: Hugh Watt

25th Minister of Defence
- In office 8 December 1972 – 10 September 1974
- Prime Minister: Norman Kirk
- Preceded by: Allan McCready
- Succeeded by: Bill Fraser

Member of the New Zealand Parliament for Roskill
- In office 30 November 1957 – 28 November 1981
- Preceded by: John Rae
- Succeeded by: Phil Goff

Personal details
- Born: 20 November 1921 Devonport, New Zealand
- Died: 15 May 1985 (aged 63) Auckland, New Zealand
- Party: Labour
- Spouse: Peg Cox (married 1945)
- Children: 5

Arthur James Faulkner (20 November 1921 – 15 May 1985) was a New Zealand politician of the Labour Party.

== Early life and career ==
Faulkner was born in the Auckland suburb of Devonport in 1921. He was educated at Takanini School then Otahuhu District High School and after finishing his education he found employment as a sales clerk. At the age of 15 he joined the Labour Party and worked as a party organiser and later a branch secretary.

At the outbreak of World War II Faulkner joined the Royal New Zealand Air Force and became a fighter pilot. He saw action in both Europe and North Africa flying a Supermarine Spitfire. He showed his prowess as a fighter pilot by being the first Allied pilot to land at Anzio, Italy, when Allied forces fought their way ashore during Operation Shingle. After returning to New Zealand after the war he was employed as the credit manager of a furniture company.

== Political career ==
=== Member of Parliament ===
New Zealand Parliament
Years	Term	Electorate	Party
1957–1960	32nd	Roskill	Labour
1960–1963	33rd	Roskill	Labour
1963–1966	34th	Roskill	Labour
1966–1969	35th	Roskill	Labour
1969–1972	36th	Roskill	Labour
1972–1975	37th	Roskill	Labour
1975–1978	38th	Roskill	Labour
1978–1981	39th	Roskill	Labour

Faulkner stood unsuccessfully for the Franklin electorate in 1951 and the North Shore electorate in 1954. At the Bay of Plenty by-election in May 1957 he was Labour's campaign organiser.

He then stood for and won the Roskill electorate in 1957, and held the seat to 1981, when he retired. Faulkner was a backbencher during the government of Walter Nash before spending 12 years in opposition. During this period he spoke frequently on defence matters in the house and it was no surprise when Labour leader Norman Kirk designated Faulkner as Labour's defence spokesman in 1965. He was particularly critical of New Zealand's involvement in the Vietnam War. Earlier that year he stood unsuccessfully for the position of Kirk's deputy. He was beaten by the incumbent Hugh Watt by 24 votes to 8 with Norman Douglas receiving 2 votes.

When United States Vice President Spiro Agnew visited Wellington in mid-January 1970, Faulkner along with several other Labour Members of Parliament including Bob Tizard, Jonathan Hunt, and Martyn Finlay boycotted the state dinner to protest American policy in Vietnam. However, other Labour MPs including Opposition Leader Norman Kirk attended the function which dealt with the Nixon Doctrine.

=== Cabinet minister ===
He was a Cabinet Minister, and was appointed by Kirk as Minister of Defence from 1972 to 1974 in the Third Labour Government. Within days of being sworn in as a minister he ended New Zealand's compulsory military training scheme which fulfilled a key election campaign pledge by Labour. Faulkner strongly opposed New Zealand having sporting contact with South Africa during the Apartheid period and argued that the proposed 1973 Springbok tour should be cancelled. He told cabinet that he would resign rather than instruct troops to combat protesting civilians and that in any case the military was not trained to assist police in preserving civil order. The tour eventually did not go ahead. He was also briefly Minister of Works from August to September 1974. He was often called to serve in an acting role in other portfolios including lands, education, island affairs, agriculture and fisheries. He was particularly noted for his success in education and lands where he initiated the governments Ohu scheme of work groups for alternative communities in rural areas.

He stood a second time for deputy to Bill Rowling in 1974 following the death of Kirk. He was popular in caucus due to his amiable personality, but both chief whip Ron Barclay and senior minister Warren Freer saw him as indecisive and not leadership material. As Barclay learned that Faulkner could win on the first ballot, he got Freer to stand for deputy to split the vote. Bob Tizard, narrowly, won on the fourth ballot 28 votes to 26. In a surprise move, Rowling decided to remove Faulkner as Defence minister and instead appointed him as Minister of Labour instead. One of his strengths was his abilities as a conciliator, a talent which served him well in the Labour portfolio, deemed to be the most demanding job in the Third Labour Government. Rowling also appointed him Minister of State Services. Faulkner's critics suggested he was too ready to agree with all points of view but settle for none, whilst others thought he was skilled at reaching amicable agreements that never fully conceded to one side while still satisfying all parties. Those skills were underutilised in the defence portfolio but which led Rowling to shift his responsibilities.

=== Party president ===
Following the defeat of the government, he was elected President of the Labour Party in May 1976. As President he devoted his energies to rebuilding the party organisation. He was President of the party for three years until he stepped down and was succeeded by Jim Anderton, who had been defeated by Faulkner at the 1978 conference 693 votes to 422 for the presidency. As president he was successful in retaining party members whilst in opposition but was heavily criticised for his role in several messy candidate selections ahead of the 1978 election (particularly Papatoetoe and Island Bay).

In opposition again, Faulkner was appointed Shadow Minister of Labour and Employment by Rowling. Faulkner ran against first-time National Party politician John Banks in 1978. Banks believed Faulkner could be defeated, due to his narrow majority in 1975 and the newly redrawn electorate borders of Roskill, and campaigned full-time against him. Faulkner was successful in retaining his seat, however Labour was defeated again in 1978. Faulkner was made the Shadow Minister of Foreign Affairs and Defense, and in 1979 suffered health issues related to a gallstone. He was absent from Parliament for over a month and was relieved of some minor portfolio responsibilities by Rowling (electoral reform and accident compensation) to ease his recovery.

Faulkner came under increasing pressure to retire, primarily due to his age. He reluctantly decided not to stand again ahead of the 1981 election. Despite having privately discussed retiring with Rowling, his retirement announcement came as a surprise to media as he had already been selected by Labour to re-contest the seat for the next election. He clarified the late announcement by stating that he didn't want to give political opponents any indication to gear up their preparations to contest the seat. There was much speculation that Anderton would attempt to take his place in Roskill, but after a hostile reaction to the notion in caucus Anderton decided not to seek the Roskill nomination. He was eventually replaced by Phil Goff. Faulkner's final act in Parliament was to move the Gleneagles Agreement Bill which appropriately reflected his career long opposition to Apartheid.

== Later life and death ==
In October 1984 he was appointed as a member of the board of Air New Zealand by the Fourth Labour Government.

Faulkner died on 15 May 1985 at his home in Auckland, aged 63. He was survived by his wife and five children. To honour his memory, Boat Bay in the suburb of Waikōwhai was renamed to Faulkner Bay.

== Personal life ==
He married May (Peg) Cox in 1945, and they had 2 sons and 3 daughters. Peg died in 2019.

== Notes ==
Party political offices
Preceded by Charles Bennett	President of the Labour Party; 1976–1979	Succeeded by Jim Anderton
Political offices
Preceded by Allan McCready	Minister of Defence; 1972–1974	Succeeded by Bill Fraser
Preceded by Hugh Watt	Minister of Works; 1974	Succeeded by Hugh Watt
Preceded by Hugh Watt	Minister of Labour; 1974–1975	Succeeded by Peter Gordon
Preceded by Bob Tizard	Minister of State Services; 1974–1975	Succeeded by Peter Gordon
New Zealand Parliament
Preceded by John Rae	Member of Parliament for Roskill; 1957–1981	Succeeded by Phil Goff
