= George Munns =

New Zealand politician

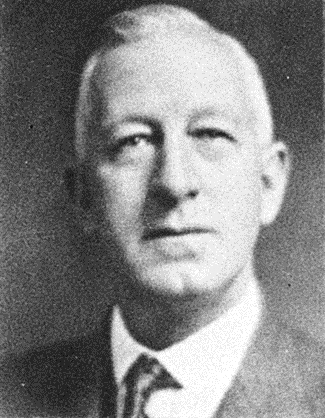

Member of the New Zealand Parliament for Roskill
- In office 14 November 1928 – 2 December 1931
- Preceded by: Vivian Potter
- Succeeded by: Arthur Shapton Richards

Personal details
- Born: 1877
- Died: 1954 (aged 76–77)
- Party: United

George Charles Munns (1877–1954) was a United Party Member of Parliament in New Zealand.

== Biography ==
=== Early life and career ===
George Munns was born in England in 1877 and later emigrated to New Zealand in 1892. He then took an interest in the mining business and became the chairman of directors of the Maoriland Mining Company.

=== Political career ===
New Zealand Parliament
Years	Term	Electorate	Party
1928–1931	23rd	Roskill	United

For seven years Munns was a member of the Gisborne Borough Council, including three years as the chairman of the council's works committee, and later he was a member of the Gisborne School Committee. After moving to Auckland he continued his interest in local politics and became President of the Roskill East Ratepayers' Association.

He won the Auckland electorate of Roskill in the 1928 general election, but in 1931 he was defeated by the Labour candidate Arthur Shapton Richards. In 1930 he became his party's senior Whip, serving in that capacity until his defeat.

== Notes ==
New Zealand Parliament
Preceded by Vivian Potter	Member of Parliament for Roskill; 1928–1931	Succeeded by Arthur Shapton Richards
Party political offices
Preceded by Alfred Murdoch	Senior Whip of the United Party; 1930–1931	Succeeded by Alfred Murdoch
