= Percy Allen (politician) =

New Zealand politician (1913–1992)

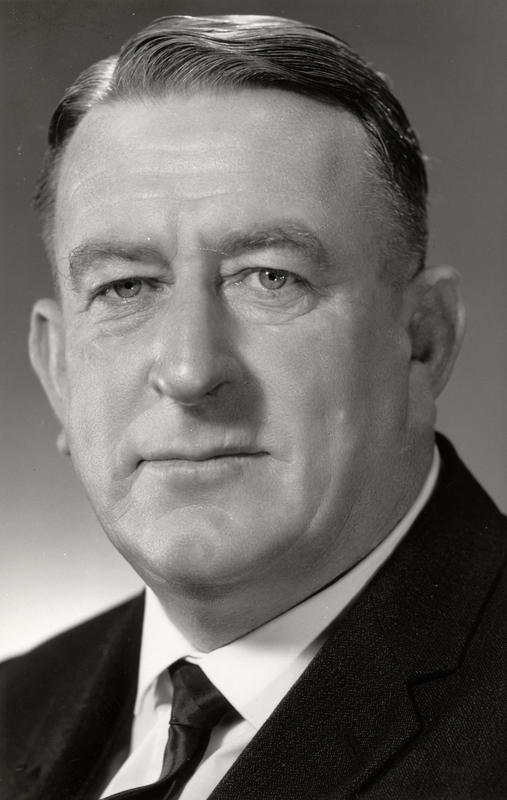
Allen c. 1950s

Percy Benjamin Allen QSO (30 June 1913 – 19 September 1992) was a New Zealand politician of the National Party.

== Biography ==
New Zealand Parliament
Years	Term	Electorate	Party
1957	31st	Bay of Plenty	National
1957–1960	32nd	Bay of Plenty	National
1960–1963	33rd	Bay of Plenty	National
1963–1966	34th	Bay of Plenty	National
1966–1969	35th	Bay of Plenty	National
1969–1972	36th	Bay of Plenty	National
1972–1975	37th	Bay of Plenty	National

Allen was born at Auckland in 1913, the son of Charles Percival Allen. He received his education at Te Aroha School and Rotorua Boys' High School. In 1939, he married Peggy Donaldson, the daughter of William Donaldson. They had one son and one daughter. He fished and played golf for recreation.

He participated in World War II and served in the Pacific, Italy and Egypt, where he was wounded at El Alamein. He had the rank of major at the end of the war. He had his own plastering business after the war.

Allen was on the Rotorua RSA and on the Rotorua Borough Council.

He represented the Bay of Plenty electorate in Parliament from 1957, when he won the 1957 by-election after the resignation of Bill Sullivan, until 1975, when he retired because of ill-health.

He was a Cabinet minister from 1963 to 1972 in the Second National Government. He was appointed as Minister of Works by Keith Holyoake on 20 December 1963, succeeding Stan Goosman, who had retired at the 1963 election. In 1969, he became Minister of Electricity. When Jack Marshall became Prime Minister in 1972, Allen maintained the Works portfolio, relinquished Electricity, but gained the role as Minister of Police. His ministerial roles finished when the Third Labour Government took over on 8 December 1972.

He was appointed a Companion of the Queen's Service Order for public services in the 1976 New Year Honours. and was awarded the New Zealand 1990 Commemoration Medal. He died in Whakatāne on 19 September 1992.

== Notes ==
New Zealand Parliament
Preceded by Bill Sullivan	Member of Parliament for Bay of Plenty; 1957–1975	Succeeded by Duncan MacIntyre
Political offices
Preceded by Dean Eyre	Minister of Police; 1963–1969; 1972	Succeeded by David Thomson
Preceded by David Thomson	Minister of Police; 1963–1969; 1972	Succeeded by Mick Connelly
