= Arthur Shapton Richards =

New Zealand politician (1877–1947)

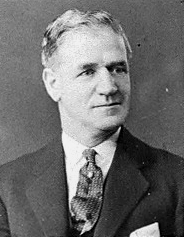

Member of the New Zealand Parliament for Mount Albert
- In office 27 November 1946 – 5 August 1947
- Preceded by: New constituency
- Succeeded by: Warren Freer

Member of the New Zealand Parliament for Roskill
- In office 2 December 1931 – 27 November 1946
- Preceded by: George Munns
- Succeeded by: Frank Langstone

Personal details
- Born: 1877 Reading, Berkshire, England
- Died: 5 August 1947 (aged 69–70) New Zealand
- Party: Labour
- Spouse: Elizabeth Warneford
- Children: 3

Arthur Shapton Richards (1877 – 5 August 1947) was a New Zealand politician of the Labour Party.

== Biography ==
=== Early life ===
He was born in Reading, Berkshire, England and came to New Zealand in 1894, first at Gisborne and then Poverty Bay where he worked on sheep farms. In 1903 he married Elizabeth Warneford. He briefly moved to Wanganui in 1908 where he founded Wanganui Branch of New Zealand Socialist Party before returning to Gisborne where he became President of East Coast Trades Council and was also Secretary of Gisborne Hotel Workers' Union from 1911 to 1917. He was Gisborne Drivers' Union delegate to the 1913 Unity Congress. In 1922 he moved to Auckland.

=== Political career ===
New Zealand Parliament
| Years | Term | Electorate | Party |
|---|---|---|---|
| 1931–1935 | 24th | Roskill | Labour |
| 1935–1938 | 25th | Roskill | Labour |
| 1938–1943 | 26th | Roskill | Labour |
| 1943–1946 | 27th | Roskill | Labour |
| 1946–1947 | 28th | Mount Albert | Labour |

Richards unsuccessfully stood for the Auckland City Council on a Labour ticket in the 1923 local elections.

He stood unsuccessfully in the Hamilton electorate in 1922, Marsden in 1925, and Roskill in 1928. He contested Roskill again at the subsequent general election in 1931 and this time, he was successful. He held Roskill until 1946, when he successfully transferred to the "safe" (for Labour) Mount Albert electorate in the 1946 general election.

Following an electoral redistribution the Roskill electorate remained, but 75% of its area became the new Mount Albert electorate. Consequently Richards thought that Mount Albert would be the more suitable electorate for him to represent. He won selection over Martyn Finlay, Tom Skinner and Frank Langstone (Langstone would in turn replace Richards in Roskill). He died in office on 5 August 1947. His death caused the 1947 by-election, which was won by Warren Freer.

He was the senior Government whip from 1942 until his death, and was succeeded in that position by his deputy, Robert Macfarlane.

He was awarded the King George V Silver Jubilee Medal in 1935.

=== Death ===
Richards died on 5 August 1947 after an illness extending over several weeks. He was survived by his wife, son and two daughters.

In recognition of Richards' work in establishing state housing in Mount Roskill, Auckland, the Arthur S Richards Memorial Park was named in his honour.

== Notes ==
New Zealand Parliament
| Preceded by George Munns | Member of Parliament for Roskill; 1931–1946 | Succeeded by Frank Langstone |
| New constituency | Member of Parliament for Mount Albert; 1946–1947 | Succeeded by Warren Freer |
Party political offices
| Preceded by James O'Brien | Senior Whip of the Labour Party; 1942–1947 | Succeeded by Robert Macfarlane |
