= New Zealand Liberal Federation =

- President: James Hill-Motion
- Founded: 8 May 1956
- Ideology: Classical Liberalism; Laissez-faire
- Political position: Centre-right
- Colours: Yellow

The New Zealand Liberal Federation was a laissez-faire Liberal Party that was formed to stand electoral candidates in the mid-1950s.

== History ==
The party was formed at a meeting in Lower Hutt on 8 May 1956 with the intention of standing candidates at the 1957 general election. The meeting was hosted by A. J. Pascoe who was a former executive member of the Social Credit Party before he had resigned from the party. Around 40 persons attended some from as far away as Palmerston North and Masterton including the provisional party president, James Hill-Motion. Pascoe said that the party was based partly on a modification of his own financial ideas and partly on "Seddon liberalism."

Soon after the party launched it decided against contesting the 1956 Riccarton by-election. The party's executive felt the party policy would not be finalised in time for the election date. At the 1957 Bay of Plenty by-election Reginald Joseph Pedley stood for the Liberal Federation. Hill-Motion stated that the party planned to use the by-election campaign to advertise its policies to New Zealanders. He also pushed back on jibes that his party were "dissenting Social Crediters" instead saying "We are dissenting Nationalists, but we see a danger for the country in socialism." Hill-Motion had been a Social Credit candidate for Manawatu in 1954, but regretted his nomination. The party did not perform well with Pedley only obtaining 4.26% of the vote and lost his deposit.

The Liberal Federation had several policy platforms it campaigned on:

- The reintroduction of the leasehold in perpetuity system of land tenure
- A reform of the financial system by permitting the trading banks to lend their assets and customers deposits
- Banning trading banks from creating credit
- Replacing the overdraft system with a system of long or short-term loans for definite periods
- No direct taxation on personal income
- Replacement of the old age pension with a national superannuation scheme with payments equaling the basic wage and not subject to a means test
- Primary producers given guaranteed prices based on a reasonable assessment of production costs with a fall in overseas prices carried by the government, and similarly, the government would take the profit of higher overseas prices
- Encouraging development of the manufacturing industry for exporting surplus production under a similar scheme to those proposed for primary products
- A special sales organisation to be established for all markets and potential markets in all parts of the world

At the 1957 general election only two Liberal Federation candidates stood. Pedley in Manawatu and John Duggan, the Mayor of Raetihi, in Patea. Both polled poorly with Pedley winning 124 votes (0.9%) and Duggan received 158 votes (1.2%). As late as November 1958 the party was intending to stand candidates at the 1960 general election, claiming there was dire need amongst the public for third parties.
