= 1981 New Zealand general election =

General election in New Zealand

- 28 November 1981

92 seats in the Parliament 47 seats needed for a majority
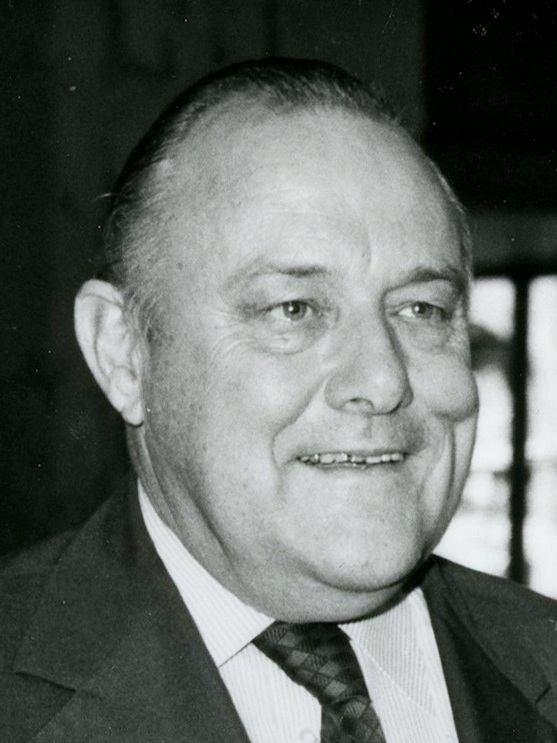

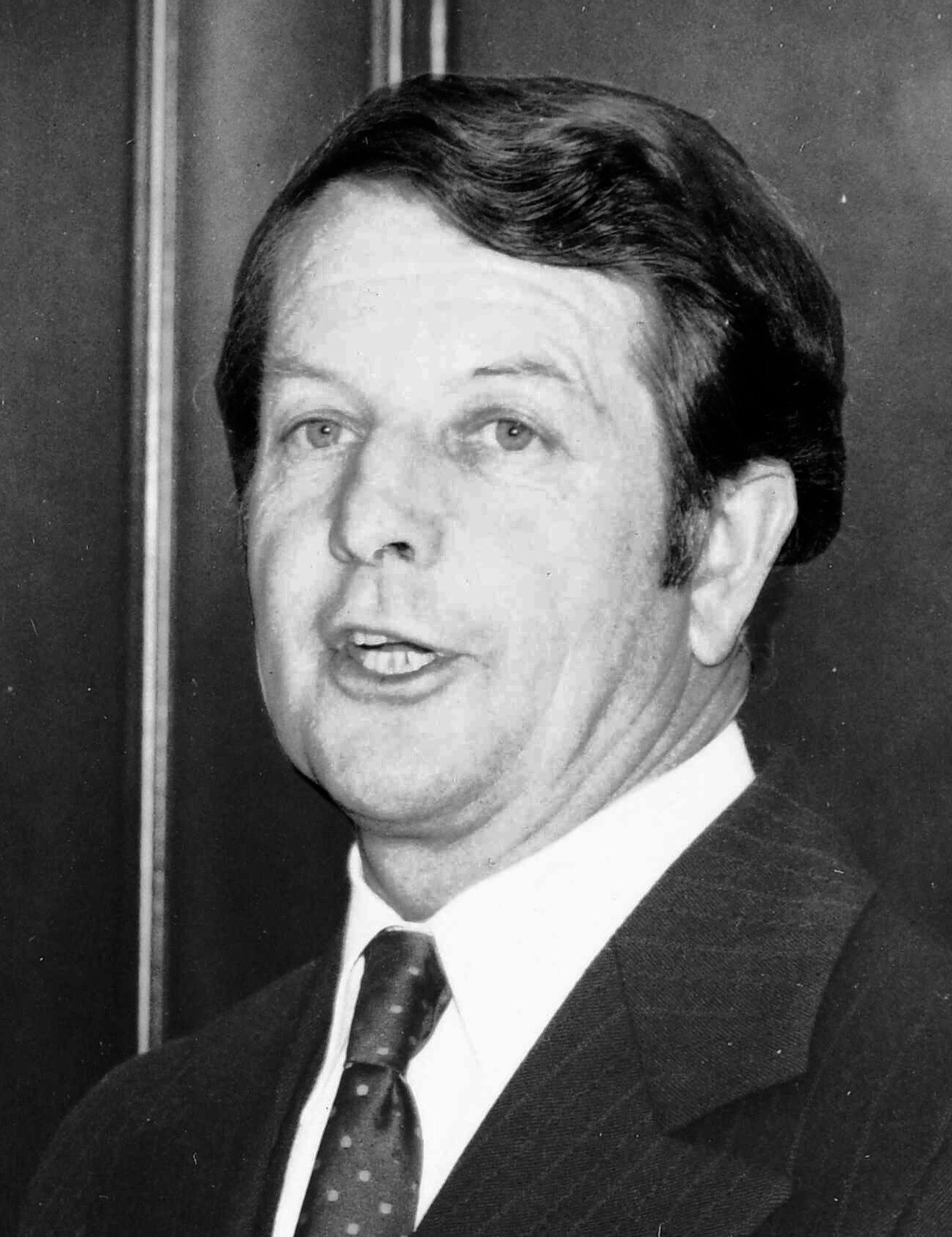

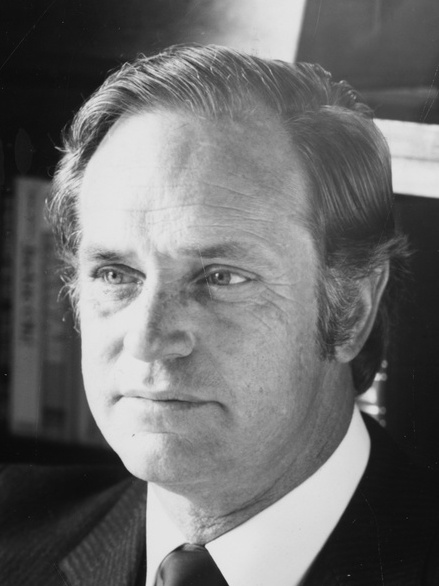
	First party	Second party	Third party
Leader	Robert Muldoon	Bill Rowling	Bruce Beetham
Party	National	Labour	Social Credit
Leader since	9 July 1974	6 September 1974	14 May 1972
Leader's seat	Tamaki	Tasman	Rangitīkei
Last election	51 seats, 39.8%	40 seats, 40.4%	1 seat, 16.1%
Seats before	50	40	2
Seats won	47	43	2
Seat change	▼3	▲3	Steady
Popular vote	698,508	702,630	372,056
Percentage	38.8%	39.0%	20.7%
Swing	▼1.0%	▼1.4%	▲4.6%
- Results by electorate, shaded by winning margin
Prime Minister before election
Robert Muldoon
National
Subsequent Prime Minister
Robert Muldoon
National

The 1981 New Zealand general election, held on 28 November 1981, was a nationwide vote to determine the shape of the 40th New Zealand Parliament. It saw the governing National Party, led by Robert Muldoon, win a third term in office, but the opposition Labour Party, led by Bill Rowling, won the largest share of the votes cast.

Social Credit also won over 20% of the vote – their best result ever – but received no new seats. This was also the highest ever vote a party other than Labour or National have ever received.

This was the second consecutive election in which National lost the popular vote to Labour. More electorates were rural and right-leaning than urban and progressive, and therefore National benefitted under the first-past-the-post electoral system. That the unpopular Muldoon was able to continue to govern was a major catalyst for the growing public desire to reform New Zealand's electoral system. This happened within fifteen years, when the 1996 election was the first to use mixed-member proportional representation.

Notable MPs first elected at this election include future Labour Party leader and mayor of Auckland Phil Goff, the first Māori Speaker of the House Peter Tapsell, future Finance Minister Michael Cullen, and future Prime Minister Helen Clark. Future Minister of Foreign Affairs and New Zealand First leader Winston Peters lost his seat of Hunua at this election to Colin Moyle of the Labour Party, whom Robert Muldoon had aggressively accused of being gay as part of a McCarthyist smear campaign in 1977.

== Background ==
Before the election, the National Party governed with 50 seats, while the opposition Labour Party held 40 seats. The Social Credit Party held two seats (one of which they took from National in a 1980 by-election). The National Party had won a landslide victory in the 1975 election, then lost ground in the 1978 election, but remained in government. The style of Robert Muldoon's leadership was growing increasingly unpopular, both with his party and with the public, and there had been an abortive leadership challenge by Brian Talboys in 1980. Some commentators believed that the 1981 election would mark an end to Muldoon's government.

The Labour Party was led by Bill Rowling, who had been leader of the party in the past two elections. While Rowling had performed poorly against Muldoon in 1975, and was generally viewed by the public as weak, he had gradually recovered a measure of public respect. In 1980, Rowling survived a leadership challenge by David Lange. In the 1978 election, Labour had won a plurality of the vote, but did not win a majority of the seats. Many believed that this time, Labour would manage to convert its support into seats, although that did prove not to be the case.

Not all of Muldoon's opponents gave their support to Rowling and the Labour Party, however. The small Social Credit Party, New Zealand's "third party", was enjoying strong support, although the first-past-the-post electoral system made it difficult for them to win seats. After the 1980 East Coast Bays by-election, Social Credit support rose as high as 30% in opinion polls, but then declined.

Some pundits have since claimed that the Springbok Tour increased votes for National in provincial electorates, despite the tour not being seen as a major election issue.

=== MPs retiring in 1981 ===
Five National MPs and seven Labour MPs intended to retire at the end of the 39th Parliament.

Party	Name	Electorate	Term of office	Date announced
National	Eric Holland	Fendalton	1967–81	17 March 1980
National	Leo Schultz	Hauraki	1969–81	22 April 1980
National	Colin McLachlan	Selwyn	1966–81	1 April 1980
National	Lance Adams-Schneider	Waikato	1959–81	23 July 1980
National	Brian Talboys	Wallace	1957–81	9 December 1980
Labour	Paraone Reweti	Eastern Maori	1967–81	26 March 1981
Labour	Ron Bailey	Heretaunga	1960–81	12 December 1979
Labour	Warren Freer	Mount Albert	1947–81	Before 17 May 1979
Labour	Gordon Christie	Napier	1966–81	Before 17 May 1979
Labour	Joe Walding	Palmerston North	1967–75; 1978–81	18 March 1981
Labour	Arthur Faulkner	Roskill	1957–81	20 February 1981
Labour	Bill Fraser	St Kilda	1957–81	14 December 1979

== Election day ==
The election was held on 28 November. 2,034,747 people were registered to vote, and 91.4% turned out. That was a markedly higher turnout than recorded for the previous election, but as the official statistics for that election are regarded as highly misleading, the comparison is probably not valid. It is likely that turnout in the 1981 election was about the same as in the election before it.

== Results ==
The 1981 election saw the National Party win 47 of the 92 seats in parliament, a drop of three from before the election (National lost Hunua, Kapiti, Miramar and Wellington Central but won Taupo). This meant that National kept its majority by only a single seat, which became highly problematic over the next parliamentary term. The Labour Party won 43 seats, a gain of three (Labour won Hunua, Kapiti, Miramar and Wellington Central but lost Taupo). The Social Credit Party managed to retain its two seats, East Coast Bays and Rangitikei. No party initially held a majority until a recount flipped the seat of Gisborne from Labour to National, which gave National a working majority of one.

For the second election in a row, Labour won more votes than National, but fewer seats, allowing National to retain government despite not winning the popular vote. Social Credit won more than 20% of the popular vote but only two seats. This result, and that of 1978, contributed to New Zealand adopting the Mixed Member Proportional system of proportional representation in the 1990s.

== Detailed results ==
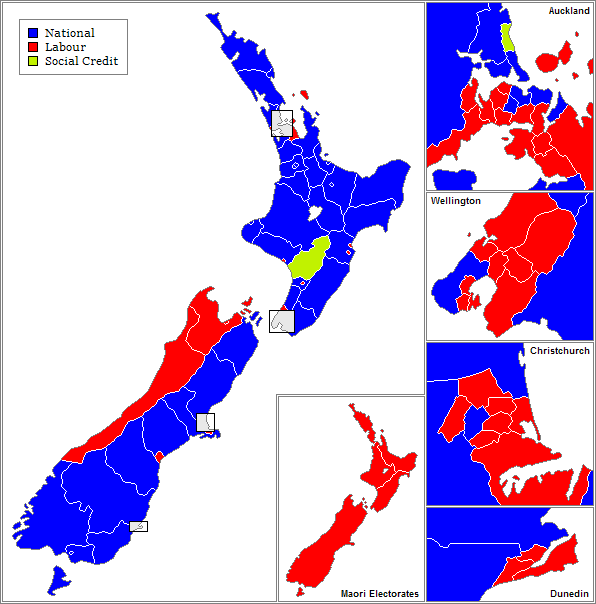
Map of electorates.

=== Party totals ===
Election results
Party	Candidates	Total votes	Percentage	Seats won
National	92	698,508	38.77	47
Labour	92	702,630	39.01	43
Social Credit	92	372,056	20.65	2
Mana Motuhake	4	8,332	0.46	-
Values	17	3,460	0.19	-
Independents	68	17,897	0.98	-
Others	39	5,096	0.28	-
Total	338	1,801,303		92

=== Votes summary ===
Popular vote
Labour	39.01%
National	38.77%
Social Credit	20.65%
Mana Motuhake	0.46%
Values	0.19%
Independents	0.98%
Others	0.28%

Parliament seats
National	51.09%
Labour	46.74%
Social Credit	2.17%

=== Individual electorate results ===
The tables below shows the results of the 1981 general election:

Key

National Labour Social Credit Mana Motuhake Independent

Electorate results for the 1981 New Zealand general election
Electorate	Incumbent	Winner	Majority	Runner up
General electorates
Albany	Don McKinnon		1,964	Bryan Mockridge
Ashburton	Rob Talbot		3,655	John Srhoy
Auckland Central	Richard Prebble		6,614	Dorice Reid
Avon	Mary Batchelor		7,820	Colin McNicholl
Awarua	Rex Austin		2,341	Dick Fitzgerald
Bay of Islands	Neill Austin		864	Les Hunter
Birkenhead	Jim McLay		2,104	Bill Smith
Christchurch Central	Geoffrey Palmer		7,028	Ian Wilson
Clutha	Robin Gray		661	Clive Matthewson
Dunedin Central	Brian MacDonell		4,169	Nancy Ruth King
Dunedin North	Stan Rodger		4,733	Des Bleach
East Cape	Duncan MacIntyre		1,964	Peter Dey
East Coast Bays	Gary Knapp		758	Don Brash
Eastern Hutt	Trevor Young		5.011	Alex Duthie
Eden	Aussie Malcolm		117	Ian Scott
Fendalton	Eric Holland	Philip Burdon	1,158	David Close
Gisborne	Bob Bell		150	Allan Wallbank (Note: Wallbank was first on election night for Gisborne, but lost on a recount.)
Hamilton East	Ian Shearer		1,188	Lois Welch
Hamilton West	Mike Minogue		1,477	Paddy McCaffrey
Hastings	David Butcher		1,845	Hamish Kynoch
Hauraki	Leo Schultz	Graeme Lee	1,787	Gordon Miller
Hawkes Bay	Richard Harrison		2,430	Mike Cullen
Helensville	Dail Jones		216	Jack Elder
Heretaunga	Ron Bailey	Bill Jeffries	2,233	Ronald Palmer
Horowhenua	Geoff Thompson		876	David Page
Hunua	Winston Peters	Colin Moyle	996	Winston Peters
Invercargill	Norman Jones		1,592	Dougal Soper
Island Bay	Frank O'Flynn		3,938	Doug Catley
Kaimai	Bruce Townshend		5,146	Douglas Conway
Kaipara	Peter Wilkinson		1,029	Nevern Connachy
Kapiti	Barry Brill	Margaret Shields	495	Barry Brill
King Country	Jim Bolger		2,158	Derek Mason
Lyttelton	Ann Hercus		3,892	Simon Stamers-Smith
Manawatu	Michael Cox		2,913	Dennis Kessell
Mangere	David Lange		5,806	John Pettit
Manurewa	Roger Douglas		2,815	Keith Ralph
Marlborough	Doug Kidd		1,643	Graeme Macann
Matamata	Jack Luxton		3,460	David Mawdsley
Miramar	Bill Young	Peter Neilson	649	Bill Young
Mount Albert	Warren Freer	Helen Clark	3,907	Warren W. Moyes
Napier	Gordon Christie	Geoff Braybrooke	3,009	Kevin Rose
Nelson	Mel Courtney (Note: Courtney had withdrawn from the Labour caucus in March 1981.)	Philip Woollaston	698	Mel Courtney
New Lynn	Jonathan Hunt		4,874	Ron Hanson
New Plymouth	Tony Friedlander		1,567	Dennis Duggan
North Shore	George Gair		3,969	Peter Chambers
Ohariu	Hugh Templeton		1,567	Norman Ely
Onehunga	Fred Gerbic		2,012	Sue Wood
Otago	Warren Cooper		4,893	Bryan Griffiths
Otahuhu	Bob Tizard		5,164	Stuart McDowell
Pahiatua	John Falloon		7,569	Bill Sutton
Pakuranga	Pat Hunt		783	Neil Morrison
Palmerston North	Joe Walding	Trevor de Cleene	2,110	Brian Elwood
Papakura	Merv Wellington		3,215	John Cheeseman
Papanui	Mike Moore		4,409	Brian Keeley
Papatoetoe	Eddie Isbey		1,689	Roy McKeen
Pencarrow	Fraser Colman		4,065	Willard Amaru
Porirua	Gerry Wall		3,639	Estelle Brittain
Rangiora	Derek Quigley		932	Chris Hayward
Rangiriri	Bill Birch		3,004	Roy Hayward
Rangitikei	Bruce Beetham		2,376	Paul Bardwell
Remuera	Allan Highet		5,105	Judith Tizard
Roskill	Arthur Faulkner	Phil Goff	2,525	Cheryl Parsons
Rotorua	Paul East		1,544	Johnny W Lepper
St Albans	David Caygill		4,926	Jim Baker
St Kilda	Bill Fraser	Michael Cullen	3,579	Stuart Clark
Selwyn	Colin McLachlan	Ruth Richardson	2,129	Bill Woods
Sydenham	John Kirk		5,594	Richard Bach
Tamaki	Robert Muldoon		5,153	Richard Northey
Taranaki	David Thomson		4,470	Brian Heilihy
Tarawera	Ian McLean		2,442	Noel Scott
Tasman	Bill Rowling		2,246	Ted Krammer
Taupo	Jack Ridley	Roger McClay (Note: McClay was declared elected by the High Court after an electoral petition.)	36	Jack Ridley
Tauranga	Keith Allen		2,232	Paul Hills
Te Atatu	Michael Bassett		3,330	Stella Noble
Timaru	Sir Basil Arthur		1,850	Jane Coughlan
Waikato	Lance Adams-Schneider	Simon Upton	4,661	Noel Johnston
Waipa	Marilyn Waring		2,768	John Kilbride
Wairarapa	Ben Couch		1,546	Tom Gemmell
Waitakere	Ralph Maxwell		2,883	Martin Gummer
Waitaki	Jonathan Elworthy		305	Jim Sutton
Waitotara	Venn Young		2,784	Sam Gray
Wallace	Brian Talboys	Derek Angus	6,558	Owen Horton
Wanganui	Russell Marshall		1,668	Terry Heffernan
Wellington Central	Ken Comber	Fran Wilde	1,283	Ken Comber
West Coast	Kerry Burke		4,406	Doug Truman
Western Hutt	John Terris		1,420	John Tanner
Whangarei	John Elliott	John Banks	1,743	Maurice Penney
Yaldhurst	Mick Connelly		1,962	Margaret Murray
Māori electorates
Eastern Maori	Paraone Reweti	Peter Tapsell	6,232	Albert Tahana
Northern Maori	Bruce Gregory		3,541	Matiu Rata
Southern Maori	Whetu Tirikatene-Sullivan		8,665	Amster Reedy
Western Maori	Koro Wētere		8,624	Eva Rickard

Table footnotes:

=== Summary of changes ===
- The seats of Hunua, Kapiti, Miramar and Wellington Central were won from incumbent National MPs by Labour challengers. The challengers in question were Colin Moyle, Margaret Shields, Peter Neilson and Fran Wilde, respectively. The defeated incumbents were Winston Peters, Barry Brill, Bill Young and Ken Comber, respectively.
- The seat of Taupo was won from the incumbent Labour MP by a National challenger. The challenger was Roger McClay and the defeated incumbent was Jack Ridley.
- The seats of Heretaunga, Mt. Albert, Napier, Palmerston North, Roskill, St. Kilda and Northern Maori passed from incumbent Labour MPs to new Labour MPs.
- In Nelson, Mel Courtney achieved the best result by an independent candidate in a New Zealand election in nearly forty years.
- The seats of Fendalton, Hauraki, Selwyn and Whangarei passed from incumbent National MPs to new National MPs. Two of these changes were the result of MPs retiring, but two (in Selwyn and Whangarei) were the result of controversial challenges to the re-selection of the incumbents. In Selwyn, Ruth Richardson successfully challenged the re-nomination of incumbent Colin McLachlan, and in Whangarei, John Banks successfully challenged the re-nomination of incumbent John Elliott.
