= 1956 Riccarton by-election =

New Zealand by-election

- 27 October 1956
- Turnout: 10,698 (66.28%)
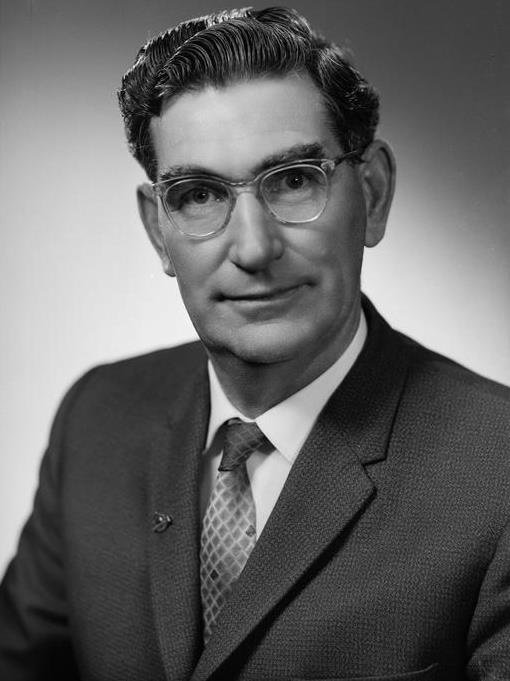

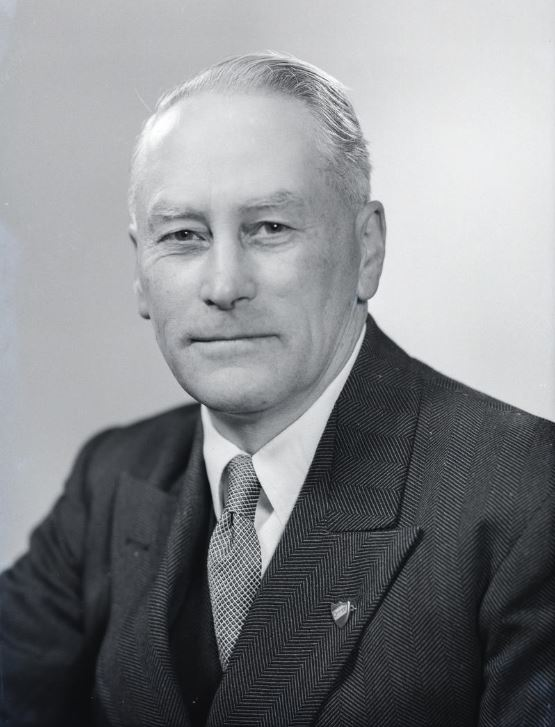
Candidate	Mick Connelly	Balfour Dingwall	Wilfrid Owen
Party	Labour	National	Social Credit
Popular vote	6,549	2,691	1,379
Percentage	61.45	25.25	12.94
MP before election
Angus McLagan
Labour
Elected MP
Mick Connelly
Labour

The Riccarton by-election 1956 was a by-election held in the Riccarton electorate in Christchurch during the term of the 31st New Zealand Parliament following the death of the Labour Party incumbent. The by-election, held on 27 October 1956, was won by Mick Connelly, also of the Labour Party.

== Background ==
The by-election was caused by the death of incumbent MP Angus McLagan of the Labour Party on 4 September 1956. McLagan, who had represented the electorate since 1946, was hospitalised in early August 1956 suffering from a chest ailment before dying several weeks later.

== Candidates ==
Labour
Several names were put forward as potential nominees for the Labour Party candidacy:

- Joseph Irvine Colligan, a Waimari County Councillor and chairman of the Riccarton Labour Representation Committee
- Mick Connelly, Labour candidate for St Albans in 1954
- Norman Kirk, Mayor of Kaiapoi and Labour candidate for Hurunui in 1954
- Tom McGuigan, Labour candidate for Lyttelton in 1954
- Louis Julian Mouat, candidate for the Christchurch City Council at the 1956 local elections

The Labour Party selected Mick Connelly as its candidate. He was the son of MLC Michael Connelly. McGuigan declined nomination, citing personal reasons, and Kirk withdrew from the selection contest prior to the selection meeting. Rotorua MP Ray Boord spoke at public meetings in Connelly's support.

National
Balfour Grieve Dingwall was chosen as the National Party's candidate. He had contested the electorate previously at the 1954 general election. Bill Sullivan, the Minister of Labour, made several speeches in Dingwall's support.

Social Credit
Founder of the Social Credit Party Wilfrid Owen contested the by-election. In the previous election he had contested the nearby seat of Lyttelton. His campaign focused on the plea that Social Credit needed a voice in parliament and targeted Labour voters to support him in the by-election given the result could not change the government. Former Labour MP, turned Social Credit activist Frank Langstone spoke at hustings in support of Owen.

Others
Ernest Yealands representing a splinter group of the Social Credit Party contested the seat against Owen, where he was expected to draw away "a few hundred votes from his one-time leader". Additionally Richard Israel Charles Grenfell had initially chosen to contest the seat as an independent, but withdrew. However, his decision to withdraw came after the ballot papers were printed.

The recently formed Liberal Federation decided against contesting the seat. The party's executive felt that their party policy would not be finalised in time for the election date.

== Campaign ==
A prominent issue in the by-election was the question of state-aid to private schools. Connelly and Dingwall opposed the notion, Yealands supported it while Owen sidestepped the issue stating that under Social Credit state-aid would not be necessary. There was also a hotly argued debate between the supporters of Connelly and Owen over whether Labour's first Prime Minister Michael Joseph Savage was a social crediter. The debate spilled over into newspapers, filling correspondence columns and letters to editors for over a week.

== Results ==
The following table gives the election results:

1956 Riccarton by-election
Party	Candidate	Votes	%	±%
Labour	Mick Connelly	6,549	61.45	
National	Balfour Dingwall	2,691	25.25	−0.96
Social Credit	Wilfrid Owen	1,379	12.94	
Ind. Social Credit	Ernest Yealands	28	0.26	
Independent	Richard Grenfell	11	0.10	
Informal votes		40	0.37	
Majority		3,858	36.20	
Turnout		10,698	66.28	−24.33
Registered electors		16,140		
Labour hold		Swing		

Connolly was re-elected at the subsequent general election confirming him as the MP. He would represent it until 1969 when he transferred to the neighbouring Wigram electorate.
