= John Rae (politician) =

New Zealand politician (1904–1979)

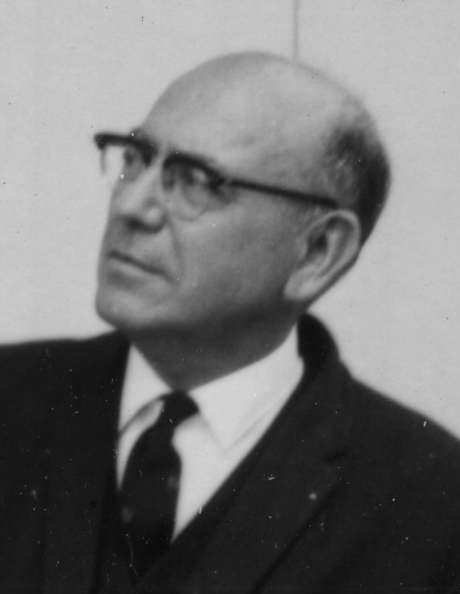
Rae in 1964

John Rae OBE (24 August 1904 – 2 December 1979) was a New Zealand politician of the National Party.

== Biography ==
New Zealand Parliament
Years	Term	Electorate	Party
1949–1951	29th	Roskill	National
1951–1954	30th	Roskill	National
1954–1957	31st	Roskill	National
1960–1963	33rd	Eden	National
1963–1966	34th	Eden	National
1966–1969	35th	Eden	National
1969–1972	36th	Eden	National

Rae was born in Auckland on either 4 or 24 August 1904, a son of Annie and Charles Edward Rae. He attended the University of Auckland and became an accountant.

Rae represented the Roskill electorate from 1949 to 1957, when he was defeated by Arthur Faulkner; and then the Eden electorate from 1960 to 1972, when he retired.

Rae was a Minister of Housing under Keith Holyoake in 1957 and from 1960 to 1972.

In 1953, Rae was awarded the Queen Elizabeth II Coronation Medal. In the 1977 New Year Honours, Rae was appointed an Officer of the Order of the British Empire, for public services.

Rae died on 2 December 1979, and he was cremated at Purewa Crematorium, Auckland.

== Notes ==
New Zealand Parliament
Preceded by Frank Langstone	Member of Parliament for Roskill; 1949–1957	Succeeded by Arthur Faulkner
Preceded by Duncan Rae	Member of Parliament for Eden; 1960–1972	Succeeded by Mike Moore
