= Wilfrid Owen =

New Zealand politician (1898–1984)

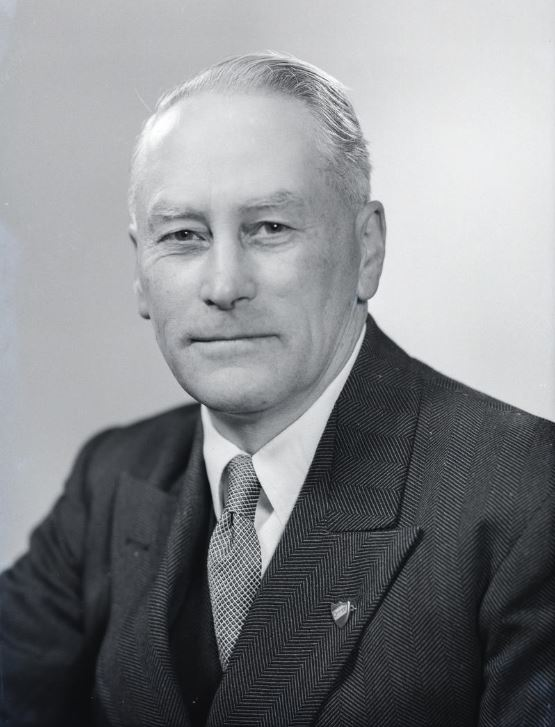

1st Leader of the Social Credit Party
- In office 16 May 1954 – 18 May 1959
- Deputy: Robert Young (1954-58); Frederick Charles Roberts (1958-59)
- Succeeded by: P. H. Matthews

Personal details
- Born: 15 June 1898 Wellington, New Zealand
- Died: 9 August 1984 (aged 86) Christchurch, New Zealand
- Party: Social Credit
- Other political affiliations: New Democratic Party (1972)
- Spouse: Ethel Amie Gough
- Children: 2

Wilfrid Barry Owen (15 June 1898 – 9 August 1984) was a New Zealand politician and the first leader (1953–1958) of New Zealand's Social Credit Party.

== Biography ==
=== Early life ===
He was born in Wellington, and educated at Christchurch Boys' High School and Nelson College. He was an industrial chemist, and founded his cosmetics and toiletries manufacturing company Wilfrid Owen New Zealand Limited in 1938. He was a resident of Sumner, Christchurch.

In 1924 he married Ethel Amie Gough, with whom he had two children. During World War II he served in the home guard. He had many community interests and was a lifelong member of the Canterbury Jockey Club, the Christchurch Businessman's Club and the Canterbury Officers' Club.

=== Political career ===
Owen entered politics via local body affairs. He was elected as a member of the Sumner Borough Council as an independent candidate. He remained a member until 1945 when Sumner was amalgamated with the Christchurch City Council. At the ensuing local-body elections in 1947 he was elected to the city council on the Citizens' Association ticket confirming him as a member. Initially he had missed out on election but was eventually declared elected after the counting of special votes. In 1950 he did not stand for re-election.

In the early 1930s he developed an interest in the monetary reform ideas of C. H. Douglas and joined the Social Credit association. He was one of 12 delegates at a summit in 1952 to promote a political wing of the association. At the associations conference in 1953 the formation of a political wing was unanimously supported, albeit reluctantly rather than supporting other parties. He became the leader of Social Credit Party in 1953. Under his leadership Social Credit got a surprising 11% of the party vote in the 1954 general election. Owen stood himself for Social Credit in Lyttelton in the 1954 election and 1957 election, coming third with 2,675 and 1,014 votes respectively; and in the Riccarton 1956 by-election.

The main impact he achieved as leader was induce the government to establish the Royal Commission on Money and Baking in 1956 to investigate Social Credits claims that the country's financial system was malfunctioning. During the investigations bankers admitted that banks actually create credit, a claim they previously disputed. Support dropped to 7% in the 1957 general election. For that and for the criticism of Social Credit by the Royal Commission (which Owen had not attended, as he was overseas) he was criticised at the 1958 conference, and he resigned from the leadership shortly after in 1959.

The Social Credit Party suffered a very public split between supporters of leader Vernon Cracknell and his deputy John O'Brien. Owen surprisingly sided with O'Brien who eventually lead a walkout and formed the splinter New Democratic Party. In the 1972 election Owen stood in Tauranga for the New Democratic Party, and came fifth with 288 votes (the Social Credit candidate came third).

He rejoined the Social Credit Party and remained a member until he died. He was not made a life member (probably due to his support of O'Brien in the 1970s schism) but was a member of the Lyttelton branch.

=== Death ===
He died in Princess Margaret Hospital, Christchurch aged 86, survived by his wife and two sons.

== Notes ==
Party political offices
New political party	Leader of the Social Credit Party; 1954–1959	Succeeded by P. H. Matthews
