= 1957 Bay of Plenty by-election =

New Zealand by-election

- 6 April 1957
- Turnout: 9,233 (72.15%)
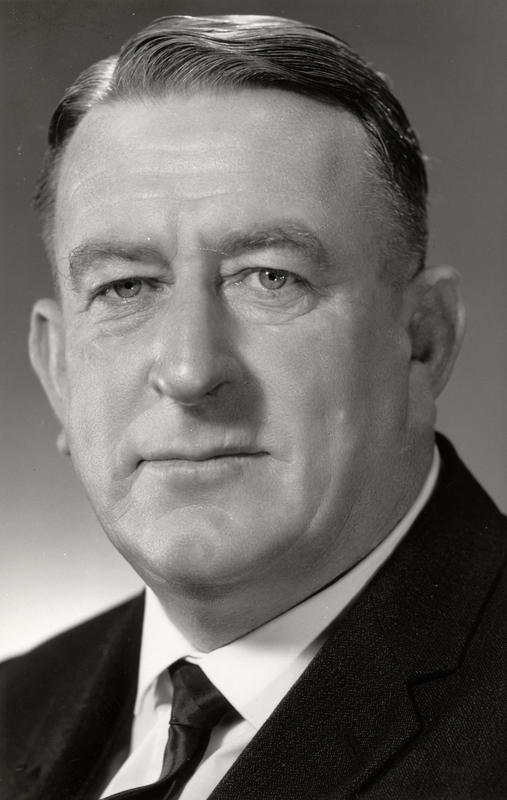

| Candidate | Percy Allen | Godfrey Santon |
| Party | National | Labour |
| Popular vote | 5,290 | 4,091 |
| Percentage | 53.99 | 41.75 |
MP before election
Bill Sullivan
National
Elected MP
Percy Allen
National

The Bay of Plenty by-election 1957 was a by-election held in the Bay of Plenty electorate in the Bay of Plenty during the term of the 31st New Zealand Parliament on 6 April 1957.

== Background ==
The by-election was caused by the resignation of incumbent MP Bill Sullivan of the National Party for personal reasons on 13 February 1957.

== Candidates ==
Labour
Thomas Godfrey Santon, a Taneaua dairy farmer who stood in the Bay of Plenty seat in 1949, 1951 and 1954, was selected to stand in the seat again for the Labour Party. There were two other nominations, whose names were not released by the party.

Liberal Federation
Reginald Joseph Pedley stood for the Liberal Federation, a newly created party. The president of the Liberal Federation, James Hill-Motion, stated that the party planned to use the by-election campaign to advertise its policies to New Zealanders. He also pushed back on jibes that his party were "dissenting Social Crediters" instead saying "We are dissenting Nationalists, but we see a danger for the country in socialism." Hill-Motion had been a Social Credit candidate for Manawatu in 1954, but regretted his nomination.

National
There were seven names that went forward for the National Party nomination:

- Lance Adams-Schneider, a businessman and member of the Taumarunui Borough Council
- Percy Allen, a plastering contractor and National's candidate for Rotorua in 1954
- Donald C. Butler, a farmer and Chairman of the Whakatane County Council
- Alwyn T. Dillon, a farmer from Te Kuiti
- Toby Gambrill, a lawyer from Gisborne
- David Norman Perry, secretary of the Tekaha Co-operative Dairy Company and secretary of the New Life Movement in the Presbyterian Church
- David Stanley Radcliffe, a farmer from Edgecombe

Butler, the chairman of the South Auckland division of the National Party, was initially seen as the likeliest candidate to win the National nomination. On 11 March a selection meeting of about 140 branch delegates in Whakatane was held and chose Allen as the party candidate for the by-election.

Social Credit
The Social Credit Party decided not to contest the by-election due to the proximity to the general election, due in several months, an opinion shared by the party's Bay of Plenty branch.

== Results ==
The following table gives the election results:

1957 Bay of Plenty by-election
| Party | Candidate | Votes | % | ±% |
|---|---|---|---|---|
| National | Percy Allen | 5,290 | 53.99 | |
| Labour | Godfrey Santon | 4,091 | 41.75 | |
| Liberal Federation | Reginald Joseph Pedley | 417 | 4.26 | |
| Majority | | 1,199 | 12.24 | |
| Informal votes | | 35 | 0.36 | |
| Turnout | | 9,233 | 72.15 | |
| Registered electors | | 13,628 | | |
| National hold | | Swing | | |

The by-election was won by Allen who remained MP for the electorate until he retired in 1975.
