= 1974 New Zealand Labour Party leadership election =

New Zealand party leadership election

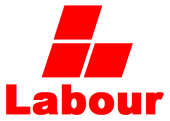
- 6 September 1974
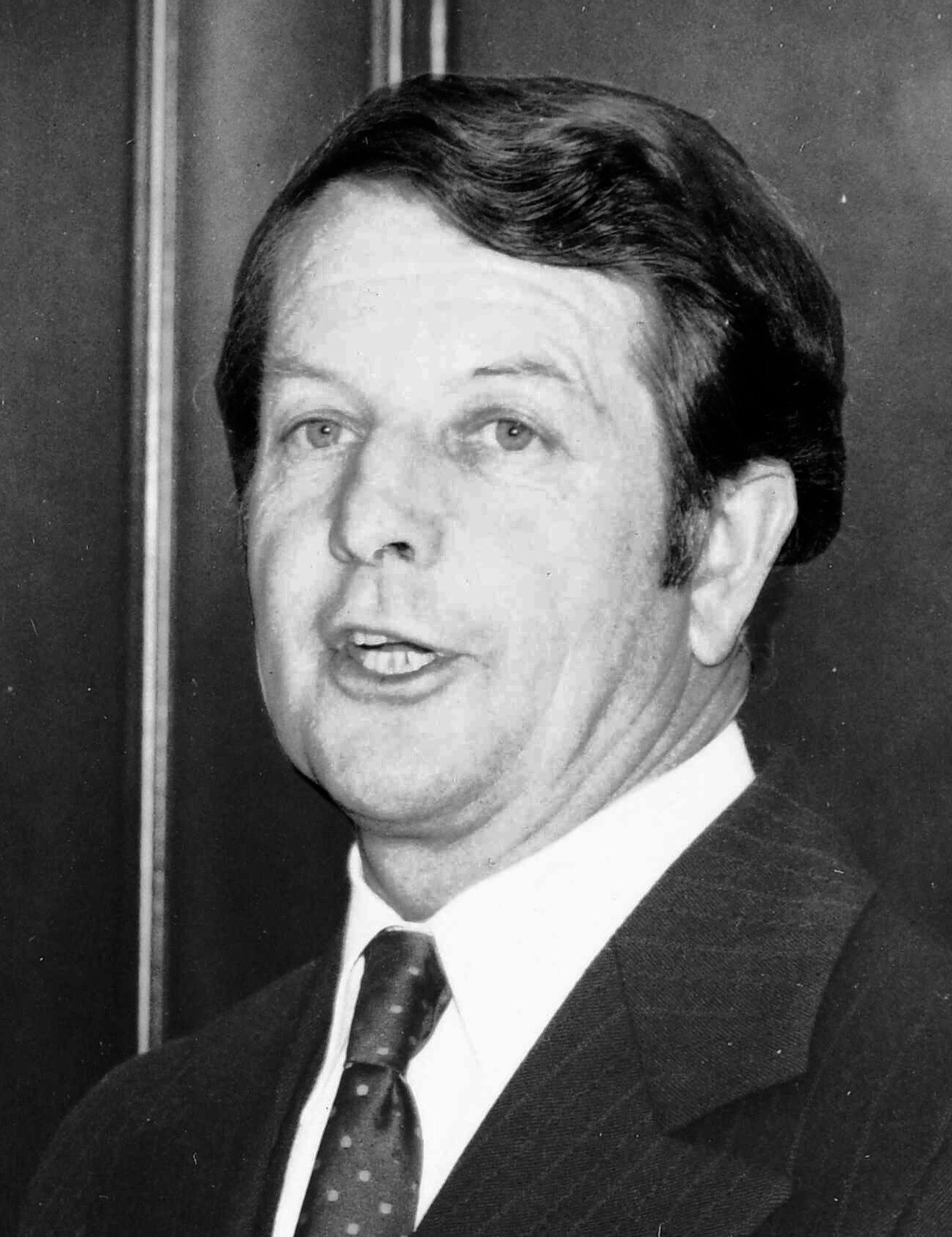

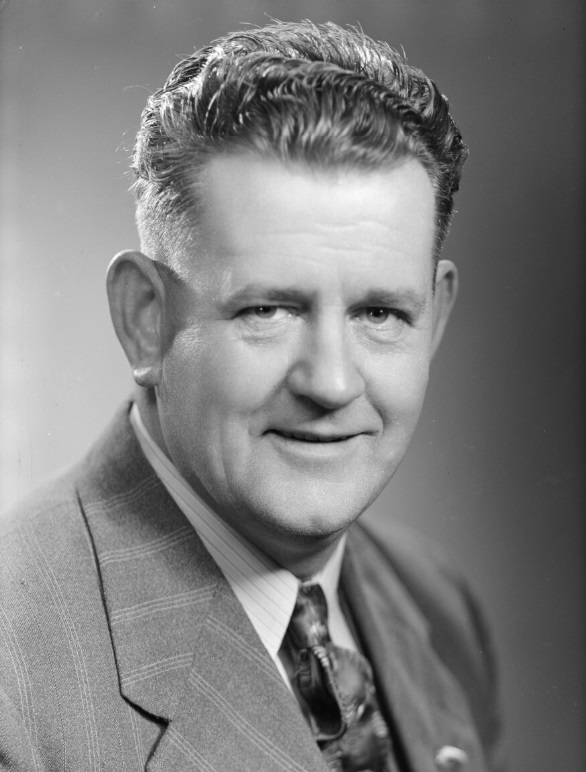
Candidate	Bill Rowling	Hugh Watt
Popular vote	44	9
Percentage	83.01%	16.99%
Leader before election
Norman Kirk†
Hugh Watt (Interim)
Leader after election
Bill Rowling

The 1974 New Zealand Labour Party leadership election was held on 6 September 1974 to determine the eighth leader of the New Zealand Labour Party. The election was won by Tasman MP Bill Rowling.

== Background ==
Prime Minister and incumbent Labour party leader Norman Kirk had died unexpectedly on 31 August 1974. Hugh Watt, as Kirk's deputy, immediately became acting Prime Minister and leader until the caucus could meet and formally elect a new leader. With indecent haste media reporting began focusing on who might succeed Kirk. Four cabinet ministers were mused as likely leadership contenders; Watt, Warren Freer (the Minister of Trade and Industry and third in the cabinet ranking also Labour's longest serving MP), Bill Rowling (the Minister of Finance and former party president) and Martyn Finlay (the Minister of Justice and former party president) with Watt initially speculated as the most likely to win. However this was narrowed to a two contestant race between Watt and Rowling whence Rowling quickly became the front-runner in caucus, whilst both Labour's National Executive and the Federation of Labour preferring Watt.

== Candidates ==
=== Bill Rowling ===
Rowling was serving as Minister of Finance in Kirk's cabinet. He was officially nominated by Southern Maori MP Whetu Tirikatene-Sullivan. President of the New Zealand Federation of Labour, and good friend of Hugh Watt, Tom Skinner attempted to talk Rowling into standing down as a candidate, however the attempt backfired and helped Rowling make up his mind that he would accept a nomination, though he stopped actively lobbying for further support. After Kirk's funeral he told Warren Freer that he would have liked another year or two in cabinet to gain more experience, but had decided to put his name forward. Rowling favoured Colin Moyle as deputy, while Freer preferred Bob Tizard as tough enough to face up to Muldoon; neither wanted Arthur Faulkner who was indecisive and delayed making decisions.

=== Hugh Watt ===
Watt was the interim Prime Minister and Deputy Prime Minister under Kirk, and had served as the party's deputy leader since 1963 first under Arnold Nordmeyer (1963–65) and then under Kirk (1965–74). Watt was favoured by the party executive as well as having the backing of the trade unions. Watt was the first to declare his candidacy stating that he would be available for the leadership if asked saying "I have always said if the situation arose when I was called on to do the job I would not hesitate to put my name forward. Of course there is nothing to stop any other members of caucus doing the same." He also confirmed that if elected he would not just be an interim leader and would have every intention of leading Labour at the 1975 election. He was officially nominated by Island Bay MP Gerald O'Brien. Many in the parliamentary party, however, felt at 61 he was too old and that Labour needed a younger leader.

== Result ==
A caucus vote was held on 6 September 1974 where Rowling received an overwhelming majority. Hugh Watt had only 9 votes (to his surprise), with the rest of the caucus voting for Rowling. Watt then surprised caucus by saying he would not stand for deputy, as having served two leaders he had done his fair share.

Bob Tizard was elected deputy leader, defeating Arthur Faulkner by 28 votes to 26. The party whip Ron Barclay learned the previous night that Faulkner had the votes to win on the first round, so he had Warren Freer (who was not interested in either position) nominated for deputy by Trevor Davey; neither Barclay or Freer wanted Faulkner as deputy as he was not leadership material, and with Freer splitting the vote he would miss out to either Bob Tizard or Colin Moyle. There were five nominations for deputy; Faulkner, Moyle, Tizard, Joe Walding and Freer (who got incredulous looks from Faulkner, Tizard and Moyle). Walding dropped out on the first ballot and Moyle on the second ballot. Freer wondered whether he would need to withdraw, but was eliminated in the third ballot. On the fourth ballot Tizard won. Freer wrote that Barclay had been right as usual, and that one of Faulkner’s supporters had failed to keep their promise.

=== Leadership ballot ===
Candidate	Votes	%
Bill Rowling	44	83.01
Hugh Watt	9	16.99
Majority	35	66.03
Turnout	53	—N/a

=== Deputy-leadership ballot ===
Candidate	Votes	%
Bob Tizard	28	51.85
Arthur Faulkner	26	48.14
Majority	2	3.70
Turnout	54	—N/a

With the leadership positions filled there was need for an election for the vacant cabinet seat. Ron Bailey was elected ahead of Norman Douglas for the position.

== Aftermath ==
Rowling age 46, became the youngest New Zealand Prime Minister since 1887. He served as Prime Minister until being defeated in the 1975 election. He remained the Labour Party's leader until 1983. Watt had expected to succeed Kirk and was of the opinion that the role was his of right as Kirk's deputy. Though disappointed, Watt was gracious in defeat also retiring as deputy leader. Most of the votes Watt received were from Labour's senior MPs such as Henry May who thought Watt deserved the leadership and that many backbenchers, who did not appreciate the administrative burden he carried, unfairly voted against him. Watt would later admit that losing the leadership vote was "the greatest, most tragic disappointment of my life, it knocked me tremendously". He remained in Rowling's cabinet, carrying the Works and Development portfolio and was later appointed to the Executive Council without portfolio. Later, Watt was appointed New Zealand's High Commissioner to the United Kingdom from 22 March 1975 for three years.
