= Roskill (New Zealand electorate) =

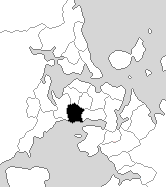
Roskill electorate boundaries between 1993 and 1996.

Roskill was a New Zealand parliamentary electorate, from 1919 to 1996. The electorate was represented by eight Members of Parliament.

== Population centres ==
In the 1918 electoral redistribution, the North Island gained a further three electorates from the South Island due to faster population growth. Only two existing electorates were unaltered, five electorates were abolished, two former electorate were re-established, and three electorates, including Roskill, were created for the first time.

The electorate was in the western suburbs of Auckland, New Zealand.

== History ==
The electorate was created in 1919, and existed continuously until 1996, the first mixed-member proportional representation (MMP) election, when it was included in the New Lynn electorate. The first representative was Vivian Potter, who represented the electorate for three terms for the Reform Party. In the 1928 election, Potter stood in the Eden electorate as an independent but was beaten by Arthur Stallworthy.

In the Roskill electorate, George Munns of the United Party won the 1928 election. He was defeated in 1931 by Arthur Shapton Richards. In 1935, Richards was challenged by the former representative Vivian Potter, but Potter came fourth out of the five candidates, with the incumbent winning the election. In the 1946 election, Richards successfully transferred to the Mount Albert electorate.

In 1999, the electorate was recreated as Mount Roskill, and was won by Phil Goff, who later became leader of the Labour Party.

=== Members of Parliament ===
The Roskill electorate was represented by eight Members of Parliament:

Key

Reform United Labour National

Election	Winner
1919 election	Vivian Potter
1922 election	Vivian Potter
1925 election	Vivian Potter
1928 election	George Munns
1931 election	Arthur Shapton Richards
1935 election	Arthur Shapton Richards
1938 election	Arthur Shapton Richards
1943 election	Arthur Shapton Richards
1946 election	Frank Langstone
1949 election	John Rae
1951 election	John Rae
1954 election	John Rae
1957 election	Arthur Faulkner
1960 election	Arthur Faulkner
1963 election	Arthur Faulkner
1966 election	Arthur Faulkner
1969 election	Arthur Faulkner
1972 election	Arthur Faulkner
1975 election	Arthur Faulkner
1978 election	Arthur Faulkner
1981 election	Phil Goff
1984 election	Phil Goff
1987 election	Phil Goff
1990 election	Gilbert Myles
1993 election	Phil Goff
(Electorate abolished 1996; see Owairaka)

Gilbert Myles' changes of allegiance, 1990–93

National Independent Liberal Alliance NZ First

== Election results ==
=== 1993 election ===
1993 general election: Roskill
Party	Candidate	Votes	%	±%
Labour	Phil Goff	7,664	39.60	−1.97
National	Allan Spence	5,459	28.21	
NZ First	Gilbert Myles	3,530	18.24	−26.48
Alliance	Jenny-Kaye Potaka	2,260	11.67	
Christian Heritage	Rowan Dunbar	355	1.83	
McGillicuddy Serious	Julian Price	82	0.42	
Majority		2,205	11.39	
Turnout		19,350	84.90	+0.42
Registered electors		22,789		

=== 1990 election ===
1990 general election: Roskill
Party	Candidate	Votes	%	±%
National	Gilbert Myles	9,132	44.72	
Labour	Phil Goff	8,488	41.57	−12.23
Green	Ian Graham Douglas	1,287	6.30	
NewLabour	Ella Henry	952	4.66	
Democrats	Douglas McGee	185	0.90	−2.19
Social Credit	John Ferdinand	153	0.74	
Independent	Walter Christie	111	0.54	
McGillicuddy Serious	Richard Alexander Foster	96	0.47	
Communist League	Anthony David Drumm	12	0.05	
Majority		644	3.15	
Turnout		20,416	85.32	−0.05
Registered electors		23,926		

=== 1987 election ===
1987 general election: Roskill
Party	Candidate	Votes	%	±%
Labour	Phil Goff	10,487	54.27	+0.47
National	Bob Foulkes	8,050	41.66	
Democrats	Douglas McGee	598	3.09	
NZ Party	Brian Murray	97	0.50	
Independent	Anthony Peter Devicich	91	0.47	+0.20
Majority		2,437	12.61	−7.89
Turnout		19,323	85.37	−3.04
Registered electors		22,633		

=== 1984 election ===
1984 general election: Roskill
Party	Candidate	Votes	%	±%
Labour	Phil Goff	11,043	53.80	+6.20
National	Chris Knowles	6,835	33.30	
NZ Party	Ben Matthews	2,217	10.80	
Social Credit	Edward James Lye	789	3.84	
Independent	Anthony Peter Devicich	57	0.27	
Values	Johan Ofman	34	0.16	
Majority		4,208	20.50	+8.21
Turnout		20,525	88.41	+1.07
Registered electors		23,214		

=== 1981 election ===
1981 general election: Roskill
Party	Candidate	Votes	%	±%
Labour	Phil Goff	9,778	47.60	
National	Cheryl Parsons	7,253	35.31	
Social Credit	Chris Lynch	3,508	17.07	
Majority		2,525	12.29	
Turnout		20,539	87.34	+18.23
Registered electors		23,515		

=== 1978 election ===
1978 general election: Roskill
Party	Candidate	Votes	%	±%
Labour	Arthur Faulkner	9,584	48.19	+2.30
National	John Banks	7,913	39.78	
Social Credit	David Howes	2,157	10.84	
Values	Steve Covacich	233	1.17	
Majority		1,671	8.40	+5.47
Turnout		19,887	69.11	−16.24
Registered electors		28,774		

=== 1975 election ===
1975 general election: Roskill
Party	Candidate	Votes	%	±%
Labour	Arthur Faulkner	8,276	45.89	−12.17
National	John Priestley	7,746	42.95	+11.60
Values	Geoff Hansen	1,037	5.75	
Social Credit	Brenda Delamore	955	5.29	
Socialist Unity	George Jackson	17	0.09	
Majority		530	2.93	−23.76
Turnout		18,031	82.35	−6.83
Registered electors		21,893		

=== 1972 election ===
1972 general election: Roskill
Party	Candidate	Votes	%	±%
Labour	Arthur Faulkner	9,653	58.06	+1.28
National	John Priestley	5,214	31.35	
Social Credit	B P Glamuzina	923	5.55	
Values	Bruce McClintock	626	3.76	
New Democratic	Robert Howie	211	1.26	−5.81
Majority		4,439	26.69	+6.05
Turnout		16,627	89.18	−0.16
Registered electors		18,644		

=== 1969 election ===
1969 general election: Roskill
Party	Candidate	Votes	%	±%
Labour	Arthur Faulkner	9,067	56.78	+2.24
National	Anthony Cook	5,771	36.14	+3.26
Social Credit	Robert Howie	1,130	7.07	−5.50
Majority		3,296	20.64	−1.02
Turnout		15,968	89.34	+4.31
Registered electors		17,873		

=== 1966 election ===
1966 general election: Roskill
Party	Candidate	Votes	%	±%
Labour	Arthur Faulkner	9,624	54.54	−3.45
National	Anthony Cook	5,802	32.88	
Social Credit	Robert Howie	2,218	12.57	+8.42
Majority		3,822	21.66	+3.82
Turnout		17,644	85.03	−5.74
Registered electors		20,748		

=== 1963 election ===
1963 general election: Roskill
Party	Candidate	Votes	%	±%
Labour	Arthur Faulkner	9,207	51.09	+2.08
National	Thomas Tucker	5,991	33.24	
Social Credit	Robert Howie	749	4.15	
Liberal	Lewis Rose	273	1.51	
Communist	Ralph Hegman	137	0.76	
Majority		3,216	17.84	+9.16
Turnout		16,357	90.77	−1.87
Registered electors		18,020		

=== 1960 election ===
1960 general election: Roskill
Party	Candidate	Votes	%	±%
Labour	Arthur Faulkner	8,414	53.17	−2.20
National	Geoffrey Taylor	6,767	42.76	
Social Credit	Frank Langstone	575	3.63	+0.08
Communist	Ella Ayo	68	0.42	
Majority		1,374	8.68	−5.62
Turnout		15,824	92.64	−1.82
Registered electors		17,080		

=== 1957 election ===
1957 general election: Roskill
Party	Candidate	Votes	%	±%
Labour	Arthur Faulkner	8,197	55.37	
National	John Rae	6,080	41.06	−12.03
Social Credit	Frank Langstone	527	3.55	
Majority		2,117	14.30	
Turnout		14,804	94.46	+4.79
Registered electors		15,671		

=== 1954 election ===
1954 general election: Roskill
Party	Candidate	Votes	%	±%
National	John Rae	7,455	53.09	+1.67
Labour	Elizabeth Morris	5,803	41.32	
Social Credit	William Sayer	783	5.57	
Majority		1,652	11.76	+8.92
Turnout		14,041	89.67	−0.74
Registered electors		15,658		

=== 1951 election ===
1951 general election: Roskill
Party	Candidate	Votes	%	±%
National	John Rae	7,962	51.42	+0.32
Labour	Pat Curran	7,522	48.58	
Majority		440	2.84	−6.96
Turnout		15,484	90.41	−3.72
Registered electors		17,126		

=== 1949 election ===
1949 general election: Roskill
Party	Candidate	Votes	%	±%
National	John Rae	7,372	51.10	
Labour	James Freeman	5,957	41.29	
Independent	Frank Langstone	1,097	7.61	−42.99
Majority		1,415	9.80	
Turnout		14,426	94.13	−0.55
Registered electors		15,324		

=== 1946 election ===
1946 general election: Roskill
Party	Candidate	Votes	%	±%
Labour	Frank Langstone	6,611	50.60	
National	Roy McElroy	6,456	49.40	+6.66
Majority		155	1.18	
Turnout		13,067	94.68	+1.57
Registered electors		13,801		

=== 1943 election ===
1943 general election: Roskill
Party	Candidate	Votes	%	±%
Labour	Arthur Shapton Richards	8,742	48.03	−8.98
National	Roy McElroy	7,780	42.74	
Democratic Labour	Keith Hay	1,015	5.57	
Real Democracy	Charles Belton	249	1.36	
People's Movement	Hawtrey Warren Glynn	145	0.79	
Independent Labour	Stanley Hamilton	95	0.52	
Informal votes		116	0.63	−0.10
Majority		962	5.28	−9.47
Turnout		18,199	93.11	−0.51
Registered electors		19,545		

=== 1938 election ===
1938 general election: Roskill
Party	Candidate	Votes	%	±%
Labour	Arthur Shapton Richards	8,272	57.01	−2.27
National	Arthur Sagar Bailey	6,431	44.32	
Informal votes		106	0.73	−0.09
Majority		2,141	14.75	−12.57
Turnout		14,509	92.60	+1.97
Registered electors		15,667		

=== 1935 election ===
1935 general election: Roskill
Party	Candidate	Votes	%	±%
Labour	Arthur Shapton Richards	8,728	59.28	+20.47
Reform	Thomas Fleming	4,705	31.96	
Democrat	William Clarvis	698	4.74	
Independent	Vivian Potter	492	3.34	
Independent Liberal	William Frederick Jamieson	98	0.66	
Informal votes		121	0.82	+0.71
Majority		4,023	27.32	+25.96
Turnout		14,721	90.63	+8.80
Registered electors		16,242		

=== 1931 election ===
1931 general election: Roskill
Party	Candidate	Votes	%	±%
Labour	Arthur Shapton Richards	4,885	38.81	
Reform	William John Holdsworth	4,714	37.45	
United	George Munns	2,988	23.74	−22.25
Majority		171	1.36	
Informal votes		14	0.11	−0.50
Turnout		12,601	81.83	−5.88
Registered electors		15,399		

=== 1928 election ===
1928 general election: Roskill
Party	Candidate	Votes	%	±%
United	George Munns	5,745	45.99	
Labour	Arthur Shapton Richards	3,401	27.23	
Reform	Ellen Melville	3,345	26.78	
Majority		2,344	18.77	
Informal votes		77	0.61	+0.02
Turnout		12,568	87.71	−2.98
Registered electors		14,329		

=== 1925 election ===
1925 general election: Roskill
Party	Candidate	Votes	%	±%
Reform	Vivian Potter	7,301	55.44	+10.93
Liberal	Alfred Hall-Skelton	4,388	33.32	+7.28
Labour	John William Yarnall	1,399	10.62	
Informal votes		79	0.59	−0.33
Majority		2,913	22.12	+3.66
Turnout		13,167	90.69	−1.43
Registered electors		14,518		

=== 1922 election ===
1922 general election: Roskill
Party	Candidate	Votes	%	±%
Reform	Vivian Potter	4,838	44.51	−0.32
Liberal	Alfred Hall-Skelton	2,831	26.04	
Independent	Ellen Melville	1,617	14.87	
Labour	Jim Purtell	1,481	13.62	
Informal votes		101	0.92	−0.09
Majority		2,007	18.46	−1.33
Turnout		10,868	92.12	+6.94
Registered electors		11,797		

=== 1919 election ===
1919 general election: Roskill
Party	Candidate	Votes	%	±%
Reform	Vivian Potter	4,200	44.83	
Independent Reform	James Gunson	2,346	25.04	
Labour	George Davis	1,998	21.33	
Independent Liberal	Frederick William Peddle	728	7.77	
Informal votes		95	1.01	
Majority		1,854	19.79	
Turnout		9,367	85.18	
Registered electors		10,996		
