= Mount Albert (New Zealand electorate) =

- Single-member general constituency for the New Zealand House of Representatives
- Interactive map of boundaries from the 2026 election
- Formation: 1946, 1999
- Region: Auckland
- Character: Urban and suburban
- Term: 3 years

Member for Mount Albert
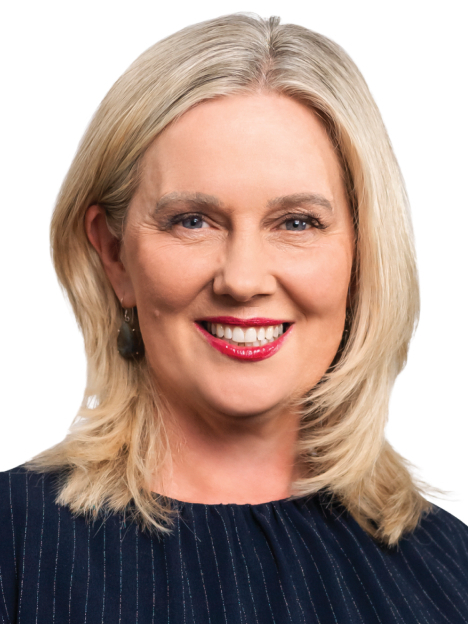
- Helen White since 14 October 2023
- Party: Labour
- List MPs: Ricardo Menéndez March (Green); Qiulae Wong (OPP)
- Previous MP: Jacinda Ardern (Labour)
Party vote distribution

Mount Albert is a parliamentary electorate based around the suburb of Mount Albert in Auckland, New Zealand, returning one member of Parliament (MP) to the House of Representatives. It has elected only Labour Party MPs since it was first contested at the 1946 election. The electorate is currently held by Helen White and was recently represented by Jacinda Ardern, formerly Prime Minister of New Zealand, who was first elected in a 2017 by-election and stepped down from parliament on 15 April 2023. Before her, Mt Albert was represented by David Shearer from 13 June 2009 to 31 December 2016; it was represented by Helen Clark from the 1981 general election until her resignation from Parliament on 17 April 2009.

The area that the electorate contains is notable for having produced three Labour prime ministers – Michael Joseph Savage, who represented the Auckland West electorate that Mt Albert was created out of in 1946; Helen Clark; and Jacinda Ardern. Additionally, David Shearer served as Labour Party leader in opposition. Warren Freer, who represented the electorate from 1947 to 1981, served as acting prime minister on three occasions.

== Population centres ==
Map of boundaries at the 2020 and 2023 general elections

The 1941 New Zealand census had been postponed due to World War II, so the 1946 electoral redistribution had to take ten years of population growth and movements into account. The North Island gained a further two electorates from the South Island due to faster population growth. The abolition of the country quota through the Electoral Amendment Act, 1945 reduced the number and increased the size of rural electorates. None of the existing electorates remained unchanged, 27 electorates were abolished, eight former electorates were re-established, and 19 electorates were created for the first time, including Mount Albert.

Mount Albert covers a segment of the western Auckland isthmus, based around the suburb of Mount Albert and includes Morningside, Kingsland, and Arch Hill on the eastern periphery of the central city down to Owairaka to the south and. Changes brought about by an electoral redistribution after the 2006 census saw a swap of suburbs with neighbouring Auckland Central – Newton on the city fringe being returned to Auckland Central, having been moved out in 1999, and Point Chevalier being drafted in. The 2013/2014 boundary review saw Grey Lynn and Westmere moved into the electorate, while transferring Waterview to the new Kelston electorate. No boundary changes were made in the 2020 redistribution. In the 2025 boundary review, the electorate ceded Grey Lynn, Westmere and part of Arch Hill to Auckland Central, and gained Wesley and parts of Sandringham and Mount Roskill from Mount Roskill, and part of Balmoral from Epsom. The initial proposal had more of Balmoral transferred to the electorate, though this did not go ahead after public consultation.

The present incarnation of Mount Albert dates to 1999, when the creation of the Mount Roskill seat necessitated removing the suburbs clustered around the north side of Manukau Harbour from the Owairaka electorate. The name Mount Albert had been out of use for only three years – before Owairaka was drawn up ahead of the change to Mixed Member Proportional voting in 1996, the Mount Albert electorate had been part of the New Zealand electoral landscape for fifty years.

== History ==
Mount Albert was first created for the 1946 election. The electorate is known for being contested by three later prime ministers, Robert Muldoon, Helen Clark and Jacinda Ardern.

The first representative, Arthur Shapton Richards, died after only one year in office. Warren Freer succeeded him in the 1947 by-election, and held the electorate until he retired in 1981.

Muldoon (prime minister from 1975 to 1984) unsuccessfully sought the National Party nomination for the electorate in 1951. He gained the nomination to challenge Freer in the 1954 election, his first run for Parliament, but was unable to take the seat from the Labour Party, like all other National candidates before or since. Mount Albert's inner-suburb, working-class composition makes it one of Labour's safest seats.

Freer was succeeded by Helen Clark, who held the electorate until 1996, when it was abolished and she moved to the Owairaka electorate. When the Mount Albert electorate was re-established for the 1999 election, Clark became the representative again. She was Prime Minister from 1999 to 2008. In 2009, she resigned to become head of the United Nations Development Programme.

Clark was succeeded by David Shearer in the 2009 by-election. He was re-elected as MP in the 2011 and 2014 general elections, before resigning in late 2016 to lead the United Nations' peacekeeping mission in South Sudan. Jacinda Ardern, who had previously stood in the Auckland Central electorate, won the February 2017 by-election. She became leader of the Labour Party in August that year, 8 weeks before the 2017 general election, after Andrew Little stepped down as leader. Ardern retained the electorate for the subsequent two elections before not contesting the 2023 election election. Helen White won the electorate for Labour by a margin of 18 votes, the slimmest of the election.

=== Members of Parliament ===
Key

Labour

Election	Winner
1946 election	Arthur Shapton Richards
1947 by-election	Warren Freer
1949 election	Warren Freer
1951 election	Warren Freer
1954 election	Warren Freer
1957 election	Warren Freer
1960 election	Warren Freer
1963 election	Warren Freer
1966 election	Warren Freer
1969 election	Warren Freer
1972 election	Warren Freer
1975 election	Warren Freer
1978 election	Warren Freer
1981 election	Helen Clark
1984 election	Helen Clark
1987 election	Helen Clark
1990 election	Helen Clark
1993 election	Helen Clark
(Electorate abolished 1996–1999), see Owairaka
1999 election	Helen Clark (2nd period)
2002 election	Helen Clark (2nd period)
2005 election	Helen Clark (2nd period)
2008 election	Helen Clark (2nd period)
2009 by-election	David Shearer
2011 election	David Shearer
2014 election	David Shearer
2017 by-election	Jacinda Ardern
2017 election	Jacinda Ardern
2020 election	Jacinda Ardern
2023 election	Helen White
2026 election	Helen White

=== List MPs ===
Members of Parliament elected from party lists in elections where that person also unsuccessfully contested the Mount Albert electorate. Unless otherwise stated, all MPs terms began and ended at general elections.

Key

National Green

Election	Winner
2011 election	David Clendon
2011 election	Melissa Lee
2014 election	Melissa Lee
2017 election	Julie Anne Genter
2017 election	Melissa Lee
2020 election	Melissa Lee
2023 election	Ricardo Menéndez March
2023 election	Melissa Lee

== Election results ==
=== 2026 election ===
The next election will be held on 7 November 2026. Candidates for Mount Albert are listed at Candidates in the 2026 New Zealand general election by electorate § Mount Albert. Official results will be available after 27 November 2026.

=== 2023 election ===
2023 general election: Mount Albert
Notes:	Blue background denotes the winner of the electorate vote. Pink background denotes a candidate elected from their party list. Yellow background denotes an electorate win by a list member, or other incumbent. A ✓ or ✗ denotes status of any incumbent, win or lose respectively.						
Party	Candidate	Votes	%	±%	Party votes	%	±%
Labour	Helen White	13,238	33.73	-37.01	10,341	26.00	-22.61
National	Melissa Lee	13,220	33.68	+14.35	12,706	31.94	+13.31
Green	Ricardo Menéndez March	9,296	23.69	+18.13	10,023	25.21	+5.29
ACT	Ollie Murphy	1,485	3.78		2,681	6.74	+0.78
Opportunities	Ciara Swords	1,318	3.36		1,474	3.71	+1.53
Independent	Tesi Naufahu	155	0.40				
Human Rights Party	Anthony Van den Heuvel	104	0.26	+0.05			
NZ First					1,219	3.07	+1.25
Te Pāti Māori					641	1.61	+1.12
NZ Loyal					147	0.37	
Legalise Cannabis					115	0.29	+0.09
NewZeal					83	0.21	+0.21
Freedoms NZ					60	0.15	
Animal Justice					51	0.13	
Women's Rights					39	0.10	
New Conservatives					30	0.08	−0.50
DemocracyNZ					21	0.05	
New Nation					9	0.02	
Leighton Baker Party					5	0.02	
Informal votes		430			121		
Total valid votes		39,246			39,767		
Labour hold	Majority	18	0.05	−51.34			

=== 2020 election ===
2020 general election: Mount Albert
Notes:	Blue background denotes the winner of the electorate vote. Pink background denotes a candidate elected from their party list. Yellow background denotes an electorate win by a list member, or other incumbent. A ✓ or ✗ denotes status of any incumbent, win or lose respectively.						
Party	Candidate	Votes	%	±%	Party votes	%	±%
Labour	✓ Jacinda Ardern	29,238	70.72	+6.81	20,265	48.60	+5.41
National	Melissa Lee	7,992	19.33	–4.62	7,769	18.63	–15.19
Green	Luke Wijohn	2,299	5.56	−0.82	8,311	19.93	+5.34
Opportunities	Cameron Lord	903	2.18	−0.23	1.048	2.51	–0.44
New Conservative	Daniel Reurich	316	0.76	+0.46	241	0.58	+0.42
Human Rights Party	Anthony Van den Heuvel	87	0.21	+0.14			
ACT					2,485	5.96	+5.37
NZ First					760	1.82	–1.60
Māori Party					205	0.49	+0.04
Advance NZ					141	0.34	—
Legalise Cannabis					83	0.20	+0.04
TEA					41	0.10	—
ONE					34	0.08	—
Sustainable NZ					22	0.05	—
Outdoors					16	0.04	—
Vision New Zealand					11	0.02	—
Social Credit					4	0.009	–0.001
Heartland					3	0.007	–
Informal votes		507			258		
Total valid votes		41,342			41,697		
Labour hold	Majority	21,246	51.39	+11.43			

=== 2017 election ===
2017 general election: Mount Albert
Notes:	Blue background denotes the winner of the electorate vote. Pink background denotes a candidate elected from their party list. Yellow background denotes an electorate win by a list member, or other incumbent. A ✓ or ✗ denotes status of any incumbent, win or lose respectively.						
Party	Candidate	Votes	%	±%	Party votes	%	±%
Labour	✓ Jacinda Ardern	24,416	63.91	+5.74	16,742	43.19	+13.88
National	Melissa Lee	9,152	23.95	−4.66	13,112	33.82	−5.56
Green	Julie Anne Genter	2,438	6.38	−2.36	5,657	14.59	−7.09
Opportunities	Dan Thurston	924	2.41	-	1,144	2.95	—
NZ First	Andrew Littlejohn	724	1.89	—	1,329	3.42	−0.68
Conservative	Jeff Johnson	117	0.30	−1.16	65	0.16	−1.79
Independent	Bruce Stockman	66	0.17	—			
Human Rights Party	Anthony Van den Heuvel	28	0.07	−0.14			
ACT					229	0.59	−0.47
Māori Party					175	0.45	−0.03
Legalise Cannabis					63	0.16	−0.09
People's Party					31	0.07	—
United Future					22	0.05	−0.10
Outdoors					17	0.04	—
Internet					12	0.04	—
Mana					8	0.02	—
Ban 1080					6	0.01	−0.02
Democrats					2	0.01	−0.01
Informal votes		334			146		
Total valid votes		38,199			38,760		
Turnout		38,760					
Labour hold	Majority	15,264	39.96	+10.40			

=== 2017 by-election ===
The following table shows the final results:

2017 Mount Albert by-election
Notes: Blue background denotes the winner of the by-election. Pink background denotes a candidate elected from their party list prior to the by-election. Yellow background denotes the winner of the by-election, who was a list MP prior to the by-election. A ✓ or ✗ denotes status of any incumbent, win or lose respectively.
Party	Candidate	Votes	%	±%
Labour	Jacinda Ardern	10,495	76.89	
Green	Julie Anne Genter	1,564	11.45	
Opportunities	Geoff Simmons	623	4.56	
People's Party	Vin Tomar	218	1.59	
Socialist Aotearoa	Joe Carolan	189	1.38	
Independent	Penny Bright	139	1.01	
Legalise Cannabis	Abe Gray	97	0.71	
Independent	Adam Amos	81	0.59	
Independent	Dale Arthur	54	0.39	
Human Rights Party	Anthony Van den Heuvel	34	0.24	
Independent	Peter Wakeman	30	0.21	
Not A Party	Simon Smythe	19	0.13	
Communist League	Patrick Brown	16	0.11	
Informal votes		90	0.65	
Total Valid votes		13,649	30.00	
Labour hold	Majority	8,931	65.43	

=== 2014 election ===
2014 general election: Mount Albert
Notes:	Blue background denotes the winner of the electorate vote. Pink background denotes a candidate elected from their party list. Yellow background denotes an electorate win by a list member, or other incumbent. A ✓ or ✗ denotes status of any incumbent, win or lose respectively.						
Party	Candidate	Votes	%	±%	Party votes	%	±%
Labour	✓ David Shearer	20,970	58.17	−1.02	10,823	29.31	−7.78
National	Melissa Lee	10,314	28.61	+1.11	14,359	38.89	+2.22
Green	Jeanette Elley	3,152	8.74	−0.75	8,005	21.68	+4.53
Conservative	Jeff Johnson	525	1.46	−1.03	719	1.95	+0.34
ACT	Tommy Fergusson	321	0.89	−0.45	356	0.96	+0.03
Mana	Joe Carolan	290	0.80	+0.80			
Human Rights Party	Anthony van den Heuvel	76	0.21	+0.21			
Independent	Michael Wackrow	68	0.19	+0.19			
NZ First					1,512	4.10	−0.43
Internet Mana					603	1.63	+1.05 (Note: 2014 Internet Mana swing is relative to the votes for Mana in 2011; it shared a party list with Internet in the 2014 election.)
Māori Party					178	0.48	−0.04
Legalise Cannabis					93	0.25	−0.16
United Future					57	0.15	−0.20
Ban 1080					12	0.03	+0.03
Civilian					11	0.03	+0.03
Democrats					7	0.02	±0.00
Focus					6	0.02	+0.02
Independent Coalition					5	0.01	+0.01
Informal votes		336			176		
Total valid votes		36,052			36,922		
Turnout		36,922	79.41	+6.42			
Labour hold	Majority	10,656	29.56	−2.13			

=== 2011 election ===
2011 general election: Mount Albert
Notes:	Blue background denotes the winner of the electorate vote. Pink background denotes a candidate elected from their party list. Yellow background denotes an electorate win by a list member, or other incumbent. A ✓ or ✗ denotes status of any incumbent, win or lose respectively.						
Party	Candidate	Votes	%	±%	Party votes	%	±%
Labour	✓ David Shearer	18,716	59.19	−0.10	12,238	37.09	−5.51
National	Melissa Lee	8,695	27.50	−1.35	12,102	36.67	+1.01
Green	David Clendon	3,000	9.49	+3.55	5,660	17.15	+6.15
Conservative	Frank Poching	786	2.49	+2.49	532	1.61	+1.61
ACT	Stephen Boyle	425	1.34	−2.75	306	0.93	−2.58
NZ First					1,494	4.53	+1.85
Mana					191	0.58	-+0.58
Māori Party					172	0.52	−0.26
Legalise Cannabis					135	0.41	+0.12
United Future					114	0.35	−0.32
Libertarianz					29	0.09	+0.04
Alliance					21	0.06	+0.01
Democrats					5	0.02	-0.005
Informal votes		969			272		
Total valid votes		31,622			32,999		
Labour hold	Majority	10,021	31.69	+1.24			

Electorate (as at 26 November 2011): 45,208

=== 2009 by-election ===
2009 Mount Albert by-election
Notes: Blue background denotes the winner of the by-election. Pink background denotes a candidate elected from their party list prior to the by-election. Yellow background denotes the winner of the by-election, who was a list MP prior to the by-election. A ✓ or ✗ denotes status of any incumbent, win or lose respectively.
Party	Candidate	Votes	%	±%
Labour	David Shearer	13,260	63.49	+4.20
National	Melissa Lee^{a}	3,542	16.96	-11.88
Green	Russel Norman^{a}	2,567	12.29	+6.35
ACT	John Boscawen^{a}	968	4.63	+0.54
Bill and Ben	Ben Boyce	158	0.76	
Legalise Cannabis	Dakta Green	92	0.44	
Kiwi	Simonne Dyer	91	0.44	
United Future	Judy Turner	89	0.43	
Libertarianz	Julian Pistorius	39	0.19	
Independent	Jim Bagnell	24	0.11	
Independent	Ari Baker	15	0.07	
Human Rights Party	Anthony Van den Heuvel	13	0.06	
People Before Profit	Malcom France	13	0.06	
Independent	Jackson James Wood	9	0.04	
People's Choice	Rusty Kane	5	0.02	
Informal votes		58		
Total Valid votes		20,885		
Labour hold	Majority	9,718	46.40	+4.02

^{a} Three candidates were list MPs elected at the 2008 election.

=== 2008 election ===
2008 general election: Mount Albert
Notes:	Blue background denotes the winner of the electorate vote. Pink background denotes a candidate elected from their party list. Yellow background denotes an electorate win by a list member, or other incumbent. A ✓ or ✗ denotes status of any incumbent, win or lose respectively.						
Party	Candidate	Votes	%	±%	Party votes	%	±%
Labour	✓ Helen Clark	20,157	59.29	−7.26	14,894	42.60	−11.73
National	Ravi Musuku	9,806	28.84	+9.21	12,468	35.66	+9.31
Green	Jon Carapiet	2,019	5.94	+1.22	3,846	11.00	+1.73
ACT	Kathleen McCabe	1,392	4.09	+1.72	1,227	3.51	+1.49
Kiwi	Christian Dawson	249	0.73		157	0.45	
Pacific	Milo Siilata	234	0.69		273	0.78	
Human Rights Party	Anthony van den Heuvel	87	0.26				
RONZ	Dave Llewell	53	0.16	+0.16	16	0.05	+0.03
NZ First					936	2.68	−0.70
Māori Party					273	0.78	−0.26
Progressive					244	0.70	
United Future					232	0.66	
Bill and Ben					132	0.38	
Legalise Cannabis					101	0.29	
Family Party					92	0.26	
Alliance					19	0.05	
RAM					19	0.05	
Libertarianz					16	0.05	
Workers Party					11	0.03	
Democrats					7	0.02	
Informal votes		410			256		
Total valid votes		33,997			34,963		
Labour hold	Majority	10,351					

=== 2005 election ===
2005 general election: Mount Albert
Notes:	Blue background denotes the winner of the electorate vote. Pink background denotes a candidate elected from their party list. Yellow background denotes an electorate win by a list member, or other incumbent. A ✓ or ✗ denotes status of any incumbent, win or lose respectively.						
Party	Candidate	Votes	%	±%	Party votes	%	±%
Labour	✓ Helen Clark	20,918	66.55	−1.94	17,501	54.33	+2.53
National	Ravi Musuku	6,169	19.63		8,488	26.35	+13.33
Green	Jon Carapiet	1,485	4.72	−0.67	2,985	9.27	−1.35
NZ First	Julian Batchelor	746	2.37		1,089	3.38	−3.01
ACT	David Seymour	746	2.37		651	2.02	−5.09
United Future	Tony Gordon	529	1.68		649	2.01	−3.28
Progressive	Jenny Wilson	407	1.29		525	1.59	−0.10
Destiny	Anne Williamson	337	1.07		157	0.49	
Independent	Jim Bagnall	83	0.26				
Anti-Capitalist Alliance	Daphna Whitmore	79	0.25	-0.15			
Independent	Anthony Ravlich	47	0.15				
Direct Democracy	Howard Ponga	30	0.10		10	0.03	
Independent	Erik Taylor	29	0.09				
Māori Party					168	0.52	
Legalise Cannabis					43	0.13	−0.40
Christian Heritage					40	0.12	−0.89
Alliance					22	0.07	−1.69
Family Rights					20	0.06	
Libertarianz					19	0.06	
RONZ					8	0.02	
99 MP					6	0.02	
Democrats					3	0.01	
One NZ					0	0.00	−0.01
Informal votes		316			130		
Total valid votes		31,747			32,342		
Labour hold	Majority	14,749					

=== 2002 election ===
2002 general election: Mount Albert
Notes:	Blue background denotes the winner of the electorate vote. Pink background denotes a candidate elected from their party list. Yellow background denotes an electorate win by a list member, or other incumbent. A ✓ or ✗ denotes status of any incumbent, win or lose respectively.						
Party	Candidate	Votes	%	±%	Party votes	%	±%
Labour	✓ Helen Clark	19,514	68.49		15,021	51.80	
National	Raewyn Bhana	3,490	12.24		3,777	13.02	
ACT	Bruce Williams	1,550	5.44		2,063	7.11	
Green	Jon Carapiet	1,537	5.39		3,080	10.62	
United Future	Hassan Hosseini	726	2.54		1,534	5.29	
Christian Heritage	Pauline G. Cooper	426	1.49		295	1.01	
Alliance	Jill Ovens	334	1.17		494	1.70	
Progressive	Gillian Dance	299	1.04		491	1.69	
Legalise Cannabis	Daphna Whitmore	116	0.40		115	0.53	
Independent	Rick Stevenson	52	0.18				
NZ First					1,855	6.39	
ORNZ					98	0.33	
Mana Māori					6	0.02	
One NZ					4	0.01	
NMP					4	0.01	
Informal votes		447			160		
Total valid votes		28,491			28,997		
Labour hold	Majority	16,024	56.24				

=== 1999 election ===
1999 general election: Mount Albert
Notes:	Blue background denotes the winner of the electorate vote. Pink background denotes a candidate elected from their party list. Yellow background denotes an electorate win by a list member, or other incumbent. A ✓ or ✗ denotes status of any incumbent, win or lose respectively.						
Party	Candidate	Votes	%	±%	Party votes	%	±%
Labour	Helen Clark	18,982	64.37		15,327	51.37	
National	Noelene Buckland	5,874	19.92		6,823	22.87	
Alliance	Jill Ovens	1,139	3.86		2,146	7.19	
ACT	Daniel King	1,062	3.60		1,776	5.95	
Green	Mike Johnson	1,032	3.50		1,675	5.61	
Christian Heritage	Diane Taylor	658	2.23		542	1.82	
NZ First	Seini Mafi	403	1.37		694	2.33	
McGillicuddy Serious	Kerry Hoole	193	0.65		29	0.65	
United NZ	Hassan Hosseini	124	0.42		186	0.62	
Republican	Jane Hotere	23	0.08		3	0.01	
Legalise Cannabis					186	0.62	
Libertarianz					58	0.19	
Animals First					46	0.15	
Mauri Pacific					14	0.05	
Natural Law					12	0.04	
One NZ					9	0.03	
Mana Māori					7	0.02	
South Island					6	0.02	
NMP					3	0.01	
The People's Choice					1	0.003	
Informal votes		656			309		
Total valid votes		29,490			29,837		
Labour win new seat	Majority	13,108	44.45				

=== 1993 election ===
1993 general election: Mount Albert
Party	Candidate	Votes	%	±%
Labour	Helen Clark	9,546	49.41	+5.93
National	Vanessa Brown	4,890	25.31	
Alliance	Doug McGee	2,873	14.87	
NZ First	Elizabeth Anderson	1,370	7.09	
Christian Heritage	Jens Meder	259	1.34	
McGillicuddy Serious	KT Julian	195	1.00	
Workers Rights	Ivan Sowry	97	0.50	
Natural Law	Stewart Sanson	62	0.32	
Defence Movement	Anthony Van Den Heuvel	25	0.12	
Majority		4,656	24.10	+17.35
Turnout		19,317	83.45	+1.26
Registered electors		23,146		

=== 1990 election ===
1990 general election: Mount Albert
Party	Candidate	Votes	%	±%
Labour	Helen Clark	7,914	43.48	−18.77
National	Larry Belshaw	6,684	36.72	
Green	Harry Parke	1,774	9.74	
NewLabour	Jennie Walker	1,418	7.79	
McGillicuddy Serious	Adrian Holroyd	151	0.82	
Social Credit	Richard Povall	133	0.73	
Democrats	Syd Leach	127	0.69	
Majority		1,230	6.75	−23.68
Turnout		18,201	82.19	−1.83
Registered electors		22,143		

=== 1987 election ===
1987 general election: Mount Albert
Party	Candidate	Votes	%	±%
Labour	Helen Clark	11,326	62.25	+5.51
National	Rob Wheeler	5,989	32.91	
Democrats	Gillian Dance	861	4.73	
Independent	Malcolm Moses	17	0.09	
Majority		5,537	30.43	+1.64
Turnout		18,193	84.02	−5.80
Registered electors		21,653		

=== 1984 election ===
1984 general election: Mount Albert
Party	Candidate	Votes	%	±%
Labour	Helen Clark	12,231	56.74	+5.42
National	Rod Cavanagh	6,024	27.94	
NZ Party	Michelle Gonsalves	2,390	11.08	
Social Credit	Douglas McGee	908	4.21	
Majority		6,207	28.79	+8.80
Turnout		21,553	89.82	+3.48
Registered electors		23,995		

=== 1981 election ===
1981 general election: Mount Albert
Party	Candidate	Votes	%	±%
Labour	Helen Clark	10,027	51.32	
National	Warren Moyes	6,120	31.32	
Social Credit	Harold Dance	3,391	17.35	+5.84
Majority		3,907	19.99	
Turnout		19,538	86.34	+2.00
Registered electors		22,627		

=== 1978 election ===
1978 general election: Mount Albert
Party	Candidate	Votes	%	±%
Labour	Warren Freer	9,718	47.55	+2.40
National	Frank Ryan	7,994	39.11	−4.74
Social Credit	Harold Dance	2,353	11.51	
Values	Sheelah Chalken	371	1.81	
Majority		2,861	13.99	+12.64
Turnout		20,436	84.34	−5.07
Registered electors		24,229		

=== 1975 election ===
1975 general election: Mount Albert
Party	Candidate	Votes	%	±%
Labour	Warren Freer	8,231	45.15	−11.04
National	Frank Ryan	7,994	43.85	
Values	Barrie McKay	1,060	5.81	
Social Credit	Clarkson James	914	5.01	
Socialist Unity	Les Bravery	28	0.15	
Majority		247	1.35	−22.97
Turnout		18,227	79.27	−8.62
Registered electors		22,993		

=== 1972 election ===
1972 general election: Mount Albert
Party	Candidate	Votes	%	±%
Labour	Warren Freer	9,196	56.19	+2.05
National	John Hamilton Malcolm	5,216	31.87	
Social Credit	Byrt Jordan	1,024	6.25	
Values	Terrence Michael McGrath	724	4.42	
New Democratic	Pauline Howie	203	1.24	
Majority		3,980	24.32	+7.37
Turnout		16,363	87.89	−0.93
Registered electors		18,617		

=== 1969 election ===
1969 general election: Mount Albert
Party	Candidate	Votes	%	±%
Labour	Warren Freer	9,057	54.14	+2.81
National	Gavin Downie	6,220	37.18	
Social Credit	Tom Weal	1,451	8.67	
Majority		2,837	16.95	−1.56
Turnout		16,728	88.82	+3.80
Registered electors		18,832		

=== 1966 election ===
1966 general election: Mount Albert
Party	Candidate	Votes	%	±%
Labour	Warren Freer	7,359	51.33	−3.37
National	Tom Hibbert	4,705	32.82	
Social Credit	Tom Weal	2,270	15.83	
Majority		2,654	18.51	−0.64
Turnout		14,334	85.02	−5.54
Registered electors		16,858		

=== 1963 election ===
1963 general election: Mount Albert
Party	Candidate	Votes	%	±%
Labour	Warren Freer	8,618	54.70	+1.50
National	Jeffrey Lloyd Reid	5,600	35.54	
Social Credit	Tom Weal	1,058	6.71	
Liberal	Walter Ellis Christie	478	3.03	
Majority		3,018	19.15	+7.87
Turnout		15,754	90.56	+0.17
Registered electors		17,396		

=== 1960 election ===
1960 general election: Mount Albert
Party	Candidate	Votes	%	±%
Labour	Warren Freer	7,905	53.20	−7.51
National	Clarice Anderson	6,229	41.92	
Social Credit	N R Monteith	690	4.64	
Independent	L Pitcher	34	0.22	
Majority		1,676	11.28	−16.33
Turnout		14,858	90.39	−3.11
Registered electors		16,437		

=== 1957 election ===
1957 general election: Mount Albert
Party	Candidate	Votes	%	±%
Labour	Warren Freer	8,766	60.71	+2.90
National	Geoffrey Taylor	4,779	33.10	
Social Credit	John Francis Gerrard	892	6.17	
Majority		3,987	27.61	+5.52
Turnout		14,437	93.50	+1.28
Registered electors		15,439		

=== 1954 election ===
1954 general election: Mount Albert
Party	Candidate	Votes	%	±%
Labour	Warren Freer	8,441	57.81	+5.59
National	Robert Muldoon	5,215	35.72	
Social Credit	Walter Crispin	943	6.45	
Majority		3,226	22.09	+17.65
Turnout		14,599	92.22	+1.66
Registered electors		15,830		

=== 1951 election ===
1951 general election: Mount Albert
Party	Candidate	Votes	%	±%
Labour	Warren Freer	7,092	52.22	−1.19
National	Reg Judson	6,488	47.77	+1.18
Majority		604	4.44	−2.37
Turnout		13,580	90.56	−3.06
Registered electors		14,994		

=== 1949 election ===
1949 general election: Mount Albert
Party	Candidate	Votes	%	±%
Labour	Warren Freer	7,295	53.41	−2.60
National	Reg Judson	6,364	46.59	
Majority		931	6.81	−5.21
Turnout		13,659	93.62	+6.53
Registered electors		14,589		

=== 1947 by-election ===
1947 Mount Albert by-election
Party	Candidate	Votes	%	±%
Labour	Warren Freer	7,235	56.01	
National	Jack Garland	5,682	43.99	
Majority		1,553	12.02	
Informal votes		26	0.20	−0.34
Turnout		12,943	87.09	−7.38
Registered electors		14,861		
Labour hold		Swing		

=== 1946 election ===
1946 general election: Mount Albert
Party	Candidate	Votes	%	±%
Labour	Arthur Shapton Richards	7,681	56.88	
National	Frederick Ashley Hosking	5,824	43.12	
Informal votes		74	0.54	
Majority		1,857	13.75	
Turnout		13,579	94.47	
Registered electors		14,374		
