= 30th New Zealand Parliament =

Term of the Parliament of New Zealand

30th Parliament of New Zealand
| ← | 29th Parliament | 31st Parliament | → |
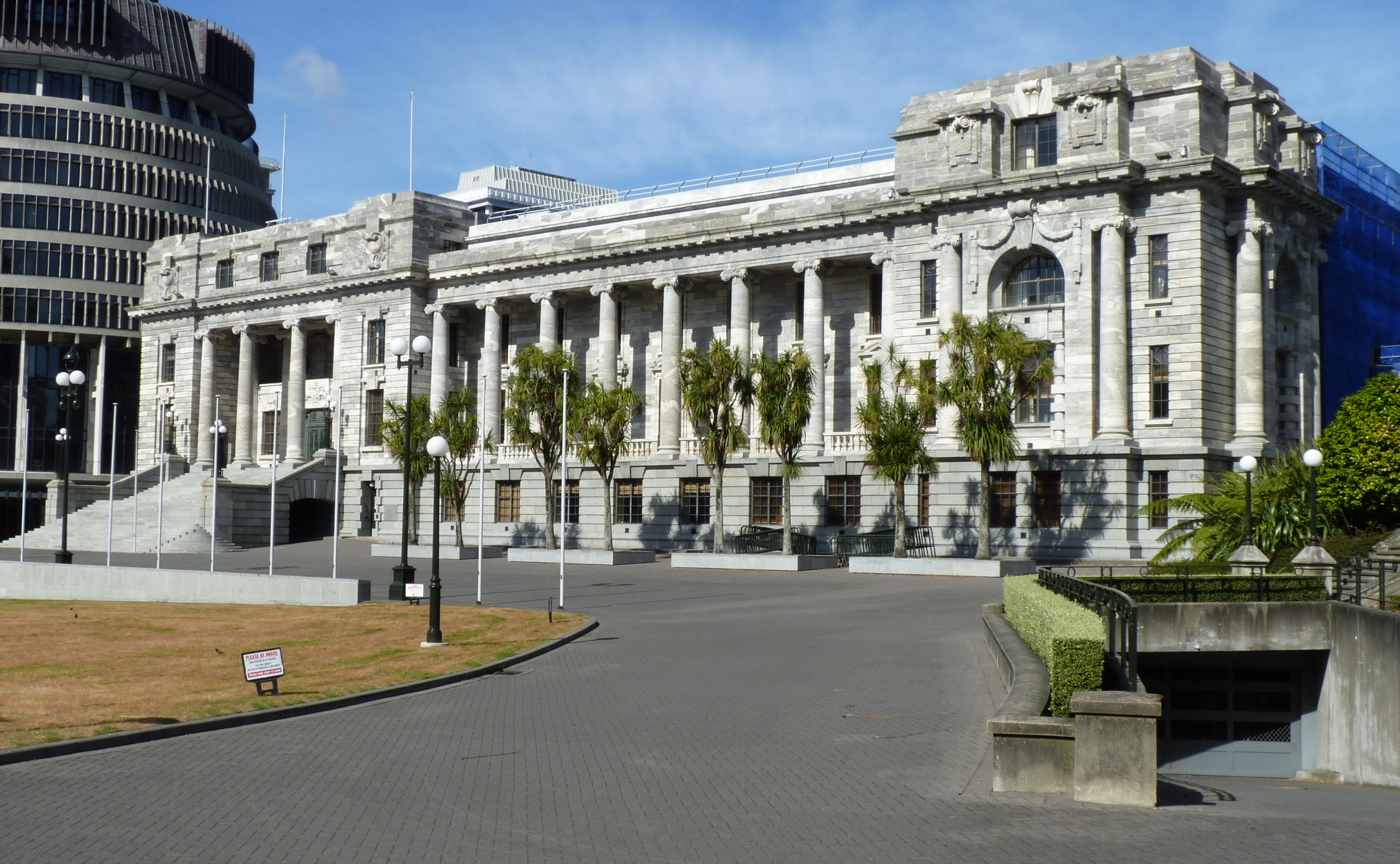
- Parliament House, Wellington

Overview
- Legislative body: New Zealand Parliament
- Term: 25 September 1951 – 1 October 1954
- Election: 1951 New Zealand general election
- Government: First National Government

House of Representatives
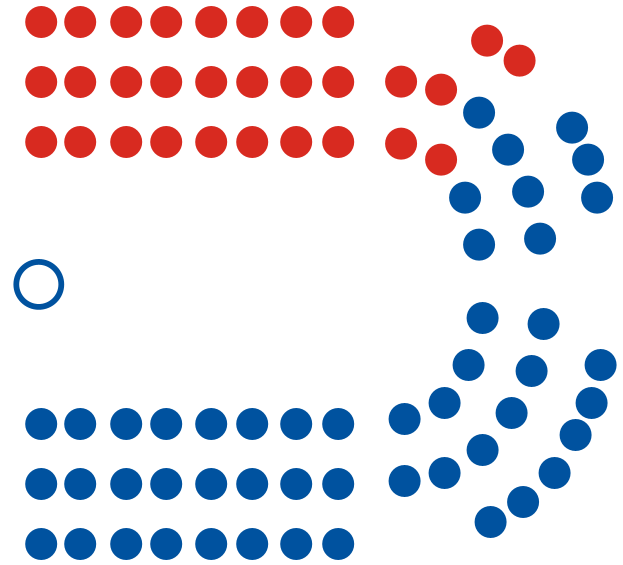
- Members: 80
- Speaker of the House: Matthew Oram
- Prime Minister: Sidney Holland
- Leader of the Opposition: Walter Nash

Sovereign
- Monarch: HM Elizabeth II — HM George VI until 6 February 1952
- Governor-General: HE Lt. Gen. The Lord Norrie from 2 December 1952 — HE Lt. Gen. The Lord Freyberg until 15 August 1952

The 30th New Zealand Parliament was a term of the New Zealand Parliament. It was elected at the 1951 general election on 1 September of that year.

== 1951 general election ==
The 1951 general election was held on Saturday, 1 September. A total of 80 MPs were elected; 49 represented North Island electorates, 27 represented South Island electorates, and the remaining four represented Māori electorates; this was the same distribution used since the 1946 election. 1,205,762 voters were enrolled and the official turnout at the election was 89.1%.

== Sessions ==
The 30th Parliament sat for five sessions (there were two sessions in 1954), and was prorogued on 4 October 1954.

| Session | Opened | Adjourned |
|---|---|---|
| first | 25 September 1951 | 6 December 1951 |
| second | 25 June 1952 | 24 October 1952 |
| third | 8 April 1953 | 27 November 1953 |
| fourth | 12 January 1954 | 13 January 1954 |
| fifth | 22 June 1954 | 1 October 1954 |

== Ministries ==
The National Party under Sidney Holland had been in power since the 1949 election, and Holland remained in charge until 1957, when he stepped down due to ill health.

== Overview of seats ==
The table below shows the number of MPs in each party following the 1951 election and at dissolution:

| Affiliation | Members | |
| Affiliation | At 1951 election | At dissolution |
|---|---|---|
| National Government | 50 | 50 |
| Labour Opposition | 30 | 30 |
| Total | 80 | 80 |
| Working Government majority | 20 | 20 |

Notes

- The Working Government majority is calculated as all Government MPs less all other parties.

== Initial composition of the 30th Parliament ==
The 1951 election saw the governing National Party re-elected with a twenty-seat margin, a substantial improvement on the twelve-seat margin it previously held. National won fifty seats compared with the Labour Party's thirty. The popular vote was closer, however, with National winning 54% to Labour's 46%. No seats were won by minor party candidates or by independents. This was the last New Zealand general election in which any party has ever captured a majority of the popular vote. Key
Labour National

Electorate results for the 1951 New Zealand general election
| Electorate | Incumbent | Winner | Majority | Runner up |
|---|---|---|---|---|
General electorates
| Arch Hill | Bill Parry | John Stewart | 3,965 | Paddy Hope |
| Ashburton | Geoff Gerard | | 2,867 | William Erle Rose |
| Auckland Central | Bill Anderton | | 2,168 | Peter Hillyer |
| Avon | John Mathison | | 4,212 | Douglas Warren Russell |
| Awarua | George Herron | | 3,755 | Neville Pickering |
| Bay of Plenty | Bill Sullivan | | 4,047 | Godfrey Santon |
| Brooklyn | Arnold Nordmeyer | | 1,826 | Charles William Clift |
| Buller | Jerry Skinner | | 1,227 | Phil McDonald |
| Central Otago | William Bodkin | | 3,620 | T A Rodgers |
| Christchurch Central | Robert Macfarlane | | 4,103 | Alma Schumacher |
| Clutha | James Roy | | 3,583 | J M Sanders |
| Dunedin Central | Phil Connolly | | 373 | Walter MacDougall |
| Dunedin North | Robert Walls | | 307 | Donald Cameron |
| Eden | Wilfred Fortune | | 2,802 | John Ronald Burfitt |
| Egmont | Ernest Corbett | | 4,896 | Brian Edgar Richmond |
| Fendalton | Sidney Holland | | 4,366 | Philip John Alley |
| Franklin | Jack Massey | | 5,358 | Arthur Faulkner |
| Gisborne | Reginald Keeling | Harry Dudfield | 338 | Reginald Keeling |
| Grey Lynn | Fred Hackett | | 3,813 | Harold Barry |
| Hamilton | Hilda Ross | | 2,252 | Ben Waters |
| Hastings | Sydney Jones | | 1,138 | Henry Edward Beattie |
| Hauraki | Andy Sutherland | | 4,468 | Brevat William Dynes |
| Hawke's Bay | Cyril Harker | | 4,153 | A Lowe |
| Hobson | Sidney Smith | | 5,337 | Norman King |
| Hurunui | William Gillespie | | 2,921 | Ed Cassidy |
| Hutt | Walter Nash | | 2,248 | Jack Andrews |
| Invercargill | Ralph Hanan | | 2,123 | F G Spurdle |
| Island Bay | Robert McKeen | | 1,680 | James Duncan |
| Karori | Charles Bowden | | 3,453 | Jim Bateman |
| Lyttelton | Terry McCombs | Harry Lake | 133 | Terry McCombs (Note: Terry McCombs was first on election night, but lost when special votes were included) |
| Manawatu | Matthew Oram | | 3,465 | B A Rodgers |
| Marlborough | Tom Shand | | 2,452 | Ted Meachen |
| Marsden | Alfred Murdoch | | 4,001 | Mervyn Allan Hosking |
| Miramar | Bob Semple | | 301 | Cuthbert Taylor |
| Mornington | Wally Hudson | | 3,783 | Richard Philling |
| Mount Albert | Warren Freer | | 604 | Reg Judson |
| Mount Victoria | Jack Marshall | | 2,198 | Frank Kitts |
| Napier | Tommy Armstrong | Peter Tait | 44 | Tommy Armstrong (Note: Tommy Armstrong was first on election night, but lost when special votes were included) |
| Nelson | Edgar Neale | | 2,831 | Stan Whitehead |
| New Plymouth | Ernest Aderman | | 2,335 | Clarence Robert Parker |
| North Shore | Dean Eyre | | 2,155 | Richard Wrathall |
| Oamaru | Thomas Hayman | | 1,315 | C J Ryan |
| Onehunga | Arthur Osborne | | 1,966 | Leonard Bradley |
| Onslow | Harry Combs | | 1,106 | John S Meadowcroft |
| Otahuhu | Leon Götz | | 2,128 | James Deas |
| Otaki | Jimmy Maher | | 1,142 | Phil Holloway |
| Pahiatua | Keith Holyoake | | 4,598 | Owen Jones |
| Palmerston North | Blair Tennent | | 200 | Joe Hodgens (Note: Joe Hodgens was first on election night, but lost when special votes were included) |
| Parnell | Duncan Rae | | 1,587 | Hugh Watt |
| Patea | William Sheat | | 2,467 | Frederick William Finer |
| Petone | Mick Moohan | | 2,135 | Norm Croft |
| Piako | Stan Goosman | | 6,364 | Gilbert Parsons Kenah |
| Ponsonby | Ritchie Macdonald | | 1,504 | Peter Dempsey |
| Raglan | Hallyburton Johnstone | | 1,766 | James Harrison Wilson |
| Rangitikei | Edward Gordon | | 3,677 | F A Dalzell |
| Remuera | Ronald Algie | | 5,346 | Bob Tizard |
| Riccarton | Angus McLagan | | 2,265 | Eric Philip Wills |
| Rodney | Clifton Webb | | 4,893 | Arthur Laurence Leaming |
| Roskill | John Rae | | 440 | Pat Curran |
| St Albans | Jack Watts | | 1,415 | John Bernard Mora |
| St Kilda | Fred Jones | Jim Barnes | 336 | Fred Jones |
| Selwyn | John McAlpine | | 1,836 | Jim Barclay |
| Sydenham | Mabel Howard | | 4,403 | Albert Hugh Stott |
| Tamaki | Eric Halstead | | 1,461 | Tom Skinner |
| Tauranga | Frederick Doidge | George Walsh | 5,400 | Hillary Joseph Pickett |
| Timaru | Clyde Carr | | 564 | William Leslie Richards |
| Waikato | Geoffrey Sim | | 6,369 | William Henry Bayly |
| Waimarino | Paddy Kearins | | 67 | Arthur MacPherson |
| Waimate | David Kidd | | 2,232 | A G Braddick |
| Wairarapa | Bert Cooksley | | 2,032 | George Anders Hansen |
| Waitakere | Rex Mason | | 641 | Robert Tapper |
| Waitomo | Walter Broadfoot | | 5,286 | J Dwyer |
| Wallace | Tom Macdonald | | 5,060 | J W Cleary |
| Wanganui | Joe Cotterill | | 226 | Ernest Victor O'Keefe |
| Wellington Central | Charles Chapman | | 277 | Berta Burns |
| Westland | Jim Kent | | 2,325 | Isabella Catherine Brown |
Māori electorates
| Eastern Maori | Tiaki Omana | | 3,706 | Turi Carroll |
| Northern Maori | Tapihana Paikea | | 2,132 | James Henare |
| Southern Maori | Eruera Tirikatene | | 659 | William Beaton |
| Western Maori | Iriaka Rātana | | 7,352 | Hoeroa Marumaru |

Table footnotes:

== By-elections during 30th Parliament ==
There were a number of changes during the term of the 30th Parliament.

| Electorate and by-election | | Date | Incumbent | Cause | Winner |
|---|---|---|---|---|---|
| Dunedin North | 1953 | 12 December | Robert Walls | Death | Ethel McMillan |
| Onehunga | 1953 | 19 December | Arthur Osborne | Death | Hugh Watt |
| Onslow | 1954 | 7 July | Harry Combs | Death | Henry May |
| Patea | 1954 | 31 July | William Sheat | Resignation | William Sheat |
