= 1954 Onslow by-election =

New Zealand by-election

| ← 1951 general | 7 July 1954 | 1954 general → |
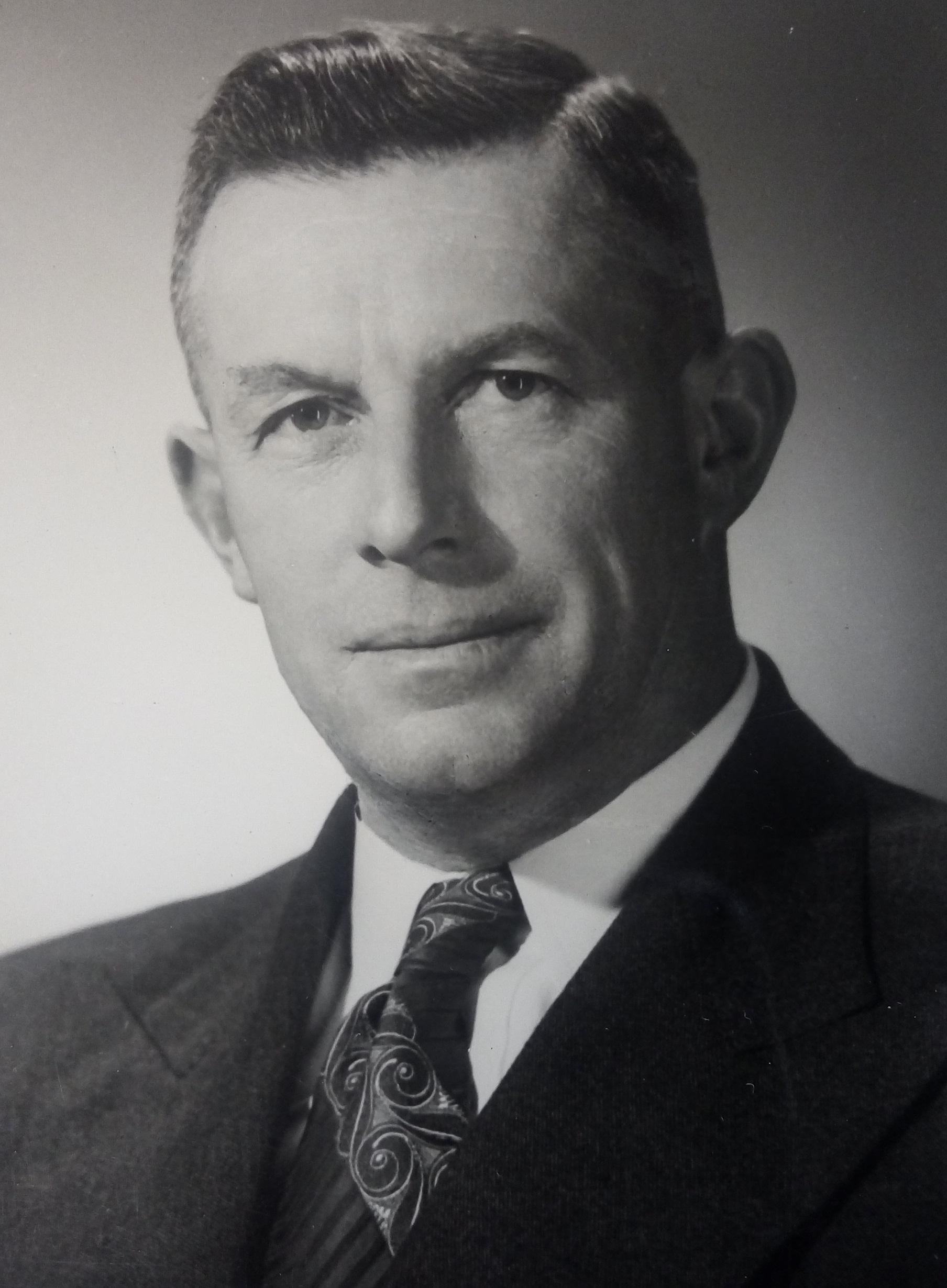
| Candidate | Henry May |
| Party | Labour |
| Popular vote | elected unopposed |
MP before election
Harry Combs
Labour
Elected MP
Henry May
Labour

The 1954 Onslow by-election was a by-election for the electorate of Onslow during the 30th New Zealand Parliament. It resulted from the death of the Labour Member of Parliament Harry Combs on 12 June 1954.

== Background ==
In February 1954 Combs announced he would retire at the general election later that year owing to ill health. As a result, Labour had already prepared to replace him in the electorate and at the time of Combs' death, Henry May, a member of the Petone Borough Council, had already been selected as the Labour candidate. May's selection had been something of a surprise as the former Labour Party president James Roberts was the other candidate. The National Party decided not to stand a candidate as it had already selected Wilfred Fortune (the sitting MP for Eden) to contest Onslow at the upcoming general election. National wanted to avoid confusion by putting up a proxy candidate and likewise did not wish to cause a by-election in Eden should Fortune be victorious. National had already faced selection difficulties with its expected candidate, Wellington City Council member Stewart Hardy, withdrawing before Fortune took his place. The newly created Social Credit Party also decided to not contest the by-election. The party head office issued a press statement that given the close proximity of the next general election there was little purpose contesting the seat.

The government intended it to coincide with the upcoming Patea by-election, even passing the Patea By-election Act 1954 to postpone it until the day of the Onslow by-election.

== Result ==
As a general election was due towards the end of 1954 (and was held on 13 November), the nominated Labour candidate Henry May was not opposed, so was declared elected (from midday on 7 July 1954) when the writs closed for candidates. It marked the last time, to date, that a candidate for the House of Representatives has been returned unopposed. As May was declared elected when the writs closed on 7 July it rendered the government's attempt to have the Patea election held back until 31 July pointless.

May first learned of his default victory via a telegram from Petone MP Mick Moohan inviting him to attend that evening's session of parliament. May did so and was sworn in as an MP that very evening. At the general election in November May defeated Fortune by 519 votes, confirming him as the MP.
