= 1954 Patea by-election =

New Zealand by-election

- 31 July 1954
- Turnout: 7,583 (50.12%)
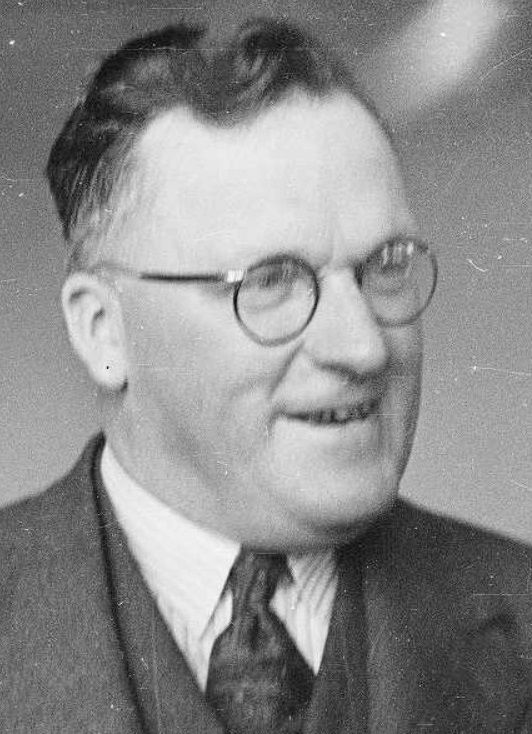

Candidate	William Sheat	Benjamin Winchcombe
Party	Independent	Labour
Popular vote	3,648	3,630
Percentage	48.11	47.87
MP before election
William Sheat
National
Elected MP
William Sheat
Independent

The 1954 Patea by election was held on 31 July during the 30th New Zealand Parliament, and was caused by the resignation of incumbent National MP, William Sheat.

== Background ==
William Sheat represented the Patea electorate between 1943 and 1954 as a National MP, but after a 1953 redistricting much of the Patea seat (including his residence) shifted to the Egmont electorate. The seat of Stratford had been recreated and the home of the incumbent MP for Egmont, Ernest Corbett, was now situated in Stratford. Sheat did not wish to represent the enlarged, mostly rural, Patea and thought it appropriate that he instead contest Egmont and Corbett contest Stratford. However Corbett was selected again in Egmont instead of Sheat, leading Sheat to accuse the local party electorate organiser of predetermining the candidacy. On 14 May 1954 he resigned his seat with the intention of winning it back at a by-election as an independent.

The writ for the by-election was originally issued on 3 June, but on 12 June Harry Combs (MP for Onslow) died, necessitating a second by-election. The government preferred both by-elections to be held at the same time so in order to postpone the Patea poll the government passed the Patea By-election Act 1954. However, as the Labour candidate in Onslow (Henry May) was unopposed he was declared elected when the writs closed, on 7 July.

== Candidates ==
Three candidates were nominated for the by-election:

Independent
William Sheat, a farmer from Hāwera. Sheat resigned from Parliament and as a National Party member on the question of party organisation in his electorate, subsequently labelling himself as "unofficial" National.

Labour
Benjamin Donald Winchcombe, the Town Clerk of the Ohakune Borough Council was selected as the Labour Party candidate. Prior to starting his employment as Ohakune's town clerk in 1949 he served in the Royal Navy during World War II.

Liberal
John Duggan, a Raetihi farmer (formerly of Hāwera), who was a member of what he called a "completely new party, the policy of which is based on the original Liberal ideals of Richard John Seddon." He was formerly a Raetihi Borough Councillor, who did not seek re-election in 1953, but at the time was contesting a council by-election at Raetihi.

National
The National Party decided not to contest the by-election after holding a specially-convened meeting of the old Patea electorate committee at Waverley on 29 June. After a discussion lasting for an hour and a half the decision was carried by delegates 108 votes to 14.

Social Credit
The Social Credit Party decided to not contest the Patea by-election. The party head office issued a press statement that given the close proximity of the next general election there was little purpose contesting the seat.

== Campaign ==
For the most part, both Sheat and Winchcombe had well-attended meetings to make addresses, though Duggan had difficulty inspiring interest in his ideas about the principles of Liberalism his campaign was centred on.

Despite breaking with National's party organisation, Sheat found himself still defending his former party's interests, albeit without any official backing. Other than restating his reasons for resigning and triggering the by-election, the rest of his speeches were defending the Government against Labour's criticisms (particularly with regards to financial policy). He still rallied many staunch local National supporters to support him, and was supported by small party committees and the central committee in Hāwera to assist with the organisation of his campaign.

Winchcombe was supported by some of Labour's most prominent MPs who spoke in his support at public meetings. Party leader Walter Nash spoke at his campaign launch meeting at Hāwera and his final meeting on at Wanganui. Party president Arnold Nordmeyer spoke at a meeting at Waverley early in the campaign, deputy leader Jerry Skinner spent a whole weekend in the electorate and spoke at a meeting in Patea, Ethel McMillan spoke at two meetings in Hāwera and Mick Moohan spoke at Patea. Labour's campaign speakers used the by-election criticising the Government, particularly on financial grounds, which had been a common area of criticism throughout the parliamentary session.

== Previous election ==
1951 general election: Patea
Party	Candidate	Votes	%	±%
National	William Sheat	7,910	59.24	
Labour	Frederick William Finer	5,443	40.76	
Majority		2,467	18.48	
Turnout		13,353	88.25	
Registered electors		15,131		
National hold		Swing		

== Results ==
The final vote count included 436 special votes, which were not included in the election-night results. Sheat's majority of 24 on election night was only 18 after the final count.

1954 Patea by-election
Party	Candidate	Votes	%	±%
Independent	William Sheat	3,648	48.11	−11.13
Labour	Benjamin Winchcombe	3,630	47.87	
Independent Liberal	John Duggan	305	4.02	
Majority		18	0.24	−18.24
Turnout		7,583	50.12	−38.13
Registered electors		15,131		
Independent gain from National		Swing		

Sheat subsequently did not stand in the 1954 general election but was returned to Parliament in the 1957 election as the MP for Egmont and he retired at the 1966 election.
