= Fraser Colman =

New Zealand politician

The Right Honourable Fraser Colman QSO
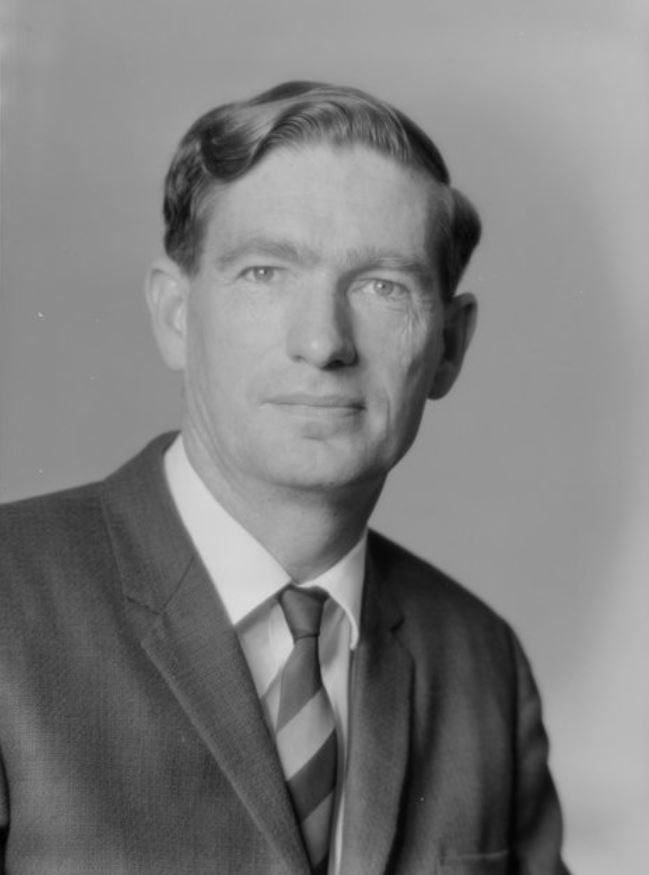
- Colman, c. 1967

31st Minister of Works and Development
- In office 26 July 1984 – 15 August 1987
- Prime Minister: David Lange
- Preceded by: Tony Friedlander
- Succeeded by: Richard Prebble

43rd Postmaster-General
- In office 10 September 1974 – 12 December 1975
- Prime Minister: Bill Rowling
- Preceded by: Roger Douglas
- Succeeded by: Hugh Templeton

37th Minister of Immigration
- In office 8 December 1972 – 12 December 1975
- Prime Minister: Norman Kirk; Bill Rowling
- Preceded by: David Thomson
- Succeeded by: Frank Gill

30th Minister of Mines
- In office 8 December 1972 – 12 December 1975
- Prime Minister: Norman Kirk; Bill Rowling
- Preceded by: Les Gandar
- Succeeded by: Eric Holland

Member of the New Zealand Parliament for Pencarrow Petone (1967–1978)
- In office 15 April 1967 – 15 August 1987
- Preceded by: Mick Moohan
- Succeeded by: Sonja Davies

Personal details
- Born: Fraser MacDonald Colman; 23 February 1925 Wellington, New Zealand
- Died: 11 April 2008 (aged 83) Lower Hutt, New Zealand
- Party: Labour
- Spouse: Noeline Jean Allen (m. 1958)
- Children: 4

Fraser MacDonald Colman QSO PC (23 February 1925 – 11 April 2008) was a New Zealand politician of the Labour Party. He represented the electorates of Petone from 1967 to 1978, and then when Petone was renamed, Pencarrow from 1978 to 1987, when he retired. He was the cabinet minister chosen to represent New Zealand in 1973 on its warships during their protest against the nuclear weapons testing carried out by France.

== Early life and family ==
Colman was born in Wellington on 23 February 1925, one of five children of Kenneth and Emily Colman. He attended primary school in Wellington before his family moved to Paraparaumu, where he went to Horowhenua College. Upon leaving school he found employment as a boilermaker at the firm of William Cables; he worked in that profession for 13 years.

He soon became active in the union movement, becoming a shop steward. He joined the Labour party, organising and distributing pamphlets and writing for the Labour Party newspaper, The Southern Cross.

In 1958, Colman married Noeline Jean Allen, after first meeting her in 1954, and the couple went on to have four children. They moved to Wainuiomata in 1959, where they built a home and lived the remainder of their life.

== Political career ==
New Zealand Parliament
| Years | Term | Electorate | Party |
|---|---|---|---|
| 1967–1969 | 35th | Petone | Labour |
| 1969–1972 | 36th | Petone | Labour |
| 1972–1975 | 37th | Petone | Labour |
| 1975–1978 | 38th | Petone | Labour |
| 1978–1981 | 39th | Pencarrow | Labour |
| 1981–1984 | 40th | Pencarrow | Labour |
| 1984–1987 | 41st | Pencarrow | Labour |

He served as campaign manager for Henry May in the Onslow electorate in 1954. In 1955 he became assistant general secretary of the Labour Party. He held the position until he was persuaded to stand for Labour in the by-election for the Petone electorate in 1967 following the death in office of Mick Moohan, its existing MP. He was elected in the 15 April 1967 by-election. He held Petone until it was abolished in 1978. He represented the Pencarrow electorate, which replaced Petone, from 1978 to 1987.

=== Third Labour Government ===
He was a Cabinet Minister in the third Labour Government. In the cabinet of Norman Kirk, he held the positions of Minister of Mines (1972–1974), Minister of Immigration (1972–1974), Associate Minister of Labour, and Associate Minister of Works. In the cabinet of Bill Rowling, he was Minister of Mines, Minister of Immigration and Postmaster-General (all 1974–1975).

=== Mururoa ===
In 1973 the government decided to dispatch a Royal New Zealand Navy frigate to protest against French nuclear testing on Mururoa Atoll in the South Pacific. It was decided that a cabinet minister should accompany the frigate to demonstrate the seriousness of the New Zealand government's position. Norman Kirk put all the Cabinet ministers' names into a hat and drew out the name of Colman. He departed from Auckland on 28 June aboard HMNZS Otago, which reached Mururoa a month later where he witnessed the first atmospheric test. Colman transferred to HMNZS Canterbury when it arrived to relieve the Otago, from which he witnessed the second French atmospheric test.

=== Opposition ===
Following the defeat of the Third Labour Government he held the position of Opposition Spokesman on Immigration. In 1977 he became Shadow Minister of Energy and in 1978 Shadow Minister for the Environment as well. A year later he was allocated the Housing portfolio by Rowling instead. Ahead of the 1981 election he was shifted to be Shadow Minister of Transport. After the election he became Shadow Minister of Works and Shadow Minister of Mines. When David Lange replaced Rowling as leader Colman retained the Works portfolio. He criticised the Muldoon Government for outsourcing the construction of many Think Big projects, including hiring foreign contractors at the Clyde Dam, rather than using the Ministry of Works and Development employees, stating the government "sacrificed the ministry to private enterprise."

=== Fourth Labour Government ===
In the fourth Labour Government, he again served as a cabinet minister holding the posts of Minister of Works and Development, Minister in Charge of the Earthquake and War Damages Commission, and Associate Minister of Energy. He ended the policy of the Muldoon Government of outsourcing works projects to contractors which he had previously been critical of. He also expanded the scope of the Ministry of Works and Development to include constructing irrigation infrastructure.

== Life after politics ==
Colman retired from Parliament at the 1987 election. He was replaced in Pencarrow by Sonja Davies. He was subsequently appointed as chairman of the New Zealand Fire Service Council for a three-year term.

Colman had a stroke in 1991. Another stroke in 1999 removed his ability to speak. He died on 11 April 2008, and was survived by his wife and three of their four daughters.

== Honours and awards ==
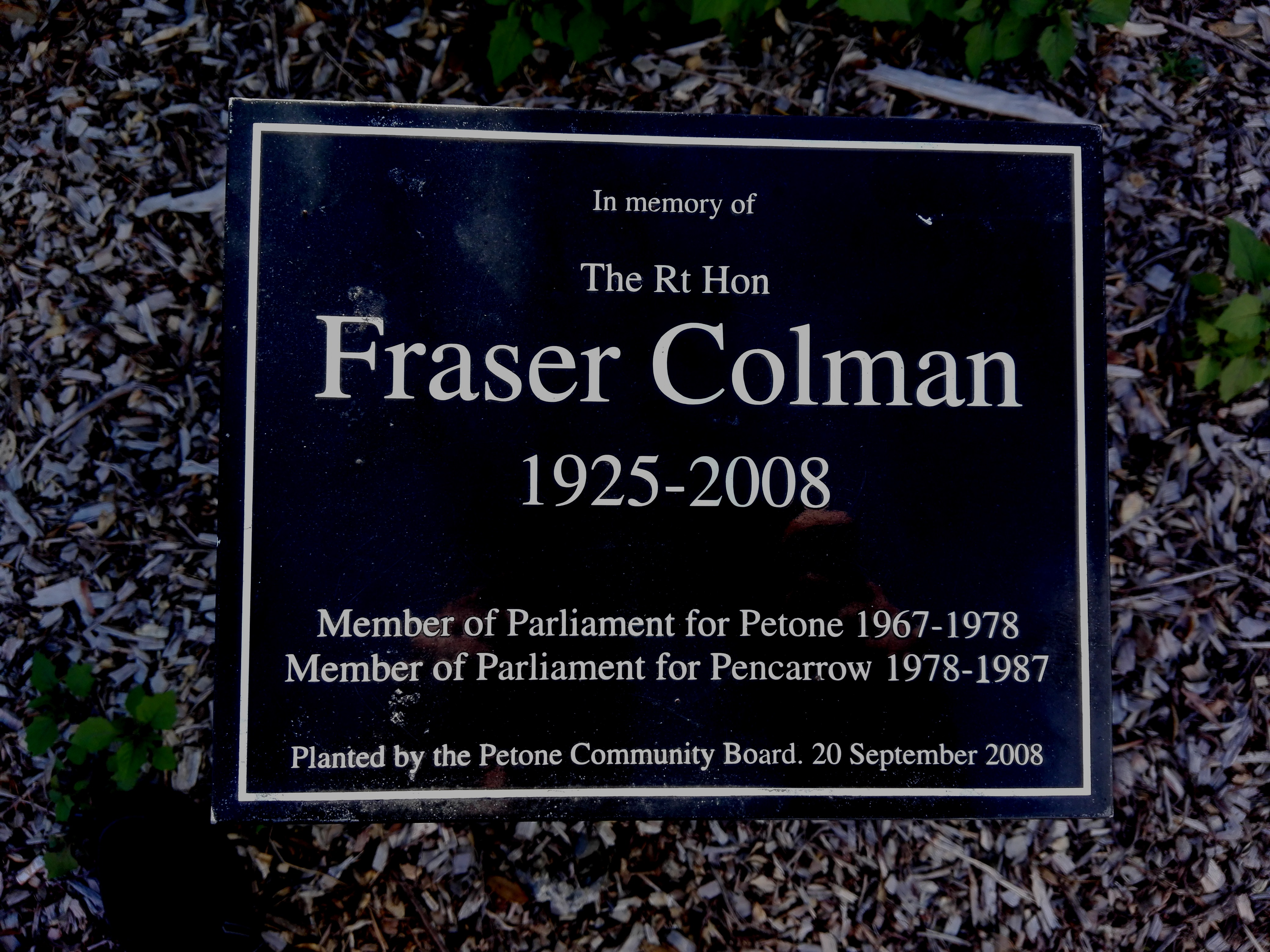
Plaque commemorating Colman

In 1977, Colman was awarded the Queen Elizabeth II Silver Jubilee Medal. He was appointed a member of the Privy Council in 1985, and in 1990 received the New Zealand 1990 Commemoration Medal. In the 1992 New Year Honours, Colman was made a Companion of the Queen's Service Order for public services. His wife, Noeline, had previously been appointed a Companion of the Queen's Service Order for community service in the 1987 Queen's Birthday Honours.

Colman was a life member of the Wellington Rugby League Club.

== Honorific eponym ==
Fraser Colman Grove, a street in Wainuiomata, is named after Colman.

== See also ==
- New Zealand's nuclear-free zone

== Notes ==
Political offices
| Preceded by Tony Friedlander | Minister of Works and Development; 1984–1987 | Succeeded by Richard Prebble |
| Preceded by Roger Douglas | Postmaster-General; 1974–1975 | Succeeded by Hugh Templeton |
| Preceded by David Thomson | Minister of Immigration; 1972–1975 | Succeeded by Frank Gill |
| Preceded by Les Gandar | Minister of Mines; 1972–1975 | Succeeded by Eric Holland |
New Zealand Parliament
| New constituency | Member of Parliament for Pencarrow; 1978–1987 | Succeeded by Sonja Davies |
| Preceded by Mick Moohan | Member of Parliament for Petone; 1967–1978 | Constituency abolished |
