= Annabel Young =

New Zealand politician (born 1956)

Member of the New Zealand Parliament for National party list
- In office 23 April 1997 – 27 July 2002
- Preceded by: Jim Gerard (Note: Normally, list MPs do not have individual predecessors or successors, but Gerard resigned during a sitting parliament and therefore was succeeded by Young.)

Personal details
- Born: Annabel Margaret Young; 1956 (age 69–70)
- Party: National
- Relations: Bill Young (father); Nicola Young (sister)

Annabel Margaret Young (born 1956) is a former New Zealand politician. She was a Member of Parliament from 1997 to 2002, representing the National Party.

== Early life and family ==
Before entering politics, Young worked as a tax specialist and business consultant, being a lawyer and chartered accountant. She also spent nine years in the territorial army signal corps.

Young's father, Bill Young, was also a National MP, representing the Miramar electorate from 1966 to 1981. One of Young's sisters, Nicola, is a Wellington City Councillor and stood as a candidate in the Rongotai electorate in the 2005 general election; however, lost to the incumbent, Annette King. Another sister, Rosemary, married National MP Max Bradford. Her great-grandfather was the early 20th-century Wellington mayor and Liberal–Reform MP John Luke.

== Member of Parliament ==
New Zealand Parliament
Years	Term	Electorate	List	Party
1997–1999	45th	List	28	National
1999–2002	46th	List	18	National

Young sought the National Party candidacy in the Wellington Central electorate for the 1996 general election but lost to Mark Thomas. Instead, she stood as a list-only candidate. Although she was not immediately successful, Young eventually entered Parliament on 23 April 1997, having been the next candidate on National's party list when list MP Jim Gerard resigned. As Gerard had been the first list MP to resign after New Zealand adopted the mixed-member proportional electoral system in 1996, Young was the first list MP to be elected not at a general election. She said her entry to Parliament in this way was ironic, given she had not supported the electoral system change that led to the introduction of list MPs.

In Young's first term as a list MP, despite being a Wellingtonian, she was assigned by the party to be based in Hawke's Bay. She was appointed the National Party spokesperson for senior citizens by the new leader, Jenny Shipley, in 1997. The National Party did not stand an electorate candidate in Wellington Central in the 1999 election (having previously endorsed ACT leader Richard Prebble for the seat). Young again stood as a list-only candidate, campaigning in Wellington city, and was re-elected. With the National Party now in opposition, Young served as National's revenue spokesperson under both Shipley and her successor, Bill English, based in Wellington.

In 2000, during a debate on the Employment Relations Bill, Young was photographed yawning, and the photograph was subsequently published in The Evening Post. This prompted Speaker of the House Jonathan Hunt to ban television cameras and newspaper photographers from the House of Representatives.

In the 2002 election, Young stood for a third time as a list-only candidate but, at 33rd on the list and the lowest of National's sitting MPs, was ranked too low to escape the collapse of National's vote that year. She had sought nomination as the National candidate for Wellington Central, but lost to Hekia Parata. Also at that election, Young endorsed the candidacy of Judith Collins—a long-time friend—for the National candidacy in the new Clevedon electorate, over sitting MP Warren Kyd.

== Life after parliament ==
After leaving Parliament, Young was tax director of the New Zealand Institute of Chartered Accountants. In 2005, she became chief executive of Federated Farmers, and in 2008, moved to the Pharmacy Guild of New Zealand as Chief Executive. She resigned from the Pharmacy Guild of New Zealand in April 2012 and later became executive director of the New Zealand Shipping Federation.

She has also written a book, The Good Lobbyist's Guide, about the most effective ways for citizens to become involved in the political process.
