= Pencarrow (disambiguation) =

Pencarrow is an English country house in Cornwall, England.

Pencarrow may also refer to the following places:

- Pencarrow, Advent, a hamlet in Advent parish, Cornwall, England
- Pencarrow (New Zealand electorate), a former electorate in New Zealand
- Pencarrow Head, a headland at the entrance to Wellington Harbour, New Zealand
- Pencarrow Head, Cornwall, a headland in Lanteglos-by-Fowey, Cornwall, England
