= 1967 Petone by-election =

New Zealand by-election

← 1966 general	15 April 1967	1969 general →
- Turnout: 12,977 (67.57%)
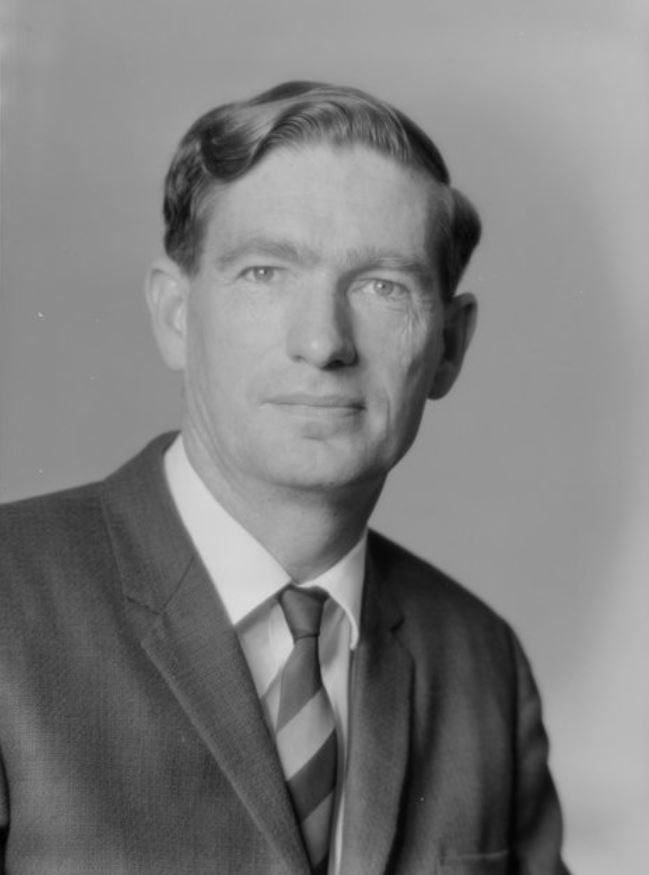

Candidate	Fraser Colman	Dick Martin	Colin Whitmill
Party	Labour	National	Social Credit
Popular vote	7,086	4,003	1,888
Percentage	54.60	30.84	14.54
MP before election
Mick Moohan
Labour
Elected MP
Fraser Colman
Labour

The 1967 Petone by-election was a by-election for the electorate of Petone on 15 April 1967 during the 35th New Zealand Parliament. The by-election resulted from the death of the previous member the Hon Mick Moohan on 7 February 1967. The by-election was won by Fraser Colman, also of the Labour Party.

It was held the same day as another by-election in Fendalton.

== Background ==
All three of the main political parties in New Zealand fielded candidates to contest the seat. At the time Petone was an electoral hive of activity with the local parliamentary seat becoming the third concurrent by-election in the area. There were also by-elections occurring for the local Maori seat, Southern Maori, following the death of Sir Eruera Tirikatene and the Petone mayoralty after Mayor Ralph Love was disqualified on a technicality.

== Candidates ==
Labour

Petone was a safe seat for Labour and therefore there were no shortage of nominees. At least 17 candidates came forward in the seat. The most prominent of whom were:

- Fraser Colman, the Labour Party's assistant general secretary and former president of the Boilermakers' Federation.
- John Jeffries, a lawyer and member of the Wellington City Council since 1962.
- Rolland O'Regan, a Wellington City Councillor since 1965 and former chairman of the Citizens' All Black Tour Association. He had contested Wellington Central in 1966.
- Olive Smuts-Kennedy, a lawyer and member of the Wellington City Council since 1965. She was Labour's candidate in Karori in 1960, Waimarino in 1963, Tauranga in 1966.
- Gerry Wall, a doctor who had contested Marlborough in 1966.

Both Bill Fox (a former MP who had lost Miramar in an upset in 1966) and Gerald O'Brien (a Wellington City Councillor and chairman of the Wellington Labour Representation Committee) were approached to stand, but declined. Fox cited his desire to retire and already having arrangements to move to Ōtaki, whilst O'Brien indicated that the demands of running his business would be incompatible with a parliamentary candidature.

Eventually Colman was selected to stand as Labour's candidate.

National

Richard Maunsell "Dick" Martin of Eastbourne was selected to contest the seat for the National Party. Martin had stood in Petone for National unsuccessfully in the 1960 general election where he had reduced Moohan's majority.

Social Credit

The Social Credit Party chose Colin James Whitmill, a civil servant working for the Ministry of Justice, as its candidate. Whitmill had contested Petone at the previous election.

== Results ==
The following table gives the election results:

1967 Petone by-election
Party	Candidate	Votes	%	±%
Labour	Fraser Colman	7,086	54.60	
National	Dick Martin	4,003	30.84	
Social Credit	Colin Whitmill	1,888	14.54	+2.43
Majority		3,083	23.75	
Turnout		12,977	67.57	−20.17
Registered electors		19,203		
Labour hold		Swing		
