= Joy Quigley =

New Zealand politician

Joy Quigley QSO
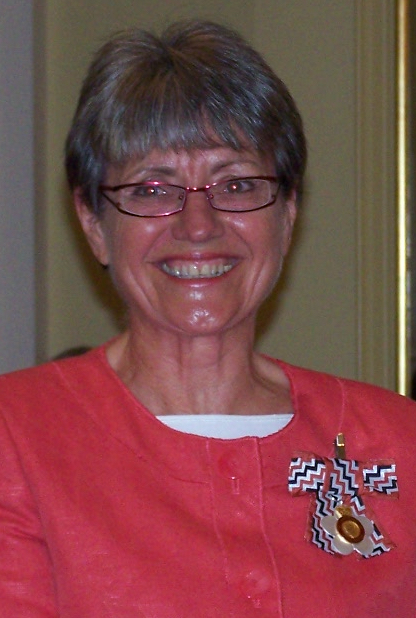
- Quigley in 2008

Member of the New Zealand Parliament for Western Hutt
- In office 1990–1996
- Preceded by: John Terris
- Succeeded by: discontinued constituency

Member of the New Zealand Parliament for National Party list
- In office 1996–1999

Personal details
- Born: 9 May 1948 (age 77) Geraldine, New Zealand
- Party: National
- Spouse(s): 1. Al McLauchlan; (m. 1969; div. 1997): 2. John Hunt

Marilyn Joy Quigley QSO (born 9 May 1948), also known as Joy McLauchlan, is a former New Zealand politician.

== Early life and family ==
Quigley was born in Geraldine on 9 May 1948, the daughter of Jessie Isobel Quigley (née Scott) and Maurice Quigley. She was educated at Geraldine High School, and went on to study at the University of Otago, completing a Diploma of Physical Education in 1967. She later was awarded a Teacher Taining Certificate in 1980, having studied at the Hutt Valley campus of Christchurch Teachers' College, and also took papers towards a Bachelor of Education at Massey University.

In 1969, Quigley married Alistair John McLauchlan, and the couple had two children before divorcing in 1997. She reverted to her maiden name in 1998.

== Political career ==
New Zealand Parliament
Years	Term	Electorate	List	Party
1990–1993	43rd	Western Hutt		National
1993–1996	44th	Western Hutt		National
1996–1999	45th	List	13	National

She spent several years overseas with her husband and family, before first standing for the National Party in the 1984 election. Quigley was an MP from 1990 to 1999, representing the National Party. She was first elected to Parliament in the 1990 election as MP for Western Hutt, defeating Labour's John Terris. She had previously stood in Eastern Hutt in the 1984 election and Western Hutt in the 1987 election, and had worked as a parliamentary secretary to prominent National MPs such as John Banks, George Gair, Don McKinnon and Ruth Richardson. She remained MP for Western Hutt until the seat was abolished in the 1996 election, the first MMP election. She then contested the new seat of Hutt South, but was defeated by Labour's Trevor Mallard. She remained in Parliament as a list MP, but left politics at the 1999 election.

In 1993, she was awarded the New Zealand Suffrage Centennial Medal.

== Outside politics ==
Quigley served as executive director for the Independent Schools of New Zealand from 2000 to 2008.

In the 2008 Queen's Birthday Honours, Quigley was appointed a Companion of the Queen's Service Order, for public services.

In 2009, Quigley was one of three people appointed by the Government to the High Cost Highly Specialised Medicines Review. She now lives in Kerikeri with her second husband, John Hunt.

New Zealand Parliament
Preceded by John Terris	Member of Parliament for Western Hutt; 1990–1996	Constituency abolished
