= Henry May (New Zealand politician) =

New Zealand politician (1912–1995)

The Honourable Henry May QSO
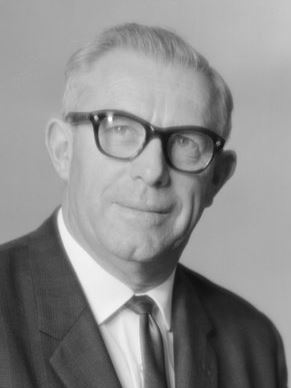

20th Minister of Internal Affairs
- In office 8 December 1972 – 12 December 1975
- Prime Minister: Norman Kirk; Bill Rowling
- Preceded by: Allan Highet
- Succeeded by: Allan Highet

2nd Minister of Local Government
- In office 8 December 1972 – 12 December 1975
- Prime Minister: Norman Kirk; Bill Rowling
- Preceded by: Allan Highet
- Succeeded by: Allan Highet

28h Minister of Civil Defence
- In office 10 September 1974 – 12 December 1975
- Prime Minister: Bill Rowling
- Preceded by: Tom McGuigan
- Succeeded by: Allan Highet

Member of the New Zealand Parliament
- In office 7 July 1954 – 29 November 1975
- Preceded by: Harry Combs
- Succeeded by: Bill Lambert
- Constituency: Onslow (1954–63); Porirua (1963–69); Western Hutt (1969–75)

Personal details
- Born: Henry Leonard James May; 13 April 1912 Petone, New Zealand
- Died: 22 April 1995 (aged 83) Waikanae, New Zealand
- Party: Labour Party
- Spouses: Annie McNeill (m. 1940; died 1967) Doreen Langton (m. 1970)
- Children: 4
- Profession: Engineer

Henry Leonard James May QSO (13 April 1912 – 22 April 1995) was a New Zealand politician of the Labour Party. He was a cabinet minister from 1972 to 1975.

== Biography ==
=== Early life and career ===
May was born in Petone in 1912. He attended Petone convent school. He left school at 13 and found employment with Lever Brothers, later studying engineering part-time at Wellington Technical College. He then gained a job at the New Zealand Railways Department in the late 1920s, where soon after his wages were cut by 10% as part of the retrenchment policies of the United–Reform coalition government. He was also member of the Amalgamated Society of Railway Servants. At the outbreak of World War II his position with the railways was classified as a reserved occupation and he was ineligible to serve overseas. He subsequently served in the volunteer fire brigade to help fill the void of men that were overseas. After the war he left the railways and became the caretaker of the Petone waterworks.

His family were active in the Trade union movement and he was involved in politics from his days at school. His first political involvement was when he was aged only 7 years old when he held oil lamps to light a street-corner stump speech for Labour MP Bob Semple on the corner of Jackson Street and Richmond Street during the 1919 election. Throughout the 1920s he delivered Labour Party leaflets and attended party meetings with his grandfather Chip Oakley, a local baker. By the 1930s he was a local organiser and electorate secretary.

=== Political career ===
New Zealand Parliament
Years	Term	Electorate	Party
1954	30th	Onslow	Labour
1954–1957	31st	Onslow	Labour
1957–1960	32nd	Onslow	Labour
1960–1963	33rd	Onslow	Labour
1963–1966	34th	Porirua	Labour
1966–1969	35th	Porirua	Labour
1969–1972	36th	Western Hutt	Labour
1972–1975	37th	Western Hutt	Labour

From 1947 to 1956 he was a member of the Petone Borough Council. As a councillor he was opposed to the proposed amalgamation of Petone with Lower Hutt. He was also a member of the Hutt River Board and Hutt Power and Gas Board. He then transitioned to national politics, representing the Wellington area electorates of Onslow from a 1954 by-election to 1963, then Porirua from 1963 to 1969, then Western Hutt from 1969 to 1975.

In February 1954 long-serving Labour MP Harry Combs announced he would retire at the general election later that year owing to ill health. Combs died before the election, on 12 June, prompting a by-election. May won the Labour nomination to replace him on Onslow, something of a surprise as the influential former Labour Party president James Roberts was the other main candidate. The National Party decided not to stand a candidate and May won the seat unopposed. May first learned of his default victory via a telegram from Petone MP Mick Moohan inviting him to attend that evening's session of parliament. May did so and was sworn in as an MP that very evening. At the general election in November May defeated Wilfred Fortune (the retiring MP for Eden) by 519 votes, confirming him as the MP.

He served as Labour's senior whip from 1958 to 1972. As senior whip during the Second Labour Government, which had a working majority of one, May became the "numbers man" and was tasked with ensuring that whenever the house divided the government had a majority present in the house. He was chairman of Parliament's Local Bills Committee which in 1960 produced the "May Report" recommending New Zealand adopt regional councils and fewer borough councils and local authorities.

In 1951 he was elected a member of the Labour Party executive. In 1963 he stood unsuccessfully for the Labour Party vice-presidency but was beaten by Norman Kirk. He stood again in 1966 and was successful, holding the office for three years until 1969 when he was defeated by Bill Rowling.

After the formation of the Third Labour Government May stood for the cabinet and was tied for the final place in the caucus ballot with Ron Bailey (whom he had shared an office with for many years) with May narrowly winning. Prime Minister Norman Kirk regretted two friends being pitted against one another but was relieved when Bailey took the defeat graciously. May was appointed by Kirk as Minister of Internal Affairs and Minister of Local Government from 1972 to 1975. In 1974 he gained additional responsibility as Minister of Civil Defence. As Minister of Internal Affairs he was a patron of the arts. He increased the funding for the Queen Elizabeth II Arts Council 127% and boosted the Historic Places Trust funding by an extra $63,000 as well. His main accomplishment as a minister was restructuring New Zealand's local government setup in 1974, largely inspired by the "May Report" over a decade earlier.

Following Norman Kirk's death he was responsible for organising his state funeral. May also created the New Zealand Fire Service in 1975, merging the 26 permanent and 251 volunteer fire brigades in co-operation with Sir Jack Hunn.

The Labour government was unexpectedly defeated at the 1975 general election and May lost his ministerial roles. May was also unexpectedly defeated by Bill Lambert in the Western Hutt electorate. While initially ahead of Lambert by the slender margin of 8 votes his position was tenuous with over one thousand special votes yet to be counted and the overall nationwide swing to National counting against him. Nevertheless May pointed to the fact that in every previous election he had gained votes after specials were counted and stated "I am not throwing in the towel yet". Ultimately he was defeated after the final count was made however finishing 168 votes (only 0.88%) behind Lambert.

=== Later life and death ===
Following his defeat, May moved to Waikanae with his second wife, Doreen, and became a gardener in his retirement. He was appointed a Companion of the Queen's Service Order for public services in the 1976 Queen's Birthday Honours.

May died on 22 April 1995, aged 83 years. He was survived by his second wife Doreen and four children.

== Family and personal life ==
In 1940 he married his first wife Mary Anne McNeill and built their own home in Korokoro. They had four children and were married for 27 years before Annie died in a car accident in May 1967 on Hutt Road. He later remarried to Doreen Langton, who died in 2010.

His brother, Josiah Robert Philip May, was also a Petone Borough Councillor who had played rugby for Wellington B and had married Henry's wife Annie's sister Theresa Winifred McNeill. First elected in 1950, he was deputy mayor of Petone under mayor Annie Huggan but was later dropped from the Labour ticket (along with Huggan) at the 1965 local elections. He was re-elected to the council as an independent (unlike Huggan who was defeated) and continued as deputy mayor on a majority independent council under new mayor Ralph Love. When Love was disqualified from the mayoralty in January 1967 Joe became acting mayor until a by-election could be held. Joe May declined to stand for mayor himself and Love resumed the mayoralty after winning the by-election in March 1967.

== Notes ==
New Zealand Parliament
Preceded by Harry Combs	Member of Parliament for Onslow; 1954–1963	Vacant Constituency abolished, recreated in 1993 Title next held by Peter Dunne
Vacant Constituency recreated after abolition in 1870 Title last held by Alfred Brandon	Member of Parliament for Porirua; 1963–1969	Succeeded by Gerry Wall
New constituency	Member of Parliament for Western Hutt; 1969–1975	Succeeded by Bill Lambert
Political offices
Preceded by Allan Highet	Minister of Internal Affairs; 1972–1975	Succeeded by Allan Highet
Preceded by Allan Highet	Minister of Local Government; 1972–1975	Succeeded by Allan Highet
Preceded by Tom McGuigan	Minister of Civil Defence; 1974–1975	Succeeded by Allan Highet
Party political offices
Preceded by Joe Cotterill	Senior Whip of the Labour Party; 1958–1972	Succeeded by Ron Barclay
Preceded by Jim Bateman	Vice-President of the Labour Party; 1966–1969	Succeeded by Bill Rowling
