= John Terris =

New Zealand politician (1939–2026)

The Reverend John Terris QSO
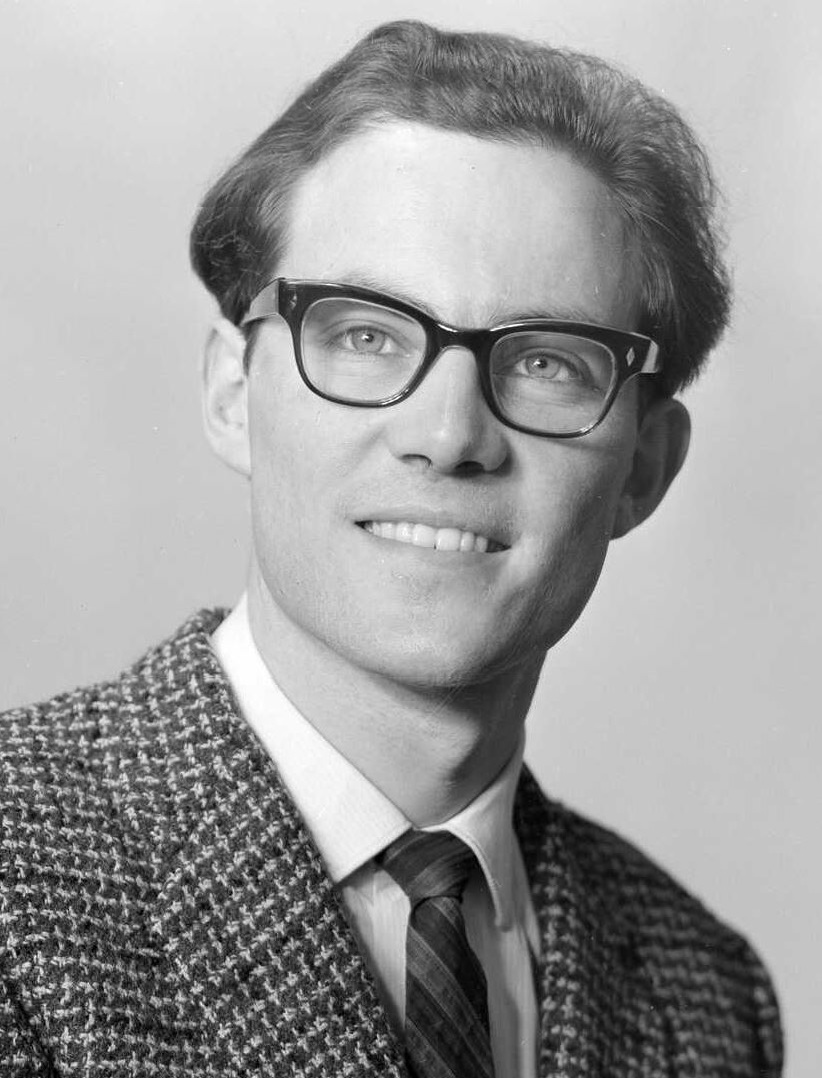
- Terris in 1964

16th Mayor of Lower Hutt
- In office 31 October 1995 – 10 October 2004
- Preceded by: Glen Evans
- Succeeded by: David Ogden

Member of the New Zealand Parliament for Western Hutt
- In office 25 November 1978 – 27 October 1990
- Preceded by: Bill Lambert
- Succeeded by: Joy McLauchlan

Personal details
- Born: John James Terris; 19 June 1939 Wanganui, New Zealand
- Died: 2 February 2026 (aged 86) Lower Hutt, New Zealand
- Party: Labour (1975–1993)
- Occupation: Broadcaster

John James Terris QSO (19 June 1939 – 2 February 2026) was a New Zealand politician, Anglican priest and broadcaster who represented the Labour Party in the New Zealand parliament from 1978 to 1990. He was Chairman of Committees of the House of Representatives from 1984 to 1990. From 1995 to 2004, he was mayor of Lower Hutt.

== Life and career ==
=== Early life and career ===
Terris was born in Wanganui in 1939 to Alexander Roderick Terris and his wife Rosa Maria (née Donovan) and attended New Plymouth Boys' High School. Terris also attended St John's Theological College and attained a diploma. In 1970, he was ordained by the Anglican Church as a Worker Priest. He was a member Lower Hutt Family Centre Trust and a convenor of the Hutt Youth Drop-In Centre Management Committee.

He became active in broadcasting on both radio and television. He had been employed at various stages as an announcer, interviewer, and executive producer. He was also a trade unionist and was employed at the Public Service Association as a senior advocate.

=== Member of Parliament ===
New Zealand Parliament
Years	Term	Electorate	Party
1978–1981	39th	Western Hutt	Labour
1981–1984	40th	Western Hutt	Labour
1984–1987	41st	Western Hutt	Labour
1987–1990	42nd	Western Hutt	Labour

He became involved in the Labour Party and became chairman of the Hutt Labour Electorate Committee. In 1977, Terris was elected a member of the Lower Hutt City Council on the Labour Party ticket. His wife was initially supposed to stand, but after she had to withdraw her candidacy, he filled her slot on the ticket. He served as the chairman of the council's Management Resources committee and a member of the Dowse Art Gallery and Museum management committee. He was the only Labour member re-elected to the council in 1980 and "topped the poll" in 1983 with more votes than any other candidate. Consequently he was nominated for the position of deputy mayor. He lost in a ballot among fellow councillors to Teri Puketapu of the United Citizens ticket (which held the majority on the council). In 1989, he retired from the city council.

Terris was first elected as the member for Western Hutt in 1978. In 1979, he was appointed Labour's spokesperson for Broadcasting. In 1981, he was additionally appointed spokesperson on Internal Affairs. As opposition spokesperson on broadcasting he aroused the ire of the Left (chiefly Jim Anderton and Fran Wilde) by saying that there should also be a private channel and was accused of "political incorrectness". So, he was then given "Internal Affairs", a shadow portfolio generally reserved for "caucus down-and-outs".

In 1984, he was not selected for Cabinet but was given the "consolation prize" of Deputy Speaker (hence also Acting Speaker), and Chairman of Committees of the House of Representatives from 1984 to 1990. In May 1990, Terris submitted a private members bill to force a binding referendum on the electoral system. His bill was defeated but a referendum eventually occurred in 1992.

In January 1986, Terris was convicted of drink-driving. He lost his driver's licence for six months.

Terris represented the Western Hutt electorate until 1990, when he was defeated by National's Joy McLauchlan, one of a number of losses contributing to the fall of the Fourth Labour Government. After losing his seat in Parliament he shifted to Wanganui to fill the post of vicar at St Peter's Anglican parish. He also returned to broadcasting and was a talkback host for Radio Liberty. When Mike Moore was dumped as Labour Party leader in 1993 for Helen Clark he left the party feeling disaffected with its direction. He was briefly involved with establishing ACT New Zealand, a new party headed by former Labour MP Roger Douglas, but soon left the party.

=== Mayor of Lower Hutt ===
In March 1995, Terris resigned his post with the church in Wanganui and returned to Lower Hutt. He stood for Mayor of Lower Hutt at the 1995 local elections and was successful. He is the only person ever to have been both MP and mayor in the Hutt Valley (another mayor Thomas William McDonald was an MP, but was MP for the Wairarapa electorate outside the Hutt Valley). He served as mayor until 2004 when he was defeated by former councillor David Ogden. His re-election campaign suffered greatly when was hospitalised with blood poisoning at the start of the election leaving him little time or energy to campaign.

=== Outside politics ===
An ordained Anglican priest, Terris spent his early working life in radio and television. As of 2013, Terris served as the President of Media Matters in NZ, an advocacy group which campaigns against what it regards as gratuitous sex and violence in the electronic media. He published his autobiography Being Who You Are in 2004.

In 2013, he published a handbook on How To Make a Speech and How To Run A Meeting. His latest book, released in July 2014 and called September Showdown is a light-hearted look at the perils of a parliamentary career. He had an interest in heritage issues and regularly contributed to the Radio New Zealand programme Sounds Historical. Terris has also produced a series of six video documentaries on local subjects called Village to City, as well as a series of six interviews with local Hutt people who lived through World War II, both of which he has donated to the Hutt City Libraries.

In the 1990 New Year Honours, Terris was appointed a Companion of the Queen's Service Order for public services, and in 1990 he was also awarded the New Zealand 1990 Commemoration Medal. He was awarded Rotary Paul Harris Fellowships in 2005 and 2018.

In the 2024 New Year Honours, Terris's second wife, Katie Terris, was awarded the Queen's Service Medal, for services to the community and the arts.

=== Death ===
Terris died in Lower Hutt on 2 February 2026, at the age of 86.

== Notes ==
Political offices
Preceded by Glen Evans	Mayor of Lower Hutt; 1995–2004	Succeeded by David Ogden
Preceded by Jack Luxton	Chairman of Committees of the House of Representatives; 1984–1990	Succeeded by Jim Gerard
New Zealand Parliament
Preceded by Bill Lambert	Member of Parliament for Western Hutt; 1978–1990	Succeeded by Joy McLauchlan
