= Bill Young (New Zealand politician) =

New Zealand politician (1913–2009)

The Honourable Bill Young CMG
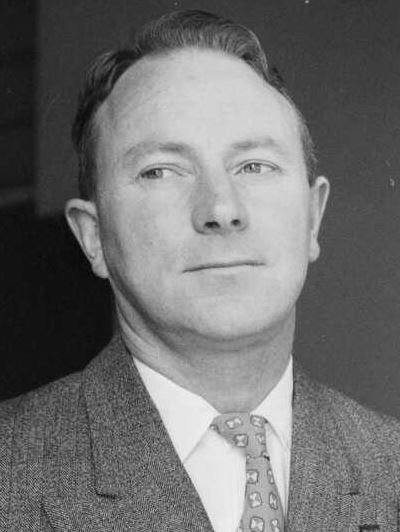
- Young in 1959

16th High Commissioner to the United Kingdom
- In office 27 September 1982 – 21 February 1985
- Prime Minister: Robert Muldoon
- Preceded by: Les Gandar
- Succeeded by: Joe Walding

3rd Minister of Works and Development
- In office 12 December 1975 – 11 December 1981
- Prime Minister: Robert Muldoon
- Preceded by: Mick Connelly
- Succeeded by: Derek Quigley

Member of the New Zealand Parliament for Miramar
- In office 26 November 1966 – 28 November 1981
- Preceded by: Bill Fox
- Succeeded by: Peter Neilson

Personal details
- Born: 13 November 1913 Kawakawa, New Zealand
- Died: 14 July 2009 (aged 95) Wellington, New Zealand
- Party: National
- Spouse: Joan Luke (m. 1946)
- Children: 5
- Relatives: Annabel Young (daughter); Nicola Young (daughter); Max Bradford (son-in-law)

William Lambert Young CMG (13 November 1913 – 14 July 2009) was a New Zealand politician representing the National Party.

== Biography ==
=== Early life and career ===
Young was born in Kawakawa in 1913, the son of James Young. He attended Ngawha Native School, 27 kilometres (17 mi) from Kawakawa, where his parents were teachers, and then Wellington College. After his education he worked for stock and station agents Murray Roberts Company Limited.

From 1941 to 1943 he served in World War II with the 2nd New Zealand Division in North Africa, and was invalided home after the workshop section in Egypt was bombed.

He then resumed work at Murray Roberts Company Limited until 1946, then music retailer Beggs (1946–1956), and was general manager of manufacturer/retailer Radio Corporation of New Zealand (1956–1966). Young was active with the New Zealand Automobile Association and was vice-president of the Wellington AA, and a member of the council of the North Island AA. He was a member of the Wellington Chamber of Commerce and a director of several companies.

=== Political career ===
New Zealand Parliament
Years	Term	Electorate	Party
1966–1969	35th	Miramar	National
1969–1972	36th	Miramar	National
1972–1975	37th	Miramar	National
1975–1978	38th	Miramar	National
1978–1981	39th	Miramar	National

By the 1960 he was an active member of the National Party and was on the executive of the Wellington Central electorate committee. He was later chairman of the party's Wellington Division and a member of the party Dominion Council from 1964 to 1966. He had long been interested in politics and noted for his debating and public speaking ability. He was approached to stand for Mayor of Wellington ahead of the 1962 election, but after giving consideration to doing so, he declined to stand.

Instead he set his sights on national politics and in 1963 he stood for National for the Miramar electorate against Bill Fox, a former Labour Party cabinet minister. While reducing Fox's majority he was unsuccessful. He stood again in 1966, edging out Fox by a small 146 vote margin.

In opposition from 1974 to 1975 he was National's spokesman for roading and women's rights.

From 1975 to 1981 he served in the Third National Government as Minister of Works. His portfolio allocation was owed to his lifetime interest in construction and knowledge of hydro-electric power development. He was also a strong advocate for the completion of the Wellington Urban Motorway and up until his death he continued to advocate the benefits of a second Mount Victoria Tunnel.

Young lost his seat in 1981, and was then appointed on the recommendation of Prime Minister Robert Muldoon to the post of New Zealand High Commissioner to Great Britain, and Nigeria, and Ambassador to Ireland. Wellington newspaper The Evening Post editorialised at the time that the appointment was "out- of-the-blue" but popular and he became known as capable and affable in the role. At the time New Zealand was regarded well in London due to lending its support in the Falklands War. His main focus was assisting New Zealand trade emissaries as they argued for continued access to British markets for agricultural products following a European Commission proposal to slash the butter quota.

=== Later life and death ===
He was the president of the Star Boating Club and also a patron of the Company of Musical Players. He was a member of the Tararua Tramping Club and New Zealand Amateur Rowing Association.

In the 1992 New Year Honours, he was made a Companion of the Order of St Michael and St George, for public services.

He died in Wellington in 2009.

== Personal life and family ==
Young married Isobel Joan Luke, the daughter of George Luke, in 1946. His wife Joan came from a prominent Wellington political family – her grandfather (Sir John Luke) and great uncle (Sir Charles Luke) had both been local parliamentarians and Wellington mayors. They had five children together: James, Christine, Rosemary, Nicola and Annabel.

Rosemary Young (later Young-Rouse after marrying Michael Rouse) was a member of the Wellington City Council from 1974 to 1987 when she resigned mid-term after relocating to Auckland. She was an active National Party member and stood as a National candidate for parliament in 1978 and 1984 in the Eastern Hutt and Wellington Central electorates respectively. She later re-married to National cabinet minister Max Bradford.

Annabel Young was a list Member of Parliament for the National Party from 1997 until 2002.

Nicola Young is also a Wellington City Councillor (since 2013) and also stood as a National candidate in the Rongotai electorate at the 2005 election.

== Notes ==
Diplomatic posts
Preceded by Les Gandar	High Commissioner of to the United Kingdom; 1982–1985	Succeeded by Joe Walding
Political offices
Preceded by Mick Connelly	Minister of Works and Development; 1975–1981	Succeeded by Derek Quigley
New Zealand Parliament
Preceded by Bill Fox	[Miramar](New Zealand electorate); 1966–1981	Succeeded by Peter Neilson
