= Sonja Davies =

New Zealand politician and trade unionist (1923–2005)

Sonja Davies ONZ JP
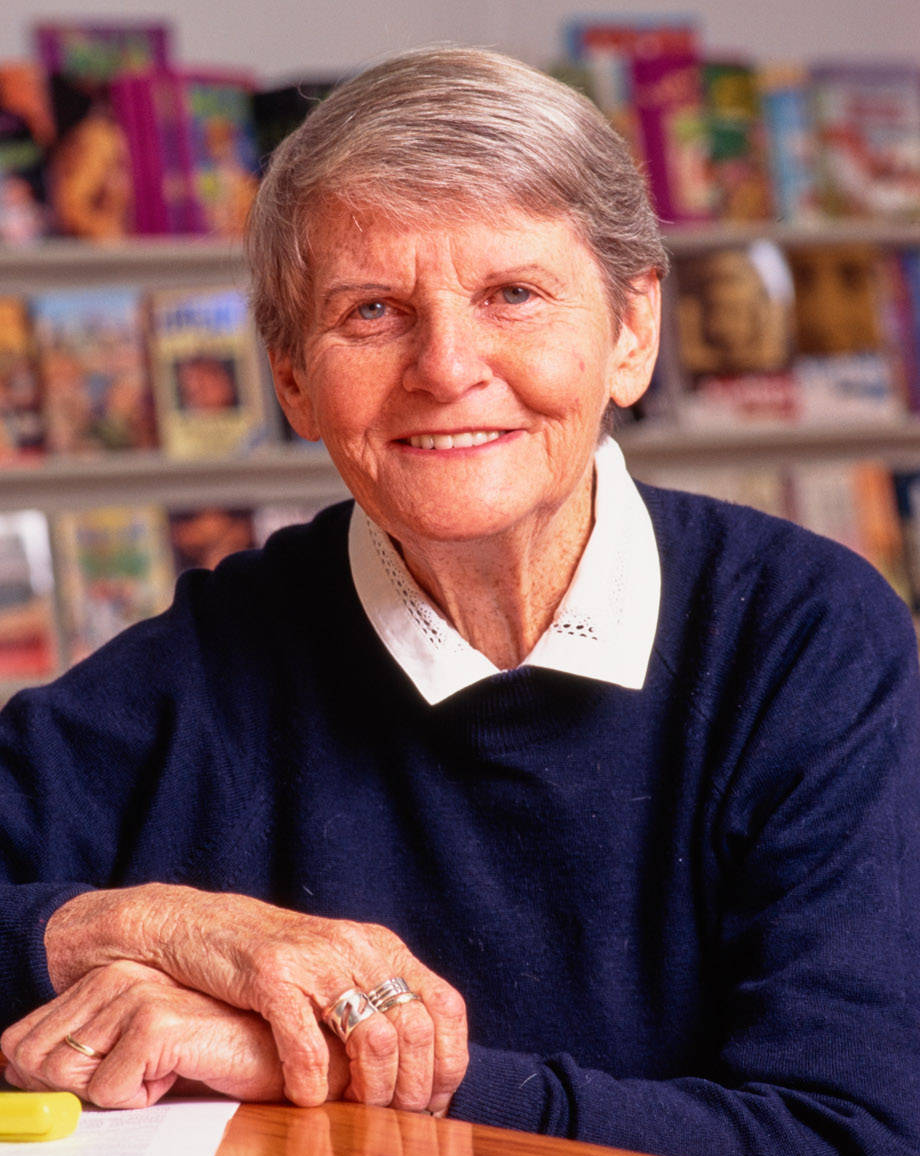

Member of the New Zealand Parliament for Pencarrow
- In office 15 August 1987 – 6 November 1993
- Preceded by: Fraser Colman
- Succeeded by: Trevor Mallard

Personal details
- Born: Sonja Margaret Loveday Vile; 11 November 1923 Wallaceville, New Zealand
- Died: 12 June 2005 (aged 81) Wellington, New Zealand
- Party: Labour
- Relations: Job Vile (great-grandfather)

Sonja Margaret Loveday Davies ONZ JP (née Vile; 11 November 1923 – 12 June 2005) was a New Zealand trade unionist, peace campaigner, and Member of Parliament. On 6 February 1987, Davies was the third appointee to the Order of New Zealand.

== Early life ==
Sonja Vile was born in the Upper Hutt suburb of Wallaceville in 1923. Her mother was Gwladys Ilma Vile, a nurse, and a granddaughter of Job Vile.

Sonja Vile learned of her father's identity, Gerald Dempsey, when she was 20, but never made any contact. She had four different foster homes before her grandparents took her in, and they lived in Oamaru and Woodville. Aged seven, she went back to her mother in Wellington to live with her younger sister and her new step-father. The family moved to Dunedin, then Auckland, and, in 1939, back to Wellington. By this time, she also had a younger brother. The speeches by pacifists Ormond Burton and Archibald Barrington appealed to her social conscience but caused tension with her parents, and she consequently left home aged 16 supporting herself by work in bookshops.

She married Lindsay Nathan in 1941, and began training as a nurse. She became pregnant after an affair with an American marine and her daughter Penny was born in 1944. Soon afterwards, Sonja was hospitalised for tuberculosis.

== Nelson ==
After divorcing Nathan, she married Charlie Davies in late 1946, who she had known before the war. The following year she was discharged from hospital, and the couple moved to rural Nelson. In 1953 they moved into the city, where she became politically active in a campaign to stop the closure of the railway. She was elected to the Nelson Hospital Board in 1956, and to the Nelson City Council in 1961. In 1963, she was appointed as a justice of the peace. She later returned to Nelson to seek the Labour candidacy for the Nelson seat in a 1976 by-election, but was unsuccessful, finishing the second preference to grocer and Nelson City Councillor Mel Courtney.

== Involvement in unions ==
Davies helped to found the Working Women's Council, and in 1974 she became the first female executive of the Federation of Labour.

== Involvement in early childhood education ==
On 14 October 1963 Davies, as president of the Nelson Day Nurseries Committee, organised a meeting of centre staff and managers which resulted in the formation of the New Zealand Association of Childcare Centres. The overall aim was to provide support and staff training to centres in order to increase the quality of care and education for preschool children. Davies also believed that the national Association would be influential in lobbying the government would also help centres to lobby the government over impending childcare regulations.

== Member of Parliament ==
New Zealand Parliament
Years	Term	Electorate	Party
1987–1990	42nd	Pencarrow	Labour
1990–1993	43rd	Pencarrow	Labour

Davies became the Labour MP for Pencarrow in 1987 and served two terms. In November 1990 she was appointed as Labour's spokesperson for Women's Affairs by Labour leader Mike Moore. She retired in 1993 and Trevor Mallard replaced her.

In 1990, Davies received the New Zealand 1990 Commemoration Medal, and in 1993 she was awarded the New Zealand Suffrage Centennial Medal.

Davies died in Wellington in 2005.

== Media ==
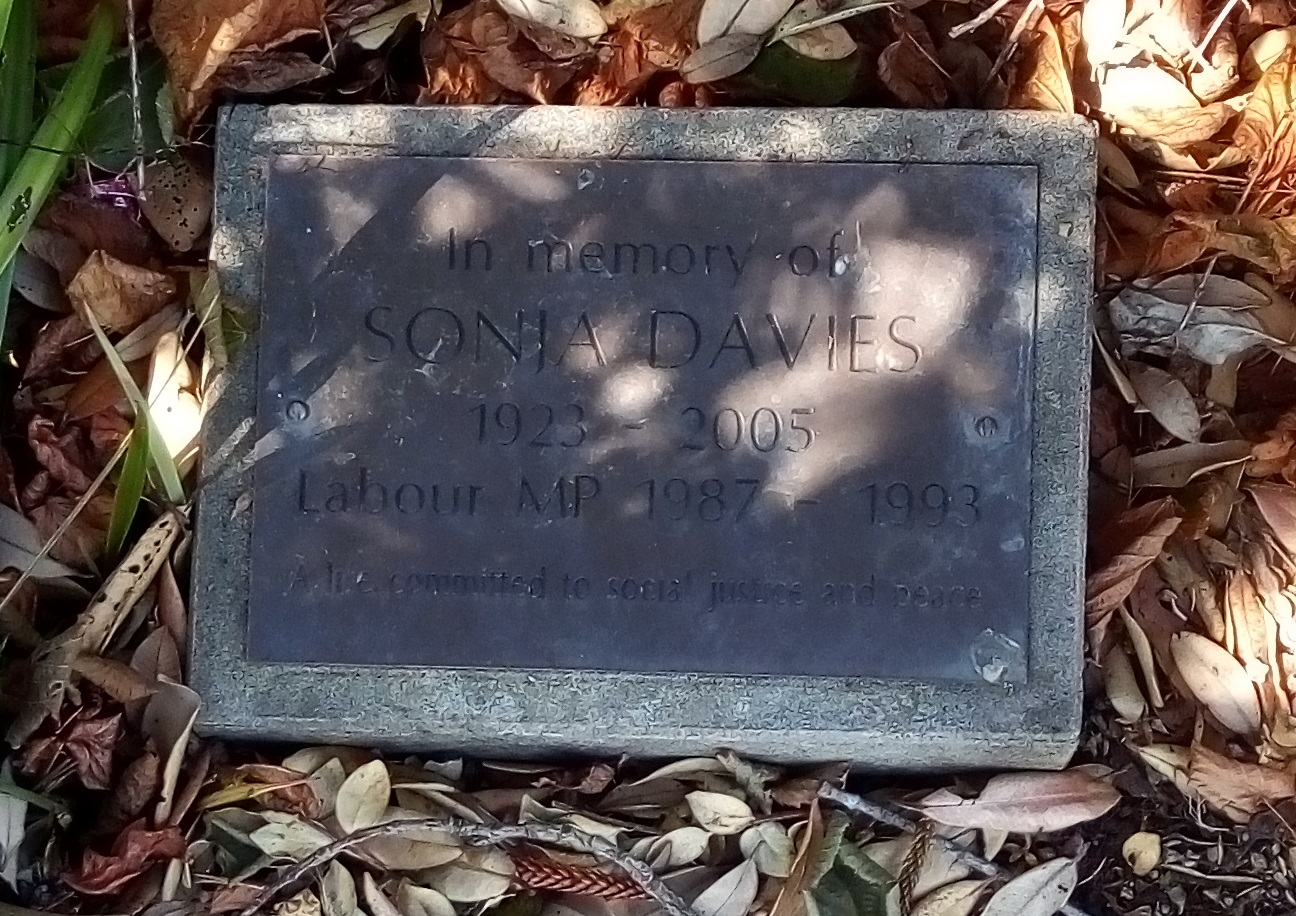
Plaque commemorating Davies

Her autobiography, Bread and Roses: Her Story, (ISBN 1-86953-162-0), was turned into a film in 1994. Directed by Gaylene Preston, the film was also called Bread and Roses. A second volume of autobiography, Marching On (ISBN 1-86941-296-6) was published in 1997.

- Bread and Roses (film, 1994) on IMDb

New Zealand Parliament
Preceded by Fraser Colman	Member of Parliament for Pencarrow; 1987–1993	Succeeded by Trevor Mallard
