= Bill Fox (politician) =

New Zealand politician

The Honourable Bill Fox CMG
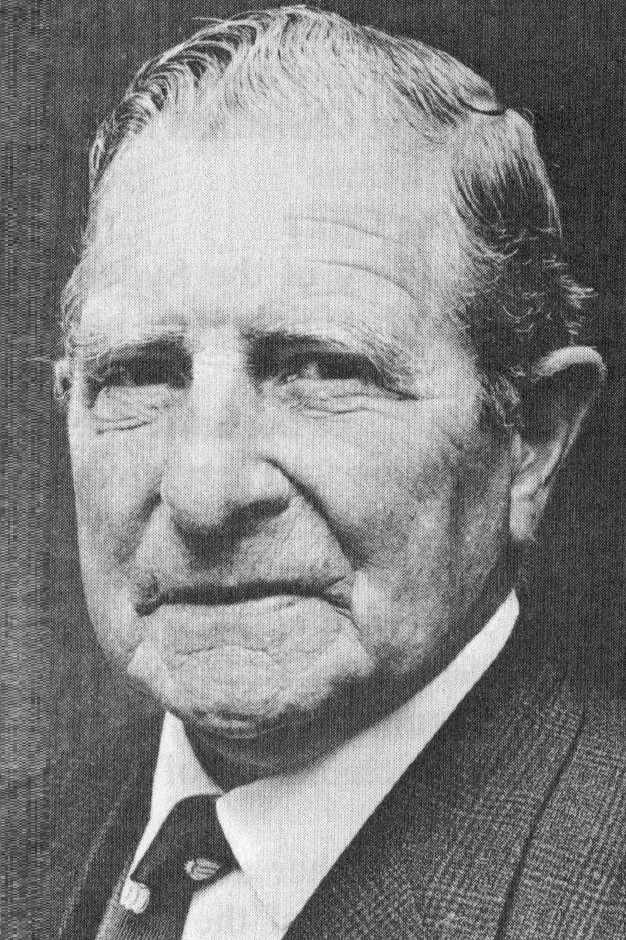
- Fox in 1959

7th Minister of Housing
- In office 12 December 1957 – 12 December 1960
- Prime Minister: Walter Nash
- Preceded by: John Rae
- Succeeded by: John Rae

29th Minister of Marine
- In office 12 December 1957 – 12 December 1960
- Prime Minister: Walter Nash
- Preceded by: Geoff Gerard
- Succeeded by: John McAlpine

Member of the New Zealand Parliament for Miramar
- In office 13 November 1954 – 26 November 1966
- Preceded by: Bob Semple
- Succeeded by: Bill Young

Personal details
- Born: William Arthur Fox; 28 September 1899 London, England
- Died: 9 October 1994 (aged 95) Wanganui, New Zealand
- Party: Labour
- Spouse: Dorothy Mary Sullivan
- Children: 2
- Profession: Trade unionist

William Arthur Fox CMG (28 September 1899 – 9 October 1994) was a New Zealand politician of the Labour Party, and a Cabinet minister in the Second Labour Government of 1957–1960.

== Biography ==
=== Early life and career ===
Fox was born in London on September 28, 1899. During World War I he served in the Royal Navy Mercantile Marine Reserve aboard the SS Tainui. He migrated to New Zealand in 1922. He married Dorothy May Sullivan in 1928 with whom he had two sons.

He was a long-time trade unionist and was a prominent member of the Federated Cooks and Stewards Union, of which he became Auckland secretary from 1930 to 1937. He was also the assistant national secretary from 1937 to 1941 before becoming national general secretary from 1941 to 1955. He then proceeded to serve as vice-president of the Federation of Labour from 1948 to 1955. He was also chairman of the Wellington Trades Council. He frequently stood up to Federation of Labour president Fintan Patrick Walsh, both disliking each other.

In 1945 Fox was appointed by the government as a member of the National Rehabilitation Council. In 1950 he was a representative of the New Zealand government to the International Labour Organization in Geneva.

He was also chairman of the board of governors of Wellington Technical College.

=== Political career ===
New Zealand Parliament
Years	Term	Electorate	Party
1954–1957	31st	Miramar	Labour
1957–1960	32nd	Miramar	Labour
1960–1963	33rd	Miramar	Labour
1963–1966	34th	Miramar	Labour

At the 1953 local-body elections he stood unsuccessfully for the Wellington Harbour Board on a Labour ticket.

Fox represented the Wellington electorate of Miramar from 1954 succeeding the retiring Bob Semple. Fox won the Labour selection in Miramar ahead of more favoured candidates, but received overwhelming union member support, due mainly to Walsh wanting to get him out of the Federation of Labour. Upon first entering Parliament Fox was subject to caucus suspicion as being a "stooge" of Walsh, despite the two having frequently clashed with each other.

During the three-year tenure of the Second Labour Government Fox was a member of cabinet. Fox was the obvious choice in the cabinet to become Minister of Labour, but Prime Minister Walter Nash confounded expectations, appointing Fred Hackett to the portfolio instead. He was instead appointed as both Minister of Housing as well as Minister of Marine. Despite his cabinet ranking, Fox was one of a group of three Labour MPs (the others being Mick Moohan and Frank Kitts) who were deeply critical of the decisions made in the "Black Budget". As Minister of Housing he was in charge of delivering Labour's large state housing scheme. However he was unable to fully deliver on Labour's housing pledges due to a perpetual lack of government owned vacant land. The factors that hamstrung him on housing were largely outside his area of control, but this was seldom acknowledged, and according to Bob Tizard (a backbencher at the time) Fox received "a lot of undeserved abuse" for not expanding state housing enough. He did fulfill Labour's pledge to stop selling off state houses.

He was an agitator against the leadership of Arnold Nordmeyer, whom he deemed to be unelectable. Fox, along with Moohan and Warren Freer, was one of the few senior Labour MPs who backed Norman Kirk's successful leadership challenge to Nordmeyer in 1965. Thereafter he became a close confidant of Kirk who promoted him to the frontbench. Fox was unexpectedly defeated at the 1966 election by National's Bill Young. After his shock defeat in Miramar, Fox was approached to stand for Labour in the 1967 Petone by-election. He declined the invitation however, citing his desire to retire from politics and already having arrangements to move out of the Wellington area.

=== Later life and death ===
Following his exit from Parliament Fox retired and moved to Ōtaki. Following his exit from Parliament Fox was a member of the Waterfront Control Commission, Remuneration Authority and Wellington Rent Appeal Authority. He was also a trustee of the Wellington Trustee Savings Bank.

Fox was a guest of honour at the first meeting of caucus following Labour's victory in the 1972 election and oversaw the election of the cabinet. In the 1975 Queen's Birthday Honours, Fox was appointed a Companion of the Order of St Michael and St George, for public services.

Fox died on 9 October 1994 at Wanganui Hospital, aged 95. He was survived by his wife Dorothy and his sons John and Ted.

== Notes ==
Political offices
Preceded by John Rae	Minister of Housing; 1957–1960	Succeeded by John Rae
Preceded by Geoff Gerard	Minister of Marine; 1957–1960	Succeeded by John McAlpine
New Zealand Parliament
Preceded by Bob Semple	Member of Parliament for Miramar; 1954–1966	Succeeded by Bill Young
