= Pencarrow (electorate) =

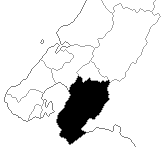
Pencarrow electorate boundaries between 1993 and 1996

Pencarrow is a former Parliamentary electorate in the lower Hutt Valley of New Zealand, from 1978 to 1996.

== Population centres ==
The 1977 electoral redistribution was the most overtly political since the Representation Commission had been established through an amendment to the Representation Act in 1886, initiated by Muldoon's National Government. As part of the 1976 census, a large number of people failed to fill out an electoral re-registration card, and census staff had not been given the authority to insist on the card being completed. This had little practical effect for people on the general roll, but it transferred Māori to the general roll if the card was not handed in. Together with a northward shift of New Zealand's population, this resulted in five new electorates having to be created in the upper part of the North Island. The electoral redistribution was very disruptive, and 22 electorates were abolished, while 27 electorates were newly created (including Pencarrow) or re-established. These changes came into effect for the 1978 election.

The electorate is based on the southern part of the city of Lower Hutt.

== History ==
Pencarrow existed from 1978, replacing the Petone electorate. In the 1978 election, the electorate was won by Fraser Colman, who had been MP for Petone since the 1967 by-election. Colman retired in 1987 and was succeeded by Sonja Davies. After her retirement in 1993, she was succeeded by Trevor Mallard. When the Pencarrow electorate was abolished in 1996, Mallard transferred to the Hutt South electorate.

=== Members of Parliament ===
Key

Labour

| Election | Winner |
|---|---|
| 1978 election | Fraser Colman |
| 1981 election | Fraser Colman |
| 1984 election | Fraser Colman |
| 1987 election | Sonja Davies |
| 1990 election | Sonja Davies |
| 1993 election | Trevor Mallard |
(Electorate abolished in 1996; see Hutt South)

== Election results ==
=== 1993 election ===
1993 general election: Pencarrow
| Party | Candidate | Votes | % | ±% |
|---|---|---|---|---|
| Labour | Trevor Mallard | 8,106 | 44.18 | |
| National | Rosmarie Thomas | 5,546 | 30.23 | |
| Alliance | Len Otway | 3,021 | 16.46 | |
| NZ First | Kia Houpapa | 1,186 | 6.46 | |
| Christian Heritage | Julian Paton | 380 | 2.07 | |
| McGillicuddy Serious | Ben Cauchi | 186 | 1.01 | |
| Majority | | 2,641 | 14.39 | |
| Turnout | | 18,344 | 93.63 | +9.44 |
| Registered electors | | 19,592 | | |

=== 1990 election ===
1990 general election: Pencarrow
| Party | Candidate | Votes | % | ±% |
|---|---|---|---|---|
| Labour | Sonja Davies | 7,486 | 40.97 | +0.20 |
| National | Ray Wallace | 7,102 | 38.87 | |
| Green | K M Goldsmith | 1,499 | 8.20 | |
| NewLabour | Ossie Renata | 1,199 | 6.56 | |
| Independent Labour | Ian Greig | 374 | 2.04 | −17.93 |
| Democrats | Peter Carter | 233 | 1.27 | −3.24 |
| McGillicuddy Serious | J C McGruddy | 131 | 0.71 | |
| NZ Party | M Millette | 125 | 0.68 | |
| Social Credit | J E Cruickshank | 89 | 0.48 | |
| People's Party | Christopher Ellis | 25 | 0.13 | |
| Communist League | Cecil Pirihi | 15 | 0.08 | |
| Majority | | 384 | 2.10 | −7.93 |
| Turnout | | 18,270 | 84.19 | −2.10 |
| Registered electors | | 21,700 | | |

=== 1987 election ===
1987 general election: Pencarrow
| Party | Candidate | Votes | % | ±% |
|---|---|---|---|---|
| Labour | Sonja Davies | 7,524 | 40.77 | |
| National | Andrew Harvey | 5,673 | 30.74 | |
| Independent Labour | Ian Grieg | 3,686 | 19.97 | |
| Democrats | Peter Carter | 834 | 4.51 | |
| Independent Labour | Popata Oswald Renata | 490 | 2.65 | |
| Independent | Stephen Dransfield | 126 | 0.68 | |
| McGillicuddy Serious | John Morrison | 119 | 0.64 | |
| Majority | | 1,851 | 10.03 | |
| Turnout | | 18,452 | 86.29 | −5.61 |
| Registered electors | | 21,383 | | |

=== 1984 election ===
1984 general election: Pencarrow
| Party | Candidate | Votes | % | ±% |
|---|---|---|---|---|
| Labour | Fraser Colman | 10,338 | 54.65 | +0.87 |
| National | Barry Cranston | 4,920 | 26.01 | |
| NZ Party | Clive Wickens | 2,992 | 15.81 | |
| Social Credit | P Lyth | 664 | 3.51 | |
| Majority | | 5,418 | 28.64 | +6.21 |
| Turnout | | 18,914 | 91.90 | +2.36 |
| Registered electors | | 20,580 | | |

=== 1981 election ===
1981 general election: Pencarrow
| Party | Candidate | Votes | % | ±% |
|---|---|---|---|---|
| Labour | Fraser Colman | 9,745 | 53.78 | +0.39 |
| National | Willard Amaru | 5,680 | 31.35 | |
| Social Credit | Reg Moore | 2,692 | 14.85 | |
| Majority | | 4,065 | 22.43 | +2.49 |
| Turnout | | 18,117 | 89.54 | +18.56 |
| Registered electors | | 20,233 | | |

=== 1978 election ===
1978 general election: Pencarrow
| Party | Candidate | Votes | % | ±% |
|---|---|---|---|---|
| Labour | Fraser Colman | 9,769 | 53.39 | |
| National | Brett Newell | 6,030 | 32.95 | |
| Social Credit | B E Reeves | 1,901 | 10.39 | |
| Values | A B Gardiner | 596 | 3.25 | |
| Majority | | 3,649 | 19.94 | |
| Turnout | | 18,296 | 70.98 | |
| Registered electors | | 25,773 | | |
