= Bill Lambert (politician) =

New Zealand politician (1930–2019)

Brian Spencer George Lambert (22 November 1930 – 22 December 2019), commonly known as Bill Lambert, was a New Zealand politician of the National Party.

== Biography ==
New Zealand Parliament
Years	Term	Electorate	Party
1975–1978	38th	Western Hutt	National

Lambert was born in 1930, the son of Basil Lambert. He received his education at Silverstream College. He worked as a journalist for The Dominion and was afterwards public relations officer for Mobil Oil (1956–1960). He worked as public relations manager for Feltex Carpets (1961–1966), and was then a ministerial press officer (1966–1969). He then went into private business and was manager for Forum PR Ltd (1969–1972), and manager for Extra Media Services (1972–1975) in Wellington.

On 16 November 1957, he married June, the daughter of Hector Hailwood. They had four sons.

At the 1971 local elections he stood as a candidate for the Lower Hutt City Council on mayor John Kennedy-Good's Combined Team ticket, but was unsuccessful. He represented the Hutt Valley electorate of Western Hutt from 1975 to 1978, when he was defeated by Labour's John Terris.

Lambert died in Porirua on 22 December 2019.

== Notes ==
New Zealand Parliament
Preceded by Henry May	Member of Parliament for Western Hutt; 1975–1978	Succeeded by John Terris
