= Graeme Reeves =

New Zealand politician

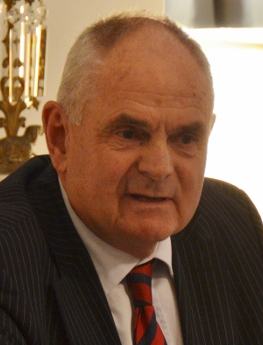
Reeves in 2014

Graeme Reeves (born 1947), a former member of the New Zealand National Party, represented Miramar in Parliament from 1990 to 1993, when he was defeated by Annette King of the Labour Party.

== Member of Parliament ==
New Zealand Parliament
Years	Term	Electorate	Party
1990–1993	43rd	Miramar	National

Reeves, who was formerly a solicitor, and five other one-term National MPs entered Parliament in a swing against Labour in the 1990 election. He failed to re-enter Parliament as a list candidate in the Tukituki electorate in the 1996 election. In 2004 Reeves was elected president of United Future succeeding former Wellington Mayor Mark Blumsky. Since then, he has stood several times for United Future. In the 2008 election he filled the number 4 slot in the United Future list and stood as a United Future electorate candidate for Wairarapa.

== Post-parliamentary career ==
Reeves was appointed to the New Zealand Gambling Commission in June 2004. In December 2010 he was appointed as Chief Gambling Commissioner. He was reappointed as chair for a further three years in July 2012.

== Notes ==
New Zealand Parliament
Preceded by Peter Neilson	Member of Parliament for Miramar; 1990–1993	Succeeded by Annette King
