= Peter Neilson (politician born 1954) =

New Zealand politician (1954–2022)

The Honourable Peter Neilson
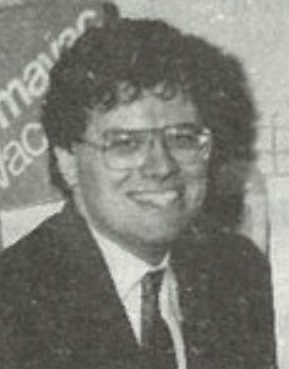
- Neilson in 1986

34th Minister of Works and Development
- In office 9 February 1990 – 2 November 1990
- Prime Minister: Geoffrey Palmer; Mike Moore
- Preceded by: Bill Jeffries
- Succeeded by: Doug Kidd

20th Minister of Revenue
- In office 9 February 1990 – 2 November 1990
- Prime Minister: Geoffrey Palmer; Mike Moore
- Preceded by: David Caygill
- Succeeded by: Wyatt Creech

51st Minister of Customs
- In office 8 August 1989 – 2 November 1990
- Prime Minister: Geoffrey Palmer; Mike Moore
- Preceded by: Margaret Shields
- Succeeded by: Wyatt Creech

Member of the New Zealand Parliament for Miramar
- In office 28 November 1981 – 27 October 1990
- Preceded by: Bill Young
- Succeeded by: Graeme Reeves

Personal details
- Born: 12 July 1954 Birmingham, England
- Died: 9 February 2022 (aged 67)
- Party: Labour
- Spouse: Megan Clark
- Children: 2

Peter Neilson (12 July 1954 – 9 February 2022) was a New Zealand businessman and politician who was a Labour Party Member of Parliament in the New Zealand House of Representatives.

== Biography ==
=== Early life and career ===
Neilson's father was born in Auckland, but raised in England. Neilson was born on 12 July 1954 in Birmingham, England, and moved to New Zealand in 1958 with his family. He was educated at Glendowie College and University of Auckland, where he graduated with a bachelor of commerce in 1977. He had one son and one daughter with his wife Megan Clark.

He became an economist and later a senior research officer at the Department of Labour.

=== Political career ===
Neilson joined the Labour Party in 1972 and stood for the Auckland Regional Authority in the 1974 local elections on a Labour ticket alongside future parliamentary colleagues Helen Clark and Richard Northey. He stood in the Auckland city ward but was unsuccessful. He was later Labour's campaign chairman at the 1977 local elections, chair of the Tamaki electorate committee, Secretary of Labour's Youth Council and Treasurer of the Wellington Labour Local Body Committee.

==== Member of parliament ====
New Zealand Parliament
Years	Term	Electorate	Party
1981–1984	40th	Miramar	Labour
1984–1987	41st	Miramar	Labour
1987–1990	42nd	Miramar	Labour

He represented the Wellington electorate of Miramar in Parliament from 1981 to 1990, when he was defeated by Graeme Reeves. In 1983 he was appointed Labour's spokesperson for Employment and Productivity by Labour leader David Lange. He became chairman of a convenor and secretary of a caucus economic committee and tasked with finding methods to leave the then current wage and price freeze in New Zealand.

To commemorate the 50th anniversary of the construction of New Zealand's first state house located in the Miramar electorate, Neilson and Minister of Housing, Helen Clark, carried a coffee table through the same door that former Prime Minister Michael Joseph Savage had done 50 years before. The stunt was referred to as an act of "overt symbolism".

==== Cabinet minister ====
In 1984 Neilson was appointed a Parliamentary Under-Secretary to Minister of Trade and Industry during Fourth Labour Government of New Zealand. In Labour's second term Neilson was a member of the New Zealand Cabinet from 1987 to 1990. He was Minister of Revenue, Customs, Works and Development and Associate Minister for State‑Owned Enterprises and Finance. As a minister he privatised the Government Printing Office and State Insurance Company.

In 1990, Neilson was awarded the New Zealand 1990 Commemoration Medal.

=== Later life and death ===
After exiting parliament Neilson began a career as a business consultant. He undertook several overseas commissions for Ernst & Young before leaving to become chief executive officer of the Sustainable Business Network.

From 2011 until 2016 he was chief executive of the New Zealand Financial Services Council. He was Chairperson of the Simplicity Charitable Trust, which manages a KiwiSaver scheme in New Zealand. He was also a board member for the National Foundation for Deaf & Hard of Hearing.

Neilson made a return to politics and was a Labour Party candidate in the Manurewa-Papakura ward for the Auckland Council at the 2019 Auckland local elections. He was unsuccessful.

He died on 9 February 2022, at the age of 67.

== Notes ==
Political offices
Preceded by Bill Jeffries	Minister of Works and Development; 1990	Succeeded by Doug Kidd
Preceded by David Caygill	Minister of Revenue; 1990	Succeeded by Wyatt Creech
Preceded by Margaret Shields	Minister of Customs; 1989–1990	Succeeded by Wyatt Creech
New Zealand Parliament
Preceded by Bill Young	Member of Parliament for Miramar; 1981–1990	Succeeded by Graeme Reeves
