= Sydney Jones =

Sydney Jones may refer to:

- Sydney Jones (businessman) (1872–1947), English businessman and politician
- Sydney Jones (politician) (1892–1982), New Zealand politician
- Sydney Jones (soccer) (born 2002), American professional soccer player

== See also ==
- Sidney Charles Jones (1902–1944), British agent
