= Western Hutt =

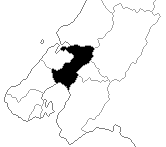
Western Hutt electorate boundaries between 1993 and 1996.

Western Hutt was a New Zealand parliamentary electorate from 1969 to 1996.

== Population centres ==
Through an amendment in the Electoral Act in 1965, the number of electorates in the South Island was fixed at 25, an increase of one since the 1962 electoral redistribution. It was accepted that through the more rapid population growth in the North Island, the number of its electorates would continue to increase, and to keep proportionality, three new electorates were allowed for in the 1967 electoral redistribution for the next election. In the North Island, five electorates were newly created (including Western Hutt) and one electorate was reconstituted while three electorates were abolished. In the South Island, three electorates were newly created and one electorate was reconstituted while three electorates were abolished. The overall effect of the required changes was highly disruptive to existing electorates, with all but three electorates having their boundaries altered. These changes came into effect with the 1969 election.

The main population centre in the electorate was the city of Lower Hutt in the Hutt Valley.

== History ==
The electorate partly replaced the Hutt seat, which had been held by Trevor Young (who went to the Eastern Hutt seat), and Western Hutt was won in 1978 by John Terris for the Labour Party.

In the 1990 election the seat was won by Joy McLauchlan of the National Party; one of several seats won by National at the 1990 general election. McLauchlan was re-elected in 1993.

In 1996 the seat was replaced by the Hutt South seat, which was won by Trevor Mallard of the Labour Party.

=== Members of Parliament ===
Key

Labour National

Election	Winner
1969 election	Henry May
1972 election	Henry May
1975 election	Bill Lambert
1978 election	John Terris
1981 election	John Terris
1984 election	John Terris
1987 election	John Terris
1990 election	Joy McLauchlan
1993 election	Joy McLauchlan
(Electorate abolished in 1996; see Hutt South and Ohariu-Belmont)

== Election results ==
=== 1993 election ===
1993 general election: Western Hutt
Party	Candidate	Votes	%	±%
National	Joy McLauchlan	9,043	43.87	−1.66
Labour	Vern Walsh	7,501	36.39	
Alliance	David Steele	2,688	13.04	
NZ First	Maraea Ropata	742	3.60	
Christian Heritage	Don France	443	2.14	
McGillicuddy Serious	Alastair McGlinchy	192	0.93	
Majority		1,542	7.48	+0.48
Turnout		20,609	86.43	+0.45
Registered electors		23,843		

=== 1990 election ===
1990 general election: Western Hutt
Party	Candidate	Votes	%	±%
National	Joy McLauchlan	9,167	45.53	+7.01
Labour	John Terris	8,467	42.05	−14.63
Green	Kari Haydon	1,372	6.81	
NewLabour	J Olsen	668	3.31	
Democrats	Errol Baird	162	0.80	−3.20
McGillicuddy Serious	J A L Speak	132	0.65	
Social Credit	M N Brooke	94	0.46	
Independent	B Pillow	54	0.26	
People's Party	L Hannah	15	0.07	
Majority		700	3.47	
Turnout		20,131	85.98	−2.71
Registered electors		23,411		

=== 1987 election ===
1987 general election: Western Hutt
Party	Candidate	Votes	%	±%
Labour	John Terris	11,074	56.68	+5.76
National	Joy McLauchlan	7,526	38.52	
Democrats	Errol Baird	783	4.00	
McGillicuddy Serious	Steven Heath	153	0.78	
Majority		3,548	18.16	−2.81
Turnout		19,536	88.69	−5.30
Registered electors		22,026		

=== 1984 election ===
1984 general election: Western Hutt
Party	Candidate	Votes	%	±%
Labour	John Terris	10,555	50.92	+2.48
National	John Tanner	6,207	29.94	−11.22
NZ Party	Philip Hale	3,557	17.16	
Social Credit	David Coad	407	1.96	
Majority		4,348	20.97	+13.69
Turnout		20,726	93.99	+3.77
Registered electors		22,050		

=== 1981 election ===
1981 general election: Western Hutt
Party	Candidate	Votes	%	±%
Labour	John Terris	9,441	48.44	+3.77
National	John Tanner	8,021	41.16	
Social Credit	Ivan Woolloff	1,926	9.88	
Independent	Donald McPherson	69	0.35	
National Front	Bas Zandbergen	30	0.15	
Majority		1,420	7.28	+6.39
Turnout		19,487	90.22	+24.68
Registered electors		21,599		

=== 1978 election ===
1978 general election: Western Hutt
Party	Candidate	Votes	%	±%
Labour	John Terris	8,368	44.67	
National	Bill Lambert	8,200	43.77	−0.16
Social Credit	Kenneth Albert Demicol	1,645	8.78	
Values	Neville McPherson	348	1.85	
Marijuana Party	Vassos Gavriel	139	0.74	
Tory	Philip James Tree	32	0.17	
Majority		168	0.89	
Turnout		18,732	65.54	−1.80
Registered electors		28,581		

=== 1975 election ===
1975 general election: Western Hutt
Party	Candidate	Votes	%	±%
National	Bill Lambert	8,334	43.93	
Labour	Henry May	8,225	43.36	−9.62
Values	Merv Robertson	1,216	6.41	
Social Credit	John Charles Tibbles	1,194	6.29	
Majority		168	0.88	
Turnout		18,969	83.54	−6.65
Registered electors		22,706		

=== 1972 election ===
1972 general election: Western Hutt
Party	Candidate	Votes	%	±%
Labour	Henry May	8,476	52.98	+1.30
National	Julian Watts	6,084	38.02	
Social Credit	Ken Lattimer	687	4.29	
Values	A A King	664	4.15	
New Democratic	J P Fitzgibbon	87	0.54	
Majority		2,392	14.95	+6.39
Turnout		15,998	90.19	+2.91
Registered electors		17,738		

=== 1969 election ===
1969 general election: Western Hutt
Party	Candidate	Votes	%	±%
Labour	Henry May	8,578	51.68	
National	Egan Ogier	7,157	43.12	
Social Credit	Michael Kalaugher	861	5.18	
Majority		1,421	8.56	
Turnout		16,596	87.28	
Registered electors		19,014		
