= Harry Combs (politician) =

New Zealand politician (1881–1954)

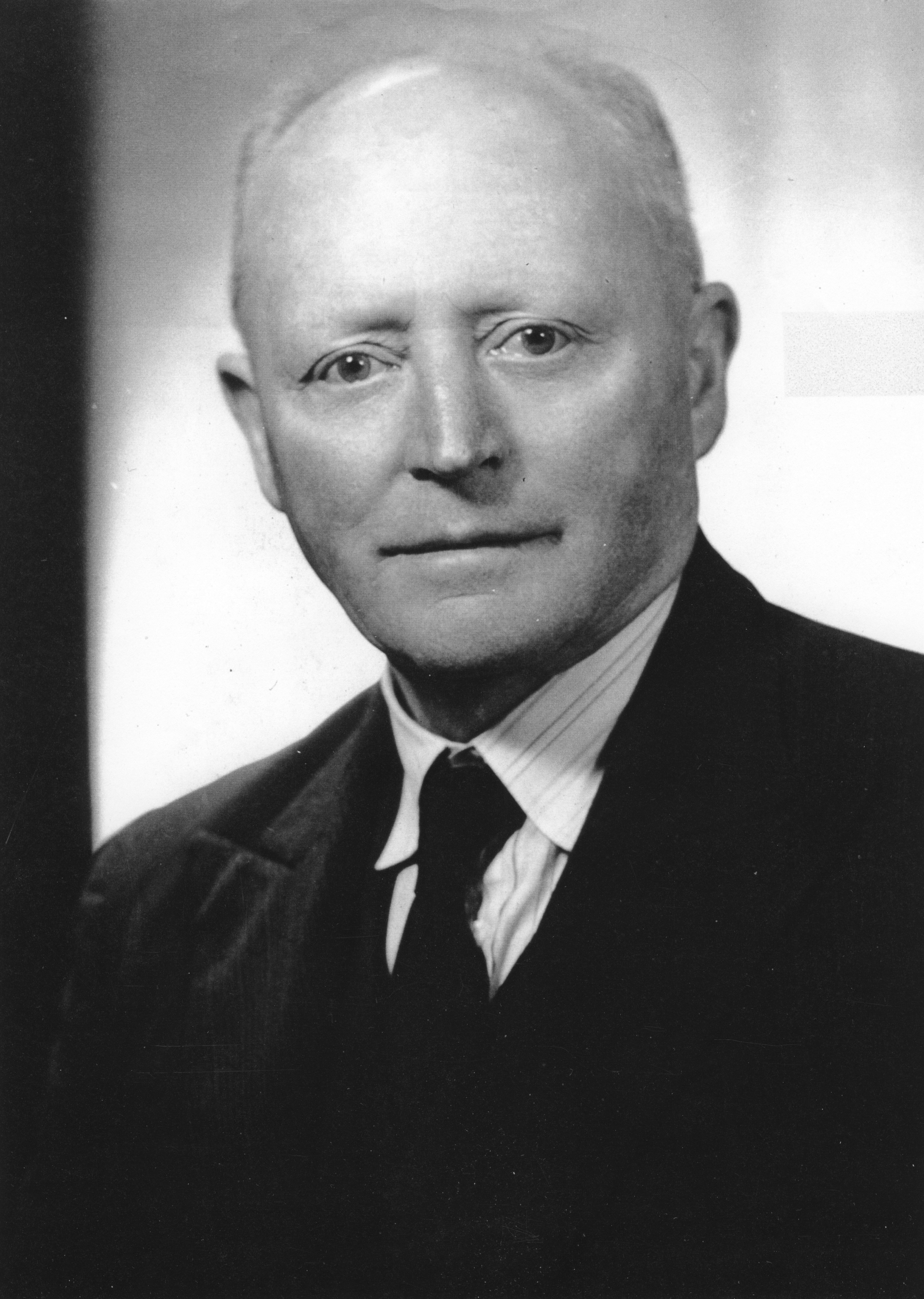

Member of the New Zealand Parliament for Wellington Suburbs
- In office 15 October 1938 – 27 November 1946
- Preceded by: Robert Wright
- Succeeded by: constituency abolished

Member of the New Zealand Parliament for Onslow
- In office 27 November 1946 – 12 June 1954
- Preceded by: new constituency
- Succeeded by: Henry May

Personal details
- Born: 14 January 1881 Napier, New Zealand
- Died: 12 June 1954 (aged 73) Wellington, New Zealand
- Party: Labour
- Spouse: Ethel Bessie Webster

Harry Ernest Combs (14 January 1881 – 12 June 1954) was a New Zealand politician of the Labour Party.

== Biography ==
=== Early life and career ===
Combs was born in Napier in 1881. He received a state school education in Gisborne. He began work as a runner for The Poverty Bay Herald. He then became a messenger at the post office and became involved with the Post and Telegraph Employees' Association. In 1908 he married Ethel Bessie Webster.

He was the Post and Telegraph Employees' Association's president between 1909 and 1911 and then general secretary from 1916 to 1926. Additionally he was the editor of the association's journal Katipo for twenty years between 1906 and 1926. He played a leading part in the demands for a reclassification of the service in 1918 and in 1920 he led a deputation to Prime Minister William Massey on the question of cost-of-living pay increases.

He was also Secretary of the New Zealand Rugby Union from 1919 to 1926 before establishing his own printing business (in partnership). He was head of the Civic Press Company Limited printing firm.

=== Political career ===
New Zealand Parliament
Years	Term	Electorate	Party
1938–1943	26th	Wellington Suburbs	Labour
1943–1946	27th	Wellington Suburbs	Labour
1946–1949	28th	Onslow	Labour
1949–1951	29th	Onslow	Labour
1951–1954	30th	Onslow	Labour

Combs unsuccessfully contested the 1922 and 1925 elections in the seat of Wellington North. He then became Labour's campaign organiser in Hawkes Bay in 1928 and Taranaki in 1931. At the 1944 local elections he was nominated to be Labour's candidate for the mayoralty, one of five candidates he declined to stand for selection with Labour Party president James Roberts prevailing.

He represented the Wellington electorates of Wellington Suburbs from 1938 to 1946, and then Onslow from 1946 to 1954 when he died.

Combs was Parliamentary Under-Secretary to the Minister of Finance from 1947 to 1949.

In 1953, Combs was awarded the Queen Elizabeth II Coronation Medal. In February 1954 he announced he would retire at the general election later that year owing to ill health.

=== Death ===
Combs died on 12 June 1954 in Wellington. His death necessitated a by-election, but as a general election was due in November 1954 the nominated Labour candidate Henry May was not opposed, so was declared returned unopposed.

== Notes ==
New Zealand Parliament
Preceded by Robert Wright	Member of Parliament for Wellington Suburbs; 1938–1946	Constituency abolished
New constituency	Member of Parliament for Onslow; 1946–1954	Succeeded by Henry May
