= Petone (electorate) =

Petone is a former parliamentary electorate in the lower Hutt Valley of New Zealand, from 1946 to 1978. The electorate was represented by two Members of Parliament from the Labour Party.

== Population centres ==
The 1941 New Zealand census had been postponed due to World War II, so the 1946 electoral redistribution had to take ten years of population growth and movements into account. The North Island gained a further two electorates from the South Island due to faster population growth. The abolition of the country quota through the Electoral Amendment Act, 1945 reduced the number and increased the size of rural electorates. None of the existing electorates remained unchanged, 27 electorates were abolished, eight former electorates were re-established, and 19 electorates were created for the first time, including Petone. The electorate was based on the southern part of the city of Lower Hutt. Settlements within the electorate included the suburb of Petone, Wainuiomata, and Eastbourne.

The Petone electorate was abolished through the 1977 electoral redistribution. Most of its area went to the Pencarrow electorate, while some area, including the suburb of Petone, transferred to the Western Hutt electorate.

== History ==
The Petone electorate was first used for the 1946 election. Its first representative was Mick Moohan of the Labour Party, who was Minister of Railways from 1957 to 1960 while serving the electorate. Moohan died in office on 7 February 1967.

This caused the 1967 by-election, which was won by Fraser Colman. He served until the electorate was abolished in 1978, and moved to the Pencarrow electorate.

=== Members of Parliament ===
The Petone electorate was represented by two Members of Parliament.

Key

Labour

Election	Winner
1946 election	Mick Moohan
1949 election	Mick Moohan
1951 election	Mick Moohan
1954 election	Mick Moohan
1957 election	Mick Moohan
1960 election	Mick Moohan
1963 election	Mick Moohan
1966 election	Mick Moohan
1967 by-election	Fraser Colman
1969 election	Fraser Colman
1972 election	Fraser Colman
1975 election	Fraser Colman
(Electorate abolished in 1978; see Pencarrow and Western Hutt)

== Election results ==
=== 1975 election ===
1975 general election: Petone
Party	Candidate	Votes	%	±%
Labour	Fraser Colman	8,333	51.28	−11.83
National	Brel Gluyas	5,499	33.84	
Values	Ian Donaldson	1,168	7.18	
Social Credit	Reg Moore	1,155	7.10	+2.39
Liberal	John Anthony Patrick Broderick	62	0.38	
Socialist Action	Russell Johnson	31	0.19	
Majority		2,834	17.44	−18.86
Turnout		16,248	80.96	−7.30
Registered electors		20,069		

=== 1972 election ===
1972 general election: Petone
Party	Candidate	Votes	%	±%
Labour	Fraser Colman	9,334	63.11	+4.23
National	Nick Ursin	3,994	27.00	
Social Credit	Reg Moore	698	4.71	
Values	L B Frost	674	4.55	
New Democratic	E G M Tyley	90	0.60	
Majority		5,340	36.10	−12.24
Turnout		14,790	88.26	−0.36
Registered electors		16,756		

=== 1969 election ===
1969 general election: Petone
Party	Candidate	Votes	%	±%
Labour	Fraser Colman	8,512	58.88	+4.28
National	Francis Joshua Handy	5,064	35.03	
Social Credit	K H Walker	880	6.08	
Majority		3,450	23.86	+0.11
Turnout		14,456	88.62	+21.05
Registered electors		16,312		

=== 1967 by-election ===
1967 Petone by-election
Party	Candidate	Votes	%	±%
Labour	Fraser Colman	7,086	54.60	
National	Dick Martin	4,003	30.84	
Social Credit	Colin Whitmill	1,888	14.54	+2.43
Majority		3,083	23.75	
Turnout		12,977	67.57	−20.17
Registered electors		19,203		
Labour hold		Swing		

=== 1966 election ===
1966 general election: Petone
Party	Candidate	Votes	%	±%
Labour	Mick Moohan	8,301	52.12	−2.78
National	Joe Miller	5,694	35.75	
Social Credit	Colin Whitmill	1,929	12.11	
Majority		2,607	16.37	+1.23
Turnout		15,924	84.74	−3.42
Registered electors		18,791		

=== 1963 election ===
1963 general election: Petone
Party	Candidate	Votes	%	±%
Labour	Mick Moohan	8,875	54.90	−1.07
National	Peter Love	6,427	39.75	
Social Credit	Thomas Frank Foulger	688	4.25	
Independent	George Stancliff	175	1.08	
Majority		2,448	15.14	−3.55
Turnout		16,165	88.16	−1.60
Registered electors		18,335		

=== 1960 election ===
1960 general election: Petone
Party	Candidate	Votes	%	±%
Labour	Mick Moohan	8,738	55.97	−5.15
National	Dick Martin	5,820	37.28	
Social Credit	Desmond George Long	1,052	6.73	−1.94
Majority		2,918	18.69	−8.35
Turnout		15,610	89.76	−3.05
Registered electors		17,389		

=== 1957 election ===
1957 general election: Petone
Party	Candidate	Votes	%	±%
Labour	Mick Moohan	9,401	61.12	−0.07
National	Dan Riddiford	5,242	34.08	
Social Credit	Desmond George Long	737	4.79	
Majority		4,159	27.04	−2.14
Turnout		15,380	92.81	+6.42
Registered electors		16,571		

=== 1954 election ===
1954 general election: Petone
Party	Candidate	Votes	%	±%
Labour	Mick Moohan	8,831	61.19	+2.90
National	Fanny Soward	4,620	32.01	
Social Credit	Robert Leslie Allan	859	5.95	
Communist	Connie Birchfield	120	0.83	
Majority		4,211	29.18	+12.59
Turnout		14,430	86.39	−1.81
Registered electors		16,702		

=== 1951 election ===
1951 general election: Petone
Party	Candidate	Votes	%	±%
Labour	Mick Moohan	7,502	58.29	−0.55
National	Norm Croft	5,367	41.70	+2.12
Majority		2,135	16.59	−2.66
Turnout		12,869	88.20	−4.23
Registered electors		14,590		

=== 1949 election ===
1949 general election: Petone
Party	Candidate	Votes	%	±%
Labour	Mick Moohan	7,721	58.84	−6.53
National	Norm Croft	5,194	39.58	
Communist	Arthur Philip Quinn	207	1.57	
Majority		2,527	19.25	−11.49
Turnout		13,122	92.43	+0.29
Registered electors		14,196		

=== 1946 election ===
1946 general election: Petone
Party	Candidate	Votes	%	±%
Labour	Mick Moohan	8,545	65.37	
National	George London	4,526	34.62	
Majority		4,019	30.74	
Turnout		13,071	92.14	
Registered electors		14,185		
