= Onslow (electorate) =

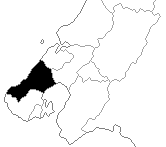
Onslow electorate boundaries between 1993 and 1996

Onslow was a New Zealand parliamentary electorate, from 1946 to 1963, and then again from 1993 to 1996 in the Wellington area. It was represented by three Members of Parliament throughout the years it existed.

== Population centres ==
The 1941 New Zealand census had been postponed due to World War II, so the 1946 electoral redistribution had to take ten years of population growth and movements into account. The North Island gained a further two electorates from the South Island due to faster population growth. The abolition of the country quota through the Electoral Amendment Act, 1945 reduced the number and increased the size of rural electorates. None of the existing electorates remained unchanged, 27 electorates were abolished, eight former electorates were re-established, and 19 electorates were created for the first time, including Onslow.

The electorate covered the northern suburbs of the city of Wellington, i.e. Ngaio, Khandallah and Johnsonville. The name Onslow comes from the former Borough of Onslow which covered Wadestown until April 1907 its south ward and its most populous area and the remaining Khandallah Ngaio areas until they too joined Wellington City in 1919.

== History ==
The electorate was established for the 1946 election.

The unsuccessful National candidate in 1954 was Wilfred Fortune, who had represented Eden in Auckland from 1946 to 1954.

The electorate lasted until the 1963 election, when the Karori electorate was established.

The electorate was re-established in the 1993 election to replace Ohariu. Peter Dunne, who had previously represented the Ohariu electorate, was the successful candidate. For the first MMP election, the 1996 election, it was renamed back to Ohariu-Belmont, and included Belmont in the Hutt Valley.

=== Members of Parliament ===
The Onslow electorate was represented by three Members of Parliament.

Key

Labour Independent Future United NZ

Elections	Winner
1946 election	Harry Combs
1949 election	Harry Combs
1951 election	Harry Combs
1954 by-election	Henry May
1954 election	Henry May
1957 election	Henry May
1960 election	Henry May
(Electorate abolished 1963–1993)
1993 election	Peter Dunne
(Electorate abolished in 1996; see Ohariu-Belmont)

== Election results ==
=== 1993 election ===
1993 general election: Onslow
Party	Candidate	Votes	%	±%
Labour	Peter Dunne	9,096	41.61	
National	George Mathew	8,031	36.74	
Alliance	Phillida Bunkle	3,077	14.07	
NZ First	Elisabeth Burgess	682	3.12	
Christian Heritage	Colin Byford	457	2.09	
Independent	Sarah Lysaght	296	1.35	
McGillicuddy Serious	Thomas Barker	130	0.59	
Natural Law	Mary-Anne McGregor	62	0.28	
Independent	Keith Leslie Stewart	24	0.10	
Majority		1,065	4.87	
Turnout		21,855	86.98	
Registered electors		25,126		

=== 1960 election ===
1960 general election: Onslow
Party	Candidate	Votes	%	±%
Labour	Henry May	8,670	45.25	−10.72
National	Maida Clark	7,880	41.12	
Social Credit	Eric Elliott	920	4.80	
Communist	Sydney Smith	101	0.52	
Majority		790	4.12	−12.73
Turnout		17,571	91.70	−2.99
Registered electors		19,160		

=== 1957 election ===
1957 general election: Onslow
Party	Candidate	Votes	%	±%
Labour	Henry May	8,882	55.97	+7.20
National	Kevin O'Brien	6,207	39.11	
Social Credit	Frederick Buckley	779	4.90	
Majority		2,675	16.85	+13.65
Turnout		15,868	94.69	+5.08
Registered electors		16,757		

=== 1954 election ===
1954 general election: Onslow
Party	Candidate	Votes	%	±%
Labour	Henry May	7,898	48.77	
National	Wilfred Fortune	7,379	45.56	
Social Credit	Barney Thomas Daniel	916	5.65	
Majority		519	3.20	
Turnout		16,193	89.61	
Registered electors		18,070		

=== 1954 by-election ===
1954 Onslow by-election: Onslow
Party	Candidate	Votes	%	±%
Labour	Henry May	unopposed		

=== 1951 election ===
1951 general election: Onslow
Party	Candidate	Votes	%	±%
Labour	Harry Combs	9,539	53.08	−6.76
National	Jack Meadowcroft	8,433	46.92	+0.64
Majority		1,106	6.15	−6.12
Turnout		17,972	90.62	−4.44
Registered electors		19,831		

=== 1949 election ===
1949 general election: Onslow
Party	Candidate	Votes	%	±%
Labour	Harry Combs	9,391	59.84	+4.27
National	Jack Meadowcroft	7,464	47.56	
Majority		1,927	12.27	+1.15
Turnout		15,693	86.18	−6.64
Registered electors		18,209		

=== 1946 election ===
1946 general election: Onslow
Party	Candidate	Votes	%	±%
Labour	Harry Combs	7,880	55.57	
National	Philip Patrick Lynch	6,302	44.43	
Majority		1,578	11.12	
Turnout		14,182	92.82	
Registered electors		15,278		
