= Miramar (electorate) =

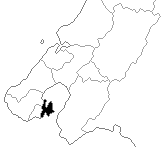
Miramar electorate boundaries between 1993 and 1996.

Miramar was a New Zealand parliamentary electorate in the south-eastern suburbs of Wellington. It was created in 1946, replacing Wellington East, and was replaced by Rongotai for the first MMP election of 1996.

== Population centres ==
The 1941 New Zealand census had been postponed due to World War II, so the 1946 electoral redistribution had to take ten years of population growth and movements into account. The North Island gained a further two electorates from the South Island due to faster population growth. The abolition of the country quota through the Electoral Amendment Act, 1945 reduced the number and increased the size of rural electorates. None of the existing electorates remained unchanged, 27 electorates were abolished, eight former electorates were re-established, and 19 electorates were created for the first time, including Miramar. The boundary of the Miramar electorate in 1946 took in the Miramar Peninsula, Rongotai and most of Lyall Bay and Kilbirnie, as follows:

All that area bounded by a line commencing at a point on the boundary of the City of Wellington at a point on the shore of Evans Bay in line with the middle-line of Onepu Road; thence to and along the production of that middle-line to the middle of Seatoun Road [now Rongotai Road]; thence along the middle of Seatoun Road and Crawford Road to a point in line with the eastern boundary of the Town Belt Reserve; thence in a southerly direction to and along the eastern boundary of the said Town Belt Reserve to a point in line with the middle of Carlton Street; thence to and along the middle of Carlton Street and Sutherland Road to a point in line with the middle-line of Lot 38, Block IV, as shown on the plan numbered 1889, deposited in the office of the District Land Registrar at Wellington; thence to and along the middle-line of that lot to and along the middle of Queen's Drive and its production to the shore of Lyall Bay; thence along the shores of Cook Strait, Port Nicholson, and Evans Bay, including all wharves and extensions seaward, to a point in line with the middle-line of Onepu Road, the point of commencement.

This boundary slowly shifted towards the city of Wellington in subsequent electoral redistributions. The electorate boundaries were unaffected by the electoral redistributions in 1972 and 1987. The electorate was abolished in 1996, when it was replaced by the Rongotai electorate.

== History ==
The electorate was marginal, and changed several times between the parties. The first representative in 1946 was Bob Semple of the Labour Party. Semple did not stand for re-election in 1954 and died at New Plymouth in January 1955.

Semple was succeeded by Labour's Bill Fox, who served from 1954 until his defeat in the 1966 election by National's Bill Young.

=== Members of Parliament ===
Key

Labour National

Election	Winner
1946 election	Bob Semple
1949 election	Bob Semple
1951 election	Bob Semple
1954 election	Bill Fox
1957 election	Bill Fox
1960 election	Bill Fox
1963 election	Bill Fox
1966 election	Bill Young
1969 election	Bill Young
1972 election	Bill Young
1975 election	Bill Young
1978 election	Bill Young
1981 election	Peter Neilsen
1984 election	Peter Neilsen
1987 election	Peter Neilsen
1990 election	Graeme Reeves
1993 election	Annette King
(Electorate abolished in 1996; see Rongotai)

== Election results ==
=== 1993 election ===
1993 general election: Miramar
Party	Candidate	Votes	%	±%
Labour	Annette King	10,352	46.42	
National	Graeme Reeves	7,757	34.78	−8.71
Alliance	Jody Hamilton	2,590	11.61	
NZ First	Andrew Campbell	960	4.30	
Christian Heritage	Robin Corner	353	1.58	
McGillicuddy Serious	Hellen Sarah Thornton	187	0.83	
Natural Law	Wayne Shepard	65	0.29	
Private Enterprise	Frank Moncur	35	0.15	+0.07
Majority		2,595	11.63	
Turnout		22,299	85.85	−0.65
Registered electors		25,972		

=== 1990 election ===
1990 general election: Miramar
Party	Candidate	Votes	%	±%
National	Graeme Reeves	8,789	43.49	
Labour	Peter Neilson	8,237	40.76	−16.51
Green	Denis Foot	1,914	9.47	
NewLabour	Josie Bullock	965	4.77	
McGillicuddy Serious	John Morrison	123	0.60	
Democrats	David Coad	69	0.34	−1.97
Social Credit	C J Whittaker	64	0.31	
Independent	M Day	29	0.14	
Private Enterprise	Frank Moncur	17	0.08	−0.07
Majority		552	2.73	
Turnout		20,207	86.50	−1.29
Registered electors		23,359		

=== 1987 election ===
1987 general election: Miramar
Party	Candidate	Votes	%	±%
Labour	Peter Neilson	11,556	57.27	+7.89
National	Ian Macfarlane	7,495	37.14	
Democrats	David Coad	468	2.31	
Independent	Viv Walker	433	2.14	
McGillicuddy Serious	Stephen Miles Smith	143	0.70	
NZ Party	Brian Purvis	50	0.24	
Private Enterprise	Frank Moncur	32	0.15	+0.02
Majority		4,061	20.12	+4.56
Turnout		20,177	87.79	−5.60
Registered electors		22,983		

=== 1984 election ===
1984 general election: Miramar
Party	Candidate	Votes	%	±%
Labour	Peter Neilson	11,102	49.38	+3.53
National	Don Crosbie	7,603	33.81	
NZ Party	Mike Bungay	3,424	15.22	
Social Credit	P M Lines	279	1.24	
Independent	John Kirk	43	0.19	
Private Enterprise	Frank Moncur	31	0.13	
Majority		3,499	15.56	+12.93
Turnout		22,482	93.39	+2.90
Registered electors		24,072		

=== 1981 election ===
1981 general election: Miramar
Party	Candidate	Votes	%	±%
Labour	Peter Neilson	9,821	45.85	
National	Bill Young	9,172	42.82	−1.51
Social Credit	Rod Carlisle	2,303	10.75	+0.84
Independent	G N McCardle	121	0.56	
Majority		649	3.03	
Turnout		21,417	90.49	+22.42
Registered electors		23,667		

=== 1978 election ===
1978 general election: Miramar
Party	Candidate	Votes	%	±%
National	Bill Young	9,236	44.33	−5.60
Labour	Bill Jeffries	8,921	42.82	
Social Credit	Rod Carlisle	2,065	9.91	
Values	Denis Welch	611	2.93	
Majority		315	1.51	−7.76
Turnout		20,833	65.07	−16.73
Registered electors		32,014		

=== 1975 election ===
1975 general election: Miramar
Party	Candidate	Votes	%	±%
National	Bill Young	9,413	49.93	+2.72
Labour	John Wybrow	7,664	40.65	
Values	Cathy Wilson	956	5.07	
Social Credit	Frederick Joseph Charles Morgan	773	4.10	+0.25
Independent	George Nieris	45	0.23	
Majority		1,749	9.27	+6.80
Turnout		18,851	81.80	−9.21
Registered electors		23,044		

=== 1972 election ===
1972 general election: Miramar
Party	Candidate	Votes	%	±%
National	Bill Young	8,294	47.21	−5.35
Labour	Brian Edwards	7,860	44.74	
Social Credit	Frederick Joseph Charles Morgan	677	3.85	−1.31
Values	D Tindill	630	3.58	
New Democratic	K Boyd	54	0.30	
Independent	J D Howard	50	0.28	
Majority		434	2.47	−7.82
Turnout		17,565	91.01	+0.77
Registered electors		19,299		

=== 1969 election ===
1969 general election: Miramar
Party	Candidate	Votes	%	±%
National	Bill Young	9,134	52.56	+5.91
Labour	Charles Troughton	7,345	42.26	
Social Credit	Frederick Joseph Charles Morgan	898	5.16	−2.40
Majority		1,789	10.29	+9.42
Turnout		17,377	90.24	+3.79
Registered electors		19,255		

=== 1966 election ===
1966 general election: Miramar
Party	Candidate	Votes	%	±%
National	Bill Young	7,767	46.65	−0.21
Labour	Bill Fox	7,621	45.78	−3.50
Social Credit	Frederick Joseph Charles Morgan	1,259	7.56	
Majority		146	0.87	
Turnout		16,647	86.45	−4.99
Registered electors		19,255		

=== 1963 election ===
1963 general election: Miramar
Party	Candidate	Votes	%	±%
Labour	Bill Fox	8,465	49.28	+0.72
National	Bill Young	8,049	46.86	
Social Credit	George Johnson	662	3.85	
Majority		416	2.42	−0.73
Turnout		17,176	91.44	+2.06
Registered electors		18,782		

=== 1960 election ===
1960 general election: Miramar
Party	Candidate	Votes	%	±%
Labour	Bill Fox	7,186	48.56	−5.76
National	Bernard Lewis Lyons	6,719	45.40	
Social Credit	Robert William Johnson	893	6.03	+1.28
Majority		467	3.15	−10.25
Turnout		14,798	89.38	−4.11
Registered electors		16,555		

=== 1957 election ===
1957 general election: Miramar
Party	Candidate	Votes	%	±%
Labour	Bill Fox	8,417	54.32	+2.51
National	Clevedon Costello	6,340	40.92	
Social Credit	Robert William Johnson	736	4.75	
Majority		2,077	13.40	+2.96
Turnout		15,493	93.49	+5.32
Registered electors		16,571		

=== 1954 election ===
1954 general election: Miramar
Party	Candidate	Votes	%	±%
Labour	Bill Fox	7,576	51.81	
National	Robert John McConnell	6,049	41.37	
Social Credit	Roy Matheson Gunn	998	6.82	
Majority		1,527	10.44	
Turnout		14,623	88.17	−3.11
Registered electors		16,584		

=== 1951 election ===
1951 general election: Miramar
Party	Candidate	Votes	%	±%
Labour	Bob Semple	6,785	53.59	−0.49
National	Cuthbert Taylor	5,878	46.41	+2.22
Majority		501	3.95	−5.93
Turnout		12,663	85.63	−5.65
Registered electors		14,788		

=== 1949 election ===
1949 general election: Miramar
Party	Candidate	Votes	%	±%
Labour	Bob Semple	7,193	54.08	−5.02
National	Cuthbert Taylor	5,878	44.19	
Communist	Kenneth Stanton	229	1.72	
Majority		1,315	9.88	−8.30
Turnout		13,300	91.28	+1.29
Registered electors		14,570		

=== 1946 election ===
1946 general election: Miramar
Party	Candidate	Votes	%	±%
Labour	Bob Semple	8,064	59.10	
National	Len Jacobsen	5,582	40.90	
Majority		2,482	18.18	
Turnout		13,646	90.99	
Registered electors		14,996		
