= Mick Moohan =

New Zealand politician

The Honourable Mick Moohan
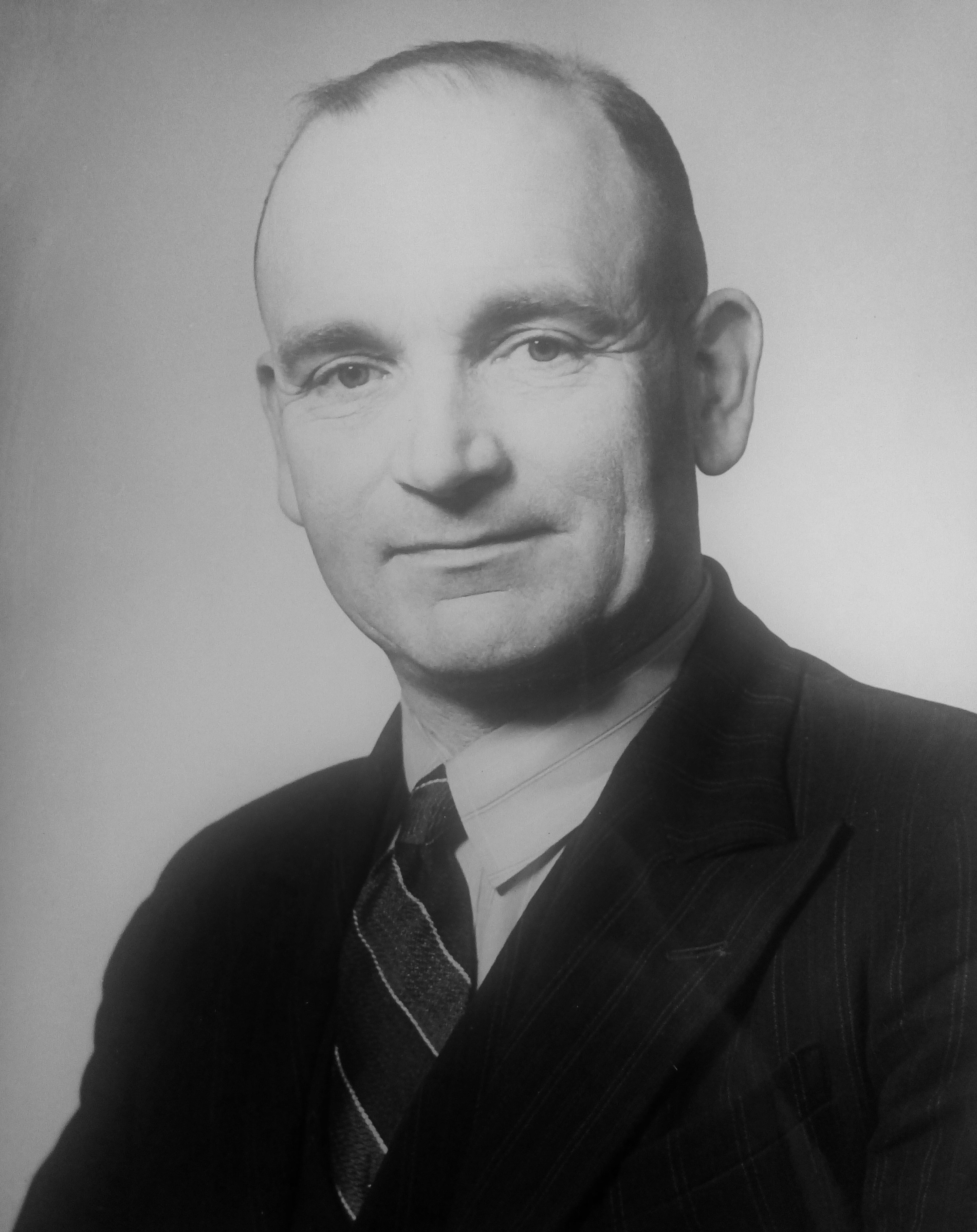

17th Minister of Railways
- In office 8 December 1957 – 31 August 1960
- Prime Minister: Walter Nash
- Preceded by: John McAlpine
- Succeeded by: John McAlpine

36th Postmaster-General
- In office 8 December 1957 – 31 August 1960
- Prime Minister: Walter Nash
- Preceded by: Tom Shand
- Succeeded by: Thomas Hayman

18th President of the Labour Party
- In office 17 May 1955 – 8 June 1960
- Vice President: Martyn Finlay
- Preceded by: Arnold Nordmeyer
- Succeeded by: Martyn Finlay

Member of the New Zealand Parliament for Petone
- In office 27 November 1946 – 7 February 1967
- Succeeded by: Fraser Colman

Personal details
- Born: Michael Moohan; 27 April 1899 Garrison, County Fermanagh, Ireland
- Died: 7 February 1967 (aged 67) Lower Hutt, New Zealand
- Party: Labour
- Spouse: Cecilia Hayman
- Children: 5
- Profession: Engineer

Michael Moohan (27 April 1899 – 7 February 1967) was a New Zealand politician of the Labour Party. Seldom known to anyone by anything other than "Mick", he was a major organisational figure in the Labour Party's early history and went on to become a significant politician in his own right as an MP and cabinet minister.

== Biography ==
=== Early life ===
Moohan was born in Garrison, County Fermanagh, Ireland, in 1899, he was brought up in Manchester, England. He was apprenticed to the engineering trade. He served with the 2nd Division, Royal Engineers during World War I in France and then in the Army of Occupation, the Army of the Rhine. Returned to England where the land 'fit for heroes' didn't emerge and emigrated to New Zealand in 1922, where he joined the Labour Party. In 1923 he married Selina (Cely) Heyman who arrived from Manchester prior to his arrival; they had one son and four daughters.

After arriving in New Zealand Moohan found employment with the technical staff of the New Zealand Post and Telegraph Department and was stationed in Raetihi. There he became active in support of Labour in the Waimarino County. He was elected a member of the Ohakune Borough Council from 1932 to 1935, also serving as deputy mayor. After, leaving Waimarino for Auckland, he was elected vice-president and later as secretary of the Auckland Labour Representation Committee. He joined Labour's national office as an assistant secretary in 1937, and in 1940 was elected as Labour's national secretary-treasurer.

=== Member of Parliament ===
New Zealand Parliament
Years	Term	Electorate	Party
1946–1949	28th	Petone	Labour
1949–1951	29th	Petone	Labour
1951–1954	30th	Petone	Labour
1954–1957	31st	Petone	Labour
1957–1960	32nd	Petone	Labour
1960–1963	33rd	Petone	Labour
1963–1966	34th	Petone	Labour
1966–1967	35th	Petone	Labour

Moohan was elected the Member of Parliament for the new electorate of Petone in 1946 and served until 1967, when he died. He fought off deputy leader Walter Nash for the Labour nomination who indicated his preference for contesting the Petone seat after an electoral redistribution occurred which made his seat of Hutt more marginal.

Moohan was described by contemporaries as a colourful character and effective debater. Attributed to his Irish upbringing he was described as a versatile speaker who could infuse almost any speech with an entertaining and effective mixture of both 'banter and bite'. Closer colleagues however also noted his underhanded and expedient nature. Nash said of him "He [Moohan] was a sly fellow, oozing bonhomie, with an instinct for low politics."

From 1947 to 1949 he was Under-Secretary to the Prime Minister. He was appointed by Peter Fraser to oversee the government's post-war state housing scheme. In 1951 he was nominated to stand for the deputy leadership of the party, but he declined the nomination. Moohan was a critic of Nash's leadership and helped organise a leadership challenge against him in 1954, though in the event switched sides and voted for Nash due to the increasing unpopularity of a leadership change among party members.

In 1953, Moohan was awarded the Queen Elizabeth II Coronation Medal.

During the intervening time he also served as the Labour Party's president between 1955 and 1960 and served as Labour's campaign manager in the successful 1957 election.

He was both Minister of Railways and Postmaster-General and Minister of Telegraphs in the Second Labour Government from 1957 to 1960. As one of Labour's most experienced MPs Moohan naturally expected to be given a major ministerial portfolio. It was a surprise for many, and in particular himself, when he was allocated only two relatively innocuous postings. He was not even allocated a front bench seat and made no secret of his disappointment. In 1959 he travelled to Warsaw as a delegate to the International Parliamentary Union and then went to London to study developments in telephone cable and postal procedures. His main accomplishment was the construction of a state of the art rail ferry, the Aramoana, to operate across Cook Strait.

Despite his cabinet ranking, Moohan was one of a group of three Labour MPs (the others being Bill Fox and Frank Kitts) who were deeply critical of the decisions made in the "Black Budget". From then on he became the chief critic within the Labour Party of Arnold Nordmeyer the Minister of Finance and was involved in several political manoeuvres to block him from the leadership of the party.

However Nordmeyer eventually replaced Nash as leader and Moohan began agitating against the party leadership once again. Alongside Bill Fox and Warren Freer, he was one of the few senior Labour MPs who backed Norman Kirk's successful challenge to Nordmeyer in 1965. Kirk promoted him to the frontbench and he became a close confidant of Kirk's until his death.

=== Death ===
Moohan had been indifferent health and was absent from Parliament for seven weeks in July and August 1966 suffering from a throat complaint. He died at his home in Lower Hutt on 7 February 1967, aged 68, survived by his wife and five children. Coincidentally he died just hours apart from another previous Labour Party president James Roberts. He was buried at the Taitā Lawn Cemetery in Lower Hutt.

== Moohan Rocket ==
On 16 February 1960 a special ministerial train dubbed the Moohan Rocket made a trip from Wellington to Auckland on the North Island Main Trunk, taking 11 hours and 45 minutes, or 2½ hours less than the steam-hauled Night Limited. As the train of a brake van, three first-class cars and a Ministerial car at the rear only weighed 147 tons, and was hauled by two D^{G} class locomotives, the time was somewhat disappointing. The return trip two days later behind a single D^{A} class locomotive was slightly quicker at 11 hours and 34 minutes, though the superior D^{A} could not then run through the tunnels north of Wellington and the two DGs took over at Palmerston North. The train reflected Moohan's idea of a fast and comfortable intercity service later seen in the Silver Star and Silver Fern.

== Notes ==
Political offices
Preceded by John McAlpine	Minister of Railways; 1957–1960	Succeeded by John McAlpine
Preceded by Tom Shand	Postmaster-General; 1957–1960	Succeeded by Thomas Hayman
New Zealand Parliament
New constituency	Member of Parliament for Petone; 1946–1967	Succeeded by Fraser Colman
Party political offices
Preceded by Arnold Nordmeyer	President of the Labour Party; 1955–1960	Succeeded by Martyn Finlay
Preceded by David Wilson	Secretary of the Labour Party; 1940–1948	Succeeded by Allan McDonald
