= List of political scandals in New Zealand =

The following is a list of governmental and public sector scandals in New Zealand. While New Zealand generally scores very well on international indices of corruption, there have been several notable high-profile scandals including cases of cover-ups relating to politics, economics, or public sector debacles, or to the private lives of individual government representatives.

== List of scandals ==
=== 1870s ===
- 1879
  - The "Luckie incident". John Ballance, the Colonial Treasurer, appointed journalist and former MP David Luckie as Government Insurance Commissioner. Luckie was editor of The Evening Post and had been a consistent supporter of the Government in his editorials. While Ballance thought Luckie as able and good a man as he could get for the position, the appointment was viewed as political. There was further controversy regarding Luckie's salary which was offered at £800 per annum which caused an argument between Ballance and several other ministers thinking it should be far lower. The £800 salary was eventually set by parliament.

=== 1890s ===
- 1892
  - Arthur Winton Brown, the Mayor of Wellington, absconds to Australia to escape the consequences of the possible collapse of his businesses.
- 1898
  - Liberal Party MP William Larnach commits suicide in a parliament committee room, the result of impending financial disasters and (reputedly) rumours over a sexual relationship between his wife and her step-son.
- 1899
  - The "Marine Scandal". John Hutcheson fellow MP Frederick Pirani accused Prime Minister Richard Seddon and Minister of Marine William Hall-Jones of using ministerial influence in order to obtain Mariners certificates for unqualified candidates, which was in contravention to the recent Shipping and Seamen's Act. However, the Marine Commission report declared that the charges were unfounded. Hutcheson resigned his seat in order to exonerate himself triggering a by-election, which he won.

=== 1900s ===
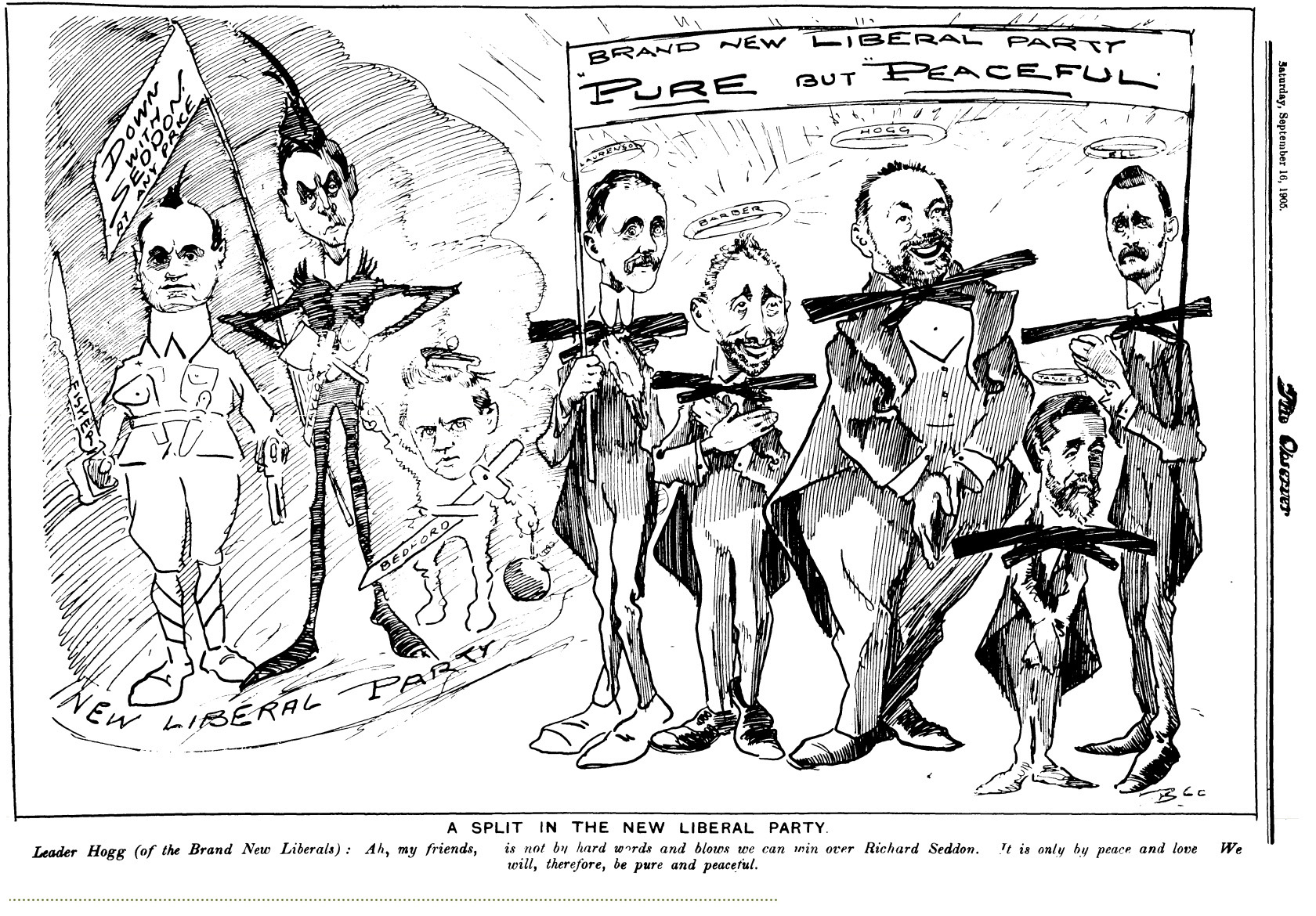
A cartoon depicting the "Voucher incident" showing New Liberal moderates distancing themselves from Fisher.

- 1905
  - Francis Fisher, a ringleader of the New Liberal Party caused controversy in the so-called "voucher incident", in which he alleged that Richard Seddon's son had been received payment from a government department for work he had not done. The allegations were subsequently disproven, and the New Liberals suffered considerable public backlash.

=== 1910s ===
- 1918
  - MP Paddy Webb is controversially sent to jail for refusing military service.

=== 1920s ===
- 1920
  - Charles Mackay the Mayor of Wanganui was convicted of the attempted murder of Walter D'Arcy Cresswell, who had been blackmailing Mackay to expose his homosexuality to the public and discredit him.

=== 1930s ===
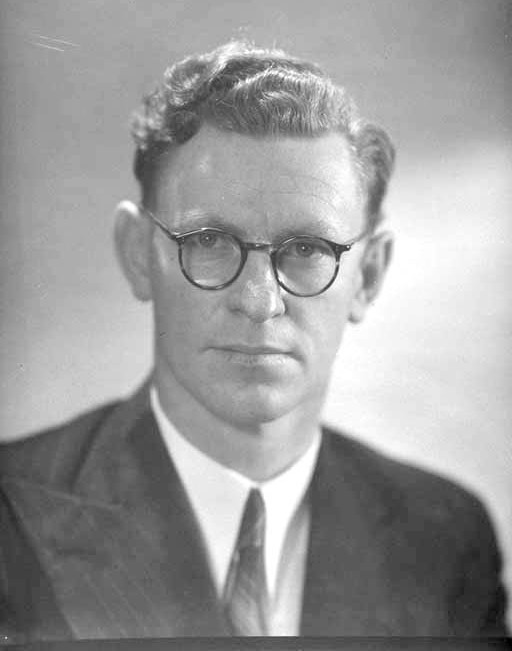
"Uncle Scrim" (Rev. Colin Scrimgeour) was at the centre of a political scandal in 1935.

- 1934
  - Sir Āpirana Ngata then Minister of Native Affairs in the United-Reform Coalition government resigns as minister after accusations of departmental maladministration and favouritism were supported by a Royal Commission.
- 1935
  - Officials from New Zealand's national radio service, at the time part of the New Zealand Post Office, attempt to block a broadcast by the popular Rev. Colin Scrimgeour, fearing that he would advise his listeners to vote for the opposition Labour Party. The Coalition government is implicated, causing a furore.
- 1938–40
  - The Lee Affair: Severe disharmony is caused within the Labour Party by a long running feud between Prime Minister Michael Joseph Savage and senior Labour Party member John A. Lee.

=== 1940s ===
- 1941
  - The 'Nathan Incident': a scandal developed revolving around Hubert Nathan, a Citizens' Association candidate for the Wellington Harbour Board who was critical of the number of union secretaries on the Labour ticket for the 1941 civic elections. Nathan alleged that 5 unionists used "Gestapo tactics" to try and blackmail him into withdrawing his nomination and accusing them of Antisemitism. The press ran articles on the alleged confrontation (which was refuted by Labour) and as a result no Labour candidates were elected to any of the three local authorities in Wellington until 1950.
- 1942
  - Bert Kyle resigned from the National Party at the climax of a personality feud with leader Sidney Holland. Kyle publicly accused Holland of blackmailing him into becoming a "yes man" or be expelled from the party. Kyle remained an independent MP and retired at the 1943 election.

=== 1950s ===
- 1956
  - In February 1956, Prime Minister Sidney Holland announced that Dean Eyre, the Minister of Industries and Commerce and Minister of Customs, had been granted six weeks leave in order to attend to private business in Sweden. The Leader of the Opposition, Walter Nash, was critical of the decision. Nash questioned the appropriateness of a minister of the crown conducting his private business abroad. Holland was quick to dismiss any suggestion of impropriety, but was soon to swallow his words. Both The Evening Post and The Dominion (Wellington papers who normally wrote editorials slanted in favour of National) also went on the attack in editorials, urging Holland to reconsider. A surprised Holland reacted quickly and Eyre was forced to cancel his trip, and was stripped of his portfolios and given to Eric Halstead. To ease the situation, Eyre was allocated Halstead's portfolios of Social Security and Tourism instead.
- 1959
  - Truth (NZ) Ltd v Holloway: In March 1959 the tabloid newspaper New Zealand Truth quoted Warren Freer, MP for Mount Albert, as having stated "See Phil, and Phil will fix it" to Henry Judd, an émigré importer, insinuating Phil Holloway the Minister of Industries and Commerce (who was in charge of import controls) could grant Judd an ease-of-passage remedy for controlled imports. The allegation evolved into a libel case in which Holloway was eventually awarded £11,000 in damages and a further £800 in costs.

=== 1960s ===
- 1966
  - The Mason Affair: New Labour Party leader Norman Kirk, wishing to rejuvenate the party, puts pressure on Rex Mason and several other elderly MPs to retire. A messy deselection of Mason occurred causing bad publicity for Labour ahead of that years election with several party officeholders in Mason's electorate resigning in protest of his forced retirement.

=== 1970s ===
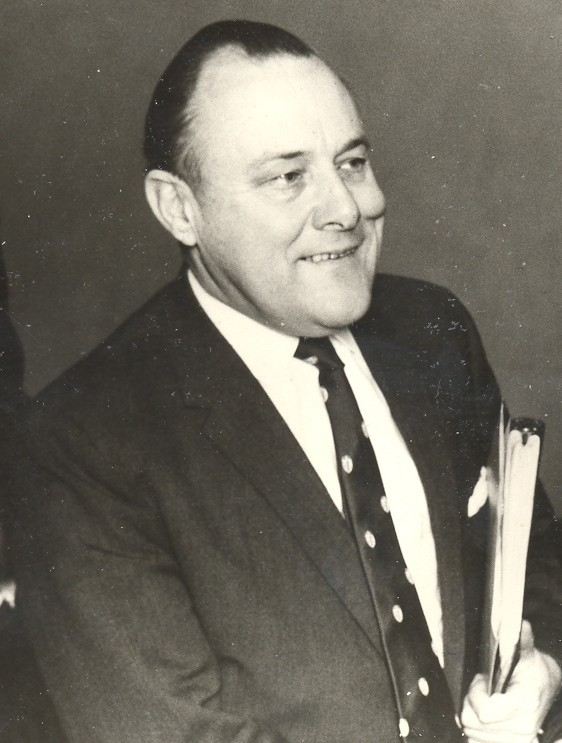
Sir Robert Muldoon was at the centre of several political controversies during his time as Prime Minister (1975–1984).

- 1970
  - A public leadership struggle between Vernon Cracknell and his deputy John O'Brien for leadership of the Social Credit Party ended in controversy. O'Brien was the victor, but his confrontational style caused him to lose his position after only a short time in office. He then split from Social Credit, founding his own New Democratic Party.
- 1976
  - Fitzgerald v Muldoon: Prime Minister Robert Muldoon advised the Governor-General to abolish Labour's superannuation scheme without new legislation. In the case it was found that revoking a law in such a manner without consent of Parliament was illegal under the Bill of Rights 1689.
  - Labour MP Gerald O'Brien is charged with molesting two boys, but the case is thrown out. Despite this, he was subsequently deselected as Labour's candidate for Island Bay and failed to secure re-election as an independent.
- 1977
  - The Moyle Affair: Muldoon accuses high-ranking Labour Party MP Colin Moyle of having been questioned by the police on suspicion of homosexual activities, at that time illegal in New Zealand. Moyle is forced to resign from parliament.
  - Muldoon advised Queen Elizabeth II to appoint Sir Keith Holyoake as Governor-General upon Sir Denis Blundell's term ending. As the Governor-General is a non-partisan position this caused much controversy with Labour leader Bill Rowling criticising the appointment as cronyism and complaining that he had not been consulted on the appointment, stating he would remove Holyoake should Labour win the 1978 general election.

=== 1980s ===
- 1980
  - September: The Marginal Loans Affair: Minister of Agriculture Duncan MacIntyre gave a Marginal Land Boards loan to his daughter and son-in-law for a Wellington property they purchased. A public inquiry later concluded that MacIntyre had not acted willfully improperly, though there were several public resignations of National Party officeholders in MacIntyre's East Cape electorate.
  - October: Former deputy mayor of Lower Hutt, John Seddon, applied for the position of Town Clerk of the Porirua City Council. His appointment, shortly before the 1980 local body elections, triggered controversy, with allegations that it had been a "jack up" by the Labour majority on the Porirua City Council and Seddon's friendship with John Burke. A group of senior Porirua City Council officers jointly signed a letter during the appointment row saying he wasn't the right man for the job as Seddon was not a qualified accountant, the usual prior professional qualification of town clerks at that time, but he had been responsible for managing a company with three times the turnover of the Porirua City Council. Ombudsman Lester Castle was called in to investigate and eventually cleared the appointment process as being sufficiently objective. Following the 1980 elections Labour lost their majority on the council.
- 1984
  - Independent MP John Kirk (formerly Labour Party) and the son of former Prime Minister Norman Kirk, absconds, owing more than $280,000. He is arrested in the US, held in prison, and then extradited to New Zealand.
  - Following the 1984 general election, a constitutional crisis occurred when Muldoon refused to act on instruction of the incoming government, causing a growing currency crisis to worsen. Eventually he relented, after his position as National Party leader was threatened by members of his caucus. Prior to the snap election, Muldoon had announced its date to journalists while being very clearly drunk.
  - National Cabinet Minister Keith Allen died. Immediately prior to his death Muldoon had refused to accept Allen's resignation from cabinet. Allen found the burdens of holding the office combined with his worsening affliction of diabetes were making his life too stressful. Other National MPs such as Hugh Templeton and Don McKinnon think Muldoon's harsh treatment of Allen contributed significantly to his premature death.
- 1986-1987
  - The Māori loan affair: an unauthorised attempt by the Department of Māori Affairs to raise money overseas for Māori development.

=== 1990s ===
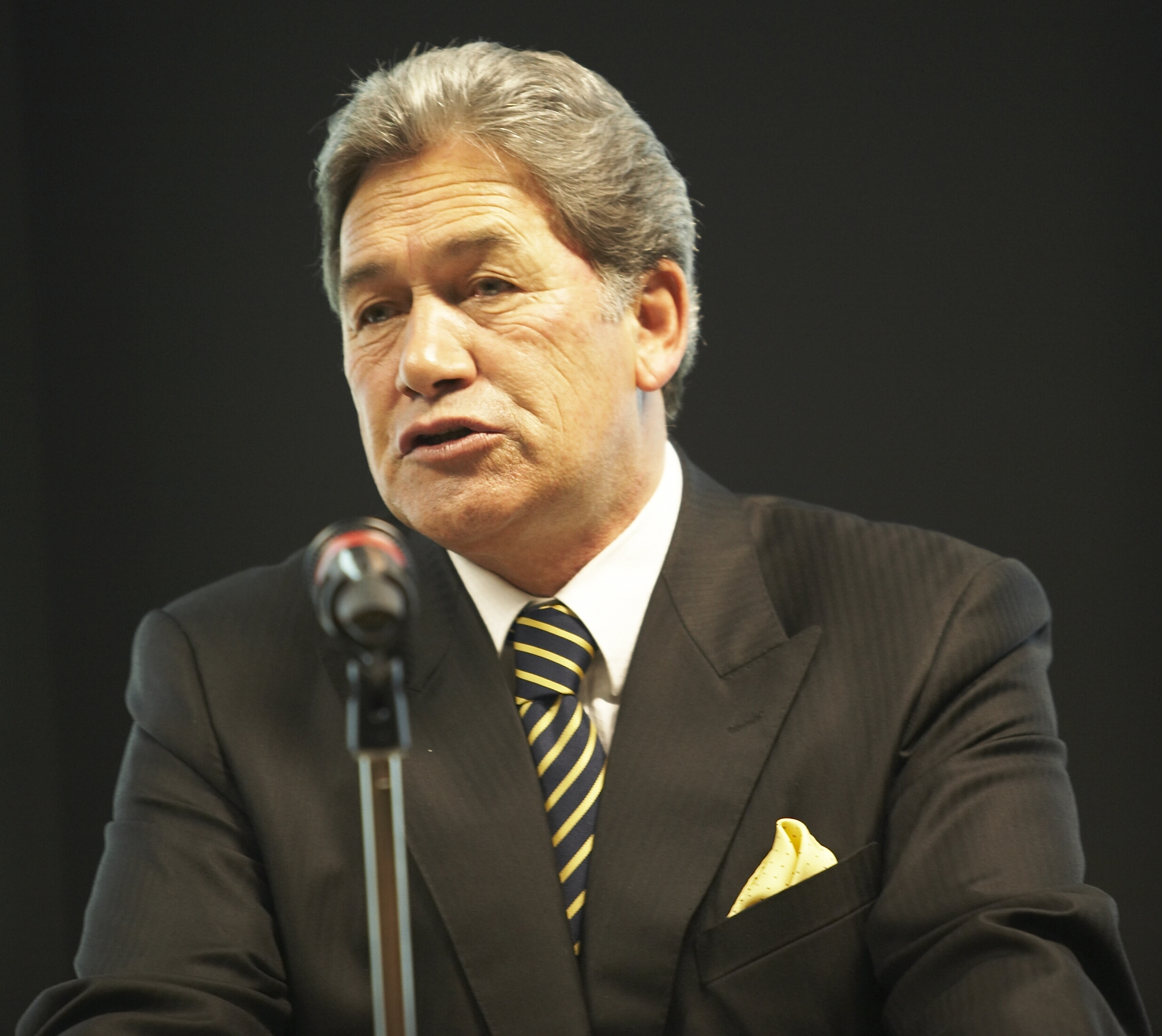
Populist New Zealand First MP Winston Peters was responsible for the release to parliament of the papers which led to the Winebox Inquiry.

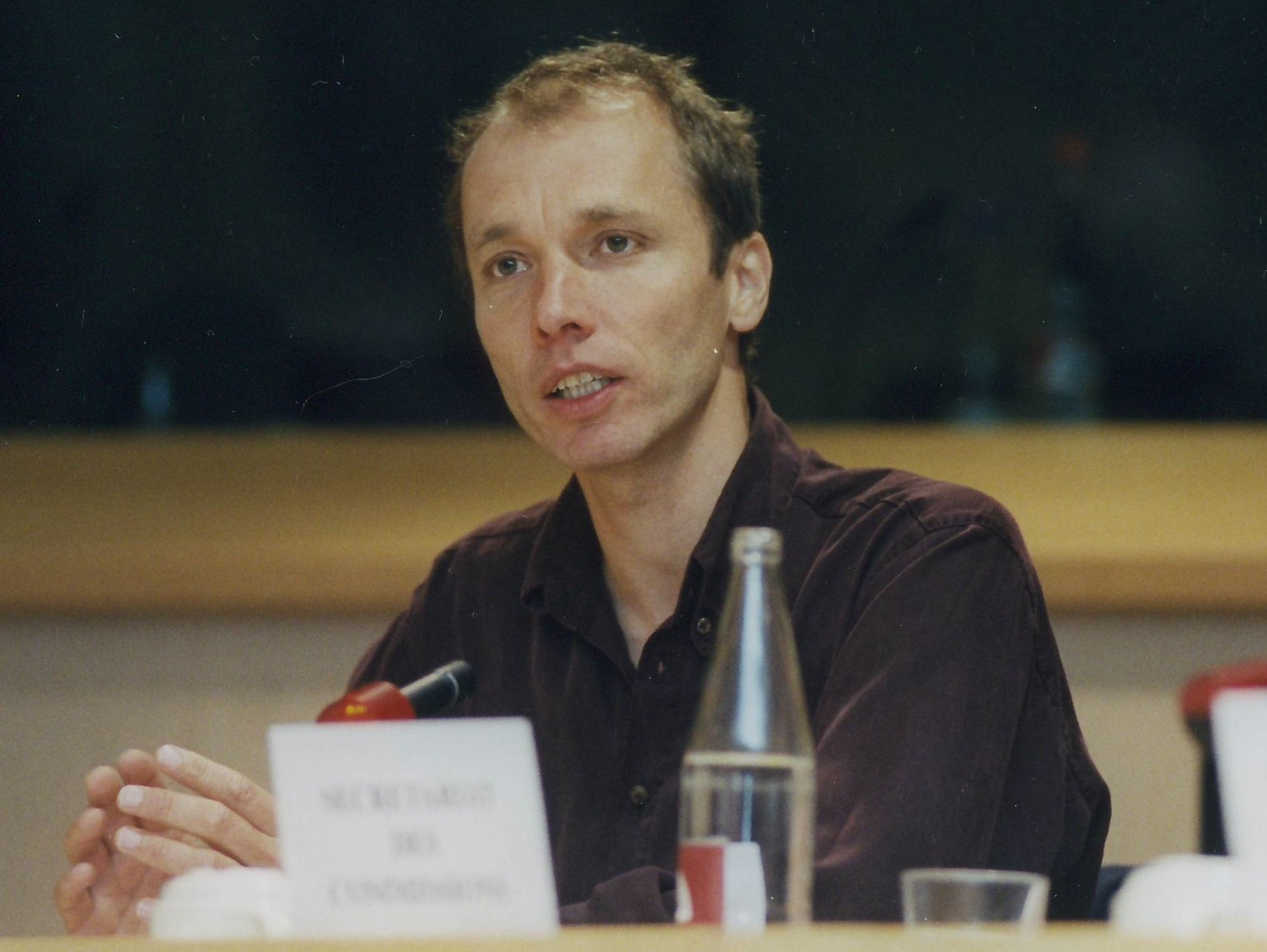
Investigative journalist Nicky Hager, whose books – most notably The Hollow Men and Dirty Politics – have explored several political scandals since the 1990s.

- 1992
  - Rebel National MP Gilbert Myles instigated a political scandal in September 1992 when he accused former Labour MP Fred Gerbic of operating a graft while he was a minister. Myles, under Parliamentary privilege, alleged that Gerbic took financial donations in exchange for residency approvals in his capacity as associate Minister of Immigration and in support tabled a transcript of an alleged tape recorded conversation between two Auckland Labour Party members. In response Gerbic denied the allegations and maintained his innocence throughout. The claims were investigated by John McGrath QC who, in November 1993, found no evidence of impropriety by Gerbic and dismissed Myles' claims.
- 1994
  - The Winebox Inquiry investigates alleged corruption and incompetence in both the Serious Fraud Office and Inland Revenue Department. The inquiry is instigated after revelations by New Zealand First MP Winston Peters, and named after his habit of keeping the allegation documents in a winebox.
- 1995–96
  - The "Antoinette Beck" affair: National/New Zealand First MP Michael Laws resigns after being subject to a conflict of interest inquiry over employing a company partly owned by his wife to conduct a poll, signed off by a non-existent "Antoinette Beck".
- 1996
  - Governor General Sir Michael Hardie Boys causes controversy over openly stating his opposition to Minister of Youth Affairs Deborah Morris's suggestion that young people have access to contraceptives.
- 1999
  - March: The Integrated National Crime Information System, a computer network intended to be used in coordination of police resources, reported to have massive cost over-runs and operational problems.
  - October: New Zealand First MP Tuariki John Delamere is forced to resign as Minister of Immigration after it emerged that he had approved permanent residency for a group of Chinese businessmen provided they invested generously in various Māori development schemes.

=== 2000s ===
- 2000
  - Labour Party MP Dover Samuels resigns as Minister of Maori Affairs pending an investigation into alleged sex crimes he had committed before he entered politics.
- 2001
  - Lawyer, judge, and New Zealand's 17th Governor General Sir Michael Hardie Boys creates controversy after making an implied critique of the Clark Labour Government's plan to scrap the air defence wing of the Royal New Zealand Air Force.
- 2002
  - Corngate: an investigation into the alleged release of genetically modified corn, exacerbated by an ambush interview with Prime Minister Helen Clark by broadcaster John Campbell.
- 2005
  - June: Graham Capill, former leader of the Christian Heritage Party is convicted of paedophilia-related charges and serves six years in prison. Christian Heritage disbands the following year in the wake of the scandal.
  - August: Former ACT Party MP Donna Awatere Huata is convicted on fraud charges involving a trust set up to help underprivileged Māori children.
  - November: Election funding controversy: during the 2005 New Zealand general election there were widespread allegations of overspending of political electioneering budgets against most major parties, as well as an anonymous hate campaign against the Labour and Green Party by a religious sect, the Exclusive Brethren.
- 2006
  - The Hollow Men, a book by investigative reporter Nicky Hager, reports tactics allegedly used by the National Party in the previous year's elections. Much of the information provided came from leaked documents.
- 2007
  - New Zealand Labour Party (later New Zealand Pacific Party) MP Taito Philip Field is arrested on corruption and bribery charges. He eventually serves two years in prison.
- 2009
  - National Cabinet Minister Richard Worth resigns after allegations of sexual harassment on his behalf became public. No charges are laid by police.
  - Minister for Social Development and Employment Paula Bennett releases the benefit details of two beneficiaries who had criticised the Government's policy of getting rid of the Training Initiative Allowance (TIA), leading to complaints about breaches of privacy which end up being taken to the Privacy Commissioner. After closing the investigation, the Privacy Commissioner forwarded the Director of Human Rights Proceedings who announced the resolution of the complaint in 2012, stating that the matter had been resolved to the satisfaction of all parties.
- Since late 2000s
  - Leaky homes crisis: changes to building regulations and practices in the 1990s result in a large number of newer houses being severely susceptible to leaks and mould. Government prevarication on financial recompense leads to major public outrage.

=== 2010s ===
- 2010
  - April: The Government sacks the 14 elected members of Environment Canterbury (Canterbury Regional Council), replacing them with seven appointed commissioners.
  - June: Labour Party MP Shane Jones admits to using a ministerial credit card records to hire pornographic videos while travelling on government business. He is demoted from his shadow cabinet status.
  - September: ACT Party Member David Garrett, the primary party advocate on tougher sentences and ending name suppression in ongoing court cases, admits stealing the identity of a dead infant for the purpose of obtaining a passport 26 years prior. Garrett subsequently resigns.
  - October: Supreme Court Justice Bill Wilson is forced to stand down after being accused of judicial misconduct.

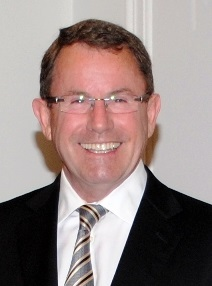
ACT Party leader John Banks was in the headlines for the wrong reasons in both 2011 and 2014.

- 2011
  - March: Investigation of sexual assault allegations made against Labour Party MP Darren Hughes. Then Labour Party leader Phil Goff had known of allegations for two weeks before they became public. Hughes resigned, and police later determined there was insufficient evidence to launch a prosecution.
  - November: Tea tape scandal: A meeting between Prime Minister John Key and ACT Party leader John Banks is recorded by a news journalist. The freedom of the press and the privacy of ostensibly public discussions (the meeting took place in a public area) are widely debated in a case which involves both police and lawyers. Key later settled a defamation claim brought by the journalist involved.
- 2013
  - February: Major problems with payroll system Novopay, used primarily by the Ministry of Education to pay teachers' salaries, causes many teachers to be underpaid, overpaid, or not paid at all for several months. Several other government departments are also affected. It is revealed that the system was approved by the government despite serious technical design flaws revealed during its testing period.
  - June: United Future leader Peter Dunne resigns as a minister following a leak enquiry over the release of a report about the GCSB. The Inquiry is later subject to the Privileges Committee Inquiry over its methods as the person heading the Inquiry had obtained journalist's records from the Parliamentary Service.
- 2014
  - June: ACT Party leader John Banks is convicted of filing a false electoral return in 2010, recording donations known to come from SkyCity Auckland and Kim Dotcom as anonymous. The conviction is overturned on appeal in 2015.
  - August: National Party cabinet minister Judith Collins stands down temporarily from her portfolios following accusations of a conflict of interest, after an overseas trip where she was accused of promoting milk products produced by Oravida, a New Zealand company of which her husband is a director. Later in the year, claims emerge in Nicky Hager's book Dirty Politics that Collins had passed on private information about public servants to right-wing attack-blogger Cameron Slater. However, an investigation by a High Court judge cleared her of any wrongdoing, stating there was no evidence that Collins had acted inappropriately. She was re-instated to her Ministerial portfolios in 2015.
  - September: The National Party used a song similar to a hit by US rapper Eminem in a campaign ad during that year's election. The song's publishers filed a lawsuit against National for copyright violation stating they did not give consent for the song to be used in a political ad, a claim which National denies.

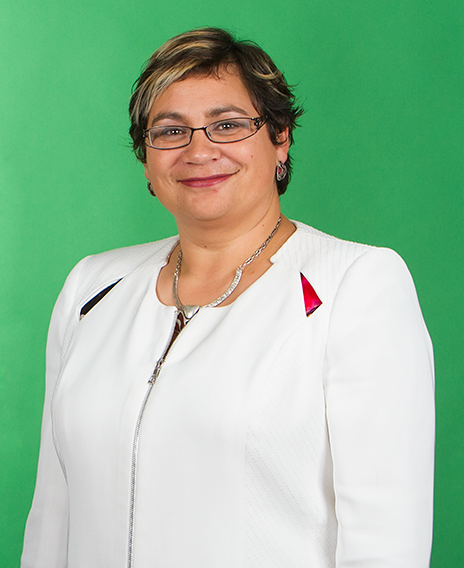
Green Party Leader Metiria Turei was at the centre of a benefit fraud scandal in 2017.

- 2015
  - January: National Party MP Mike Sabin resigns from parliament "due to personal issues that were best dealt with outside Parliament" one month after it is revealed that he is under investigation by police for assault.
  - April: Controversy surrounding Prime Minister John Key's pulling of a waitress's ponytail, later dubbed 'ponygate'.
  - May: National cabinet minister Murray McCully is involved in the controversial setting up of a sheep farm in Saudi Arabia in partnership with Saudi businessman Hamood Al-Ali Al-Khalaf, seemingly to negate the risk of Al-Khalaf suing the New Zealand government.
  - September: Conservative Party leader Colin Craig resigns as party leader amid allegations of sexual harassment of his former secretary. In the messy leadership dispute which follows, Craig is suspended by the party.
- 2016
  - Colin Craig (see above) cited in court during defamation case taken against him relating to sexual harassment allegations.

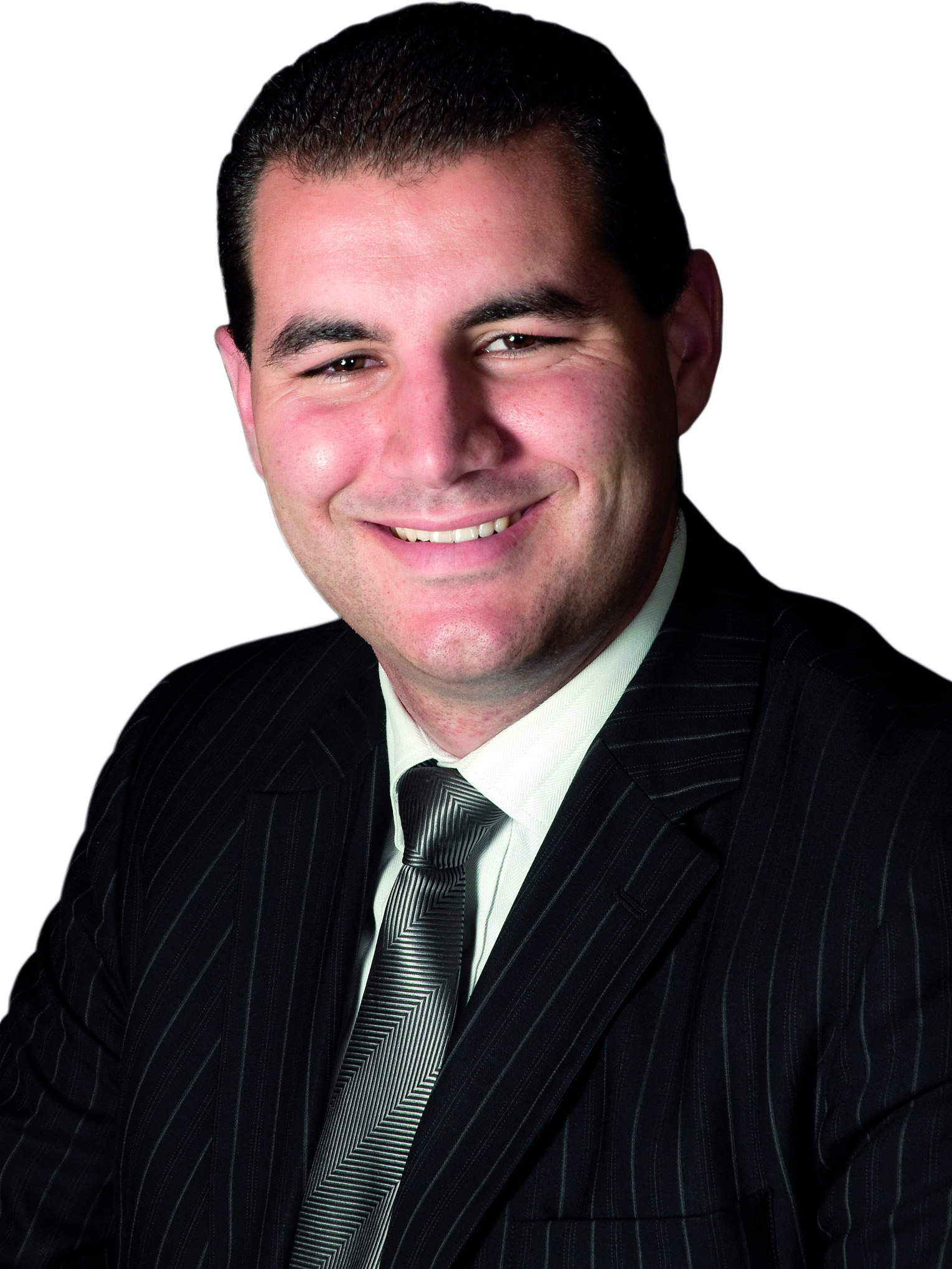
National Party MP Jami-Lee Ross was at the centre of a media frenzy in 2018.

- 2017
  - June: National MP Todd Barclay is accused of making a clandestine recording of Glenys Dickson, one of his staff, and offering her a hush payment from former Prime Minister John Key's leader's budget. Upon the incident becoming public, Barclay chose to retire from Parliament.
  - July: Green Party co-leader Metiria Turei reveals that she committed benefit fraud over a period of three years in the 1990s. The Ministry of Social Development launches an investigation into her benefit history in response. During the investigation, it also comes to light that Turei enrolled at an address where she was not living, in 1993, saying she did it to vote for a friend who was running as a candidate in that electorate. Turei resigns in August.
- 2018
  - August:
    - Labour Party MP and Minister of Broadcasting, Communications, and Digital Media Clare Curran is dismissed from cabinet after a series of incidents involving secret meetings between herself and Radio New Zealand broadcaster and senior manager Carol Hirschfeld and tech entrepreneur Derek Handley. She resigned as a minister the following month.
    - Labour Party MP Meka Whaitiri is stripped of her ministerial portfolios following allegations of physical and verbal bullying against staff. An official report into the altercations found that it was "probable" that Whaitiri grabbed and left bruising on her press secretary.
  - October: After a two-month investigation into leaks of information relating to the expenses of National Party leader Simon Bridges, Bridges announces that National MP Jami-Lee Ross was the source of the leaks. The following day Ross alleged during a live press conference that Bridges was a corrupt politician who had violated electoral law several times, including accepting an illegal NZ$100,000 donation from Chinese businessman Zhang Yikun. The National Party caucus voted to expel Ross for disloyalty. Ross released an audio recording between himself and Bridges on Facebook. Notably, it included Bridges describing National List MP Maureen Pugh as "fucking useless". On 18 October, a news report was released, with four women accusing Ross of incoherent rages, sexual harassment, and bullying behaviour.
- 2019
  - A high-up Labour Party staffer is accused of sexually assaulting a 19-year-old party volunteer; Labour Party President Nigel Haworth resigns amidst this scandal.

=== 2020s ===
==== 2020 ====
- January:
  - The Serious Fraud Office files criminal charges against four people in relation to an alleged $100,000 donation paid into a National Party electorate bank account. Simon Bridges stated neither he nor anyone from the National Party were among those charged in relation to the donation allegations. The Serious Fraud Office launched an investigation on 12 March 2019, after police referred on a complaint made by Jami-Lee Ross (see above: October 2018). However, following the investigation, the Court of Appeal quashed the convictions against three of the donors to the National Party, leaving the Serious Fraud Office case in ruins.
  - Speaker of the House, Trevor Mallard is sued by a parliamentary staff member who alleged that Mallard had defamed him by falsely claiming in May 2019 that a rapist was working at Parliament.
- July:
  - Labour Party MP and Minister of Health David Clark is demoted and then resigns as a Minister following repeated alleged breaches of COVID-19 lockdown guidelines.
  - National Party MP Hamish Walker admits to leaking confidential COVID-19 patient information to the press. The information had come to him via former National Party President Michelle Boag, who had received it while acting chief executive of the Auckland Rescue Helicopter trust.
  - National Party MP Andrew Falloon quit politics after sending an indecent image to a young woman. NZ Police subsequently reopened their investigation into Falloon after a number of other women came forward with complaints.

==== 2022 ====
- February: Speaker of the House, Trevor Mallard responds to an anti Covid mandate protest on Parliament's grounds by turning sprinklers on full and setting up loudspeakers playing music and pro-vaccination messages. Mallard is subsequently accused by parliamentary colleagues of antagonising the protestors. In May Mallard approves Parliament Security's issuing of 151 trespass notices against individuals who had participated in the Wellington anti-mandate protest. Five of these trespass notices were issued to former Members of Parliament, including NZ First MP, Winston Peters. Following Peters' threat to seek a judicial review of the trespass notices and media coverage, Mallard withdrew the trespass notices against the five former MPs. In response to the trespass notices against the former MPs, the National and ACT parties renewed their calls for Mallard to be removed as Speaker of the House. Mallard resigns in August to take up a diplomatic post in Europe.
- March: Green Party MP Elizabeth Kerekere resigns from her position as the Green Party spokesperson for Health and acting spokesperson for COVID-19 Response, after she breaks COVID-19 isolation rules by flying from Gisborne to Wellington despite being a household contact for COVID-19. She is also temporarily removed from her position on the Health Select Committee.

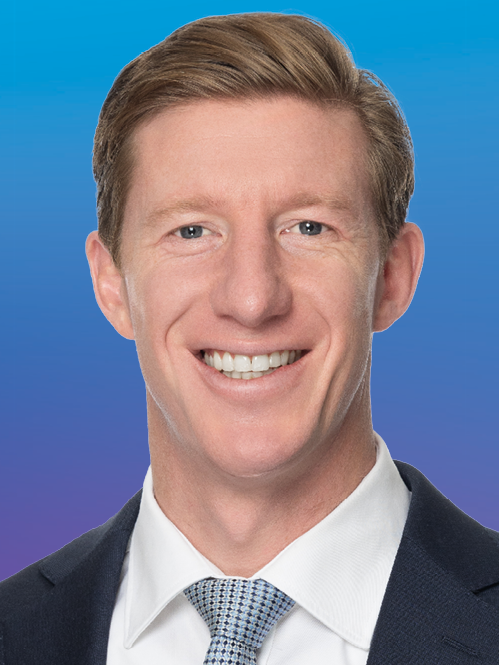
National Party MP Sam Uffindell had historically bullied others.

- August:
  - Historic bullying events surrounding National Party MP Sam Uffindell come to light. These events relate to when Uffindell was 16 years old and led to his expulsion from King's College. Having offered the victim an apology in 2021, he stood for parliament at the 2022 Tauranga by-election and declared the incident to the National Party selection committee. Another bullying allegation was made against Uffindell by a former flatmate regarding an interaction in 2003 when Uffindell was 20 years old. Subsequently Uffindell was stood down from the National caucus pending an investigation. The investigation found that the allegations could not be substantiated and Uffindell was reinstated into the caucus.
  - Labour Party MP Gaurav Sharma makes several public accusations of bullying in parliament by his own party, their whips and Parliamentary Services. Sharma's accusations were disputed by Labour and Parliamentary Services. Counter-claims were made by former staffers of Sharma, who alleged that Sharma had in fact bullied them. Sharma was suspended and later expelled from the Labour caucus.
- October: National Party MP Barbara Kuriger resigned her portfolios of Agriculture, Biosecurity and Food Safety due to a conflict of interest over her son being charged with animal cruelty. In December, it was revealed that Kuriger had extensively used her parliamentary email to email MPI.

==== 2023 ====
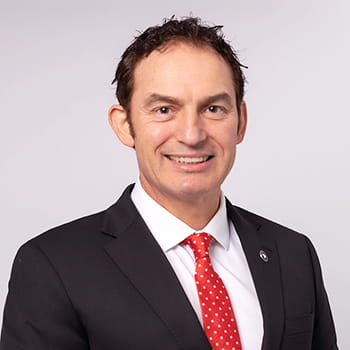
Labour Party Minister Stuart Nash was embroiled in multiple ministerial indiscretions.

- March: Labour Party MP Stuart Nash resigns as Minister of Police following revelations he asked Police Commissioner Andrew Coster to appeal a decision Nash felt was too light, a breach of the expectation that the Government remains neutral regarding operational Police matters. Shortly after, revelations came to light that the Attorney-General had earlier reprimanded Nash for making remarks during a 2020 Newstalk ZB interview calling for murder suspect Eli Epiha to be imprisoned for his actions during the murder of Matthew Hunt. At the time, Epiha was facing trial and had not yet been convicted for murdering Hunt. Nash subsequently admitted to a third incident of misconduct where he contacted the Ministry of Business, Innovation and Employment to advocate for a migrant health professional in Napier in September 2022. Later it was revealed that in 2020, Nash emailed two of his donors about a commercial rent relief policy Cabinet was discussing. The disclosure of this information was a breach of the Cabinet Manual, part of New Zealand's unwritten constitution. Nash was subsequently stripped of his ministerial portfolios. A Cabinet Office report cleared Nash of confidentiality breaches but identified a conflict of interest in the government appointment of a donor and high school friend Phil McCaw, who had donated towards Nash's 2020 election campaign. The Chief Ombudsman found that Nash had breached the Official Information Act by improperly withholding emails in which he discussed confidential Cabinet briefings with two donors during the COVID-19 pandemic in June 2020.
- April: Green Party MP Elizabeth Kerekere resigns from the party following allegations that she bullied other Green Party MPs, staff and volunteers.

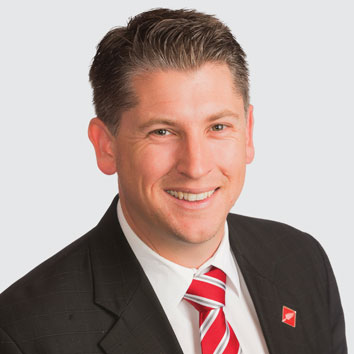
Labour Party MP Michael Wood failed to properly disclose shares that he owned.

- June: The Michael Wood shares debacle: Labour MP Michael Wood fails to meet an obligation to declare financial interests that are in conflict with his ministerial responsibilities. Though he had declared his shares in Auckland Airport to the Cabinet Office when he became Minister of Transport in 2020, he failed to declare them in the public register of MPs' assets and other interests until 2022. The Registrar of Pecuniary and Other Specified Interests launched an inquiry. Their report was critical of Wood for having failed to manage his conflicts as a minister, including "a lack of awareness of the need to correct errors and omissions" and to do so in a timely way, and for tarnishing the reputation of Parliament. Wood was referred to Parliament's Privileges Committee. Before the inquiry could be completed, however, Wood resigned as a minister, after revelations that additional shares he owned in Chorus, Spark and National Australia Bank had not been disclosed. The Privileges Committee found he was neglectful in his "duties over a significant period of time", but his "shortcomings in this regard" were not enough to amount to contempt.

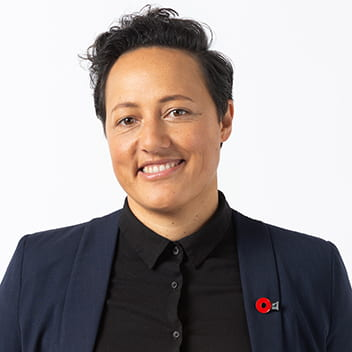
Labour Party and Justice Minister Kiri Allan is charged by Police for careless use of a motor vehicle.

- July:
  - Labour MP and Justice Minister Kiri Allan is charged with careless use of a vehicle and refusing to accompany a police officer following a car crash. She resigned from Cabinet after the crash, having also tested at an infringement level on an alcohol breath test. Allan originally pleaded not guilty to the charges, however, just before facing a judge-alone trial at Wellington District Court on 22 May 2024 she pleaded guilty and was sentenced on the spot, convicted and fined.
  - Mayor of Wellington Tory Whanau attracts media attention after she enters a bar seemingly intoxicated and leaves without paying her bill. Restaurant staff had earlier refused to serve her due to her state. Whanau admitted not paying her bill and being "tipsy" but denied that she had acted confrontationally towards staff members, including asking if they knew who she was. The bill was subsequently paid. In November Whanau is once again seemingly intoxicated at a Wellington bar. Two weeks later, she releases a written statement, admitting a drinking problem and that she is seeking professional help.
  - National MP Tim van de Molen was referred to Privileges Committee, and censured the following August for "threatening behaviour" towards other colleagues.
- September: Labour Party MP Shanan Halbert faces bullying accusations by multiple employees. The Labour Party had been alerted to concerns about his alleged behaviour a year before the accusations came to light, but because staffers wanted to remain anonymous, no formal process was undertaken.

==== 2024 ====
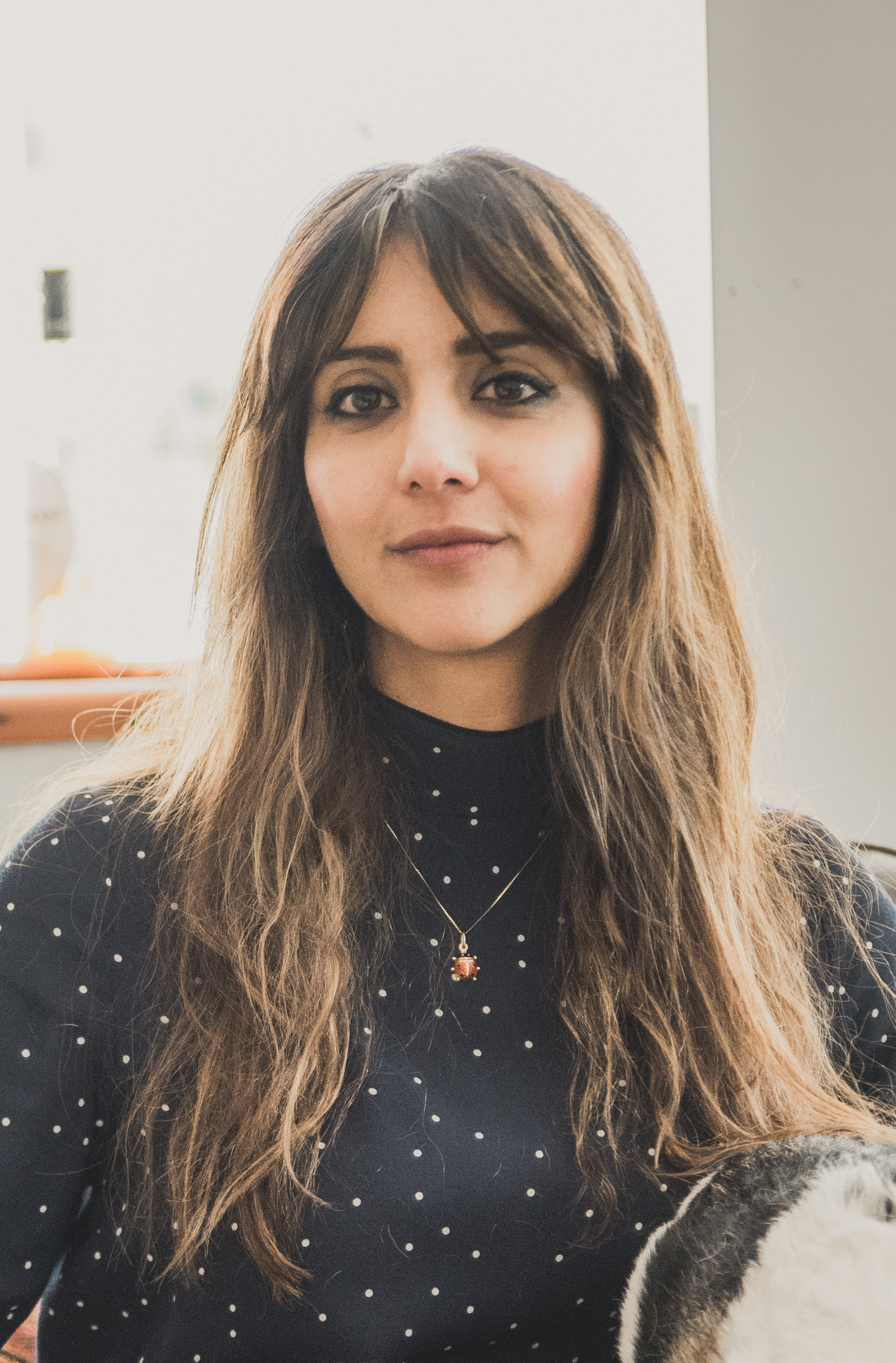
Green Party MP and Justice Spokesperson, Golriz Ghahraman pleaded guilty to shoplifting.

- January: Green Party MP and justice spokesperson Golriz Ghahraman is charged by police with three counts of shoplifting. These charges include stealing clothing items from a Wellington store in October 2023 and from a luxury fashion Auckland store on two different occasions in December. The total value of goods amounted to around $10,000. Ghahraman subsequently resigned from parliament. Police later reveal they are laying an additional, fourth charge against Ghahraman for stealing items from another store in Newmarket, Auckland. Golriz later pleads guilty to all four charges and the details of her offending are released. On 27 June 2024, she was convicted and fined $1600 and court costs of $260, and denied a discharge without conviction
- February: The Ministry of Health admits failings in handling contracts it awarded to firm with links to Labour Party MP and former cabinet minister Peeni Henare.
- March: Green Party MP Darleen Tana is suspended from her portfolios including spokesperson for small business amid allegations she is linked to migrant exploitation at her husband’s company, E Cycles NZ. The company has a history of Employment Relation Authority complaints and they are alleged to own tens of thousands of unpaid wages to former employees. In May the MP finds herself in more hot water after it is found that she placed an advertisement in Verve magazine that does not comply with electoral laws. The matter was referred to the Electoral Commission.

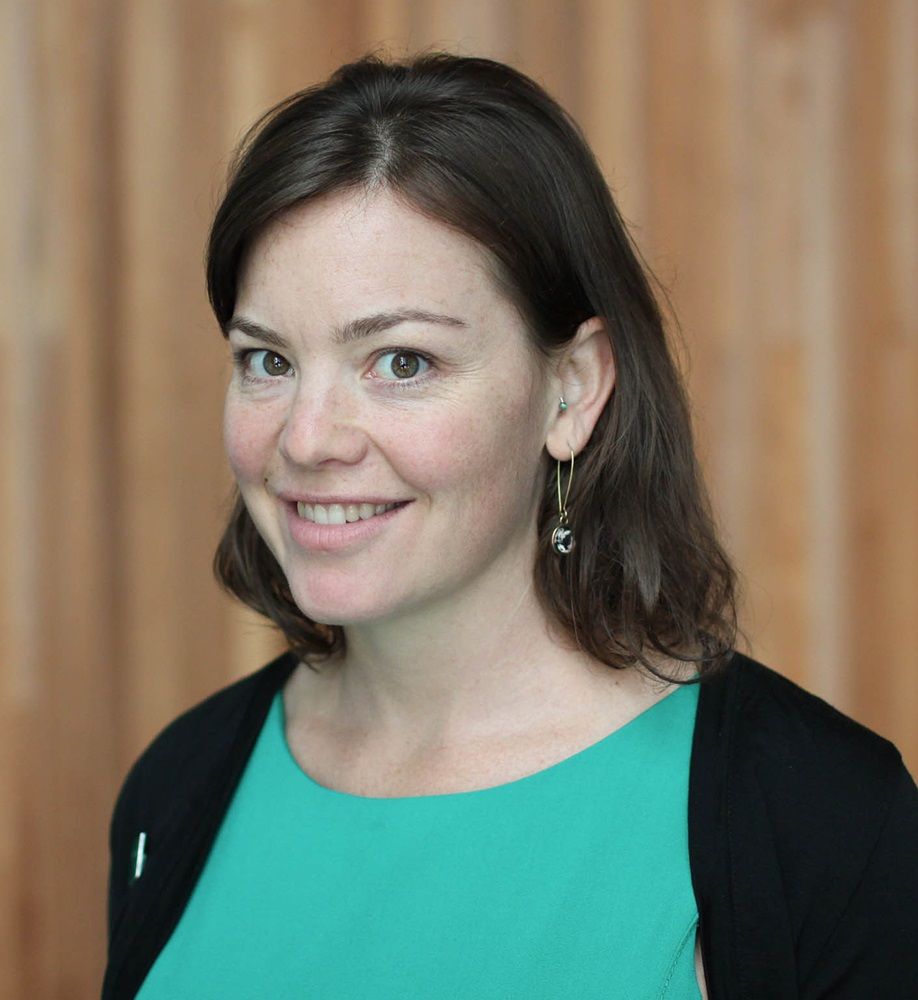
In May 2024 Green Party MP Julie Anne Genter faced disciplinary action after crossing the floor to intimidate a minister.

- May:
  - Green Party MP Julie Anne Genter is referred to the Privileges Committee following multiple complaints about her intimidating behaviour in the House against National Party Minister Matt Doocey, during the Annual Review – Transport. In the following days, two Wellington small business owners come forward to publicise previous interactions they had had with Genter. One of the women claimed the MP grabbed her in a heated exchange that left her frightened and worried. The other woman claimed Genter entered her shop and behaved in an intimidating manner, pulling out her phone and filming the businesswoman over differing views on cycle plans. A Wellington Councillor also alleges a similar incident of inappropriate behaviour from five years earlier.
  - National MP David MacLeod is stood down after failing to declare $178,000 in donations.
  - The Speaker is forced to address Green MP Ricardo Menendez March's use of swear words in the House after March shouted over a speech by a Labour MP. The Hansard, Parliament's online transcription archive, records only two previous mentions of the f-word, both times by former Green MP Sue Bradford who was quoting another person.
- July: Trade Minister Todd McClay told another member of parliament, Ricardo Menéndez March, that "you're not in Mexico now, we don't do things like that here." McClay apologised for the comment.

== See also ==
- List of New Zealand Police controversies
- List of Australian political controversies

== Notes ==
- As of this edit, this article uses content from "List of political scandals in New Zealand", authored by https://en.wikipedia.org/w/index.php?title=List_of_political_scandals_in_New_Zealand&action=history, which is licensed in a way that permits reuse under the Creative Commons Attribution-ShareAlike 4.0 International License, but not under the GFDL. All relevant terms must be followed.
