= First National Government of New Zealand =

Government of New Zealand, 1949–1957

First National Government
- Ministries of New Zealand
- 1949–1957
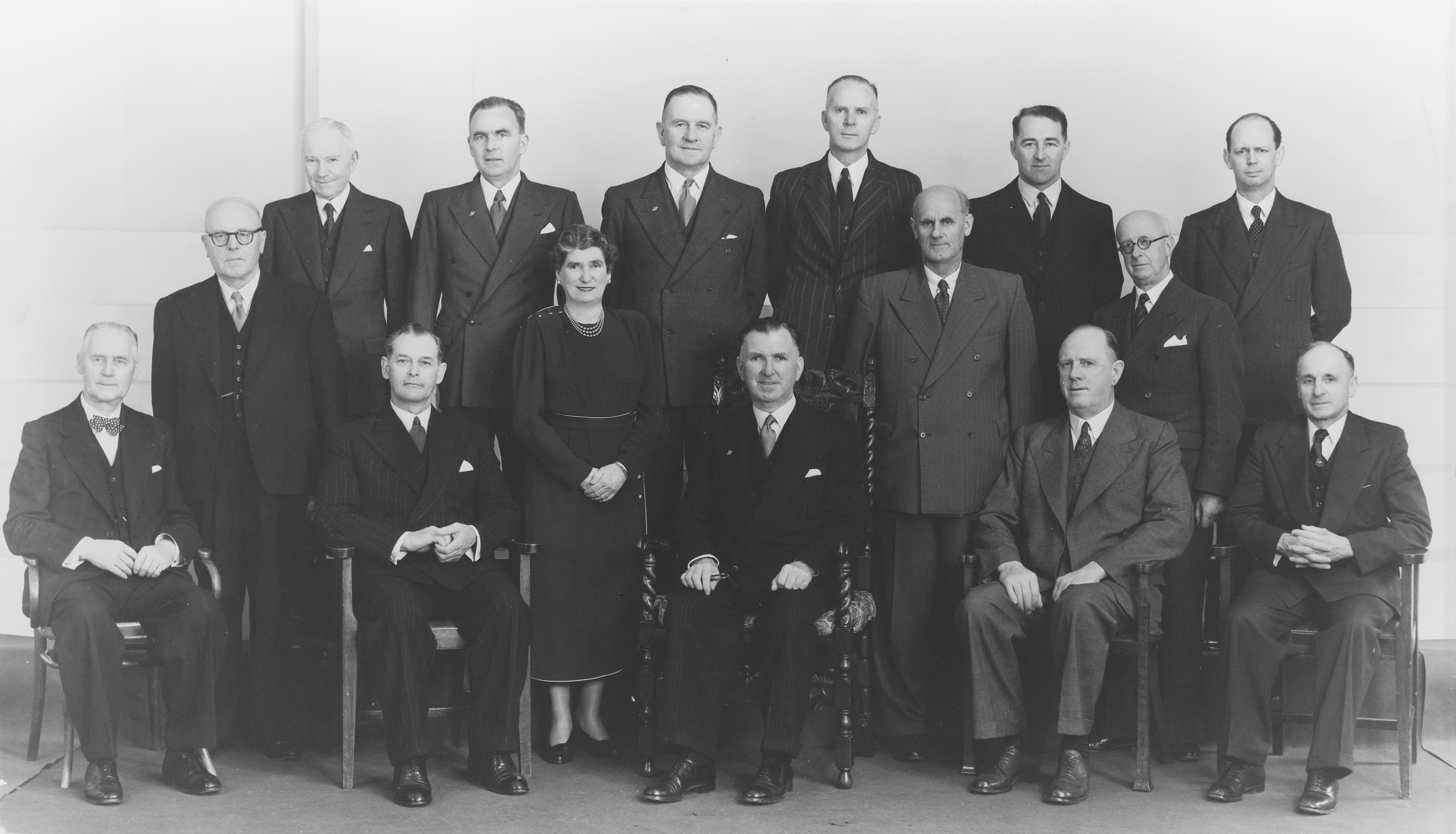
- Date formed: 13 December 1949
- Date dissolved: 12 December 1957

People and organisations
- Monarch: George VI; Elizabeth II
- Prime Minister: Sidney Holland (1949–57); Keith Holyoake (1957)
- Deputy Prime Minister: Keith Holyoake (1954–57); Jack Marshall (1957)
- Member party: National Party
- Status in legislature: Majority
- Opposition party: Labour Party
- Opposition leader: Peter Fraser (1949–1950); Walter Nash (1950–1957)

History
- Elections: 1949 general election 1951 general election 1954 general election
- Predecessor: First Labour Government of New Zealand
- Successor: Second Labour Government of New Zealand

The First National Government of New Zealand governed New Zealand from 1949 to 1957 formed by the National Party. It was a conservative government best remembered for its role in the 1951 waterfront dispute. It also began the repositioning of New Zealand in the Cold War environment. Although New Zealand continued to assist Britain in situations such as the Malayan Emergency, it now became connected to Australia and the United States through the ANZUS agreement.

Domestically, the First National Government presided over a steady rise in the average standard of living, and by 1957 New Zealand was, in the words of the historian Keith Sinclair, "a materialist's paradise". In 1957, the National Party published a book entitled A Record of Achievement: The Work of the National Government, 1949–1957, detailing its accomplishments in office. Under National's leadership, according to the publication, people now had more money, pensions, cattle, sheep, university scholarships, overseas trips, radios, washing machines, vacuum cleaners, electric toasters, houses, motor vehicles, and telephones. As summed up by Sidney Holland in a foreword, 'New Zealand is a happier, healthier and more prosperous nation'.

== Significant policies ==
=== Constitutional ===
- Abolished the Legislative Council (Upper House), thus making New Zealand's parliament unicameral; see Suicide squad.
- Established the position of Deputy Prime Minister.

=== Industrial ===
- Took the side of employers in the 1951 waterfront dispute

=== Economic ===
- Post-war rationing and price controls on property abolished.
- Producer-controlled export boards created.
- Set up PAYE income tax.
- Formed a partnership with Fletcher Construction to build a pulp and paper mill at Kawerau.

=== Foreign affairs and military ===
This period marked a shift in New Zealand's foreign policy. Before World War II New Zealand lacked an independent foreign policy, instead opting to simply follow and support Britain. New Zealand's participation in World War II was part of this – Prime Minister Michael Joseph Savage had declared that 'where Britain goes we go', and New Zealand troops had fought almost exclusively in Europe rather than in the Pacific, where Japanese forces threatened New Zealand. At the start of the war it had been assumed that the Royal Navy would protect New Zealand, but the Fall of Singapore showed this to be a false assumption. New Zealand turned to the United States for protection. The beginning of the Cold War, and communist successes in China made many New Zealanders feel in need of this protection. New Zealand therefore entered the ANZUS pact with Australia and the United States, each pledging to defend the others if they were attacked. Fear of the communist threat from Asia also motivated the introduction of compulsory military training and New Zealand's participation in the Korean War and the Malayan Emergency. However, there was still considerable support for Britain, which led to New Zealand giving Britain moral support (but no practical help) during the Suez Crisis.

=== Social policy ===
The government maintained the welfare state created by the previous, Labour, government due to its popularity with voters. However some modifications were made, such as allowing state housing tenants to purchase their homes and enabling families to capitalise their family benefits to buy a house. In 1950, the suspensory loan was introduced, a subsidy towards the construction of a home which was repayable if the house was sold within seven years.

The Lead Process Regulations, issued the same year, were aimed at safeguarding factory workers "whose work brings them into contact in any way with lead or compounds containing over a specified proportion of lead." In 1952, the Social Security Department was authorised by the government to operate a home help service for (as noted by one study) “social security beneficiaries and others in need, who could not care for themselves adequately.”

A year later, universal superannuation was doubled, and a noncontributory social assistance scheme for the underprivileged was introduced. In 1954, widows' benefit was extended to deserted wives after divorce in some cases.

== Formation ==
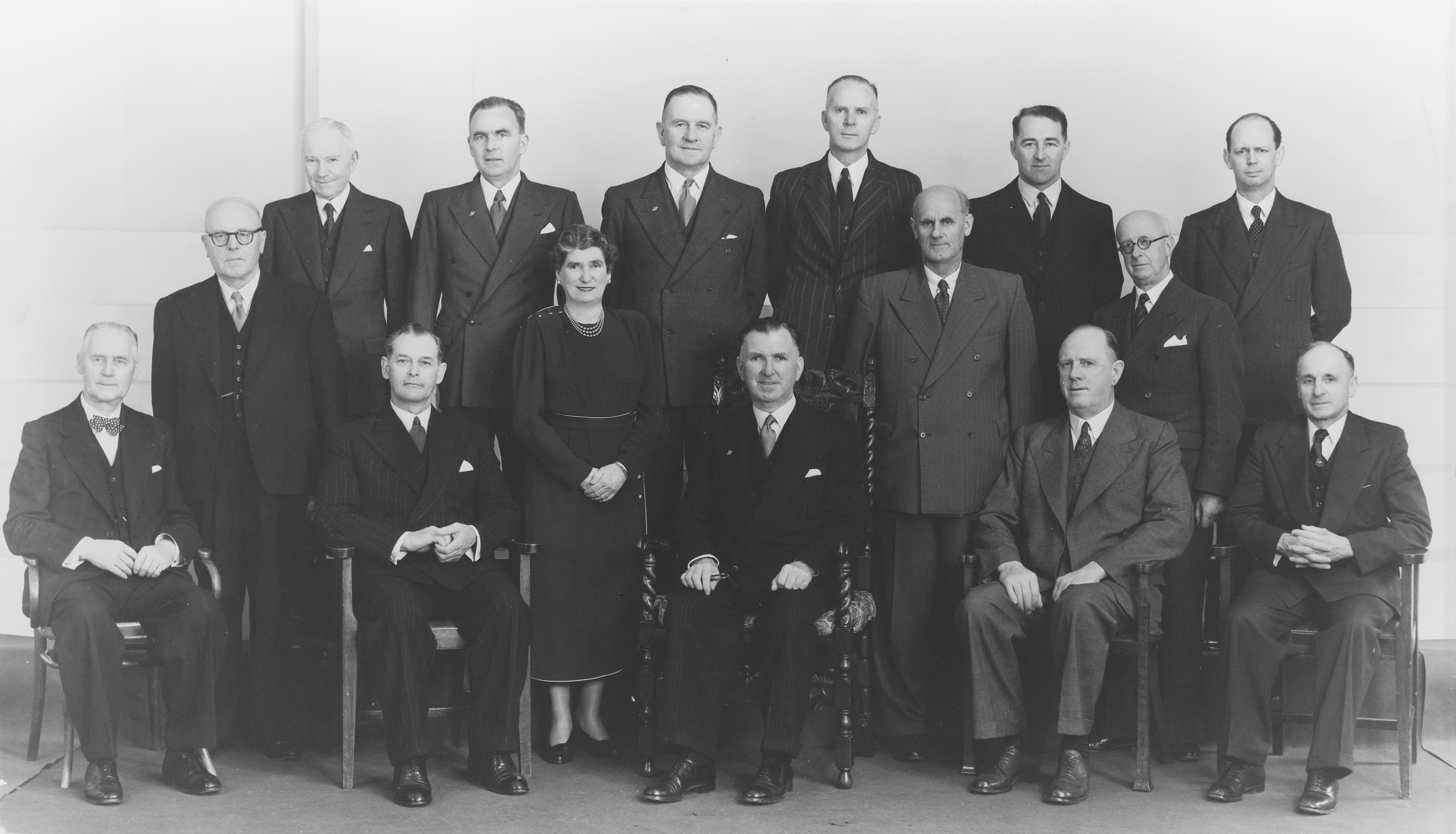
The Prime Minister and his cabinet in 1951

The National Party was formed in 1936, after the Labour Party took office for the first time, displacing the Liberal-Reform coalition. The Liberal and Reform parties (along with the Country Party) officially merged into the National Party, initially basing themselves on opposition to Labour and its welfare state policies. However the popularity of these policies soon became evident, and National began to moderate its opposition, promising that it would not abolish the welfare system Labour had enacted.

By 1949, Labour had been in power for 14 years. Labour's interventionist ethos combined with the economic restrictions caused by World War II meant that the economy was highly regulated and consumer choice limited. National campaigned on the promise that it would keep the overall structure of Labour's welfare state while moderating it to reduce the power of trade unions, increase consumer choice and generally abolish unnecessary regulation. On a relatively small swing, National gained eight seats and became the government for the first time.

== The 1951 election ==
This was a snap election called after the 1951 waterfront dispute. The dispute was an industrial conflict between the dockworkers' (watersiders') union and the Waterfront Industry Commission, representing employers. Union members had refused to do overtime and had been locked out of the wharves. The dispute lasted from February to July – 151 days. During this time the army was brought in to work the wharves. Prime Minister Sidney Holland argued that militant unions should not be allowed to disrupt the shipping of New Zealand's vital agricultural exports, and the government enacted a range of drastic measures aimed at crushing the union. It was illegal to publish anything in support of the union, or to provide food or other support for the watersiders. The Labour opposition equivocated on the issue, with leader Walter Nash annoying both sides by saying he was 'neither for nor against' the watersiders. The 1951 election was called to provide the government with a mandate for its actions during the strike. This was a successful move, as the government was returned with an increased majority.

== The 1954 election ==
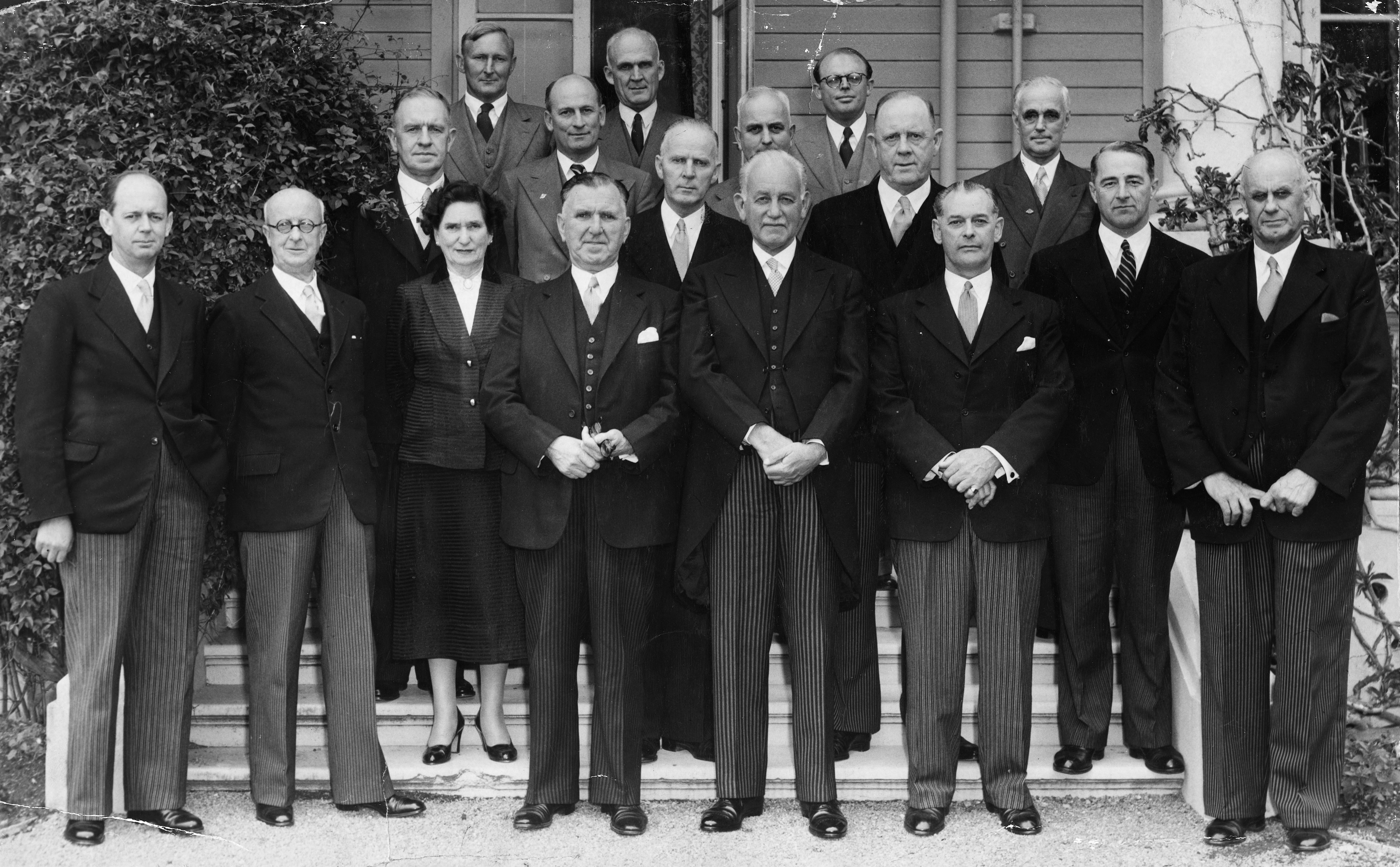
1954 Cabinet with the Governor-General

Although National's share of the vote declined significantly from its 1951 levels, it was able to retain its hold on government. This was primarily because both it and Labour had lost votes to the new Social Credit party. With the economy booming, National campaigned on a platform of 'steady as she goes' – simply maintaining the status quo.

== Defeat ==
The major issue in this election was the introduction of PAYE (pay as you earn) income tax. Although both parties were committed to the introduction of the system, they differed in terms of how the changeover from the previous system would be managed. National proposed a complicated rebate system while Labour simply promised a £100 rebate for all taxpayers on the commencement of the new system. Although denounced by National as a bribe, Labour's proposal was the more popular. In addition, National was suffering from leadership problems. Holland had been in ill health since 1954, and his health took a turn for the worse in 1956. He appeared old and frail, even compared to Labour leader Walter Nash, who was actually eleven years older. In 1957, Holland was persuaded to step down from the leadership in favour of his deputy, Keith Holyoake. The transition occurred too close to the election, and Holyoake had little time to establish his leadership. Labour was able to win 4% more of the vote than National, and a slender two seat majority.

== Election results ==
Election	Parliament	Seats	Total votes	Percentage	Gain (loss)	Seats won	Change	Majority
1949	29th	80	1,073,154	51.9%	+3.5%	46	+8	12
1951	30th	80	1,069,791	53.99%	+2%	50	+4	20
1954	31st	80	1,096,839	44.3%	-9.69%	45	-5	10
1957	32nd	80	1,257,365	44.2%	-0.1%	39	-6	-

== Prime ministers ==
Sidney Holland was the prime minister for most of the government's term, from 13 December 1949. On 20 September 1957 – less than three months before the election – he stepped down in favour of Keith Holyoake, who was only prime minister to 12 December 1957.

Prime Ministers of the First National Government

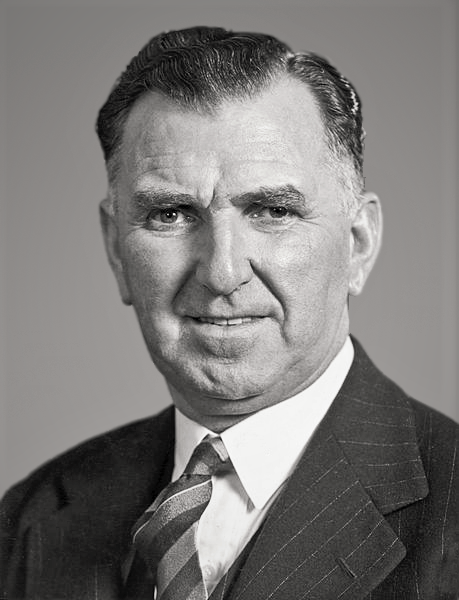
Sidney Holland
served 1949-1957

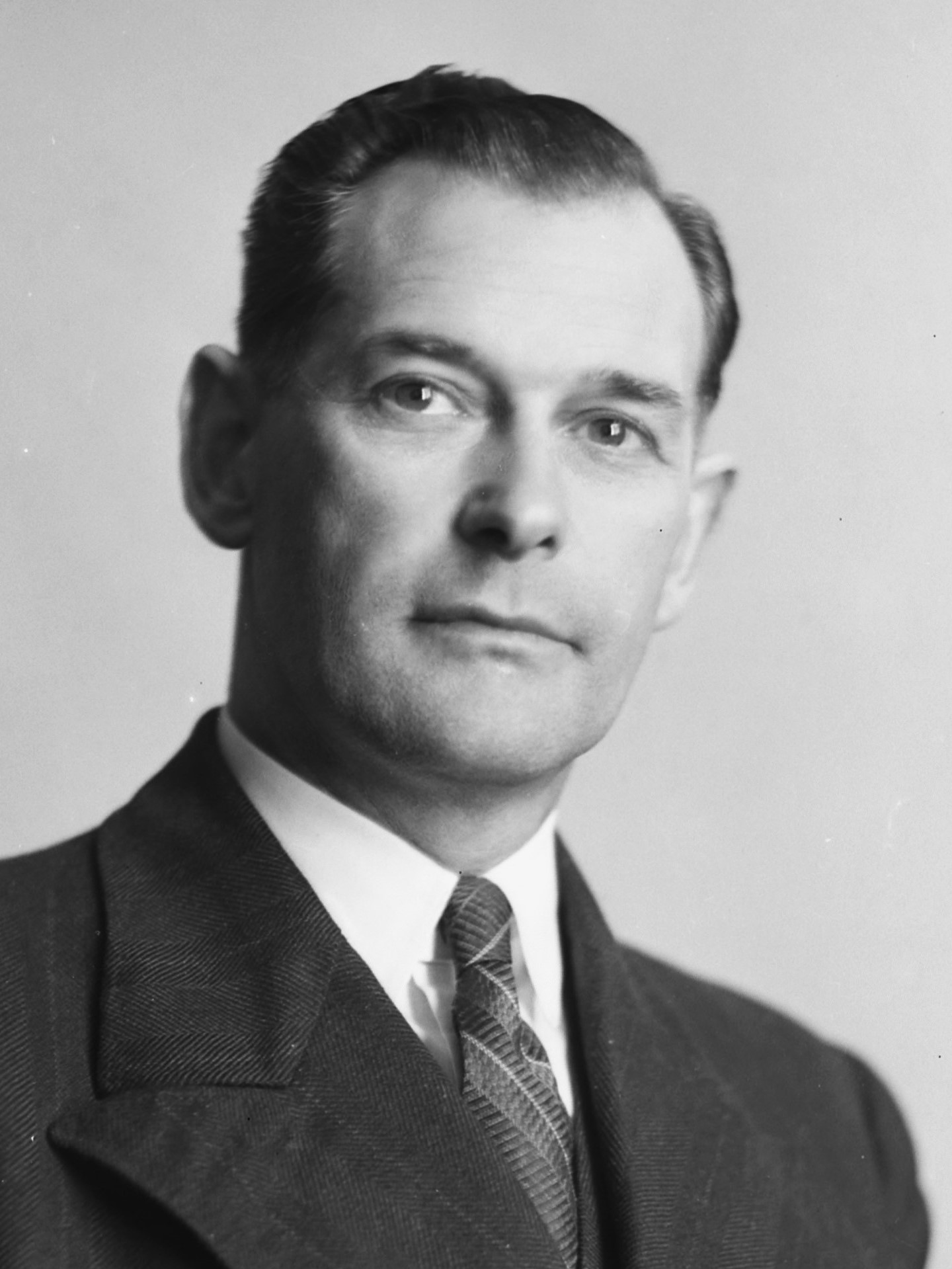
Keith Holyoake
served 1957

== Cabinet Ministers ==
Portfolio	Minister	Start	End
Prime Minister	Sidney Holland	13 December 1949	20 September 1957
Prime Minister	Keith Holyoake	20 September 1957	12 December 1957
Deputy Prime Minister	Keith Holyoake	13 December 1949	20 September 1957
Deputy Prime Minister	Jack Marshall	20 September 1957	12 December 1957
Minister of Agriculture	Keith Holyoake	13 December 1949	26 September 1957
Minister of Agriculture	Sidney Walter Smith	26 September 1957	12 December 1957
Attorney-General	Clifton Webb	13 December 1949	26 November 1954
Attorney-General	Jack Marshall	26 November 1954	12 December 1957
Minister of Customs	Charles Bowden	13 December 1949	26 November 1954
Minister of Customs	Dean Eyre	26 November 1954	23 March 1956
Minister of Customs	Eric Halstead	23 March 1956	12 December 1957
Minister of Defence	Tom Macdonald	13 December 1949	26 September 1957
Minister of Defence	Dean Eyre	26 September 1957	12 December 1957
Minister of Education	Ronald Algie	13 December 1949	12 December 1957
Minister of Finance	Sidney Holland	13 December 1949	26 November 1954
Minister of Finance	Jack Watts	26 November 1954	12 December 1957
Minister of Foreign Affairs	Frederick Doidge	13 December 1949	19 September 1951
Minister of Foreign Affairs	Clifton Webb	19 September 1951	26 November 1954
Minister of Foreign Affairs	Tom Macdonald	26 November 1954	12 December 1957
Minister of Forestry	Ernest Corbett	13 December 1949	26 November 1954
Minister of Forestry	Sidney Walter Smith	26 November 1954	26 September 1957
Minister of Forestry	Geoff Gerard	26 September 1957	12 December 1957
Minister of Health	Jack Watts	13 December 1949	19 September 1951
Minister of Health	Jack Marshall	19 September 1951	26 November 1954
Minister of Health	Ralph Hanan	26 November 1954	12 December 1957
Minister of Immigration	Bill Sullivan	13 December 1949	26 November 1954
Minister of Immigration	Ralph Hanan	26 November 1954	12 December 1957
Minister of Industries and Commerce	Charles Bowden	13 December 1949	19 December 1950
Minister of Industries and Commerce	Jack Watts	19 December 1950	26 November 1954
Minister of Industries and Commerce	Dean Eyre	26 November 1954	23 March 1956
Minister of Industries and Commerce	Eric Halstead	23 March 1956	12 December 1957
Minister of Internal Affairs	William Bodkin	13 December 1949	26 November 1954
Minister of Internal Affairs	Sidney Walter Smith	26 November 1954	12 December 1957
Minister of Island Territories	Frederick Doidge	13 December 1949	19 September 1951
Minister of Island Territories	Clifton Webb	19 September 1951	26 November 1954
Minister of Island Territories	Tom Macdonald	26 November 1954	12 December 1957
Minister of Justice	Clifton Webb	13 December 1949	26 November 1954
Minister of Justice	Jack Marshall	26 November 1954	12 December 1957
Minister of Labour	Bill Sullivan	13 December 1949	13 February 1957
Minister of Labour	John McAlpine	13 February 1957	12 December 1957
Minister of Maori Affairs	Ernest Corbett	13 December 1949	26 September 1957
Minister of Maori Affairs	Keith Holyoake	26 September 1957	12 December 1957
Minister of Marine	Stan Goosman	13 December 1949	26 November 1954
Minister of Marine	John McAlpine	26 November 1954	13 February 1957
Minister of Marine	Geoff Gerard	13 February 1957	12 December 1957
Minister of Mines	Bill Sullivan	13 December 1949	13 February 1957
Minister of Mines	John McAlpine	13 February 1957	12 December 1957
Minister of Police	Sidney Holland	13 December 1949	18 January 1950
Minister of Police	Wilfred Fortune	18 January 1950	26 November 1954
Minister of Police	Sidney Holland	26 November 1954	7 December 1956
Minister of Police	Dean Eyre	7 December 1956	12 December 1957
Postmaster-General	Walter Broadfoot	13 December 1949	26 November 1954
Postmaster-General	Tom Shand	26 November 1954	12 December 1957
Minister of Railways	Stan Goosman	13 December 1949	26 November 1954
Minister of Railways	John McAlpine	26 November 1954	12 December 1957
Minister of Revenue	Charles Bowden	13 December 1949	26 November 1954
Minister of Revenue	Jack Watts	26 November 1954	12 December 1957
Minister for Social Security	Jack Watts	13 December 1949	19 December 1950
Minister for Social Security	William Bodkin	19 December 1950	26 November 1954
Minister for Social Security	Eric Halstead	26 November 1954	23 March 1956
Minister for Social Security	Dean Eyre	23 March 1956	13 February 1957
Minister for Social Security	Geoff Gerard	13 February 1957	26 September 1957
Minister for Social Security	Hilda Ross	26 September 1957	12 December 1957
Minister of Transport	Stan Goosman	13 December 1949	12 December 1957
Minister of Works	Stan Goosman	13 December 1949	12 December 1957

== See also ==
- List of New Zealand governments
- New Zealand National Party
