= 32nd New Zealand Parliament =

Term of the Parliament of New Zealand

32nd Parliament of New Zealand
←	31st Parliament	33rd Parliament	→
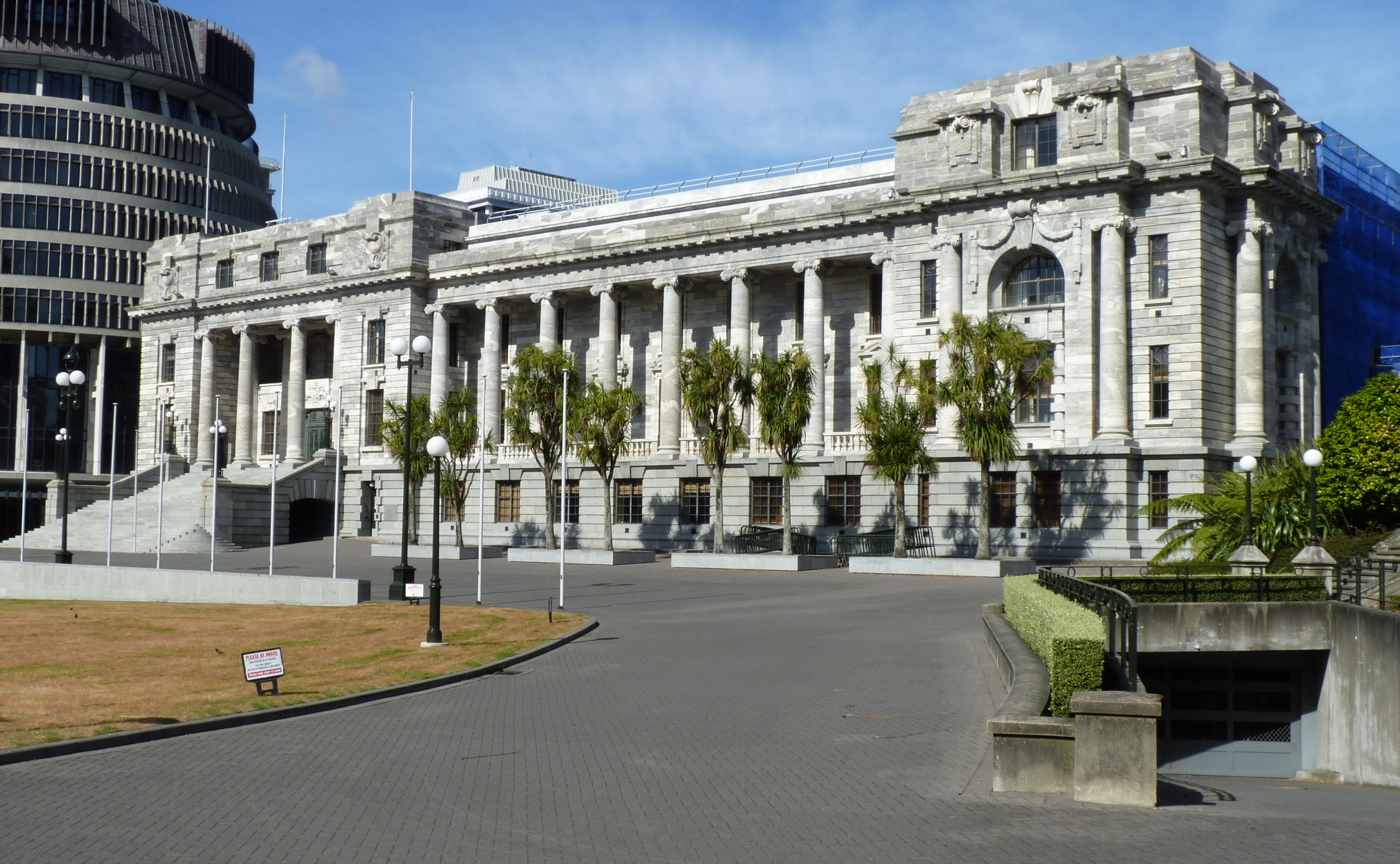
- Parliament House, Wellington

Overview
- Legislative body: New Zealand Parliament
- Term: 21 January 1958 – 28 October 1960
- Election: 1957 New Zealand general election
- Government: Second Labour Government

House of Representatives
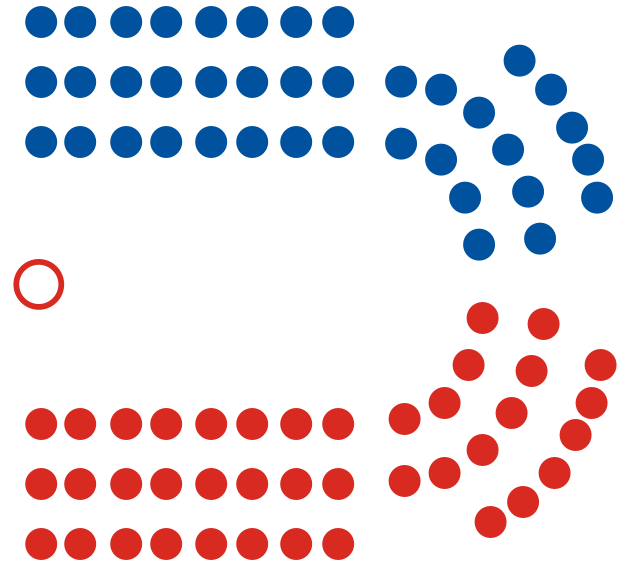
- Members: 80
- Speaker of the House: Robert Macfarlane
- Prime Minister: Walter Nash
- Leader of the Opposition: Keith Holyoake

Sovereign
- Monarch: HM Elizabeth II
- Governor-General: HE The Viscount Cobham

The 32nd New Zealand Parliament was a term of the New Zealand Parliament. It was elected at the 1957 general election on 30 November of that year.

== 1957 general election ==
The 1957 general election was held on Saturday, 30 November. A total of 80 MPs were elected; 51 represented North Island electorates, 25 represented South Island electorates, and the remaining four represented Māori electorates; this was a gain of one electorate for the North Island from the South Island since the 1954 election. 1,252,329 voters were enrolled and the official turnout at the election was 92.9%.

== Sessions ==
The 32nd Parliament sat for four sessions (there were two sessions in 1958), and was prorogued on 28 October 1960.

Session	Opened	Adjourned
first	21 January 1958	31 January 1958
second	10 June 1958	3 October 1958
third	24 June 1959	23 October 1959
fourth	22 June 1960	28 October 1960

== Ministries ==
The National Party under Sidney Holland had been in power since the 1949 election as the first National Government, and Holland remained in charge until he stepped down due to ill health in September 1957 some two months prior to the 1957 election. Holland was succeeded by Keith Holyoake, but the Labour Party narrowly defeated National at the 1957 election, and the government changed in mid-December of that year. Walter Nash formed the Nash Ministry, which was in power from 12 December 1957 until the defeat of the second Labour Government at the next election in 1960.

== Overview of seats ==
The table below shows the number of MPs in each party following the 1957 election and at dissolution:

Affiliation	Members	
Affiliation	At 1957 election	At dissolution
Labour Government	41	41
National Opposition	39	39
Total	80	80
Working Government majority	2	2

Notes

- The Working Government majority is calculated as all Government MPs less all other parties.

== Initial composition of the 32nd Parliament ==
The table below shows the results of the 1957 general election:

Key

Labour National

Electorate results for the 1957 New Zealand general election.
Electorate	Incumbent	Winner	Majority	Runner up
General electorates
Ashburton	Geoff Gerard		1,769	George Glassey
Auckland Central	Bill Anderton		3,856	Aileen Joyce
Avon	John Mathison		6,100	William Ernest Olds
Awarua	George Herron	Gordon Grieve	1,636	J P Wyatt
Bay of Plenty	Percy Allen		910	Godfrey Santon
Buller	Jerry Skinner		2,677	Norman Leon Bensemann
Christchurch Central	Robert Macfarlane		4,071	Colin McLachlan
Clutha	James Roy		1,490	Joseph Fahey (Note: The previous Labour candidate, Bruce Waters, died the day before the general election, so the election in Clutha was postponed to 18 January 1958)
Dunedin Central	Phil Connolly		1,778	Marcus Anderson
Dunedin North	Ethel McMillan		3,408	George Terry
Eden	Duncan Rae		498	Ian Watkins
Egmont	Ernest Corbett	William Sheat	2,697	Clarence Robert Parker
Fendalton	Sidney Holland	Jack Watts	824	Lawrence White
Franklin	Jack Massey	Alfred E. Allen	4,241	Christopher Mountford
Gisborne	Reginald Keeling		1,182	Arthur MacPherson
Grey Lynn	Fred Hackett		5,785	Bernard Griffiths
Hamilton	Hilda Ross		1,110	Ben Waters
Hastings	Ted Keating		1,070	Arthur Henry Sivewright
Hauraki	Arthur Kinsella		1,161	Brevat William Dynes
Hawkes Bay	Cyril Harker		2,858	Leonard Thomas Fischer
Heretaunga	Phil Holloway		5,117	Allan McCready
Hobson	Sidney Smith		3,134	Colin Moyle
Hurunui	William Gillespie		1,749	Lyn Christie
Hutt	Walter Nash		4,430	Lance Adams-Schneider
Invercargill	Ralph Hanan		679	Thomas Francis Doyle
Island Bay	Arnold Nordmeyer		4,209	Saul Goldsmith
Karori	Jack Marshall		3,061	Keith Spry
Lyttelton	Harry Lake	Norman Kirk	567	Harry Lake
Manawatu	Matthew Oram	Blair Tennent	1,575	Patrick Kelliher
Manukau	Leon Götz		159	Cyril Douglas Stamp
Marlborough	Tom Shand		1,782	Roy Evans
Marsden	Don McKay		2,088	Mervyn Allan Hosking
Miramar	Bill Fox		2,077	Clevedon Costello
Mornington	Wally Hudson		2,817	Walter MacDougall
Mt Albert	Warren Freer		3,987	Geoffrey Taylor
Napier	Jim Edwards		2,413	Ray Foster
Nelson	Edgar Neale	Stan Whitehead	509	Colin Wilson Martin
New Plymouth	Ernest Aderman		657	Ron Barclay
North Shore	Dean Eyre		462	Peter Lawrence Smith
Onehunga	Hugh Watt		5,686	Donald Watson
Onslow	Henry May		2,675	Kevin O'Brien
Otago Central	Jack George		2,788	J H Rapson
Otahuhu	James Deas		3,442	Clive Haszard
Otaki	Jimmy Maher		1,122	Cyril Shamy
Pahiatua	Keith Holyoake		4,020	William Erle Rose
Palmerston North	Philip Skoglund		1,348	Bill Brown
Patea	Roy Jack		902	Benjamin R. Winchcombe
Petone	Mick Moohan		4,159	Dan Riddiford
Piako	New electorate	Stan Goosman	3,812	Alistair Walker
Ponsonby	Ritchie Macdonald		6,592	Gordon Frederick Smith
Raglan	Hallyburton Johnstone	Douglas Carter	161	Alan Baxter
Rangitikei	Norman Shelton		2,983	Stephen Malcolm Roberton
Remuera	Ronald Algie		4,766	Russell Gordon Penney
Riccarton	Mick Connelly		2,867	Deena V. Sergel
Rodney	Jack Scott		3,112	George Webber
Roskill	John Rae	Arthur Faulkner	2,117	John Rae
Rotorua	Ray Boord		2,009	Murray Linton
Selwyn	John McAlpine		1,731	Stanley Marshall Cook
St Albans	Jack Watts	Neville Pickering	501	Eric Philip Wills
St Kilda	Jim Barnes	Bill Fraser	791	Jim Barnes
Stratford	Thomas Murray		3,172	J M Deegan
Sydenham	Mabel Howard		6,450	Oliver G. Moody
Tamaki	Eric Halstead	Bob Tizard	589	Eric Halstead
Tauranga	George Walsh		3,342	Oliver Liddell
Timaru	Clyde Carr		2,954	Alfred Davey
Waikato	Geoffrey Sim		2,013	Arthur John Ingram
Waipa	Stan Goosman	Hallyburton Johnstone	1,813	Albert Clifford Tucker
Wairarapa	Bert Cooksley		1,058	Bob Wilkie
Waitakere	Rex Mason		3,682	Leonard Bradley
Waitaki	New electorate	Thomas Hayman	1,618	A G Braddock
Waitemata	Norman King		2,191	Robert Muldoon
Waitomo	David Seath		2,474	Vic Haines
Wallace	Tom Macdonald	Brian Talboys	4,319	John Reid
Wanganui	Joe Cotterill		1,419	Alice Kathleen Maclean
Wellington Central	Frank Kitts		1,685	Max Wall
Westland	Jim Kent		4,745	Fred Boustridge
Māori electorates
Eastern Maori	Tiaki Omana		4,197	Wiremu Hoete Maxwell
Northern Maori	Tapihana Paikea		4,310	Timothy James Davis
Southern Maori	Eruera Tirikatene		4,383	Thomas Stratton
Western Maori	Iriaka Rātana		5,553	Pei Te Hurinui Jones

Table footnotes:

== By-elections during 32nd Parliament ==
There was one by-election during the term of the 32nd Parliament.

Electorate and by-election		Date	Incumbent	Cause	Winner
Hamilton	1959	2 May	Dame Hilda Ross	Death	Lance Adams-Schneider
