= Labour Government of New Zealand =

Labour Government of New Zealand may refer to:

- First Labour Government of New Zealand (1935-1949)
- Second Labour Government of New Zealand (1957-1960)
- Third Labour Government of New Zealand (1972-1975)
- Fourth Labour Government of New Zealand (1984-1990)
- Fifth Labour Government of New Zealand (1999-2008)
- Sixth Labour Government of New Zealand (2017-2023)
