= List of ambassadors of New Zealand to Italy =

The ambassador from New Zealand to Italy is New Zealand's foremost diplomatic representative in the Republic of Italy and is in charge of New Zealand's diplomatic mission in Italy.

The embassy is located in Rome, Italy's capital city. New Zealand has maintained a resident ambassador in Italy since 1966. The ambassador to Italy is concurrently accredited to Albania, Bosnia and Herzegovina, Croatia, Cyprus, Greece, Kosovo, Malta, Portugal, and Slovenia.

== List of heads of mission ==
=== Ambassadors to Italy ===
- Alister McIntosh (1966–1970)
- Ian Stewart (1970–1972)

=== Chargés d'Affaires in Italy ===
- Dick Atkins (1972–1973)

=== Ambassadors to Italy ===
- Phil Holloway (1973–1976)
- Eric Halstead (1976–1980)
- Jim Weir (1980–1983)
- Gordon Parkinson (1983–1986)
- Tony Small (1986–1990)
- Peter Bennett (1990–1994)
- Judith Trotter (1994–1998)
- Peter Bennett (1998–2003)
- Julie MacKenzie (2003-2008)
- Laurie Markes (2008-2010)
- Dr Trevor Matheson (2011-2014)
- Patrick Rata (2015-2019)
- Anthony Simpson (2019-2023)
- Jacqueline Frizelle (2023- )
