= Truth (NZ) Ltd v Holloway =

- Court: Judicial Committee of the Privy Council
- Full case name: Truth (NZ) Ltd v Phillip North Holloway
- Decided: 26 July 1960
- Citation: [1961] NZLR 22 (PC)
- Transcript: PC ruling

Case history
- Prior action: [1960] NZLR 69 (CA);

Court membership
- Judges sitting: Viscount Simonds, Lord Reid, Lord Tucker, Lord Denning, Lord Morris of Borth-Y-Gest.

Keywords
- negligence

Truth (NZ) Ltd v Holloway [1961] NZLR 22 (PC) is a case of the Judicial Committee of the Privy Council on appeal from the Court of Appeal of New Zealand regarding the legal issue of defamation and free speech.

== Background ==
The weekly newspaper New Zealand Truth, in an article dated 24 March 1959, published a story about the allocation of import licences, which contained a quote by importer Harry Judd saying to a fellow importer: "see Phil and Phil will fix it" The "Phil" referred to was the Hon. Phil Holloway, the then-Minister for Industries and Commerce under Prime Minister Walter Nash during the Second Labour Government. Holloway was not happy with the innuendo that he was involved in issuing import licences in a questionable way, and sued the paper for defamation. The paper defended the matter on the basis of privilege, in publishing an article of national significance.

The High Court ruled that the paper did not have such a defence, and awarded damages of NZ£11,000.

Truth appealed to the Court of Appeal claiming they had the defence of privilege, and also that the judge had misdirected the jury.

== Held ==
The Court of Appeal upheld the judgement. The Truth subsequently unsuccessfully appealed to the Privy Council, but solely on the grounds that the judge had misdirected the jury.

Footnote: Defence Counsel here (Robin Cooke) later became Justice Cooke.
