= Eyre v New Zealand Press Assoc Ltd =

- Court: High Court of New Zealand
- Full case name: Dean Jack Eyre v New Zealand Press Association Limited
- Citation: [1968] NZLR 736

Court membership
- Judge sitting: McGregor J

Keywords
- negligence, defamation

Eyre v New Zealand Press Assoc Ltd ([1968] NZLR 736) is a cited case regarding the defamation defence of common law privilege, ie.reporting of statements made by the plaintiff.

== Background ==
In the run-up to the 1966 general election, the outgoing MP and Defence Minister, Dean Eyre, made an election speech regarding the Vietnam War.

The New Zealand Press Association subsequently printed an article on the speech, and rather than print the entire speech, just quoted selected parts of his speech, including that he "would give North Vietnam a basinful of bombs tomorrow morning if he had his way", plus a quote that "we are dealing with Oriental people. They are different from ourselves".

The Minister found these statements to be defamatory, as with regards to the "basinful of bombs" quote, it should have been qualified by the fact that he had said this regarding only military targets, and with regards to the "oriental people" quote, the article giving this quote only 3 sentences after the basin of bombs quote, gave the impression that the Minister was saying that Oriental people deserved to be bombed, when in reality, this second quote was only made at the end of the meeting.

The Minister sued the NZPA for defamation, which the NZPA defended the basis of fair reporting of a public meeting, as the Minister did make these statements at the meeting.

== Held ==
The Court held that these selected statements combined were inaccurate reporting, and so was defamation. The District Court's previous award of $15,000 damages was thus upheld.
