= Phil Holloway =

New Zealand politician

The Honourable Phil Holloway CMG
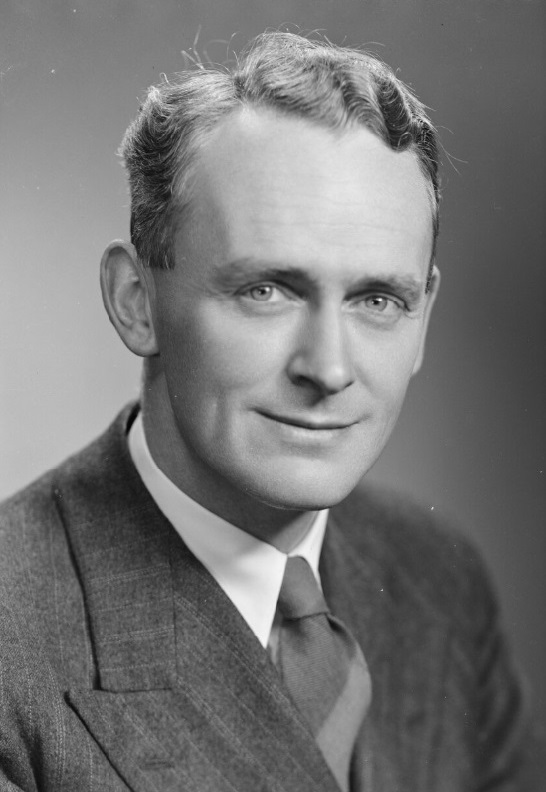

21st Minister of Industries and Commerce
- In office 12 December 1957 – 12 December 1960
- Prime Minister: Walter Nash
- Preceded by: Eric Halstead
- Succeeded by: Jack Marshall

Member of the New Zealand Parliament for Heretaunga
- In office 13 November 1954 – 12 December 1960
- Preceded by: new constituency
- Succeeded by: Ron Bailey

Personal details
- Born: 22 March 1917 Hokitika, New Zealand
- Died: 28 May 2003 (aged 86) New Zealand
- Party: Labour
- Spouse(s): Joyce Martin (m. 1946); Beverley Woolf (1963–2003)
- Children: 2, including Liddy Holloway
- Relatives: Joel Tobeck (grandson)

Military service
- Allegiance: New Zealand Army
- Years of service: 1940–45
- Rank: Second Lieutenant
- Unit: 26th Battalion
- Battles/wars: World War II

Philip North Holloway CMG (22 March 1917 – 28 May 2003) was a New Zealand politician of the Labour Party.

== Early life and career ==
Holloway was born in Hokitika in 1917. His father was an Anglican parson and he received his secondary education at Waitaki Boys' High School. He attended the University of Otago, but did not finish his degree because he went overseas in 1936. He was a door-to-door salesmen for vacuum cleaners in England before undertaking more study at Boston University. He then became a public circuit lecturer in the United States before returning to London and briefly became an assistant to prominent Labour MP Sir Stafford Cripps from 1938 to 1939. Upon returning to New Zealand he briefly worked for 2ZB. When World War II broke out, Holloway joined the army. He was a second lieutenant with the 26th Battalion, and saw service in North Africa and Italy.

Returning to New Zealand following the war he married Joyce Martin in 1946, with whom he had one daughter. From 1947 to 1950 he was an importer-distributor and was a member of the Price Tribunal. He was for a time the secretary of the Wellington Journalists Union and later employed by the Labour Party from 1953 to 1954. He was a "loyal Orangeman" and disliked the Catholic Irish.

== Political career ==
New Zealand Parliament
Years	Term	Electorate	Party
1954–1957	31st	Heretaunga	Labour
1957–1960	32nd	Heretaunga	Labour

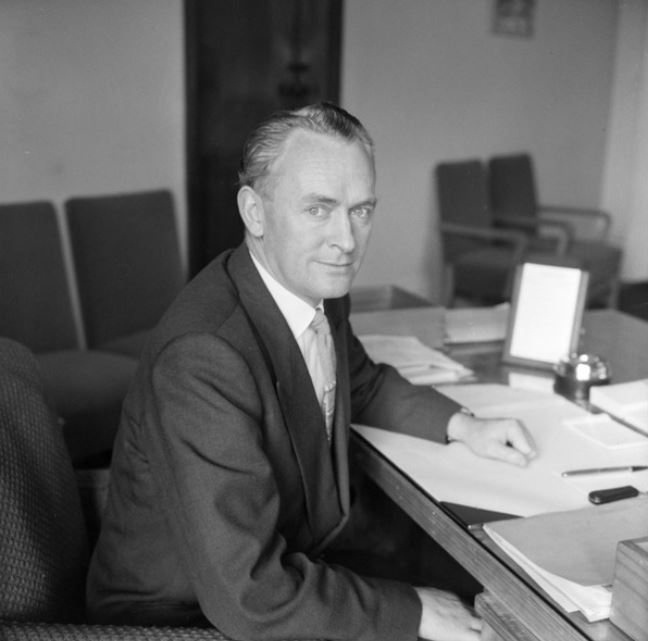
Holloway in his office, 1959

He stood in the 1946 election in the Manawatu electorate, but was defeated by the incumbent, Matthew Oram of the National Party. At the 1947 local-body elections he stood unsuccessfully for the Wellington City Council on a Labour ticket (along with all other Labour candidates). In the 1951 election, he unsuccessfully stood in the Otaki electorate.

He represented the Heretaunga electorate from 1954 to 1960, when he retired. He was both Minister of Industries and Commerce and Minister for Science and Industrial Research from 1957 to 1960 in the Second Labour Government. In that role, he was involved in the negotiations with Australia and eventually led to a free trade agreement. Holloway initiated several capital works initiatives to improve New Zealand's manufacturing capacity. He oversaw the construction of the Tiwai Point Aluminium Smelter, the Marsden Point Oil Refinery and New Zealand Steel's mill at Glenbrook. Another, a cotton mill in Nelson, was cancelled after National won the 1960 election.

Holloway had one of the largest majorities of any member of Parliament when he surprisingly decided he would not seek re-election in the 1960 election. By then he was disillusioned by politics and rationalised his unexpected departure stating there is "only so much one could do in politics".

Looming over his retirement, was the fact he had been involved in a very public stoush due to a libel case. In Truth (NZ) Ltd v Holloway, he sued the tabloid newspaper New Zealand Truth for libel after an article in its 24 March 1959 issue which featured an article "This Ex-Russian's Export Licences Should Be Investigated" which demanded an immediate government inquiry into dealings between Henry Judd, an émigré importer, and Warren Freer, Labour MP for Mt Albert. It quoted the importer as saying he had an ease-of-passage remedy for controlled imports, stating: "See Phil, and Phil will fix it", and reported that the reference was to Holloway who as Minister of Industries and Commerce was in charge of import controls. Holloway vehemently denied the suggestion and sued the paper for libel and sought £15,000 in damages. The nation was gripped by the trial which focused heavily on the derivations and meanings of the word "fix". The defence led by Robin Cooke took appeals all the way to the Privy Council in London. The court case that lasted 14 months, and eventually he was awarded £11,000 in damages and a further £800 in costs, a record sum for the times.

Holloway's early retirement also had other reasons. He wrote to Prime Minister Walter Nash early in 1960 to inform him he would not be standing again. Privately he lamented the fact that neither caucus nor party member meetings had energy or enthusiasm any more. In the letter Holloway remarked that he thought Labour's party organisation was "pathetically weak" and that the future of both the party and the government was "not bright until there is a re-assessment of our [Labour's] policy and objectives, and also a re-vitalizing of our organisation".

== Post-politics ==
In 1962, Holloway became manager of the New Zealand branch of the Chandris Shipping Lines. In 1963, after divorcing his first wife Joyce, he married Beverley Woolf with whom he would have another daughter. He remained an active member of the Labour Party and stood twice for the party presidency. He unsuccessfully challenged incumbent president Norman Douglas at both the 1967 and 1968 party conferences.

In 1973, following the election of the Third Labour Government, Holloway was appointed as Ambassador to Italy (with cross-accreditation to Yugoslavia, Egypt and Iraq) and High Commissioner to Malta from 1973 to 1976.

After his return to New Zealand, he became company director of an export company until he retired in 1989. He was a co-owner of a number of successful race horses with his friend Woolf Fisher.

In the 1987 Queen's Birthday Honours, Holloway was appointed a Companion of the Order of St Michael and St George, for public services. He was genuinely surprised with the award.

== Death ==
In early 2001 he became unwell and increasingly disabled following a series of small strokes. Holloway died on 28 May 2003. He was survived by his second wife Beverley, two daughters and one stepson from his second marriage. His funeral was attended by Labour leaders, including then Prime Minister Helen Clark.

== Family ==
One of his daughters was actor and writer Liddy Holloway and a grandson is actor Joel Tobeck.

== Notes ==
New Zealand Parliament
New constituency	Member of Parliament for Heretaunga; 1954–1960	Succeeded by Ron Bailey
Political offices
Preceded by Eric Halstead	Minister of Industries and Commerce; 1957–1960	Succeeded by Jack Marshall
Preceded by Ronald Algie	Minister for Science and Industrial Research; 1957–1960	Succeeded by Blair Tennent
Diplomatic posts
Preceded by Dick Atkins	Ambassador to Italy; 1973–1976	Succeeded by Eric Halstead
