= Second Labour Government of New Zealand =

Government of New Zealand, 1957–1960

Second Labour Government
- Ministries of New Zealand
- 1957–1960
- Date formed: 12 December 1957
- Date dissolved: 12 December 1960

People and organisations
- Monarch: Elizabeth II
- Prime Minister: Walter Nash
- Deputy Prime Minister: Jerry Skinner
- Member party: Labour Party
- Status in legislature: Majority
- Opposition party: National Party
- Opposition leader: Keith Holyoake

History
- Election: 1957 general election
- Predecessor: First National Government of New Zealand
- Successor: Second National Government of New Zealand

The Second Labour Government of New Zealand governed New Zealand from 1957 to 1960. It is remembered for raising taxes on alcohol, cigarettes and petrol, a move which was probably responsible for the government lasting for only one term. It was headed by the Prime Minister Walter Nash.

== Significant policies ==
=== Economic ===
- The Black Budget was passed which, while countering an already existing balance-of payments problem, raised taxes on alcohol, cigarettes, automobiles, and petrol.
- Industrialisation was pursued both as a means of import substitution and to develop a more mature economy. For instance, agreements were signed with overseas companies to construct an aluminium industry using cheap power from new hydroelectric projects at Lakes Te Anau and Manapouri, and a cotton mill in Nelson, which required the construction of a railway line to connect Nelson with the main South Island line; see Nelson railway proposals.
- Signed a formal agreement for Consolidated Zinc to build both an aluminium smelter at Tiwai Point and a power station in Manapouri.
- All tax-payers were given a flat-rate rebate of £100 at the commencement of the PAYE (Pay As You Earn) income tax system.
- The Companies Special Investigations Act (1958) allowed for the supervision of certain company receiverships and winding ups.
- A Technicians' Certification Authority and a Council for Technical Education were established (1958), the latter of which was meant to advise on the kind of education required for commerce and industry. By 1960, the first technical institutes began operation as full-time bodies.
- In the 1959 budget, income tax was reduced, by two stages, to about the 1957 level.
- In the 1960 budget, pensions and benefits were raised, together with state employees' salaries. The sales tax on motor vehicles, along with duties on cigarettes and petrol, were somewhat reduced. Taxes on cigarettes, petrol, beer were reduced again at the end of the year.
- By early 1960, retail turnover was at a record level, and there was an easing up on import controls.
- The Reserve Act of New Zealand Amendment Bill (1960) affirmed the sovereign right of the Crown to control credit and currency.
- Tax rates for working couples without families and for single people were lifted, with the level at which people started to pay income tax reduced from £375 to £338 for the 1958–59-year, and to £300 in subsequent years.
- By 1960, taxes had been reduced to a pre-1958 level.
- Interest rates (particularly for house-building) were reduced.
- An Industrial Development Fund was established with £11 million in foreign exchange held at the Reserve Bank for allocation to promising projects.

=== Treaty of Waitangi ===
- Declared Waitangi Day to be a 'national day of thanksgiving' through the Waitangi Day Act 1960, but did not make the day a public holiday.

=== Defence ===
- Abolished compulsory military training.

=== Social ===
- Substantial improvements were made in social security benefits during the Second Labour Government's time in office, as characterised by a 50% increase in family allowances, together with increases in other welfare benefits, universal superannuation, age benefits and other pensions. Universal superannuation was sharply increased in 1959–60 to equate it with the age benefit. According to the historian William Ball Sutch, by increasing universal superannuation to the same level as the age benefit, Labour had put “old age with family benefits and free hospitals for all into the universal group”. By increasing the superannuation rate to that of the age benefit for a married person, this meant that national superannuation, hospital attention, family benefits, drugs and medicines were now free of an income test.
- By the end of the Second Labour Government, New Zealand was spending 36% of total government expenditure on welfare programmes, which was the highest rate of any other country in the world at that time.
- As a result of the Second Labour Government’s welfare initiatives, pensions and social security payments as a percentage of the private income of the nation rose from 7% in 1957 to 8.8% by 1960.
- The value of family allowances was raised from 4.1% to 6.2% of nominal male wages (1958).
- From 1959 to 1960, the percentage of national income spent on family benefits rose from 2.7% to 3.1%, and other cash benefits from 4.5% to 5%.
- The Social Security Amendment Act (1958) removed the means test for blind beneficiaries of disability benefits. This change led to an increase in the number of blind workers in industry and in the public service.
- The Advances for Major Repairs to Homes Scheme was established (1958), with loans of up to £200 made available to war pensioners and social security beneficiaries “to enable them to carry out repairs to their home.”
- The capital (or property) test on orphans’, age, invalidity, and unemployment benefits was repealed (1960).
- The Social Security Department developed a Welfare Section (1958), staffed by trained social workers, the aim of which was to provide a personal counselling and casework service to help beneficiaries and others with personal problems in addition to the economic problems that financial benefits were intended to meet.
- The age benefit for a single person was raised to 36.9% of the nominal adult male wage index (1958).
- The Government Service Equal Pay Act was passed in 1960 to put an end to separate male and female pay scales in the public service.
- A provision for capitalisation of family benefits up to a total advance of £1000, to assist in purchasing, altering or paying off a home, was introduced. This measure, together with the introduction of 3% housing loans (which helped to speed up housing construction), greatly extended the possibilities of the not-so-wealthy purchasing a home. As a result of this legislation, thousands of families were able to purchase their own homes.
- The rate of state housing was increased.
- The potentially oppressive clauses of the Police Offences Act, passed by the First National Government following the 1951 wharf lock-out, were repealed (1960).

The property exemption for social security benefits was raised from £500 to £750 (1958).

- The Second Labour Government put an end to the promotion of state house sales, although the Second National Government reversed this decision.
- Provision was made (1958) for the advance payment of up to 52 weeks “upon the birth of the first child or upon a child beginning their first year of post-primary education.”
- Free school textbooks for secondary school pupils were introduced (1959).
- Special Assistance (a social assistance scheme for the needy introduced by the First National Government in 1951) was renamed Supplementary Assistance (1959), and the insufficiency of the benefit was officially recognised.
- A Consumer Council was established (1959) to test consumer goods and encourage quality.
- The Ruatoki Declaration, a plan for the conservation management of Urewera forests, was issued (1959), allowing some commercial return to the Māori owners.
- The first road to Maungapohatu was pushed through by Eruera Tihema Tirikatene, the Minister of Forests.
- The Post Office Act (1959) set up a Post Office Staff Tribunal with the power to make recommendations to the Postmaster-General; who determines wages, salaries, and other conditions of employment for Post Office employees.
- The Abrasive Blasting Regulations (1958) set out health and safety requirements for persons engaged in abrasive blasting operations in factories.
- The Fireguards Regulations (1958) required the proper labelling of fire extinguishers containing materials that are or may become injurious to health. They also prohibited the sale, for domestic use, of certain pressurised fire extinguishers.
- The Construction Act (1959) introduced better provisions for the safety and welfare of persons engaged on construction work. Provisions of this Act or any regulations under the Act relating to the safety of workmen employed in construction work also applied to the safety of persons lawfully in the vicinity of the work whether or not they were employed in the work. Employers had to ensure that the provisions of the Act were duly and faithfully complied with and workmen employed by employers had to comply with any instructions given to them for the purpose of securing the observance of this Act or regulations, and any person who failed to observe the provisions of the Act or any Regulation committed an offence against the Act.
- Television was introduced.
- An Arts Advisory Council was established to co-ordinate assistance to the arts.
- From 1957 to 1960, the percentage of total government expenditure on social security benefits rose from 24.2% to 30.4%.
- The Motor Vehicle Dealers Act (1958) was the first major attempt made in New Zealand “to regularise the sale of used cars by licensing dealers.”
- A national diagnostic and guidance service for pre-school deaf children and their parents was established.

== Formation ==
The main issue at the 1957 election was the introduction of PAYE income tax. Both parties had promised rebates at the change-over between the old and new systems, and Labour won favour by proposing a simple £100 rebate per taxpayer. National denounced this as a bribe, but it seems to have been popular. Another issue was that of compulsory military training. This had been introduced as a Cold War measure, but Labour now argued it was unnecessary. Labour was led by Walter Nash, who had been Finance Minister of the first Labour government. He faced National leader Keith Holyoake, who had recently taken over the Prime Ministership from Sidney Holland and had not yet settled into his role.

Labour won 48.3% of the popular vote, 4% more than National, but only two more seats. Labour won only two more seats than National (41 to 39).

== Defeat ==
Labour's biggest problem in the 1960 election was the 'Black Budget' of 1958. This negated the popularity of the tax rebate; cartoonists depicted Nash handing out money and Finance Minister Arnold Nordmeyer taking it back. In addition, Nash seemed old and out of touch compared to the much younger Holyoake, who had by this time acquired the leadership skills which would see him become one of New Zealand's longest-serving prime ministers. Nash was known to hold departmental files and procrastinate over decisions.

Although National's lead over Labour in the popular vote was the same as Labour's lead over National in 1957, it was distributed in such a way that National had a majority of 12, compared to Labour's majority of two in 1957. This was and would continue to be a perennial problem for Labour under First Past the Post – its voters tended to be concentrated in a few electorates, whereas National's were more spread out, enabling National to consistently take a disproportionate number of seats.

== Election results ==
| Election | Parliament | Seats | Total votes | Percentage | Gain (loss) | Seats won | Change | Majority |
| 1957 | 32nd | 80 | 1,257,365 | 48.3% | +4.2% | 41 | +6 | 2 |
| 1960 | 33rd | 80 | 1,170,503 | 43.4% | -4.9% | 34 | -7 | - |

== Prime ministers ==
Walter Nash was Prime Minister for the full term of this government, from 12 December 1957 to 12 December 1960.

Prime Ministers of the Second Labour Government

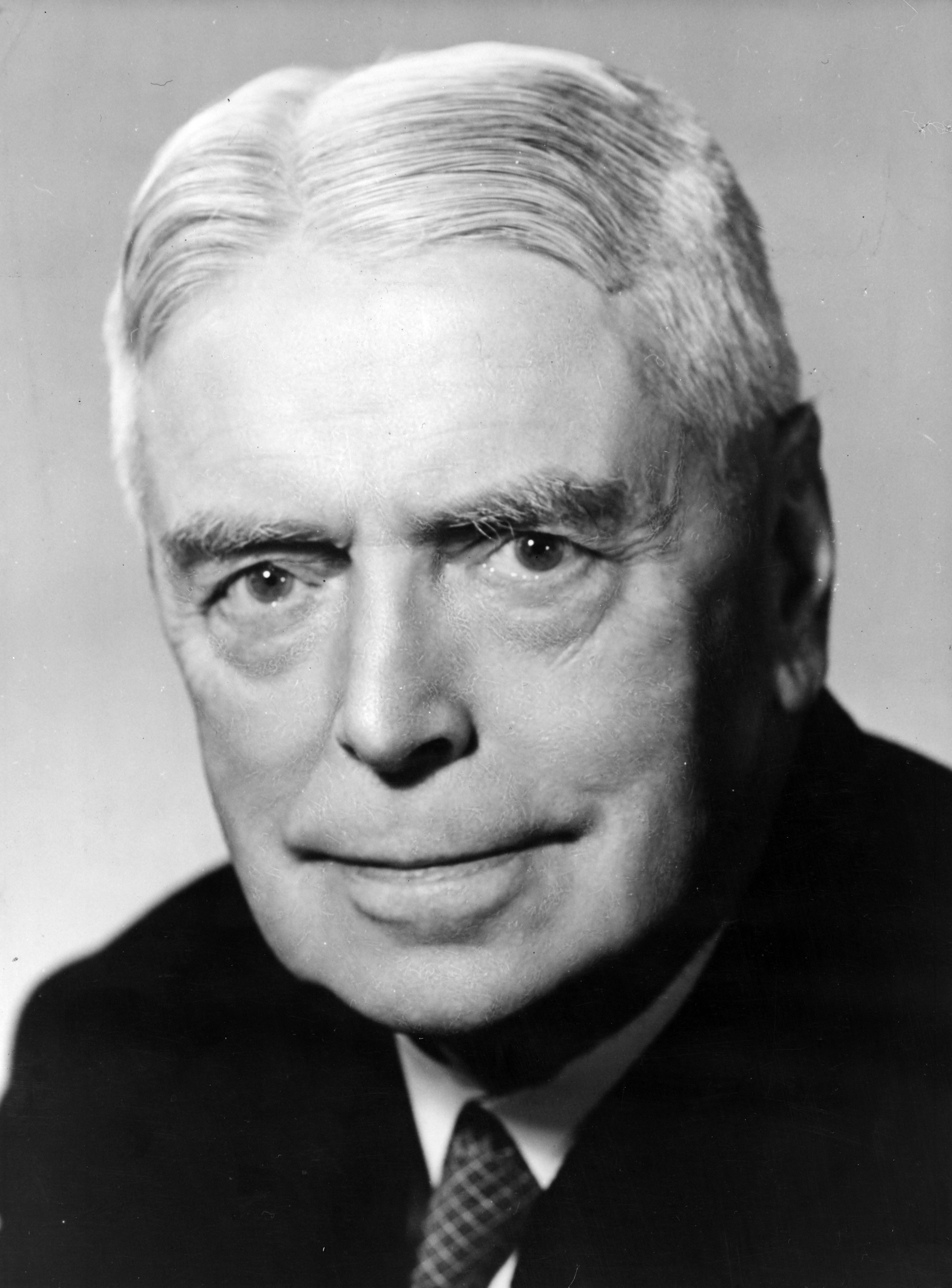
Walter Nash
served 1957-1960

== Cabinet Ministers ==
| Portfolio | Minister | Start | End |
|---|---|---|---|
| Prime Minister | Walter Nash | 12 December 1957 | 12 December 1960 |
| Deputy Prime Minister | Jerry Skinner | 12 December 1957 | 12 December 1960 |
| Minister of Agriculture | Jerry Skinner | 12 December 1957 | 12 December 1960 |
| Attorney-General | Rex Mason | 12 December 1957 | 12 December 1960 |
| Minister of Broadcasting | Ray Boord | 12 December 1957 | 12 December 1960 |
| Ministry for Civil Defence | Bill Anderton | 24 June 1959 | 12 December 1960 |
| Minister of Customs | Ray Boord | 12 December 1957 | 12 December 1960 |
| Minister of Defence | Phil Connolly | 12 December 1957 | 12 December 1960 |
| Minister of Education | Philip Skoglund | 12 December 1957 | 12 December 1960 |
| Minister of Electricity | Hugh Watt | 23 September 1958 | 12 December 1960 |
| Minister of Finance | Arnold Nordmeyer | 12 December 1957 | 12 December 1960 |
| Minister of Foreign Affairs | Walter Nash | 12 December 1957 | 12 December 1960 |
| Minister of Forestry | Eruera Tirikatene | 12 December 1957 | 12 December 1960 |
| Minister of Health | Rex Mason | 12 December 1957 | 12 December 1960 |
| Minister of Housing | Bill Fox | 12 December 1957 | 12 December 1960 |
| Minister of Immigration | Fred Hackett | 12 December 1957 | 12 December 1960 |
| Minister of Industries and Commerce | Phil Holloway | 12 December 1957 | 12 December 1960 |
| Minister of Internal Affairs | Bill Anderton | 12 December 1957 | 12 December 1960 |
| Minister of Island Territories | John Mathison | 12 December 1957 | 12 December 1960 |
| Minister of Justice | Rex Mason | 12 December 1957 | 12 December 1960 |
| Minister of Labour | Fred Hackett | 12 December 1957 | 12 December 1960 |
| Minister of Maori Affairs | Walter Nash | 12 December 1957 | 12 December 1960 |
| Minister of Marine | Bill Fox | 12 December 1957 | 12 December 1960 |
| Minister of Mines | Fred Hackett | 12 December 1957 | 12 December 1960 |
| Minister of Police | Phil Connolly | 12 December 1957 | 12 December 1960 |
| Postmaster-General | Mick Moohan | 12 December 1957 | 12 December 1960 |
| Minister of Railways | Mick Moohan | 12 December 1957 | 12 December 1960 |
| Minister of Revenue | Arnold Nordmeyer | 12 December 1957 | 12 December 1960 |
| Minister of Science & Industrial Research | Phil Holloway | 12 December 1957 | 12 December 1960 |
| Minister of Social Security | Mabel Howard | 12 December 1957 | 12 December 1960 |
| Minister of Transport | John Mathison | 12 December 1957 | 12 December 1960 |
| Minister of Works | Hugh Watt | 12 December 1957 | 12 December 1960 |

== See also ==
- List of New Zealand governments
