= Eric Halstead =

New Zealand politician (1912–1991)

The Honourable Eric Halstead CBE ED
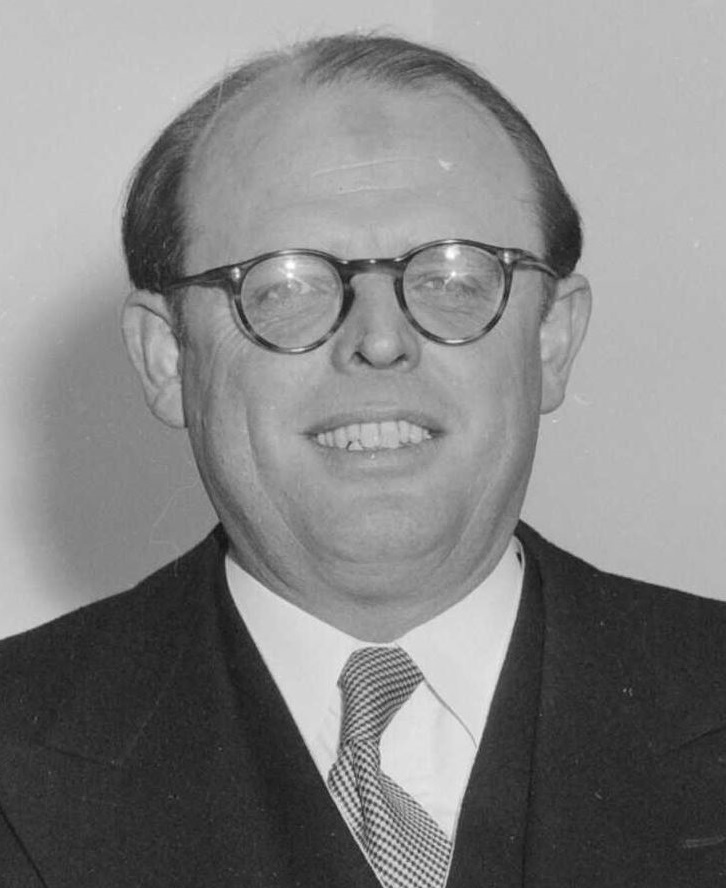

20th Minister of Industries and Commerce
- In office 23 March 1956 – 12 December 1957
- Prime Minister: Sidney Holland; Keith Holyoake
- Preceded by: Dean Eyre
- Succeeded by: Phil Holloway

5th Minister for Social Security
- In office 26 November 1954 – 23 March 1956
- Prime Minister: Sidney Holland
- Preceded by: William Bodkin
- Succeeded by: Dean Eyre

Member of the New Zealand Parliament for Tamaki
- In office 30 November 1949 – 30 November 1957
- Preceded by: Tom Skinner
- Succeeded by: Bob Tizard

Personal details
- Born: 26 May 1912 Mangaweka, New Zealand
- Died: 18 June 1991 (aged 79) Auckland, New Zealand
- Party: National
- Spouse: Millicent Joan Stewart (m. 1940)
- Education: Auckland University

Eric Henry Halstead CBE ED (26 May 1912 – 18 June 1991) was a New Zealand politician of the National Party and later a diplomat.

== Early life and career ==
Halstead was born in Auckland in 1912, and educated at Auckland Grammar School and Auckland University where he attained a Master of Arts and a Bachelor of Commerce. He was president of the Auckland University Students' Association for one year. In 1940, he married Millicent Joan Stewart; they had four children. While a student he had his first involvement in politics after being invited to hear National Party MP Gordon Coates speak in 1938.

He served as a major in the NZEF during World War II between 1941 and 1945.

After being demobilized he became a teacher and was head of the commerce and accountancy department at Seddon Technical College from 1945 to 1949.

== Political career ==
New Zealand Parliament
Years	Term	Electorate	Party
1949–1951	29th	Tamaki	National
1951–1954	30th	Tamaki	National
1954–1957	31st	Tamaki	National

He represented the Tamaki electorate from 1949 to 1957, when he was defeated by Bob Tizard. He was a liberal within the National Party and, alongside North Shore MP Dean Eyre, he supported the alternative drainage scheme in Auckland proposed by Dove-Myer Robinson. In 1953, Halstead was awarded the Queen Elizabeth II Coronation Medal.

He was the minister assisting the Prime Minister in 1954, a role in which Halstead often found his time occupied by simply delivering messages between the Prime Minister Sidney Holland and the Deputy Prime Minister Keith Holyoake. He held several cabinet posts during the last term of the First National Government including; Minister for Social Security from 1954 to 1956,Minister of Industries and Commerce and Minister for Customs from 1956 to 1957. As a minister he worked out a welfare reciprocity deal with the United Kingdom and he established the Tourist Hotel Corporation.

After his defeat in 1957 Halstead became a director of Air New Zealand. Halstead remained an active member of the National Party well after his defeat, despite not wishing to re-enter parliament by standing in Tamaki again. He was a longtime member of the party's Dominion Council, deputy-chairman of National's Auckland division and vice-president of the party. Ahead of the 1966 he accepted nomination for the National candidacy in the much safer seat of Remuera, but lost to Allan Highet.

== Diplomatic career ==
He later served as Ambassador to Thailand and Laos 1970–1973, then Ambassador to Italy and Ambassador to Iraq concurrently from 1976–1980 and Ambassador to Saudi Arabia (while resident in Rome) 1977–1980.

== Later life and death ==
In the 1980 New Year Honours, Halstead was appointed a Commander of the Order of the British Empire.

After returning from World War II he developed an interest in war history. In 1989, a book put together by Halstead, entitled Freyberg's Men, was refused permission to be published by the New Zealand Government because it bore too close a resemblance to copyright material originally published by the New Zealand Army Board and War History Branch, Department of Internal Affairs.

He died in Auckland in 1991.

== Notes ==
Political offices
Preceded by William Bodkin	Minister for Social Security; 1954–1956	Succeeded by Dean Eyre
Preceded by William Bodkin	Minister of Tourism; 1954–1956	Succeeded by Dean Eyre
Preceded by Dean Eyre	Minister of Customs; 1956–1957	Succeeded by Ray Boord
Preceded by Dean Eyre	Minister of Industries and Commerce; 1956–1957	Succeeded by Phil Holloway
New Zealand Parliament
Preceded by Tom Skinner	Member of Parliament for Tamaki; 1949–1957	Succeeded by Bob Tizard
