= Dean Eyre =

New Zealand politician

The Honourable Dean Eyre
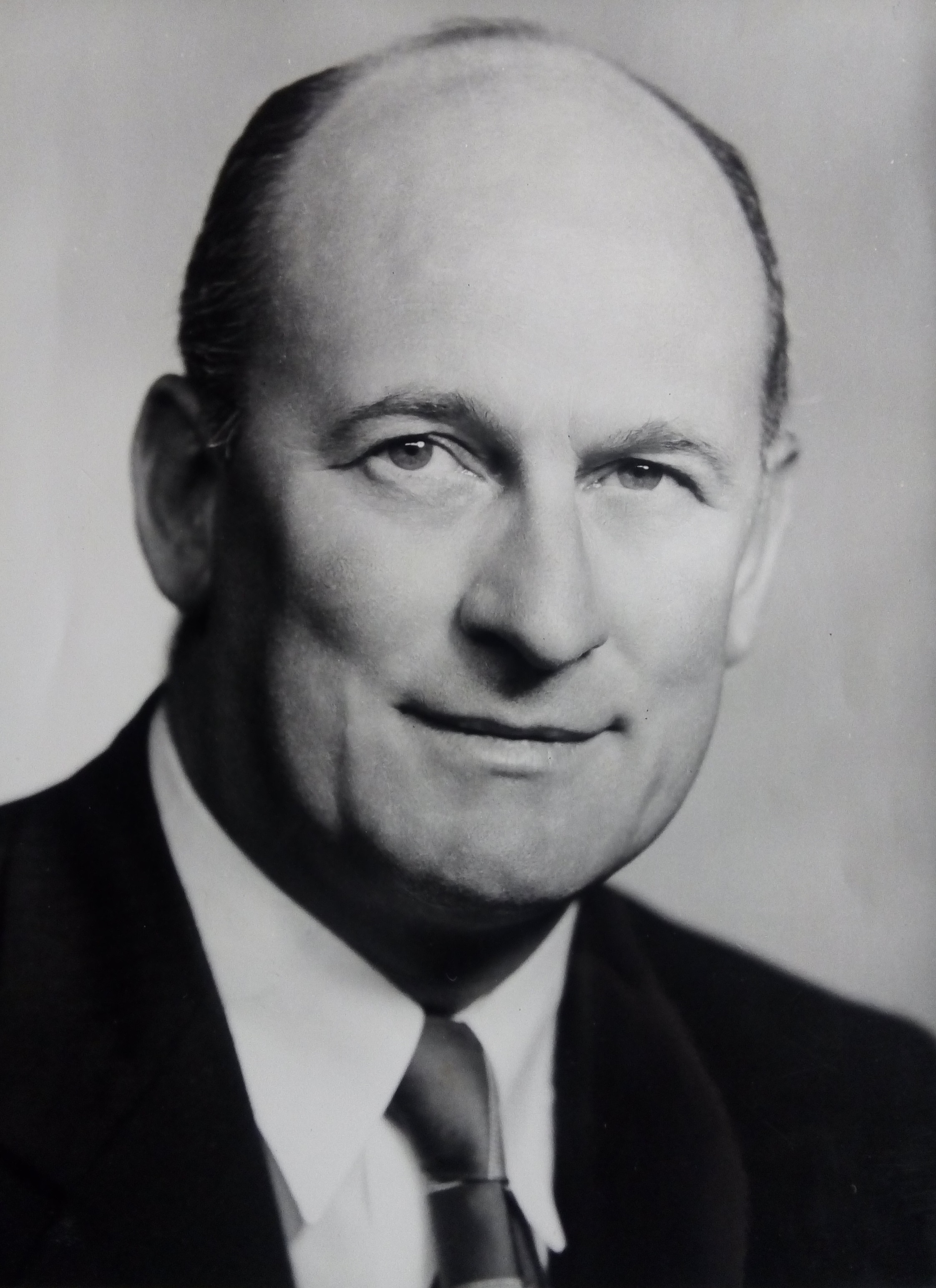

9th New Zealand High Commissioner to Canada
- In office 7 December 1976 – 15 January 1980
- Appointed by: Robert Muldoon
- Preceded by: Jack Shepherd
- Succeeded by: Ed Latter
- In office 30 August 1968 – 7 November 1973
- Appointed by: Keith Holyoake
- Preceded by: Sir Leon Götz
- Succeeded by: Jack Shepherd

21st Minister of Defence
- In office 12 December 1960 – 12 December 1966
- Prime Minister: Keith Holyoake
- Preceded by: Phil Connolly
- Succeeded by: David Thomson
- In office 26 September 1957 – 12 December 1957
- Prime Minister: Keith Holyoake
- Preceded by: Tom Macdonald
- Succeeded by: Phil Connolly

5th Minister of Housing
- In office 13 February 1957 – 26 September 1957
- Prime Minister: Sidney Holland; Keith Holyoake
- Preceded by: Bill Sullivan
- Succeeded by: John Rae

6th Minister for Social Security
- In office 23 March 1956 – 13 February 1957
- Prime Minister: Sidney Holland
- Preceded by: Eric Halstead
- Succeeded by: Geoff Gerard

19th Minister of Industries and Commerce
- In office 26 November 1954 – 23 March 1956
- Prime Minister: Sidney Holland
- Preceded by: Jack Watts
- Succeeded by: Eric Halstead

Member of the New Zealand Parliament for North Shore
- In office 30 November 1949 – 26 November 1966
- Preceded by: Martyn Finlay
- Succeeded by: George Gair

Personal details
- Born: 8 May 1914 Westport, New Zealand
- Died: 19 May 2007 (aged 93) Ottawa, Canada
- Party: National
- Other political affiliations: Reform
- Spouse: Patricia Arnoldson
- Children: 3
- Education: University of Auckland
- Occupation: Company manager

Dean Jack Eyre (8 May 1914 – 19 May 2007) was a New Zealand politician of the National Party.

== Biography ==
=== Early life and career ===
Eyre was born in Westport in 1914. His father was an official with the Customs Department and due to this the family moved around frequently, first on the West Coast then also living in New Plymouth, Takapuna and Ngāruawāhia later being educated at Hamilton Boys' High School. He developed an interest in politics early when he attended a political rally with his father in New Plymouth leading him to eventually join the junior league of the Reform Party in about 1933.

Aged 18, he moved to Auckland to study law at Auckland University College. Two years later his money ran out and was forced to give up his legal studies and eventually became a commercial traveller for a car parts company. He then in 1936 founded Airco (NZ) Ltd, a business importing American designed washing machines, refrigerators and other appliances which were assembled in a small factory just off Queen Street. His flatmates at the time were Maurice Paykel, Lou and Woolf Fisher who later went into business in the same industry on their own account. They four would remained lifelong friends. In 1937 he married Patricia Arnoldson, with whom he had 2 sons and one daughter. In 1938 Eyre had to suspend his business after imports from the United States were restricted by the government.

At his American suppliers invitation, he moved to Honolulu in 1939 whence he was offered the Hawaiian sales territory. He was living there when the Japanese bombed Pearl Harbor. Soon after the attack he and his family were evacuated to San Francisco alongside hundreds of other families. He subsequently joined the Royal Navy Volunteer Reserve and served on destroyers in England and the Atlantic from 1941 to 1945. He later served in the Royal New Zealand Naval Volunteer Reserve at Freetown, Sierra Leone holding the rank of lieutenant.

He and his family returned to New Zealand when he was demobilised in 1946. Upon returning he relaunched the Airco company which later became the first New Zealand assembler of Vespa scooters.

=== Political career ===
New Zealand Parliament
| Years | Term | Electorate | Party |
|---|---|---|---|
| 1949–1951 | 29th | North Shore | National |
| 1951–1954 | 30th | North Shore | National |
| 1954–1957 | 31st | North Shore | National |
| 1957–1960 | 32nd | North Shore | National |
| 1960–1963 | 33rd | North Shore | National |
| 1963–1966 | 34th | North Shore | National |

Before leaving New Zealand Eyre had joined the National Party and had impressed party officials. In 1949 he was selected to contest the Labour held seat of North Shore. To National organisers surprise, and in spite of his support for an Auckland harbour bridge paid for by tolls, he won the seat. He represented the North Shore seat from the 29th to 34th parliaments until 1966, when he retired. He was a liberal within the National Party and, alongside Tamaki MP Eric Halstead, he supported the alternative drainage scheme in Auckland proposed by Dove-Myer Robinson.

He served as a cabinet minister, initially under Sidney Holland as Minister of Industries and Commerce and Minister of Customs from 1954 to 1956. In February 1956, Holland announced that Eyre had been granted six weeks leave in order to attend to private business in Sweden. The Leader of the Opposition, Walter Nash, was critical of the decision. Nash questioned the appropriateness of a minister of the crown conducting his private business abroad. Holland was quick to dismiss any suggestion of impropriety, but was soon to swallow his words. Both The Evening Post and The Dominion (Wellington papers who normally wrote editorials slanted in favour of National) also went on the attack in editorials, urging Holland to reconsider. A surprised Holland reacted quickly and Eyre was forced to cancel his trip, and was stripped of his portfolios and given to Eric Halstead. To ease the situation, Eyre was allocated Halstead's portfolios instead. From 1956 to 1957 he served as Minister for Social Security and Minister of Tourist and Health Resorts. He was later given the additional roles of Minister of Housing and Minister of Police (1956–1957). In Keith Holyoake's first ministry in 1957, he carried on as Minister of Housing, and became Minister of Defence. From 1957 to 1960, while National was in opposition, he remained on the front bench and was Shadow Minister of Defence and Housing.

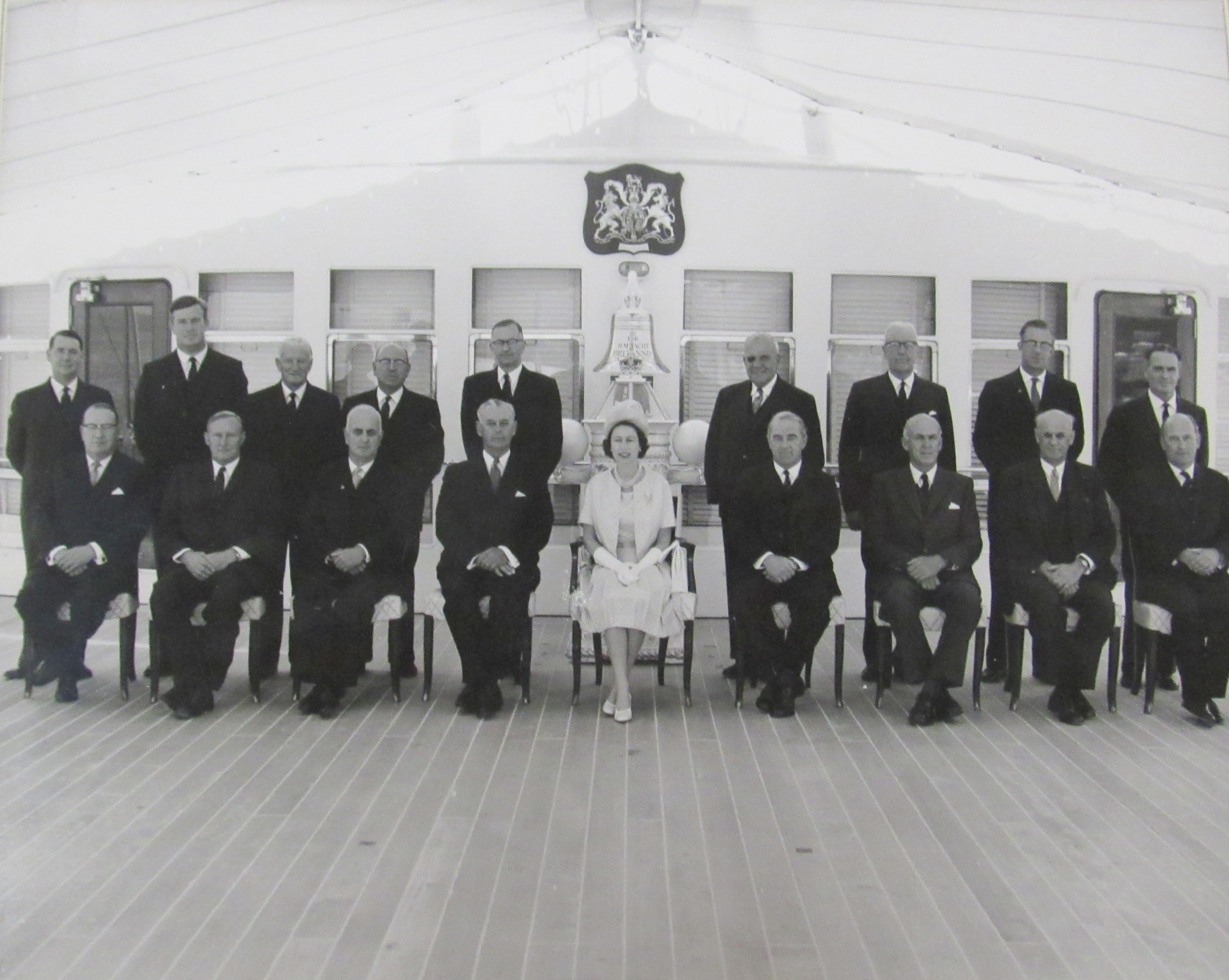
Eyre (front right) in 1963

In Holyoake's second ministry, he was again Minister of Defence (1960–1966), and Minister of Housing (1960–1963), and was Minister of Tourism (1963–1966). Under Holyoake's government, New Zealand decided to join the contentious United States led Vietnam War. Auckland newspaper The New Zealand Herald reported that on 23 November 1966, Eyre had responded to an election meeting question in Devonport that his personal solution to end the war in Vietnam was to drop "a basin full of bombs" on the enemy. Leader of the Opposition, Norman Kirk, took advantage of the Herald article as the war was a large issue at the 1966 election. Eyre claimed the reporting was not contextually related to his comments about military targets and he successfully sued for defamation over the reporting of the remark. He sought $50,000 in damages from the Herald, and $50,000 each from its publisher Wilson and Horton and from the New Zealand Press Association. He won, and in March 1968 was awarded $15,000 from them and later an undisclosed amount from The Dominion. Soon afterwards, at a social function Eyre bumped in to Kirk where Kirk said he was anticipating also being in line for a damages claim. Eyre affirmed this and told Kirk "You can't afford it." To avoid litigation an apology was drafted and published by Kirk.

He was then High Commissioner to Canada from 1968 to 1973. He would have gone to London instead of Ottawa if he had not been involved in the misreporting incident at the 1966 election campaign. When his first three-year term as high commissioner was close to ending in 1972, Kirk, by then prime minister, signed off on an extension of Eyre's term. He was viewed as a solid performer in the role despite it not regarded as a difficult one. He believed Robert Muldoon's leadership was the cause for National's fall of support comparative to the 1960s and thought the Muldoon government cabinet was weaker than previous National cabinets.

He served a second period as High Commissioner to Canada from 1976 to 1980. After the completion of his second term he and his wife decided to remain in Canada. They decided to stay on because his sons and their families were both living there, and it was closer to the United Kingdom where his daughter was living, making it easier for he and his wife to visit her.

=== Later life and death ===
From the 1970s to 1990s he was continually cited as an example of the extravagance of perks for former parliamentarians. In the 1990s insinuations were levelled that retired three-term MPs were "milking the public purse" by exercising their right to a 90% pension-related travel rebate which had been granted in 1972, in lieu of a pension increase. In Eyre's case, he was spending around $10,000 every year and a half on air fees from his home in Ottawa (where he had retired) to visit his daughter in the United Kingdom.

Eyre frequently fielded calls from New Zealand journalists at his home in Ottawa which he found increasingly irritating. In 1995 he was in the news again after The Dominion falsely reported that he had died. Three years later, ACT MP Rodney Hide listed him as an example why the annual travel perk for former MPs should be ended (which it was in 1999). Upon the law change The Nelson Mail reported:

The most outrageous use of this privilege has been by former defence minister Dean Eyre, who has not lived in New Zealand for 30 years. He retired in Canada after serving as high commissioner there, and has vigorously defended his right to continue travelling at New Zealand taxpayers' expense. Other former MPs have claimed the travel perk was compensation for a deferred pay increase, but the argument holds no validity.

In 2003 Eyre was rendered disabled after suffering a stroke. He died in Ottawa on 19 May 2007. His wife of 69 years, Patricia, had died in August 2006. They were survived by two sons and a daughter.

== Honours and awards ==
In 1953, Eyre was awarded the Queen Elizabeth II Coronation Medal, and in 1977 he received the Queen Elizabeth II Silver Jubilee Medal. He was also awarded the New Zealand 1990 Commemoration Medal.

== Notes ==
New Zealand Parliament
| Preceded by Martyn Finlay | Member of Parliament for North Shore; 1949–1966 | Succeeded by George Gair |
Political offices
| Preceded by Jack Watts | Minister of Industries and Commerce; 1954-1956 | Succeeded by Eric Halstead |
| Preceded by Eric Halstead | Minister for Social Security; 1956-1957 | Succeeded by Geoff Gerard |
| Preceded by Bill Sullivan | Minister of Housing; 1957 | Succeeded by John Rae |
| Preceded by Tom Macdonald | Minister of Defence; 1957 1960–1966 | Succeeded by Phil Connolly |
| Preceded by Phil Connolly | Minister of Defence; 1957 1960–1966 | Succeeded by David Thomson |
Diplomatic posts
| Preceded by Sir Leon Götz | High Commissioner to Canada; 1968–1973 1976–1980 | Succeeded by Jack Shepherd |
| Preceded by Jack Shepherd | High Commissioner to Canada; 1968–1973 1976–1980 | Succeeded by Ed Latter |
