= Minister of Industries and Commerce =

New Zealand minister of the Crown

The minister of industries and commerce in New Zealand is a former cabinet position (existing from 1894 to 1972) appointed by the Prime Minister to be in charge of matters of industrial and commercial growth and trade. In 1972 it was replaced with the new office of Minister of Trade and Industry.

== List of ministers ==
The following ministers have held the office of Minister of Industries and Commerce.

Key

Liberal Reform United Labour National

No.	Name	Portrait	Term of Office		Prime Minister
1	Joseph Ward		20 January 1894	2 March 1896	Seddon
2	Thomas Thompson		2 March 1896	21 December 1899	Seddon
(1)	Joseph Ward		21 December 1899	23 November 1906	Seddon
(1)	Joseph Ward		21 December 1899	23 November 1906	Hall-Jones
(1)	Joseph Ward		21 December 1899	23 November 1906	Ward
3	James McGowan		23 November 1906	6 January 1909	Ward
4	Thomas Mackenzie		6 January 1909	10 July 1912	Ward
4	Thomas Mackenzie		6 January 1909	10 July 1912	Mackenzie
5	William Fraser		10 July 1912	26 July 1912	Massey
6	William Massey		26 July 1912	22 June 1920	Massey
7	Ernest Lee		22 June 1920	13 January 1923	Massey
8	William Downie Stewart		13 January 1923	24 May 1926	Massey
8	William Downie Stewart		13 January 1923	24 May 1926	Bell
8	William Downie Stewart		13 January 1923	24 May 1926	Coates
9	Alex McLeod		24 May 1926	28 November 1928	Coates
10	Alexander Young		28 November 1928	10 December 1928	Coates
11	John Cobbe		10 December 1928	18 December 1929	Ward
12	James Donald		18 December 1929	28 May 1930	Ward
13	Philip De La Perrelle		28 May 1930	22 September 1931	Forbes
14	Robert Masters		22 September 1931	6 December 1935	Forbes
15	Dan Sullivan		6 December 1935	8 April 1947	Savage
15	Dan Sullivan		6 December 1935	8 April 1947	Fraser
16	Arnold Nordmeyer		29 May 1947	12 December 1949	Fraser
17	Charles Bowden		12 December 1949	19 December 1950	Holland
18	Jack Watts		19 December 1950	26 November 1954	Holland
19	Dean Eyre		26 November 1954	23 March 1956	Holland
20	Eric Halstead		23 March 1956	12 December 1957	Holland
20	Eric Halstead		23 March 1956	12 December 1957	Holyoake
21	Phil Holloway		12 December 1957	12 December 1960	Nash
22	Jack Marshall		12 December 1960	22 December 1969	Holyoake
23	Norman Shelton		22 December 1969	9 February 1972	Holyoake
24	Brian Talboys		9 February 1972	24 October 1972	Marshall
