= Second National Government of New Zealand =

Government of New Zealand, 1960–1972

Second National Government
- Ministries of New Zealand
- 1960–1972
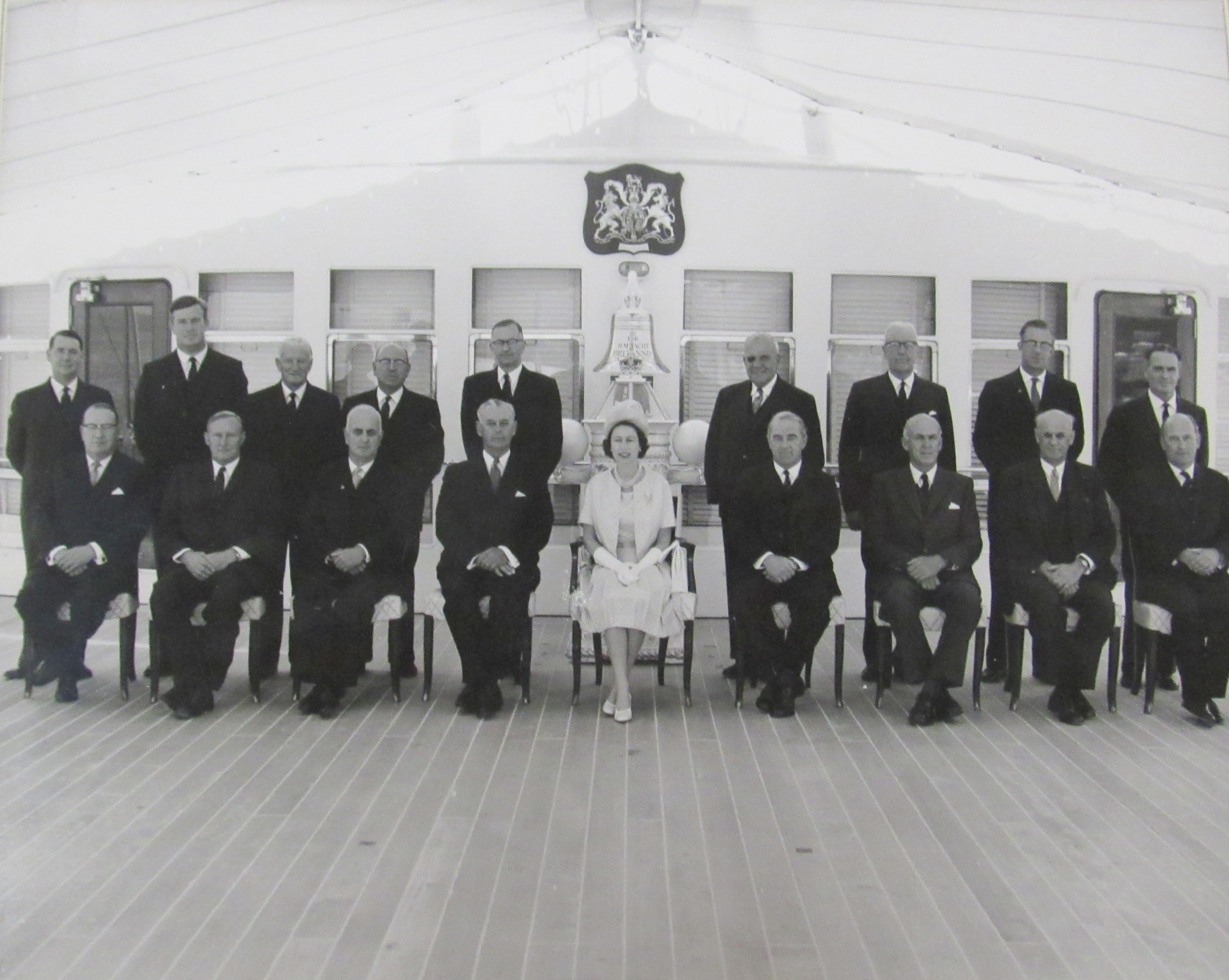
- Date formed: 12 December 1960
- Date dissolved: 8 December 1972

People and organisations
- Monarch: Elizabeth II
- Prime Minister: Keith Holyoake (1960-1972); Jack Marshall (1972)
- Deputy Prime Minister: Jack Marshall (1960-1972); Robert Muldoon (1972)
- Member party: National Party
- Opposition party: Labour Party
- Opposition leader: Walter Nash (1960-1963); Arnold Nordmeyer (1963–1965); Norman Kirk (1965–1972)

History
- Elections: 1963 general election 1966 general election 1969 general election
- Predecessor: Second Labour Government of New Zealand
- Successor: Third Labour Government of New Zealand

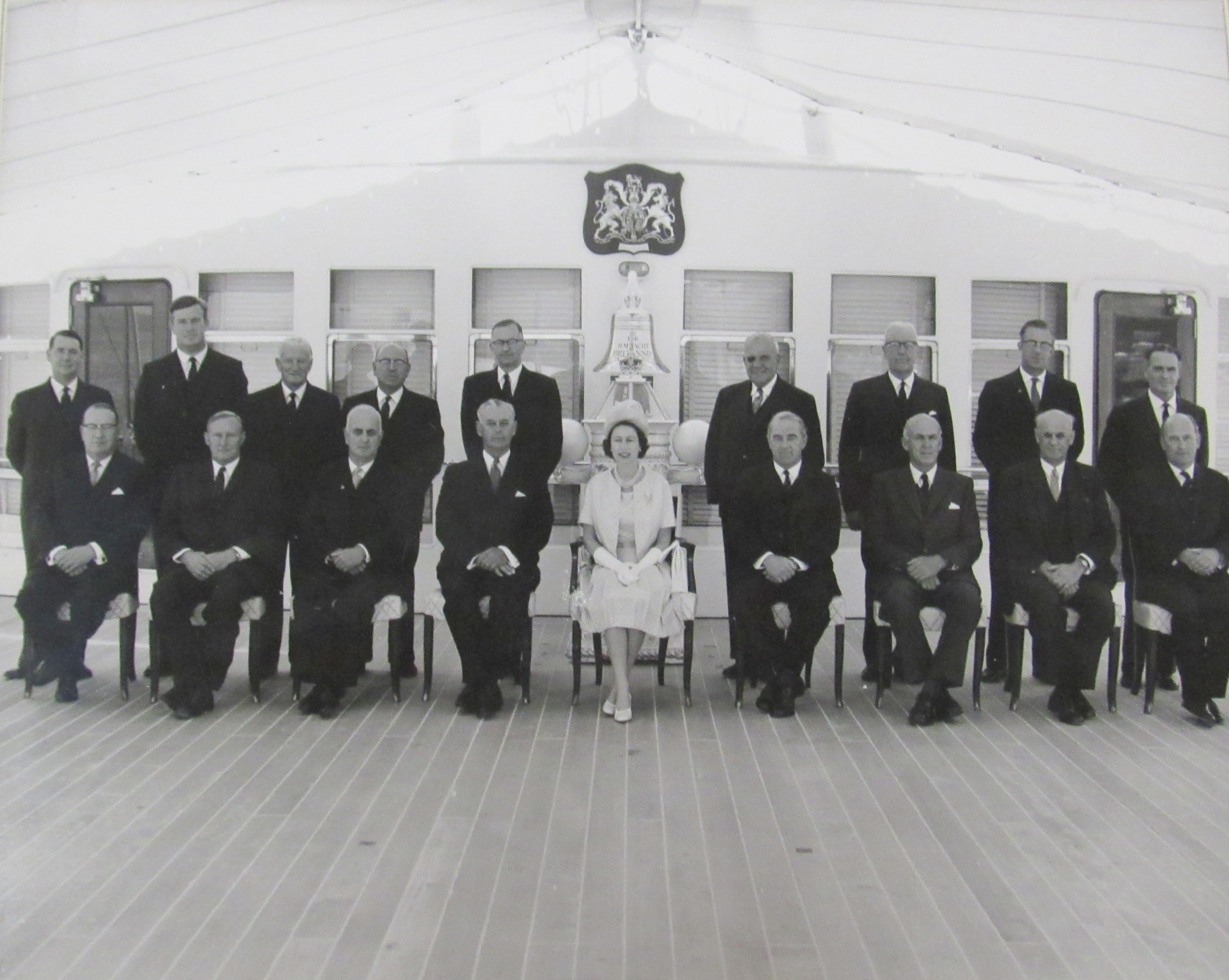
Second National Government

The Second National Government of New Zealand (also known as the Holyoake Government, after head of government Keith Holyoake) was the government of New Zealand from 1960 to 1972. It was a conservative government which sought mainly to preserve the economic prosperity and general stability of the early 1960s. It was one of New Zealand's longest-serving governments.

== Significant policies ==
=== Economic policy ===
- Compulsory unionism was relaxed.
- Negotiated continued access to United Kingdom markets following the UK's acceptance into the European Economic Community.

=== Treaty of Waitangi and Māori policy ===
- Responded to the increasing urbanisation of the Māori people with a policy of cultural assimilation, which aimed to integrate Māori into Pākehā lifestyles. This policy included the abolition of the Native School system in 1969.
- Amended the Waitangi Day Act 1960 to make Waitangi Day a public holiday in the Northland region.

=== Other ===
- On 12 October 1961 ten National MPs voted with the Opposition and removed capital punishment for murder from the Crimes Bill that the government had introduced, by a vote of 41 to 30. Ralph Hanan, the Minister of Justice who had introduced the bill, was one of them.
- The Criminal Injuries Compensation Act of 1963 introduced compensation for criminal injuries.
- Family maintenance allowances were introduced (1968).
- In 1967 after a referendum on 23 September, bar closing times were extended from 6pm to 10pm on 9 October.
- In 1968, emergency benefit was systematised into a discretionary Domestic Purposes Benefit (this was replaced by the statutory Domestic purposes Benefit in 1973).
- In 1969, the general medical services benefit was raised for beneficiaries, while specialist benefit was introduced.
- A rural incentives scheme for doctors was introduced (1969).
- Income abatement on benefits was simplified (1971).

=== Foreign affairs ===
- New Zealand troops committed to the defence of Malaysia in the Indonesia-Malaysia confrontation.
- Committed a small number of New Zealand troops to the Vietnam War.
- Re-established compulsory military training.

=== Constitutional ===
- Appointed the first New Zealand born Governor-General in 1967 (Sir Arthur Porritt) and the first New Zealand born and New Zealand resident Governor-General, Sir Denis Blundell in 1972.
- Voting age lowered to 20, from 21.

== Formation ==
The key issue of the 1960 election was the 'Black Budget' of 1958, in which the Labour government had raised taxes on alcohol, petrol and cigarettes. Although the government argued that it was necessary to address a balance of payments crisis, National continually attacked the government for it, and most historians consider that it lost Labour the election after only one term in office. Another, less important factor, may have been the age of Labour's leadership. Prime Minister Walter Nash was 78 in 1960, and had been Finance Minister in the first Labour government 25 years earlier. Voters probably considered him and many of his team old and out of touch in contrast with National leader Keith Holyoake, who in 1960 was only in his mid 50s.

The phrase Young Turk was used by Ian Templeton to describe three of the new National MPs elected in 1960, Peter Gordon, Duncan MacIntyre and Robert Muldoon. The description stuck (Zavos).

== The 1963 election ==
In many ways the 1963 election was a re-run of the 1960 election. No new major issues had arisen, and Labour continued to be damaged by the 'Black Budget' of 1958. Although five years had passed since the budget, its architect, Arnold Nordmeyer, was now Labour Party leader following the retirement of Nash earlier in 1963. Voters continued to associate Nordmeyer, and therefore the party, with the unpopular budget. It is normal for governments to lose some support during their term, but National's share of the popular vote was only 0.5% less than in 1960, and it lost only one seat, retaining a majority of 10.

== The 1966 election ==
Shortly before the 1966 election, Labour had replaced Nordmeyer as leader with Norman Kirk, but Kirk had insufficient time to consolidate his position and the party was damaged by this and division over economic policy. The main difference between the parties in terms of policy was commitment to the Vietnam War. The National government had committed a small number of troops, seeing support for American wars as a necessary payment for America's commitment (through the ANZUS pact) to protect New Zealand. Labour was opposed to New Zealand involvement in the war and made troop recall a major platform. However the strongest anti-war sentiment was probably amongst young people, and at this stage the voting age was 21. The election resulted in National losing 3.5% of the popular vote, and one seat, to Social Credit. This marked the first time since 1943 that a seat had been won by a party other than Labour or National.

== The 1969 election ==
Before the 1969 election the voting age was lowered from 21 to 20, and the number of electorates was increased from 80 to 84, to reflect population growth. These changes seem to have benefited National, as its share of the popular vote rose by 1.6% and it regained the seat it had lost (Hobson) to Social Credit. This is a rare example of a government increasing its share of the vote while in power.

== Defeat ==
Like Labour in 1960, National in 1972 appeared old, worn-out and out of touch. Holyoake had been in Parliament for all but one term since 1932. He had been a founding member of the National Party in 1936, and had been on National's front bench since the 1940s. His conservative bent was seen as a poor fit for the times. His resignation in favour of deputy Jack Marshall did little to revitalise the party. Marshall lacked the charisma of Labour leader Norman Kirk, and had little time to establish himself before an election later that year. The government was defeated less on any particular policy than on a general feeling that, as Labour's campaign material put it, it was time for a change.

== Election results ==
Election	Parliament	Seats	Total votes	Percentage	Gain (loss)	Seats won	Change	Majority
1960	33rd	80	1,170,503	47.6%	+3.4%	46	+7	12
1963	34th	80	1,198,045	47.1%	-0.5%	45	-1	10
1966	35th	80	1,205,095	43.6%	-3.5%	44	-1	8
1969	36th	84		45.2%	+1.6%	45	+1	6
1972	37th	87		41.5%	-7%	32	-13	-

== Prime ministers ==
Keith Holyoake was Prime Minister for almost the entire term of this government, from 12 December 1960 until 7 February 1972 when he resigned. He was replaced by Jack Marshall, with the terms of other ministers commencing on 9 February 1972. The Marshall Ministry stepped down on 8 December 1972.

Prime Ministers of the Second National Government

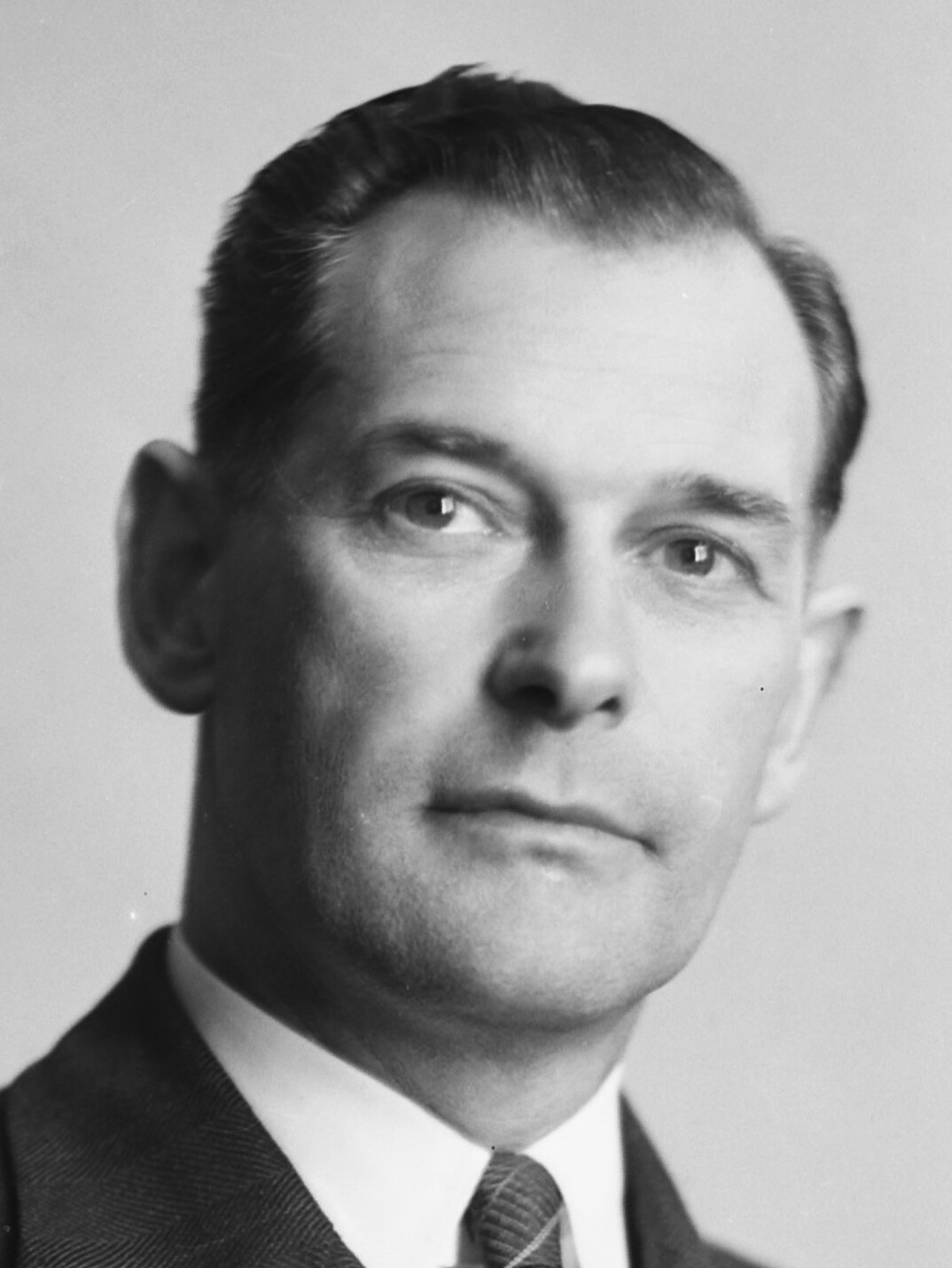
Keith Holyoake
served 1960–1972

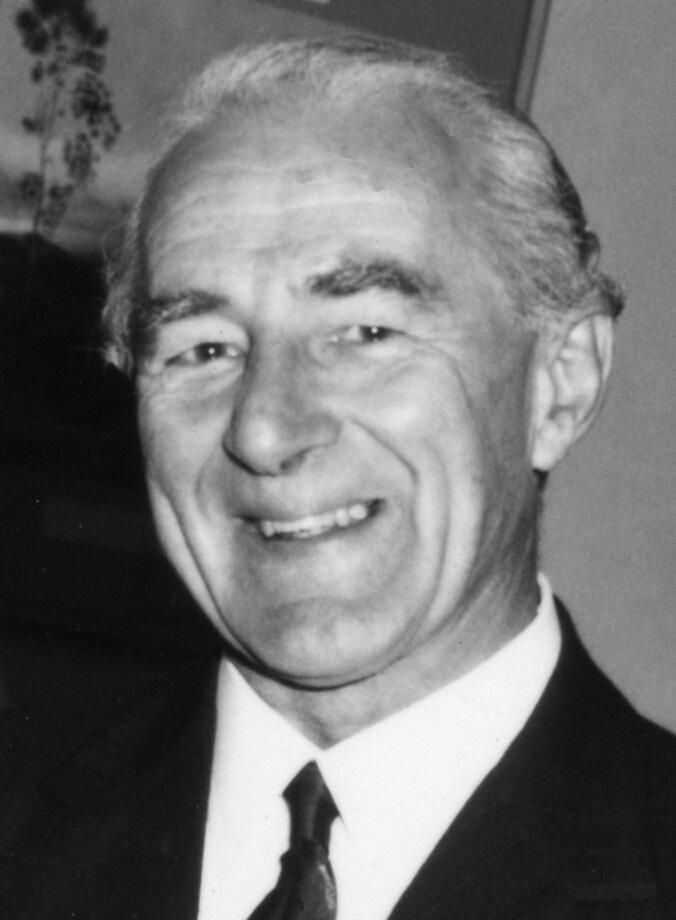
Jack Marshall
served 1972

== Cabinet ministers ==
Portfolio	Minister	Start	End
Prime Minister	Keith Holyoake	12 December 1960	7 February 1972
Prime Minister	Jack Marshall	7 February 1972	8 December 1972
Deputy Prime Minister	Jack Marshall	12 December 1960	7 February 1972
Deputy Prime Minister	Robert Muldoon	7 February 1972	8 December 1972
Minister of Agriculture	William Gillespie	12 December 1960	23 April 1961
Minister of Agriculture	Thomas Hayman	2 May 1961	2 January 1962
Minister of Agriculture	Brian Talboys	24 January 1962	22 December 1969
Minister of Agriculture	Douglas Carter	22 December 1969	8 December 1972
Attorney-General	Ralph Hanan	12 December 1960	22 December 1969
Attorney-General	Jack Marshall	22 December 1969	2 February 1971
Attorney-General	Dan Riddiford	2 February 1971	9 February 1972
Attorney-General	Roy Jack	9 February 1972	8 December 1972
Minister of Broadcasting	Arthur Kinsella	12 December 1960	20 December 1963
Minister of Broadcasting	Jack Scott	20 December 1963	15 February 1967
Minister of Broadcasting	Lance Adams-Schneider	15 February 1967	22 December 1969
Minister of Broadcasting	Bert Walker	22 December 1969	8 December 1972
Minister of Customs	Jack Marshall	12 December 1960	24 January 1962
Minister of Customs	Norman Shelton	24 January 1962	12 December 1969
Minister of Customs	Lance Adams-Schneider	12 December 1969	9 February 1972
Minister of Customs	George Gair	9 February 1972	8 December 1972
Minister of Defence	Dean Eyre	12 December 1960	12 December 1966
Minister of Defence	David Thomson	12 December 1966	9 February 1972
Minister of Defence	Allan McCready	9 February 1972	8 December 1972
Minister of Education	Blair Tennent	12 December 1960	20 December 1963
Minister of Education	Arthur Kinsella	20 December 1963	22 December 1969
Minister of Education	Brian Talboys	22 December 1969	9 February 1972
Minister of Education	Lorrie Pickering	9 February 1972	8 December 1972
Minister of Finance	Harry Lake	12 December 1960	21 February 1967
Minister of Finance	Robert Muldoon	21 February 1967	8 December 1972
Minister of Foreign Affairs	Keith Holyoake	12 December 1960	8 December 1972
Minister of Forestry	Geoff Gerard	12 December 1960	12 December 1966
Minister of Forestry	Duncan MacIntyre	12 December 1966	8 December 1972
Minister of Health	Norman Shelton	12 December 1960	24 January 1962
Minister of Health	Don McKay	24 January 1962	9 February 1972
Minister of Health	Lance Adams-Schneider	9 February 1972	8 December 1972
Minister of Housing	John Rae	12 December 1960	9 February 1972
Minister of Housing	Eric Holland	9 February 1972	8 December 1972
Minister of Immigration	Tom Shand	12 December 1960	22 December 1969
Minister of Immigration	Jack Marshall	22 December 1969	9 February 1972
Minister of Immigration	David Thomson	9 February 1972	8 December 1972
Minister of Industries and Commerce	Jack Marshall	12 December 1960	22 December 1969
Minister of Industries and Commerce	Norman Shelton	22 December 1969	9 February 1972
Minister of Industries and Commerce	Brian Talboys	9 February 1972	24 October 1972
Minister of Internal Affairs	Leon Götz	12 December 1960	20 December 1963
Minister of Internal Affairs	David Seath	20 December 1963	9 February 1972
Minister of Internal Affairs	Allan Highet	9 February 1972	8 December 1972
Minister of Island Territories	Leon Götz	12 December 1960	20 December 1963
Minister of Island Territories	Ralph Hanan	20 December 1963	24 July 1969
Minister of Island Territories	Duncan MacIntyre	24 July 1969	8 December 1972
Minister of Justice	Ralph Hanan	12 December 1960	24 July 1969
Minister of Justice	Dan Riddiford	22 December 1969	9 February 1972
Minister of Justice	Roy Jack	9 February 1972	8 December 1972
Minister of Labour	Tom Shand	12 December 1960	11 December 1969
Minister of Labour	Jack Marshall	12 December 1969	7 February 1972
Minister of Labour	David Thomson	7 February 1972	8 December 1972
Minister of Maori Affairs	Ralph Hanan	12 December 1960	24 July 1969
Minister of Maori Affairs	Duncan MacIntyre	22 December 1969	8 December 1972
Minister of Marine	John McAlpine	12 December 1960	2 May 1961
Minister of Marine	Geoff Gerard	2 May 1961	20 December 1963
Minister of Marine	Jack Scott	20 December 1963	22 December 1969
Minister of Marine	Allan McCready	22 December 1969	9 February 1972
Minister of Marine	Peter Gordon	9 February 1972	8 December 1972
Minister of Mines	Tom Shand	12 December 1960	11 December 1969
Minister of Mines	Norman Shelton	22 December 1969	9 February 1972
Minister of Mines	Les Gandar	9 February 1972	8 December 1972
Minister of Police	Dean Eyre	12 December 1960	20 December 1963
Minister of Police	Percy Allen	20 December 1963	22 December 1969
Minister of Police	David Thomson	22 December 1969	9 February 1972
Minister of Police	Percy Allen	9 February 1972	8 December 1972
Postmaster-General	Thomas Hayman	12 December 1960	2 May 1961
Postmaster-General	Arthur Kinsella	2 May 1961	20 December 1963
Postmaster-General	Jack Scott	20 December 1963	22 December 1969
Postmaster-General	Allan McCready	22 December 1969	9 February 1972
Postmaster-General	Bert Walker	9 February 1972	8 December 1972
Minister of Railways	John McAlpine	12 December 1960	12 December 1966
Minister of Railways	Peter Gordon	12 December 1966	8 December 1972
Minister for Social Security	Norman Shelton	12 December 1960	24 January 1962
Minister for Social Security	Don McKay	24 January 1962	9 February 1972
Minister for Social Security	Lance Adams-Schneider	9 February 1972	8 December 1972
Minister of Trade	Jack Marshall	12 December 1960	9 February 1972
Minister of Trade	Brian Talboys	9 February 1972	8 December 1972
Minister of Transport	John McAlpine	12 December 1960	12 December 1966
Minister of Transport	Peter Gordon	12 December 1966	8 December 1972
Minister of Works	Stan Goosman	12 December 1960	20 December 1963
Minister of Works	Percy Allen	20 December 1963	8 December 1972

== See also ==
- List of New Zealand governments
- New Zealand National Party
