= Minister for Women (New Zealand) =

New Zealand minister of the Crown

- Coat of Arms of New Zealand

- Flag of New Zealand

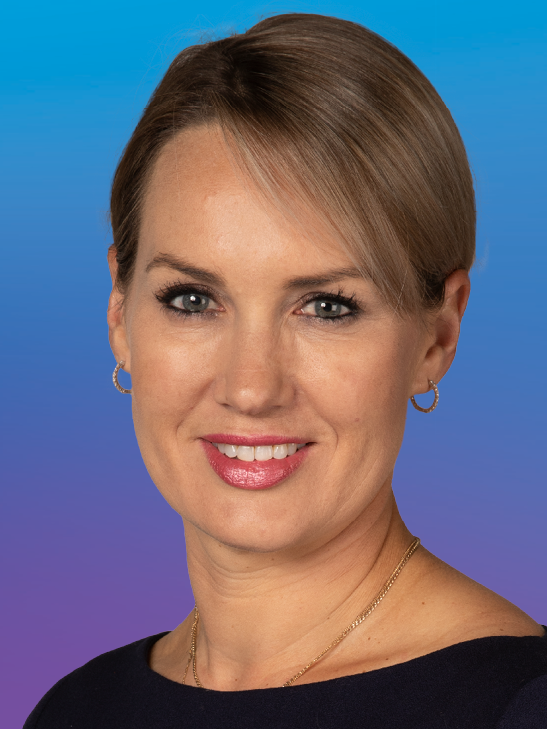
- Incumbent; Nicola Grigg since 27 November 2023
- Ministry for Women
- Style: The Honourable
- Member of: Cabinet of New Zealand; Executive Council
- Reports to: Prime Minister of New Zealand
- Appointer: Governor-General of New Zealand
- Term length: At His Majesty's pleasure
- Inaugural holder: Ann Hercus
- Formation: 26 July 1984
- Salary: $288,900
- Website: www.beehive.govt.nz

The Minister for Women is a minister in the New Zealand Government with responsibility for the rights and interests of the country's female citizens. It has been a post in all New Zealand governments since 1984. The Minister leads the Ministry for Women.

The post was established by the Fourth Labour Government on 26 July 1984 preceding the creation of the ministry. It was split from the Social Welfare portfolio after a recommendation from Advisory Committee on Women's Affairs. Holders of the post were known as the Minister for Women's Affairs until December 2014, with the department known as the Ministry of Women's Affairs. There had been a previous ministerial post from 1949 to 1972 adjunct to the Social Security portfolio titled Minister for the Welfare of Women and Children with a similar brief.

== Ministers for Women ==
The following ministers have held the office:

Key

Labour National Alliance Green

No.	Name	Portrait	Term of Office		Prime Minister
Minister for the Welfare of Women and Children (1949–72)
1	Hilda Ross		13 December 1949	12 December 1957	Holland
1	Hilda Ross		13 December 1949	12 December 1957	Holyoake
2	Mabel Howard		12 December 1957	2 June 1959	Nash
-	Philip Skoglund; Acting Minister		2 June 1959	25 August 1959	Nash
(2)	Mabel Howard		25 August 1959	12 December 1960	Nash
3	Norman Shelton		12 December 1960	24 January 1962	Holyoake
4	Don McKay		24 January 1962	9 February 1972	Holyoake
Minister for Women (1984–present)
1	Ann Hercus		26 July 1984	24 August 1987	Lange
2	Margaret Shields		24 August 1987	2 November 1990	Lange
2	Margaret Shields		24 August 1987	2 November 1990	Palmer
2	Margaret Shields		24 August 1987	2 November 1990	Moore
3	Jenny Shipley		2 November 1990	12 December 1996	Bolger
4	Christine Fletcher		12 December 1996	11 September 1997	Bolger
(3)	Jenny Shipley		11 September 1997	26 August 1998	Bolger
(3)	Jenny Shipley		11 September 1997	26 August 1998	Shipley
5	Georgina te Heuheu		26 August 1998	10 December 1999	Shipley
6	Laila Harré		10 December 1999	15 August 2002	Clark
7	Ruth Dyson		15 August 2002	19 October 2005	Clark
8	Lianne Dalziel		19 October 2005	5 November 2007	Clark
9	Stephanie Chadwick		5 November 2007	19 November 2008	Clark
10	Pansy Wong		19 November 2008	12 November 2010	Key
(5)	Georgina te Heuheu acting		12 November 2010	8 December 2010	Key
11	Hekia Parata		8 December 2010	13 December 2011	Key
12	Jo Goodhew		13 December 2011	8 October 2014	Key
13	Louise Upston		8 October 2014	20 December 2016	Key
14	Paula Bennett		20 December 2016	26 October 2017	English
15	Julie Anne Genter		26 October 2017	6 November 2020	Ardern
16	Jan Tinetti		6 November 2020	27 November 2023	Ardern
16	Jan Tinetti		6 November 2020	27 November 2023	Hipkins
17	Nicola Grigg		27 November 2023	present	Luxon
