= Eva Hill =

New Zealand doctor

Eva Esther Hill (19 September 1898 – 17 April 1981, née Day) was a New Zealand medical doctor, medical superintendent, writer, publicist and health campaigner.

== Early life and education ==
Eva Day was born in Parawai, Thames/Coromandel, New Zealand on 19 September 1898. She was educated at Timaru Girls' High School and graduated from the University of Otago with an MB ChB in 1921.

== Career ==
After graduating Hill was a house surgeon first at Timaru Hospital and then at Dunedin Hospital. In 1924 she became superintendent of the Whangaroa General Hospital in Northland but a year later moved to establish a practice in Piopio in the King Country. During the depression she worked as a medical officer on the East Coast of the North Island. The country was rugged and she often rode to patients on horseback. Further moves were made to the Bay of Islands in 1934, to Ruakākā in 1952 and to Auckland in 1944 where she set up a practice in Mt Eden.

She became interested in natural treatments and went to Dallas, Texas in 1956 to the Hoxsey Clinic to learn about alternative cancer therapies. She practised the Hoxsey treatments on her return to New Zealand using diet, raw apple and carrot juice and opposing x–rays and radiotherapy. She also promoted Hoxsey treatments at public meetings. Her practice and support of Hoxsey brought her into conflict with the medical establishment. The Medical Council attempted unsuccessfully to have Hill removed from the medical register because she promoted the Hoxsey cures. She resigned from the New Zealand branch of the British Medical Association in order to campaign publicly for the Hoxsey methods. She also opposed fluoridation and supported the campaign against it at meetings and in her writings.

In 1969 Hill was made an honorary member of the New Zealand Medical Women's Association.

Hill was a founding member of the Social Credit Party and stood for Parliament several times. In the 1954 and 1957 elections she stood in Marsden and in both 1963 and 1966 she stood in North Shore.

While Hill's mainstream medical colleagues disagreed with her they also acknowledged that she was a caring person and sincere in her beliefs.

== Personal life ==
Hill married in 1927. She met her husband Justly Hill in Whangaroa and they had two children.

She died in Te Awamutu in 1981.

== Selected publications ==
- Co-existence (1955)
- Facts about fluoridation of water supplies (1955)
- There are worse ills than death! (1955)
- A simple guide to better health (1976) - 2nd edition
- Light behind the headlines : a simple guide to some causes of present world unrest (1976)
- Don't be scared of cancer : try to understand its causes and avoid the obvious ones (1978)
- Why be scared of cancer? (1979)
