= Jack Scott (New Zealand politician) =

New Zealand politician (1916–2001)

The Honourable Jack Scott QSO
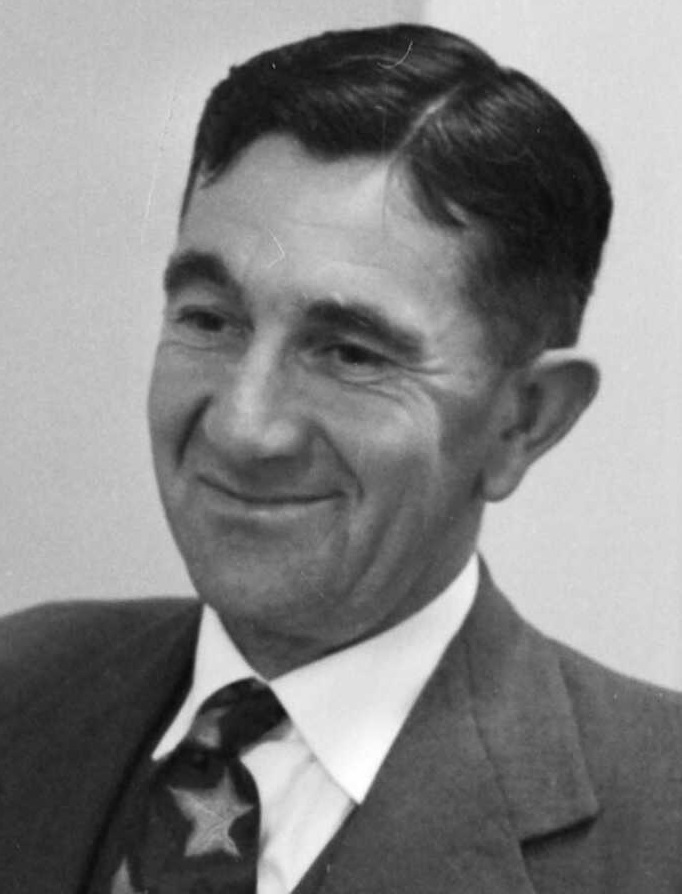

9th Minister of Broadcasting
- In office 20 December 1963 – 15 February 1967
- Prime Minister: Keith Holyoake
- Preceded by: Arthur Kinsella
- Succeeded by: Lance Adams-Schneider

30th Minister of Marine
- In office 20 December 1963 – 22 December 1969
- Prime Minister: Keith Holyoake
- Preceded by: Geoff Gerard
- Succeeded by: Allan McCready

Member of the New Zealand Parliament for Rodney
- In office 13 November 1954 – 29 November 1969
- Preceded by: Clifton Webb
- Succeeded by: Peter Wilkinson

Personal details
- Born: 9 September 1916 Te Awamutu, New Zealand
- Died: 30 October 2001 (aged 85) Hastings, New Zealand
- Party: National

William John Scott QSO (9 September 1916 – 30 October 2001), known as Jack Scott, was a New Zealand politician of the National Party.

== Biography ==
=== Early life and career ===
Scott was born in 1916 at Te Awamutu. He was known as Jack Scott. His great-grandfather, a Scot, had moved his family to New Zealand from Canada in 1865. He received his education at Kawhia and Paterangi primary schools, then Mount Albert Grammar School before he became a farmer. On leaving school, he purchased a partly-developed plot of land at Hobsonville on which he ran sheep and beef cattle.

=== Political career ===
New Zealand Parliament
Years	Term	Electorate	Party
1954–1957	31st	Rodney	National
1957–1960	32nd	Rodney	National
1960–1963	33rd	Rodney	National
1963–1966	34th	Rodney	National
1966–1969	35th	Rodney	National

In 1954 Scott was chairman of National's Rodney electorate committee when Clifton Webb was appointed to the job of high commissioner to the United Kingdom. In search of a suitable replacement candidate Scott toured the electorate to find a successor with little success. He even went as far as to personally appeal to Prime Minister Sidney Holland to delay Webb's appointment to London until after the election. Holland demurred and eventually Scott was persuaded to run. After reluctantly putting his name forward he beat 10 other nominees for the party nomination. He was elected and represented the Rodney electorate from 1954 and held it to 1969, when he retired. By 1961 he had been appointed chief government whip, a position he held until 1963.

He was a cabinet minister in the Second National Government under Keith Holyoake. He was Minister of Marine (1963–1969), Postmaster-General (1963–1969), and Minister of Broadcasting (1963–1967).

Scott was Minister of Broadcasting during the 1966 saga of the "pirate" station Radio Hauraki, which was broadcasting from the Tiri in the Hauraki Gulf, a role he was best remembered for. As minister he became the unpopular face of the "heavy handed" government when it moved to stop radio broadcasts from beyond the three-mile limit in international waters. Personally Scott was loath to intervene, believing a national government should be on the side of private enterprise, but was overruled in cabinet. In 1990 Scott helped Radio Hauraki celebrate its transition to the FM frequency. At the event he revealed that he had vainly tried to persuade the board members of the New Zealand Broadcasting Corporation to lease the station air time so that they could broadcast from land. He also confessed that he burnt a Marine Department report proposing to arrest the broadcasters stating "I wasn't going to use those sort of dirty tricks on them."

After his retirement from Parliament he remained an active National Party member, but was known to criticise the party publicly on occasion. Notably, in an article in the New Zealand Herald in 1980 he stated that the Muldoon government had become arrogant and described what Robert Muldoon called "fine-tuning the economy" as "fiddling while Rome burns".

=== Later life and career ===
He was chairman of the New Zealand Historic Places Trust (since renamed to Heritage New Zealand) from 1970 to 1973. He then sold his farm after refusing to continue paying $20,000 in rates on 160 acres to the Waitemata City Council which he deemed to be an excessive amount. Scott then became a director of several shipping companies, including North Shore Ferries until he retired.

In the 1994 Queen's Birthday Honours, Scott was appointed a Companion of the Queen's Service Order for public services.

Scott died in Hastings on 30 October 2001, aged 85. He frequently pondered over writing his memoirs, and after many years equivocating had promised friends he had set aside time to do so, but died just a week before he was set to commence.

== Notes ==
Political offices
Preceded by Arthur Kinsella	Minister of Broadcasting; 1963–1967	Succeeded by Lance Adams-Schneider
Preceded by Arthur Kinsella	Postmaster-General; 1963–1969	Succeeded by Allan McCready
Preceded by Geoff Gerard	Minister of Marine; 1963–1969	Succeeded by Allan McCready
New Zealand Parliament
Preceded by Clifton Webb	Member of Parliament for Rodney; 1954–1969	Succeeded by Peter Wilkinson
