= 34th New Zealand Parliament =

Parliament elected 30 November 1963

34th Parliament of New Zealand
←	33rd Parliament	35th Parliament	→
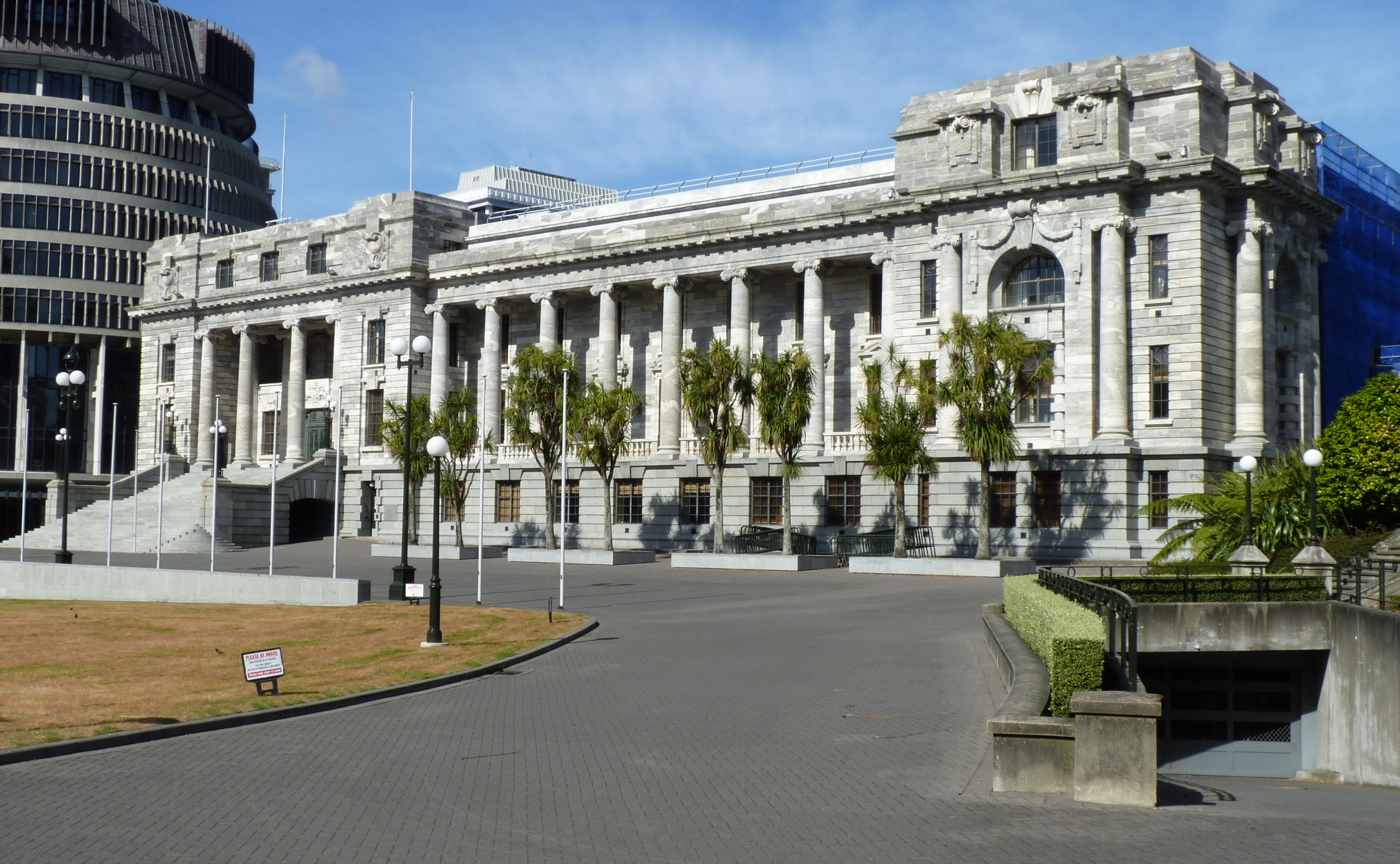
- Parliament House, Wellington

Overview
- Legislative body: New Zealand Parliament
- Term: 10 June 1964 – 29 October 1966
- Election: 1963 New Zealand general election
- Government: Second National Government

House of Representatives
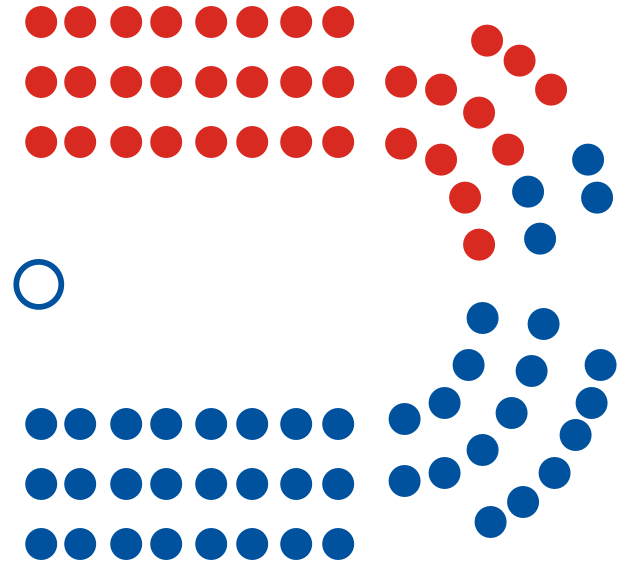
- Members: 80
- Speaker of the House: Ronald Algie
- Prime Minister: Keith Holyoake
- Leader of the Opposition: Norman Kirk — Arnold Nordmeyer until 16 December 1965

Sovereign
- Monarch: HM Elizabeth II
- Governor-General: HE Brigadier Sir Bernard Edward Fergusson

The 34th New Zealand Parliament was a term of the New Zealand Parliament. It was elected at the 1963 general election on 30 November of that year.

== 1963 general election ==
The 1963 general election was held on Saturday, 30 November. A total of 80 MPs were elected; 52 represented North Island electorates, 24 represented South Island electorates, and the remaining four represented Māori electorates; this was a gain of one electorate for the North Island from the South Island since the 1960 election. 1,345,836 voters were enrolled and the official turnout at the election was 89.6%.

== Sessions ==
The 34th Parliament sat for three sessions, and was prorogued on 21 October 1966.

Session	Opened	Adjourned
first	10 June 1964	4 December 1964
second	27 May 1965	1 November 1965
third	26 May 1966	21 October 1966

== Ministries ==
The National Party had come to power at the 1960 election, and Keith Holyoake had formed the second Holyoake Ministry on 12 December 1960, which stayed in power until Holyoake stepped down in early 1972. The second National Government remained in place until its defeat at the 1972 election towards the end of that year.

== Overview of seats ==
The table below shows the number of MPs in each party following the 1963 election and at dissolution:

Affiliation	Members	
Affiliation	At 1963 election	At dissolution
National Government	45	45
Labour Opposition	35	35
Total	80	80
Working Government majority	10	10

Notes

- The Working Government majority is calculated as all Government MPs less all other parties.

== Initial composition of the 34th Parliament ==
The table below shows the results of the 1963 general election:

Key

National Labour Social Credit

Electorate results for the 1963 New Zealand general election
Electorate	Incumbent	Winner	Majority	Runner up
General electorates
Ashburton	Geoff Gerard		3,419	Albert George Braddick
Auckland Central	Norman Douglas		3,227	John Strevens
Avon	John Mathison		5,117	Stan Dodwell
Awarua	Gordon Grieve		3,373	Noel Valentine
Bay of Plenty	Percy Allen		3,025	Peter Riden
Buller	Bill Rowling		1,671	Ernie King
Christchurch Central	Robert Macfarlane		1,915	Dave Patchett
Clutha	Peter Gordon		3,595	Les McKay
Dunedin Central	Phil Connolly	Brian MacDonell	1,170	George Robert Thorn
Dunedin North	Ethel McMillan		2,524	Edgar Whittleston
Eden	John Rae		3,335	Frank Knipe
Egmont	William Sheat		3,047	John Seddon
Fendalton	Harry Lake		2,740	Bruce Barclay
Franklin	Alfred E. Allen		5,848	Ron Ng-Waishing
Gisborne	Esme Tombleson		902	Bob MacDonald
Grey Lynn	Reginald Keeling	Ritchie Macdonald	5,240	Jolyon Firth
Hamilton	Lance Adams-Schneider		2,642	J M Cairns
Hastings	Duncan MacIntyre		1,944	Ted Keating
Hauraki	Arthur Kinsella		2,873	George Broad
Hawkes Bay	Cyril Harker	Richard Harrison	3,518	John Woolf
Heretaunga	Ron Bailey		2,135	Bob Kimmins
Hobson	Logan Sloane		31	Vernon Cracknell (Note: Vernon Cracknell was first on election night, but lost when special votes were included)
Hutt	Walter Nash		3,648	Vere Hampson-Tindale
Invercargill	Ralph Hanan		1,934	Oliver James Henderson
Island Bay	Arnold Nordmeyer		2,388	Fairlie Curry
Karori	Jack Marshall		4,020	Keith Spry
Lyttelton	Norman Kirk		2,677	Tom Flint
Manawatu	Blair Tennent		2,513	Leonard Thomas Fischer
Manukau	Leon Götz	Colin Moyle	759	Henry Christopher Pryor
Manurewa	New electorate	Phil Amos	1,524	Leon Götz
Marlborough	Tom Shand		2,111	Bill Kenyon
Marsden	Don McKay		3,942	O J Lewis
Miramar	Bill Fox		416	Bill Young
Mt Albert	Warren Freer		3,018	Jeffrey Lloyd Reid
Napier	Jim Edwards		785	D'Arcy Ormonde Haskell
Nelson	Stan Whitehead		2,610	Peter Malone
New Lynn	New electorate	Rex Mason	3,052	Charles Alexander McLeod
New Plymouth	Ernest Aderman		474	Ron Barclay
North Shore	Dean Eyre		2,757	Reginald Keeling
Onehunga	Hugh Watt		5,127	J P Mason
Otago Central	Jack George		2,675	Stan Rodger
Otaki	Allan McCready		3,014	George McDonald
Pahiatua	Keith Holyoake		5,733	Ernie Hemmingsen
Pakuranga	New electorate	Bob Tizard	2,015	Roland Neville-White
Palmerston North	Bill Brown		772	Philip Skoglund
Petone	Mick Moohan		2,448	Peter Love
Piako	Stan Goosman	Geoffrey Sim	5,526	N R D Shewan
Porirua	New electorate	Henry May	3,161	Joseph W. Miller
Raglan	Douglas Carter		1,850	Henry Uttinger
Rangiora	New electorate	Lorrie Pickering	1,425	Te Rino Tirikatene
Rangitikei	Norman Shelton		4,307	Russell Wiseman
Remuera	Ronald Algie		7,001	Frederick Nelson Goodall
Riccarton	Mick Connelly		2,550	Ian Wilson
Rodney	Jack Scott		4,320	Chris Pickett
Roskill	Arthur Faulkner		3,216	Thomas Tucker
Rotorua	Harry Lapwood		2,217	James Phillip Cranston
Selwyn	John McAlpine		3,371	Francis Edward Smith
St Albans	Bert Walker		2,501	John Palmer
St Kilda	Bill Fraser		2,597	Kevin John Marlow
Stratford	Thomas Murray	David Thomson	4,590	J McLafferty
Sydenham	Mabel Howard		5,399	Derek Quigley
Tamaki	Robert Muldoon		3,754	Norman Finch
Taupo	New electorate	Rona Stevenson	275	Jack Ingram
Tauranga	George Walsh		4,545	Gordon Hardaker
Timaru	Sir Basil Arthur		2,831	Maurice John O'Reilly
Waimarino	New electorate	Roy Jack	1,785	Olive Smuts-Kennedy
Waipa	Hallyburton Johnstone	Leslie Munro	3,165	Ronald Nelson Little
Wairarapa	Bert Cooksley	Haddon Donald	501	Jack Williams
Waitaki	Allan Dick		2,019	K S Lysaght
Waitakere	Rex Mason	Martyn Finlay	2,895	Horace Alexander Nash
Waitemata	Norman King		2,919	Butch Pugh
Waitomo	David Seath		4,655	H C Brown
Wallace	Brian Talboys		5,740	John Reid
Wanganui	George Spooner		1,397	John Grace
Wellington Central	Dan Riddiford		1,508	Frank Kitts
Westland	Paddy Blanchfield		4,925	Winston Reynolds
Māori electorates
Eastern Maori	Tiaki Omana	Puti Tipene Watene	2,566	Arnold Reedy
Northern Maori	Matiu Rata		2,123	James Henare
Southern Maori	Eruera Tirikatene		4,978	Ben Couch
Western Maori	Iriaka Rātana		5,096	Pei Te Hurinui Jones

The 34th Parliament was the first term of parliament during which there were no by-elections held.
