= 1869 Marsden by-election =

New Zealand by-election

The 1869 Marsden by-election was a by-election held on 25 January 1869 during the 4th New Zealand Parliament in the Northland electorate of Marsden.

The by-election was caused by the resignation of the incumbent MP Francis Hull on 14 December 1878.

The by-election was won by John Munro. As there were no other candidates, he was declared elected unopposed on 25 January; the papers published several reports of his speeches.
