= Don McKay (politician) =

New Zealand politician (1908–1988)

The Honourable Sir Don McKay KCMG
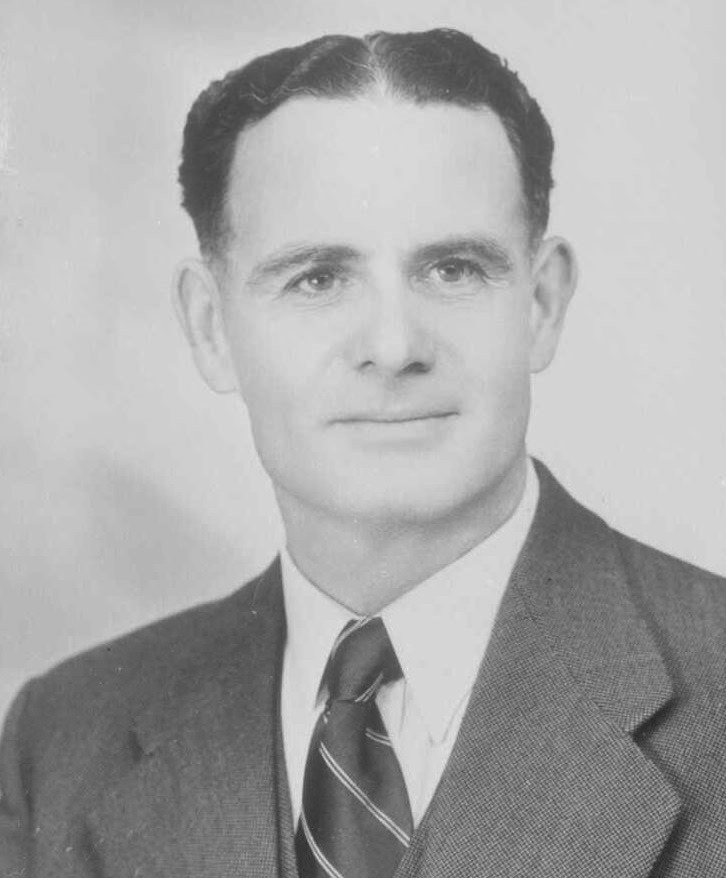

20th Minister of Health
- In office 24 January 1962 – 9 February 1972
- Prime Minister: Keith Holyoake
- Preceded by: Norman Shelton
- Succeeded by: Lance Adams-Schneider

11th Minister of Social Security
- In office 24 January 1962 – 9 February 1972
- Prime Minister: Keith Holyoake
- Preceded by: Norman Shelton
- Succeeded by: Lance Adams-Schneider

Member of the New Zealand Parliament for Marsden
- In office 13 November 1954 – 25 November 1972
- Preceded by: Alfred Murdoch
- Succeeded by: Constituency abolished

Personal details
- Born: 28 November 1908 Waipu, New Zealand
- Died: 30 March 1988 (aged 79) Waipu, New Zealand
- Party: National
- Spouse: Miriam Hilda Stehr
- Children: 3

Sir Donald Norman McKay KCMG (28 November 1908 – 30 March 1988) was a New Zealand politician of the National Party. He was Minister of Health and Minister of Social Security in the Second National Government, and was also the Minister for the Welfare of Women and Children.

== Biography ==
=== Early life and career ===
McKay was born in 1908 in Waipu. He received his education from Whangārei Boys' High School and the University of Auckland. At Whangārei Boys' High School he was head prefect, captain of the first XI cricket team and captain of the first XV rugby team. Another student at the same school was future parliamentary colleague Jack Marshall who described McKay as his schoolboy hero. He then became a farmer in Waipu. He married Miriam Hilda Stehr in 1934 with whom he had 3 children.

=== Member of Parliament ===
New Zealand Parliament
Years	Term	Electorate	Party
1954–1957	31st	Marsden	National
1957–1960	32nd	Marsden	National
1960–1963	33rd	Marsden	National
1963–1966	34th	Marsden	National
1966–1969	35th	Marsden	National
1969–1972	36th	Marsden	National

McKay joined the National Party and became the chairman of the Marsden electorate committee. In early 1954 the 77 year-old MP for Marsden Alfred Murdoch was challenged for the National nomination by William Rodney Lewin Vallance, the deputy mayor of Whangarei. Vallance won a postal ballot of members, an outcome which split the Marsden National Party membership into two opposing factions. After it emerged that Vallance was in trouble with his taxes he was in turn deselected and replaced by McKay. Vallance ran as an independent candidate and split the vote, almost costing National the seat.

He represented the Marsden electorate in the Northland region from 1954, and he retired in 1972. He was Minister of Health and Minister of Social Security in the Second National Government from 1962 to 1972 under Keith Holyoake. He was also the Minister for the Welfare of Women and Children.

Following National's victory in 1960, Deputy Prime Minister Jack Marshall was unable to convince Keith Holyoake to include McKay in the cabinet. Holyoake thought that McKay had not sufficiently proved himself in the house, but later appointed him following a midterm vacancy based on Marshall's endorsement.

=== Later life and death ===
After retiring from Parliament, he was elected a member of the Northland Harbour Board and served one term as its chairman.

McKay was appointed a Knight Commander of the Order of St Michael and St George, for public services, in the 1978 Queen's Birthday Honours, and died in 1988.

== Notes ==
Political offices
Preceded by Norman Shelton	Minister of Health; 1962–1972	Succeeded by Lance Adams-Schneider
Preceded by Norman Shelton	Minister of Social Security; 1962–1972	Succeeded by Lance Adams-Schneider
New Zealand Parliament
Preceded by Alfred Murdoch	Member of Parliament for Marsden; 1954–1972	Constituency abolished
