= Arthur Kinsella =

New Zealand politician

The Honourable Arthur Kinsella QSO
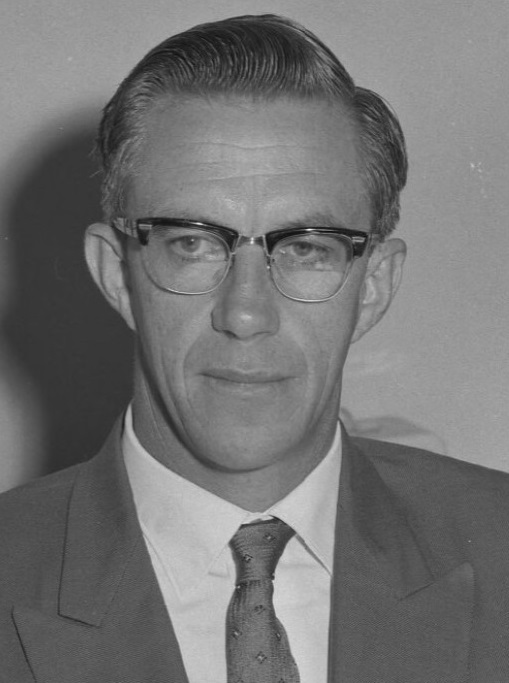

28th Minister of Education
- In office 20 December 1963 – 22 December 1969
- Prime Minister: Keith Holyoake
- Preceded by: Blair Tennent
- Succeeded by: Brian Talboys

38th Postmaster-General
- In office 2 May 1961 – 20 December 1963
- Prime Minister: Keith Holyoake
- Preceded by: Thomas Hayman
- Succeeded by: Jack Scott

8th Minister of Broadcasting
- In office 12 December 1960 – 20 December 1963
- Prime Minister: Keith Holyoake
- Preceded by: Ray Boord
- Succeeded by: Jack Scott

Member of the New Zealand Parliament for Hauraki
- In office 13 November 1954 – 29 November 1969
- Preceded by: Andy Sutherland
- Succeeded by: Leo Schultz

Personal details
- Born: 15 January 1918 Waikino, New Zealand
- Died: 4 March 2004 (aged 86) Paraparaumu, New Zealand
- Party: National
- Children: 4

Arthur Ellis Kinsella QSO (15 January 1918 – 4 March 2004) was a New Zealand politician of the National Party, and was a cabinet minister.

== Biography ==
=== Early life ===
Kinsella was born at Waikino in 1918. He was educated at Waihi District High School, Waihi School of Mines, University of Auckland, Victoria University of Wellington and Auckland Teachers College; he graduated with MA and Diploma in Education. He was a farmer and teacher before becoming an MP.

In World War II he served with NZ Engineer Forces (7th Field Company) in UK, Middle East and Greece where he was wounded and returned to New Zealand.

=== Political career ===
New Zealand Parliament
Years	Term	Electorate	Party
1954–1957	31st	Hauraki	National
1957–1960	32nd	Hauraki	National
1960–1963	33rd	Hauraki	National
1963–1966	34th	Hauraki	National
1966–1969	35th	Hauraki	National

Kinsella was elected as the Member of the rural electorate of Hauraki in the 1954 election. He was Minister of Broadcasting (1960–1963) in the second National Government under Keith Holyoake, overseeing the introduction of Television to New Zealand. He was Postmaster-General (1961–1963), and was Minister of Education (1963–1969). He retired from Parliament in 1969 following a bad car crash.

As a minister he enabled private stations on radio and television (rather than limit them to direct state stewardship) via the Broadcasting Corporation amendment bill. He also faced a chronic shortage of telephones in New Zealand with a waiting list of 19,000 in the early 1960s. He lengthened the teacher training period from two years to three and attempted to reduce class sizes. He also established a new medical school in Auckland.

In 1970 Kinsella was granted the right to retain the title of The Honourable for life. In 1971 Kinsella was elected to the Auckland City Council serving one term. Later, in 1983 he was elected to the Wellington City Council He lost his seat three years later but regained a seat following a 1987 by-election.

=== Later life and death ===
After his retirement from politics, he was a business consultant before his return to teaching as Principal of the Technical Correspondence Institute.

In the 1992 New Year Honours, Kinsella was appointed a Companion of the Queen's Service Order for public services.

Kinsella died in 2004.

== Notes ==
New Zealand Parliament
Preceded by Andy Sutherland	Member of Parliament for Hauraki; 1954–1969	Succeeded by Leo Schultz
Political offices
Preceded by Ray Boord	Minister of Broadcasting; 1960–1963	Succeeded by Jack Scott
Preceded by Thomas Hayman	Postmaster-General; 1961–1963	Succeeded by Jack Scott
Preceded by Blair Tennent	Minister of Education; 1963–1969	Succeeded by Brian Talboys
Preceded by Gavin Wilson	Wellington City Councillor for Karori Ward; 1987–1989	Ward abolished
