= Minister of Marine (New Zealand) =

New Zealand minister of the Crown

The Minister of Marine in New Zealand was a former cabinet member appointed by the Prime Minister to be responsible for New Zealand's marine transport, aquaculture and fishing industries and in charge of the New Zealand Marine Department. The portfolio was abolished in 1972 with responsibilities split between the Minister of Transport (marine transport) and Minister of Agriculture (aquaculture and fishing). Similar duties are performed today by the Minister of Transport and Minister of Fisheries.

== List of ministers ==
The following ministers held the office of Minister of Marine.

Key

Independent Liberal Reform United Labour National

No.	Name	Portrait	Term of Office		Prime Minister
1	George Grey		9 April 1878	10 October 1879	Grey
2	Harry Atkinson		10 October 1879	21 April 1882	Hall
3	George Morris		20 August 1884	28 August 1884	Stout
4	William Larnach		5 January 1885	9 August 1887	Stout
5	Julius Vogel		9 August 1887	8 October 1887	Stout
(2)	Harry Atkinson		8 October 1887	24 January 1891	Atkinson
6	Richard Seddon		3 June 1892	1 May 1893	Ballance
7	Patrick Buckley		1 May 1893	13 October 1893	Seddon
8	Joseph Ward		13 October 1893	16 June 1896	Seddon
9	William Hall-Jones		16 June 1896	6 August 1906	Seddon
9	William Hall-Jones		16 June 1896	6 August 1906	Hall-Jones
10	John A. Millar		6 August 1906	28 March 1912	Ward
11	George Laurenson		28 March 1912	10 July 1912	Mackenzie
12	Francis Fisher		10 July 1912	7 January 1915	Massey
13	William Herries		19 February 1915	12 August 1915	Massey
14	Robert McNab		12 August 1915	3 February 1917†	Massey
15	George Warren Russell		20 August 1917	14 November 1917	Massey
16	Thomas Wilford		14 November 1917	22 August 1919	Massey
(13)	William Herries		4 September 1919	7 February 1921	Massey
17	Francis Bell		1 March 1921	21 February 1922	Massey
18	George Anderson		21 February 1922	24 August 1928	Massey
18	George Anderson		21 February 1922	24 August 1928	Bell
18	George Anderson		21 February 1922	24 August 1928	Coates
(17)	Francis Bell		24 August 1928	10 December 1928	Coates
19	John Cobbe		10 December 1928	28 May 1930	Ward
20	James Donald		28 May 1930	22 September 1931	Forbes
(19)	John Cobbe		22 September 1931	6 December 1935	Forbes
21	Peter Fraser		6 December 1935	30 April 1940	Savage
21	Peter Fraser		6 December 1935	30 April 1940	Fraser
22	Bob Semple		30 April 1940	12 June 1940	Fraser
23	Gervan McMillan		12 June 1940	21 January 1941	Fraser
(22)	Bob Semple		21 January 1941	19 December 1942	Fraser
24	James O'Brien		19 December 1942	28 September 1947	Fraser
25	Fred Hackett		28 September 1947	13 December 1949	Fraser
26	Stan Goosman		13 December 1949	26 November 1954	Holland
27	John McAlpine		26 November 1954	13 February 1957	Holland
28	Geoff Gerard		13 February 1957	12 December 1957	Holland
28	Geoff Gerard		13 February 1957	12 December 1957	Holyoake
29	Bill Fox		12 December 1957	12 December 1960	Nash
(27)	John McAlpine		12 December 1960	2 May 1961	Holyoake
(28)	Geoff Gerard		2 May 1961	20 December 1963	Holyoake
30	Jack Scott		20 December 1963	22 December 1969	Holyoake
31	Allan McCready		22 December 1969	9 February 1972	Holyoake
32	Peter Gordon		9 February 1972	8 December 1972	Marshall

== See also ==
- Aquaculture in New Zealand
- Fishing industry in New Zealand
