= Edward Gordon (New Zealand politician) =

New Zealand politician (1885–1964)

Edward Brice Killen Gordon (4 November 1885 – 6 September 1964) was a New Zealand politician of the National Party.

== Biography ==
New Zealand Parliament
Years	Term	Electorate	Party
1938–1943	26th	Rangitikei	National
1943–1946	27th	Rangitikei	National
1946–1949	28th	Rangitikei	National
1949–1951	29th	Rangitikei	National
1951–1954	30th	Rangitikei	National

Gordon was born in Marton in 1885. His father was a Presbytarian minister. He received his education at Marton District High School and at Prince Albert College in Auckland's Queen Street. He worked on a farm near Taihape, and then in the bush north of Wanganui. During his 20s, he became a member of his local road board.

In 1917, he married Mary Alexandra Grant before enlisting for World War I; at the time, they were living in Palmerston North. They had six children. After the war, he purchased a farm near Mangaweka, but moved back to Marton to take over a farm there. He was involved with various farming organisations and chaired the Marton branch of the Farmers' Union, was vice-president of the Marton A&P Association, and a member of the Rangitikei Rabbit Board.

With the formation of the National Party in 1936, he became the electorate chairman for Rangitikei. In the 1938 election, Gordon stood against the incumbent in the Rangitikei electorate, Labour's Ormond Wilson. Boundary changes had resulted in the loss of the urban part of Wanganui from the electorate, which was now fully rural. Although Labour obtained a landslide victory in the election, Wilson lost against Gordon of the National Party by 300 votes. In 1953, Gordon was awarded the Queen Elizabeth II Coronation Medal.

Gordon held the Rangitikei electorate to 1954, when he retired. He died on 6 September 1964 at Wanganui.

== Notes ==
New Zealand Parliament
Preceded by Ormond Wilson	Member of Parliament for Rangitikei; 1938–1954	Succeeded by Norman Shelton
