= Robert Thompson (New Zealand politician) =

New Zealand politician

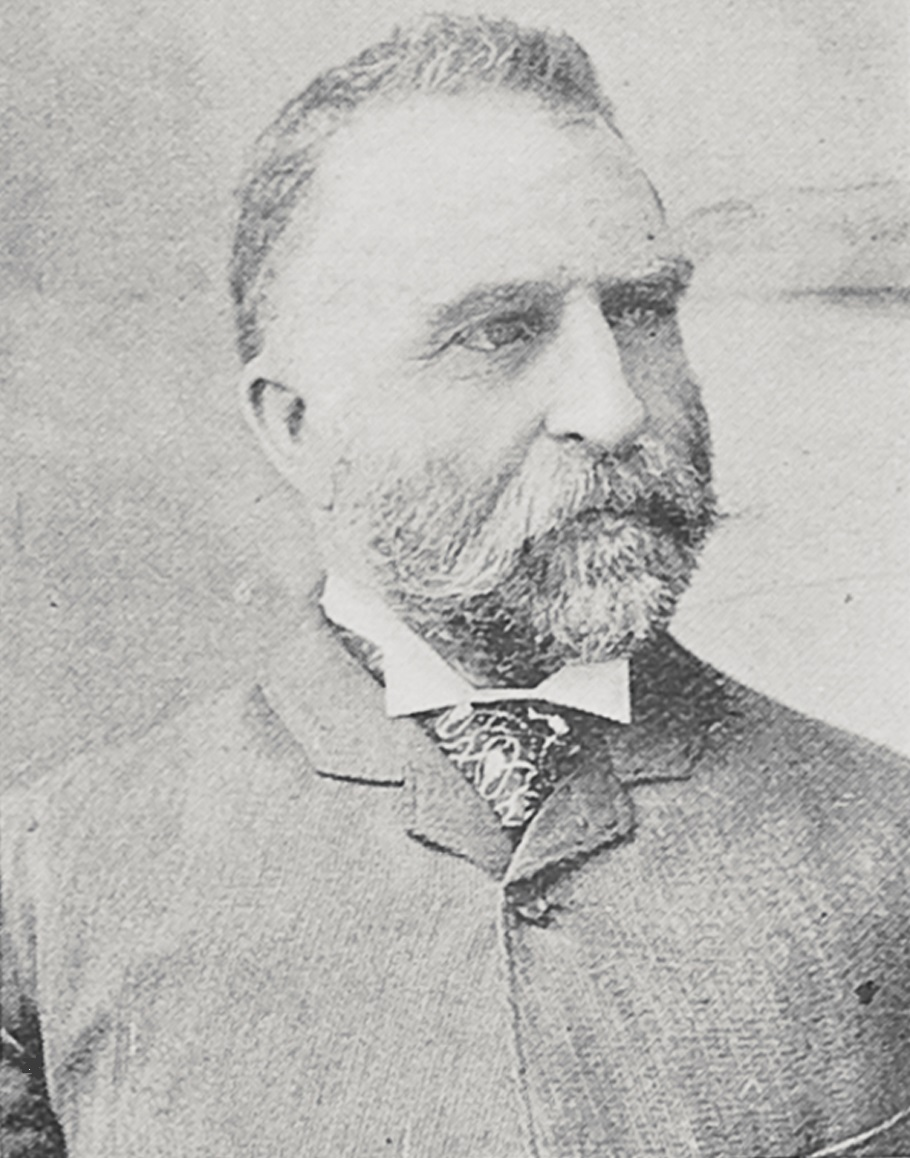

Member of the New Zealand Parliament for Marsden
- In office 1887–1902
- Preceded by: Edwin Mitchelson
- Succeeded by: Francis Mander

Personal details
- Born: 1840 Newtownbutler, Ireland
- Died: 21 April 1922 (aged 81–82) Whangārei, New Zealand
- Party: Liberal
- Spouse: Mary Catherine Aubrey

Robert Thompson (1840 – 21 April 1922) was a Member of Parliament for Marsden, in Northland, New Zealand.

== Early life ==
Born at Newtownbutler, County Fermanagh, Thompson migrated to New South Wales in 1864, and New Zealand in 1870. He was a commission agent and auctioneer in Whangārei.

He married Mary Catherine Aubrey, eldest daughter of Harcourt Richard Aubrey, Resident Magistrate for Kaipara and Whangārei, in 1879.

== Member of Parliament ==
New Zealand Parliament
Years	Term	Electorate	Party
1887–1890	10th	Marsden	Independent
1890–1893	11th	Marsden	Conservative
1893–1896	12th	Marsden	Liberal
1896–1899	13th	Marsden	Independent
1899–1902	14th	Marsden	Independent Liberal

Robert Thompson represented Marsden in the House of Representatives for fifteen years from 1887 to 1902.

According to Wilson, he changed his political allegiance; initially a Conservative he was a Liberal in 1893, but in 1896 was Independent and in 1899 was an Independent Liberal but was not part of the governing Liberal Government.

He acquired the labels 'Marsden Thompson' and 'the member for roads and bridges' in Parliament. He was known for his devotion to the interests of his district, which was desperately in need of good roads, and his only reason for being a Liberal was that the government was the only source of funding for roads and bridges. He was pro-freehold (land), and was opposed to Liberal policies such as labour legislation and old age pensions. In 1908, when he stood unsuccessfully for Auckland West against a sitting Liberal member, he was once more an independent, and his programme – freehold (land), acquisition of Maori land and opposition to prohibition had not altered.

== Death ==
He died on 21 April 1922 at his residence, Pentland House, in Whangārei, and was buried at Kamo. His wife had died some 18 years before him. He was survived by one daughter.

New Zealand Parliament
Preceded by Edwin Mitchelson	Member of Parliament for Marsden; 1887–1902	Succeeded by Francis Mander
