= John Munro (New Zealand politician born c. 1798) =

New Zealand politician

John Munro (1798/99 – 24 April 1879) was a 19th-century Member of Parliament in the Auckland Province, New Zealand.

He was described as "an old Nova Scotia settler" of Waipu.

== Biography ==
New Zealand Parliament
| Years | Term | Electorate | Party |
|---|---|---|---|
| 1861–1866 | 3rd | Marsden | Independent |
| 1869–1870 | 4th | Marsden | Independent |
| 1871–1875 | 5th | Marsden | Independent |

He represented the Marsden electorate from 1861 to 1866, when he was defeated. He then represented the electorate again from a by-election in 1869 to 1875, when he was again defeated.

He died on 24 April 1879, aged 80 years.

New Zealand Parliament
| Preceded by James Farmer | Member of Parliament for Marsden; 1861–1866; 1869–1876 | Succeeded by Francis Hull |
| Preceded by Francis Hull | Member of Parliament for Marsden; 1861–1866; 1869–1876 | Succeeded by Robert Douglas |
