= Lance Adams-Schneider =

New Zealand politician

The Right Honourable Sir Lance Adams-Schneider KCMG PC
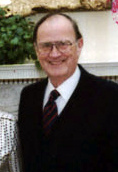
- Adams-Schneider in 1982

9th Ambassador to the United States
- In office 18 May 1982 – 5 March 1985
- Prime Minister: Robert Muldoon; David Lange
- Preceded by: Frank Gill
- Succeeded by: Bill Rowling

3rd Minister of Trade and Industry
- In office 12 December 1975 – 11 December 1981
- Prime Minister: Robert Muldoon
- Preceded by: Warren Freer
- Succeeded by: Hugh Templeton

21st Minister of Health
- In office 9 February 1972 – 8 December 1972
- Prime Minister: Jack Marshall
- Preceded by: Don McKay
- Succeeded by: Bob Tizard

42nd Minister of Customs
- In office 12 December 1969 – 9 February 1972
- Prime Minister: Keith Holyoake
- Preceded by: Norman Shelton
- Succeeded by: George Gair

10th Minister of Broadcasting
- In office 15 February 1967 – 12 December 1969
- Prime Minister: Keith Holyoake
- Preceded by: Jack Scott
- Succeeded by: Bert Walker

Member of the New Zealand Parliament for Waikato
- In office 29 November 1969 – 28 November 1981
- Succeeded by: Simon Upton

Member of the New Zealand Parliament for Hamilton
- In office 2 May 1959 – 29 November 1969
- Preceded by: Hilda Ross

Personal details
- Born: Lancelot Raymond Adams; 11 November 1919 Wellington, New Zealand
- Died: 3 September 1995 (aged 75)
- Party: National
- Spouse: Shirley Lois Brunton
- Children: Two sons, one daughter
- Occupation: Retailer

Sir Lancelot Raymond Adams-Schneider KCMG PC (11 November 1919 – 3 September 1995) was a New Zealand politician of the National Party.

== Early life and career ==
Lancelot Raymond Adams was born in Wellington, New Zealand, to Arthur Archibald Adams and Hilda Mary Adams (née Biggs). His mother died when he was three years old, and his paternal aunt, Susan Isabella Schneider (née Adams) took on the care of her nephew. Later, Susan and her husband, Theodore Schneider, adopted Lancelot and he became Lance Adams-Schneider. He was educated at Eastern Hutt Primary School, Petone Memorial Technical College, and Mount Albert Grammar School, Auckland.

He entered the drapery trade on leaving school and founded his own business in Auckland. Later he managed a large store in Taumarunui. During World War II, Adams-Schneider served in the Medical Corps. He later became a member of the Taumarunui Borough Council, president of the Chamber of Commerce, and an executive member of the New Zealand Retailers' Association.

In 1944, Adams-Schneider became engaged to Shirley Lois Brunton, and the couple married the following year.

== Political career ==
New Zealand Parliament
| Years | Term | Electorate | Party |
|---|---|---|---|
| 1959–1960 | 32nd | Hamilton | National |
| 1960–1963 | 33rd | Hamilton | National |
| 1963–1966 | 34th | Hamilton | National |
| 1966–1969 | 35th | Hamilton | National |
| 1969–1972 | 36th | Waikato | National |
| 1972–1975 | 37th | Waikato | National |
| 1975–1978 | 38th | Waikato | National |
| 1978–1981 | 39th | Waikato | National |

His private enterprise position and retail experience influenced him politically and led him to become involved with the National Party. He became chairmans of the party's Taumaranui Branch and was later a publicity officer for the party's Waikato Division. He later sought the National Party nomination at a by-election in Bay of Plenty in early 1957, but was unsuccessful.

Adams-Schneider stood in the Hutt electorate against Labour Party leader Walter Nash in 1957, coming second for National. He then contested and won for National the 1959 Hamilton by-election held after the death of the incumbent MP, Dame Hilda Ross. He continued to represent the Hamilton electorate until its disestablishment in 1969, after which he represented the Waikato electorate until his retirement in 1981.

Adams-Schneider was a parliamentary under-secretary from 1964 to 1967, Minister of Broadcasting from 1967 to 1969, Minister of Customs from 1969 to 1972, Minister of Health and Minister of Social Welfare in 1972, and Minister of Trade and Industry from 1975 to 1981.

He was awarded the Queen Elizabeth II Silver Jubilee Medal in 1977, and the New Zealand 1990 Commemoration Medal.

== Diplomatic career ==
Following his retirement from national politics, Adams-Schneider was appointed the Ambassador from New Zealand to the United States (1982–85) and to Mexico (1982–83).

In the 1984 Queen's Birthday Honours, Adams-Schneider was appointed a Knight Commander of the Order of St Michael and St George, for public services. He was also a member of the Privy Council of the United Kingdom.

== Later life and death ==
Adams-Schneider was active in youth work and was a lay preacher in the Baptist Church.

He died on 3 September 1995. His wife, Shirley, Lady Adams-Schneider, died in Wellington on 20 May 2020.

Political offices
| Preceded by Don McKay | Minister of Health; 1972 | Succeeded by Bob Tizard |
| Preceded by Norman Shelton | Minister of Customs; 1969-1972 | Succeeded by George Gair |
| Preceded by Warren Freer | Minister of Trade and Industry; 1975–1981 | Succeeded by Hugh Templeton |
Diplomatic posts
| Preceded by Frank Gill | Ambassador to Mexico; 1982–1983 | Succeeded by Peter Fairfax |
| Preceded by Frank Gill | Ambassador to the United States; 1982–1985 | Succeeded by Bill Rowling |
New Zealand Parliament
| Preceded by Hilda Ross | Member of Parliament for Hamilton; 1959–1969 | Constituency abolished |
| Vacant Constituency recreated after abolition in 1963 Title last held by Geoffrey Sim | Member of Parliament for Waikato; 1969–1981 | Succeeded by Simon Upton |
