= Roy Jack =

New Zealand politician

The Honourable Sir Roy Jack
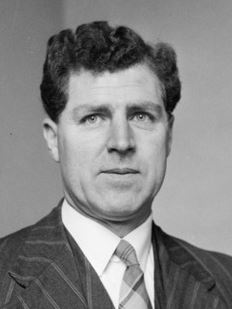
- Roy Jack in 1959

16th Speaker of the House of Representatives
- In office 22 June 1976 – 24 December 1977†
- Prime Minister: Robert Muldoon
- Preceded by: Stan Whitehead
- Succeeded by: Richard Harrison
- In office 26 April 1967 – 9 February 1972
- Prime Minister: Keith Holyoake; Jack Marshall
- Preceded by: Ronald Algie
- Succeeded by: Alfred E. Allen

22nd Attorney-General
- In office 9 February 1972 – 8 December 1972
- Prime Minister: Jack Marshall
- Preceded by: Dan Riddiford
- Succeeded by: Martyn Finlay

35th Minister of Justice
- In office 9 February 1972 – 8 December 1972
- Prime Minister: Jack Marshall
- Preceded by: Dan Riddiford
- Succeeded by: Martyn Finlay

Member of the New Zealand Parliament for Rangitīkei
- In office 25 November 1972 – 24 December 1977†
- Preceded by: Norman Shelton
- Succeeded by: Bruce Beetham

Member of the New Zealand Parliament for Waimarino Patea (1954–1963)
- In office 13 November 1954 – 25 November 1972
- Preceded by: William Sheat
- Succeeded by: Electorate abolished

Deputy Mayor of Wanganui
- In office 1947–1955

Personal details
- Born: Roy Emile Jack; 12 January 1914 New Plymouth, New Zealand
- Died: 24 December 1977 (aged 63) Wellington, New Zealand
- Party: National
- Education: Victoria University of Wellington

Military service
- Allegiance: New Zealand
- Branch/service: Royal New Zealand Air Force
- Years of service: 1939–1945
- Rank: Flight lieutenant

Sir Roy Emile Jack (12 January 1914 – 24 December 1977) was a New Zealand politician of the National Party. He was a cabinet minister and Speaker of the House of Representatives.

== Biography ==
=== Early life and career ===
Jack was born in New Plymouth in 1914. He was educated at Wanganui Collegiate School and graduated from the Victoria University with an LLB. Jack was a Judge's Associate from 1935 to 1938, before enlisting with the Royal New Zealand Air Force during World War Two. He was first elected onto Wanganui City Council in 1946 and was deputy mayor in the following year. He served on the city council until 1955.

=== Member of Parliament ===
New Zealand Parliament
Years	Term	Electorate	Party
1954–1957	31st	Patea	National
1957–1960	32nd	Patea	National
1960–1963	33rd	Patea	National
1963–1966	34th	Waimarino	National
1966–1969	35th	Waimarino	National
1969–1972	36th	Waimarino	National
1972–1975	37th	Rangitikei	National
1975–1977	38th	Rangitikei	National

He represented the electorate of Patea from 1954 to 1963, then Waimarino from 1963 to 1972, then Rangitikei from 1972 to 1977 when he died.

The Waimarino electorate became Rangitikei because of post-census boundary changes before the 1972 election, and though a sitting MP he was challenged by Ruth Richardson (who he had advised about a career in politics). George Chapman who chaired the selection said that "the tensions were tremendous, but Roy was finally confirmed as the candidate." He had an election-night majority of 2067 in 1972, down from Shelton's 1969 majority of 4214.

In the 1972 Marshall Ministry of the last year of the Second National Government, he was Attorney-General and Minister of Justice. He was Chairman of Committees between 1961 and 1966. He was Speaker of the House of Representatives from 1967 to 1972 and 1976 to 1977.

=== Death ===
Jack underwent surgery in August 1977. He did not resume his parliamentary duties after this operation but stayed in his apartment in Parliament Buildings. He died in 1977 on Christmas Eve in his apartment with his family by his side.

=== Honours ===
In the 1970 Queen's Birthday Honours, Jack was appointed a Knight Bachelor, for outstanding services as Speaker of the House of Representatives. In 1977, he was awarded the Queen Elizabeth II Silver Jubilee Medal.

== Notes ==
Political offices
Preceded by Reginald Keeling	Chairman of Committees of the House of Representatives; 1961–1966	Succeeded by Jack George
Preceded by Ronald Algie	Speaker of the New Zealand House of Representatives; 1967–1972; 1976–1977	Succeeded by Alfred Allen
Preceded by Stan Whitehead	Speaker of the New Zealand House of Representatives; 1967–1972; 1976–1977	Succeeded by Richard Harrison
Preceded by Dan Riddiford	Minister of Justice; 1972	Succeeded by Martyn Finlay
Preceded by Dan Riddiford	Attorney-General; 1972	Succeeded by Martyn Finlay
New Zealand Parliament
Preceded by William Sheat	Member of Parliament for Patea; 1954–1963	Constituency abolished
In abeyance Title last held by Paddy Kearins	Member of Parliament for Waimarino; 1963–1972	Constituency abolished
Preceded by Norman Shelton	Member of Parliament for Rangitikei; 1972–1977	Succeeded by Bruce Beetham
