= Alfred Murdoch =

New Zealand politician (1877–1960)

The Honourable Alfred Murdoch
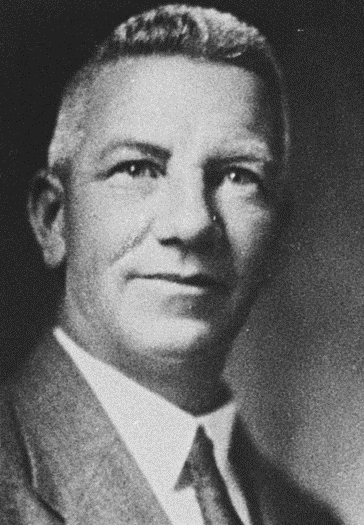

Member of the New Zealand Parliament for Marsden
- In office 7 December 1922 – 4 November 1925
- Preceded by: Francis Mander
- Succeeded by: William Jones
- In office 14 November 1928 – 27 November 1935
- Preceded by: William Jones
- Succeeded by: Jim Barclay
- In office 25 September 1943 – 13 November 1954
- Preceded by: Jim Barclay
- Succeeded by: Don McKay

Personal details
- Born: 18 April 1877 Onehunga, New Zealand
- Died: 1 June 1960 (aged 83) New Zealand
- Party: Liberal (1919–28); United (1928–36); National (1936–60)

Alfred James (Fred) Murdoch (18 April 1877 – 1 June 1960) was a New Zealand politician, first as an Independent Liberal then of the United Party, and from 1943 the National Party. He was Minister of Agriculture and Minister of Mines from 1930 to 1931 in the United Government of New Zealand.

== Biography ==
=== Early life ===
Murdoch was born in 1877 in Onehunga. He trained as a school teacher and taught at Onehunga, Northcote, Hikurangi, Mata, and Ruataka. He retired from teaching in 1919 and became a farmer, breeding Jersey cattle. For a time, he was the chairman of the New Zealand Dairy Board, and he belonged to the Chamber of Commerce in Whangārei.

=== Political career ===
New Zealand Parliament
Years	Term	Electorate	Party
1922–1925	21st	Marsden	Independent Liberal
1928–1931	23rd	Marsden	United
1931–1935	24th	Marsden	United
1943–1946	27th	Marsden	National
1946–1949	28th	Marsden	National
1949–1951	29th	Marsden	National
1951–1954	30th	Marsden	National

Murdoch unsuccessfully contested the Marsden electorate in the 1919 election as an independent Liberal against the incumbent from the Reform Party, Francis Mander. Mander retired at the 1922 election, and Murdoch was elected. At the next election in 1925, Murdoch was defeated by William Jones of the Reform Party, but he defeated Jones in turn in 1928 when he stood for the United Party. Murdoch was Minister of Agriculture, and Minister of Mines, in the United Government under George Forbes from May 1930 to September 1931.

After two parliamentary terms, Murdoch was defeated in 1935 by Jim Barclay of the Labour Party. In 1943, Murdoch, now standing for the National Party, defeated Barclay and won the electorate back, and held it until he was deselected ahead of the 1954 election.

In 1953, Murdoch was awarded the Queen Elizabeth II Coronation Medal.

In early 1954, the 77-year-old Murdoch was challenged for the National nomination by William Rodney Lewin Vallance, the deputy mayor of Whangarei. Vallance won a postal ballot of members, an outcome which split the Marsden National Party into two feuding factions. After it emerged that Vallance was in trouble with his taxes he was in turn deselected and replaced by Don McKay, the chairman of the Marsden electorate committee. Vallance ran as an independent candidate and split the vote, almost costing National the seat. Murdoch was only the second sitting National MP to not win reselection.

Murdoch died in 1960.

== Notes ==
New Zealand Parliament
Preceded by Francis Mander	Member of Parliament for Marsden; 1922–1925 1928–1935 1943–1954	Succeeded by William Jones
Preceded by William Jones	Member of Parliament for Marsden; 1922–1925 1928–1935 1943–1954	Succeeded by Jim Barclay
Preceded by Jim Barclay	Member of Parliament for Marsden; 1922–1925 1928–1935 1943–1954	Succeeded by Don McKay
Party political offices
Preceded by Alfred Ransom	Senior Whip of the Liberal Party; 1928–1930 1931–1936	Succeeded by George Munns
Preceded by George Munns	Senior Whip of the Liberal Party; 1928–1930 1931–1936	Party disestablished
