= William Jones (New Zealand politician) =

New Zealand politician

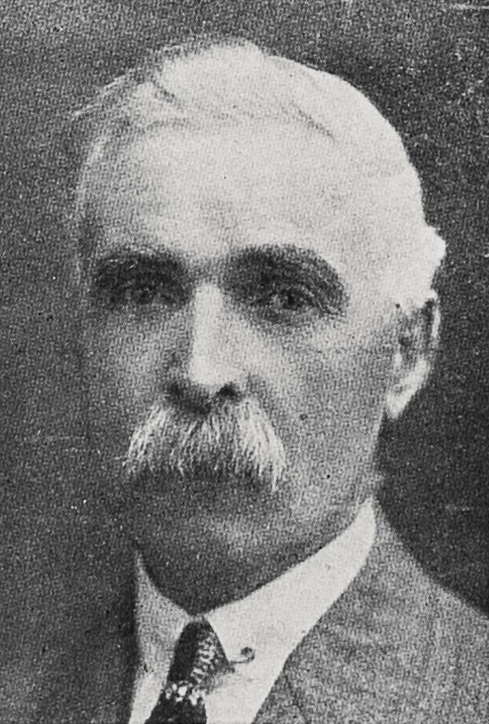
William Jones

New Zealand Parliament
Years	Term	Electorate	Party
1925–1928	22nd	Marsden	Reform

William Jones MBE (1868–1953) was a Reform Party Member of Parliament in New Zealand.

He won the Northland electorate of Marsden in the 1925 general election, defeating Alfred Murdoch, but was defeated by Murdoch in the next general election in 1928.

In the 1946 New Year Honours Jones was appointed a Member of the Order of the British Empire in recognition of his services as mayor of Whangarei and chairman of the Provincial Patriotic Council in that region.

New Zealand Parliament
Preceded by Alfred Murdoch	Member of Parliament for Marsden; 1925–1928	Succeeded by Alfred Murdoch
