= Francis Mander =

New Zealand politician

New Zealand Parliament
| Years | Term | Electorate | Party |
|---|---|---|---|
| 1902–1905 | 15th | Marsden | Independent |
| 1905–1908 | 16th | Marsden | Independent |
| 1908–1909 | 17th | Marsden | Independent |
| 1909–1911 | Changed allegiance to: | | Reform |
| 1911–1914 | 18th | Marsden | Reform |
| 1914–1919 | 19th | Marsden | Reform |
| 1919–1922 | 20th | Marsden | Reform |

Francis Mander (1849 – 27 August 1942) was a member of parliament in New Zealand, first as an Independent Conservative and then, from 1909, as a Reform Party member.

He won the Marsden electorate in Northland in the 1902 general election, and held it until 1922, when he retired.

He was appointed to the Legislative Council in 1923, and served on it to 1930.

In business he was a pioneer sawmiller and owner of The Northern Chronicle newspaper, based in Whangarei. He then purchased a popular newspaper, The Northern Advocate, and closed the Chronicle.

He was the father of the notable New Zealand novelist and journalist, Jane Mander, and a descendant of the Mander family of Midland England.

New Zealand Parliament
| Preceded by Robert Thompson | Member of Parliament for Marsden; 1902–1922 | Succeeded by Alfred Murdoch |
