= Francis Hull =

New Zealand politician

New Zealand Parliament
Years	Term	Electorate	Party
1866–1869	4th	Marsden	Independent

Francis Holmes Hull (1816– 13 July 1884) was a 19th-century Member of Parliament in the Auckland Region, New Zealand.

He represented the Marsden electorate from 1866 until he resigned. Parliament received his resignation on 1 June 1869.

New Zealand Parliament
Preceded by John Munro	Member of Parliament for Marsden; 1866–1869	Succeeded by John Munro
