= 1954 New Zealand general election =

- 13 November 1954

All 80 seats in the House of Representatives 41 seats were needed for a majority
- Turnout: 1,096,877 (91.4%) ▲
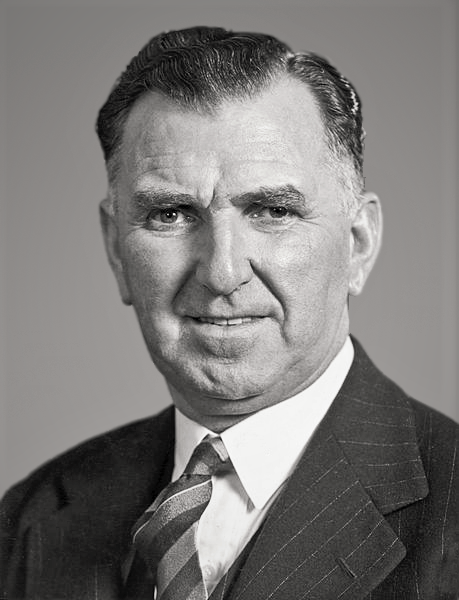

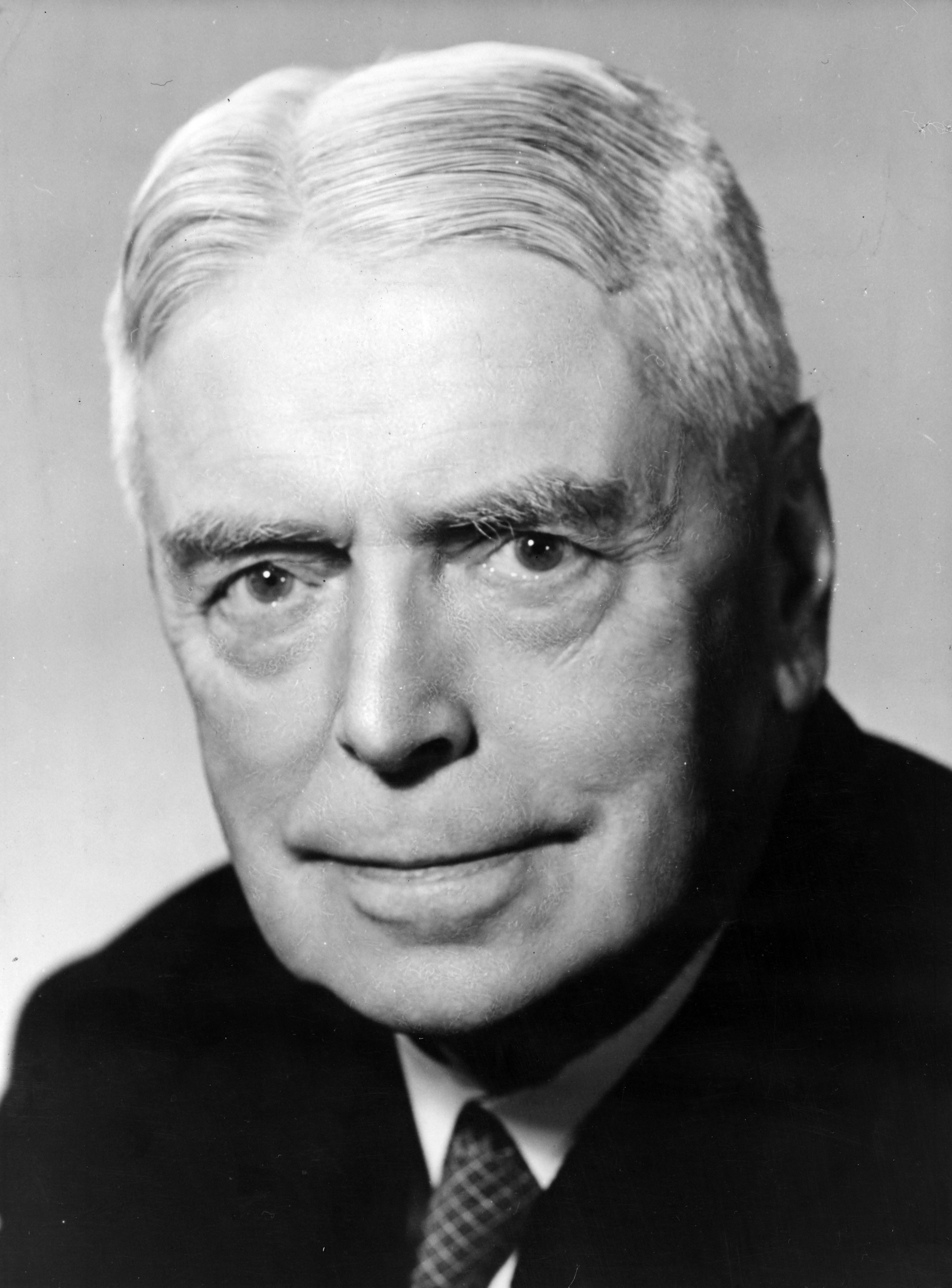
	First party	Second party
Leader	Sidney Holland	Walter Nash
Party	National	Labour
Leader since	26 November 1940	17 January 1951
Leader's seat	Fendalton	Hutt
Last election	50 seats, 54.0%	30 seats, 45.8%
Seats won	45	35
Seat change	▼5	▲5
Popular vote	485,630	484,028
Percentage	44.3%	44.1%
Swing	▼9.7%	▼1.7%
- Results of the election.
Prime Minister before election
Sidney Holland
National
Subsequent Prime Minister
Sidney Holland
National

The 1954 New Zealand general election was a nationwide vote to determine the shape of the New Zealand Parliament's 31st term. It saw the governing National Party remain in office, but with a slightly reduced majority. It also saw the debut of the new Social Credit Party, which won more than eleven percent of the vote but failed to win a seat.

== Background ==
The National Party had formed its first administration after the 1949 elections. It had then been re-elected by a large margin amid the industrial disputes of the 1951 election. The Prime Minister, Sidney Holland, was popular in many sectors of society for his strong line against striking dockworkers and coalminers, while Labour's leader, Walter Nash, had been criticised for his failure to take a firm stand on the issue. Labour was troubled by internal disputes, with Nash subjected to an unsuccessful leadership challenge only a few months before the election. For the election, the National government adopted a "steady as she goes" approach, saying that the country was in good hands and did not need any major policy realignments.

Nash tried to make the election about the issue of cost-of-living with most of Labour's campaign promises being financial policies. He frequently highlighted the fact that in 1949 National had promised to "make the pound go further" but five years on what cost £1 (20 shillings) now cost 28 shillings. Labour's campaign promises included raising the child allowance to 15 shillings a week, housing loans with only 3% interest and the introduction of a PAYE income taxation system. After a slow start to his campaign, things improved for Nash towards the end of his campaign. This was evidenced by his audiences becoming more enthusiastic such as one meeting held at the Auckland Town Hall where a crowd of 10,000 impatiently telling the first speaker, trade union president Fintan Patrick Walsh, to sit down and a chant of "we want Walter" breaking out.

The Social Credit campaign meetings aroused far more public interest than those of the main parties. A common public perception was Labour and National were increasingly close to each other on policies compared to the substantial policy differences in the 1930s. In an attempt to counter the public enthusiasm to Social Credit, Labour promised mid-campaign to make the state the sole authority for the issue of credit and currency.

Contemporary commentary in The New Zealand Listener noted the unusually quiet tone of the 1954 campaign, observing that while the absence of controversy may have led some to worry about public apathy, the gravity of electing a government still carried democratic weight. The article suggested that the electorate's familiarity with the major parties’ policies, combined with an educated public and increased access to political debate through radio broadcasts, meant that voters could make informed decisions even without attending campaign meetings in person.

== The election ==
The date for the main 1954 elections was 13 November. 1,209,670 people were registered to vote, and turnout was 91.4%. The number of seats being contested was 80, a number which had been fixed since 1902.

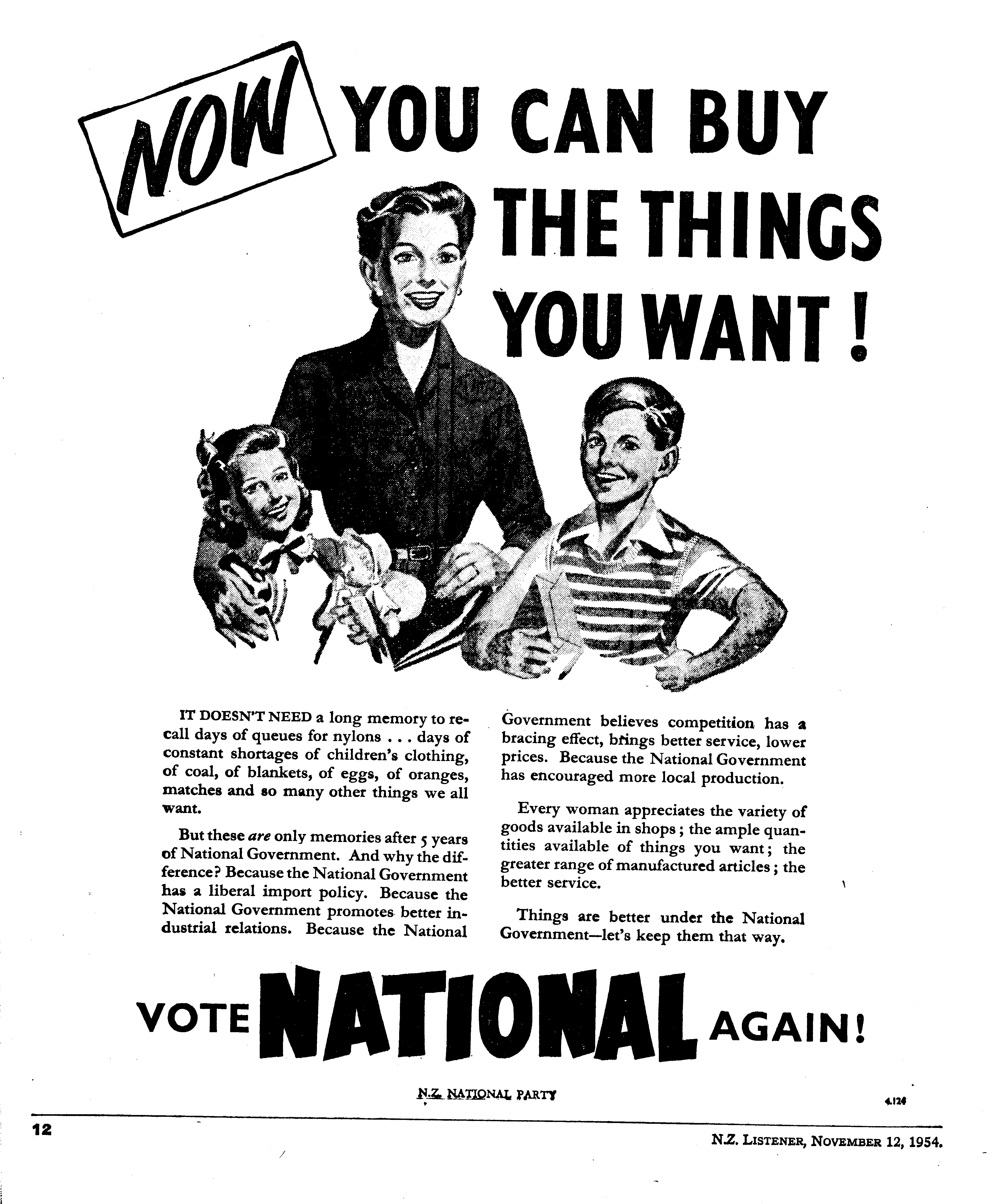
Full-page advertisement by the New Zealand National Party published in the New Zealand Listener, 12 November 1954, p.12

In what was described at the time as the most competitive election since 1935, the 1954 contest featured an unusually high number of candidates and the active presence of a third party in all but one seat. Fifteen electorates had no sitting member re-contesting due to retirements and boundary changes, while two others, Eden and Onslow, saw incumbent MPs standing against each other. Electoral boundary revisions were extensive, affecting nearly all electorates, and resulted in the abolition of six electorates (Arch Hill, Brooklyn, Mt. Victoria, Parnell, Piako, and Waimarino).

The following new (or reconstituted) electorates were introduced in 1954: Heretaunga, Manukau, Rotorua, Stratford, Waipa and Waitemata. Two candidates, both called John Stewart, came second; in Auckland Central for National and in Eden for Labour.

=== MPs retiring in 1954 ===
Ten MPs retired at the election, see cartoon.

Party	Name	Electorate
Independent	William Sheat	Patea
National	William Bodkin	Central Otago
National	Wilfred Fortune	Eden
National	Andy Sutherland	Hauraki
National	Chales Bowden	Karori
National	Alfred Murdoch	Marsden
National	Edward Gordon	Rangitīkei
National	Clifton Webb	Rodney
National	Walter Broadfoot	Waitomo
Labour	Robert McKeen	Island Bay
Labour	Bob Semple	Miramar
Labour	Charles Chapman	Wellington Central

Paddy Kearins also left parliament at the election. His electorate of Waimarino was abolished and he failed to gain selection to stand for Labour in the replacement electorate of Rotorua. Two Labour MPs had announced their intention to retire at the 1954 election (Harry Combs MP for Onslow and Arthur Osborne MP for Onehunga) but died before the end of the parliament.

== Results ==
The 1954 election saw the governing National Party re-elected with a ten-seat margin, a drop from the twenty-seat margin it previously held. National won forty-five seats to the Labour Party's thirty-five. The popular vote was much closer, however, with the two parties separated by only 0.2% (1,602 votes). On preliminary results Labour was leading in 37 seats and was actually ahead of National in the popular vote by 0.33%. No seats were won by minor party candidates or by independents, but the new Social Credit Party managed to win 11.2% of the vote, and it can be argued that Social Credit saved the National Government by providing an alternative to Labour and so minimising the two-party swing. Nash argued that Social Credit's impact on the election was being a spoiler, claiming Labour was denied victory because of this.

Election results
Party	Candidates	Total votes	Percentage	Seats won	change
National	79	485,630	44.3	45	−5
Labour	80	484,028	44.1	35	+5
Social Credit	79	122,573	11.2	0	±0
Communist	8	1,134	0.1	0	±0
Independents	9	3,474	0.3	0	±0
Total	255	1,096,877		80	

=== Votes summary ===
Popular vote
National	44.27%
Labour	44.13%
Social Credit	11.17%
Others	0.43%

Parliament seats
National	56.25%
Labour	43.75%

The table below shows the results of the 1954 general election:

Key

National Labour Independent Social Credit

Electorate results for the 1954 New Zealand general election
Electorate	Incumbent	Winner	Majority	Runner up
General electorates
Ashburton	Geoff Gerard		2,292	George Glassey
Auckland Central	Bill Anderton		4,093	John Weir Stewart
Avon	John Mathison		4,955	Arthur Norman Stone
Awarua	George Herron		3,172	J P Wyatt
Bay of Plenty	Bill Sullivan		3,062	Godfrey Santon
Buller	Jerry Skinner		3,348	Derisly Manwell Carson
Central Otago	William Bodkin	Jack George	2,074	Peter John Scott
Christchurch Central	Robert Macfarlane		3,395	Oliver G. Moody
Clutha	James Roy		1,490	T A Rodgers
Dunedin Central	Phil Connolly		330	Marcus Anderson
Dunedin North	Ethel McMillan		2,791	Helen Black
Eden	Wilfred Fortune	Duncan Rae	8	John Stewart (Note: John Stewart was first on election night, but lost when special votes were included)
Egmont	Ernest Corbett		2,977	Roy Evans
Fendalton	Sidney Holland		3,004	Roy Henry McDonald
Franklin	Jack Massey		4,587	Percival Peacock
Gisborne	Harry Dudfield	Reginald Keeling	521	Harry Dudfield
Grey Lynn	Fred Hackett		4,807	Tom McGowan
Hamilton	Hilda Ross		1,430	Ben Waters
Hastings	Sydney Jones	Ted Keating	252	Sydney Jones
Hauraki	Andy Sutherland	Arthur Kinsella	2,659	Brevat William Dynes
Hawkes Bay	Cyril Harker		3,109	A Stafford
Heretaunga	New electorate	Phil Holloway	5,058	Allan McCready
Hobson	Sidney Smith		2,584	Cecil William Elvidge
Hurunui	William Gillespie		2,395	Norman Kirk
Hutt	Walter Nash		3,681	Clevedon Costello
Invercargill	Ralph Hanan		943	William Denham
Island Bay	Robert McKeen	Arnold Nordmeyer	3,824	John Maurice Whitta
Karori	Charles Bowden	Jack Marshall	1,811	Jim Bateman
Lyttelton	Harry Lake		24	Tom McGuigan (Note: Tom McGuigan was first on election night, but lost when special votes were included)
Manawatu	Matthew Oram		2,228	Patrick Kelliher
Manukau	New electorate	Leon Götz	3,072	Cyril Stamp
Marlborough	Tom Shand		1,635	George Allan Turner
Marsden	Alfred Murdoch	Don McKay	872	Mervyn Allan Hosking (Note: National deselected the sitting MP (Alfred Murdoch) (q.v.) in favour of William Vallance; then Vallance had tax problems and was replaced by Don McKay. When Vallance ran as an independent candidate, the vote-splitting almost cost National the seat.)
Miramar	Bob Semple	Bill Fox	1,527	Robert John McConnell
Mornington	Wally Hudson		3,886	Walter MacDougall
Mt Albert	Warren Freer		3,226	Robert Muldoon
Napier	Peter Tait	Jim Edwards	720	Peter Tait
Nelson	Edgar Neale		717	Stan Whitehead
New Plymouth	Ernest Aderman		1,178	Clarence Robert Parker
North Shore	Dean Eyre		1,395	Arthur Faulkner
Oamaru	Thomas Hayman		1,358	J H Rapson
Onehunga	Hugh Watt		4,389	Alfred E. Allen
Onslow	Henry May		519	Wilfred Fortune
Otahuhu	Leon Götz	James Deas	1,806	Leonard Bradley
Otaki	Jimmy Maher		963	Ernie Langford
Pahiatua	Keith Holyoake		3,519	Ronald Bell
Palmerston North	Blair Tennent	Philip Skoglund	346	Blair Tennant
Patea	William Sheat	Roy Jack	662	Benjamin Winchcombe
Petone	Mick Moohan		4,211	Fanny Elizabeth Soward
Ponsonby	Ritchie Macdonald		3,948	Harold Barry
Raglan	Hallyburton Johnstone		857	James Harrison Wilson
Rangitikei	Edward Gordon	Norman Shelton	2,679	Stephen Malcolm Roberton
Remuera	Ronald Algie		3,544	Bob Tizard
Riccarton	Angus McLagan		4,343	Balfour Grieve Dingwall
Rodney	Clifton Webb	Jack Scott	3,270	Arthur Hellyn
Roskill	John Rae		1,652	Elizabeth Morris
Rotorua	New electorate	Ray Boord	822	Percy Allen
St Albans	Jack Watts		608	Mick Connelly
St Kilda	Jim Barnes		114	Fred Jones
Selwyn	John McAlpine		2,521	Daniel Clinton
Stratford	New electorate	Thomas Murray	2,966	Brian Edgar Richmond
Sydenham	Mabel Howard		5,560	Alma Schumacher
Tamaki	Eric Halstead		1,986	Pat Curran
Tauranga	George Walsh		3,448	Oliver Liddell
Timaru	Clyde Carr		1,423	Vic Wilson
Waikato	Geoffrey Sim		4,698	Albert Clifford Tucker
Waimate	(vacant) (Note: David Campbell Kidd, the National Party MP for Waimate, died less than two months before the election, leaving his seat vacant.)	Alfred Davey	1,438	Neville Pickering
Waipa	New electorate	Stan Goosman	4,435	Harold Francis Gallagher
Wairarapa	Bert Cooksley		1,691	Bob Wilkie
Waitakere	Rex Mason		3,424	Jim McAllister
Waitemata	New electorate	Norman King	387	Hubert Morrison
Waitomo	Walter Broadfoot	David Seath	1,480	Vic Haines
Wallace	Tom Macdonald		4,466	J W Cleary
Wanganui	Joe Cotterill		305	Jack Rumbold
Wellington Central	Charles Chapman	Frank Kitts	627	Allan Highet
Westland	Jim Kent		3,605	Mark Wallace
Māori electorates
Eastern Maori	Tiaki Omana		3,094	Claude Anaru
Northern Maori	Tapihana Paikea		4,435	Tono Waetford
Southern Maori	Eruera Tirikatene		2,864	Turi Carroll
Western Maori	Iriaka Rātana		6,637	William Rakeipoho Bennett

Table footnotes
