= Marsden (electorate) =

Marsden was a former parliamentary electorate, in the Whangarei District and in the Northland Region of New Zealand, which existed from 1858 to 1972. Upon its abolition, Marsden was replaced with the Whangarei electorate.

== Population centres ==
The initial 24 New Zealand electorates were defined by Governor George Grey in March 1853, based on the New Zealand Constitution Act 1852 that had been passed by the British government. The Constitution Act also allowed the House of Representatives to establish new electorates, and this was first done in 1858, when four new electorates were formed by splitting existing electorates. Marsden was one of those four electorates, and it covered the northern area split off from the Northern Division electorate.

The electorate was mixed urban and rural, around the city of Whangārei.

== History ==
The electorate existed from 1858 to 1972, and the first election was held on 29 November 1859, which was during the term of the 2nd Parliament. James Farmer was the first representative. The second representative was John Munro, who was elected on 27 December 1860, and served the whole term of the 3rd Parliament.

Francis Hull was elected to the 4th Parliament, resigned in 1869 and was succeeded by Munro in the February by-election. Munro served the rest of the term, plus the term of the 5th Parliament.

All subsequent representatives have always served full terms.

In the 1879 election there was some doubt about the validity of the election result, and a law was passed to confirm the result in Marsden and two other electorates.

The 1887 election was contested by Robert Thompson and Joseph Dargaville, and they received 955 and 550 votes, respectively. Thompson was thus declared elected.

Thompson acquired the labels 'Marsden Thompson' and 'the member for roads and bridges' in Parliament. He was known for his devotion to the interests of his district, which was desperately in need of good roads, and his only reason for being a Liberal was that the government was the only source of funding for roads and bridges (as with many other Liberals representing country electorates). He was pro-freehold (land), and was opposed to Liberal policies such as labour legislation and old age pensions. In 1908, when he stood unsuccessfully for Auckland West against a sitting Liberal member, he was once more an independent, and his programme – freehold (land), acquisition of Maori land and opposition to prohibition had not altered.

Alfred Murdoch unsuccessfully contested the Marsden electorate in the 1919 election as an independent Liberal against the incumbent from the Reform Party, Francis Mander. Mander retired at the 1922 election, and Murdoch was elected. At the next election in 1925, Murdoch was defeated by William Jones of the Reform Party, but Murdoch defeated Jones in turn in 1928 when he stood for the United Party. After two parliamentary terms, Murdoch was defeated in 1935 by Jim Barclay of the Labour Party. In 1943, Murdoch, now standing for the National Party, defeated Barclay and won the electorate back, and held it until he retired in 1954.

=== Members of Parliament ===
Key:

Independent Conservative Liberal Independent Liberal Reform United Labour National

Election	Winner
1859 supplementary election	James Farmer
1861 election	John Munro
1866 election	Francis Hull
1869 by-election	John Munro
1871 election	John Munro
1876 election	Sir Robert Douglas
1879 election	William Colbeck
1881 election	Edwin Mitchelson
1884 election	Edwin Mitchelson
1887 election	Robert Thompson
1890 election	Robert Thompson
1893 election	Robert Thompson
1896 election	Robert Thompson
1899 election	Robert Thompson
1902 election	Francis Mander
1905 election	Francis Mander
1908 election	Francis Mander
1911 election	Francis Mander
1914 election	Francis Mander
1919 election	Francis Mander
1922 election	Alfred Murdoch
1925 election	William Jones
1928 election	Alfred Murdoch
1931 election	Alfred Murdoch
1935 election	Jim Barclay
1938 election	Jim Barclay
1943 election	Alfred Murdoch
1946 election	Alfred Murdoch
1949 election	Alfred Murdoch
1951 election	Alfred Murdoch
1954 election	Don McKay
1957 election	Don McKay
1960 election	Don McKay
1963 election	Don McKay
1966 election	Don McKay
1969 election	Don McKay
(electorate abolished 1972; see Whangarei)

== Election results ==
=== 1969 election ===
1969 general election: Marsden
Party	Candidate	Votes	%	±%
National	Don McKay	7,660	45.23	−5.59
Labour	Murray Smith	6,559	38.73	
Social Credit	John Geoffrey Rawson	2,715	16.03	−5.00
Majority		1,101	6.50	−16.76
Turnout		16,934	89.86	+3.65
Registered electors		18,843		

=== 1966 election ===
1966 general election: Marsden
Party	Candidate	Votes	%	±%
National	Don McKay	8,907	50.82	−4.43
Labour	Owen James Lewis	4,830	27.56	
Social Credit	John Geoffrey Rawson	3,686	21.03	−7.03
Independent	R Graham	101	0.57	
Majority		4,077	23.26	−1.25
Turnout		17,524	86.21	−2.99
Registered electors		20,326		

=== 1963 election ===
1963 general election: Marsden
Party	Candidate	Votes	%	±%
National	Don McKay	8,885	55.25	−2.05
Labour	Owen James Lewis	4,943	30.74	
Social Credit	John Geoffrey Rawson	2,252	14.00	
Majority		3,942	24.51	−4.13
Turnout		16,080	89.20	−0.70
Registered electors		18,026		

=== 1960 election ===
1960 general election: Marsden
Party	Candidate	Votes	%	±%
National	Don McKay	8,704	57.30	+5.07
Labour	John Swanson Reid	4,353	28.65	
Social Credit	Robert Arthur McQuillian	2,132	14.03	
Majority		4,351	28.64	+14.77
Turnout		15,189	89.70	−2.52
Registered electors		16,932		

=== 1957 election ===
1957 general election: Marsden
Party	Candidate	Votes	%	±%
National	Don McKay	7,906	52.53	+14.98
Labour	Mervyn Allan Hosking	5,818	38.65	+7.18
Social Credit	William Rodney Lewin Vallance	994	6.60	−5.75
Ind. Social Credit	Eva Hill	332	2.20	−16.44
Majority		2,088	13.87	+7.80
Turnout		15,050	92.22	+0.40
Registered electors		16,318		

=== 1954 election ===
1954 general election: Marsden
Party	Candidate	Votes	%	±%
National	Don McKay	5,389	37.55	
Labour	Mervyn Allan Hosking	4,517	31.47	−4.30
Social Credit	Eva Hill	2,676	18.64	
Independent	William Rodney Lewin Vallance	1,768	12.32	
Majority		872	6.07	
Turnout		14,350	91.82	+4.96
Registered electors		15,628		

=== 1951 election ===
1951 General election: Marsden
Party	Candidate	Votes	%	±%
National	Alfred Murdoch	9,031	64.22	+2.70
Labour	Mervyn Allan Hosking	5,030	35.77	
Majority		4,001	28.45	+5.41
Turnout		14,061	86.86	−6.24
Registered electors		16,188		

=== 1949 election ===
1949 general election: Marsden
Party	Candidate	Votes	%	±%
National	Alfred Murdoch	8,746	61.52	+4.03
Labour	Douglas L. Ross	5,470	38.47	
Majority		3,276	23.04	+7.31
Turnout		14,216	93.10	−2.14
Registered electors		15,268		

=== 1946 election ===
1946 general election: Marsden
Party	Candidate	Votes	%	±%
National	Alfred Murdoch	7,851	57.49	+4.91
Labour	John Stewart	5,702	41.75	
Informal votes		98	0.71	−0.21
Majority		2,149	15.73	+7.20
Turnout		13,655	95.24	+0.06
Registered electors		14,337		

=== 1943 election ===
1943 general election: Marsden (Note: Registered electors refers to civilian voters only; nationwide, 93,295 servicemen also cast valid votes although their names did not appear on electoral rolls.)
Party	Candidate	Votes	%	±%
National	Alfred Murdoch	6,202	52.58	+4.95
Labour	Jim Barclay	5,196	44.05	−8.32
Democratic Labour	Ernest Petty	398	3.37	
Informal votes		110	0.92	+0.56
Majority		1,006	8.53	+3.79
Turnout		11,906	95.18	+0.09
Registered electors		12,509		

Table footnotes:

=== 1938 election ===
1938 general election: Marsden
Party	Candidate	Votes	%	±%
Labour	Jim Barclay	6,157	52.37	+4.30
National	Alfred Murdoch	5,600	47.63	+2.76
Informal votes		43	0.36	−0.19
Majority		557	4.74	+1.55
Turnout		11,800	95.08	+3.52
Registered electors		12,410		

=== 1935 election ===
1935 general election: Marsden
Party	Candidate	Votes	%	±%
Labour	Jim Barclay	5,215	48.07	+14.91
United	Alfred Murdoch	4,868	44.87	−21.97
Democrat	R Johns	602	5.54	
Independent Liberal	St. Claire Jounneaux	163	1.50	
Informal votes		60	0.55	−1.07
Majority		347	3.19	
Turnout		10,848	91.56	+10.10
Registered electors		11,847		

=== 1931 election ===
1931 general election: Marsden
Party	Candidate	Votes	%	±%
United	Alfred Murdoch	5,838	66.84	+22.73
Labour	Jim Barclay	2,896	33.16	
Informal votes		144	1.62	+0.87
Majority		2,942	33.68	+28.63
Turnout		8,878	81.46	−6.46
Registered electors		10,898		

=== 1928 election ===
1928 general election: Marsden
Party	Candidate	Votes	%	±%
United	Alfred Murdoch	3,925	44.12	+3.42
Reform	William Jones	3,475	39.06	−9.46
Labour	William Henry Chetham	1,299	14.60	
Independent	Albert Hugh Curtis	198	2.23	
Informal votes		67	0.75	+0.09
Majority		450	5.06	−2.76
Turnout		8,964	87.93	−2.84
Registered electors		10,195		

=== 1925 election ===
1925 general election: Marsden
Party	Candidate	Votes	%	±%
Reform	William Jones	4,038	48.52	−0.56
Independent Liberal	Alfred Murdoch	3,387	40.70	−10.22
Labour	Arthur Shapton Richards	897	10.78	
Informal votes		55	0.66	−0.62
Majority		651	7.82	+5.98
Turnout		8,377	90.77	+3.71
Registered electors		9,229		

=== 1922 election ===
1922 general election: Marsden
Party	Candidate	Votes	%	±%
Independent Liberal	Alfred Murdoch	3,752	50.92	+14.90
Reform	William Jones	3,616	49.08	
Majority		136	1.85	−1.37
Informal votes		95	1.27	−0.53
Turnout		7,463	87.06	+8.35
Registered electors		8,572		

=== 1919 election ===
1919 general election: Marsden
Party	Candidate	Votes	%	±%
Reform	Francis Mander	2,307	39.24	
Independent Liberal	Alfred Murdoch	2,118	36.03	
Independent Labour	Donald Alexander McLean	850	14.46	
Independent	Albert Hugh Curtis	604	10.27	
Informal votes		108	1.80	
Majority		189	3.21	
Turnout		5,987	78.71	
Registered electors		7,606		

=== 1899 election ===
1899 general election: Marsden
Party	Candidate	Votes	%	±%
Independent Liberal	Robert Thompson	2,205	59.42	
Conservative	George Alderton	891	24.01	
Independent	Charles Mackesy	615	16.57	
Majority		1,314	35.41	
Turnout		3,711	66.97	
Registered electors		5,541		

=== 1890 election ===
1890 general election: Marsden
Party	Candidate	Votes	%	±%
Conservative	Robert Thompson	803	56.15	
Liberal	Albert Elliot	627	43.84	
Majority		176	12.30	
Turnout		1,430	49.04	
Registered electors		2,914		
