= New Zealand Marine Department =

Defunct New Zealand government department

The New Zealand Marine Department was a government department in New Zealand that managed the administration of marine law.

== History ==
The New Zealand Marine Department was created in late 1866, initially holding responsibility for the administration of the country's lighthouses. It grew in scope to cover many other responsibilities including overseeing mercantile marine activities and harbour duties, regulating the fisheries industry and the administration of the Ross Dependency.

The Marine Department was initially under the ministerial control of the Postmaster-General, until 1870 when it instead became a part of the New Zealand Customs Department. The Marine Department remained a part the Customs Department until 1903 (apart from a minor interlude between 1878 and 1881) when it was made a stand-alone government department. The Shipping and Seamen's Act of 1877 gave the Marine Department statutory recognition and authorised the Governor to appoint both a Minister and a Secretary to head the Department.

During the early 1970s, following a report of the Royal Commission of Inquiry into the State Services in New Zealand, the Marine Department was converted into the Marine Division of the Ministry of Transport. However many of its functions were distributed across a number of other agencies.

== List of secretaries ==
The following is a list of marine secretaries:

- James Balfour 11 October 1866 to 29 December 1869
- Captain Robert Johnson (acting) 29 December 1869 to 25 February 1870
- William Seed 25 February 1870 to 1 October 1887
- William Thomas Glasgow 1 October 1887 to 9 June 1888
- Henry Scott McKellar McKellar 9 June 1888 to 1 May 1892
- William Thomas Glasgow 1 May 1892 to 1 April 1903
- George Allport 1 April 1903 to 1 April 1920
- Robert Duncan 1 April 1920 to 23 June 1922
- Alexander Park 23 June 1922 to 24 October 1923
- George Crosbie Godfrey 24 October 1923 to 2 April 1932
- B. W. Miller (acting) 2 April 1932 to 1 July 1933
- L. B. Campbell 1 July 1933 to 14 March 1944
- B. W. Miller (acting) 14 March 1944 to 15 August 1945
- W. C. Smith 15 August 1945 to 1 March 1955
- G. L. O'Halloran 1 March 1955 to 1972

== See also ==
- Minister of Marine
- Maritime New Zealand
