= Minister of Health (New Zealand) =

New Zealand minister of the Crown

Minister of Health of New Zealand
- Coat of arms of New Zealand

- Flag of New Zealand

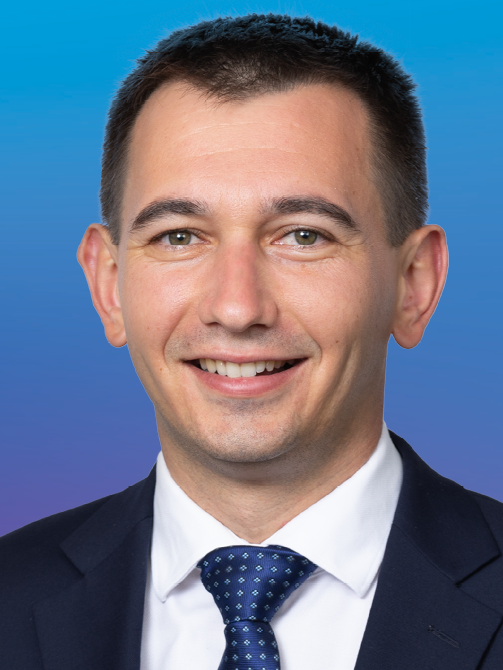
- Incumbent; Simeon Brown since 24 January 2025
- Ministry of Health
- Style: The Honourable
- Member of: Cabinet of New Zealand; Executive Council
- Reports to: Prime Minister of New Zealand
- Appointer: Governor-General of New Zealand
- Term length: At His Majesty's pleasure
- Formation: 8 November 1900
- First holder: Sir Joseph Ward
- Salary: $288,900
- Website: www.beehive.govt.nz

The Minister of Health, formerly styled Minister of Public Health, is a minister in the New Zealand Government with responsibility for the New Zealand Ministry of Health and Te Whatu Ora—Health New Zealand.

The current Minister of Health is National Party MP Simeon Brown.

== History ==
The first Minister of Public Health was appointed in 1900, during the premiership of Richard Seddon. The word "Public" was dropped from the title when Sir Māui Pōmare took over the portfolio from 27 June 1923, as simply "Minister of Health".

In the health system reforms of the 1980s, the Department of Health lost responsibility for both the provision and funding of healthcare – these roles were transferred to separate Crown Health Enterprises (the precursors to today's District Health Boards) and the Health Funding Authority, respectively. The only function remaining was policy-making (resulting in the department being renamed a Ministry). For a time, there was a separate Minister in Charge of Crown Health Enterprises, who was not necessarily the same as the Minister of Health. Further reforms have changed this, however – the Health Funding Authority has been re-absorbed into the Ministry of Health, and the modern District Health Boards, while not part of the Ministry, are considered a responsibility of the Minister of Health.

In July 2022, on the passing of the Pae Ora (Healthy Futures) Act 2022, District Health Boards were disestablished and the provision and funding of healthcare was centralised under Health New Zealand.

== List of Health Ministers ==
Key

Liberal Reform United Labour National

No.	Name	Portrait	Term of Office		Prime Minister
1	Joseph Ward		8 November 1900	6 August 1906	Seddon
1	Joseph Ward		8 November 1900	6 August 1906	Hall-Jones
2	George Fowlds		6 August 1906	6 January 1909	Ward
3	David Buddo		6 January 1909	28 March 1912	Ward
4	George Russell		28 March 1912	10 July 1912	Mackenzie
5	Heaton Rhodes		10 July 1912	12 August 1915	Massey
(4)	George Russell		12 August 1915	25 August 1919	Massey
6	Francis Bell		4 September 1919	3 April 1920	Massey
7	James Parr		3 April 1920	7 June 1923	Massey
8	Maui Pomare		7 June 1923	18 January 1926	Massey
8	Maui Pomare		7 June 1923	18 January 1926	Bell
8	Maui Pomare		7 June 1923	18 January 1926	Coates
9	Alexander Young		18 January 1926	10 December 1928	Coates
10	Arthur Stallworthy		10 December 1928	22 September 1931	Ward
10	Arthur Stallworthy		10 December 1928	22 September 1931	Forbes
(9)	Alexander Young		22 September 1931	6 December 1935	Forbes
11	Peter Fraser		6 December 1935	30 April 1940	Savage
11	Peter Fraser		6 December 1935	30 April 1940	Fraser
12	Tim Armstrong		30 April 1940	21 January 1941	Fraser
13	Arnold Nordmeyer		21 January 1941	29 May 1947	Fraser
14	Mabel Howard		29 May 1947	13 December 1949	Fraser
15	Jack Watts		13 December 1949	19 September 1951	Holland
16	Jack Marshall		19 September 1951	26 November 1954	Holland
17	Ralph Hanan		26 November 1954	12 December 1957	Holland
17	Ralph Hanan		26 November 1954	12 December 1957	Holyoake
18	Rex Mason		12 December 1957	12 December 1960	Nash
19	Norman Shelton		12 December 1960	24 January 1962	Holyoake
20	Don McKay		24 January 1962	9 February 1972	Holyoake
21	Lance Adams-Schneider		9 February 1972	8 December 1972	Marshall
22	Bob Tizard		8 December 1972	10 September 1974	Kirk
23	Tom McGuigan		10 September 1974	12 December 1975	Rowling
24	Frank Gill		12 December 1975	13 December 1978	Muldoon
25	George Gair		13 December 1978	11 December 1981	Muldoon
26	Aussie Malcolm		11 December 1981	26 July 1984	Muldoon
27	Michael Bassett		26 July 1984	24 August 1987	Lange
28	David Caygill		24 August 1987	30 January 1989	Lange
29	Helen Clark		30 January 1989	2 November 1990	Lange
29	Helen Clark		30 January 1989	2 November 1990	Palmer
29	Helen Clark		30 January 1989	2 November 1990	Moore
30	Simon Upton		2 November 1990	27 March 1993	Bolger
31	Bill Birch		27 March 1993	29 November 1993	Bolger
32	Jenny Shipley		29 November 1993	16 December 1996	Bolger
33	Bill English		16 December 1996	2 February 1999	Bolger
33	Bill English		16 December 1996	2 February 1999	Shipley
34	Wyatt Creech		2 February 1999	10 December 1999	Shipley
35	Annette King		10 December 1999	19 October 2005	Clark
36	Pete Hodgson		19 October 2005	5 November 2007	Clark
37	David Cunliffe		5 November 2007	19 November 2008	Clark
38	Tony Ryall		19 November 2008	6 October 2014	Key
39	Jonathan Coleman		6 October 2014	26 October 2017	Key
39	Jonathan Coleman		6 October 2014	26 October 2017	English
40	David Clark		26 October 2017	2 July 2020	Ardern
41	Chris Hipkins		2 July 2020	6 November 2020	Ardern
42	Andrew Little		6 November 2020	1 February 2023	Ardern
42	Andrew Little		6 November 2020	1 February 2023	Hipkins
43	Ayesha Verrall		1 February 2023	27 November 2023	Hipkins
44	Shane Reti		27 November 2023	24 January 2025	Luxon
45	Simeon Brown		24 January 2025	Present	Luxon
