= Allan McCready =

New Zealand politician (1916–2003)

The Honourable Allan McCready QSO
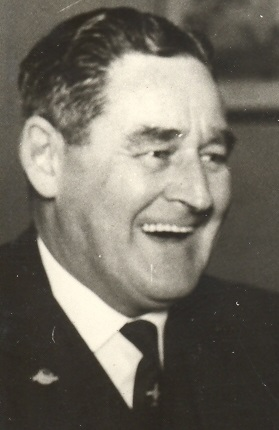

24th Minister of Defence
- In office 12 December 1975 – 13 December 1978
- Preceded by: Bill Fraser
- Succeeded by: Frank Gill
- In office 9 February 1972 – 8 December 1972
- Preceded by: David Thomson
- Succeeded by: Arthur Faulkner

Personal details
- Born: 1 September 1916 Kawakawa, New Zealand
- Died: 8 August 2003 (aged 86)
- Party: National

Allan McCready QSO (1 September 1916 – 8 August 2003) was a New Zealand politician of the National Party.

== Biography ==
New Zealand Parliament
Years	Term	Electorate	Party
1960–1963	33rd	Otaki	National
1963–1966	34th	Otaki	National
1966–1969	35th	Otaki	National
1969–1972	36th	Otaki	National
1972–1975	37th	Manawatu	National
1975–1978	38th	Manawatu	National

McCready was born in Kawakawa in 1916, the son of Alexander McCready. He received his education at Kawakawa District High School. In 1942, McCready married Grace Lorraine Maher, the daughter of Jimmy Maher, later the MP for Otaki. They had one son and one daughter. In World War II he served in the New Zealand Army for 3½ years.

He worked for the Post Office Department for ten years. He was then the director of the Wellington Dairy Farmers Co-op, and then director of the Hutt Valley Milk Treatment Corporation, the Featherston Co-op, and finally the Dairy Company Limited. He was vice-president of the Wellington and Hutt Valley A & P Association.

He stood unsuccessfully for the Heretaunga electorate in 1954 and 1957. When his father-in-law retired from the Otaki electorate at the 1960 election, McCready succeeded him. He represented the Otaki electorate until 1972, then the Manawatu electorate from 1972 to 1978, when he retired.

He was a Cabinet Minister in the Second and Third National Government, including the position of Postmaster-General (1969–1972), Minister of Marine and Fisheries (1969–1972), Minister of Defence (1975–1978), and Minister of Police (1975–1978).

In the 1992 Queen's Birthday Honours, McCready was appointed a Companion of the Queen's Service Order for public services. McCready died on 8 August 2003, aged 86. He was survived by his wife and children.

== Notes ==
Political offices
Preceded by Jack Scott	Postmaster-General; 1969–1972	Succeeded by Bert Walker
Preceded by Mick Connelly	Minister of Police; 1975–1978	Succeeded by Frank Gill
New Zealand Parliament
Preceded by Jimmy Maher	Member of Parliament for Otaki; 1960–1972	In abeyance Title next held by Judy Keall
Preceded by Les Gandar	Member of Parliament for Manawatu; 1972–1978	Succeeded by Michael Cox
