= Bert Walker (politician) =

New Zealand politician (1919–2008)

New Zealand Parliament
Years	Term	Electorate	Party
1960–1963	33rd	St Albans	National
1963–1966	34th	St Albans	National
1966–1969	35th	St Albans	National
1969–1972	36th	Papanui	National
1972–1975	37th	Papanui	National
1975–1978	38th	Papanui	National

Herbert John Walker CMG JP (2 June 1919 – 4 January 2008) was a New Zealand politician of the National Party.

== Biography ==
Walker was born in Rangiora in 1919, and was educated at Rangiora High School. In World War II he served in the Pacific as a NCO in the No. 9 Squadron of the RNZAF from 1942 to 1945, and then qualified as an accountant.

He represented the Christchurch electorates of St Albans in Parliament from 1960 to 1969, and then Papanui from 1969 to 1978, when he was defeated by Mike Moore.

In 1961 he was one of ten National MPs to vote with the Opposition and remove capital punishment for murder from the Crimes Bill that the Second National Government had introduced. In 1969–1972 he was a cabinet minister in the Second National Government: Minister for Broadcasting and Tourism, and Postmaster-General in 1972. In 1973 when the Labour government of Norman Kirk introduced the Domestic Purposes Benefit (DPB) he said that many lone (solo) mothers on the DPB were "bludgers living off the state".

In 1975–1978 he was Minister of Social Welfare in the Third National Government, and threatened to take legal action against (DPB) beneficiaries in de facto relationships. In the 1978 election he lost to Mike Moore.

Walker was a President of Victoria League Canterbury. In the 1983 New Year Honours, he was appointed a Companion of the Order of St Michael and St George, for public and community service. He died in Rangiora on 4 January 2008.

Political offices
Preceded by Allan McCready	Postmaster-General; 1972	Succeeded by Roger Douglas
New Zealand Parliament
Preceded by Neville Pickering	Member of Parliament for St Albans; 1960–1969	Succeeded by Roger Drayton
New constituency	Member of Parliament for Papanui; 1969–1978	Succeeded by Mike Moore
