= Norman Shelton =

New Zealand politician (1905–1980)

The Honourable Norman Shelton CBE
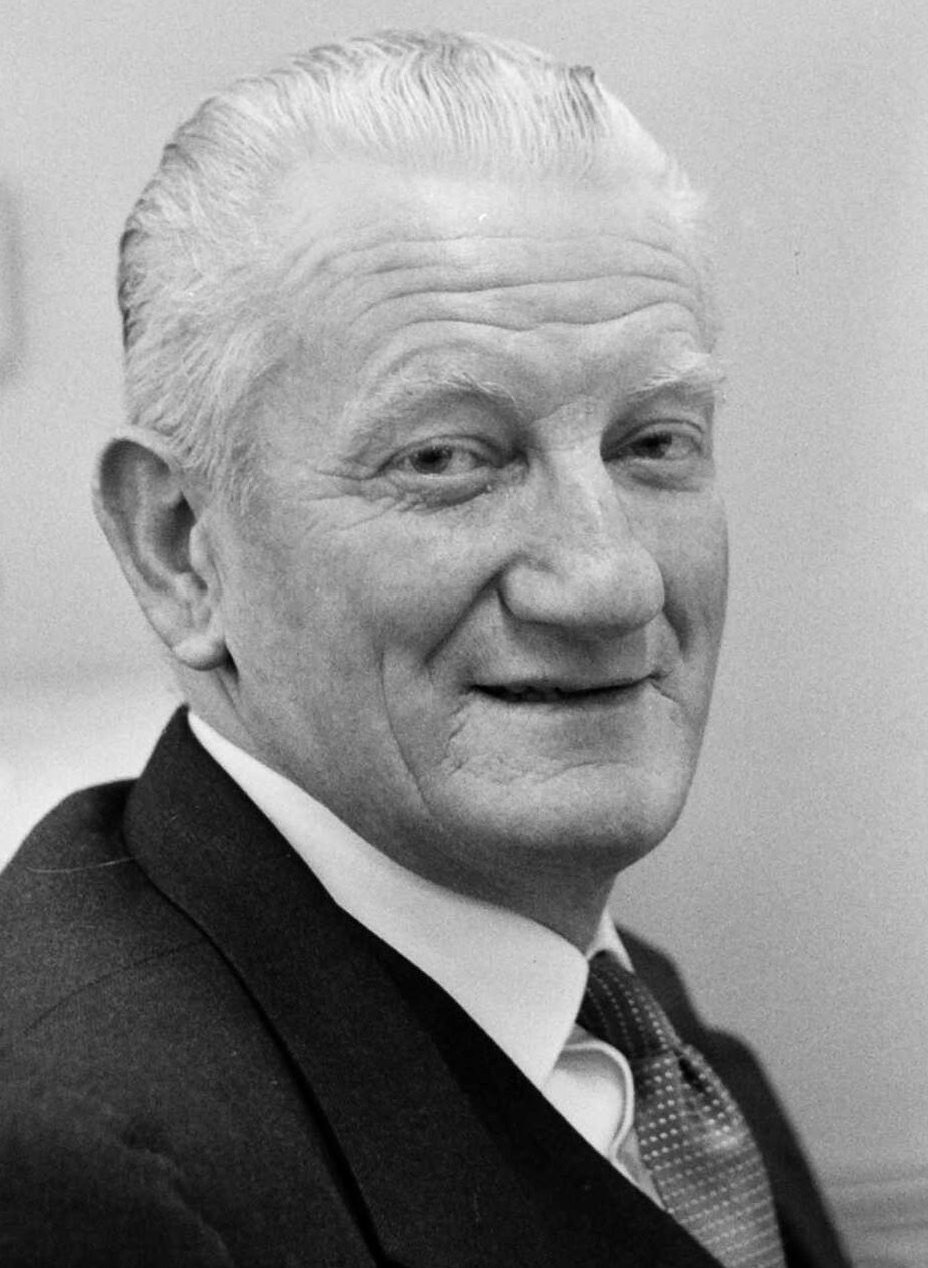
- Shelton in 1959

23rd Minister of Industries and Commerce
- In office 12 December 1969 – 9 February 1972
- Prime Minister: Keith Holyoake
- Preceded by: Jack Marshall
- Succeeded by: Brian Talboys

41st Minister of Customs
- In office 24 January 1962 – 12 December 1969
- Prime Minister: Keith Holyoake
- Preceded by: Jack Marshall
- Succeeded by: Lance Adams-Schneider

19th Minister of Health
- In office 12 December 1960 – 24 January 1962
- Prime Minister: Keith Holyoake
- Preceded by: Rex Mason
- Succeeded by: Don McKay

Member of the New Zealand Parliament for Rangitikei
- In office 13 November 1954 – 25 November 1972
- Preceded by: Edward Gordon
- Succeeded by: Roy Jack

Personal details
- Born: 28 June 1905 Taihape, New Zealand
- Died: 14 July 1980 (aged 75) Wellington, New Zealand
- Party: National
- Spouse: Dorothy Mamie Stevens
- Children: 1
- Relatives: Sharon Crosbie (daughter-in-law)

Norman Leslie Shelton, CBE (28 June 1905 – 14 July 1980) was a New Zealand politician of the National Party.

== Biography ==
=== Early life and career ===
Shelton was born on 27 June 1905 in Taihape and was subsequently educated at Fielding Technical School. He then entered the employment of Hodder and Tolley Ltd in 1920 as a salesman. In 1934, he was appointed manager of the company's Marton branch which he held until 1954 when he resigned. In 1935, he married Dorothy Mamie Stevens. He was interested in music and sung baritone. He was actively involved with the Marton Players and Marton Music Society.

During World War II he was an artillery gunner and posted to the Pacific, Egypt and Italy from 1943 to 1944.

After returning from the war Shelton was president and treasurer of the Marton A & P Association as well as secretary of the Rangitikei Potato Growers Association. He was an advisory member of the Marton Young Farmers, patron of the Marton Scouts and Venturers club and a member of the Marton Jockey and Racing Club.

=== Political career ===
New Zealand Parliament
Years	Term	Electorate	Party
1954–1957	31st	Rangitikei	National
1957–1960	32nd	Rangitikei	National
1960–1963	33rd	Rangitikei	National
1963–1966	34th	Rangitikei	National
1966–1969	35th	Rangitikei	National
1969–1972	36th	Rangitikei	National

He was a member of the National Party and was chairman of the party's Rangitikei electorate committee from 1951 until 1954. He then represented the Rangitikei electorate from 1954 to 1972, when he retired.

In 1953, Shelton was awarded the Queen Elizabeth II Coronation Medal.

He was a Cabinet Minister, including Minister of Health and Minister of Minister of Social Security 1960–1962; Minister of Customs, 1962–1969; Minister of Industries and Commerce, and Minister of Mines, 1969–1972. Prime Minister Keith Holyoake was unsure as to Shelton's inclusion into cabinet after National's win in 1960. Deputy Prime Minister Jack Marshall was convinced of Shelton's administrative ability and ensured Holyoake gave him a place in cabinet.

In December 1967, Shelton and his wife were in a road accident. Their car collided with a car towing a boat just south of the Manawatu River bridge at Foxton causing it to fall down a 40 foot bank. Both of Shelton's legs were broken, including comprehensive damage to ligaments and kneecaps. His wife suffered cuts and bruising while the three people in the other vehicle were unharmed despite their vehicle being overturned. He was taken to Palmerston North Hospital for recovery. He was there for several months and occupied his time doing his ministerial paperwork, contrasting with expectations that he would resign.

He was described by contemporaries as the best minister in the Holyoake cabinet. He was ranked third in the cabinet and was Acting prime minister on several occasions. A man of undoubted ability, he lacked the charisma and ambition to pursue the leadership of the party and by 1970 he was suffering ill-health due to a gall bladder ailment which induced him to retire.

=== Later life and death ===
After retiring he was a newspaper music critic in Wanganui. In the 1973 Queen's Birthday Honours, Shelton was appointed a Commander of the Order of the British Empire, for public services.

He died in Wellington Hospital in 1980, aged 75 years, after suffering from a heart complaint. He was survived by his wife Dorothy and son Lindsay. Lindsay was married to famous broadcaster Sharon Crosbie.

== Notes ==
New Zealand Parliament
Preceded by Edward Gordon	Member of Parliament for Rangitikei; 1954–1972	Succeeded by Roy Jack
Political offices
Preceded by Rex Mason	Minister of Health; 1960–1962	Succeeded by Don McKay
Preceded by Mabel Howard	Minister of Social Security; 1960–1962	Succeeded by Don McKay
Preceded by Jack Marshall	Minister of Customs; 1962–1969	Succeeded by Lance Adams-Schneider
Preceded by Jack Marshall	Minister of Industries and Commerce; 1969–1972	Succeeded by Brian Talboys
