= Minister for Social Development (New Zealand) =

New Zealand minister of the Crown

- Manatū Whakahiato Ora (Māori)
- Coat of arms of New Zealand

- Flag of New Zealand

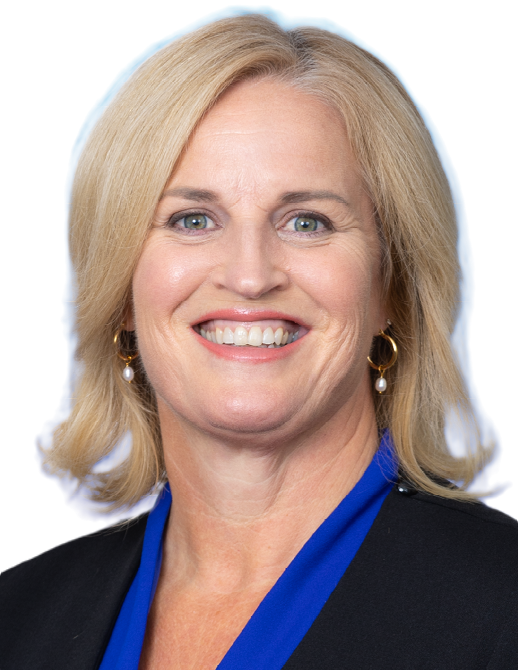
- Incumbent; Louise Upston since 27 November 2023
- Ministry of Social Development
- Style: The Honourable
- Member of: Cabinet of New Zealand; Executive Council
- Reports to: Prime Minister of New Zealand
- Appointer: Governor-General of New Zealand
- Term length: At His Majesty's pleasure
- Formation: 13 December 1938
- First holder: Walter Nash (as Minister for Social Security)
- Salary: $288,900
- Website: www.beehive.govt.nz

The Minister for Social Development (Māori: Te Manatū Whakahiato Ora) is a minister in the New Zealand Government with responsibility promoting social development and welfare, and is in charge of the Ministry of Social Development. The position was established in 1938 after the passing of the Social Security Act 1938.

The present Minister is Louise Upston.

== List of ministers ==
The following individuals have been appointed as Minister for Social Development:

Key

Labour National

No.	Name	Portrait	Term of office		Prime Minister
1	Walter Nash		13 December 1938	30 April 1940	Savage
1	Walter Nash		13 December 1938	30 April 1940	Fraser
2	Bill Parry		30 April 1940	13 December 1949	Fraser
3	Jack Watts		13 December 1949	19 December 1950	Holland
4	William Bodkin		19 December 1950	26 November 1954	Holland
5	Eric Halstead		26 November 1954	23 March 1956	Holland
6	Dean Eyre		23 March 1956	13 February 1957	Holland
7	Geoff Gerard		13 February 1957	26 September 1957	Holland
7	Geoff Gerard		13 February 1957	26 September 1957	Holyoake
8	Hilda Ross		26 September 1957	12 December 1957	Holyoake
9	Mabel Howard		12 December 1957	2 June 1959	Nash
-	Phil Connolly; Acting Minister		2 June 1959	25 August 1959	Nash
(9)	Mabel Howard		25 August 1959	12 December 1960	Nash
10	Norman Shelton		12 December 1960	24 January 1962	Holyoake
11	Don McKay		24 January 1962	9 February 1972	Holyoake
12	Lance Adams-Schneider		9 February 1972	8 December 1972	Marshall
13	Norman King		8 December 1972	12 December 1975	Kirk
13	Norman King		8 December 1972	12 December 1975	Rowling
14	Bert Walker		12 December 1975	13 December 1978	Muldoon
15	George Gair		13 December 1978	12 February 1981	Muldoon
16	Venn Young		12 February 1981	26 July 1984	Muldoon
17	Ann Hercus		26 July 1984	24 August 1987	Lange
18	Michael Cullen		24 August 1987	2 November 1990	Lange
18	Michael Cullen		24 August 1987	2 November 1990	Palmer
18	Michael Cullen		24 August 1987	2 November 1990	Moore
19	Jenny Shipley		2 November 1990	29 November 1993	Bolger
20	Peter Gresham		29 November 1993	12 October 1996	Bolger
21	Roger Sowry		12 October 1996	10 December 1999	Bolger
21	Roger Sowry		12 October 1996	10 December 1999	Shipley
22	Steve Maharey		10 December 1999	19 October 2005	Clark
23	David Benson-Pope		19 October 2005	27 July 2007	Clark
(22)	Steve Maharey; Acting Minister		27 July 2007	31 October 2007	Clark
24	Ruth Dyson		31 October 2007	19 November 2008	Clark
25	Paula Bennett		19 November 2008	6 October 2014	Key
26	Anne Tolley		6 October 2014	26 October 2017	Key
26	Anne Tolley		6 October 2014	26 October 2017	English
27	Carmel Sepuloni		26 October 2017	27 November 2023	Ardern
27	Carmel Sepuloni		26 October 2017	27 November 2023	Hipkins
28	Louise Upston		27 November 2023	present	Luxon
