= 35th New Zealand Parliament =

Term of the Parliament of New Zealand

35th Parliament of New Zealand
←	34th Parliament	36th Parliament	→
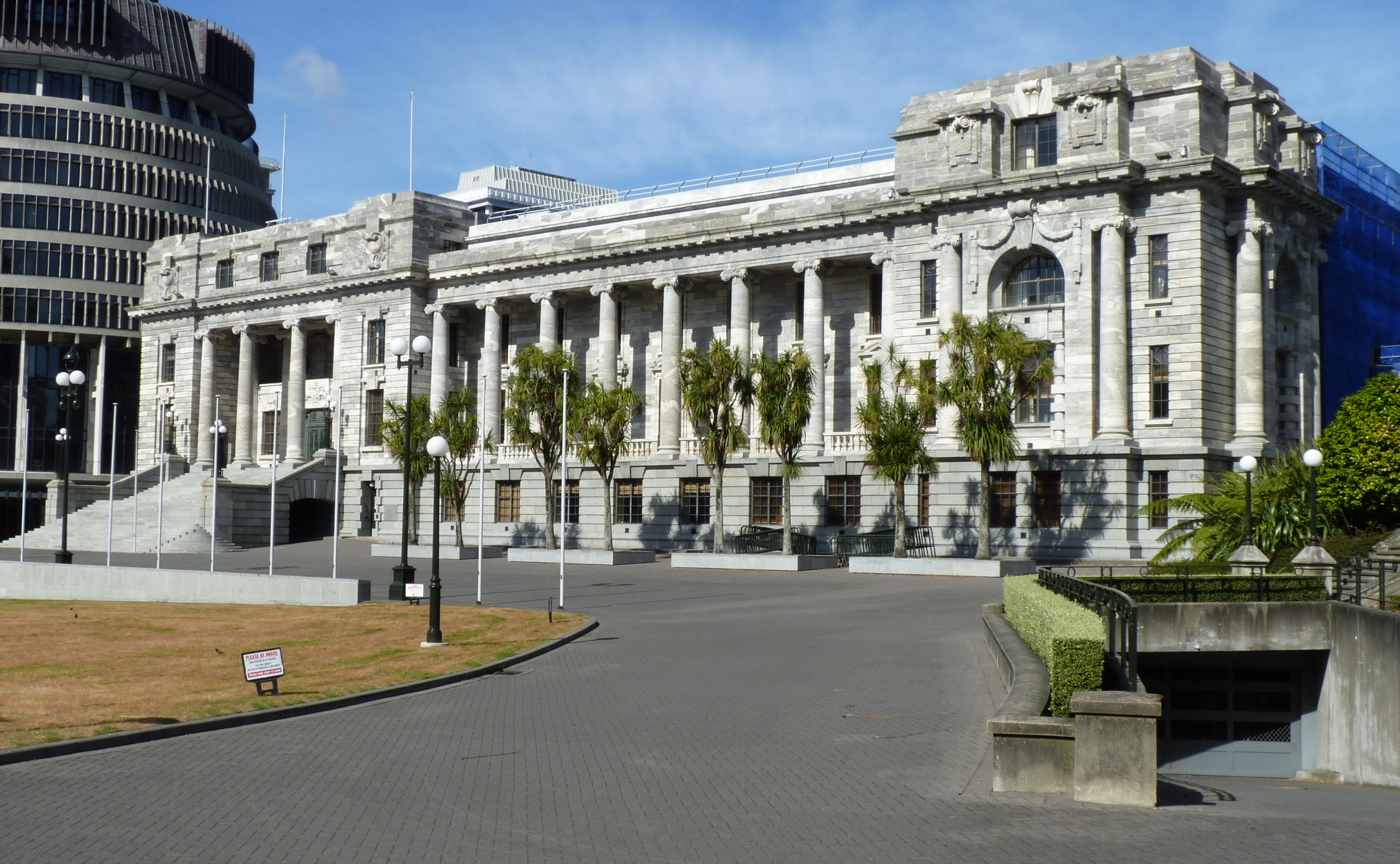
- Parliament House, Wellington

Overview
- Legislative body: New Zealand Parliament
- Term: 26 April 1967 – 24 October 1969
- Election: 1966 New Zealand general election
- Government: Second National Government

House of Representatives
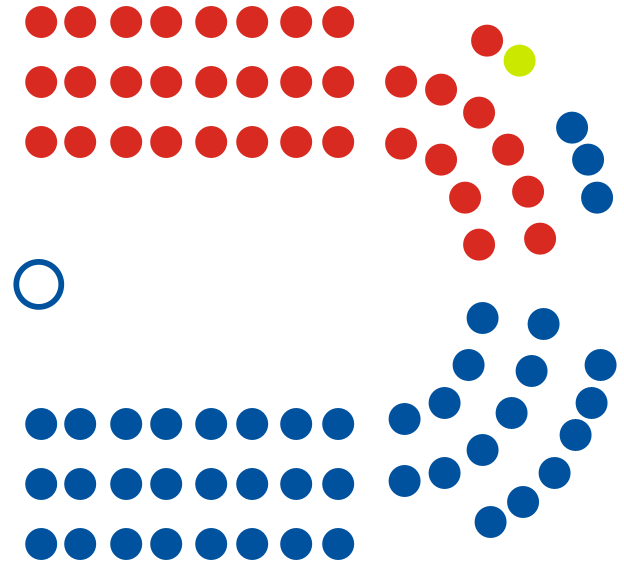
- Members: 80
- Speaker of the House: Roy Jack
- Prime Minister: Keith Holyoake
- Leader of the Opposition: Norman Kirk

Sovereign
- Monarch: HM Elizabeth II
- Governor-General: Sir Arthur Porritt from 1 December 1967 — HE Brigadier Sir Bernard Edward Fergusson until 20 October 1967

The 35th New Zealand Parliament was a term of the New Zealand Parliament. It was elected at the 1966 general election on 26 November of that year.

== 1966 general election ==
The 1966 general election was held on Saturday, 26 November. A total of 80 MPs were elected; 52 represented North Island electorates, 24 represented South Island electorates, and the remaining four represented Māori electorates; this was the same distribution used since the 1963 election. 1,409,600 voters were enrolled and the official turnout at the election was 86.0%.

== Sessions ==
The 35th Parliament sat for three sessions, and was prorogued on 24 October 1969.

Session	Opened	Adjourned
first	26 April 1967	24 November 1967
second	26 June 1968	19 December 1968
third	15 May 1969	24 October 1969

== Ministries ==
The National Party had come to power at the 1960 election, and Keith Holyoake had formed the second Holyoake Ministry on 12 December 1960, which stayed in power until Holyoake stepped down in early 1972. The second National Government remained in place until its defeat at the 1972 election towards the end of that year.

== Overview of seats ==
The table below shows the number of MPs in each party following the 1966 election and at dissolution:

Affiliation	Members	
Affiliation	At 1966 election	At dissolution
National	44	43
Government total	44	43
Labour Opposition	35	36
Social Credit	1	1
Opposition total	36	37
Total	80	80
Working Government majority	8	6

Notes

- The Working Government majority is calculated as all Government MPs less all other parties.

== Initial composition of the 35th Parliament ==
The table below shows the results of the 1966 general election:

Key

National Labour Social Credit

Electorate results for the 1966 New Zealand general election
Electorate	Incumbent	Winner	Majority	Runner up
General electorates
Ashburton	Geoff Gerard	Rob Talbot	983	John Srhoy
Auckland Central	Norman Douglas		2,562	Marie Quinn
Avon	John Mathison		5,232	Dick Dawson
Awarua	Gordon Grieve		3,222	M E Booker
Bay of Plenty	Percy Allen		3,596	Leonard Thomas Fischer
Buller	Bill Rowling		1,822	Ernie King
Christchurch Central	Robert Macfarlane		1,409	Fred Francis
Clutha	Peter Gordon		3,312	Les McKay
Dunedin Central	Brian MacDonell		1,245	John Farry
Dunedin North	Ethel McMillan		2,833	George Barry Gerard
Eden	John Rae		2,548	John William Stewart
Egmont	William Sheat	Venn Young	3,262	H N Johnston
Fendalton	Harry Lake		2,271	Bruce Barclay
Franklin	Alfred E. Allen		5,083	Ron Ng-Waishing
Gisborne	Esme Tombleson		1,432	Bob MacDonald
Grey Lynn	Ritchie Macdonald		4,399	Horace Alexander Nash
Hamilton	Lance Adams-Schneider		2,225	Bob Reese
Hastings	Duncan MacIntyre		2,129	Sonja Davies
Hauraki	Arthur Kinsella		2,336	Henry Uttinger
Hawkes Bay	Richard Harrison		3,915	L K Evans
Heretaunga	Ron Bailey		2,647	Ian Ross
Hobson	Logan Sloane	Vernon Cracknell	490	Logan Sloane
Hutt	Sir Walter Nash		1,949	John Kennedy-Good
Invercargill	Ralph Hanan		2,396	Noel Valentine
Island Bay	Arnold Nordmeyer		2,806	Saul Goldsmith
Karori	Jack Marshall		5,270	Peter Blizard
Lyttelton	Norman Kirk		2,121	Peter de Latour
Manawatu	Blair Tennent	Les Gandar	2,298	Ernie Hemmingsen
Manukau	Colin Moyle		2,728	Max Louis Peers
Manurewa	Phil Amos		2,389	B F Kimpton
Marlborough	Tom Shand		732	Gerry Wall
Marsden	Don McKay		4,077	O J Lewis
Miramar	Bill Fox	Bill Young	146	Bill Fox
Mt Albert	Warren Freer		2,654	Tom Hibbert
Napier	Jim Edwards	Gordon Christie	393	Maurice Kidson
Nelson	Stan Whitehead		2,045	Edwin Slack
New Lynn	Rex Mason	Jonathan Hunt	3,727	Kevin Patrick Lynch
New Plymouth	Ernest Aderman	Ron Barclay	78	Brian Clark
North Shore	Dean Eyre	George Gair	1,108	Michael Bassett
Onehunga	Hugh Watt		4,265	Daphne Double
Otago Central	Jack George		2,305	Brian Griffiths
Otaki	Allan McCready		3,575	Glen Herbert
Pahiatua	Keith Holyoake		5,291	F M O'Brien
Pakuranga	Bob Tizard		2,259	Victor David Thompson
Palmerston North	Bill Brown		259	Joe Walding
Petone	Mick Moohan		2,607	Joe Miller
Piako	Geoffrey Sim	Jack Luxton	3,884	Myles Edward Barroclough
Porirua	Henry May		1,928	Rick Stevenson
Raglan	Douglas Carter		1,659	Ronald Nelson Little
Rangiora	Lorrie Pickering		957	Te Rino Tirikatene
Rangitikei	Norman Shelton		4,005	Russell Wiseman
Remuera	Ronald Algie	Allan Highet	6,660	Bill Nairn
Riccarton	Mick Connelly		2,725	Ian Wilson
Rodney	Jack Scott		2,722	Nevern McConachy
Roskill	Arthur Faulkner		3,822	Anthony Cook
Rotorua	Harry Lapwood		2,298	Frank Knipe
St Albans	Bert Walker		2,575	Ted Adcock
St Kilda	Bill Fraser		2,809	R M Hall
Selwyn	John McAlpine	Colin McLachlan	2,597	Thomas Kelvin Campbell
Stratford	David Thomson		4,115	David Butler
Sydenham	Mabel Howard		3,947	Helen Garrett
Tamaki	Robert Muldoon		2,827	Kevin Ryan
Taupo	Rona Stevenson		258	Barry Gustafson
Tauranga	George Walsh		2,299	Olive Smuts-Kennedy
Timaru	Sir Basil Arthur		3,108	Norman Stanley Brown
Waimarino	Roy Jack		2,491	Shaun Alex Cameron
Waipa	Leslie Munro		3,081	Neil Roger David Shewan
Wairarapa	Haddon Donald		533	Jack Williams
Waitakere	Martyn Finlay		3,813	Peter Wilkinson
Waitaki	Allan Dick		2,009	Stan Rodger
Waitemata	Norman King		3,832	Terry Power
Waitomo	David Seath		4,442	Arthur John Ingram
Wallace	Brian Talboys		3,965	Aubrey Begg
Wanganui	George Spooner		908	John Grace
Wellington Central	Dan Riddiford		1,713	Rolland O'Regan
Westland	Paddy Blanchfield		4,041	George Ferguson
Māori electorates
Eastern Maori	Puti Tipene Watene		3,121	Arnold Reedy
Northern Maori	Matiu Rata		4,297	F R Wilcox
Southern Maori	Eruera Tirikatene		3,832	Baden Pere
Western Maori	Iriaka Rātana		5,580	Timi Te Heuheu

== By-elections during 35th Parliament ==
There were a number of changes during the term of the 35th Parliament.

Electorate and by-election		Date	Incumbent	Cause	Winner
Southern Maori	1967	11 March	Sir Eruera Tirikātene	Death	Whetu Tirikatene-Sullivan
Fendalton	1967	15 April	Harry Lake	Death	Eric Holland
Petone	1967	15 April	Michael Moohan	Death	Fraser Colman
Eastern Maori	1967	12 August	Puti Tipene Watene	Death	Paraone Reweti
Palmerston North	1967	2 December	Bill Brown	Death	Joe Walding
Hutt	1968	3 August	Sir Walter Nash	Death	Trevor Young
