= 1966 New Zealand general election =

- 26 November 1966

80 seats in the Parliament 41 seats needed for a majority
- Turnout: 1,205,095 (86.0%) ▼
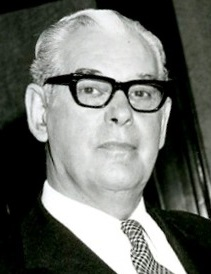

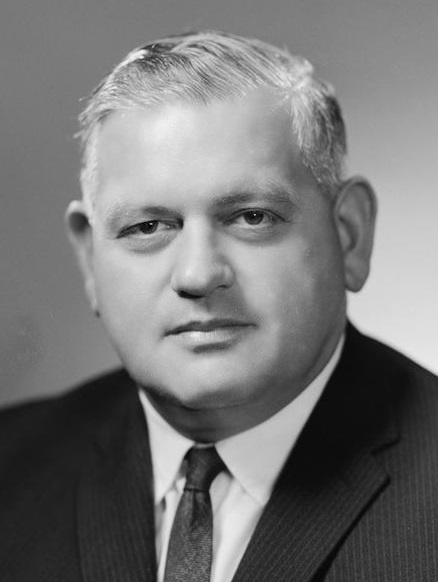

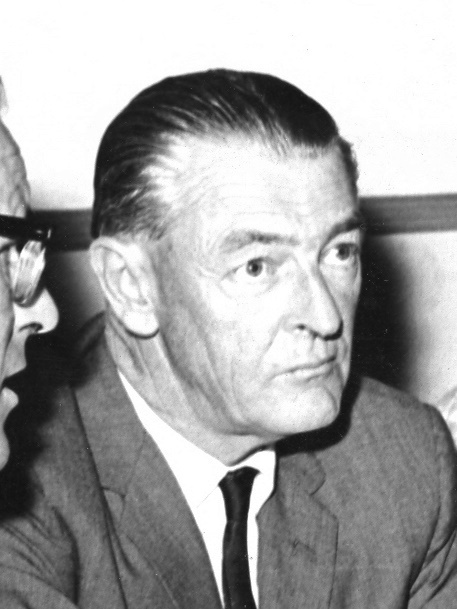
	First party	Second party	Third party
Leader	Keith Holyoake	Norman Kirk	Vernon Cracknell
Party	National	Labour	Social Credit
Leader since	13 August 1957	9 December 1965	12 May 1963
Leader's seat	Pahiatua	Lyttelton	Hobson
Last election	45 seats, 47.1%	35 seats, 43.7%	0 seats, 7.9%
Seats won	44	35	1
Seat change	▼1	Steady	▲1
Popular vote	525,925	499,392	174,513
Percentage	43.6%	41.4%	14.5%
Swing	▼3.5%	▼2.3%	▲6.6%
- Results by electorate, shaded by winning margin
Prime Minister before election
Keith Holyoake
National
Subsequent Prime Minister
Keith Holyoake
National

The 1966 New Zealand general election was a nationwide vote to determine the shape of the New Zealand Parliament's 35th term. It saw the governing National Party win a third consecutive term in office.

It was also the first time since the 1943 election that a minor party (Social Credit Party) won a seat in Parliament.

== Background ==
The National Party had established its second administration following the 1960 elections, and had been re-elected in the 1963 election. Keith Holyoake remained Prime Minister. The Labour Party experienced a leadership change shortly before the 1966 elections: Arnold Nordmeyer, who was closely associated with an unpopular previous Labour government, was replaced by the younger Norman Kirk. Labour remained disunited, however, with ongoing leadership problems undermining Kirk's position. Disagreement between unionists and non-unionists regarding economic policy also weakened the party.

One significant issue that divided National and Labour in the 1966 elections was the question of New Zealand's participation in the Vietnam War. Under National, New Zealand contributed a small number of troops, which Holyoake strongly defended during the election campaign. Labour, by contrast, made the recall of troops one of its key policies; former Labour leader Walter Nash was a particularly strong critic of the war. Nash believed that Labour's failure to win the election was because of its principled anti-Vietnam war policy, despite voters preferring Labour's economic policy to National's.

=== MPs retiring in 1966 ===
Eight National MPs and two Labour MPs intended to retire at the end of the 34th Parliament.

Party	Name	Electorate
National	Geoff Gerard	Ashburton
National	William Sheat	Egmont
National	Blair Tennent	Manawatu
National	Ernest Aderman	New Plymouth
National	Dean Eyre	North Shore
National	Geoffrey Sim	Piako
National	Ronald Algie	Remuera
National	John McAlpine	Selwyn
Labour	Jim Edwards	Napier
Labour	Rex Mason	New Lynn

== The election ==
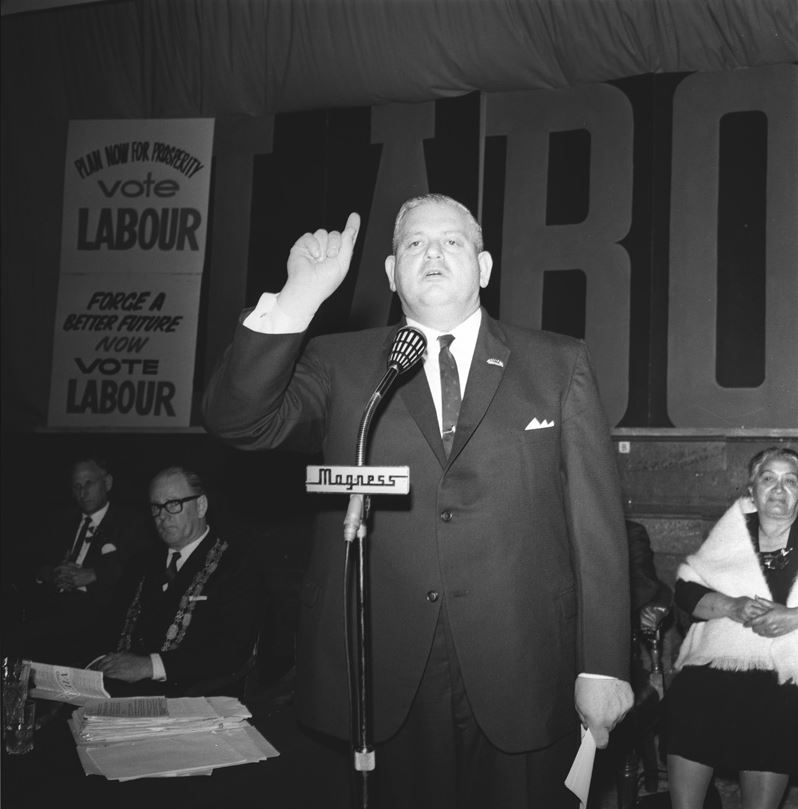
Kirk opening Labour's campaign

The date for the main 1966 elections was 26 November. 1,409,600 people were registered to vote. Turnout was 86.0%, a number relatively low for the time. The number of seats being contested was 80, a number which had been fixed since 1902. It was, however, the last election in which the number of seats was set at this level.

== Election results ==
=== Party standings ===
The 1966 election saw the governing National Party retain office by an eight-seat margin. It had previously held office by a ten-seat margin — the drop was a result of losing the Hobson seat to Social Credit's Vernon Cracknell. National won a total of forty-four seats, while the Labour Party remained static on thirty-five. In the popular vote, the parties were closer — National won 43.6% to Labour's 41.4%. The Social Credit Party won 14.5% of the vote and one seat.

Election results
Party	Candidates	Total votes	Percentage	Seats won	Change
National	80	525,945	43.64	44	−1
Labour	80	499,392	41.44	35	±0
Social Credit	80	174,513	14.48	1	+1
Communist	8	3,167	0.26	0	±0
Democratic	4	1,916	0.15	0	±0
Independents	9	3,327	0.27	0	±0
Total	261	1,205,095		80	

=== Votes summary ===
Popular Vote
National	43.64%
Labour	41.44%
Social Credit	14.48%
Other	0.70%

Parliament seats
National	55.00%
Labour	43.75%
Social Credit	1.25%

=== Initial MPs ===
The table below shows the results of the 1966 general election:

Key

National Labour Social Credit

Electorate results for the 1966 New Zealand general election
Electorate	Incumbent	Winner	Majority	Runner up
General electorates
Ashburton	Geoff Gerard	Rob Talbot	983	John Srhoy
Auckland Central	Norman Douglas		2,562	Marie Quinn
Avon	John Mathison		5,232	Dick Dawson
Awarua	Gordon Grieve		3,222	M E Booker
Bay of Plenty	Percy Allen		3,596	Len Fischer
Buller	Bill Rowling		1,822	Ernie King
Christchurch Central	Robert Macfarlane		1,409	Fred Francis
Clutha	Peter Gordon		3,312	Les McKay
Dunedin Central	Brian MacDonell		1,245	John Farry
Dunedin North	Ethel McMillan		2,833	George Barry Gerard
Eden	John Rae		2,548	John William Stewart
Egmont	William Sheat	Venn Young	3,262	Noel Johnston
Fendalton	Harry Lake		2,271	Bruce Barclay
Franklin	Alfred E. Allen		5,083	Ron Ng-Waishing
Gisborne	Esme Tombleson		1,432	Bob MacDonald
Grey Lynn	Ritchie Macdonald		4,399	Horace Alexander Nash
Hamilton	Lance Adams-Schneider		2,225	Bob Reese
Hastings	Duncan MacIntyre		2,129	Sonja Davies
Hauraki	Arthur Kinsella		2,336	Henry Uttinger
Hawkes Bay	Richard Harrison		3,915	L K Evans
Heretaunga	Ron Bailey		2,647	Ian Ross
Hobson	Logan Sloane	Vernon Cracknell	490	Logan Sloane
Hutt	Sir Walter Nash		1,949	John Kennedy-Good
Invercargill	Ralph Hanan		2,396	Noel Valentine
Island Bay	Arnold Nordmeyer		2,806	Saul Goldsmith
Karori	Jack Marshall		5,270	Peter Blizard
Lyttelton	Norman Kirk		2,121	Peter de Latour
Manawatu	Blair Tennent	Les Gandar	2,298	Ernie Hemmingsen
Manukau	Colin Moyle		2,728	Max Louis Peers
Manurewa	Phil Amos		2,389	B F Kimpton
Marlborough	Tom Shand		732	Gerry Wall
Marsden	Don McKay		4,077	Owen James Lewis
Miramar	Bill Fox	Bill Young	146	Bill Fox
Mt Albert	Warren Freer		2,654	Tom Hibbert
Napier	Jim Edwards	Gordon Christie	393	Maurice Kidson
Nelson	Stan Whitehead		2,045	Edwin Slack
New Lynn	Rex Mason	Jonathan Hunt	3,727	Kevin Patrick Lynch
New Plymouth	Ernest Aderman	Ron Barclay	78	Brian Clark
North Shore	Dean Eyre	George Gair	1,108	Michael Bassett
Onehunga	Hugh Watt		4,265	Daphne Double
Otago Central	Jack George		2,305	Brian Griffiths
Otaki	Allan McCready		3,575	Glen Herbert
Pahiatua	Keith Holyoake		5,291	F M O'Brien
Pakuranga	Bob Tizard		2,259	Victor David Thompson
Palmerston North	Bill Brown		259	Joe Walding
Petone	Mick Moohan		2,607	Joe Miller
Piako	Geoffrey Sim	Jack Luxton	3,884	Myles Edward Barroclough
Porirua	Henry May		1,928	Rick Stevenson
Raglan	Douglas Carter		1,659	Ronald Nelson Little
Rangiora	Lorrie Pickering		957	Te Rino Tirikatene
Rangitikei	Norman Shelton		4,005	Russell Wiseman
Remuera	Ronald Algie	Allan Highet	6,660	Bill Nairn
Riccarton	Mick Connelly		2,725	Ian Wilson
Rodney	Jack Scott		2,722	Nevern McConachy
Roskill	Arthur Faulkner		3,822	Anthony Cook
Rotorua	Harry Lapwood		2,298	Frank Knipe
St Albans	Bert Walker		2,575	Ted Adcock
St Kilda	Bill Fraser		2,809	R M Hall
Selwyn	John McAlpine	Colin McLachlan	2,597	Thomas Kelvin Campbell
Stratford	David Thomson		4,115	David Butler
Sydenham	Mabel Howard		3,947	Helen Garrett
Tamaki	Robert Muldoon		2,827	Kevin Ryan
Taupo	Rona Stevenson		258	Barry Gustafson
Tauranga	George Walsh		2,299	Olive Smuts-Kennedy
Timaru	Sir Basil Arthur		3,108	Norman Stanley Brown
Waimarino	Roy Jack		2,491	Shaun Alex Cameron
Waipa	Leslie Munro		3,081	Neil Roger David Shewan
Wairarapa	Haddon Donald		533	Jack Williams
Waitakere	Martyn Finlay		3,813	Peter Wilkinson
Waitaki	Allan Dick		2,009	Stan Rodger
Waitemata	Norman King		3,832	Terry Power
Waitomo	David Seath		4,442	Arthur John Ingram
Wallace	Brian Talboys		3,965	Aubrey Begg
Wanganui	George Spooner		908	John Grace
Wellington Central	Dan Riddiford		1,713	Rolland O'Regan
Westland	Paddy Blanchfield		4,041	George Ferguson
Māori electorates
Eastern Maori	Puti Tipene Watene		3,121	Arnold Reedy
Northern Maori	Matiu Rata		4,297	F R Wilcox
Southern Maori	Eruera Tirikatene		3,832	Baden Pere
Western Maori	Iriaka Rātana		5,580	Timi Te Heuheu
