= Ritchie Macdonald =

New Zealand politician

Ritchie Macdonald OBE JP
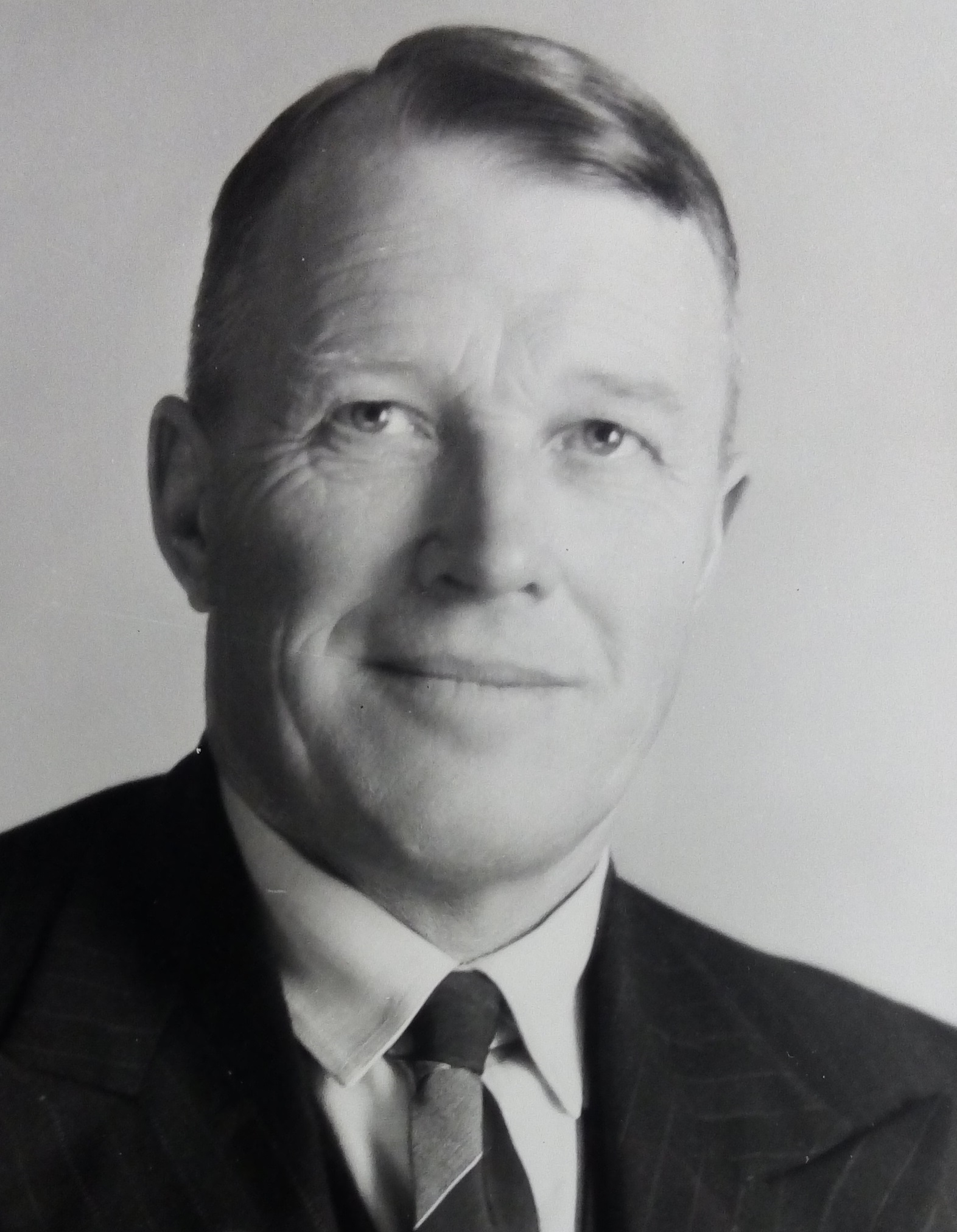

Member of the New Zealand Parliament for Grey Lynn
- In office 30 November 1963 – 29 November 1969
- Preceded by: Reginald Keeling
- Succeeded by: Eddie Isbey

Member of the New Zealand Parliament for Ponsonby
- In office 27 November 1946 – 30 November 1963
- Preceded by: seat established
- Succeeded by: seat abolished

Personal details
- Born: 8 September 1895 Scotland
- Died: 14 March 1987 (aged 91) Auckland, New Zealand
- Party: Labour
- Spouse: Gertrude Wilson (m. 1930; died 1947)

Ritchie Macdonald OBE JP (8 September 1895 – 14 March 1987) was a New Zealand politician of the Labour Party.

== Biography ==
=== Early life and career ===
He was born in Scotland. In 1930 he married Gertrude Wilson. After farming in the Waikato, he worked at the Otahuhu Railway Workshops and became a secretary for the local branch of the New Zealand Railways Union.

=== Political career ===
New Zealand Parliament
| Years | Term | Electorate | Party |
|---|---|---|---|
| 1946–1949 | 28th | Ponsonby | Labour |
| 1949–1951 | 29th | Ponsonby | Labour |
| 1951–1954 | 30th | Ponsonby | Labour |
| 1954–1957 | 31st | Ponsonby | Labour |
| 1957–1960 | 32nd | Ponsonby | Labour |
| 1960–1963 | 33rd | Ponsonby | Labour |
| 1963–1966 | 34th | Grey Lynn | Labour |
| 1966–1969 | 35th | Grey Lynn | Labour |

At the 1938, 1941 and 1944 local-body elections he was a Labour candidate for seats on the One Tree Hill Borough Council and Auckland Hospital Board. He was unsuccessful in each attempt.

He represented the Ponsonby electorate from 1946 to 1963, and then the Grey Lynn electorate from 1963 to 1969, when he retired. Union secretary Tom Skinner was resentful of the fact that Macdonald had won the nomination for the safe seat of Ponsonby whilst he had been allocated the more marginal seat of Tamaki. From 1958 to 1966 Macdonald was Labour's junior whip.

In 1953, Macdonald was awarded the Queen Elizabeth II Coronation Medal.

During the Second Labour Government (1957–60) Labour held a working majority of one causing the party whips to impose strict discipline for attendance in the house to avoid the government losing a division. Consequently, National and Labour MPs were paired in absences. Macdonald and National's Gordon Grieve were scheduled to make an official trip to Antarctica but their flight was turned back to land in Christchurch due to bad weather. The same day cabinet minister Hugh Watt was unexpectedly hospitalised and unable to attend a sitting, meaning the government was in danger of losing a vote. Prime Minister Walter Nash authorised an immediate Air Force transport craft to fly to Christchurch to bring Macdonald back to Wellington (and leave Grieve there) to make sure the government had the numbers. However a vote was never taken.

Macdonald was skilled at engaging with labourers and factory workers more effectively than most of his more intellectual caucus colleagues who considered him a lightweight, but Warren Freer said that he possessed a "common touch". Macdonald was one of the few senior Labour MPs who backed Norman Kirk as leader. He considered Kirk the most democratic leader Labour had ever had and appreciated how he let caucus members openly "say their piece" in ways never allowed under Fraser, Nash or Nordmeyer, and he regretted that the newer (and future) Labour MPs would be unable to make this comparison.

The then Mayor of Auckland Sir Dove-Myer Robinson said about him when he retired: "His is the old style of personal assistance. The majority of modern politicians do not know what that means."

Robert Chapman said that the Parliamentary superannuation scheme (introduced in 1946) .... encouraged thoughts of retirement even among Labour's sempiternal back-benchers for, after all, Ritchie Macdonald did retire, not die, in the end.

=== Later life and death ===
In 1970, Macdonald was appointed a member of the board of trustees of the Auckland Savings Bank. In the 1973 Queen's Birthday Honours, he was appointed an Officer of the Order of the British Empire, for services to the community.

Macdonald died at his home in One Tree Hill on 14 March 1987, aged 91, and his body was cremated at Purewa Crematorium.

== Notes ==
New Zealand Parliament
| Preceded by Reginald Keeling | Member of Parliament for Grey Lynn; 1963–1969 | Succeeded by Eddie Isbey |
| New constituency | Member of Parliament for Ponsonby; 1946–1963 | Constituency abolished |
