= Neill Austin =

New Zealand politician

Howard Neill Austin MBE (12 December 1924 – 24 June 2008) was a New Zealand politician of the National Party. He held many positions with Federated Farmers.

== Early life ==
Austin was born in 1924 in Rawene, a town on the south side of the Hokianga harbour. His father was William Neill Austin. He received his education at Okaihau District High School (now Okaihau College). In 1946, he married Violet Mudgway, the daughter of Herbert Lewis Mudgway; the couple were to have three daughters.

== Outside politics ==
Austin was a member of the Umawera School committee from 1956 to 1962. He was on the executive of the Umawera Settlers' Association, and chaired the group from 1960 to 1965. He was a member of the Waihou Memorial Church committee from 1968; Waihou is a locality west of Kaitaia. Austin was on the Auckland Provincial Executive of Federated Farmers from 1969 to 1975, and was president of the Bay of Islands branch of the group from 1970 to 1975. From 1971 to 1975, he was a member of the Council of the Dominion Dairy Section of Federated Farmers.

== Political career ==
New Zealand Parliament
Years	Term	Electorate	Party
1975–1978	38th	Hobson	National
1978–1981	39th	Bay of Islands	National
1981–1984	40th	Bay of Islands	National
1984–1987	41st	Bay of Islands	National

He represented the Hobson electorate from 1975 to 1978, and then the Bay of Islands electorate from 1978.

During his time at Parliament he was known by his nickname "Old Blackberry" for successfully lobbying for public funding for farmers to eradicate the spread of wild blackberry which had become a noxious weed.

In 1986 Austin was deselected by the National Party in favour of John Carter, the party electorate chairman. He briefly considered resigning and forcing a by-election and standing as an independent, but decided against it. He also ruled out standing at the 1987 election against Carter as he had signed a candidates pledge not to do so. Austin's son-in-law, tutor Chris Robertson, stood in the seat against Carter as the Labour Party candidate.

== Later life ==
In the 1994 Queen's Birthday Honours, Austin was appointed a Member of the Order of the British Empire, for public services. He died on 24 June 2008.

New Zealand Parliament
Preceded by Logan Sloane	Member of Parliament for Hobson; 1975–1978	In abeyance Title next held by Ross Meurant
In abeyance Title last held by Sidney Walter Smith	Member of Parliament for Bay of Islands; 1978–1987	Succeeded by John Carter
