= 1963 New Zealand general election =

- 30 November 1963

All 80 seats in the New Zealand Parliament 41 seats were needed for a majority
- Turnout: 1,196,631 (89.6%) ▼
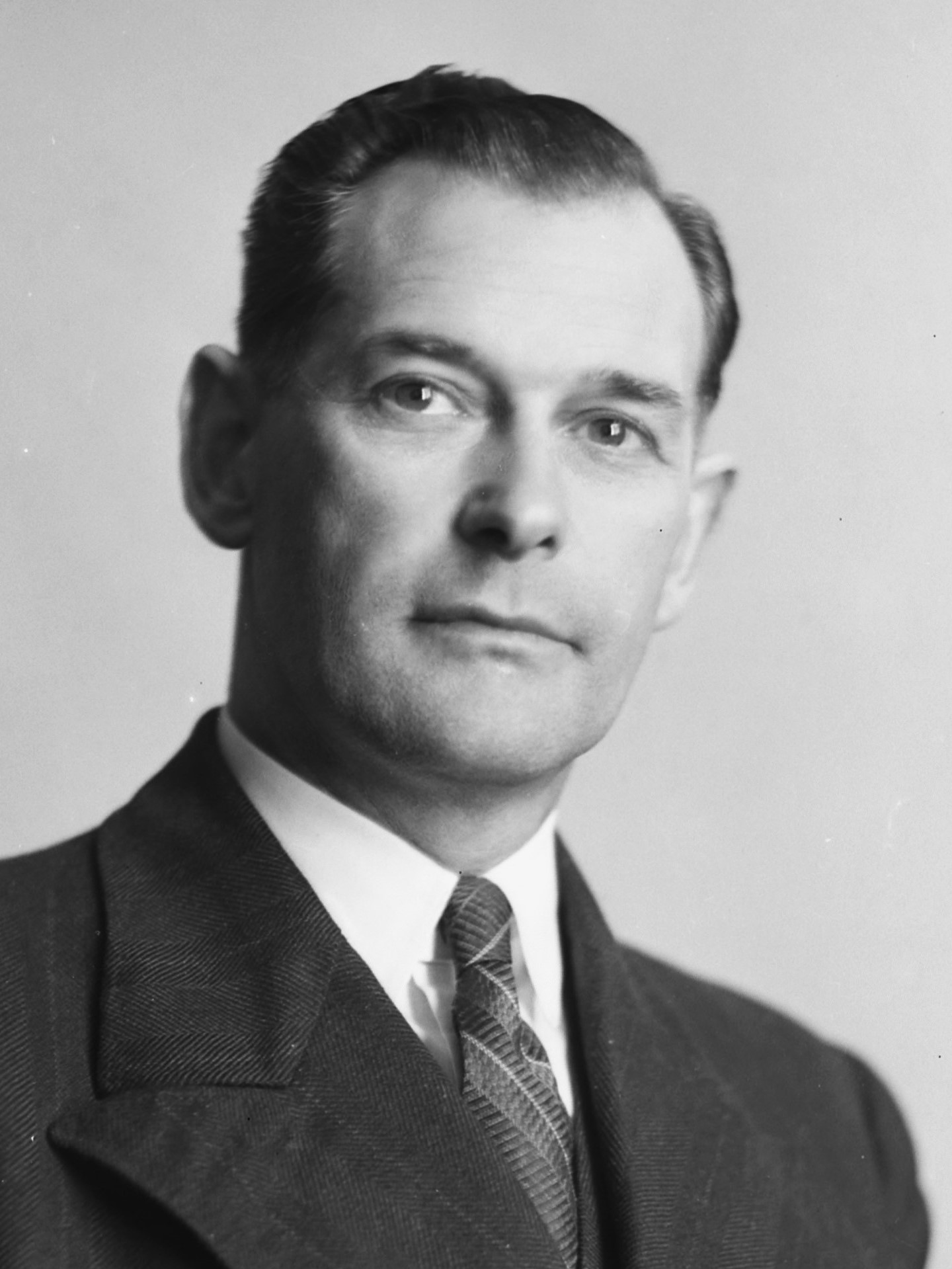

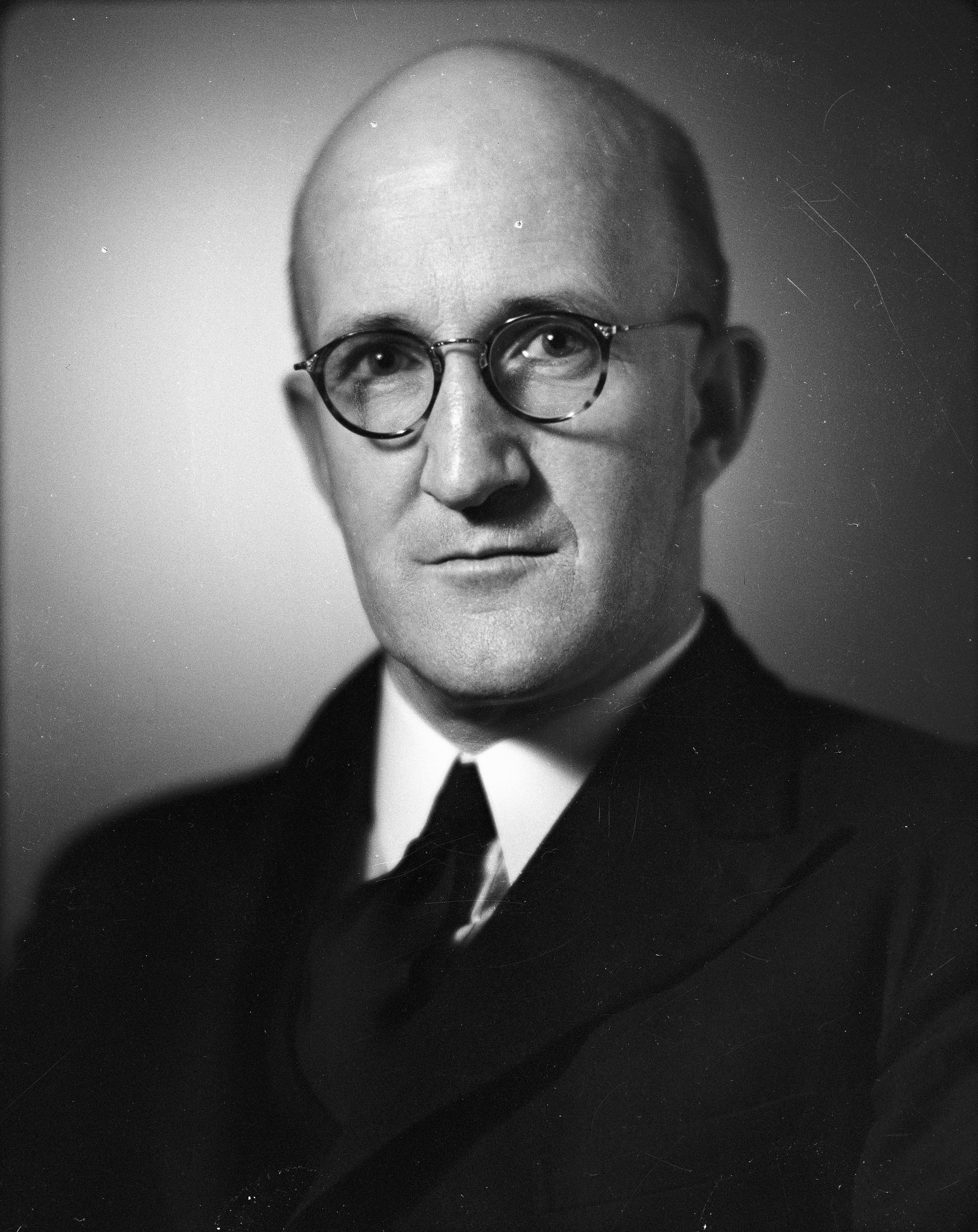
	First party	Second party
Leader	Keith Holyoake	Arnold Nordmeyer
Party	National	Labour
Leader since	13 August 1957	1 April 1963
Leader's seat	Pahiatua	Island Bay
Last election	46 seats, 47.6%	34 seats, 43.4%
Seats won	45	35
Seat change	▼1	▲1
Popular vote	563,875	524,066
Percentage	47.1%	43.7%
Swing	▼0.5%	▲0.6%
- Results by electorate, shaded by winning margin
Prime Minister before election
Keith Holyoake
National
Subsequent Prime Minister
Keith Holyoake
National

The 1963 New Zealand general election was a nationwide vote to determine the shape of New Zealand Parliament's 34th term. The results were almost identical to those of the previous election, and the governing National Party remained in office.

== Background ==
The 1960 election had been won by the National Party, beginning New Zealand's second period of National government. Keith Holyoake, who had briefly been prime minister at the end of the first period, returned to office. The elderly leader of the Labour Party, Walter Nash, had agreed to step down following his government's defeat, but disliked the prospect of being succeeded by his Minister of Finance, Arnold Nordmeyer. Nash instead backed first Jerry Skinner and then, after Skinner's death, Fred Hackett. In the end, however, Nordmeyer was victorious. Nordmeyer, however, was unpopular with the general public, being remembered with hostility for the tax hikes in his so-called 'Black Budget'. Labour struggled to overcome this negative perception of its leader, and was only partially successful.

There had been an unusually large number of by-elections during the term of the 33rd Parliament. None of these had resulted in any upsets, and there was no major indications from the population wanting a change. National held two seats Hurunui and Waitaki, but by reduced margins. The party organisation was also acutely aware that National's win in 1960 was mostly due to public mood against Labour, rather than endorsement of National, and put work in to improving their campaigning. Benefits were seen sooner than expected picking up swings (but not winning) against Labour in two by-elections in the two Labour held seats of Buller and Northern Maori.

Holyoake started his election campaign on 4 November, not even a month out from the election. Whilst television had just been introduced in New Zealand, the election campaign was a dull affair and, from 23 November, the Assassination of John F. Kennedy was the dominant topic in the media.

=== MPs retiring in 1963 ===
Five National MPs and two Labour MPs intended to retire at the end of the 33rd Parliament.

Party	Name	Electorate
National	Cyril Harker	Hawke's Bay
National	Stan Goosman	Piako
National	Thomas Murray	Stratford
National	Hallyburton Johnstone	Waipa
National	Bert Cooksley	Wairarapa
Labour	Phil Connolly	Dunedin Central
Labour	Tiaki Omana	Eastern Maori

== The election ==
The date for the main 1963 elections was 30 November. 1,345,836 people were registered to vote, and turnout was 89.6%. This turnout was around average for the time. The number of seats being contested was 80, a number which had been fixed since 1902.

The following new (or reconstituted) electorates were introduced in 1963: Manurewa, New Lynn, Pakuranga, Porirua, Rangiora, Taupo and Waimarino.

== Results ==
The 1963 election saw the governing National Party retain office by a ten-seat margin. It had previously held office by a twelve-seat margin. National won a total of forty-five seats, while the Labour Party won thirty-five. In the popular vote, National won 47.1% to Labour's 43.7%. The Social Credit Party won 7.9% of the vote, but no seats, although their leader Vernon Cracknell came close to winning Hobson, but ultimately lost due to special votes. Four of their candidates also missed the nomination deadline. One political analyst, Professor Robert Chapman, called it "the no change election".

Puti Tipene Watene was elected for Eastern Maori; he was a Mormon and was the first non-Ratana to win a Maori seat since 1938.

Election results
Party	Candidates	Total votes	Percentage	Seats won	Change
National	80	563,875	47.1	45	-1
Labour	80	524,066	43.7	35	+1
Social Credit	76	95,176	7.9	0	±0
Liberal	23	10,339	0.9	0	±0
Communist	22	3,167	0.3	0	±0
Others	9	1,422	0.1	0	±0
Total	290	1,196,631		80	

=== Votes summary ===
Popular Vote
National	47.10%
Labour	43.70%
Social Credit	7.90%
Others	1.30%

Parliament seats
National	56.25%
Labour	43.75%

The table below shows the results of the 1963 general election:

Key

National Labour Social Credit

Electorate results for the 1963 New Zealand general election
Electorate	Incumbent	Winner	Majority	Runner up
General electorates
Ashburton	Geoff Gerard		3,419	Albert George Braddick
Auckland Central	Norman Douglas		3,227	John Strevens
Avon	John Mathison		5,117	Stan Dodwell
Awarua	Gordon Grieve		3,373	Noel Valentine
Bay of Plenty	Percy Allen		3,025	Peter Riden
Buller	Bill Rowling		1,671	Ernie King
Christchurch Central	Robert Macfarlane		1,915	Dave Patchett
Clutha	Peter Gordon		3,595	Les McKay
Dunedin Central	Phil Connolly	Brian MacDonell	1,170	George Robert Thorn
Dunedin North	Ethel McMillan		2,524	Edgar Whittleston
Eden	John Rae		3,335	Frank Knipe
Egmont	William Sheat		3,047	John Seddon
Fendalton	Harry Lake		2,740	Bruce Barclay
Franklin	Alfred E. Allen		5,848	Ron Ng-Waishing
Gisborne	Esme Tombleson		902	Bob MacDonald
Grey Lynn	Reginald Keeling	Ritchie Macdonald	5,240	Jolyon Firth
Hamilton	Lance Adams-Schneider		2,642	J M Cairns
Hastings	Duncan MacIntyre		1,944	Ted Keating
Hauraki	Arthur Kinsella		2,873	George Broad
Hawkes Bay	Cyril Harker	Richard Harrison	3,518	John Woolf
Heretaunga	Ron Bailey		2,135	Bob Kimmins
Hobson	Logan Sloane		31	Vernon Cracknell (Note: Vernon Cracknell was first on election night, but lost when special votes were included)
Hutt	Walter Nash		3,648	Vere Hampson-Tindale
Invercargill	Ralph Hanan		1,934	Oliver James Henderson
Island Bay	Arnold Nordmeyer		2,388	Fairlie Curry
Karori	Jack Marshall		4,020	Keith Spry
Lyttelton	Norman Kirk		2,677	Tom Flint
Manawatu	Blair Tennent		2,513	Leonard Thomas Fischer
Manukau	Leon Götz	Colin Moyle	759	Henry Christopher Pryor
Manurewa	New electorate	Phil Amos	1,524	Leon Götz
Marlborough	Tom Shand		2,111	Bill Kenyon
Marsden	Don McKay		3,942	Owen James Lewis
Miramar	Bill Fox		416	Bill Young
Mt Albert	Warren Freer		3,018	Jeffrey Lloyd Reid
Napier	Jim Edwards		785	D'Arcy Ormonde Haskell
Nelson	Stan Whitehead		2,610	Peter Malone
New Lynn	New electorate	Rex Mason	3,052	Charles Alexander McLeod
New Plymouth	Ernest Aderman		474	Ron Barclay
North Shore	Dean Eyre		2,757	Reginald Keeling
Onehunga	Hugh Watt		5,127	J P Mason
Otago Central	Jack George		2,675	Stan Rodger
Otaki	Allan McCready		3,014	George McDonald
Pahiatua	Keith Holyoake		5,733	Ernie Hemmingsen
Pakuranga	New electorate	Bob Tizard	2,015	Roland Neville-White
Palmerston North	Bill Brown		772	Philip Skoglund
Petone	Mick Moohan		2,448	Peter Love
Piako	Stan Goosman	Geoffrey Sim	5,526	Neil Shewan
Porirua	New electorate	Henry May	3,161	Joseph W. Miller
Raglan	Douglas Carter		1,850	Henry Uttinger
Rangiora	New electorate	Lorrie Pickering	1,425	Te Rino Tirikatene
Rangitikei	Norman Shelton		4,307	Russell Wiseman
Remuera	Ronald Algie		7,001	Fred Goodall
Riccarton	Mick Connelly		2,550	Ian Wilson
Rodney	Jack Scott		4,320	Chris Pickett
Roskill	Arthur Faulkner		3,216	Thomas Tucker
Rotorua	Harry Lapwood		2,217	James Phillip Cranston
Selwyn	John McAlpine		3,371	Francis Edward Smith
St Albans	Bert Walker		2,501	John Palmer
St Kilda	Bill Fraser		2,597	Kevin John Marlow
Stratford	Thomas Murray	David Thomson	4,590	J McLafferty
Sydenham	Mabel Howard		5,399	Derek Quigley
Tamaki	Robert Muldoon		3,754	Norman Finch
Taupo	New electorate	Rona Stevenson	275	Jack Ingram
Tauranga	George Walsh		4,545	Gordon Hardaker
Timaru	Sir Basil Arthur		2,831	Maurice John O'Reilly
Waimarino	New electorate	Roy Jack	1,785	Olive Smuts-Kennedy
Waipa	Hallyburton Johnstone	Leslie Munro	3,165	Ronald Nelson Little
Wairarapa	Bert Cooksley	Haddon Donald	501	Jack Williams
Waitaki	Allan Dick		2,019	K S Lysaght
Waitakere	Rex Mason	Martyn Finlay	2,895	Horace Alexander Nash
Waitemata	Norman King		2,919	Butch Pugh
Waitomo	David Seath		4,655	H C Brown
Wallace	Brian Talboys		5,740	John Reid
Wanganui	George Spooner		1,397	John Grace
Wellington Central	Dan Riddiford		1,508	Frank Kitts
Westland	Paddy Blanchfield		4,925	Winston Reynolds
Māori electorates
Eastern Maori	Tiaki Omana	Puti Tipene Watene	2,566	Arnold Reedy
Northern Maori	Matiu Rata		2,123	James Henare
Southern Maori	Eruera Tirikatene		4,978	Ben Couch
Western Maori	Iriaka Rātana		5,096	Pei Te Hurinui Jones

== Works cited ==
- Gustafson, Barry (1986). The First 50 Years : A History of the New Zealand National Party. Auckland: Reed Methuen. ISBN 0-474-00177-6.
- Gustafson, Barry (2007). Kiwi Keith: a biography of Keith Holyoake. Auckland: Auckland University Press. ISBN 978-1-86940-400-0.
- Norton, Clifford (1988). New Zealand Parliamentary Election Results 1946–1987: Occasional Publications No 1, Department of Political Science. Wellington: Victoria University of Wellington. ISBN 0-475-11200-8.
- Sinclair, Keith (1976). Walter Nash. Auckland: Oxford University Press. ISBN 0-19-647949-5.
- Wilson, Jim (1985) [First published in 1913]. New Zealand Parliamentary Record, 1840–1984 (4th ed.). Wellington: V.R. Ward, Govt. Printer. OCLC 154283103.
