= William Young (New Zealand politician) =

New Zealand politician (1876–1959)

William Young (1876 – 13 May 1959) of Otahuti in the Southland District was appointed a member of the New Zealand Legislative Council on 22 June 1950.

== Biography ==
Young was born in Waianiwa in 1876 and was educated at the Waianiwa school before he took up farming in the area. He was active in the farming industry and was a director of both the New Zealand Marketing Association and Southland Cool Stores. For 20 years he was chairman of the Drummond Dairy Factory and also for a time chairman of the Farmers' Dairy Federation. In addition to farming he was involved with community organisations in Southland. He was a member of the Waimatuku River Board, Isla Bank School Committee and for 12 years with the Isla Bank Hall Committee.

He was appointed as a member of the suicide squad nominated by the First National Government in 1950 to vote for the abolition of the council. Most of the new members (like Young) were appointed on 22 June 1950, and served until 31 December 1950 when the council was abolished. Young was a farmer in Otahuti.

After retiring he left his farm and moved to Invercargill. He died on 13 May 1959, aged 83, and was survived by his wife, son and three daughters. One of his daughters, Ena, was married to Awarua MP Gordon Grieve.
