= Bert Cooksley =

New Zealand politician

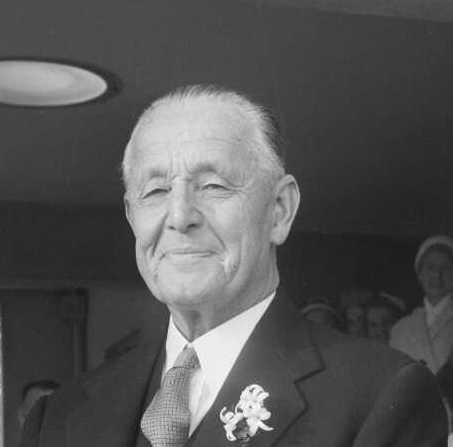
Cooksley in 1957

Bert Victor Cooksley OBE MM (born "Bertie"; 13 July 1892 – 26 July 1980) was a New Zealand politician of the National Party.

New Zealand Parliament
Years	Term	Electorate	Party
1949–1951	29th	Wairarapa	National
1951–1954	30th	Wairarapa	National
1954–1957	31st	Wairarapa	National
1957–1960	32nd	Wairarapa	National
1960–1963	33rd	Wairarapa	National

Cooksley was born in 1892 in Dunsandel, Canterbury. He attended Dunsdale School. He farmed in Taita in the Hutt Valley. He went with the New Zealand Expeditionary Force into World War I and landed at Gallipoli. He gave his birth date as August 1892 (WWI) and August 1894 (WWII), rather than 13 July 1892.

Cooksley was a market vegetable grower and, in 1944, President of the New Zealand Council of Commercial Gardeners. In 1943, he lost the general election for the seat of Otaki, on behalf of the National Party. He represented the Wairarapa electorate from 1949 till 1963, when he retired.

Cooksley was awarded the Military Medal in World War I. In 1953, he received the Queen Elizabeth II Coronation Medal, and he was appointed an Officer of the Order of the British Empire for community service in the 1965 New Year Honours.

Cooksley died at Waikanae in 1980 before cremation and burial in its cemetery.

New Zealand Parliament
Preceded by Ben Roberts	Member of Parliament for Wairarapa; 1949–1963	Succeeded by Haddon Donald
