= Vernon Cracknell =

New Zealand politician

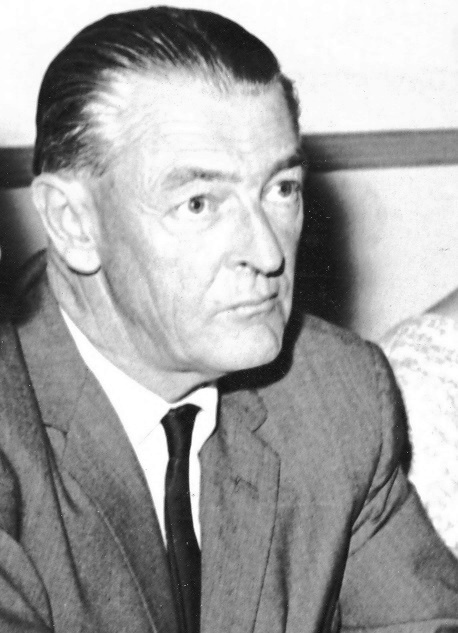

3rd Leader of the Social Credit Party
- In office 12 May 1963 – 24 May 1970
- Deputy: John O'Brien
- Preceded by: P.H. Matthews
- Succeeded by: John O'Brien

Member of the New Zealand Parliament for Hobson
- In office 26 November 1966 – 29 November 1969
- Preceded by: Logan Sloane
- Succeeded by: Logan Sloane

Personal details
- Born: 30 May 1912 Auckland, New Zealand
- Died: 4 June 1989 (aged 77) Kawakawa, New Zealand
- Party: Social Credit
- Spouse: Shelagh Ralston Julius
- Children: 4
- Profession: Accountant

Vernon Francis Cracknell (30 May 1912 – 4 June 1989) was a New Zealand politician. He served as the Social Credit Party's third leader (1963–1970).

== Early life ==
Cracknell was born in Auckland on 30 May 1912. He was educated at Auckland Grammar School and Kings College before qualifying as an accountant. In 1934 he left Auckland and moved to Northland and later married in 1949. He established his own accountancy firm in Kerikeri in 1951.

Later, he became involved in politics through the Social Credit Party, a group dedicated to the social credit theory of monetary reform. He made his entry into politics in local government in 1950 when he was elected a member of the Bay of Islands Harbour Board and became the board's chairman in 1953.

== Biography ==
=== Political career ===
In the 1960 election, Cracknell contested the seat of Hobson in Northland. He placed second, pushing the Labour Party candidate into third place, and won more votes than any other Social Credit candidate. The area had previously been receptive to social credit theory – the Social Credit Party had placed second in the 1954 election, and Harold Rushworth of the credit-influenced Country Party had held the Northland seat (then called Bay of Islands) for three terms, from 1928 to 1938. At the party conference in May 1962 he was elected president of the party. The party was without a permanent leader (which it often was outside of election years) and Cracknell became the main spokesperson for the party as its de facto leader. He was elected the official leader of the party at the 1963 party conference. At the 1963 election he was ahead after the initial election night count by 12 votes. However after special votes were included his small majority was surpassed by the incumbent MP, Logan Sloane of the National Party.

As leader, Cracknell attempted to turn Social Credit into a more professional political organisation. He instigated a more centralised administrative structure and in 1964 the positions of party leader and deputy leader were made permanent to make the party more stable. Membership increased under his leadership reaching 7,000 members becoming the second biggest party in terms of membership (overtaking National and just slightly behind Labour). This was achieved by effective mid-parliamentary term publicity campaigns.

=== Member of Parliament ===
New Zealand Parliament
Years	Term	Electorate	Party
1966–1969	35th	Hobson	Social Credit

In the 1966 election, Cracknell was finally successful, winning the seat with 48% of the vote. He narrowly defeated Sloane, who won 45% of the vote. Cracknell's victory was a surprise, as no candidate not aligned with either the Labour or National parties had been elected to Parliament since 1943. However, Cracknell found himself unsuited to Parliamentary debate and did not make any substantial impact. He struggled to achieve an independent voice in Parliament, voting with Labour 22 times and with National 14 times in his first year. Cracknell was not particularly skilled at dealing with the media and so received little attention, thus undoing Social Credit's foot in the door in terms of political ascendancy. He was a good organiser and recognised for his honesty and respectability. National claimed that Cracknell could have become a cabinet minister if he had joined them rather than Social Credit. Due to his isolation in parliament Cracknell could not rely on any other MPs to second any motion of his but did have to share an office and secretary with an MP from another party. His status as a party leader went unrecognised and was not allocated a front bench seat. He also had the indignity of having his maiden speech deferred.

In the 1969 election, Cracknell's campaign was almost universally regarded as poor, with his television appearance being described as uninteresting, too academic and rambling. Many observers cited growing internal divisions within the Social Credit Party as a cause of this by diverting the party's efforts and attention away from campaigning and policy platforms. The party dropped 5% in the polls and Cracknell likewise did worse in Hobson where Logan Sloane regained the seat by a substantial margin.

=== After Parliament ===
In 1970, a bitter dispute at the party's annual conference saw Cracknell lose the Social Credit Party's leadership to his deputy, the more confrontational John O'Brien. The 1970 conference was described as "the most vivid example of political bloodletting in public" since John A. Lee had been expelled at the 1940 Labour party conference. The culmination of which, a vote was held for the office of party president with a pro-Cracknell and Pro-O'Brien candidate. O'Brien's ally P.J. Dempsy defeated Cracknell man A.J. Gray 137 votes to 60. Seeing this as a sign of things to come, Cracknell smilingly asked the minutes clerk to remove his name from the leadership ballot. He resigned the leadership without a delegate vote leaving O'Brien to gain the leadership, without winning it from him.

Thereafter, Cracknell had little involvement in politics, and did not attempt to regain his seat again. However after O'Brien left the party and was replaced by Bruce Beetham as leader, Cracknell rejoined the party in 1975 and was made 'president emeritus' of the party and gave a speech at that years party conference which helped to calm the party and consolidate the membership around Beetham's leadership. Beetham was elected as Social Credit's second MP three years later.

=== Later life and death ===
He returned to his accountancy practice in Kerikeri before retiring in 1985. In his retirement he raised a herd of 18 Hereford steers.

Cracknell died in Kawakawa in 1989 aged 77 years. His wife Shelagh Ralston Julius, who was a Squadron Leader in the WAAF during the second world war, died in 1993. They were survived by four children and six grandchildren.

== Notes ==
Party political offices
Preceded by P. H. Matthews	Leader of the Social Credit Party; 1963–1970	Succeeded by John O'Brien
New Zealand Parliament
Preceded by Logan Sloane	Member of Parliament for Hobson; 1966–1969	Succeeded by Logan Sloane
