= Bill Fraser (New Zealand politician) =

New Zealand politician

The Honourable Bill Fraser QSO
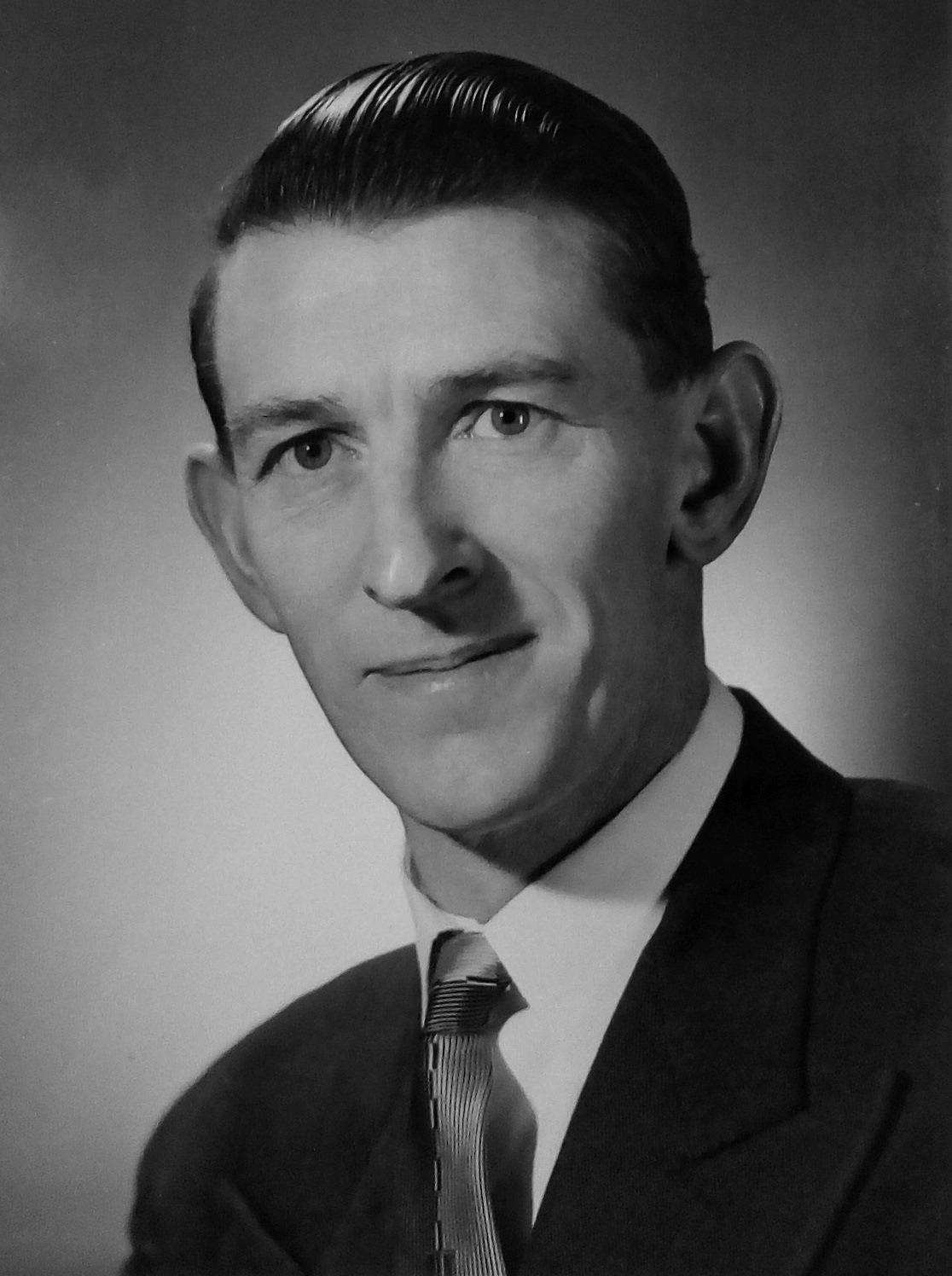
- Fraser in 1957

26th Minister of Defence
- In office 10 September 1974 – 12 December 1975
- Prime Minister: Bill Rowling
- Preceded by: Arthur Faulkner
- Succeeded by: Allan McCready

9th Minister of Housing
- In office 8 December 1972 – 10 September 1974
- Prime Minister: Norman Kirk
- Preceded by: Eric Holland
- Succeeded by: Roger Douglas

Member of the New Zealand Parliament for St Kilda
- In office 30 November 1957 – 28 November 1981
- Preceded by: Jim Barnes
- Succeeded by: Michael Cullen

Personal details
- Born: William Alex Fraser; 28 July 1924 Dunedin, New Zealand
- Died: 13 January 2001 (aged 76) Dunedin, New Zealand
- Party: Labour
- Spouse: Dorothy Tucker
- Children: 2
- Occupation: Builder

Military service
- Branch/service: Royal New Zealand Air Force
- Years of service: 1941–46
- Rank: Warrant Officer
- Unit: No. 5 Squadron
- Battles/wars: World War II

William Alex Fraser QSO (28 July 1924 – 13 January 2001) was a New Zealand politician of the Labour Party.

== Early life and career ==
Fraser was born in Dunedin on 28 July 1924. He attended school at Forbury and King Edward Technical College. His father was a film projectionist and whilst not politically active, was a Labour supporter. In 1938 he became an apprentice carpenter and later worked as a builder. He was also a competent swimmer.

He served in the Royal New Zealand Air Force during World War II. He enlisted in No. 5 Squadron of the Air Training Corps in 1941 and trained at Ohakea as an air gunner. In 1943 he gained his flying badge was posted to the Solomon Islands where he saw action conducting bombings, strafing runs and photographic reconnaissance. He ended the war with the rank of Warrant Officer and was demobilized in May 1946.

While on leave between operational tours, he met Dorothy Tucker at a services club in Gisborne. They married in 1947 and had two children together. He then entered work again as a builder and was a prominent member of the Returned Services' Association.

== Political career ==
New Zealand Parliament
Years	Term	Electorate	Party
1957–1960	32nd	St Kilda	Labour
1960–1963	33rd	St Kilda	Labour
1963–1966	34th	St Kilda	Labour
1966–1969	35th	St Kilda	Labour
1969–1972	36th	St Kilda	Labour
1972–1975	37th	St Kilda	Labour
1975–1978	38th	St Kilda	Labour
1978–1981	39th	St Kilda	Labour

=== Local politics ===
With Dorothy's encouragement he joined the Dunedin South branch of the Labour Party, where he became a delegate to the Otago Labour Representation Committee and became president of the St Kilda Junior Branch. At the 1947 local body elections he stood as a candidate for the St Kilda Borough Council, but was unsuccessful.

In 1953 Fraser was elected a member of the Dunedin City Council serving one three-year term before being defeated in 1956.

=== Member of Parliament ===
He represented the Dunedin electorate of St Kilda from 1957 to 1981, when he retired. He was Dunedin's longest-serving MP. He defeated the popular National MP James Barnes and defeated Barnes again in 1960. A modest and understated man, he was somewhat surprised at his re-election in 1960, even having written a concession speech in advance. Thereafter he increased his majority steadily over his career and turned St Kilda from a marginal seat to a safe Labour seat. Dorothy worked for many years as his unpaid electorate secretary and it was said by contemporaries such as Warren Freer that Fraser was overshadowed by his wife, who was a Dunedin City Councillor and chairperson of the Otago Hospital Board, with many thinking that she was better qualified to be in Parliament than him.

Fraser was a backbencher during the government of Walter Nash before spending 12 years in opposition. During these years he was a trustee of the Otago Savings Bank from 1959 to 1973 and president of the Associated Trustee Banks from 1973 to 1976. He developed a good working relationship with Norman Kirk (whom he shared a flat in Wellington with) and encouraged him to seek the party leadership. Fraser was of the opinion that Labour's leader Arnold Nordmeyer was unelectable. He was aggravated further when Labour MP Jim Edwards (Nordmeyer's son-in-law) confronted both him and fellow Dunedin MP Brian MacDonell saying they needed to improve their performance if they expected to make it in to cabinet if Labour won the 1966 election. The normally reserved Fraser took offence to the threat and told Edwards to shut up. The incident confirmed his opposition to Nordmeyer's leadership.

When Kirk replaced Nordmeyer as leader, Fraser was promoted to be Shadow Minister of Housing and Shadow Postmaster-General. In the lead up to the 1972 election he announced Labour's housing policy of enabling home loans through the State Advances Corporation for people carrying out renovations on state houses to bring them up to standards. The announcement event attracted a unusually large crowd and interest. Two days later it prompted Eric Holland, the Minister of Housing, to announce the government would introduce an identical policy.

=== Cabinet minister ===
He was a Cabinet Minister, serving as Minister of Housing and Minister in charge of Earthquake and War Damage Commission from 1972 to 1974 in the Third Labour Government. As Minister of Housing he oversaw a huge increase in building of state houses to fulfill Labour's election promise to increase rental supply and restore the "Kiwi dream" of home ownership. He overcame formidable hurdles such as lack of funding, a depleted construction industry and uncooperative banking industry. He recounted at the time that one of the biggest hurdles in house construction was the manufacturing of toilet pans and that to keep construction going he had to authorise shipments from Australia and when they arrived half were broken. He also initiated the New Zealand Housing Corporation in 1974 through a merger of the State Advances Corporation and the Housing Division of the Ministry of Works. While the government struggled to keep up with demand for houses there was a major increase in total number of houses constructed, rising from 22,400 in 1971–72 to 31,000 in 1973–74. He also set up rent appeal boards in 1973. He also made several policy changes to allow for more diverse designs and placement of state houses.

When Kirk died in 1974, Bill Rowling succeeded him as Prime Minister. Rowling reshuffled the cabinet and appointed Fraser as Minister of Defence and gave the Housing portfolio to Roger Douglas, but hastened to say the change was not a demotion and that it was due to a lack of experienced ministers with military experience (Fraser's cabinet ranking remained unchanged). However Fraser was on the outer with Rowling and his deputy Bob Tizard and did not enjoy as good a relationship with them as he had with Kirk. The reputation soured further after Rowling later told journalists that he felt Fraser's progress on housing was insufficient and therefore had to go.

After Labour's unexpected defeat in 1975 Fraser remained on the front bench. From 1976 to 1977 he was Shadow Minister of Defence and from 1977 to 1979 he was Shadow Minister of Housing when he opted not to stand for re-election to the Shadow Cabinet. Fraser had not forgiven Rowling for being removed from the Housing portfolio in 1974 and their relationship never improved. This, combined with a new intake of ambitious MPs after Labour's failure to regain government in 1978, led him to believe his future prospects in politics were dim. During this parliamentary term, when there was a leadership challenge to Rowling by David Lange, Fraser was unable to attend the caucus ballot, though was expected to vote for Lange had he been present.

In late 1979 Fraser made the decision, to public surprise, that he would retire from parliament. He stated his main reason for retiring was to spend more time with his family. However, this reasoning was soon confounded when his wife Dorothy announced she was seeking the Labour nomination to succeed him. Dorothy unexpectedly lost the nomination to university lecturer Michael Cullen.

== Later life and death ==
Fraser returned to the building trade. Upon leaving parliament he said "I still have a strong right arm and can wield a hammer." As a former carpenter Fraser occupied time in retirement repairing and renovating Labour's Dunedin South branch office. In 1980 it had been renamed the Bill Fraser Lounge in Fraser's honour. In 2015 the office was damaged in a flood and was refurbished in 2018.

In the 1992 Queen's Birthday Honours, Fraser was appointed a Companion of the Queen's Service Order for public services.

He died aged 76 in Dunedin in 2001, survived by his wife, son and daughter. His ashes were buried in Andersons Bay Cemetery.

Political offices
Preceded by Arthur Faulkner	Minister of Defence; 1974–1975	Succeeded by Allan McCready
Preceded by Eric Holland	Minister of Housing; 1972–1974	Succeeded by Roger Douglas
New Zealand Parliament
Preceded by James Barnes	Member of Parliament for St Kilda; 1957–1981	Succeeded by Michael Cullen
