= Esme Tombleson =

New Zealand politician

Esme Tombleson CBE QSO

Member of the New Zealand Parliament for Gisborne
- In office 1960–1972
- Preceded by: Reginald Keeling
- Succeeded by: Trevor Davey

Personal details
- Born: Esme Irene Lawson; 1 August 1917 Sydney, Australia
- Died: 30 July 2010 (aged 92) Gisborne, New Zealand
- Party: National
- Occupation: civil service, Member of Parliament
- Profession: ballet, theatre

Esme Irene Tombleson CBE QSO (née Lawson; 1 August 1917 – 30 July 2010) was a New Zealand politician of the National Party. An Australian child prodigy who recited Shakespeare, she had a career in theatre and ballet. During the war, her sharp mind and strong memory was recognised, and she became a civil servant. She came to New Zealand through marriage, and lived on rural land near Gisborne. She represented the Gisborne electorate in Parliament for 12 years, and was prominent as a campaigner for multiple sclerosis.

== Early life ==
She was born in Sydney in 1917 and educated there. She received her education at the Sydney Church of England Girls Grammar School in Darlinghurst, the Sydney Conservatorium of Music, and the Imperial School of Ballet in London. She was taken around Australia as a child prodigy by her mother, reciting Shakespeare. She was involved in various ballet, opera and theatre companies. During World War II she served in the Women's Auxiliary Signalling Corps in Sydney, where her sharp memory was recognised. She became secretary of the Manpower Advisory Committee.

== Rural life ==
She came to New Zealand in 1951 when she married Tom Tombleson, a Gisborne farmer. They had met at Franz Josef while on holiday. She was a headstrong person and as a public servant, she had been in a position of power. As she knew nothing about farming, this was an area where her husband was a clear superior to her, and she found the experience interesting. They lived on Burnage Station, some 75 kilometres (47 mi) from Gisborne.

She had to teach herself how to cook, created a massive flower garden without ever having been a gardener before, and taught rural children ballet. This was not fulfilling her, so she started to take an interest in politics.

== Political career ==
New Zealand Parliament
Years	Term	Electorate	Party
1960–1963	33rd	Gisborne	National
1963–1966	34th	Gisborne	National
1966–1969	35th	Gisborne	National
1969–1972	36th	Gisborne	National

Tombleson was selected as a National Party candidate shortly before the 1960 election in the Gisborne electorate, when the previous candidate suffered a heart attack. She defeated the incumbent, Labour's Reginald Keeling, in the marginal seat. At the time, she was the only woman on the National caucus. After Mary Grigg and Hilda Ross, she was the third female National MP. She was joined by another female in the National caucus at the next general election in 1963, Rona Stevenson. Tombleson had a passion for fishing and when she was offered the role of Associate Minister of Social Welfare, she turned down the offer, as she wanted to be Minister of Fisheries.

She led the 1965 delegation to the 54th conference of the Inter-Parliamentary Union in Ottawa, Ontario, Canada; she was the first woman to lead a New Zealand delegation to the IPU.

She was defeated by Trevor Davey in the 1972 election.

== Later life ==
Tombleson was a co-founder of the National Multiple Sclerosis (MS) Society in 1961. She was president of the organisation (1975–1982) and founded the Gisborne–East Coast branch in 1988. For many years, she was on the executive of the International Federation of the Multiple Sclerosis Society. She was able to control meetings, as she had learned during her theatre training how to project her voice. When her hearing got worse later in life, her voice grew even louder.

Tombleson was appointed a Companion of the Queen's Service Order for public services in the 1977 Queen's Silver Jubilee and Birthday Honours. She was awarded the New Zealand 1990 Commemoration Medal in 1990, and made a Commander of the Order of the British Empire in the 1993 New Year Honours, for services to multiple sclerosis and the community. Also in 1993, she was awarded the New Zealand Suffrage Centennial Medal. She received the "rarely awarded" gold medal for distinguished services to multiple sclerosis in 1987. She died on 30 July 2010 in Gisborne.

The MS Society of New Zealand offers Esme Tombleson Awards at its annual general meetings.

== Notes ==
New Zealand Parliament
Preceded by Reginald Keeling	Member of Parliament for Gisborne; 1960–1972	Succeeded by Trevor Davey
