= Haddon Donald =

New Zealand businessman and politician

Haddon Donald DSO, MC, ED
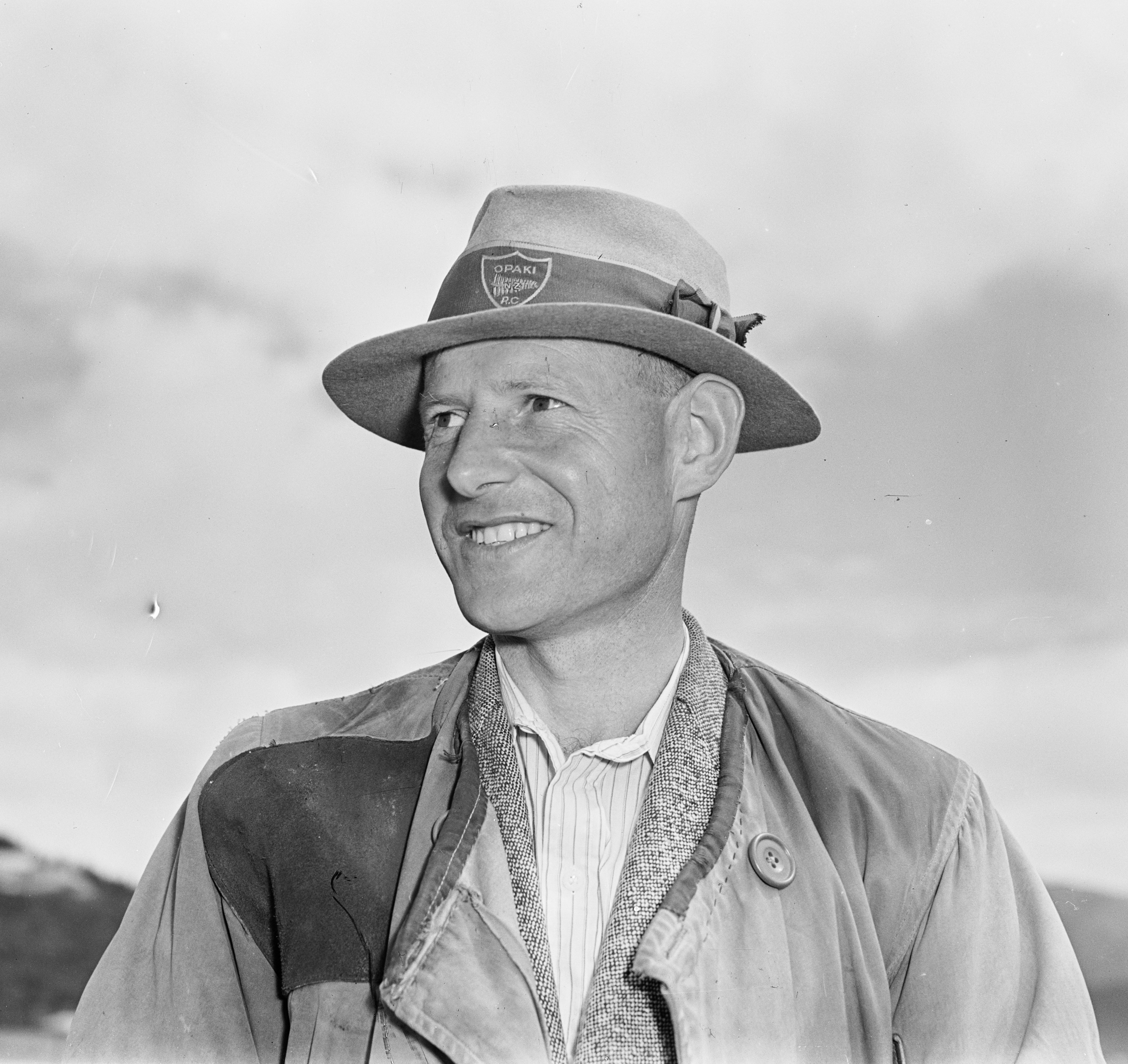

Member of the New Zealand Parliament for Wairarapa
- In office 1963–1969
- Preceded by: Bert Cooksley
- Succeeded by: Jack Williams

Personal details
- Born: Haddon Vivian Donald; 20 March 1917 Masterton, New Zealand
- Died: 23 April 2018 (aged 101) Masterton, New Zealand
- Party: National
- Spouse: Ana Alice Beetham (m. 1947; died 2014)
- Relations: Charlie Mills (great-grandfather)
- Children: 4

Military service
- Allegiance: New Zealand
- Branch/service: New Zealand Army
- Rank: Lieutenant colonel
- Commands: 22nd Battalion
- Battles/wars: Second World War; North African campaign; Battle of Crete; Italian campaign
- Awards: Distinguished Service Order; Military Cross; Mentioned in Despatches; Efficiency Decoration; Officer of the Legion of Merit (United States)

Haddon Vivian Donald, DSO, MC, ED (20 March 1917 – 23 April 2018) was a New Zealand soldier, businessman and politician of the National Party. He was the oldest living former New Zealand Member of Parliament, and at the time of his death, was the highest-ranking New Zealand army officer of World War II living. During the war, Donald served as an officer for the 22nd Battalion rising to the rank of lieutenant colonel. After his military service, Donald represented Wairarapa in the parliament from 1963 to 1969.

== Early life ==
Donald was born in 1917 at Masterton, the son of Vivian Everard Donald and Gertrude Blanche Donald (née Mills). He was educated at Nelson College from 1930 to 1932, and afterwards at Wairarapa College.

== Military life ==
He joined the New Zealand Expeditionary Force in 1939. During the Second World War he was an officer in the 22nd Battalion, rising to the rank of lieutenant colonel. The history group of the Ministry for Culture and Heritage has an interview with Haddon on its website where he describes the events at the Maleme airfield as part of the Battle of Crete. Donald was awarded the Military Cross in 1942, and the Distinguished Service Order in 1945. In 1947 he was made an Officer of the Legion of Merit by the United States. He was twice mentioned in dispatches, in 1941 and 1942. Donald later wrote about his experiences soldiering in Greece, Crete and Egypt in the book In Peace and War: A Civilian Soldier's Story, published in 2005.

== Political career ==
On his return from the war, he was a manufacturer based in the Wairarapa. He represented the Wairarapa electorate from 1963 in succession to Bert Cooksley, who retired after five terms. Donald held the electorate until 1969, when he was defeated by Labour's Jack Williams. He lost the election by 467 votes.

Donald worked for his family firm of Donald Presses Ltd for 50 years, and was chairman of the company from 1970 to 1986. He captained the New Zealand rifle team on five occasions. Donald lived in Taupō. In April 2013, Donald at 96 years old, visited the parliament for discussions with Defence Minister Jonathan Coleman and Speaker David Carter.

New Zealand Parliament
Years	Term	Electorate	Party
1963–1966	34th	Wairarapa	National
1966–1969	35th	Wairarapa	National

== Personal life ==
Donald was married to Ana Beetham from 1947 until she died in May 2014, aged 90; she was buried in Masterton. The couple had four children and 14 grandchildren. Donald turned 100 in March 2017 and died on 23 April 2018 in Masterton, at the age of 101.

== Honours and awards ==
Donald was awarded the Distinguished Service Order, Military Cross, Efficiency Decoration, and made an Officer of the Legion of Merit. In 1990, he was awarded the New Zealand 1990 Commemoration Medal. In May 2017, Donald received a telegram from Queen Elizabeth II commemorating his 100th birthday.

== Bibliography ==
- Donald, Haddon (2005). In Peace and War: A Civilian Soldier's Story. Masterton: Fraser Books. ISBN 0958252165 – via New Zealand Electronic Text Centre.

New Zealand Parliament
Preceded by Bert Cooksley	Member of Parliament for Wairarapa; 1963–1969	Succeeded by Jack Williams
