= Hobson (New Zealand electorate) =

Hobson is a former New Zealand parliamentary electorate. It existed from 1946 to 1978 and then from 1987 to 1996, and was represented by five Members of Parliament, four of whom represented the National Party. It is notable for returning a member of the Social Credit Party in the 1966 election, as no other candidate not aligned with either Labour or National had been elected to Parliament since 1943. With the re-drawing of boundaries in the first MMP election in 1996, the seat was absorbed into the Northland and Whangarei electorates.

== Population centres ==
The 1941 New Zealand census had been postponed due to World War II, so the 1946 electoral redistribution had to take ten years of population growth and movements into account. The North Island gained a further two electorates from the South Island due to faster population growth. The abolition of the country quota through the Electoral Amendment Act, 1945 reduced the number and increased the size of rural electorates. None of the existing electorates remained unchanged, 27 electorates were abolished, eight former electorates were re-established, and 19 electorates were created for the first time, including Hobson. The electorate was in the Northland Region, and in its original form included the following population centres: Ruawai, Dargaville, Kawakawa, Kaikohe, Kerikeri, Kaitaia, and Mangonui. The original area had previously been covered by the Bay of Islands and Kaipara electorates.

The electorate was abolished through the 1977 electoral redistribution. The area that it last covered was divided by the Bay of Islands and Kaipara electorates.

The 1987 electoral redistribution took the continued population growth in the North Island into account, and two additional general electorates were created, bringing the total number of electorates to 97. In the South Island, the shift of population to Christchurch had continued. Overall, three electorates were newly created, three electorates were recreated (including Hobson), and four electorates were abolished. All of those electorates were in the North Island. Changes in the South Island were restricted to boundary changes. These changes came into effect with the 1987 election.

== History ==
The first representative of the Hobson electorate was Sid Smith, who had previously represented the Bay of Islands electorate. Smith retired in 1960 and was succeeded by Logan Sloane in the 1960 election. In the 1960 and 1963 elections, Vernon Cracknell of the Social Credit Party contested the Hobson electorate and placed second on both occasions, pushing the Labour Party candidate into third place. The area had previously been receptive to social credit theory; the Social Credit Party had placed second in the 1954 election. In the 1966 election, Cracknell narrowly defeated Sloane.

=== Members of Parliament ===
Key

National Social Credit

Election	Winner
1946 election	Sid Smith
1949 election	Sid Smith
1951 election	Sid Smith
1954 election	Sid Smith
1957 election	Sid Smith
1960 election	Logan Sloane
1963 election	Logan Sloane
1966 election	Vernon Cracknell
1969 election	Logan Sloane (2nd period)
1972 election	Logan Sloane (2nd period)
1975 election	Neill Austin
(Electorate abolished in 1978; see Bay of Islands and Kaipara)
1987 election	Ross Meurant
1990 election	Ross Meurant
1993 election	Ross Meurant

== Election results ==
=== 1975 election ===
1975 general election: Hobson
Party	Candidate	Votes	%	±%
National	Neill Austin	9,559	51.68	
Social Credit	Howard Manning	5,458	29.51	+0.55
Labour	David Lange	2,703	14.61	
Values	Richard Alspach	774	4.18	
Majority		4,101	22.17	+14.93
Turnout		18,494	84.19	+4.22
Registered electors		21,965		

=== 1972 election ===
1972 general election: Hobson
Party	Candidate	Votes	%	±%
National	Logan Sloane	7,674	48.45	+0.94
Social Credit	Howard Manning	4,587	28.96	
Labour	R J Hendry	3,350	21.15	
New Democratic	C L Horsfall	126	0.79	
Independent	R D Greig	99	0.62	
Majority		1,148	7.24	−0.69
Turnout		15,836	88.41	−0.44
Registered electors		17,910		

=== 1969 election ===
1969 general election: Hobson
Party	Candidate	Votes	%	±%
National	Logan Sloane	7,493	47.51	+2.93
Social Credit	Vernon Cracknell	6,241	39.57	−8.48
Labour	Donald Frederick Mitchell	1,990	12.61	
Republican	M A James	47	0.29	
Majority		1,252	7.93	
Turnout		15,771	88.85	−0.95
Registered electors		17,749		

=== 1966 election ===
1966 general election: Hobson
Party	Candidate	Votes	%	±%
Social Credit	Vernon Cracknell	6,791	48.05	+3.70
National	Logan Sloane	6,301	44.58	±0.00
Labour	Miljenko Shroj	1,040	7.35	−3.71
Majority		490	3.46	
Turnout		14,132	89.80	−0.99
Registered electors		15,737		

=== 1963 election ===
1963 general election: Hobson
Party	Candidate	Votes	%	±%
National	Logan Sloane	6,207	44.58	−2.02
Social Credit	Vernon Cracknell	6,176	44.35	+7.94
Labour	Miljenko Shroj	1,540	11.06	
Majority		31	0.22	−9.97
Turnout		13,923	90.79	+1.85
Registered electors		15,334		

=== 1960 election ===
1960 general election: Hobson
Party	Candidate	Votes	%	±%
National	Logan Sloane	6,406	46.60	
Social Credit	Vernon Cracknell	5,005	36.41	
Labour	George Webber	2,335	16.98	
Majority		1,401	10.19	
Turnout		13,746	88.94	−1.49
Registered electors		15,455		

=== 1957 election ===
1957 general election: Hobson
Party	Candidate	Votes	%	±%
National	Sid Smith	6,887	49.93	+1.01
Labour	Colin Moyle	3,753	27.21	
Social Credit	Cecil William Elvidge	3,152	22.85	−5.94
Majority		3,134	22.72	+2.60
Turnout		13,792	90.43	+2.40
Registered electors		15,251		

=== 1954 election ===
1954 general election: Hobson
Party	Candidate	Votes	%	±%
National	Sid Smith	6,281	48.92	−20.98
Social Credit	Cecil William Elvidge	3,697	28.79	
Labour	May Kathleen Henderson	2,859	22.27	
Majority		2,584	20.12	−20.99
Turnout		12,837	88.03	+4.52
Registered electors		14,581		

=== 1951 election ===
1951 general election: Hobson
Party	Candidate	Votes	%	±%
National	Sid Smith	9,035	69.60	
Labour	Norman King	3,698	28.48	
Ind. Country Party	Henry Durban Slyfield	248	1.91	
Majority		5,337	41.11	
Turnout		12,981	83.51	
Registered electors		15,543		
