= 1960 New Zealand general election =

- 26 November 1960

All 80 seats in the New Zealand Parliament 41 seats were needed for a majority
- Turnout: 1,170,503 (89.8%) ▼
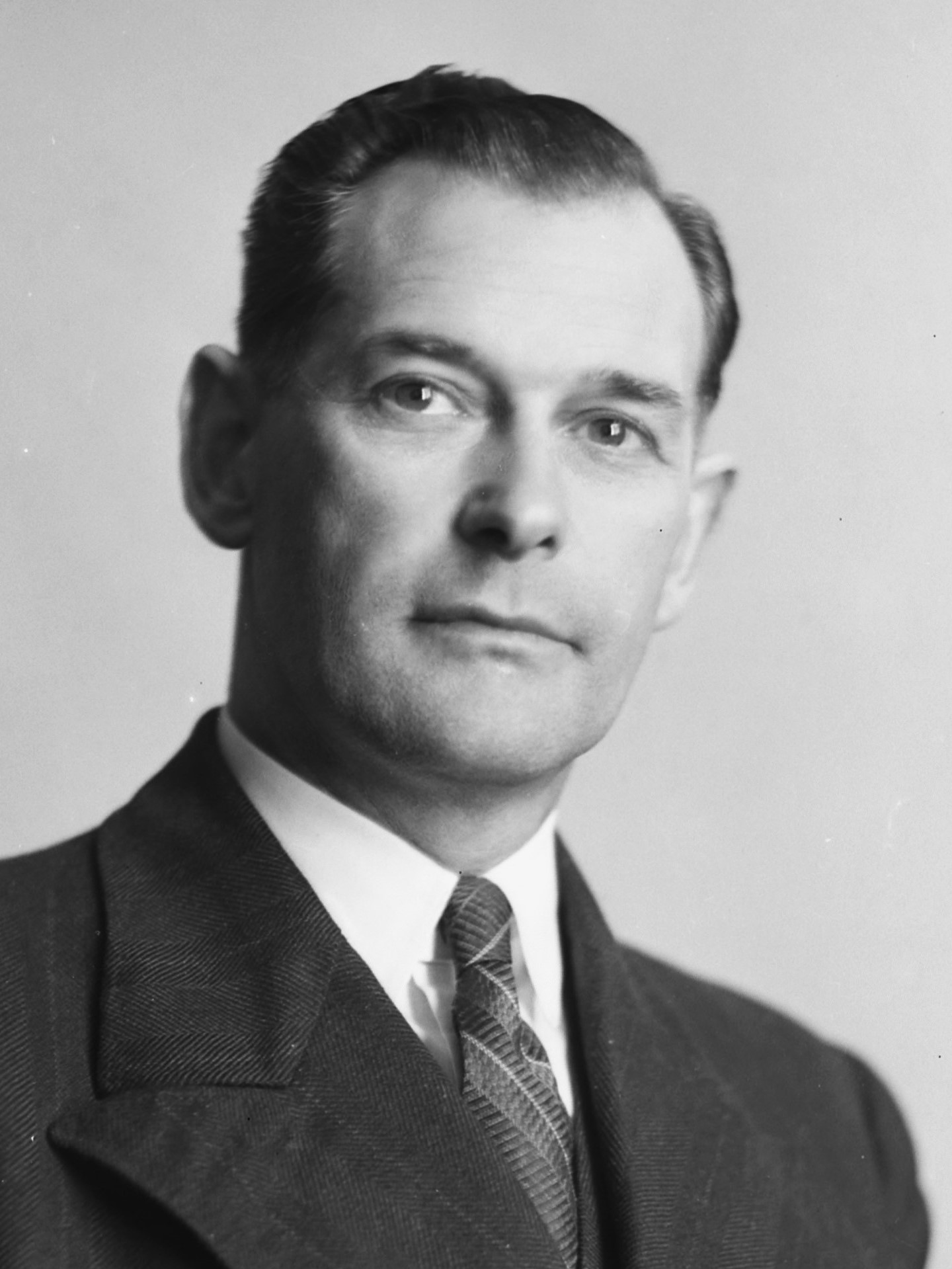

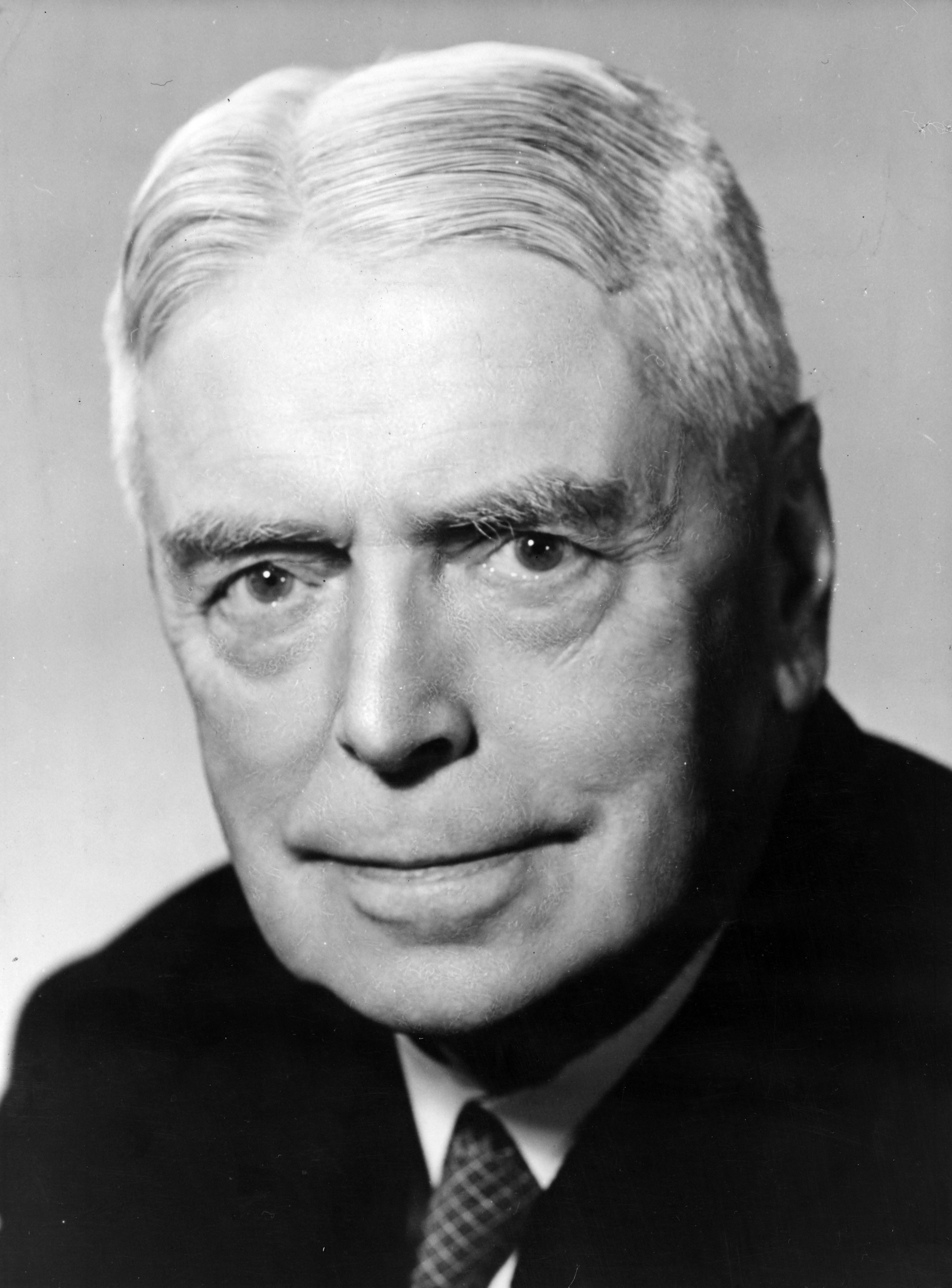
	First party	Second party
Leader	Keith Holyoake	Walter Nash
Party	National	Labour
Leader since	13 August 1957	17 January 1951
Leader's seat	Pahiatua	Hutt
Last election	39 seats, 44.2%	41 seats, 48.3%
Seats won	46	34
Seat change	▲7	▼7
Popular vote	557,046	508,179
Percentage	47.6%	43.4%
Swing	▲3.4%	▼4.9%
- Results by electorate, shaded by winning margin
Prime Minister before election
Walter Nash
Labour
Subsequent Prime Minister
Keith Holyoake
National

The 1960 New Zealand general election was a nationwide vote to determine the shape of the New Zealand Parliament's 33rd term. It saw the governing Labour Party defeated by the National Party, putting an end to the short second Labour government.

== Background ==
The Labour Party had won the 1957 election by a narrow margin, beginning New Zealand's second period of Labour government. However, the new administration soon lost its narrow lead in public opinion, with its financial policies being the principal cause of dissatisfaction. The so-called "Black Budget", introduced by finance minister Arnold Nordmeyer, increased taxes substantially, with particularly large increases for alcohol and tobacco taxes; Labour became widely seen as both miserly and puritanical. The government defended its tax increases as a necessary measure to avert a balance of payments crisis, but the opposition, led by Keith Holyoake, made substantial gains out of the issue throughout the parliamentary term.

Both parties crafted narratives on the history of the balance of payments crisis in the lead up to the election. Holyoake tried to argue that overseas funds had not fallen as much as Nash said in 1957, and that Labour had produced a panic budget. Moreover, the over-importing was due to a fear of import controls if Labour should win. Nash continued to stress that National had produced the worst economic crisis since the Great Depression and that Labour had averted further disaster by its action. Coincidentally, at the beginning of the election another drop in overseas funds occurred, but neither party commented much about it.

Labour's main policy platform was on industrialization particularly with new cotton mills in Nelson. Nash constantly repeated the theme people in New Zealand had 'never been so well off' and pamphlets stated 'everyone, everywhere, will again be better off', closely mirroring British Prime Minister Harold Macmillan's winning slogan in 1959, 'You've never had it so good'. National's campaign promised to lower taxes, reduce import controls and abolish compulsory unionism.

A very thorough study of the election by three political scientists concluded that National's preparations for the election, organization, and publicity were much better than Labour's which was the main reason for the result with little substantial differences between the parties in policy. National's party organisation recognised their win was mostly due to public mood against Labour and many traditional Labour voters not bothering to vote. As a result Labour's vote share had fallen more than National's had risen.

=== MPs retiring in 1960 ===
Five National MPs and four Labour MPs intended to retire at the end of the 32nd Parliament.

Party	Name	Electorate
National	James Roy	Clutha
National	Duncan Rae	Eden
National	Jack Watts	Fendalton
National	Sidney Walter Smith	Hobson
National	Jimmy Maher	Otaki
Labour	Bill Anderton	Auckland Central
Labour	Phil Holloway	Heretaunga
Labour	Joe Cotterill	Wanganui
Labour	Jim Kent	Westland

== The election ==
The date for the main 1960 election was 26 November. 1,310,742 people were registered to vote, and turnout was 89.8%. This turnout was slightly lower than what had been recorded in the previous elections. The number of seats being contested was 80, a number which had been fixed since 1902.

== Opinion polling ==
Polling ahead of the 1960 New Zealand general election was limited, but three polls conducted by Gallup provided insight into voter preferences leading up to the election. These polls give a snapshot of party support in the months before the vote. The results are outlined in the table below:

Poll	Date	National	Labour	Socred	Others	Lead
1960 election result	26 Nov 1960	47.2	43.4	8.6	0.4	3.8
Gallup	22 Nov 1960	46	43	9		3
Gallup	18 Oct 1960	49	43	6		6
Gallup	13 Sep 1960	47	44	6		3

== Results ==
The 1960 election saw the governing Labour Party defeated by a twelve-seat margin, having previously held a two-seat majority. National won a total of 46 seats to Labour's 34 seats, and formed the second National government. In the popular vote, National won 47.59% to Labour's 43.42%.

The Social Credit Party won 8.62% of the vote, but no seats. Three of their candidates missed the nomination deadline, and the opening address of the party leader P. H. Matthews was not noteworthy.

Three new National members of parliament were called the Young Turks: Peter Gordon, Duncan MacIntyre and Robert Muldoon. The other new National MPs were Esme Tombleson, Bill Brown, Harry Lapwood, Logan Sloane, Bert Walker, and Dan Riddiford.

Paddy Blanchfield, Ron Bailey, Norman Douglas and George Spooner entered parliament for Labour.

Election results
Party	Candidates	Total votes	Percentage	Seats won	Change
National	80	557,046	47.6	46	+7
Labour	80	508,179	43.4	34	−7
Social Credit	79	100,905	8.6	0	±0
Communist	18	2,423	0.21	0	±0
Others	7	1,950	0.2	0	±0
Total	269	1,170,503		80	

=== Votes summary ===
Popular Vote
National	47.60%
Labour	43.40%
Social Credit	8.60%
Others	0.40%

Parliament seats
National	57.50%
Labour	42.50%

The table below shows the results of the 1960 general election:

Key

National Labour Social Credit

Electorate results for the 1960 New Zealand general election
Electorate	Incumbent	Winner	Majority	Runner up
General electorates
Ashburton	Geoff Gerard		2,558	George Glassey
Auckland Central	Bill Anderton	Norman Douglas	1,846	Ray Presland
Avon	John Mathison		4,216	Lorrie Pickering
Awarua	Gordon Grieve		3,000	J P Wyatt
Bay of Plenty	Percy Allen		2,411	Godfrey Santon
Buller	Jerry Skinner		1,546	Ernie King
Christchurch Central	Robert Macfarlane		1,935	Tom Flint
Clutha	James Roy	Peter Gordon	3,863	Joseph Fahey
Dunedin Central	Phil Connolly		842	Norman Scurr
Dunedin North	Ethel McMillan		2,475	Brenda Bell
Eden	Duncan Rae	John Rae	1,902	Russell Penney
Egmont	William Sheat		3,933	J W Watson
Fendalton	Jack Watts	Harry Lake	2,722	Bill Rowling
Franklin	Alfred E. Allen		5,197	Howard Preston
Gisborne	Reginald Keeling	Esme Tombleson	291	Reginald Keeling
Grey Lynn	Fred Hackett		4,596	Brian Zouch
Hamilton	Lance Adams-Schneider		2,583	Sir Basil Arthur
Hastings	Ted Keating	Duncan MacIntyre	300	Ted Keating
Hauraki	Arthur Kinsella		2,635	Albert Clifford Tucker
Hawkes Bay	Cyril Harker		3,682	John Woolf
Heretaunga	Phil Holloway	Ron Bailey	2,576	Vere Hampson-Tindale
Hobson	Sidney Walter Smith	Logan Sloane	1,401	Vernon Cracknell
Hurunui	William Gillespie		2,731	Arthur Adcock
Hutt	Walter Nash		2,349	George Barker
Invercargill	Ralph Hanan		1,926	Oliver James Henderson
Island Bay	Arnold Nordmeyer		1,791	Fairlie Curry
Karori	Jack Marshall		4,313	Olive Smuts-Kennedy
Lyttelton	Norman Kirk		260	Jim Hay
Manawatu	Blair Tennent		3,120	Leonard Thomas Fischer
Manukau	Leon Götz		245	Cyril Stamp
Marlborough	Tom Shand		1,747	Robert William Hope
Marsden	Don McKay		4,351	John Swanson Reid
Miramar	Bill Fox		467	Bernard Lyons
Mornington	Wally Hudson		2,246	George Robert Thorn
Mount Albert	Warren Freer		1,676	Clarice Anderson
Napier	Jim Edwards		1,405	William John Gunn
Nelson	Stan Whitehead		1,767	Colin Wilson Martin
New Plymouth	Ernest Aderman		1,693	Ron Barclay
North Shore	Dean Eyre		1,817	Peter Lawrence Smith
Onehunga	Hugh Watt		4,705	Paul Brian Phillips
Onslow	Henry May		790	Maida Clark
Otago Central	Jack George		4,344	Brian MacDonell
Otahuhu	James Deas		2,774	Thomas Tucker
Otaki	Jimmy Maher	Allan McCready	2,044	Thomas William Cameron
Pahiatua	Keith Holyoake		4,934	Kingsley McKane
Palmerston North	Philip Skoglund	Bill Brown	133	Philip Skoglund (Note: Skoglund was first on election night, but lost after special votes were counted)
Patea	Roy Jack		2,304	David Costello Valley
Petone	Mick Moohan		2,918	Dick Martin
Piako	Stan Goosman		5,376	Henry Uttinger
Ponsonby	Ritchie Macdonald		4,744	Neil McLaughlan
Raglan	Douglas Carter		1,371	Alan Baxter
Rangitikei	Norman Shelton		3,889	Shaun Cameron
Remuera	Ronald Algie		6,109	Barry Gustafson
Riccarton	Mick Connelly		2,022	Deena V. Sergel
Rodney	Jack Scott		4,157	Phil Amos
Roskill	Arthur Faulkner		1,374	Geoffrey Taylor
Rotorua	Ray Boord	Harry Lapwood	358	Ray Boord
Selwyn	John McAlpine		2,839	John Palmer
St Albans	Neville Pickering	Bert Walker	298	Neville Pickering
St Kilda	Bill Fraser		835	Jim Barnes
Stratford	Thomas Murray		4,388	H M St George
Sydenham	Mabel Howard		4,793	Derek Quigley
Tamaki	Bob Tizard	Robert Muldoon	1,148	Bob Tizard
Tauranga	George Walsh		5,239	D C Goodfellow
Timaru	Clyde Carr		357	Ronald Erle White
Waikato	Geoffrey Sim		3,041	Arthur John Ingram
Waipa	Hallyburton Johnstone		3,241	Bob Reese
Wairarapa	Bert Cooksley		2,088	Allan Goldsmith
Waitakere	Rex Mason		3,709	John Herbert Wilkinson
Waitaki	Thomas Hayman		1,972	Les McKay
Waitemata	Norman King		1,249	Jolyon Firth
Waitomo	David Seath		3,951	Duncan Barclay McLaren
Wallace	Brian Talboys		5,736	E Harris
Wanganui	Joe Cotterill	George Spooner	160	Eugene Crotty
Wellington Central	Frank Kitts	Dan Riddiford	381	Frank Kitts
Westland	Jim Kent	Paddy Blanchfield	3,844	D A Hogg
Māori electorates
Eastern Maori	Tiaki Omana		3,025	Arnold Reedy
Northern Maori	Tapihana Paikea		3,372	George Russell Harrison
Southern Maori	Eruera Tirikatene		3,947	Rangi Tutaki
Western Maori	Iriaka Rātana		4,666	Pei Te Hurinui Jones

Table footnotes:

=== Bibliography ===
- The New Zealand Gazette "Members of the House of Representatives Elected – General Election" (20 December 1960) issue 84 page 2002.
