= Sid Smith (politician) =

New Zealand politician (1893–1981)

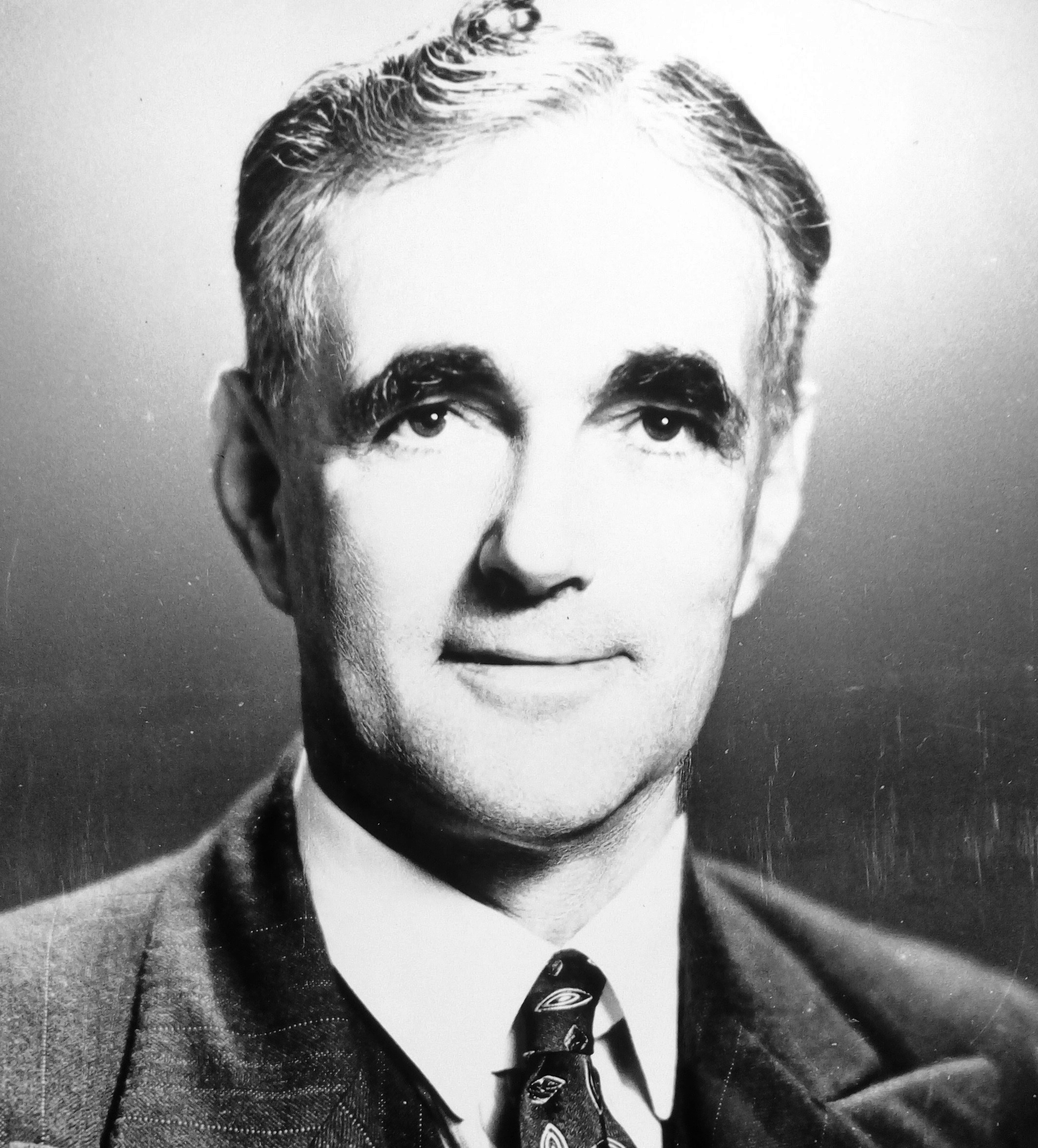
Smith, c. 1950

Sidney Walter Smith JP (20 January 1893 – 26 August 1981) was a New Zealand politician of the National Party. He was a parliamentary under-secretary and later a cabinet minister.

== Biography ==
New Zealand Parliament
Years	Term	Electorate	Party
1943–1946	27th	Bay of Islands	National
1946–1949	28th	Hobson	National
1949–1951	29th	Hobson	National
1951–1954	30th	Hobson	National
1954–1957	31st	Hobson	National
1957–1960	32nd	Hobson	National

Smith was born in Ashburton in 1893. He received his education at Algin Primary and Ashburton High Schools. He served in the NZEF in France and Egypt in World War I. He then farmed at Opuawhanga and Pakaraka and went into business. He was on several local boards, acting as a member of the Bay of Islands County Council and the Bay of Islands Hospital Board, and as Chairman of the Bay of Islands Dairy Company.

Smith married Dorothy Alice Blundell in 1924.

Smith represented the Bay of Islands electorate from 1943 to 1946, and the renamed Hobson electorate from 1946 to 1960 when he retired. Under Sidney Holland, he was Parliamentary Under-Secretary for the Minister of Agriculture and of Marketing (1949–1954). In the second Holland Ministry, he was Minister of Internal Affairs and Minister of Forests (1954–1957). Under Keith Holyoake in 1957, he continued with the Internal Affairs and Forestry portfolios, and was also appointed Minister of Agriculture. In 1953, Smith was awarded the Queen Elizabeth II Coronation Medal.

After his retirement from Parliament in 1960, Smith was deputy chairman of the Auckland Division of the National Party from 1963 to 1965. He also served on the board of the ASB Bank and was President when he retired in 1975.

Smith died in Auckland in 1981 aged 88, 23 days before the death of his wife.

== Notes ==
New Zealand Parliament
Preceded by Charles Boswell	Member of Parliament for Bay of Islands; 1943–1946	In abeyance Title next held by Neill Austin
