= Gordon Grieve =

New Zealand politician

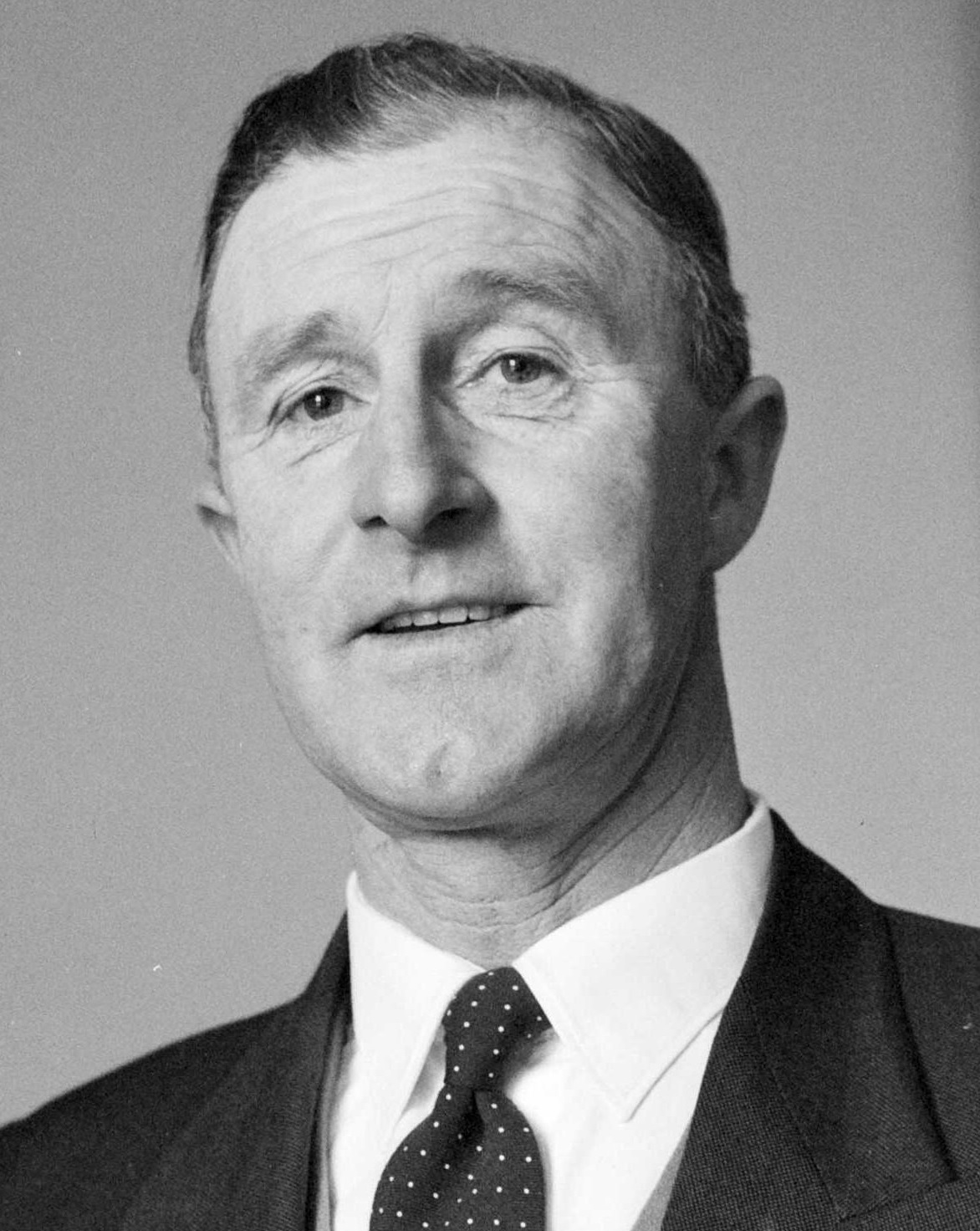
Grieve in 1959

Gordon Glendinning Grieve QSO (21 August 1912 – 17 October 1993) was a New Zealand politician of the National Party.

== Biography ==
New Zealand Parliament
| Years | Term | Electorate | Party |
|---|---|---|---|
| 1957–1960 | 32nd | Awarua | National |
| 1960–1963 | 33rd | Awarua | National |
| 1963–1966 | 34th | Awarua | National |
| 1966–1969 | 35th | Awarua | National |

Grieve was born in 1912 in Otahuti, Southland, a locality north-west of Invercargill. He attended Otahuti School and became a farmer. On 20 April 1938, he married Ena (Willena) Young, the daughter of William Young, at St Paul's Church in Invercargill. Her family was also from Otahuti and her father was to become a member of the Legislative Council in 1950. They were to have three daughters.

Grieve was a rugby referee for 15 years. He was president of the Central Southland Rugby Referees' Association from 1949 to 1955. He was active with the Southland A & P Association and at shows, he judged and inspected cattle and sheep. In 1946, he was the foundation president of the Southland Southdown Breeders Club. He was an advisory member for the Young Farmers' Club. He was a board member of the Presbyterian Social Services Association, the Historic Places Trust, and the Licensing Trust in Invercargill.

For 14 years, he was the secretary of the local branch of the National Party. He represented the Awarua electorate from 1957 to 1969, when he retired. A Presbyterian, in 1961 he was one of ten National MPs to vote with the Opposition and remove capital punishment for murder from the Crimes Bill that the Second National Government had introduced. In 1967, he was junior whip for the National Party (with Alfred E. Allen as senior whip).

In the 1980 Queen's Birthday Honours, Grieve was appointed a Companion of the Queen's Service Order for public services.

== Notes ==
New Zealand Parliament
| Preceded by George Herron | Member of Parliament for Awarua; 1957–1969 | Succeeded by Hugh Templeton |
