= Olive Smuts-Kennedy =

Activist and local politician

Olive Smuts-Kennedy QSO
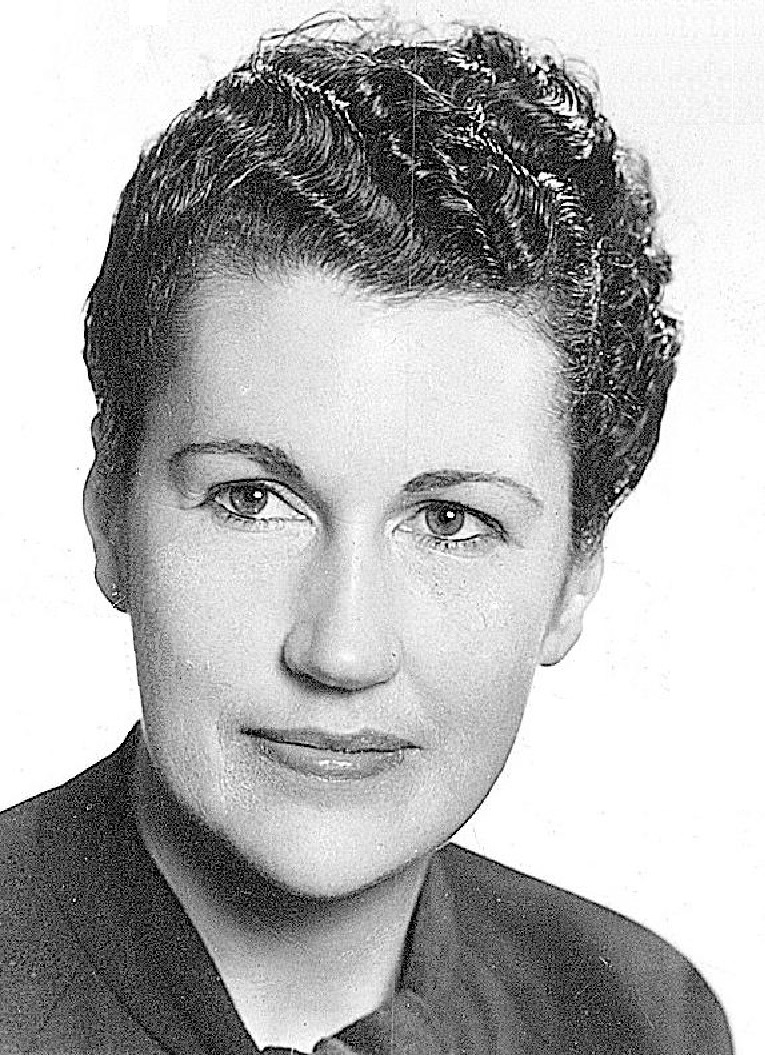

Member of the Wellington City Council
- In office 1965–1973
- Succeeded by: Seton Nossiter

Personal details
- Born: 23 March 1925
- Died: 19 December 2013 (aged 88)
- Party: Labour
- Spouse: Arthur Edward Smuts-Kennedy
- Children: 3
- Education: University of Auckland
- Profession: Lawyer

Olive Evelyn Smuts-Kennedy QSO (née Wright; 23 March 1925 – 19 December 2013) was an activist and local politician in Wellington, New Zealand.

== Biography ==
=== Early life ===
Olive Smuts-Kennedy was born on 23 March 1925. Her grandfather, Fortunatus Evelyn Wright was an early New Zealand settler, having arrived from England aboard the ship Samarang in 1852. In 1945 she married Arthur Edward Smuts-Kennedy and had one son and two daughters. She attended Auckland University and graduated with a Bachelor of Arts in 1951 and later a Bachelor of Law in 1955. She was admitted to the Bar that same year. She was involved with the women's rights organisation The Council for Equal Pay and Opportunity (affiliated with the National Council of Women) serving as its chairperson from 1960 to 1964. In 1965 she became a SEATO research fellow.

=== Political career ===
Smuts-Kennedy stood for election to the New Zealand House of Representatives for the Labour Party in four consecutive elections. She stood in Karori in 1960, Waimarino in 1963, Tauranga in 1966 and Wellington Central in 1969. She came in second place on every occasion. Additionally she was approached to stand for Labour in the 1967 Petone by-election, however she was not selected as a candidate. She also served as the President of the Wellington Labour Representation Committee.

In 1965 Smuts-Kennedy won a seat on the Wellington City Council on a Labour ticket which she was to hold until 1973 when she resigned. During her time as a councillor she was chairperson of the cultural, libraries and public relations committees. She was particularly opposed to the council passing an act to build a motorway through the Bolton Street Cemetery, arguing that the plan to bisect the cemetery for the Wellington Urban Motorway would destroy part of the city's heritage. She said "What a sacrilege it would be if [the city] were all to be made so municipally trim as to take away its soul … [W]e have no ancient buildings and few early relics of a lasting character — the more reason to preserve what we have".

=== Later life ===
In the 1990 Queen's Birthday Honours, Smuts-Kennedy was appointed a Companion of the Queen's Service Order for public services.

Smuts-Kennedy died on 19 December 2013.
