= Black Budget (New Zealand) =

1958 budget with unpopular taxes increases

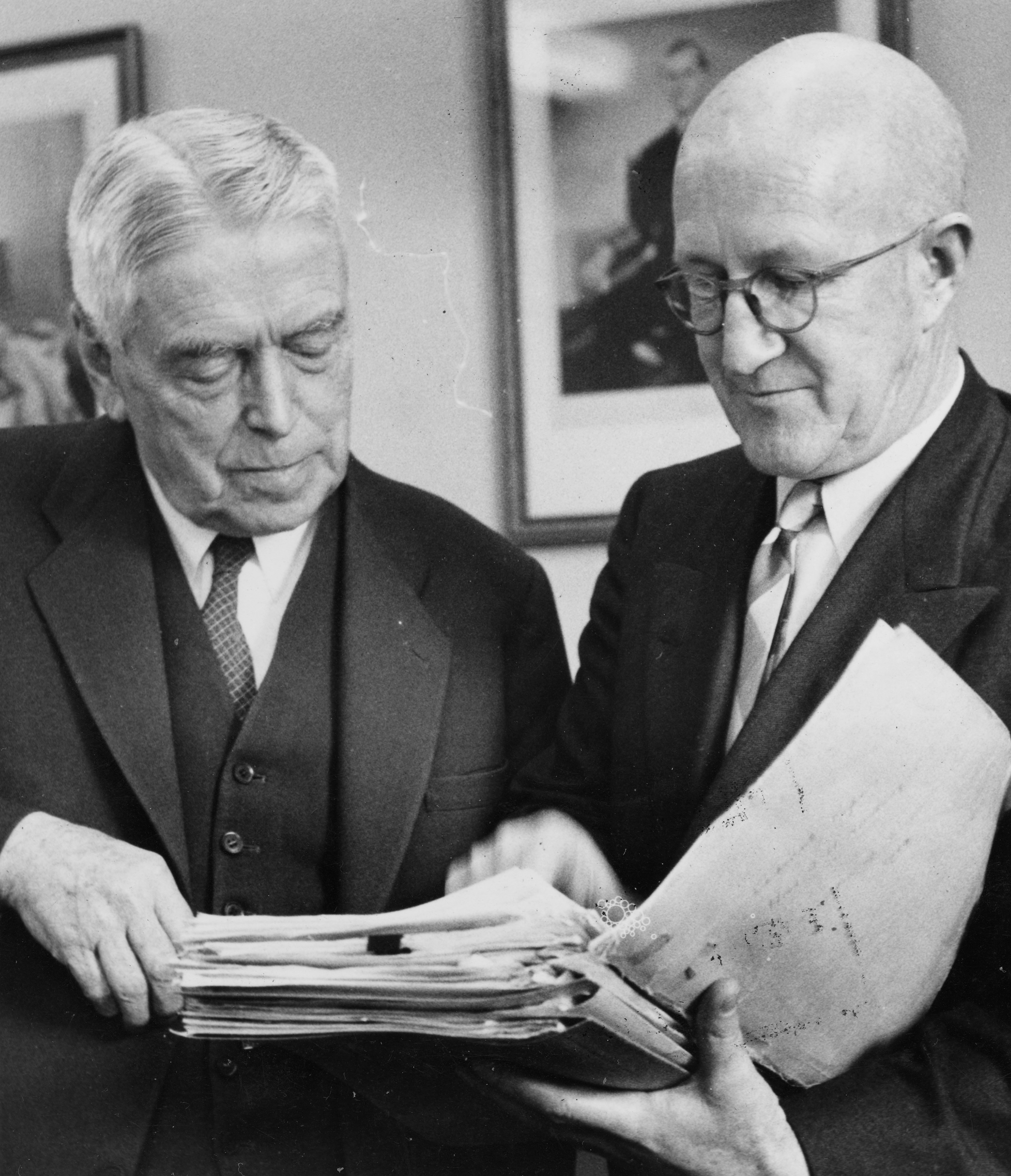
Nash and Nordmeyer

In New Zealand, the term Black Budget refers to the government budget of 26 June 1958, in which Minister of Finance Arnold Nordmeyer increased taxes on beer, tobacco, cars and petrol.

== Background ==
The second Labour government took office in 1957, the 32nd Parliament. Within a year, the government was confronted with a balance of payments crisis caused by the collapse of the price of butter in Britain (New Zealand's largest export market at the time). Nordmeyer's colleagues were reluctant to cut government spending or break expensive election promises, so Nordmeyer was left with little option but to raise taxes, which was recommended by both the Treasury and Prime Minister Walter Nash (himself a former minister of finance). The budget increased social security benefits but was very unpopular, not least with Labour's traditional working-class supporters.

The term 'black budget' is believed to have been coined by union leader Fintan Patrick Walsh, but was taken up by the National Party opposition, and became the commonly used term for the budget. Rises in income tax levels hurt single earners and childless families the most.

The budget was prepared by the cabinet finance committee of Walter Nash, Arnold Nordmeyer, Phil Holloway and Tom Skinner. Member of Parliament Warren Freer was told by Holloway that it was Nash rather than Nordmeyer who fought for the "draconian measures" finally adopted. While export prices had "had a real bashing" with butter at half its normal level and wool and meat also down, Holloway and Skinner felt that prices of both wool and meat were likely to rise and drastic measures were not fully justified. In caucus the measures were criticised by Michael Moohan, Frank Kitts and Bill Fox and, despite his cabinet position, Moohan continued to agitate against the beer price rise in private. Philip Connolly said of Nash, who had said that there was no alternative, that he was "telling a bloody big lie" as Nash was rubbing the gold cross on his watch chain when he said it. Freer saw some saving grace in the tightening of import controls and emphasis on local manufacture which boosted employment.

The government's popularity never recovered from the budget, which is generally believed to have cost it the 1960 election. Nordmeyer was forever tainted by the 'black budget', which gave him a reputation as a puritanical 'wowser' who was opposed to simple working class pleasures such as automobiles, beer and cigarettes. Despite this, he became the leader of the Labour Party in 1963, but was replaced by the more popular Norman Kirk only two years later.

== Popular culture ==
In 2010, DB Breweries ran an advertising campaign attributing the creation of one of its brands, DB Export Gold to the increased taxes on beer introduced by the 'black budget'. However, the brewery was forced to pull the campaign from television and internet in February 2011 (though newspaper ads were unaffected) after the New Zealand Advertising Standards Authority partially upheld a complaint laid by Progressive Party leader Jim Anderton that the campaign was "unethical, inaccurate and distorted history" as little beer was then imported to New Zealand and the budget raised the excise only to the same as local beers.
