= Logan Sloane =

Logan Francis Sloane (8 August 1918 – 24 September 1980) was a New Zealand politician of the National Party.

== Biography ==
New Zealand Parliament
| Years | Term | Electorate | Party |
|---|---|---|---|
| 1960–1963 | 33rd | Hobson | National |
| 1963–1966 | 34th | Hobson | National |
| 1969–1972 | 36th | Hobson | National |
| 1972–1975 | 37th | Hobson | National |

Sloane was born in Omana, near Dargaville in 1918. He was the son of J. H. Sloane. He received his education at Dargaville District High School. In 1945, he married Jean Nesbit Warne, the daughter of J. L. Warne. They had one son and one daughter. Sloane participated in various sports and represented various areas in rugby and cricket. He served with the New Zealand Engineers from 1940 to 1945.

Sloane was the director of the Northern Wairoa Dairy Company (1955–1960). He was active with the Royal New Zealand Returned and Services Association (RSA) and was president of a local district for three years. As vice-president of the Northland district, he served in the dominion executive.

He represented the seat of Hobson in Northland from 1960 to 1966, and from 1969 to 1975, when he retired. In 1961, he was one of ten national members of Parliament to vote with the Opposition and remove capital punishment for murder from the Crimes Bill that the Second National Government had introduced.

In the 1966 election, Vernon Cracknell, an accountant, who had come second in the previous two elections narrowly defeated Sloane, the incumbent (again, Labour was third). Cracknell was the first representative in Parliament of the Social Credit Party. However, as Cracknell did not prove a good performer in Parliament, and Social Credit ran a poor 1969 campaign, Sloane regained his seat with a substantial margin after three years and Social Credit lost its only MP.
