= 1957 New Zealand National Party leadership election =

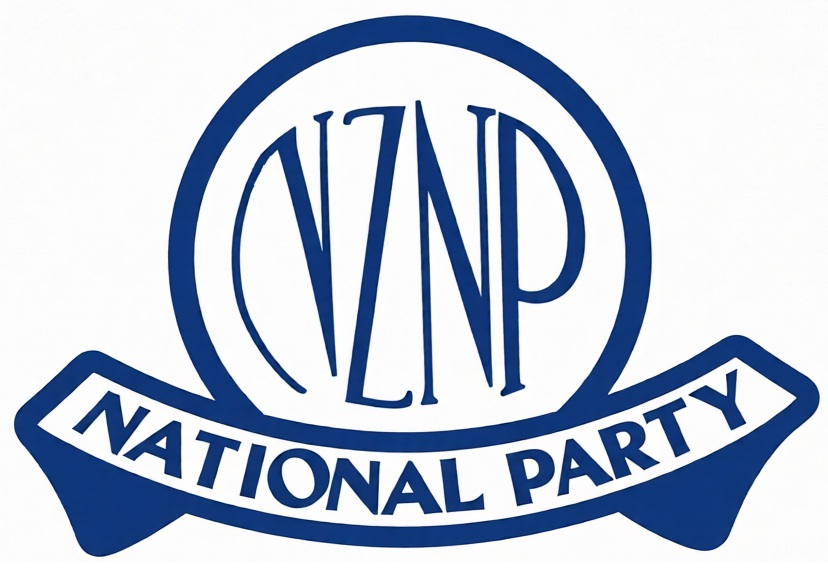
- 13 August 1957
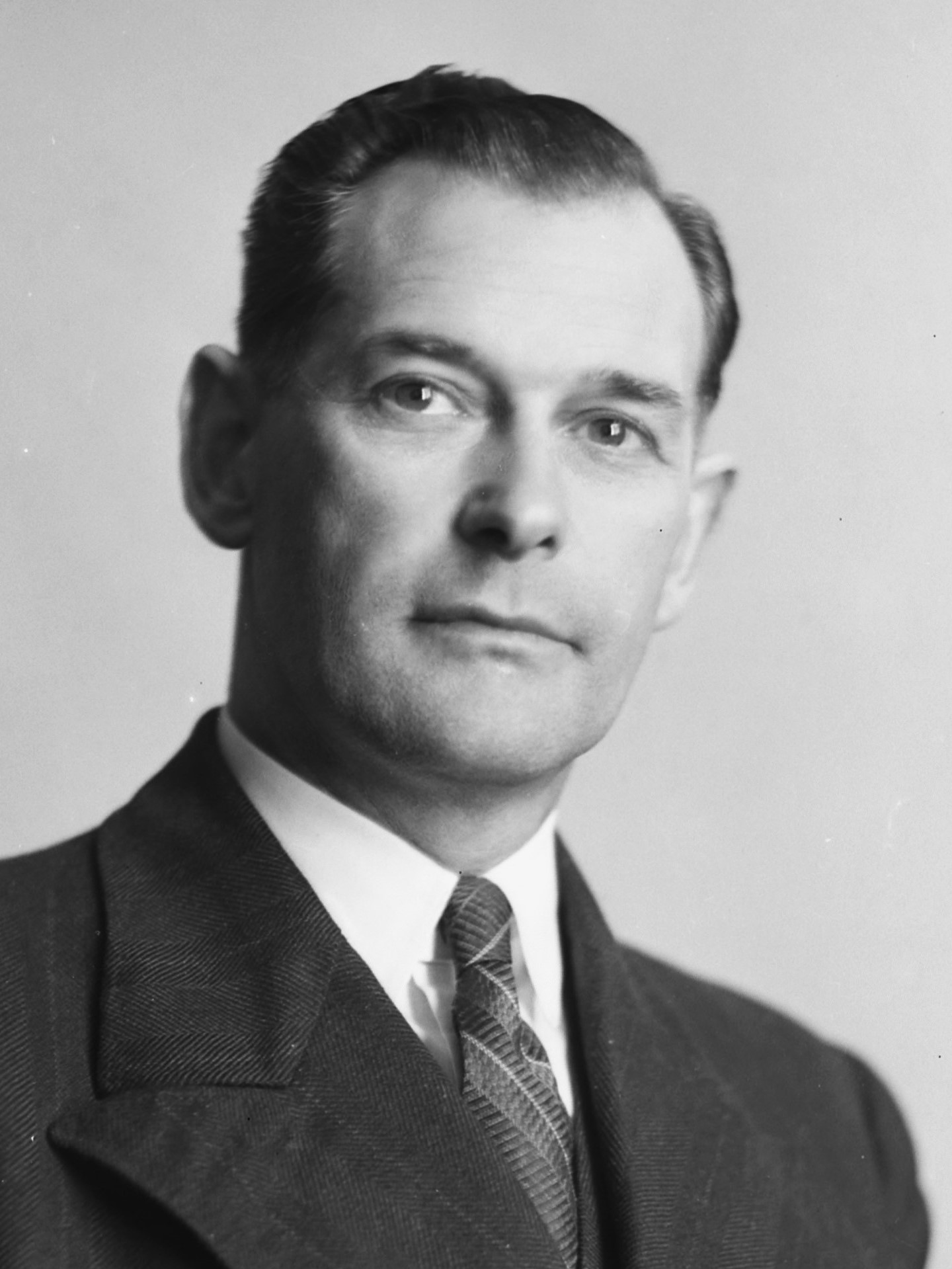
Candidate	Keith Holyoake
Popular vote	elected unopposed
Leader before election
Sidney Holland
Leader after election
Keith Holyoake

The 1957 New Zealand National Party leadership election was held to choose the next leader of the New Zealand National Party. The election was won by Pahiatua MP Keith Holyoake.

== Background ==
By 1956 Sidney Holland’s health was beginning to fail. His memory began to deteriorate and he lost much energy which he needed for work. In October 1956 he suffered either a mild heart attack or stroke while working in his office during the Suez Crisis. The following year a group of senior cabinet ministers led by Keith Holyoake, Jack Marshall, Jack Watts and party president, Alex McKenzie, persuaded Holland (who was reluctant to go) to resign citing his health deterioration. Holland announced his retirement from the leadership at the National's annual conference in Christchurch on 12 August 1957. Almost immediately after finishing his speech he collapsed backstage and was rushed to hospital by an ambulance.

== Candidates ==
=== Keith Holyoake ===
Holyoake was a senior member of Holland's government. He served as Deputy Prime Minister, Minister of Agriculture and Minister of Marketing. He had been seen for years as a potential leader and was often predicted to be the one to succeed Adam Hamilton as National's leader, however he was hampered in this after losing his seat in the 1938 election.

=== Others ===
The only other possible successor to Holland was his minister of labour, Bill Sullivan. He was seen as leadership material being straight-talking, tough, energetic and resolute and when Holland's health began to fail Sullivan was speculated as being a possible prime minister. However, Sullivan had resigned from Parliament in February 1957, following the death of his son Bruce, ruling out the possibility of a candidature.

== Result ==
Holland named Holyoake as his preferred successor as party leader in his resignation and stated that he would nominate Holyoake himself. In the following caucus meeting, held on the next day, Holyoake was unanimously elected as National's third party leader. Holyoake's elevation to the leadership left the deputy spot vacant. Attorney-General Jack Marshall defeated Minister of Finance Jack Watts for the position.

== Aftermath ==
Holyoake served as prime minister for two months before the general election that year, making only modest changes to cabinet. After Holland's resignation he was knighted and made a Minister without portfolio by Holyoake before retiring from Parliament at the 1957 election, which National went on to lose, claiming 39 seats to Labour's 41.
