= Anne de Bruin =

New Zealand economics researcher

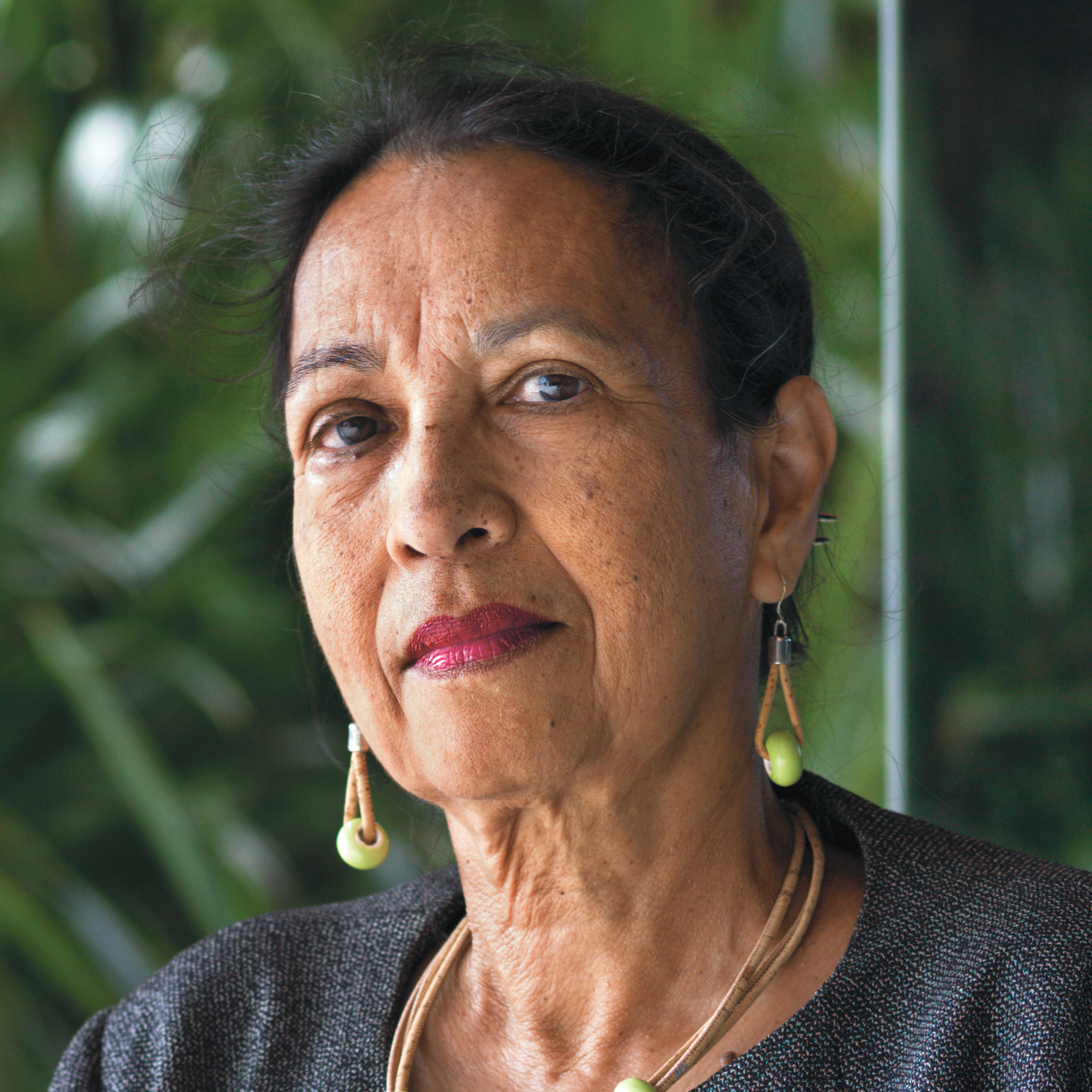
- Education: University of New England, Massey University
- Scientific career
- Thesis: Transformation of the welfare state in New Zealand with special reference to employment (1997)
- Doctoral advisor: Rolf Cremer, Ian Shirley
- Doctoral students: Virginia Warriner

Anne Marguerite de Bruin is a socio-economist and Professor of Economics in the School of Economics and Finance at the Albany campus of Massey University, New Zealand. Her research focuses on social enterprises and women's entrepreneurship and innovation.

== Academic career ==
After completing a Massey University PhD in 1997, titled Transformation of the welfare state in New Zealand with special reference to employment, de Bruin rose to full professor.

De Bruin has published in leading journals including Entrepreneurship Theory and Practice (ETP) and the International Small Business Journal (ISBJ). She sits on six journal editorial boards: International Small Business Journal, Journal of Management and Organization, Qualitative Research in Organizations and Management, Forum for Social Economics, Small Enterprise Research, and the International Journal of Gender and Entrepreneurship (having been on the editorial board since its founding in 2008). She has also recently been guest co-editor for Entrepreneurship Theory and Practice and the Journal of Interdisciplinary Economics.

De Bruin is the founding director of Massey University's New Zealand Social Innovation and Entrepreneurship Research Centre (SIERC) an interdisciplinary research centre on its Albany campus which opened on 19 July 2018. The idea for SIERC came about in the mid-1990s, when de Bruin was working in Ōtara, South Auckland, and was developed further during her 2009 Fulbright Program Senior Scholar fellowship, when she spent four months studying entrepreneurship at Babson College, Boston. SIERC has a staff of 12 academics, and its first case study was of innovation and entrepreneurial activity at Wellington Zoo.

Anne de Bruin is a leading member of the Diana International Network, and Diana Award, which studies women entrepreneurs, and provide monetary recognitory awards to young female entrepenuers.

One of de Bruin's notable students is Professor Virginia Warriner.

== Research ==
De Bruin's research is focussed on entrepreneurship and innovation, particularly by women, and how it can create employment in disadvantaged communities or regions. She also studies how social institutions and enterprises can support the community. Her recent work combines these two areas in the study of women social entrepreneurs, and their role in challenging and reshaping capitalism and producing progressive social change. Her research area is interdisciplinary, and she has collaborated with researchers in areas ranging from sociology to marketing, finance, management, and property studies.

De Bruin, in collaboration with sociologist Christine Read, studied the reaction of Ngāi Tahu's Takahanga Marae in Kaikōura to the devastating 2016 Kaikōura earthquake. Their work concluded that Māori social relationships form a support network that could be a source of resilience in times of crisis.

With her PhD student Bruce Borquist she has studied the role of social enterprises in religious organisations. Traditionally, the work of churches and other religious groups has been funded by donations, but increasingly their social and community work relies on hybrid organisations that have both social and economic goals. De Bruin's research examines the relationship between this kind of entrepreneurship and an organisation's religious values.

== Selected works ==
- de Bruin, Anne; Shaw, Eleanor; Lewis, Kate V. (2017). "The collaborative dynamic in social entrepreneurship". Entrepreneurship & Regional Development. 29 (7–8): 575–585. doi:10.1080/08985626.2017.1328902. S2CID 217541306.
- de Bruin, Anne; Jelinčić, Daniela Angelina (2016). "Toward extending creative tourism: participatory experience tourism". Tourism Review. 71 (1): 57–66. doi:10.1108/TR-05-2015-0018.
- Shaw, Eleanor; de Bruin, Anne (2013). "Reconsidering capitalism: the promise of social innovation and social entrepreneurship?". International Small Business Journal: Researching Entrepreneurship. 31 (7): 737–746. doi:10.1177/0266242613497494. S2CID 153643791.
- de Bruin, Anne M.; Ferrante, Francesco M. (2011). "Bounded Opportunity: A Knowledge-Based Approach to Opportunity Recognition and Development". Entrepreneurship Research Journal. 1 (4). doi:10.2202/2157-5665.1018.
- de Bruin, Anne; Brush, Candida G.; Welter, Friederike (2007). "Advancing a Framework for Coherent Research on Women's Entrepreneurship". Entrepreneurship Theory and Practice. 31 (3): 323–339. doi:10.1111/j.1540-6520.2007.00176.x. S2CID 144291414.
- Brush, Candida G.; de Bruin, Anne; Welter, Friederike (2009). "A gender-aware framework for women's entrepreneurship". International Journal of Gender and Entrepreneurship. 1 (1): 8–24. doi:10.1108/17566260910942318.
- de Bruin, Anne; Brush, Candida G.; Welter, Friederike (2006). "Introduction to the Special Issue: Towards Building Cumulative Knowledge on Women's Entrepreneurship". Entrepreneurship Theory and Practice. 30 (5): 585–593. doi:10.1111/j.1540-6520.2006.00137.x. S2CID 145614051.
- de Bruin, Anne; Dupuis, Anne, eds. (2003). Entrepreneurship: New Perspectives in a Global Age. Aldershot, Hampshire, England: Ashgate. ISBN 0-7546-3198-2. OCLC 50958874. (de Bruin contributed two chapters to this book and co-authored another eight.)
- Cremer, Rolf D.; De Bruin, Anne; Dupuis, Ann (2001). "International Sister-Cities: Bridging the Global-Local Divide". American Journal of Economics and Sociology. 60 (1): 377–401. doi:10.1111/1536-7150.00066.
