= JIE =

The JIE may be:

- Journal of Interdisciplinary Economics, an academic journal in the United Kingdom
- Jakarta International Expo, an exhibition center in Jakarta, Indonesia
- Joint Information Environment, an abstraction of the United States Department of Defense joint computer networks
