= Tamati Reedy =

New Zealand Māori academic and public servant (1936–2026)

Sir Tamati Reedy KNZM
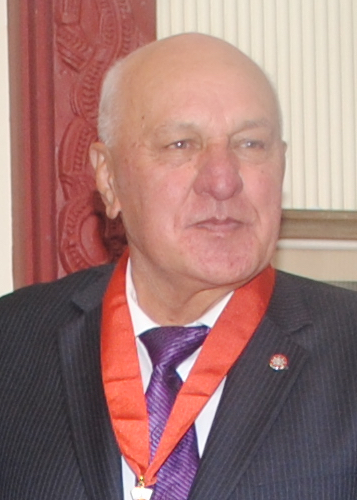
- Reedy in 2011
- Born: Tamati Muturangi Reedy; 16 July 1936; Ruatoria, New Zealand
- Died: 21 May 2026 (aged 89); Wellington, New Zealand
- Spouse: Tilly Moeke
- Children: Eight
- Relatives: Materoa Reedy (grandmother); Arnold Reedy (uncle); Virginia Warriner (niece)

Academic background
- Education: University of Hawaiʻi
- Thesis: Complex sentence formation in Maori (1979)

Academic work
- Discipline: Linguistics
- Institutions: University of Waikato

Rugby union career
- Positions: Wing; fullback
Provincial / State sides
Years	Team	Apps	(Points)
1956–1962	East Coast	38	(52)
1959	Poverty Bay–East Coast	2	(9)
1963–1964	Thames Valley	10	(20)
International career
Years	Team	Apps	(Points)
1960	Māori All Blacks	5	(3)

Sir Tamati Muturangi Reedy KNZM (16 July 1936 – 21 May 2026) was a New Zealand Māori academic, public servant and rugby union player. He served as secretary of the Department of Maori Affairs between 1983 and 1989, during which time he was involved in the Māori loans affair. He was the foundation dean and professor of the School of Māori and Pacific Development at the University of Waikato in 1996, and was later the professor of Māori sustainable enterprise in the School of Management at Waikato. He was knighted, for services to education, in 2011.

== Background ==
Reedy was born in Ruatoria on 16 July 1936, the son of Iritana Te Arohanui Hakuwai Reedy (née Haig) and Kotuku Rerengatahi Reedy, and affiliates to Ngāti Porou. On his father's side, his grandmother was Materoa Reedy and his uncle was Arnold Reedy. His niece is Professor Virginia Warriner. He was raised on Kaitoko Station in the Maraehara River valley, in the home of his maternal grandparents, Hirini and Henrietta Haig, and educated at Hiruharama Native School and Manutahi Maori District High School in Ruatoria, where he was dux in 1953. Reedy went on to train as a schoolteacher at Wellington Teachers' Training College.

He married Tilly Te Koingo Moeke, also of Ngāti Porou from Ruatoria and a teacher trainee at the time, and they had eight children. One of their daughters, Mei Reedy-Taare, contested Te Tai Tonga for the Māori Party at the 2017 general election.

In 1956, Reedy served a period of compulsory military training.

Reedy died on 21 May 2026, at the age of 89. He had been predeceased by his wife, Tilly, Lady Reedy, earlier that year, in March.

== Rugby union ==
A wing and fullback, Reedy was a member of the Hikurangi Rugby Club, and played for the East Coast representative team from 1956 to 1962. Over that period he played 38 matches for East Coast, scoring 13 tries (worth three points at the time), five conversions and one penalty goal, for a total of 52 points. In 1959, Reedy played two matches for a combined Poverty Bay–East Coast side, including one against the touring British Isles team at Rugby Park, Gisborne, in which he scored two tries.

In May 1959, Reedy appeared in a regional All Black trial for players from the East Coast, Poverty Bay, Hawke's Bay, Wairarapa and Bush unions, in which he scored a try. He did not, however, gain selection for the national team.

Reedy played in trial matches for New Zealand Maori in 1958, 1959, and 1960. In 1960, he was selected on the wing for the New Zealand Maori team toured Tonga and Samoa in May and June of that year. On that tour, he played in five matches, and scored one try. The try came in the 27–16 loss to Tonga in Nukuʻalofa, in which Reedy and Mack Herewini were described as the "pick of the backs". He also played in the 28–6 victory over Western Samoa in Apia two weeks later.

From 1963 to 1964, Reedy represented Thames Valley, appearing in 10 matches and scoring four conversions, three penalty goals and one drop goal.

== Career ==
From 1956 to 1969, Reedy was a teacher in primary and secondary schools. During this time, we also studied for a Bachelor of Arts degree at the University of Auckland, graduating in 1968. Between 1970 and 1973, he lectured at the Auckland Secondary Teachers' College, and in 1972 he completed a Master of Arts with Honours in English at the University of Auckland. He worked on programme development and administration in the Department of Maori Affairs and Department of Education between 1973 and 1982.

Reedy studied at the University of Hawaiʻi from 1975, graduating with a Master of Arts in linguistics in 1977, and a PhD in 1979. The title of his doctoral thesis was Complex sentence formation in Maori.

From 1982 to 1983, Reedy was a Fulbright scholar and associate professor at the University of Alabama, where he taught courses in linguistics and an anthropology paper, "Peoples of the Pacific".

In 1983, Reedy was appointed secretary of the Department of Maori Affairs. During his tenure, which ended in 1989, the Maori Language Act 1987 was enacted, the Māori Language Commission was established, and the watershed Te Maori exhibition took place (although this was instigated by his predecessor, Kara Puketapu). As part of his responsibilities as secretary, Reedy chaired the Nga Mangai o Te Maori management committee, the institution responsible for co-organising Te Maori. However, he was also embroiled in the Māori loans affair, which tainted his time in office, and led to the dissolution of the department and its ultimate replacement by Te Puni Kōkiri. Between 1983 and 1989, Reedy also sat on the board of the Māori Education Foundation, and in 1989 he was a New Zealand government representative at the Indigenous and Tribal Peoples Convention in Geneva.

With his wife Tilly, Reedy established an educational and research consultancy business, Reedy Holdings Limited, in 1990. As well as providing training to the public and private sectors, they developed the curriculum for Māori immersion centres and played important roles in the development of the kōhanga reo movement. In 1996, he took part in drafting Te Whariki, which became the first national New Zealand early childhood curriculum in 2003.

In 1996, Reedy was appointed the inaugural dean and professor of the School of Māori and Pacific Development at the University of Waikato. In 2001, he became pro-vice chancellor of the university, responsible for Māori development at the institution, and he was made professor of Māori sustainable enterprise in the School of Management in 2005. When he retired in 2009, Reedy was accorded the title of emeritus professor, becoming the first Māori to be so honoured at Waikato.

Reedy was a member of the Waitangi Tribunal between 2010 and 2016.

== Honours and awards ==
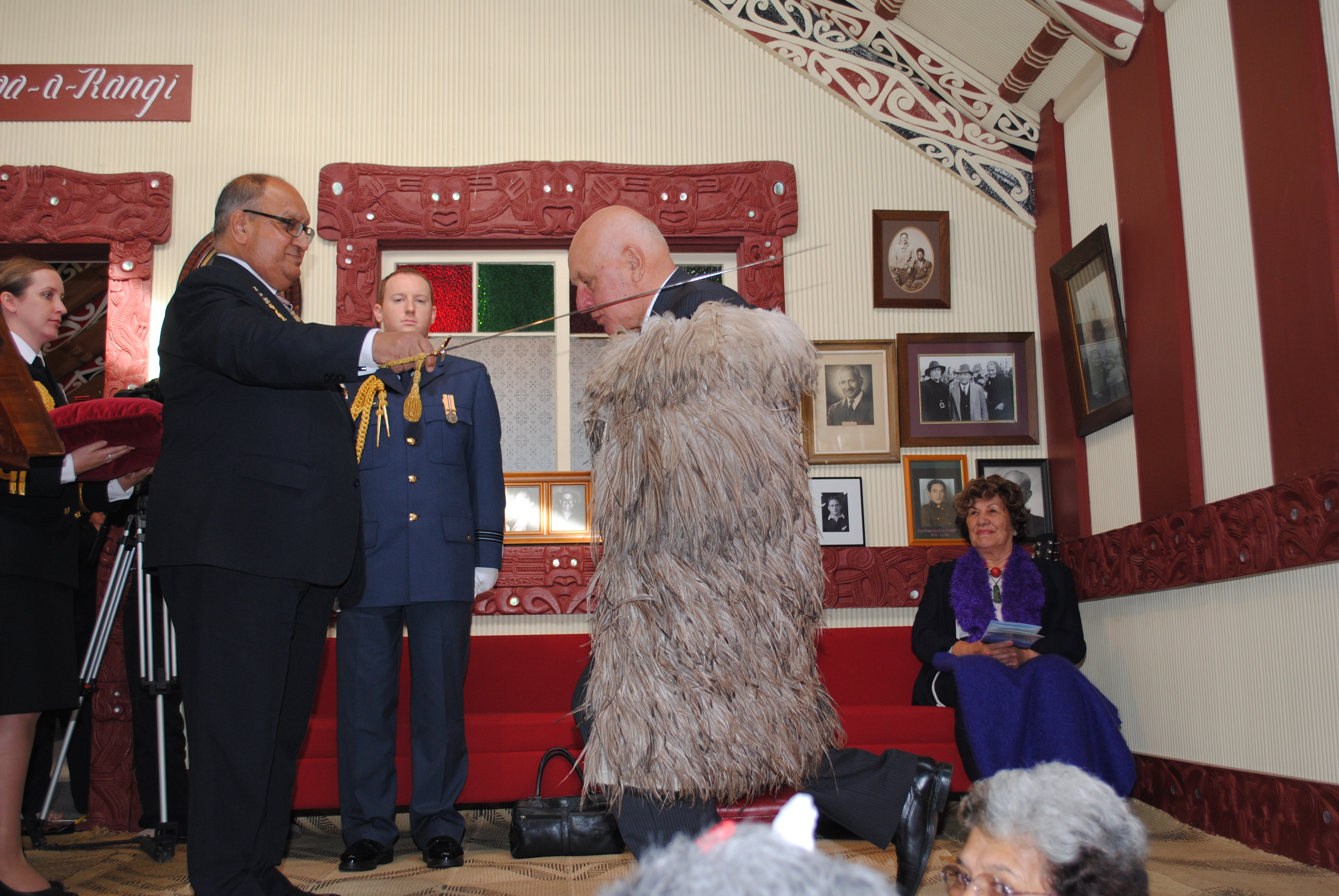
Reedy's investiture as a Knight Companion of the New Zealand Order of Merit, by the governor-general, Anand Satyanand, at Hiruhārama Pā, Ruatoria, on 25 May 2011

Reedy was named as the Young Māori Man of the Year for 1971–1972, and in 1990 he received the New Zealand 1990 Commemoration Medal.

In the 2011 New Year Honours, Reedy was appointed a Knight Companion of the New Zealand Order of Merit, for services to education. His investiture, by the governor-general, Sir Anand Satyanand, took place at Hiruhārama Pā, Ruatoria on 25 May 2011.

At the 2011 Te Waka Toi awards, Reedy received Te Tohu aroha mō Ngoingoi Kumeroa Pewhairangi, "Whakarongo, Titiro, Kōrero", the award for strengthening the Māori language.
