= Bestall =

Bestall is an English surname. Notable people with the name include:

- John Bestall (born 1963), Australian field hockey player
- Jackie Bestall (1900–1985), English footballer and manager
- Alfred Bestall (1892–1986), British writer
- Leonard Delabere Bestall (1895–1959), New Zealand architect, draper, museum director and benefactor
- Maysie Bestall-Cohen (born 1945), New Zealand model

== See also ==
- Besta (disambiguation)
