= 1967 Eastern Maori by-election =

New Zealand by-election

- 12 August 1967
- Turnout: 9,012 (60.70%)
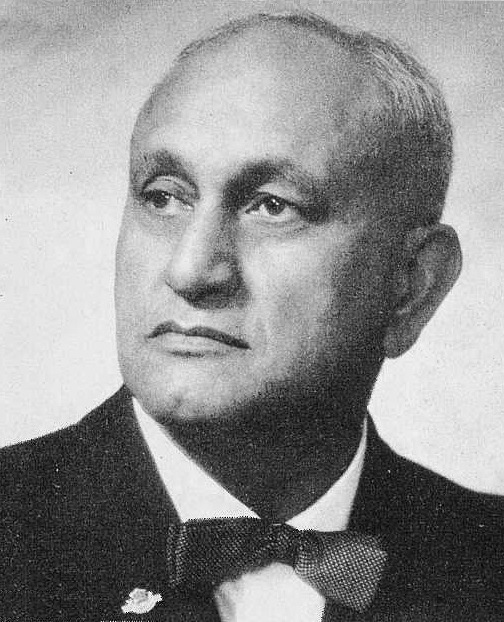

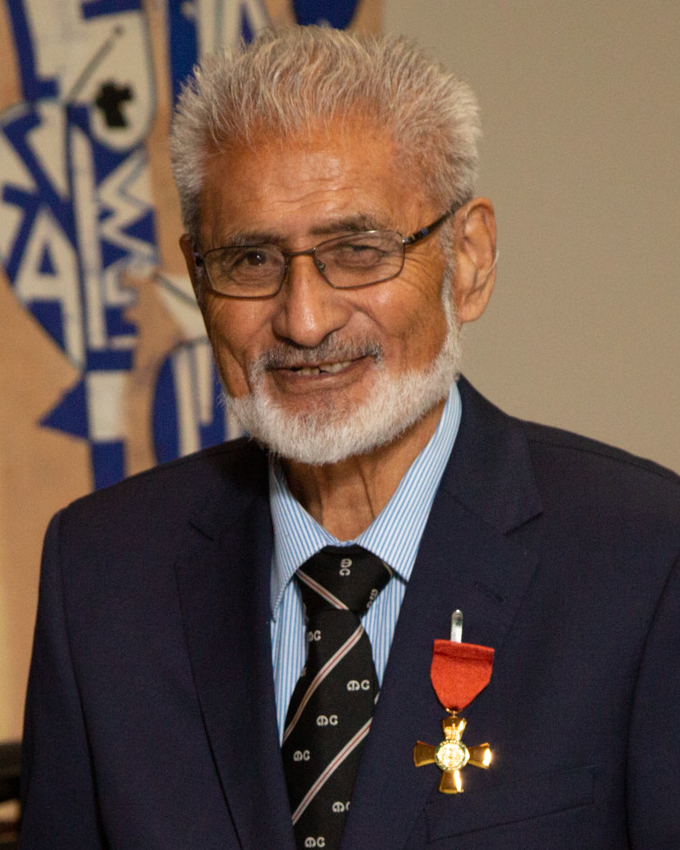
| Candidate | Paraone Reweti | Arnold Reedy | Maanu Paul |
| Party | Labour | National | Social Credit |
| Popular vote | 4,460 | 2,416 | 1,219 |
| Percentage | 49.49 | 26.81 | 13.53 |
MP before election
Puti Tipene Watene
Labour
Elected MP
Paraone Reweti
Labour

The 1967 Eastern Māori by-election was a by-election for the electorate of Eastern Maori on 12 August 1967 during the 35th New Zealand Parliament.

== Background ==
The by-election resulted from the death of the previous member Puti Tipene Watene on 14 June 1967.

== Candidates ==
Labour

Labour selected Paraone Brown Reweti, a waterfront worker from Tauranga, as their candidate. He was selected from a large field of nominees at a meeting in Rotorua. The party did not disclose the exact amount, but indicated the number was about 15.

Two days after the selection meeting another meeting was held by supporters of unsuccessful nominees alleging irregularities in the selection and claiming that a member of the selection panel was biased as they had nominated one of the candidates. The rift group later sent a telegram to Labour Party head office to Allan McDonald, the general secretary of the party. The telegram contained details of the allegations and stated Reweti's selection was an "indictment against the Labour Party" and threatened to stand an independent candidate in protest.

The selection dispute resulted in an independent candidate, Donald Mairangi Bennett, being selected by the rift group. Bennett, a car salesman, was a son of Bishop Frederick Bennett. The group said they were standing not as a protest not against Reweti, but against a protest against the method by which he was selected.

National

The National Party had two candidates for nomination:

- Hanara Tangiwha (Arnold) Reedy, a farmer from Ruatoria who had stood in the seat for National in 1963 and 1966
- Monty Searancke, an employee of the Waterfront Industry Commission and former member of the Gisborne Native Affairs Department

Reedy was selected in a members ballot after which Searancke pledged his support for Reedy and undertook to accompany him on an electoral tour.

== Results ==
The following table gives the election results:

1967 Eastern Maori by-election
| Party | Candidate | Votes | % | ±% |
|---|---|---|---|---|
| Labour | Paraone Reweti | 4,460 | 49.49 | |
| National | Arnold Reedy | 2,416 | 26.81 | −3.93 |
| Social Credit | Maanu Paul | 1,219 | 13.53 | +3.11 |
| Independent Maori | Don Bennett | 671 | 7.45 | |
| Independent | Te Okanga Huata | 246 | 2.73 | |
| Majority | | 2,044 | 22.68 | |
| Turnout | | 9,012 | 60.70 | −15.58 |
| Registered electors | | 14,849 | | |
| Labour hold | | Swing | | |

The by-election was won by Paraone Reweti, also of the Labour Party.
