= Tiaki Omana =

New Zealand politician and rugby union footballer (1891–1970)

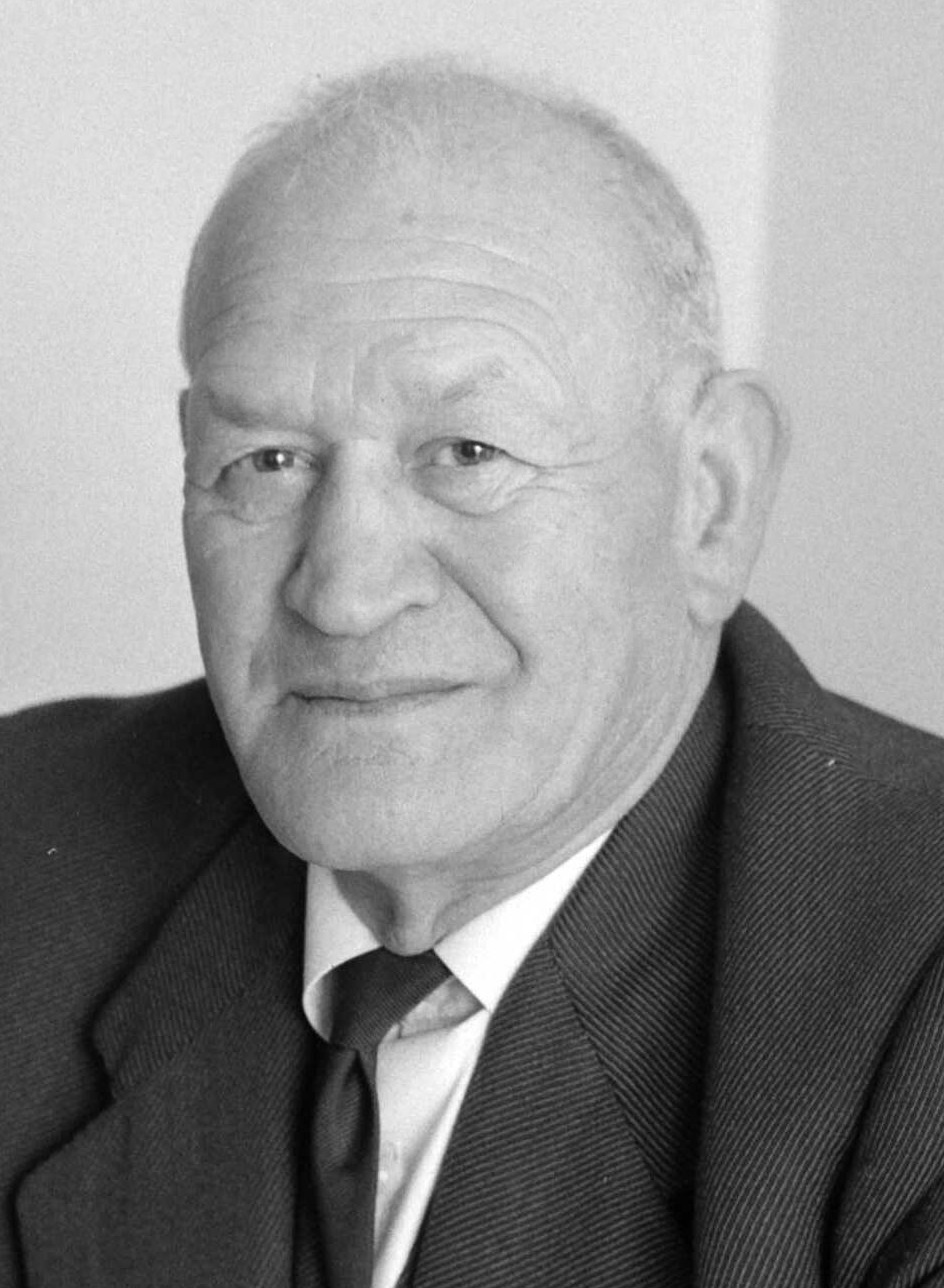
- Omana in 1959

Member of the New Zealand Parliament for Eastern Maori
- In office 24 September 1943 – 30 November 1963
- Preceded by: Āpirana Ngata
- Succeeded by: Puti Tipene Watene

Personal details
- Born: John Ormond; 18 December 1891 Māhia Peninsula, New Zealand
- Died: 24 June 1970 (aged 78) Napier, New Zealand
- Party: Labour
- Relations: John Davies Ormond (grandfather)
- Children: 3

Rugby union career
- Position: Loose forward
Provincial / State sides
Years	Team	Apps	(Points)
1923–25	Hawke's Bay	20	
International career
Years	Team	Apps	(Points)
1923	New Zealand	1	(0)

Tiaki Omana (18 December 1891 – 24 June 1970), also known by the English name Jack Ormond, was a New Zealand rugby union player and politician. He won the Rātana Movement's fourth Maori electorate of Eastern Maori in 1943 from Āpirana Ngata who had held it since 1905.

== Biography ==
=== Early life ===
He was born John (Jack) Ormond on 18 December 1891 at Mahia, but became commonly known as Tiaki Omana. He was the fourth child of George Canning Ormond, a sheepfarmer, and Maraea Kiwi Wharekete (Ngāti Kahungunu). He was of aristocratic Ngāti Rongomaiwahine descent and was also a grandson of John Davies Ormond, first Superintendent of Hawke's Bay.

A keen rugby player, even after joining the New Zealand (Māori) Pioneer Battalion and fighting in France during World War I, he was still able to play on the wing for the Pioneer Battalion team. Omana played Ranfurly Shield matches for his province, Hawke's Bay, and once for the All Blacks in 1923 against a touring team from New South Wales.

Omana was a sheepfarmer on the isolated Māhia Peninsula before becoming a Member of Parliament.

=== Member of Parliament ===
New Zealand Parliament
Years	Term	Electorate	Party
1943–1946	27th	Eastern Maori	Labour
1946–1949	28th	Eastern Maori	Labour
1949–1951	29th	Eastern Maori	Labour
1951–1954	30th	Eastern Maori	Labour
1954–1957	31st	Eastern Maori	Labour
1957–1960	32nd	Eastern Maori	Labour
1960–1963	33rd	Eastern Maori	Labour

A koata of the 'second cut', Omana first contested the Tairawhiti electorate of Eastern Maori in 1935, finally winning the electorate in 1943. As a Rātana/Labour member, he raised the issue of land claims, housing and health for Māori, and discrimination in social security. Omana held the electorate until his retirement in 1963, when he returned to farming and to his original Church of England faith.

In 1953, Omana was awarded the Queen Elizabeth II Coronation Medal.

Former press gallery reporter Leslie Hobbs wrote that "Jack Omana, was one of the most popular and respected members of the House, but he never worked up any enthusiasm for party politics, particularly the fighting side of it. He liked everyone too much and everyone liked him." He was noted as frequently bringing boxes of kumara grown his farm in Mahia back to Wellington as presents for his friend, but political adversary, Keith Holyoake (a fellow farmer).

=== Death ===
Omana died on 24 June 1970 at Napier and was buried at Mokotahi, Mahia Beach.

== Personal life ==
Omana married Nellie Airini Elizabeth Perry at the Cathedral Church of St John the Evangelist in Napier on 23 February 1921. The couple had twin children, a girl and a boy. They soon divorced on 29 November 1922. He later remarried to Polly Gemmell on 6 February 1926 at Wairoa. They had one child, a daughter who died in infancy. Polly herself died in 1949. Omana married a third time to Rangiwhakio Rarere (née Kemara), a widow, at Wairoa on 15 March 1962. She died soon after in November that same year.

== Ratana name ==
Tiaki Omana was also referred to as Hamuera after Tahupōtiki Wiremu Rātana's son Hamuera Ratana, symbol of the end of tohunga witchcraft.

== Notes ==
New Zealand Parliament
Preceded by Āpirana Ngata	Member of Parliament for Eastern Maori; 1943–1963	Succeeded by Puti Tipene Watene
