= Virginia Warriner =

New Zealand professor of business

Academic background
- Education: Massey University
- Thesis: Internationalisation of Maori businesses in the creative industry sector: ko te rerenga o te toki a tu, he whare oranga (2009)
- Doctoral advisor: John Monin, Anne de Bruin

Academic work
- Institutions: Te Whare Wānanga o Awanuiārangi

Virginia Carolyn Ann Warriner is a New Zealand Māori academic, and is a full professor at Te Whare Wānanga o Awanuiārangi, specialising in business, leadership for Māori women, and Indigenous management practices. Warriner is a board member of Te Rūnanga o Ngāti Whatua Board, and a trustee of Ngā Uri o Kamupene ‘A’ o Rua Tekau Mā Waru – the Descendants of ‘A’ Company 28 Māori Battalion Trust.

== Academic career ==
Warriner is Māori, and affiliates to Ngāti Whatua and Ngāti Porou iwi. Her uncle is Waikato University Professor Emeritus Tamati Reedy. Warriner was described as a 'bookworm' by her aunt, and when she graduated with her PhD said that she had 'always wanted to be a professor' like her uncle.

Warriner completed a PhD titled Internationalisation of Maori businesses in the creative industry sector: ko te rerenga o te toki a tu, he whare oranga at Massey University, which investigated the drivers and barriers to internationalisation for businesses before, during and after becoming exporters. Her thesis was supervised by John Monin and Anne de Bruin. Warriner then joined the faculty of Te Whare Wānanga o Awanuiārangi, based at Whakatāne, where she was promoted to full professor in 2016. She is the co-ordinator of the School of Indigenous Graduate Studies' doctoral programme.

Warriner serves on the Te Rūnanga o Ngāti Whatua Board as the Otamatea Takiwa representative. She is also a trustee of Ngā Uri o Kamupene ‘A’ o Rua Tekau Mā Waru – the Descendants of ‘A’ Company 28 Māori Battalion Trust. Warriner has also been involved in governorship and treaty settlement for Ngāti Porou, and participated in the Iwi Leaders Forum.
