= Robert Pānapa Tūtaki =

Robert Pānapa Tūtaki MBE (c.1887 – 27 September 1957), also known as Tutaki Panapa Stewart and Robert Tutaki Panapa, was a New Zealand shearer and trade unionist.

Of Māori descent, he identified with the Ngāti Kahungunu iwi. He was born in Ruahapia, Hawke's Bay, New Zealand, in about 1887. He stood for the Labour Party in the 1928 election in the Eastern Maori electorate against Āpirana Ngata and came third, with 3.6% of the vote.

In the 1949 King's Birthday Honours, Tutaki was appointed a Member of the Order of the British Empire for services in connection with the organisation of Māori shearers during World War II.
