= 1949 Birthday Honours (New Zealand) =

Awards list for New Zealand

The 1949 King's Birthday Honours in New Zealand, celebrating the official birthday of King George VI, were appointments made by the King on the advice of the New Zealand government to various orders and honours to reward and highlight good works by New Zealanders. They were announced on 9 June 1949.

The recipients of honours are displayed here as they were styled before their new honour.

== Knight Bachelor ==
- The Honourable Erima Harvey Northcroft DSO – judge of the Supreme Court.
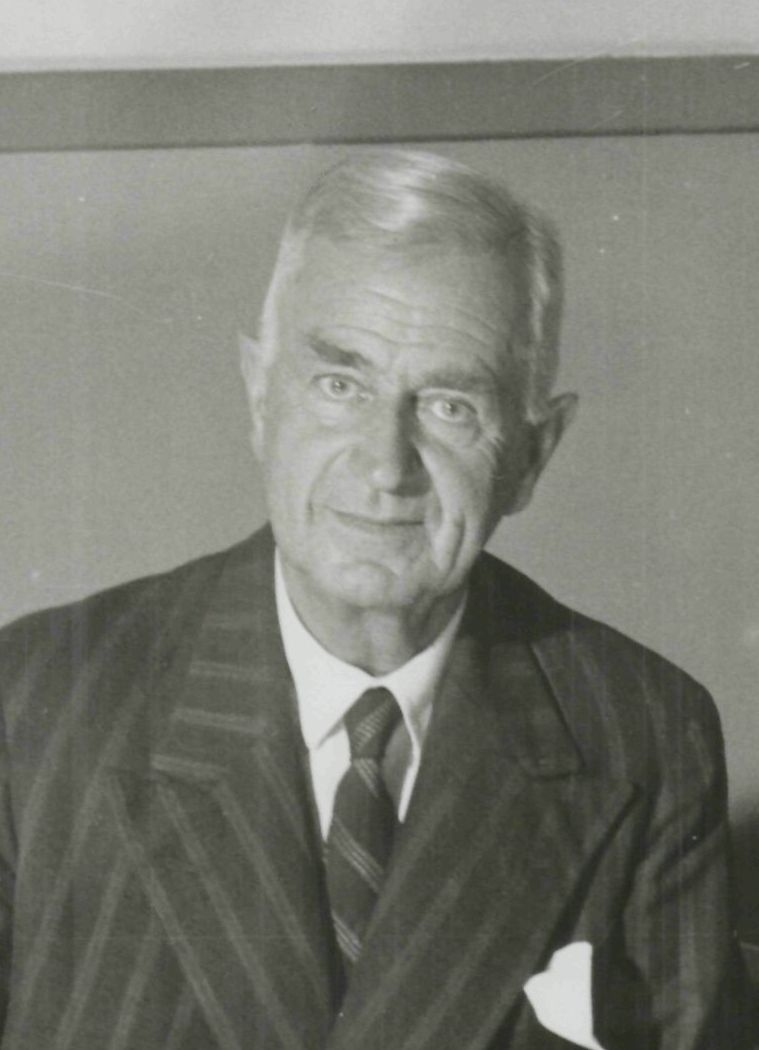
Sir Erima Northcroft

== Order of Saint Michael and Saint George ==
=== Companion (CMG) ===
- Dr David Ernest Hansen – of Christchurch. For outstanding services in the field of technical education.
- The Reverend Arthur John Seamer – of Hamilton. For outstanding services in connection with mission work among the Māori.

== Order of the British Empire ==
=== Knight Commander (KBE) ===
Civil division

- Joseph William Allan Heenan CBE – formerly undersecretary of Internal Affairs, New Zealand.
- James Shelley MA – of Wellington. For outstanding services in the fields of education, broadcasting and drama.

=== Commander (CBE) ===
Civil division

- Gordon Herriot Cunningham DSc PhD – of Auckland. For services in the field of plant research and plant diseases in New Zealand.
- James Sawers – formerly general manager, New Zealand Railways.
- Lieutenant-Colonel Francis William Voelcker DSO MC – High Commissioner of Western Samoa.

Military division

- Acting Group Captain George Ernest Watt AFC – Royal Air Force.

=== Officer (OBE) ===
Civil division

- Miss Margharita Elizabeth Anderson – of Balclutha. For services as matron of the Balclutha Hospital.
- Philip Barling – of Dunedin. For valuable public services.
- John Andrew Dempsey – of Wellington. For valuable services with New Zealand Police Force.
- Miss Elsie Mary Haines – of Wellington. For services in connection with organisation and training of dental nurses.
- Kirihi Te Riri Maihi Kawiti – of Bay of Islands. For valuable services to the Māori people.
- William Morrison – of Wanganui, formerly president of the New Zealand Counties Association. For valuable public services.
- Percy Shaw – of Auckland. For valuable public services especially in connection with the establishment of a chair of obstetrics and gynaecology at Auckland University College.
- Riki Te Mairiki Taiaroa – of Leeston. For valuable services to the Māori people.
- Nugent Herrmann Welch – of Wellington. For valuable services in the field of art in New Zealand.

Military division

- Commander Leo Patrick Bourke DSC RD – Royal New Zealand Navy.
- Lieutenant-Colonel (temporary) John Dickenson Armstrong – New Zealand Regiment.
- Squadron Leader Alston Leonard Partelow – Royal New Zealand Air Force.
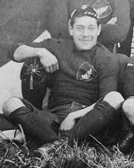
Riki Taiaroa

=== Member (MBE) ===
Civil division

- Leonard Delabere Bestall – of Napier. For services in the fields of art and music.
- James Davidson Harper – of Wellington. For services in the interests of returned servicemen.
- Theodore Wright Leslie – of Wellington. For long services in the field of sport.
- Mrs Mary Ann McIntyre – of Dunedin. For services in connection with welfare work in Dunedin.
- William Morton – of Auckland. For long services in connection with amateur sport in New Zealand.
- Miss Mary Elizabeth O'Shea – of Ashburton. For services as obstetrical nurse at Granity.
- Mrs Ethel Watkins Taylor Pritchard – of Gisborne. For long services as district nurse and honorary child welfare officer.
- Claude Page Reilly – of Nelson. For long services to the community particularly in the sphere of school committee work.
- Miss Edna Scott – of Wellington. For services in connection with kindergarten work.
- Miss Constance Smedley – of Whangārei. For long service as district nurse and inspector in the North Auckland district.
- Robert Tutaki Panapa Stewart – of Hastings. For services in connection with the organisation of Māori shearers during the war years.
- The Reverend Hadden Kingston Vickery – of Auckland. For services as chaplain to the Flying Angel Missions to Seamen.
- James Edward Weir – of Auckland. For services as secretary to YMCA with HMNZS Philomel.
- Miss Claire Elizabeth Wylie – of Dunedin. For services as head teacher at the Special School at Otekaieke.

Military division

- Acting Lieutenant (E) Thomas George Ernest Hallin – Royal New Zealand Navy.
- Temporary Lieutenant (Sp.) James Hutton MA LLB – Royal New Zealand Naval Volunteer Reserve.
- Warrant Officer Class I Edward Coleman – Royal New Zealand Army Ordnance Corps.
- Captain (Quartermaster) Donald William Stewart – New Zealand Regular Force.
- Flight Lieutenant Stanley George Thompson – Royal New Zealand Air Force.
- Warrant Officer John William Moynihan – Royal New Zealand Air Force.

== Companion of the Imperial Service Order (ISO) ==
- Alexander Ferguson McMurtrie – of Lower Hutt. For valuable services in the field of education in New Zealand.

== British Empire Medal (BEM) ==
Military division

- Chief Petty Officer Cook (S) Wallace William Martin – Royal New Zealand Navy.
- Chief Mechanician Charles William Norris – Royal New Zealand Navy.
- Staff-Sergeant William Elmer Caddick – New Zealand Regiment.
- Warrant Officer Class I (temporary) Joseph Scanlon Underdown – Royal New Zealand Army Medical Corps.
- Flight Sergeant George William Lewis – Royal New Zealand Air Force.
- Flight Sergeant James Albert McMillan – Royal New Zealand Air Force.
- Corporal James David Brown – Royal New Zealand Air Force.
- Corporal lone Nancy McIntyre – New Zealand Women's Auxiliary Air Force.
