= Besta =

Besta may refer to:

- BESTA (e-learning), a brand of Inventec Besta for electronic dictionaries
- Inventec Besta, a subsidiary of Inventec
- Aleš Besta, Czech footballer
- Pavel Besta, Czech footballer
- Petra Besta (born 1967), Czech-born Australian handball player

== See also ==
- Bestall
