= Nugent Welch =

New Zealand painter (1881–1970)

- Born: 30 July 1881; Akaroa, New Zealand
- Died: 16 July 1970 (aged 88); Wellington, New Zealand
- Known for: Painting

Nugent Herrmann Welch OBE (30 July 1881 – 16 July 1970) was a notable New Zealand artist. He was born in Akaroa, New Zealand, in 1881. He was appointed an Officer of the Order of the British Empire in the 1949 King's Birthday Honours for services to art in New Zealand.
