= Eastern Maori =

Eastern Maori was one of New Zealand's four original parliamentary Māori electorates established in 1868, along with Northern Maori, Western Maori and Southern Maori. In 1996, with the introduction of MMP, the Maori electorates were updated, and Eastern Maori was replaced with the Te Tai Rawhiti and Te Puku O Te Whenua electorates.

== Population centres ==
The electorate included the population centres of Kawerau, Rotorua and Whakatāne.

== Tribal areas ==
The electorate included the tribal areas of Ngāti Awa, Te Arawa, Ngāi Tai, Te Whakatōhea and Ngāti Porou.

== History ==
Eastern Maori included Rotorua and the Bay of Plenty, and the Poverty Bay area down to Gisborne. Originally the electorate extended down the East Coast and included the Wairarapa, but in 1954 the boundaries of the Southern Maori electorate were extended to include much of the East Coast of the North Island up to Napier and Wairoa in Hawke's Bay.

The first Member of Parliament for Eastern Maori was Tāreha Te Moananui, elected in 1868; he was the first Māori MP to speak in Parliament, and he retired in 1870.

James Carroll represented the electorate from 1887 to 1893, but in 1893 he changed to the Waiapu electorate and was replaced by Wi Pere who Carroll had defeated in 1887.

In the 1949 election, the incumbent, Tiaki Ōmana of the Labour Party, was unsuccessfully challenged by National's Turi Carroll.

In the 1963 election, Puti Tīpene Wātene was elected. He was a Mormon and was the first non-Rātana to win a Māori seat since 1938.

With MMP Eastern Maori was replaced by the Te Tai Rawhiti electorate in 1996. Peter Tapsell, who had represented Eastern Maori since 1981 was defeated when he stood in the new electorate.

=== Members of Parliament ===
The Eastern Maori electorate was represented by ten Members of Parliament:

Key

Independent Liberal United National Labour

Election	Winner
1868 Māori election	Tāreha Te Moananui
1871 election	Karaitiana Takamoana
1876 election	Karaitiana Takamoana
1879 by-election	Hēnare Tomoana
1879 election	Hēnare Tomoana
1881 election	Hēnare Tomoana
1884 election	Wi Pere
1887 election	James Carroll
1890 election	James Carroll
1893 election	Wi Pere (2nd period)
1896 election	Wi Pere (2nd period)
1899 election	Wi Pere (2nd period)
1902 election	Wi Pere (2nd period)
1905 election	Āpirana Ngata
1908 election	Āpirana Ngata
1911 election	Āpirana Ngata
1914 election	Āpirana Ngata
1919 election	Āpirana Ngata
1922 election	Āpirana Ngata
1925 election	Āpirana Ngata
1928 election	Āpirana Ngata
1931 election	Āpirana Ngata
1935 election	Āpirana Ngata
1938 election	Āpirana Ngata
1943 election	Tiaki Ōmana
1946 election	Tiaki Ōmana
1949 election	Tiaki Ōmana
1951 election	Tiaki Ōmana
1954 election	Tiaki Ōmana
1957 election	Tiaki Ōmana
1960 election	Tiaki Ōmana
1963 election	Puti Tīpene Wātene
1966 election	Puti Tīpene Wātene
1967 by-election	Paraone Reweti
1969 election	Paraone Reweti
1972 election	Paraone Reweti
1975 election	Paraone Reweti
1978 election	Paraone Reweti
1981 election	Peter Tapsell
1984 election	Peter Tapsell
1987 election	Peter Tapsell
1990 election	Peter Tapsell
1993 election	Peter Tapsell

== Election results ==
Note that the affiliation of many early candidates is not known.

=== 1993 election ===
1993 general election: Eastern Maori
Party	Candidate	Votes	%	±%
Labour	Peter Tapsell	9,311	63.52	−7.40
Alliance	Alamein Kopu	2,645	18.04	
Mana Māori	Tame Iti	1,388	9.46	
National	Jim Gray	664	4.52	
Christian Heritage	Mere Wirepa	404	2.75	
Natural Law	Molly Para	246	1.67	
Majority		6,666	45.47	−7.95
Turnout		14,658	61.64	+0.37
Registered electors		23,779		

=== 1990 election ===
1990 general election: Eastern Maori
Party	Candidate	Votes	%	±%
Labour	Peter Tapsell	9,085	70.92	−3.19
Mana Motuhake	Wi Kuki Kaa	2,241	17.49	
National	Jim Ngatai Connelly	1,484	11.58	
Majority		6,844	53.42	−7.08
Turnout		12,810	61.27	−9.24
Registered electors		20,906		

=== 1987 election ===
1987 general election: Eastern Maori
Party	Candidate	Votes	%	±%
Labour	Peter Tapsell	10,653	74.11	−10.07
Mana Motuhake	Amster Reedy	1,957	13.61	
National	Jim Gray	1,321	9.19	
Democrats	G M Ngakaru	442	3.07	
Majority		8,696	60.50	−16.45
Turnout		14,373	70.51	−7.28
Registered electors		20,384		

=== 1984 election ===
1984 general election: Eastern Maori
Party	Candidate	Votes	%	±%
Labour	Peter Tapsell	12,285	84.18	+20.39
National	Barry Kiwara	1,055	7.22	
Mana Motuhake	Bert McLean	575	3.94	
NZ Party	Rawinia Heremaia	400	2.74	
Social Credit	T K Te Aweawe	277	1.89	
Majority		11,230	76.95	−0.35
Turnout		14,592	77.79	+0.49
Registered electors		18,757		

=== 1981 election ===
1981 general election: Eastern Maori
Party	Candidate	Votes	%	±%
Labour	Peter Tapsell	8,222	63.79	
Mana Motuhake	Albert Tahana	1,990	15.43	
National	Charles Little	1,505	11.67	
Social Credit	R T Tibble	1,172	9.09	
Majority		6,232	48.35	
Turnout		12,889	77.30	+26.02
Registered electors		16,673		

=== 1978 election ===
1978 general election: Eastern Maori
Party	Candidate	Votes	%	±%
Labour	Paraone Reweti	9,085	74.79	+0.81
National	Monty Searancke	1,685	13.87	−5.56
Social Credit	T Te Hira	1,195	9.83	
Values	H Te M Kaa	182	1.49	
Majority		7,400	60.92	+6.37
Turnout		12,147	51.28	−18.53
Registered electors		23,684		

=== 1975 election ===
1975 general election: Eastern Maori
Party	Candidate	Votes	%	±%
Labour	Paraone Reweti	8,491	73.98	+1.33
National	Monty Searancke	2,230	19.43	
Social Credit	Manu Te Pere	548	4.77	
Values	Danny Stevens	208	1.81	
Majority		6,261	54.55	+3.63
Turnout		11,477	69.81	−16.19
Registered electors		16,439		

=== 1972 election ===
1972 general election: Eastern Maori
Party	Candidate	Votes	%	±%
Labour	Paraone Reweti	8,831	72.65	+10.64
National	Koro Dewes	2,641	21.72	
Social Credit	R Rangi	505	4.15	
New Democratic	T T Clarke	177	1.45	
Majority		6,190	50.92	+21.09
Turnout		12,154	86.00	+2.84
Registered electors		14,131		

=== 1969 election ===
1969 general election: Eastern Maori
Party	Candidate	Votes	%	±%
Labour	Paraone Reweti	7,247	62.01	+12.52
National	Henare Ngata	3,760	32.17	
Social Credit	Maanu Paul	679	5.81	−7.72
Majority		3,487	29.83	+7.15
Turnout		11,686	83.16	+22.46
Registered electors		14,051		

=== 1967 by-election ===
1967 Eastern Maori by-election
Party	Candidate	Votes	%	±%
Labour	Paraone Reweti	4,460	49.49	
National	Arnold Reedy	2,416	26.81	−3.93
Social Credit	Maanu Paul	1,219	13.53	+3.11
Independent Maori	Don Bennett	671	7.45	
Independent	Te Okanga Huata	246	2.73	
Majority		2,044	22.68	
Turnout		9,012	60.70	−15.58
Registered electors		14,849		
Labour hold		Swing		

=== 1966 election ===
1966 general election: Eastern Maori
Party	Candidate	Votes	%	±%
Labour	Puti Tipene Watene	6,537	58.83	+3.83
National	Arnold Reedy	3,416	30.74	−3.43
Social Credit	Maanu Paul	1,158	10.42	
Majority		3,121	28.08	+7.25
Turnout		11,111	76.28	−7.03
Registered electors		14,566		

=== 1963 election ===
1963 general election: Eastern Maori
Party	Candidate	Votes	%	±%
Labour	Puti Tipene Watene	6,775	55.00	
National	Arnold Reedy	4,209	34.17	+9.49
Social Credit	R W Smith	741	6.01	
Independent	B A Raukopa	230	1.86	
Independent	P H Baker	157	1.27	
Liberal	R Rangi	112	0.90	
Ind. Social Credit	M W Sadler	92	0.74	
Majority		2,566	20.83	
Turnout		12,316	83.31	+3.30
Registered electors		14,783		

=== 1960 election ===
1960 general election: Eastern Maori
Party	Candidate	Votes	%	±%
Labour	Tiaki Omana	5,809	51.49	−8.43
Social Credit	Arnold Reedy	2,784	24.68	+6.25
National	Henry Reiwhati Vercoe	2,496	22.12	
Independent	Mita Carter	191	1.69	
Majority		3,025	26.81	−11.47
Turnout		11,280	80.01	−6.17
Registered electors		14,098		

=== 1957 election ===
1957 general election: Eastern Maori
Party	Candidate	Votes	%	±%
Labour	Tiaki Omana	6,569	59.92	−0.81
National	Wiremu Hoete Maxwell	2,372	21.63	
Social Credit	Arnold Reedy	2,021	18.43	
Majority		4,197	38.28	+11.50
Turnout		10,962	86.18	+1.59
Registered electors		12,719		

=== 1954 election ===
1954 general election: Eastern Maori
Party	Candidate	Votes	%	±%
Labour	Tiaki Omana	7,015	60.73	−2.41
National	Claude Anaru	3,921	33.94	
Social Credit	Wilson Paku	614	5.31	
Majority		3,094	26.78	+0.51
Turnout		11,550	84.59	−13.30
Registered electors		13,654		

=== 1951 election ===
1951 General election: Eastern Maori
Party	Candidate	Votes	%	±%
Labour	Tiaki Omana	8,905	63.14	+1.48
National	Turi Carroll	5,199	36.86	−1.48
Majority		3,706	26.27	+2.94
Turnout		14,104	97.89	−9.79
Registered electors		14,407		

=== 1949 election ===
1949 general election: Eastern Maori
Party	Candidate	Votes	%	±%
Labour	Tiaki Omana	8,487	61.66	+7.68
National	Turi Carroll	5,276	38.34	
Majority		3,211	23.33	+12.15
Turnout		13,763	107.68	
Registered electors		12,781		

The number of electors on Maori rolls was often inaccurate hence the impossible turnout figures.

=== 1946 election ===
1946 general election: Eastern Maori
Party	Candidate	Votes	%	±%
Labour	Tiaki Omana	7,321	53.98	
National	Āpirana Ngata	5,804	42.79	
Informal votes		439	3.23	
Majority		1,517	11.18	
Turnout		13,564		

=== 1931 election ===
1931 general election: Eastern Maori
Party	Candidate	Votes	%	±%
United	Āpirana Ngata	5,105	71.91	+1.70
Ratana	Pita Moko	1,994	28.09	+1.90
Majority		3,111	43.82	
Turnout		7,099		

=== 1928 election ===
1928 general election: Eastern Maori
Party	Candidate	Votes	%	±%
United	Āpirana Ngata	4,950	70.21	
Ratana	Pita Moko	1,846	26.18	
Labour	Robert Panapa Tutaki	254	3.60	
Majority		3,104	44.03	
Turnout		7,050		

=== 1899 election ===
1899 general election: Eastern Maori
Party	Candidate	Votes	%	±%
Liberal	Wi Pere	2,294	40.52	−20.70
	Mohi Te Ātahīkoia	1,387	24.50	
	Hurinui Apanui	1,316	23.25	
	Kereru Numia	331	5.85	
	Tare Mete	207	3.66	−9.86
	Tamati Haweti	126	2.23	
Majority		907	16.02	
Turnout		5,661		

=== 1896 election ===
1896 general election: Eastern Maori
Party	Candidate	Votes	%	±%
Liberal	Wi Pere	2,549	61.22	
	Tamati Tautuhi	805	19.33	
	Tare Mete	563	13.52	
	Maika Taruhe	182	4.37	
	Eriata Nopera	65	1.56	
Majority		1,744	41.88	
Turnout		4,164		

=== 1879 by-election ===
1879 Eastern Maori by-election
Party	Candidate	Votes	%	±%
Independent	Henare Tomoana	652	37.84	
Independent	Henare Matua	583	33.84	
Independent	Hans Tapsell	429	24.90	
Independent	Henare Te Pukuatua	59	3.42	
Majority		69	4.00	
Turnout		1723		
