= Maanu Paul =

New Zealand Māori leader (died 2022)

Maanu Paul ONZM JP
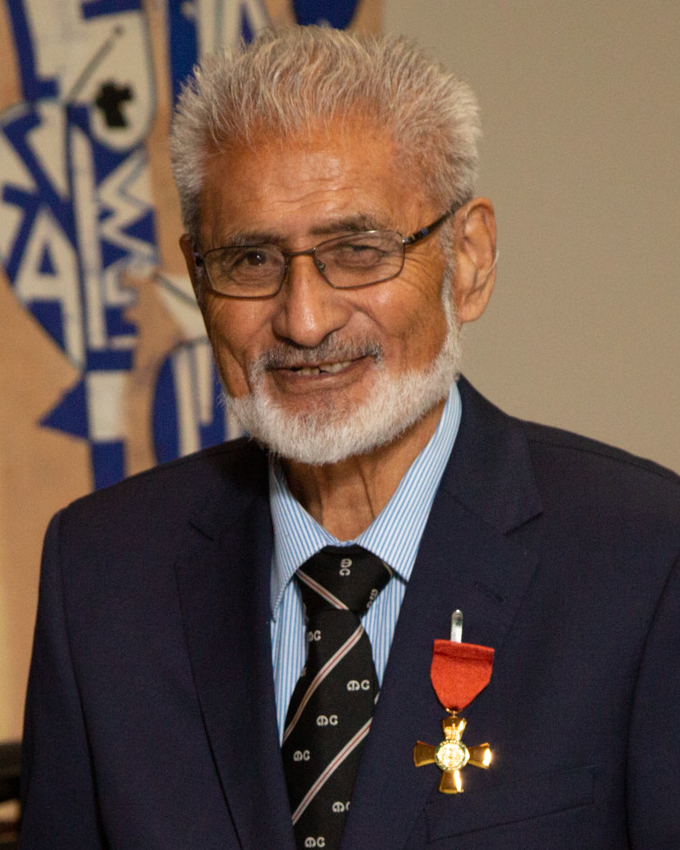
- Paul in 2019
- Born: Cletus Maanu Paul; 18 November 1938; Murupara, New Zealand
- Died: 15 September 2022 (aged 83)
- Education: Hamilton Teachers' College
- Occupations: Surveyor; schoolteacher; orchardist
- Known for: Role in the New Zealand Māori Council
- Spouse: Gwenda Paul
- Children: 5 Alan, Aaron, Edwin, Teresa & Rachel

Cletus Maanu Paul ONZM JP (18 November 1938 – 15 September 2022) was a New Zealand Māori leader. He served as co-chair of the New Zealand Māori Council.

== Early life ==
Born in Murupara on 18 November 1938, Paul affiliated to Ngāti Awa and Ngāti Manawa. After leaving school he worked as a surveyor, but later studied to become a teacher at Hamilton Teachers' College in 1974. His first teaching post was at Hamilton Boys' High School, and in 1975 he took a group of students to take part in the Māori land march when it passed through Hamilton.

== Public life ==
Paul stood as a parliamentary candidate in Eastern Maori representing the Social Credit Political League at three successive elections in the 1960s, finishing in third place on each occasion. At the 1966 general election, he gained 1,158 votes (10.42% of the votes), but his best result came the following year at the 1967 Eastern Maori by-election when he won 13.53 per cent of the vote with 1219 votes. In the 1969 general election, his vote dropped to 679, or 5.81 per cent of the vote.

In 2012, Paul was involved in a legal challenge of the Fifth National Government's programme of partial privatisation of state-owned assets. He was involved in a number of claims to the Waitangi Tribunal, including a claim into the Government's review of the 1962 Maori Community Development Act. Paul also highlighted the danger that falling carbon credits in the New Zealand Emissions Trading Scheme pose to Māori commercial ventures. He advocated the stopping of international carbon credits from being valid in the New Zealand scheme, in order to increase the price of carbon.

In the 2019 Queen's Birthday Honours, Paul was appointed an Officer of the New Zealand Order of Merit, for services to Māori.

== Personal life and death ==
In 2013, it was reported that Paul had cancer and had undergone chemotherapy. He died on 15 September 2022, at the age of 83.
