= Paraone Reweti =

New Zealand politician

Brown Reweti QSO

Member of the New Zealand Parliament for Eastern Maori
- In office 12 August 1967 – 28 November 1981
- Preceded by: Puti Tipene Watene
- Succeeded by: Peter Tapsell

Personal details
- Born: 17 November 1916
- Died: 21 April 1996 (aged 79)
- Party: Labour

Paraone Brown Reweti QSO (17 November 1916 – 21 April 1996) was a New Zealand politician.

== Early life ==
Of Ngāti Ranginui ancestry, Reweti came to Parliament from a position as an executive member of the Mount Maunganui Watersiders' Union.

== Political career ==
New Zealand Parliament
Years	Term	Electorate	Party
1967–1969	35th	Eastern Maori	Labour
1969–1972	36th	Eastern Maori	Labour
1972–1975	37th	Eastern Maori	Labour
1975–1978	38th	Eastern Maori	Labour
1978–1981	39th	Eastern Maori	Labour

Reweti won the Eastern Maori electorate for Labour, in the 1967 by-election following the death of Puti Tipene Watene. He held the electorate until 1981, when he retired.

From 1973 to 1975, during the Third Labour Government, he was chairman of the parliamentary Māori Affairs Committee. In January 1976 he was appointed by Labour leader Bill Rowling as Shadow Minister of Marine.

In the 1990 Queen's Birthday Honours, Reweti was appointed a Companion of the Queen's Service Order for public services.

New Zealand Parliament
Preceded by Puti Tipene Watene	Member of Parliament for Eastern Maori; 1967–1981	Succeeded by Peter Tapsell
