= Ethel Pritchard =

New Zealand military and civilian nurse

- Born: 17 March 1880; Onehunga, Auckland, New Zealand
- Died: 19 July 1964 (aged 84); Gisborne, New Zealand
- Military career
- Allegiance: New Zealand
- Service number: WWI 22/47
- Unit: New Zealand Army Nursing Service
- Conflicts: First World War
- Awards: MBE

Ethel Pritchard MBE (née Watkins; 17 March 1880 – 19 July 1964), also known as Ethel Watkins Taylor, was a New Zealand military and civilian nurse.

== Biography ==
Pritchard was born on 17 March 1880 to mother Madeline Ratahi Cochrane and father Bazett Watkins in Onehunga, Auckland, New Zealand. She was Māori and identified with the Ngāpuhi iwi. Her great-grandfather was Frederick Edward Maning and great-grandmother was Moengaroa.

She was one of the few nurses of Māori descent that served in World War I and left New Zealand in 1915 with the first draft of 50 nurses. Ethel was stationed at the No. 15 General Hospital in Alexandria, Egypt. She served during World War I for a total of 4 years and 78 days.

On 5 July 1921, she married Albert Pritchard Puha at St. Augustine Church in Napier.

During her career, Pritchard was a native health nurse for the Te Karaka district, president of the Matawai-Mōtū branch of the RSA, foundation member of the Country Women's Institute of New Zealand, member of the Victoria League, the National Council of Women of New Zealand, the Women's Division Federated Farmers of New Zealand and the St John Ambulance Brigade.

In the 1949 King's Birthday Honours, Pritchard was appointed a Member of the Order of the British Empire for long services as a district nurse and an honorary child welfare officer.

She died on 19 July 1964 in Gisborne.
