= Arthur John Seamer =

Arthur John Seamer CMG (1878–1963) was a notable New Zealand Salvation Army missionary and Methodist minister. He was born in Tongala, Victoria, Australia, in 1878.

In the 1949 King's Birthday Honours, Seamer was appointed a Companion of the Order of St Michael and St George for services in connection with mission work among the Māori.

Arthur John Seamer died on 17 September 1963 in Hamilton, New Zealand, at 85. He was buried in Glen Eden, Auckland, New Zealand.
