= Turi Carroll =

New Zealand Māori leader and local politician

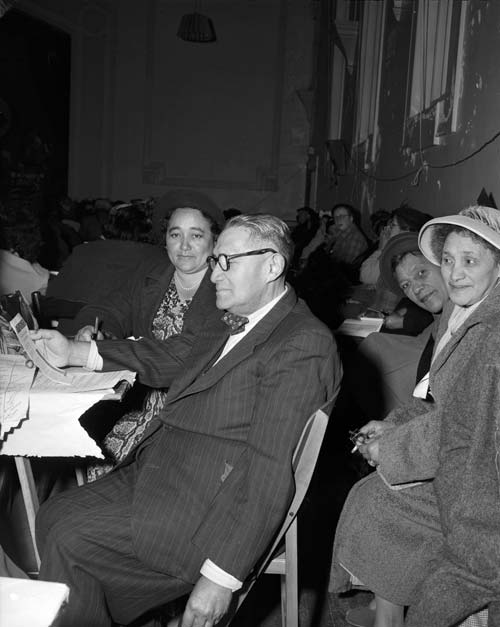
Carroll in 1953

Sir Alfred Thomas "Turi" Carroll KBE (24 August 1890 – 11 November 1975) was a New Zealand Māori leader and local politician. He was a member of the Kahungunu Tribal Executive, chair of the Wairoa County Council, and president of the New Zealand Māori Council from 1962 to 1967.

== Biography ==
Carroll was born in Wairoa, Hawke's Bay, New Zealand on 24 August 1890, to Thomas Carroll and his wife Mako Kaimoana. He was a member of the Ngāti Kahungunu tribe, and the family farm, the 2,200-acre (890 ha) Huramua station outside Wairoa, was inherited through his paternal grandmother, Tapuke, who was of high rank within the tribe.

Turi's uncle, James Carroll, seeing potential in him and seeking an heir to his own endeavours, decided that Turi should be sent away for education. He attended Wanganui Collegiate for a year in 1905, before moving to Te Aute College. He studied at Lincoln Agricultural College from 1909, graduated in 1911, and returned to manage the family farm.

Carroll served in the New Zealand Expeditionary Force in World War I from 1917 to 1919.

Carroll was a Rotarian and prominent in the Anglican Church, and was chairman of the Wairoa County Council.

Carroll was Maori vice-president of the National Party between 1948 and 1952, and unsuccessfully contested the Eastern Maori electorate for National in the 1949 and 1951 elections and the Southern Maori electorate for National in the 1954 election.

In the 1952 Queen's Birthday Honours, Carroll was appointed an Officer of the Order of the British Empire, for services to the Māori race. In 1953, he was awarded the Queen Elizabeth II Coronation Medal.

In the 1962 Queen's Birthday Honours, Carroll was promoted to Knight Commander of the Order of the British Empire, for services to the Māori people. The same month, June 1962, he was elected president of the New Zealand Māori Council of Tribal Executives (the council would become the New Zealand Māori Council the next year).

Carroll died on 11 November 1975 at Huramua station, near Wairoa. He was laid in state at the Taihoa marae before a funeral service at the Tākitimu marae. The procession of mourners following Carroll's hearse to his burial at the family cemetery was a mile long.
