= Ian Shirley =

New Zealand's first professor of public policy

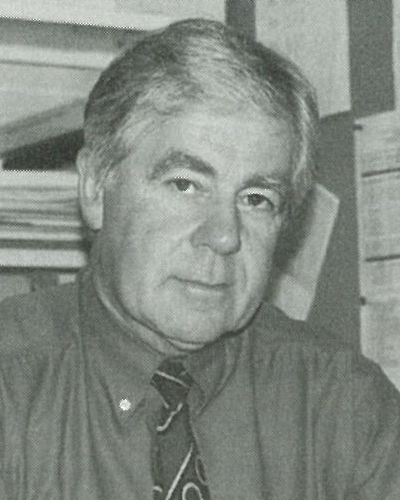
- Born: Ian Francis Shirley; 28 February 1940; Kaiapoi, New Zealand
- Died: 20 January 2019 (aged 78)

Academic work
- Discipline: Social policy
- Institutions: Massey University; Auckland University of Technology
- Doctoral students: Anne de Bruin

Ian Francis Shirley (28 February 1940 – 20 January 2019) was New Zealand's first professor of public policy and an advocate for social justice. He established the Institute of Public Policy at Auckland University of Technology.

== Academic career ==
Shirley was appointed as a lecturer in the Social Work Unit at Massey University in 1977, and promoted to senior lecturer in 1980. In 1982, he succeeded Merv Hancock as the director of the unit. In Shirley completed a PhD through Massey, on social practice within a capitalist state. He moved to the Auckland University of Technology in 2000, where he established the Institute of Public Policy, and also served as pro vice-chancellor. Shirley's notable students include Anne de Bruin.

== Social policy ==
Shirley advised on the Auckland super city.

== Later life and death ==
Shirley retired from Auckland University of Technology in 2016, and was accorded the title of professor emeritus. He died aged 78 on 20 January 2019.
