= Moana-Nui-a-Kiwa Ngarimu =

Recipient of the Victoria Cross

Moana-Nui-a-Kiwa Ngarimu VC
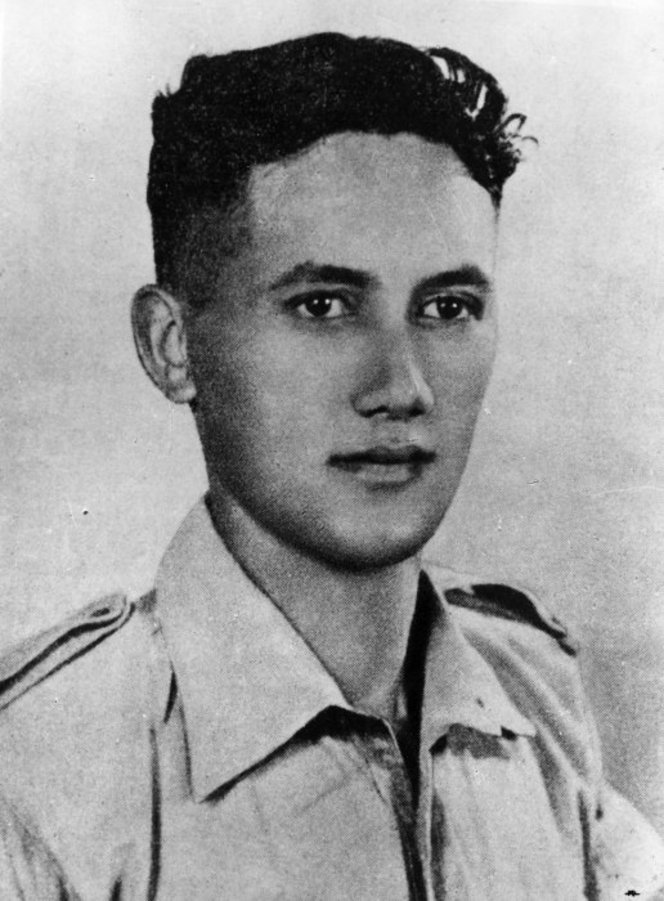
- Te Moananui-a-Kiwa Ngarimu, c1940
- Born: 7 April 1919; Whareponga, New Zealand
- Died: 27 March 1943 (aged 23); Mareth Line, Tebaga Gap, French Tunisia
- Burial place: Sfax War Cemetery
- Relatives: Materoa Reedy (aunt); Arnold Reedy (cousin)
- Military career
- Allegiance: New Zealand
- Branch: New Zealand Military Forces
- Service years: 1940-43
- Rank: Second Lieutenant
- Units: 28th (Māori) Battalion
- Conflicts: Second World War; Battle of Greece; Battle of Crete; North African Campaign; Tunisian campaign; Battle of the Mareth Line; Operation Supercharge II †
- Awards: Victoria Cross

Moana-Nui-a-Kiwa Ngarimu VC (7 April 1919 – 27 March 1943) was a soldier of the New Zealand Expeditionary Force and posthumous recipient of the Victoria Cross (VC), the highest award for gallantry in the face of the enemy that can be awarded to British and Commonwealth forces. He was the first Māori person to be awarded the VC while serving with New Zealand forces. He was killed in action during Operation Supercharge II, part of the Tunisian campaign of World War II.

== Early life ==
A Māori of Ngāti Porou and Te Whānau-ā-Apanui descent, Moana-Nui-a-Kiwa Ngārimu was born on 7 April 1919 in Whareponga in the East Coast region. He was one of ten children of Hāmuera Meketū Ngārimu, and his wife Maraea. The prominent tribal leader Materoa Reedy was his aunt. Arnold Reedy, a tribal leader and captain in the Māori Battalion in World War II, was Ngarimu's cousin and served alongside him in the war. Ngarimu was initially educated at Whareponga Native School but when the family moved to Pōhatukura, near Ruatoria, he attended Hiruhārama Native School. From 1933 to 1934, he went Te Aute College at Poukawa in Hawkes Bay, becoming well regarded at rugby. After completing his fourth form year, he worked as a shepherd on his father's sheep farm.

== Second World War ==
Following the outbreak of the Second World War, Ngarimu joined the 2nd New Zealand Expeditionary Force on 11 February 1940, volunteering for the 28th (Māori) Battalion. The battalion, which embarked in May 1940 as part of the second echelon of the 2nd New Zealand Division was destined for the Middle East to join the first echelon, but instead was diverted to England in May 1940 where it formed part of the island's defence against a possible German invasion. The battalion eventually arrived in Egypt in March 1941.

Ngarimu served through the battles of Greece and Crete after which he participated with the battalion during the North African Campaign. Commissioned in April 1942, he served for a time as an intelligence officer before being given command of his own platoon.

By March 1943, the campaign in Africa had moved to Tunisia. The 2nd Division, of which the Māori battalion was part, was tasked with the capture of the Tebaga Gap, which disrupted otherwise mountainous terrain. Several hills overlooked the gap, which itself was forced relatively easy, although several hills remained in German hands. One such hill was Point 209, held by the 2nd Battalion, 433 Panzer Grenadier Regiment of the 164th Light Division. Ngarimu's company was allocated the objective of the capture of Point 209. On the afternoon of 26 March, he led his men up the slope and captured what was believed to be the top of Point 209, although it transpired to be a false summit and a feature lower on the slopes of Point 209. Fierce fighting transpired as the Germans attempted to drive Ngarimu's forces off the hill. Twice wounded, he and his men defended their position from several counter-attacks during the night. His position reinforced the following morning, he was killed during the next counter-attack.

The false summit remained in the hands of Ngarimu's company, and the Germans still on Point 209 itself surrendered the same day once artillery support had been brought to bear on Point 209. Ngarimu is buried in Sfax War Cemetery, Tunisia.

=== Victoria Cross citation ===
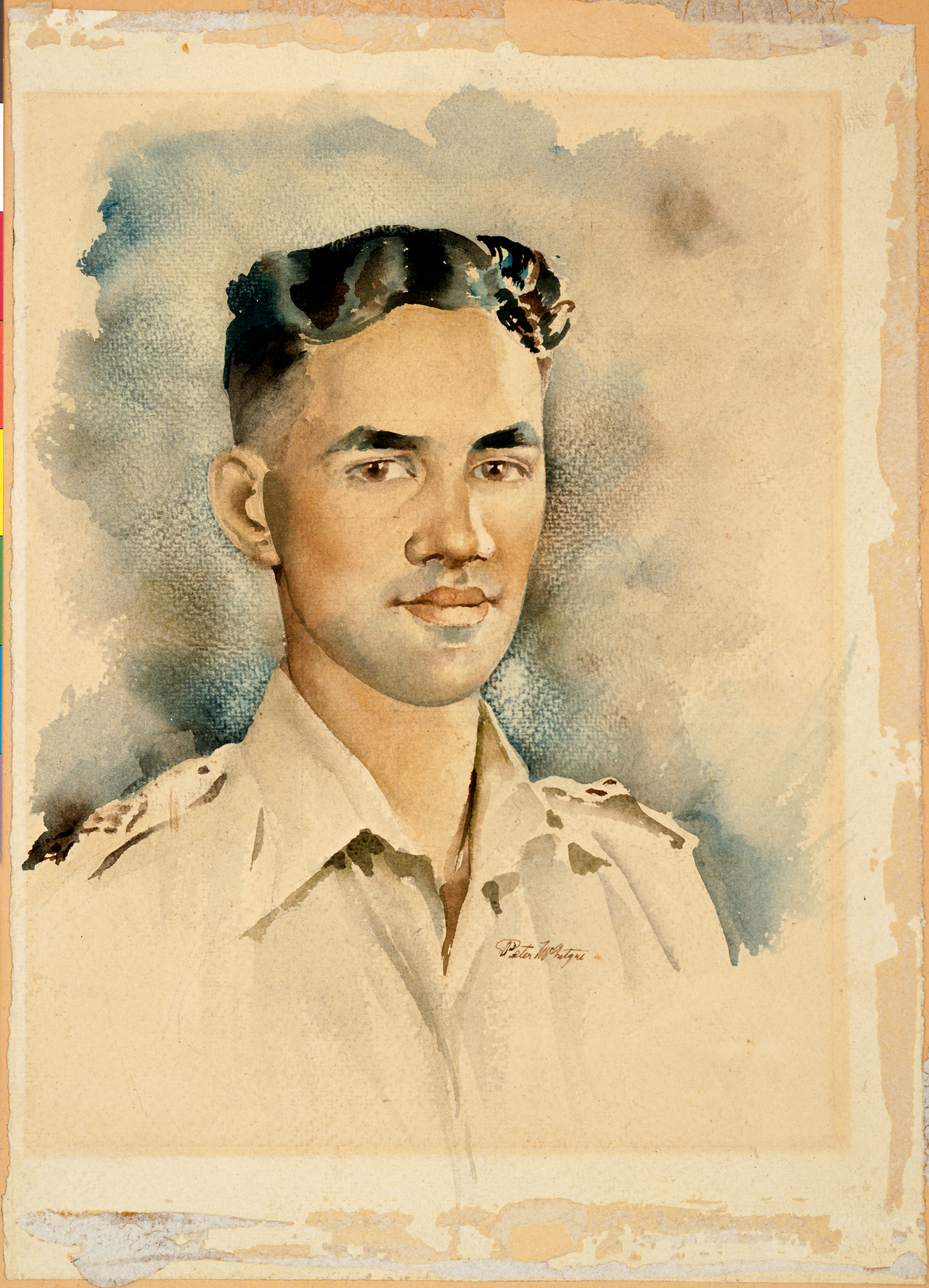
A portrait of Ngārimu by the official war artist for the 2NZEF, Peter McIntyre

The citation for Ngarimu's VC was published in the London Gazette and read:

'"The KING has been graciously pleased to approve the posthumous award of the Victoria Cross to Second-Lieutenant Moana-Nui-a-Kiwa Ngarimu.

"During the action at the Tebaga Gap on 26 March 1943, 2nd Lieutenant Ngarimu commanded a platoon in an attack upon the vital hill feature, Point 209. He was given the task of attacking and capturing an under-feature forward of Point 209 itself and held in considerable strength by the enemy. He led his men with great determination straight up the face of the hill, undeterred by the intense mortar and machine-gun fire, which caused considerable casualties. Displaying courage and leadership of the highest order, he was himself first on the hill crest, personally annihilating at least two enemy machine-gun posts. In the face of such a determined attack the remainder of the enemy fled, but further advance was impossible as the reverse slope was swept by machine-gun fire from Point 209 itself.

"Under cover of a most intense mortar barrage the enemy counter-attacked, and 2nd Lieutenant Ngarimu ordered his men to stand to and engage the enemy man for man. This they did with such good effect that the attackers were virtually mown down, 2nd Lieutenant Ngarimu personally killing several. He was twice wounded, once by rifle fire in the shoulder and later by shrapnel in the leg, and though urged by both his company and battalion commanders to go out, he refused to do so, saying that he would stay a little while with his men. He stayed until he met his death the following morning.

"Darkness found this officer and his depleted platoon lying on the rock face of the forward slope of the hill feature, with the enemy in a similar position on the reverse slope about twenty yards distant. Throughout the night the enemy repeatedly launched fierce attacks in an attempt to dislodge 2nd Lieutenant Ngarimu and his men, but each counter-attack was beaten off by 2nd Lieutenant Ngarimu's inspired leadership. During one of these counter-attacks the enemy, using hand grenades, succeeded in piercing a certain part of the line. Without hesitation this officer rushed to the threatened area, and those of the enemy he did not kill he drove back with stones and with his tommy-gun.

"During another determined counter-attack by the enemy, part of his line broke. Yelling orders and encouragement, he rallied his men and led them in a fierce onslaught back into their old positions. All through the night, between attacks, he and his men were heavily harassed by machine-gun and mortar fire, but 2nd Lieutenant Ngarimu watched his line very carefully, cheering his men on and inspiring them by his personal conduct. Morning found him still in possession of the hill feature but only he and two unwounded other ranks remained. Reinforcements were sent up to him. In the morning the enemy again counter-attacked and it was during this attack that 2nd Lieutenant Ngarimu was killed. He was killed on his feet defiantly facing the enemy with his tommy-gun at his hip. As he fell he came to rest almost on top of those of the enemy who had fallen, the number of whom survived testified to his outstanding courage and fortitude.

— London Gazette, No. 36040, 1 June 1943

== The medal ==
The medal was presented to his parents by the Governor General of New Zealand, Sir Cyril Newall, at a hui at Ruatoria on 6 October 1943 attended by government leaders, diplomatic representatives and local people. The first of only two Victoria Crosses awarded to Māori, it was displayed in Gisborne in the Tairawhiti Museum’s Price of Citizenship Gallery. He is commemorated by a scholarship promoting education of Māori, and also in the World War II Hall of Memories at the Auckland War Memorial Museum. There is also a plaque honouring him in Queen's Garden in Dunedin.
