= Koata =

Seats reserved for Māori in Parliament

Koata was the term for the four Māori electorates reserved for Māori in Parliament, used in 1928 by T W Ratana, who called himself Piri Wiri Tua or the campaigner. From the Māori language and literally meaning a quarter, the word is applied to each of the four New Zealand Māori seats and the Rātana movement Members of Parliament who held them.
