= International Small Business Journal =

- Discipline: Small Business and Entrepreneurship
- Language: English
- Edited by: Robert Blackburn

Publication details
- Former name: European Small Business Journal (until 1983, ISSN 0264-6560)
- History: 1982-present
- Publisher: SAGE Publications
- Frequency: Bimonthly
- Impact factor: 7.1 (2022)

Standard abbreviations
- ISO 4: Int. Small Bus. J.

Indexing
- ISSN: 0266-2426 (print); 1741-2870 (web)
- LCCN: 86015275
- OCLC no.: 67056182

Links
- Journal homepage; Online access; Online archive

The International Small Business Journal (ISBJ) is a peer-reviewed academic journal that covers the fields of economics and entrepreneurship, especially small businesses. The journal's editor-in-chief is Robert Blackburn (Kingston University). It was established in 1982 and is currently published by SAGE Publications. The ISBJ is a member of the Committee on Publication Ethics (COPE).

== About ==
The journal was founded in 1982, under the former name European Small Business Journal, but had been changed to the International Small Business Journal in 1983. It was founded and originally published by Clive Woodckck, a journalist for The Guardian. The papers published in the ISBJ are submitted by international academics (from a broad range of disciplines) covering theoretical, methodological and empirical studies of small firms. The ISBJ places emphasis on research excellence in the field of enquiry, to publish the highest quality original research papers, on small business and entrepreneurship. The ISBJ endeavours to provide a critical forum for world class contributions on the analysis of small firms as the articles in the ISBJ important to academics, policy makers, practitioners and analysts in government and organizations, seeking to understand small businesses, entrepreneurial processes and outcomes.

== Abstracting and indexing ==
The journal is abstracted and indexed in Current Contents, the Business Periodicals Index, the International Bibliography of the Social Sciences, Scopus, and the Social Sciences Citation Index. According to the Journal Citation Reports, its 2022 impact factor is 7.1, ranking it 43rd out of 154 journals in the category "Business" and 53rd out of 227 journals in the category "Management".

== Virtual Issues ==
The International Small Business Journal has brought together several collections of research, previously published in the journal, in 'virtual issues' centered on key themes in the field. Recent virtual issues include Female Entrepreneurship, which explores the journal's contribution to female entrepreneurship research and Remembering Jason Cope which celebrates the life, and academic legacy, of the late entrepreneurship scholar.

== Best Paper Award ==
In 2008 The International Small Business Journal founded the ISBJ Best Paper Prize, which is awarded annually to the authors of one paper, published in the journal, in the year of the award. The papers are assessed in terms of "focus [...]; theoretical positioning; methodological rigour; policy and or practitioner implications; and interest for future research activity". The ISBJ Best Paper Prize of is currently awarded to:

Alex Kevill, Kiran Trehan, Shelley Harrington and Selen Kars-Unluoglu (2021) for their paper on "Dynamic managerial capabilities in micro-enterprises: Stability, vulnerability and the role of managerial time allocation".

== Editors ==
- Editor-in-chief: Robert Blackburn
- Editors: Susan Marlow and Robert Wapshott
- Consulting Editors: Dirk De Clercq, Rachel Doern, Francis Greene, Robert T Hamilton, Liang Han, Dilani Jayawarna, Peter Jennings, Steffen Korsgaard, Tatiana Manolova, Alexander Newman, Niina Nummela, Dean Patton, Erno Tornikoski
- Review Editor: Jarna Heinonen
- Social Media Editor: Angela Martinez Dy, Lorna Treanor
