= Puti Tipene Watene =

New Zealand international rugby league footballer and politician

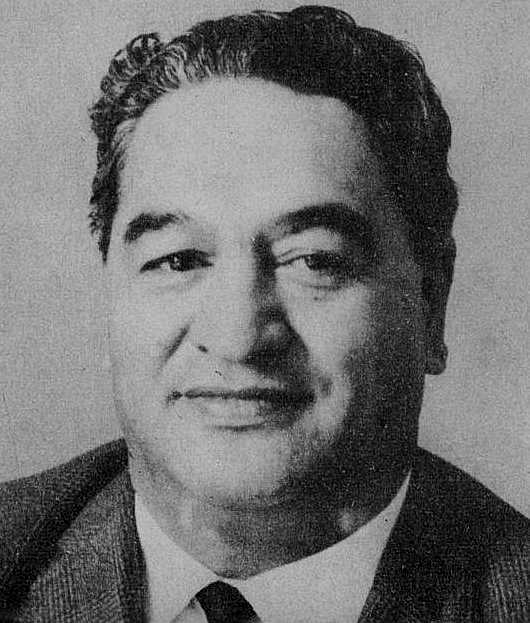

Member of the New Zealand Parliament for Eastern Maori
- In office 30 November 1963 – 14 June 1967
- Preceded by: Tiaki Omana
- Succeeded by: Paraone Reweti

Personal details
- Born: 18 August 1910 Kirikiri, Thames, New Zealand
- Died: 14 June 1967 (aged 56) Parliament Buildings, Wellington, New Zealand
- Party: Labour
- Spouse: Phyllis Watene
- Children: 12
- Rugby league career

Playing information
- Weight: 90 kg (14 st 2 lb)
- Position: Fullback, Wing, Stand-off, Loose forward
Club
Years	Team	Pld	T	G	FG	P
1929–35	City Rovers	83	14	118	0	278
1936–37	Manukau	30	10	30	0	90
1938	Newton Rangers	5	1	0	0	3
1939–43	Manukau	52	13	6	0	51
1943	Newton Rangers (preseason)	1	1	0	0	3
1943	→ City Rovers XIII (guest)	1	1	0	0	3
1945	City Rovers	1	0	0	0	0
1947	Manukau	2	2	1	0	8
	Total	175	42	155	0	436
Representative
Years	Team	Pld	T	G	FG	P
1929–37	Auckland	4	1	14	0	31
1930–37	New Zealand	14 (6)	4	11 (10)	0	34 (20)
1934–42	Auckland Māori (Tamaki)	16	12	16	0	68
1935	Auckland B	1	1	0	0	3
1935–36	Auckland A	2	0	0	0	0
1937	New Zealand Māori	1	0	0	0	0

Coaching information
Representative
Years	Team	Gms	W	D	L	W%
1944	Newton Rangers	23	3	0	20	13

Puti Tipene "Steve" Watene (18 August 1910 – 14 June 1967) was a New Zealand rugby league footballer and politician. He was the first Māori to captain the New Zealand league side and he is the only person to both represent the New Zealand national rugby league team and become a Member of Parliament.

== Early years and personal life ==
Watene was born in Thames in 1910. He attended Thames High School, Opotiki District High School and then the Māori Agriculture College in Hawkes Bay before he moved to Auckland where he worked as a labourer and a clerk.

He was a strong member of the Mormon faith, and a member of the Ngāti Maru and Te Arawa tribes. He is the great-grandfather of rugby league player Dallin Watene-Zelezniak.

== Rugby league ==
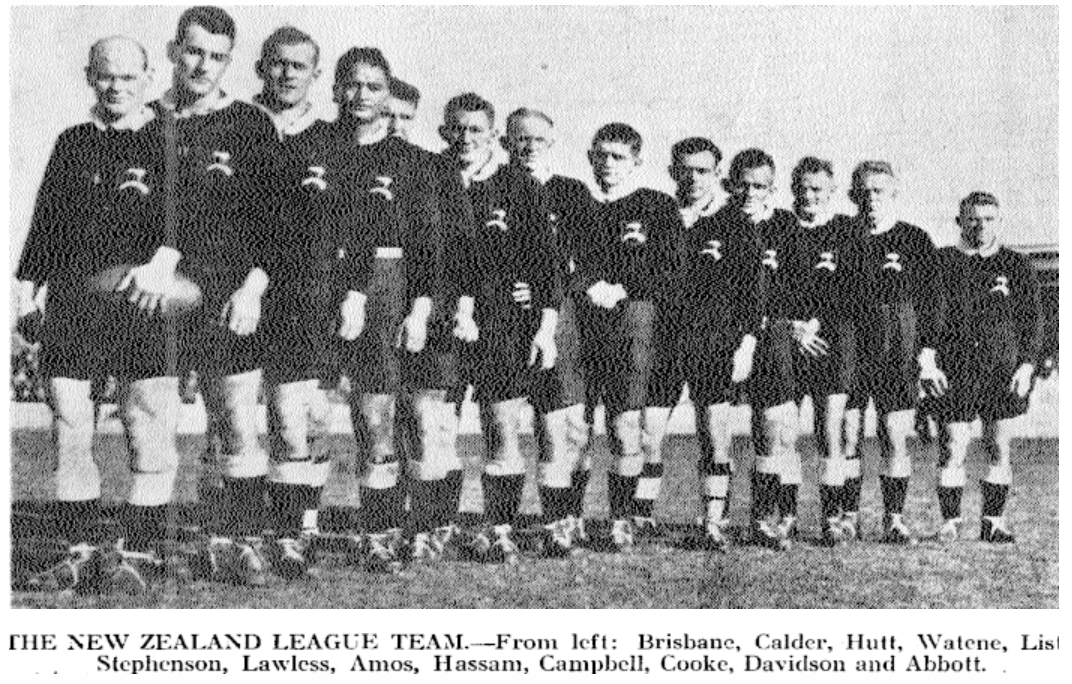

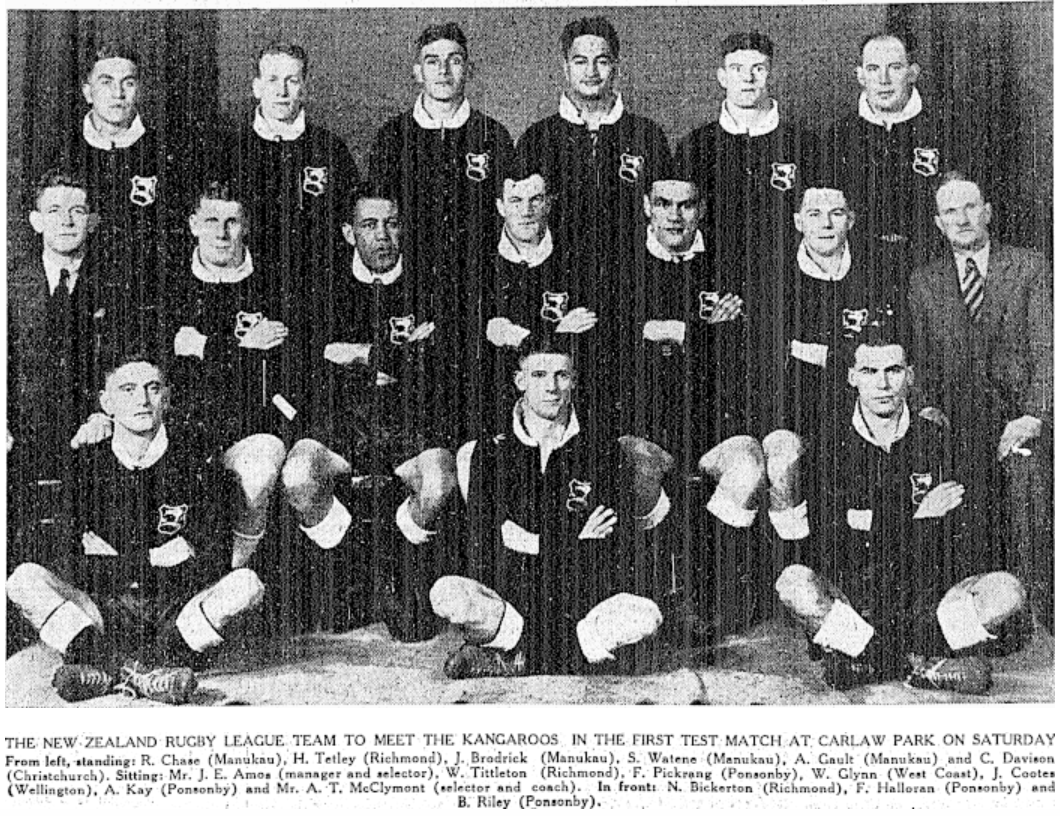

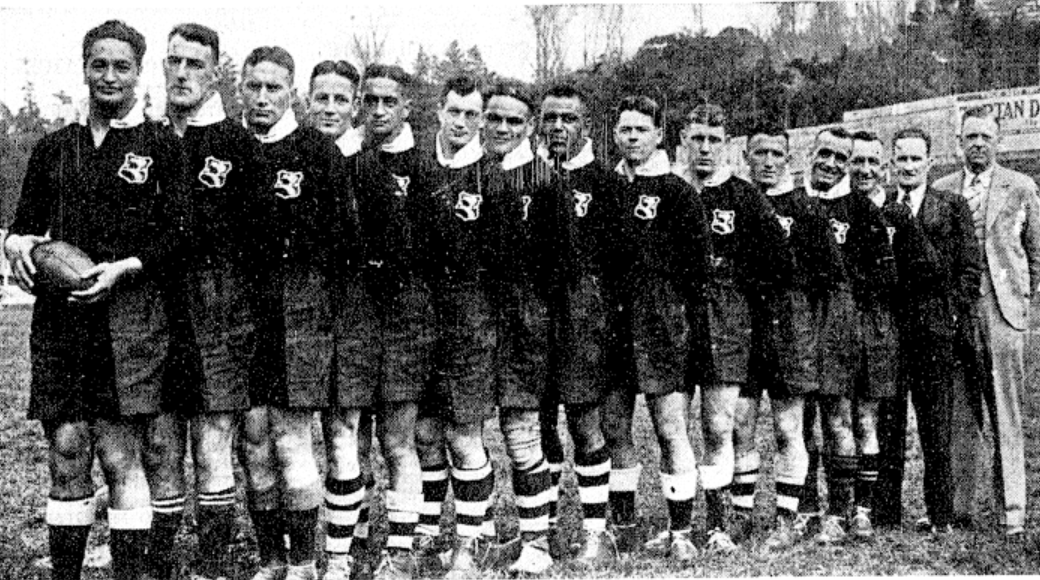

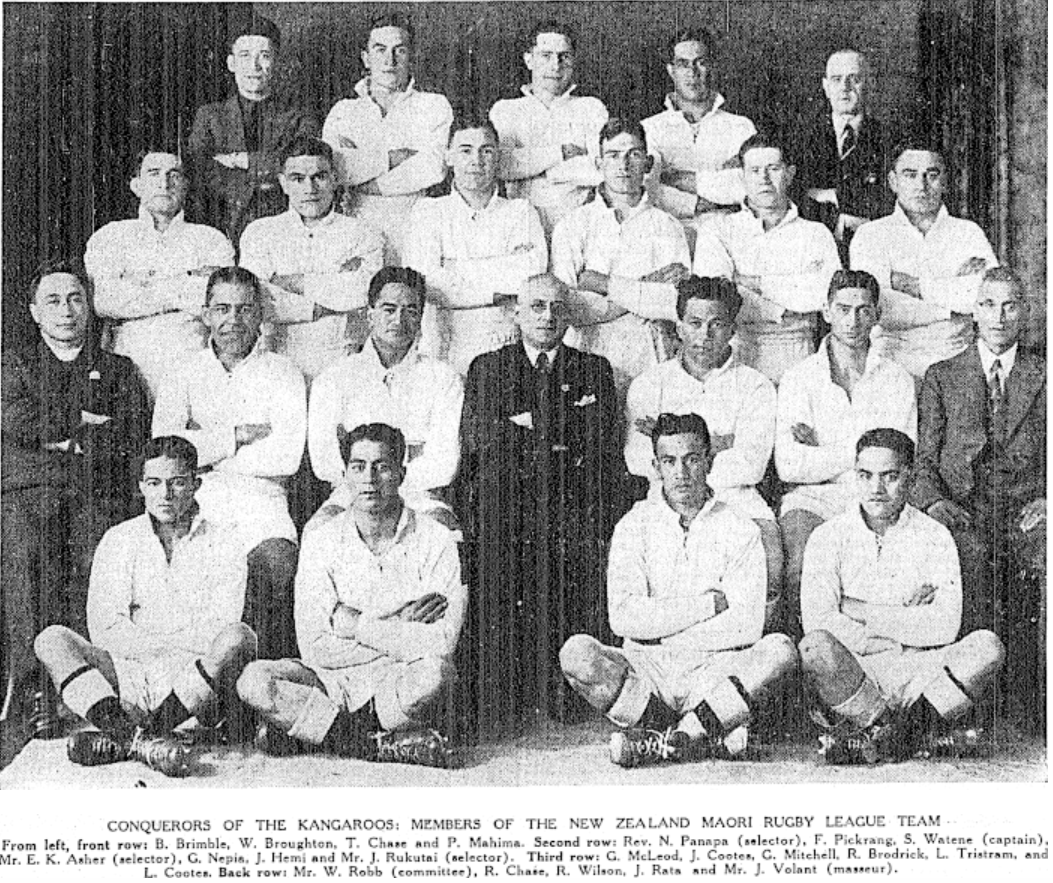

In Auckland Watene joined the City rugby league club in the Auckland Rugby League competition in 1929 after switching from the Manukau rugby club during the season and represented and captained Auckland. He debuted for Auckland in a 22–19 win over Northland at Carlaw Park. In the 1933 Auckland Rugby League season Watene top scored in the senior grade competitions with 77 points from 1 try, 26 conversions and 11 penalties. In 1936 Watene joined the newly re-formed Manukau side. He was the club's captain and played a major role in attracting many other Māori players to the club. As a result, Manukau quickly became a force in the Auckland competition, winning both the Fox Memorial and Roope Rooster in their debut year. He also played lock for the New Zealand Māori rugby league team, who secured a famous 16–5 victory over Australia in 1937 at Carlaw Park in front of 11,000 spectators.

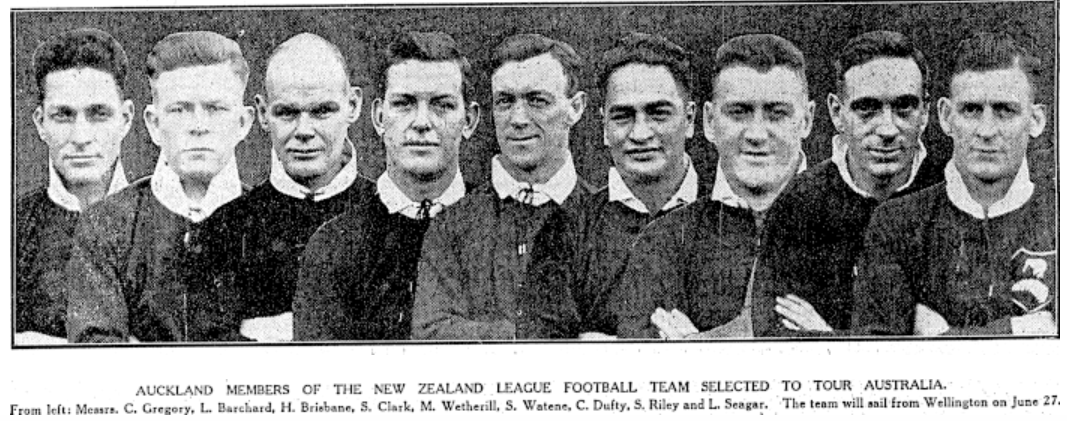

Watene was first selected for the New Zealand national rugby league team while only 19 in 1930 and played for them until 1937. Watene was part of the first ever Auckland Māori rugby league team which played 4 matches in 1934 of which he played in all of them. He played 2 further matches in 1935. He also captained the New Zealand national rugby league team in 1936 and 1937, becoming the first Māori to do so. In 1943 he played a preseason match for Newton Rangers before returning to his Manukau side which won the Fox Memorial, Rukutai Shield, Roope Rooster, and Stormont Shield. They were the first club to ever achieve this feat. During the season he also captained a City Rovers side which played Wellington Māori at Newtown Park in Wellington. The City side lost 31–13. The following season he became captain coach of the Newton Rangers before retiring from the game.

After retiring he remained involved in rugby league, coaching and selecting representative sides and working as an administrator. In 2008 he was named a New Zealand Rugby League Legend of League.

== Politics ==
Watene was politically active and during the 1951 waterfront dispute he toured the districts on behalf of the New Zealand Waterside Workers’ Union, urging Māori not to work as strike breakers.

In 1953 he was elected to the Mount Wellington Borough Council. He served until 1956, after which Mt Wellington named a street, Watene Road, after him.

He moved to Petone in 1956, working as a hostel manager and industrial welfare officer, and between 1962 and 1965 he served on the Petone Borough Council.

Watene also served on the New Zealand Māori Council.

=== Member of Parliament ===
New Zealand Parliament
Years	Term	Electorate	Party
1963–1966	34th	Eastern Maori	Labour
1966–1967	35th	Eastern Maori	Labour

A member of the New Zealand Labour Party, Watene had served on the national executive for six years before being elected as the Member of Parliament for Eastern Maori in November 1963, following the retirement of Rātana MP Tiaki Omana. As a Mormon, Watene's election broke the Rātana stranglehold on the Māori seats.

He was re-elected in 1966, but on 14 June 1967 suffered a heart attack and died in Parliament Buildings during a Maori Affairs Committee meeting.

== Legacy ==
In 1969, the Watene whānau donated the Steve Watene Trophy to the New Zealand Rugby League, who awarded the trophy annually to the best New Zealand rugby league player until 1992. Since 2012, the NZRL have presented the Steve Watene Medal to the Kiwi Player of the Year.

New Zealand Parliament
Preceded by Tiaki Omana	Member of Parliament for Eastern Maori; 1963–1967	Succeeded by Paraone Reweti
