= Leonard Delabere Bestall =

New Zealand architect, draper, museum director and benefactor

Leonard Delabere Bestall MBE (21 November 1895 – 22 March 1959) was a New Zealand architect, draper, museum director and benefactor. He was born in Wellington, New Zealand, on 21 November 1895.

In the 1949 King's Birthday Honours, Bestall was appointed a Member of the Order of the British Empire for services to art and music.
