= Arnold Reedy =

Ngati Porou leader, farmer, soldier (1903–1971)

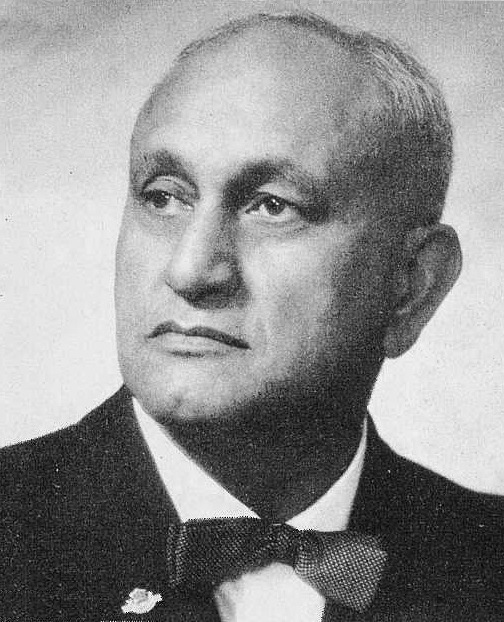
Reedy in 1963

Hānara Tangiāwhā Te Ōhakī "Arnold" Reedy OBE (16 August 1903 – 8 April 1971) was a New Zealand tribal leader, farmer and soldier. Of Māori descent, he identified with the Ngāti Porou iwi.

== Early life and family ==
He was born in Whareponga, East Coast, New Zealand, on 16 August 1903. He was the eldest son of Materoa Reedy, née Ngarimu, and John Marshall Reedy, himself the eldest son of Thomas Tyne Reedy, an Irishman, and Mihi Takawhenua Ngawiki Tuhou. Hekia Parata, a former member of Parliament, is his granddaughter.

Reedy was educated at Napier Boys' High School and Gisborne Boys' High School.

== Adult life ==
Reedy was a captain in the Māori Battalion in World War II, serving alongside his cousin Moana-Nui-a-Kiwa Ngarimu, and returned to farming after the war. In 1949 he was a Māori member of the New Zealand delegation to the United Nations. He was a foundation member of the New Zealand Maori Council for ten years, and was chairman of the Horouta Tribal Executive between 1956 and 1970.

Reedy contested the Eastern Māori seat several times; in 1957 and 1960 (when he came second) for Social Credit Party and in 1963, 1966 and the 1967 by-election for National Party.

== Honours and awards ==
In 1953, Reedy was awarded the Queen Elizabeth II Coronation Medal. He was appointed an Officer of the Order of the British Empire, for services to the Māori people, in the 1970 Queen's Birthday Honours.
