= Joint Information Environment =

The Joint Information Environment (JIE) is a single, joint, secure, reliable and agile command, control, communications and computing enterprise information environment to which the Department of Defense (DoD) is transitioning in a first-phase implementation that spans fiscal years 2013 and 2014.

The JIE will combine DoD’s many networks into a common and shared global network. It will provide email, Internet access, common software applications, and cloud computing. The main objectives are to increase operational efficiency, enhance network security and save money by reducing infrastructure and staffing.

According to the Defense Information Systems Agency (DISA), the JIE will encompass all DOD networks and will enhance network security by:

- Using a single-security architecture;
- Minimizing network hardware, software and staffing;
- Giving DOD users access to the network from anywhere in the world;
- Focusing on protecting data; and
- Improving DOD’s ability to share information among the services and with government agencies and industry partners.

In execution, there are three lines of operation: governance, operations, and technical synchronization. DISA has been given responsibility for the technical aspects of JIE and leads the JIE Technical Synchronization Office (JTSO), which includes agency staff, as well as representation from the military services, intelligence community, and National Guard.

The organization evolving the JIE includes the Joint Chiefs of Staff (JCS), Office of the Deputy Chief Management Officer (DCMO), DoD CIO, Joint Staff J6, United States Cyber Command, military services, intelligence community, and National Guard. The JCS chairman and each of the service chiefs have endorsed JIE as a military imperative. The Deputy Management Action Group, a part of DCMO that considers department-wide management and business issues, has endorsed the JIE’s viability to efficiently address budget issues, the threat vector, and the need to be dominant in the information operations.

The JIE will allow warfighters to work jointly and collaboratively in a secure information sharing environment. Its architecture provides a key benefit to connect military networks out to the very tactical edge, something current Defense Department systems cannot do. Another advantage is to break up current military unique service-oriented computing environments, allowing software based capabilities and tools to be deployed across the entire Defense Department enterprise.
