= Materoa Reedy =

Materoa Reedy (née Ngarimu, 1881–1944) was a New Zealand tribal leader.

Of Māori descent, she identified with the Ngāti Porou iwi. She was born in Maraeke, East Coast, New Zealand in 1881, the daughter of Tuta Ngarimu and Makere Rairi.

Reedy attended the Hukarere Native School for Girls. She married John Marshall Reedy, the eldest son of Thomas Tyne Reedy, an Irishman, and Mihi Takawhenua Ngawiki Tuhou. Their eldest son was Hanara (Arnold) Tangiawha Te Ohaki Reedy. Moana-Nui-a-Kiwa Ngarimu, the first Māori person to be awarded the Victoria Cross while serving with New Zealand forces, was her brother's son.
