= Journal of Interdisciplinary Economics =

- Discipline: Economics
- Language: English

Publication details
- History: 1985-present
- Publisher: SAGE Publishing
- Frequency: Quarterly

Standard abbreviations
- ISO 4: J. Interdiscip. Econ.

Indexing
- ISSN: 0260-1079 (print); 2321-5305 (web)

Links
- Journal homepage

The Journal of Interdisciplinary Economics is a peer-reviewed academic journal covering economics.

== Abstracting and indexing ==
The journal is abstracted and indexed in Scopus, Research Papers in Economics, and ProQuest databases.
