= 25th New Zealand Parliament =

Term of the Parliament of New Zealand

25th Parliament of New Zealand
←	24th Parliament	26th Parliament	→
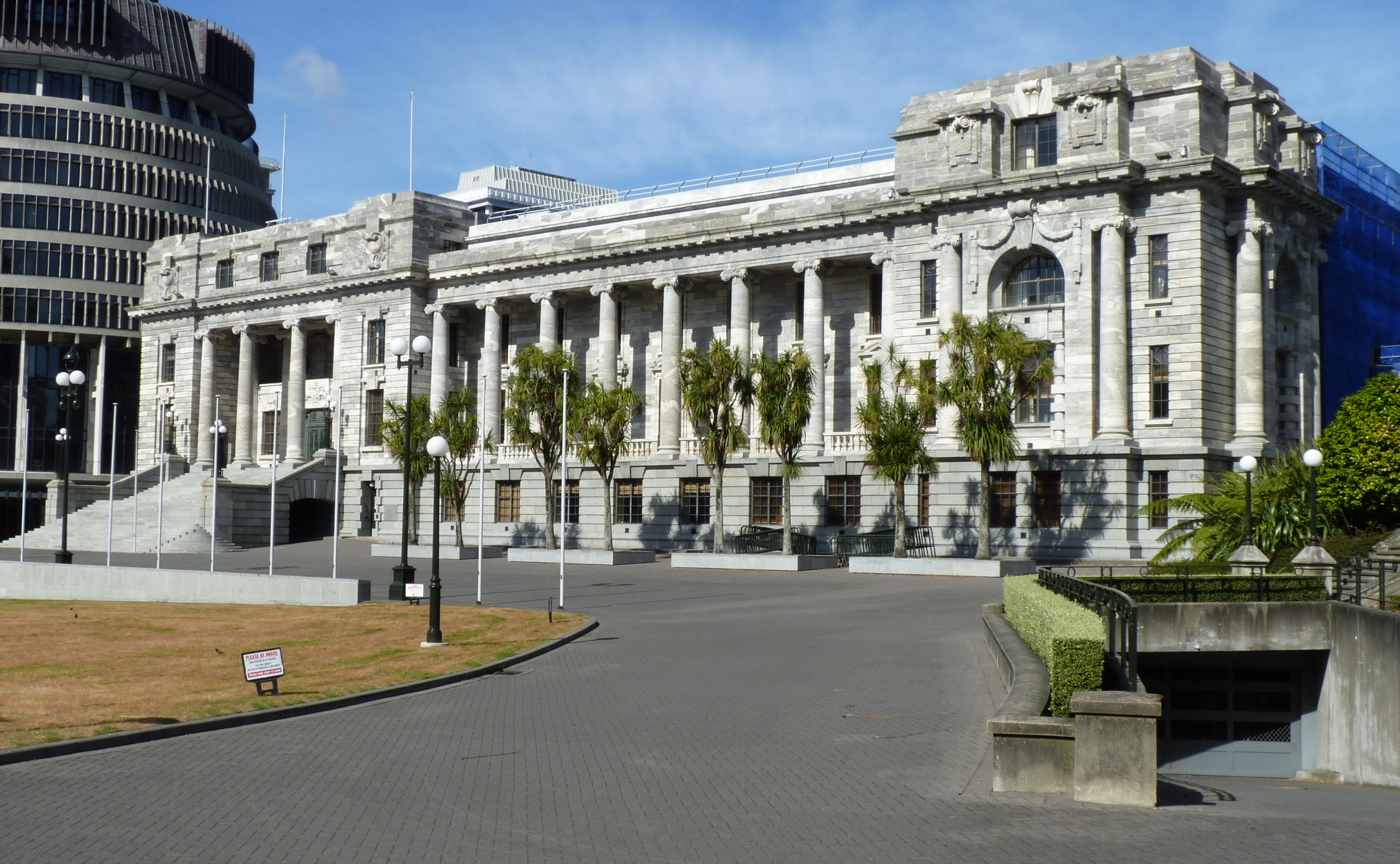
- Parliament House, Wellington

Overview
- Legislative body: New Zealand Parliament
- Term: 25 March 1936 – 26 August 1938
- Election: 1935 New Zealand general election
- Government: First Labour Government

House of Representatives
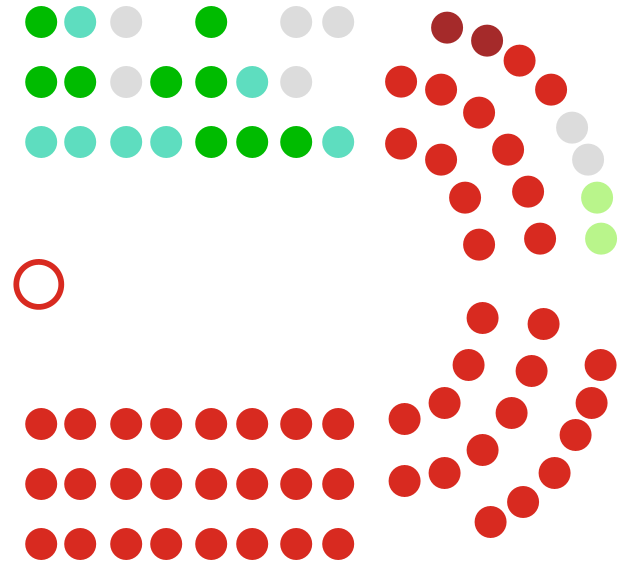
- Members: 80
- Speaker of the House: Bill Barnard
- Prime Minister: Michael Joseph Savage
- Leader of the Opposition: Adam Hamilton — George Forbes until 2 November 1936

Legislative Council
- Members: 39 (at start); 38 (at end)
- Speaker of the Council: Sir Walter Carncross
- Leader of the Council: Mark Fagan

Sovereign
- Monarch: HM George VI — HM Edward VIII until 11 December 1936
- Governor-General: HE Rt. Hon. The Viscount Galway

Sessions
- 1st: 25 March 1936 – 31 October 1936
- 2nd: 9 September 1937 – 15 March 1938
- 3rd: 28 June 1938 – 16 September 1938

The 25th New Zealand Parliament was a term of the New Zealand Parliament. It opened on 25 March 1936, following the 1935 election. It was dissolved on 16 September 1938 in preparation for the 1938 election.

The 25th Parliament was notable in that it was the first time the Labour Party had a parliamentary majority and formed a government, the First Labour Government. The new Prime Minister was Michael Joseph Savage. The opposition consisted of the United Party and the Reform Party, which merged to form the National Party in 1936.

The 25th Parliament consisted of eighty representatives, each elected from separate geographical electorates. As the 1935 elections had been a landslide victory for the Labour Party, the 25th Parliament was dominated by Labour MPs — 53 of the 80 were members of the Labour Party. The main opposition consisted of a coalition of the Reform Party, the United Party, and three independents, having a total of 19 MPs. Part way through the 25th Parliament, Reform and United took their coalition to the next step, and merged into a single group. This was called the National Party. The smaller Country Party and Rātana movement had two MPs each, and there were four independents not aligned with the coalition. The Democrat Party, despite winning a significant portion of the vote, did not hold any seats.

== Electoral boundaries ==
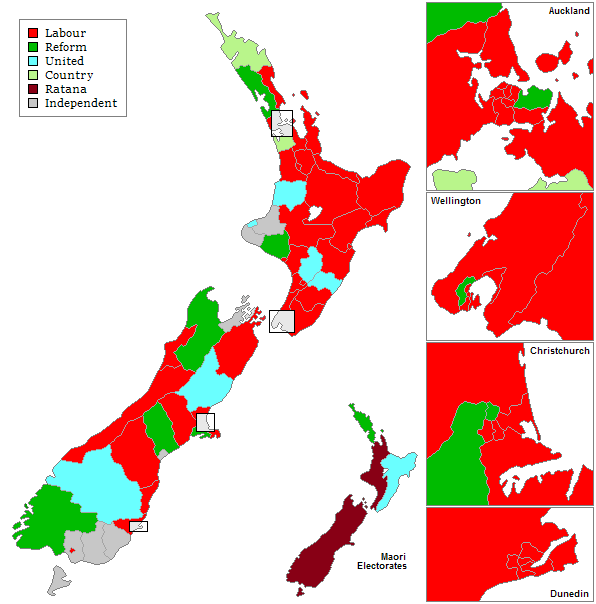

== Ministries ==
The 24th Parliament had been led by a coalition of the Reform Party and the United Party, formed in September 1931 during the term of the 23rd Parliament and led by George Forbes. The primary opposition had been the Labour Party.

At the 1935 election, the Labour Party obtained a parliamentary majority and formed a government, the First Labour Government. The leader of the Labour Party, Michael Joseph Savage, became Prime Minister. The opposition consisted of the United Party and the Reform Party, which merged in 1936 during the term of the 25th Parliament to form the National Party. The Savage Ministry was in power until Savage's death on 27 March 1940.

== Party standings ==
=== 1935-36 ===
Party	Leader(s)	Seats at start
Labour Party	Michael Joseph Savage	53
Reform Party	Gordon Coates	9
United Party	George Forbes	7
Country Party	Harold Rushworth	2
Ratana	Eruera Tirikatene	2
Independents		7

=== 1936-38 ===
Party	Leader(s)	Seats at start
Labour Party	Michael Joseph Savage	55
National Party	Adam Hamilton	19
Country Party	Harold Rushworth	2
Independents		4

== Members ==
=== Initial MPs ===
The following table shows the detailed results:

Key

Labour Independent United Reform United/Reform Democrat Ratana Country Party

Electorate results for the 1935 New Zealand general election
Electorate	Incumbent	Winner	Majority	Runner up
General electorates
Auckland Central	Bill Parry		5,301	Clifford Reid Dodd
Auckland East	Bill Schramm		2,337	Harold Percy Burton
Auckland Suburbs	Rex Mason		4,896	William Alexander Bishop
Auckland West	Michael Joseph Savage		6,180	Ernest David Stallworthy
Avon	Dan Sullivan		5,410	Lancelot Charles Walker
Awarua	Philip De La Perrelle	James Hargest (Note: James Hargest ran as an independent, but was aligned to the Reform Party)	950	Thomas Francis Doyle
Bay of Islands	Harold Rushworth		2,121	Clive Cameron
Bay of Plenty	vacant (Note: Kenneth Williams, the previous representative, died two days prior to the election)	Gordon Hultquist	555	John Tom Merry
Buller	Paddy Webb		4,499	John H Powell
Central Otago	William Bodkin		1,819	Herbert Kerr Edie
Chalmers	Alfred Ansell	Archie Campbell	1,071	Alfred Ansell
Christchurch East	Tim Armstrong		5,728	Sydney Richardson
Christchurch North	Henry Holland	Sidney Holland	971	Robert Macfarlane
Christchurch South	Ted Howard		5,585	Tom Milliken
Clutha	Peter McSkimming	James Roy (Note: James Roy ran as an independent, but was aligned to the United–Reform Coalition)	1,930	Rev. Edwin Thoms Cox
Dunedin Central	Charles Statham	Peter Neilson	1,729	Donald Cameron
Dunedin North	Jim Munro		1,668	Alexander Smith Falconer
Dunedin South	Fred Jones		3,378	Stuart Sidey
Dunedin West	William Downie Stewart	Gervan McMillan	945	William Downie Stewart
Eden	Arthur Stallworthy	Bill Anderton	2,465	Arthur Stallworthy
Egmont	Charles Wilkinson		3,172	James Ross
Franklin	Jack Massey	Arthur Sexton	685	Jack Massey
Gisborne	David Coleman		1,817	Douglas Lysnar
Grey Lynn	John A. Lee		8,012	George Wildish
Hamilton	Alexander Young	Charles Barrell	1,391	Alexander Young
Hauraki	Walter William Massey	Charles Robert Petrie	544	Walter William Massey
Hawke's Bay	Hugh Campbell	Ted Cullen	1,010	Hugh Campbell
Hurunui	George Forbes		1,203	Donald Cyrus Davie
Hutt	Walter Nash		7,757	Victor Emmanuel Jacobson
Invercargill	James Hargest	William Denham	346	Gordon Reed
Kaiapoi	Richard Hawke	Morgan Williams	1,424	Richard Hawke
Kaipara	Gordon Coates		302	William Grounds
Lyttelton	Terry McCombs		2,775	Seton Fulton Marshall
Manawatu	Joseph Linklater	Lorrie Hunter	60	Joseph Linklater
Manukau	Bill Jordan		6,402	Herbert Jenner Wily
Marsden	Alfred Murdoch	Jim Barclay	347	Alfred Murdoch
Masterton	George Sykes	John Robertson	325	George Sykes
Mataura	David McDougall		1,658	Thomas Golden
Mid-Canterbury	vacant (Note: Jeremiah Connolly, the previous representative, died just prior to the election)	Horace Herring	462	James Carr
Motueka	Keith Holyoake		280	Rubert York
Napier	Bill Barnard		4,057	Frank Bannerman Logan
Nelson	Harry Atmore		2,610	Herbert Everett
New Plymouth	Sydney George Smith		831	Fred Frost
Oamaru	Jack MacPherson	Arnold Nordmeyer	1,142	Jack MacPherson
Oroua	John Cobbe		2,333	William Henry Oliver (Note: Father of the historian W. H. Oliver)
Otaki	William Hughes Field	Leonard Lowry	1,720	G. A. Monk
Pahiatua	Alfred Ransom		1,175	R A Gower
Palmerston	Jimmy Nash	Joe Hodgens	115	Gus Mansford
Parnell	Bill Endean		731	Arthur Osborne
Patea	Harold Dickie		649	W G Simpson
Raglan	Lee Martin		1,695	Stewart Reid
Rangitikei	Alexander Stuart	Ormond Wilson	907	Alexander Stuart
Riccarton	Bert Kyle		1,139	G T Thurston
Roskill	Arthur Shapton Richards		4,023	Thomas James Fleming
Rotorua	Cecil Clinkard	Alexander Moncur	1,452	Frederick Doidge
Stratford	William Polson (Note: William Polson ran as an independent, but was aligned to the United–Reform Coalition)		339	Philip Skoglund
Tauranga	Charles Macmillan	Charles Burnett	41	Charles Macmillan
Temuka	Thomas Burnett		605	Thomas Herbert Langford
Thames	Albert Samuel	Jim Thorn	1,262	Albert Samuel
Timaru	Clyde Carr		1,059	W Thomas
Waimarino	Frank Langstone		1,863	Cecil Boles
Waipawa	Albert Jull	Max Christie	259	Albert Jull
Waikato	Frederick Lye	Robert Coulter	784	Frederick Lye
Wairarapa	Alex McLeod	Ben Roberts	33	John Wiltshire Card
Wairau	Edward Healy	Ted Meachen	352	Edward Healy
Waitaki	John Bitchener	David Barnes	479	John Bitchener
Waitemata	Alexander Harris	Jack Lyon	2,684	Alexander Harris
Waitomo	Walter Broadfoot		1,526	Jack Jones
Wallace	Adam Hamilton		2,034	Lawrence Edmond
Wanganui	Bill Veitch	Joe Cotterill	1,569	Bill Veitch
Wellington Central	Peter Fraser		4,479	Will Mason
Wellington East	Bob Semple		3,323	Ossie Mazengarb
Wellington North	Charles Chapman		794	Elizabeth Gilmer
Wellington South	Robert McKeen		6,059	Henry Featherston Toogood
Wellington Suburbs	Robert Wright		1,856	Peter Butler
Westland	James O'Brien		3,677	H R Young
Māori electorates
Eastern Maori	Āpirana Ngata		3,224	Tiaki Omana
Northern Maori	Taurekareka Hēnare		983	Paraire Karaka Paikea
Southern Maori	Eruera Tirikatene		43	Thomas Kaiporohu Bragg
Western Maori	Taite Te Tomo	Toko Ratana	47	Taite Te Tomo

Table footnotes:

=== By-elections during 25th Parliament ===
There was one by-election during the term of the 25th Parliament.

Electorate and by-election		Date	Incumbent	Cause	Winner
Manukau	1936	30 September	Bill Jordan	Appointed High Commissioner, UK	Arthur Osborne

=== Summary of changes ===
- Bill Jordan, the Labour MP for Manukau, resigned in 1936 to become the New Zealand High Commissioner to the United Kingdom. He was replaced by Arthur Osborne, also of the Labour Party.
- In 1936, the Reform Party and the United Party merged, becoming the National Party. The three independents who supported the Reform-United coalition (James Hargest, William Polson and James Roy) also joined the new group.
