= 26th New Zealand Parliament =

Term of the Parliament of New Zealand

26th Parliament of New Zealand
←	25th Parliament	27th Parliament	→
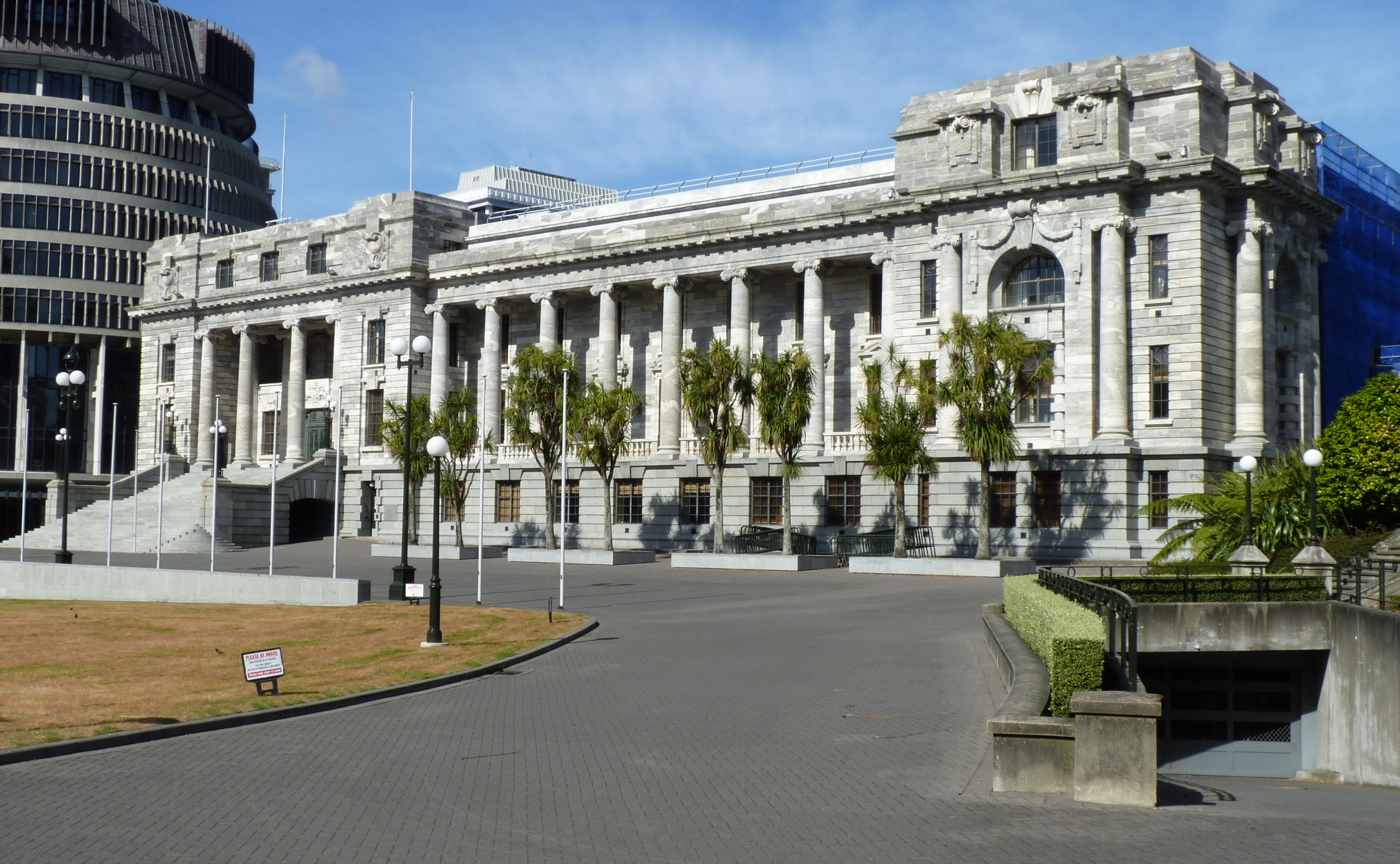
- Parliament House, Wellington

Overview
- Legislative body: New Zealand Parliament
- Term: 27 June 1939 – 26 August 1943
- Election: 1938 New Zealand general election
- Government: First Labour Government

House of Representatives
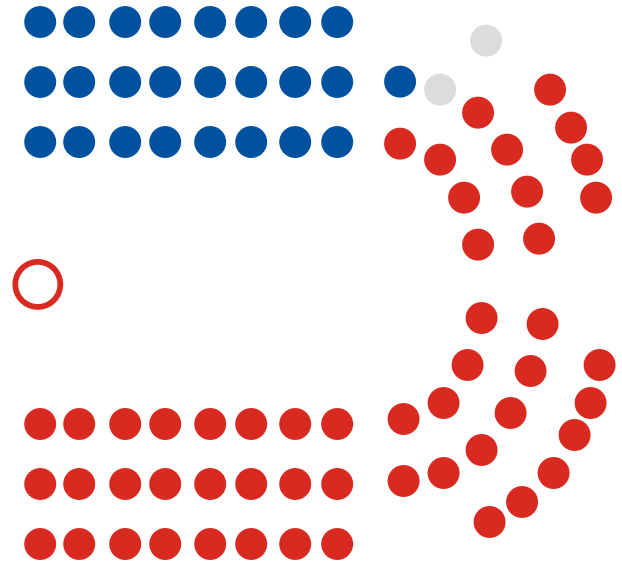
- Members: 80
- Speaker of the House: Bill Barnard
- Prime Minister: Peter Fraser from 1 April 1940 — Michael Joseph Savage until 27 March 1940 †
- Leader of the Opposition: Sidney Holland — Adam Hamilton until 26 November 1940

Legislative Council
- Speaker of the Council: Mark Fagan — Sir Walter Carncross until 18 July 1939
- Leader of the Council: David Wilson

Sovereign
- Members: 34 (at start); 36 (at end)
- Monarch: HM George VI
- Governor-General: HE Rt. Hon. Sir Cyrill Newall from 22 February 1941 — HE Rt. Hon. The Viscount Galway until 3 February 1941

Sessions
- 1st: 27 June 1939 – 6 October 1939
- 2nd: 30 May 1940 – 6 December 1940
- 3rd: 12 March 1941 – 17 October 1941
- 4th: 11 December 1941 – 12 December 1942
- 5th: 24 February 1943 – 26 August 1943

The 26th New Zealand Parliament was a term of the New Zealand Parliament. It was elected at the 1938 general election in October of that year.

== 1938 general election ==
The 1938 general election was held on Friday, 14 October in the Māori electorates and on Saturday, 15 October in the general electorates, respectively. A total of 80 MPs were elected; 48 represented North Island electorates, 28 represented South Island electorates, and the remaining four represented Māori electorates. 995,173 voters were enrolled and the official turnout at the election was 92.9%.

== Sessions ==
The 26th Parliament sat for an unusual five sessions by omitting the 1941 general election, and was prorogued on 30 August 1943. A 1941 act extended the life of parliament to 1 November 1942, and a 1942 act allowed extension to "one year from the termination of the present war", although a general election was held in 1943.

Session	Opened	Adjourned
first	27 June 1939	6 October 1939
second	30 May 1940	6 December 1940
third	12 March 1941	17 October 1941
fourth	11 December 1941	12 December 1942
fifth	24 February 1943	26 August 1943

== Ministries ==
The Labour Party had been in power since December 1935, and Michael Joseph Savage led the Savage Ministry. The opposition had consisted of the United Party and the Reform Party, which merged in 1936 during the term of the 25th Parliament to form the National Party. The First Labour Government was confirmed at the 1938 general election with an increased majority, and the Savage Ministry remained until Savage's death on 27 March 1940.

Savage was succeeded as prime minister by Peter Fraser, who formed the Fraser Ministry on 1 April 1940. The first Fraser Ministry resigned on 30 April 1940 and was reappointed, with some portfolios adjusted. The second Fraser Ministry remained in power until its defeat by the National Party at the 1949 election.

A War Cabinet was formed on 16 July 1940, which held the responsibility for all decisions relating to New Zealand's involvement in World War II. The War Cabinet was dissolved on 21 August 1945. For some months in 1942, a War Administration was in place. Formed on 30 June and dissolved on 2 October, the War Administration had responsibility for all war matters, with the War Cabinet as its executive body.

== Party standings ==
=== Start of Parliament ===
Party	Leader(s)	Seats at start
Labour Party	Michael Joseph Savage	53
National Party	Adam Hamilton	25
Independents		2

=== End of Parliament ===
Party	Leader(s)	Seats at start
Labour Party	Peter Fraser	50
National Party	Sidney Holland	25
Democratic Labour	John A. Lee	2
Independents		3

== Initial composition of the 26th Parliament ==
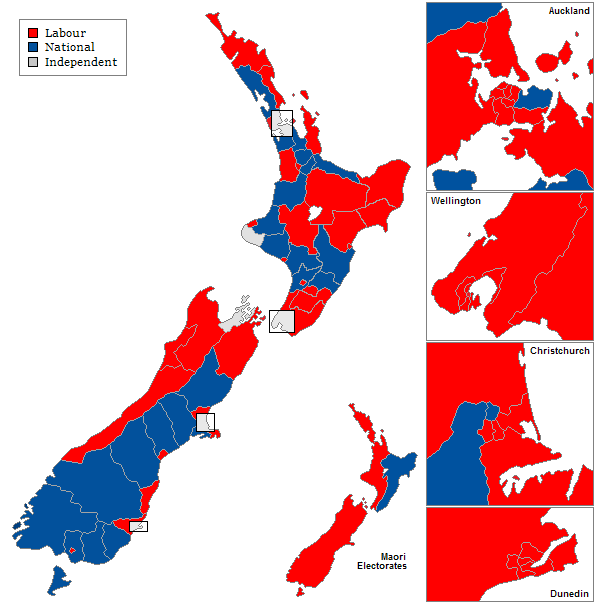

The following table shows the initial composition of the 26th Parliament:

The following table shows the detailed results:

Key

Labour National Country Party Independent Independent Liberal

Electorate results for the 1938 New Zealand general election
Electorate	Incumbent	Winner	Majority	Runner up
General electorates
Auckland Central	Bill Parry		6,181	Clifford Reid Dodd
Auckland East	Bill Schramm		2,626	Harry Tom Merritt
Auckland Suburbs	Rex Mason		4,862	Maxwell Stuart Walker
Auckland West	Michael Joseph Savage		8,007	John W. Kealy
Avon	Dan Sullivan		6,179	Hiram Hunter
Awarua	James Hargest		660	Joseph Albert Beck
Bay of Islands	Harold Rushworth	Charles Boswell	163	Harold Fisher Guy
Bay of Plenty	Gordon Hultquist		169	Bill Sullivan
Buller	Paddy Webb		6,144	Terry Maddison
Central Otago	William Bodkin		1,231	James McIndoe Mackay
Christchurch East	Tim Armstrong		7,179	Ken Armour
Christchurch North	Sidney Holland		492	Robert Macfarlane
Christchurch South	Ted Howard		5,995	Gladstone Ward
Clutha	James Roy		714	Herbert Kerr Edie
Dunedin Central	Peter Neilson		3,814	William John Meade
Dunedin North	Jim Munro		3,557	Alexander Smith Falconer
Dunedin South	Fred Jones		4,314	Rev. Ernest Aderman
Dunedin West	Dr Gervan McMillan		2,639	Stuart Sidey
Eden	Bill Anderton		2,333	Donald Pool
Egmont	Charles Wilkinson		1,402	Thomas Trask
Franklin	Arthur Sexton	Jack Massey	2,057	Ernest Piggott
Gisborne	David Coleman		3,640	Kenneth Jones
Grey Lynn	John A. Lee		8,607	Joseph Alexander Govan
Hamilton	Charles Barrell		1,860	Albert William Grant
Hauraki	Robert Coulter	John Manchester Allen	1,188	Robert Coulter
Hawkes Bay	Ted Cullen		2,658	George Maddison
Hurunui	George Forbes		535	Harold Denton
Hutt	Walter Nash		6,814	Jack Andrews
Invercargill	William Denham		2,156	Fred Hall-Jones
Kaiapoi	Morgan Williams		1,535	George Warren
Kaipara	Gordon Coates		1,689	Percy MacGregor Stewart
Lyttelton	Terry McCombs		2,984	Isaac Wilson
Manawatu	Lorrie Hunter	John Cobbe	1,644	Lorrie Hunter
Marlborough	New electorate	Ted Meachen	1,525	Edward Healy
Marsden	Jim Barclay		557	Alfred Murdoch
Masterton	John Robertson		190	Jack Irving
Mataura	David McDougall	Tom Macdonald	1,515	David McDougall
Mid-Canterbury	Horace Herring	Arthur Grigg	74	Horace Herring
Motueka	Keith Holyoake	Jerry Skinner	870	Keith Holyoake
Napier	Bill Barnard		3,937	John Ormond
Nelson	Harry Atmore		886	John Robert Kerr
New Plymouth	Sydney George Smith	Fred Frost	869	Sydney George Smith
Oamaru	Arnold Nordmeyer		758	Frank Cooney
Onehunga	New electorate	Arthur Osborne	4,314	John Park
Otahuhu	New electorate	Charles Robert Petrie	2,267	Kenneth Tennent
Otaki	Leonard Lowry		1,367	George Alexander Monk
Pahiatua	Alfred Ransom		931	George Anders Hansen
Palmerston North	Joe Hodgens		2,118	Jimmy Nash
Patea	Harold Dickie		809	Charles Joseph Duggan
Raglan	Lee Martin		604	Andy Sutherland
Rangitikei	Ormond Wilson	Edward Gordon	311	Ormond Wilson
Remuera	New electorate	Bill Endean	2,861	Mary Dreaver
Riccarton	Bert Kyle		87	Bert Langford
Roskill	Arthur Shapton Richards		2,141	Arthur Sagar Bailey
Rotorua	Alexander Moncur		1,648	Henry William Nixon
Stratford	William Polson		1,101	James Watson McMillan
Tauranga	Charles Burnett	Frederick Doidge	1,138	Charles Burnett
Temuka	Thomas Burnett		1,249	James Arnold Kearton
Thames	Jim Thorn		2,295	William Alexander Clark
Timaru	Clyde Carr		2,196	W H Hall
Waikato	Robert Coulter	Stan Goosman	2,928	J W Neate
Waimarino	Frank Langstone		2,940	Cecil Boles
Waipawa	Max Christie	Albert Jull	446	Max Christie
Wairarapa	Ben Roberts		777	James Frederick Thompson
Waitaki	David Barnes	David Campbell Kidd	14	David Barnes
Waitemata	Jack Lyon		2,261	John Ernest Close
Waitomo	Walter Broadfoot		329	Jack Jones
Wallace	Adam Hamilton		844	John James Lynch
Wanganui	Joe Cotterill		3,920	Henry Charles Veitch
Wellington Central	Peter Fraser		3,837	Will Appleton
Wellington East	Bob Semple		4,736	William Long Barker
Wellington North	Charles Chapman		3,278	Elizabeth Gilmer
Wellington South	Robert McKeen		6,415	David Howlett
Wellington Suburbs	Robert Wright	Harry Combs	3,163	Ossie Mazengarb
Wellington West	New electorate	Catherine Stewart	956	Robert Wright
Westland	James O'Brien		3,729	Ted Taylor
Māori electorates
Eastern Maori	Āpirana Ngata		1,064	Rēweti Kōhere
Northern Maori	Taurekareka Henare	Paraire Karaka Paikea	2,011	Taurekareka Henare
Southern Maori	Eruera Tirikatene		485	Thomas Kaiporohu Bragg
Western Maori	Toko Ratana		4,267	Pei Te Hurinui Jones

== Changes ==
There were a number of changes during the term of the 26th Parliament.

=== By-elections ===
Electorate and by-election		Date	Incumbent	Cause	Winner
Christchurch South	1939	3 June	Ted Howard	Death	Robert Macfarlane
Auckland West	1940	18 May	Michael Joseph Savage	Death	Peter Carr
Waipawa	1940	16 November	Albert Jull	Death	Cyril Harker
Waitemata	1941	19 July	Jack Lyon	Death	Mary Dreaver
Bay of Plenty	1941	13 December	Gordon Hultquist	Death	Bill Sullivan
Mid-Canterbury	1942	27 January	Arthur Grigg	Death	Mary Grigg
Hauraki	1942	7 February	John Allen	Death	Andy Sutherland
Temuka	1942	7 February	Thomas Burnett	Death	Jack Acland
Christchurch East	1943	6 February	Tim Armstrong	Death	Mabel Howard
Northern Maori	1943	19 June	Paraire Karaka Paikea	Death	(by-election postponed by legislation)

=== Party affiliation changes ===
Name	Year	Seat	From	To
John A. Lee	1940	Grey Lynn	Labour	Democratic Labour
Bill Barnard	1940	Napier	Labour	Democratic Labour
Gordon Coates	1942	Kaipara	National	Independent
Bert Kyle	1942	Riccarton	National	Independent

== Legislative Council ==
Composition of the Legislative Council at 23 June 1939:

Party	Seats at start
Labour Party	16
National Party	7
Independents or Unclear	8

List of members of the Legislative Council at 23 June 1939:

Name	Party	Start	End	Notes
John Alexander	National	22 June 1934	21 June 1941	Appointed by the United-Reform Coalition.
John Archer	Labour	22 September 1937	26 April 1949	
Tom Bloodworth	Labour	22 June 1934	31 December 1950	
Mark Briggs	Labour	9 March 1936	8 March 1950	
Tom Brindle	Labour	9 March 1936	8 March 1950	
Archibald Burns	National	22 June 1934	21 June 1941	Appointed by the United-Reform Coalition.
Walter Carncross	Unclear	18 March 1903	30 June 1940	Appointed as a Liberal. Late reappointed by the Reform Government in 1924, the United Government in 1931 and the First Labour Government in 1938.
Carey Carrington	National	17 June 1926	16 June 1940	Appointed by the Reform Government in 1926.
Michael Connelly	Labour	9 March 1936	8 March 1950	
James Cotter	Labour	9 March 1936	30 April 1947	
Eliot Davis	Unclear	22 June 1934	31 December 1950	Appointed by the United-Reform Coalition and reappointed by Labour.
Thomas Francis Doyle	Labour	9 March 1936	8 March 1950	
Mark Fagan	Labour	11 June 1930	31 December 1947	Appointed by the United Government in 1930. Reappointed by the United-Reform Government in 1935 and by Labour in 1944. Served as a Minister without portfolio in the first Labour Government. Also served as Speaker of the Legislative Council between 18 July 1939 to 31 December 1947.
James Goodall	Labour	9 March 1936	22 September 1942	
Josiah Hanan	National	17 June 1926	31 December 1950	Was a Liberal. Appointed by the Council in 1926 by the Reform Government. Reappointed by Labour in 1940 and 1947.
William Hayward	National	22 June 1934	21 June 1941	Appointed by the United-Reform Coalition
George Robert Hunter	Labour	9 March 1936	23 October 1949	
Bernard Martin	Labour	9 March 1936	8 March 1950	
William McIntyre	National	2 September 1921	26 October 1949	Appointed by Reform in 1921. Reappointed by Labour in 1942 and 1949.
James McLeod	Unclear	22 June 1934	31 March 1944	Appointed by the United-Reform Coalition and reappointed by Labour
Rangi Mawhete	Labour	9 March 1936	8 March 1950	
Tom O’Byrne	Labour	22 June 1934	31 December 1950	Appointed by the United-Reform Coalition. Reappointed by Labour in 1941 and 1948
Francis Edward O’Flynn	Labour	22 September 1937	19 June 1942	
William Perry	Unclear	22 June 2934	31 December 1950	Appointed by the United-Reform Coalition. Reappointed by Labour in 1941 and 1948
Heaton Rhodes	Unclear	22 June 1934	21 June 1941	Appointed by the United-Reform Coalition. Previously served as a member between 28 October 1925 - 27 October 1932
Benjamin Robbins	Labour	9 March 1936	8 March 1950	
Charles Statham	Independent	9 March 1936	5 March 1946	Former Reform MP for Dunedin Central. Did not take part in active politics while serving as a member of the Council
Jonathan Trevethick	Unclear	11 June 1930	17 October 1939	Appointed by the United Government in 1930. Reappointed by Labour in 1937.
Vincent Ward	Unclear	22 June 1934	9 February 1946	Appointed by the United-Reform Government in 1934. Reappointed by Labour in 1941.
Fred Waite	National	22 June 1934	31 December 1950	Former Reform MP for Clutha. Appointed by the United-Reform Coalition and reappointed by Labour twice.
David Wilson	Labour	22 September 1937	21 September 1944	Leader of the Council between 17 September 1939 and 26 September 1944. Served as a Minister of the Crown for: State Fire Insurance (1940-1944), Immigration (1940-1944), Broadcasting (1941-1944) and Civil Defence (1942-1944). Also served between 17 June 1947 and 31 December 1950.
