= 1942 Mid-Canterbury by-election =

New Zealand by-election

← 1938 general	27 January 1942	1943 general →
MP before election
Arthur Grigg
National
Elected MP
Mary Grigg
National

The 1942 Mid-Canterbury by-election was a by-election held on 27 January 1942 during the 26th New Zealand Parliament in the seat of Mid-Canterbury. The by-election resulted from the death of Arthur Grigg; his wife Mary Grigg was elected unopposed.

Arthur Grigg had held the seat since 1938 for the National Party. He was killed on 29 November 1941 while serving during World War II with the New Zealand Expeditionary Force (NZEF) in Libya. His wife was selected as the candidate for the National party, while Labour decided not to stand a candidate because of the war. Therefore, as no independent candidate stood (Mrs) Grigg was elected unopposed; from 21 January 1942 according to Wilson.

Wood notes that in the extreme case of Mid-Canterbury, 1942 the (unopposed) by-election was gazetted without date of election, and four different dates are available from reputable sources: Official Year-book, Parliamentary Record, Journals of the House and J Boston.

Grigg became the first female National Party MP and the fourth overall. She had little impact on parliament, retiring at the 1943 general election (30 August 1943) after marrying William Polson, the National MP for Stratford. Despite this her election is seen as a milestone in women's suffrage in New Zealand.

== Byelection date ==
In late November 1941 three MPs died (on 28, 29 and 30 November), two while on overseas military service. The date for the by-election(s) was a problem because of the post-Christmas break and because of the arrangements required for voting by servicemen overseas. Two by-elections were held on 7 February 1942 for Hauraki and Temuka where two independent candidates stood, but in Mid-Canterbury the widow of the sitting member was unopposed.

The date of the resultant by-elections had been discussed by Peter Fraser the Prime Minister and Minister in charge of the Electoral Department, the clerk of writs J. W. Heenan, and the speaker Bill Barnard. They were all National seats, and the Labour Party did not contest these wartime elections, but as independent candidates stood in two electorates, two by-elections were required. The speaker could not call them until the death was registered (which took longer for overseas deaths), and the Government Printing Office was closed for the Christmas-New Year holiday from 25 December to 7 January, so gazette notices could not be issued in that period.. The notification of vacancies by the speaker was on 6 December 1941. A full period of 17 days was required between nomination day and polling day; ten days was too short because of the requirement to record soldier’s votes from overseas. Heenan said that an election on Saturday 27 December was not possible although Saturday 31 January was; but Saturday 7 February 1942 was selected, with the last day for nominations 21 January and writs to be returned on 23 February. Warrants were issued on 13 January.
