= Mayor of Levin =

The mayor of Levin officiated over the Levin Borough of New Zealand. The borough was administered by the Levin Borough Council. The initial office existed from 1906 until 1989, when Levin Borough became Horowhenua District as part of the 1989 local government reforms. There have been 14 mayors of Levin. Horace Herring was previously a Labour MP for Mid-Canterbury from 1935–1938. The final Mayor to serve in Levin was Noel Horace Sciascia.

== List of mayors ==
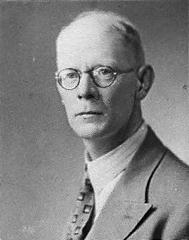
Horace Herring served mayor from 1953 to 1956

| | Name | Term |
|---|---|---|
| 1 | Basil R. Gardner | 1906–1915 |
| 2 | Charles Blenkhorn | 1915–1919 |
| 3 | D.W. Matheson | 1919–1923 |
| 4 | Thomas Hobson | 1923–1929 |
| (2) | Charles Blenkhorn | 1929–1932 |
| 5 | Phillip Wharton Goldsmith | 1932–1941 |
| 6 | H.E. Phillips | 1941–1945 |
| 7 | Hugh B. Burdekin | 1945–1950 |
| 8 | Alexander E. Parton | 1950–1953 |
| 9 | Horace Herring | 1953–1956 |
| 10 | Ernest Wallingford Wise | 1956–1965 |
| 11 | Claude E. Fuller | 1965–1971 |
| 12 | Laurie B. Roberts | 1971–1980 |
| 13 | Jack E. Bolderson | 1980–1986 |
| 14 | Noel Horace Sciascia | 1986–1989 |

== See also ==
- List of former territorial authorities in New Zealand
