= Nicola Grigg =

New Zealand politician

The Honourable Nicola Grigg MP
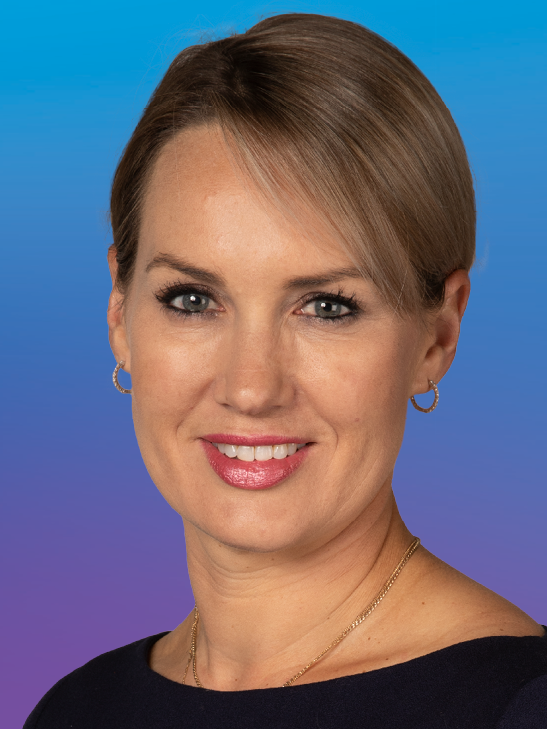
- Grigg in 2023

17th Minister for the Environment
- Incumbent
- Assumed office 7 April 2026
- Prime Minister: Christopher Luxon
- Preceded by: Penny Simmonds

17th Minister for Women
- Incumbent
- Assumed office 27 November 2023
- Prime Minister: Christopher Luxon
- Preceded by: Jan Tinetti

Minister of State for Trade and Investment
- Incumbent
- Assumed office 27 November 2023
- Prime Minister: Christopher Luxon
- Preceded by: Rino Tirikatene

Member of the New Zealand Parliament for Selwyn
- Incumbent
- Assumed office 17 October 2020
- Preceded by: Amy Adams
- Majority: 19,782

Personal details
- Born: 1979 or 1980 (age 46–47) Mount Somers, New Zealand
- Party: National
- Relations: Arthur Grigg (great-grandfather); Mary Grigg (great-grandmother); John Cracroft Wilson (Third great-grandfather)
- Website: Official website

Nicola Anna Grigg MP is a New Zealand politician and Member of Parliament in the House of Representatives representing the Selwyn electorate since October 2020, and has served as a Minister of the Crown since 27 November 2023. She is currently the Minister for the Environment, Minister of State for Trade and Investment, Minister for Women, and Associate Minister for ACC in the Sixth National Government. She is a member of the National Party.

== Early life ==
Grigg was born and raised in Mount Somers. Two of her great-grandparents were Members of Parliament for Mid-Canterbury between 1938 and 1943: Arthur Grigg and Mary Grigg (who was the first woman MP for the National Party, completing Arthur's term after his death). Grigg is also a third-great-granddaughter (through Mary Grigg) of John Cracroft Wilson, a British-educated civil servant in India, farmer and politician in New Zealand and Sir John Hall, an English-born New Zealand politician who served as the 12th premier of New Zealand from 1879 to 1882.

Grigg worked as a journalist for both Newstalk ZB and Radio New Zealand before shifting her career to politics. She worked for Bill English both during his tenure as finance minister and prime minister. She later worked for leader of the opposition Simon Bridges. She then left working at parliament and took up a position at New Zealand Trade and Enterprise.

== Political career ==
New Zealand Parliament
Years	Term	Electorate	List	Party
2020–2023	53rd	Selwyn	60	National
2023–2026	54th	Selwyn	19	National
2026–present	55th	Selwyn	16	National

=== First (2020–2023) ===
Grigg was selected as the National Party candidate for the Selwyn electorate in November 2019 on the first ballot, ahead of two other nominees: Simon Flood and Craig Watson.

In the 2020 general election, she was elected to the Selwyn seat with a final majority of 4,968 votes. Following the election, Grigg served as National's spokesperson for women and, from August 2021, trade and export growth.

On 19 January 2023, Grigg was also given the responsibility for Spokesperson for Rural Communities, Animal Welfare, Biosecurity, Food Safety and Associate Spokesperson for Agriculture. However, she lost the trade and export growth portfolio.

=== Second term (2023–2026) ===
At the 2023 New Zealand general election, Grigg retained the Selwyn electorate, beating Labour's Luke Jones by a margin of 19,782.

On 27 November 2023, she was appointed by the Governor-General, Dame Cindy Kiro at Government House to be the Associate Minister of Agriculture, Minister of State for Trade, and Minister for Women in the National-led coalition government.

In September 2024, Grigg represented New Zealand at the ASEAN Economic Ministers Meeting in Laos in her capacity as Minister of State for Trade. Grigg also represented New Zealand at the PACER Plus Ministerial Meeting in Brisbane in November 2024, and at the Pacific Island Forum Trade Ministers Meeting in Fiji in July 2025.

In late February 2025 she accompanied Prime Minister Christopher Luxon and a business delegation to Vietnam to promote bilateral economic and educational relations. Grigg also attended the East Asia Summit with Prime Minister Luxon in Malaysia in late October 2025.

As Minister for Women, Grigg launched a Gender Pay Gap toolkit to measure and address pay gaps, a Free to Lead toolkit to assist in tackling online harm, and a "BoardConnector" database to get more women into leadership and governance.

Following a cabinet reshuffle in early April 2026, Grigg was appointed as Minister for the Environment. On 14 May 2026, she introduced the Hazardous Substances and New Organisms Amendment Bill into Parliament.

=== Third term, 2026–present ===
During the 2026 New Zealand general election, Grigg contested the Selwyn electorate for National. She was ranked 16th on the National Party list. On 7 November, Grigg retained the Selwyn electorate by a landslide margin of 13,941 votes, based on preliminary votes.

== Personal life ==
Grigg previously dated former All Black captain Richie McCaw.

In October 2023, Grigg revealed at a National Party press conference in Rolleston that she was six-and-a-half months’ pregnant. She and her partner Phil have a son. Grigg resides in Prebbleton in the Selwyn District.

In mid-November 2026, Grigg took medical leave from her parliamentary duties following a cancer diagnosis.

== Views and position ==
Grigg has supported the establishment of safe zones around abortion providers and hospitals. While voting for the Contraception, Sterilisation, and Abortion (Safe Areas) Amendment Act 2022 during its first reading in Parliament, Grigg argued that establishing abortion safe zones would reduce "harassment, hate speech, and intimidation" by anti-abortion protesters against vulnerable women.

New Zealand Parliament
Preceded by Amy Adams	Member of Parliament for Selwyn; 2020–present	Incumbent
