= 1935 New Zealand general election =

- 26 (Māori) & 27 November (general) 1935

All 80 seats in the New Zealand Parliament 41 seats were needed for a majority
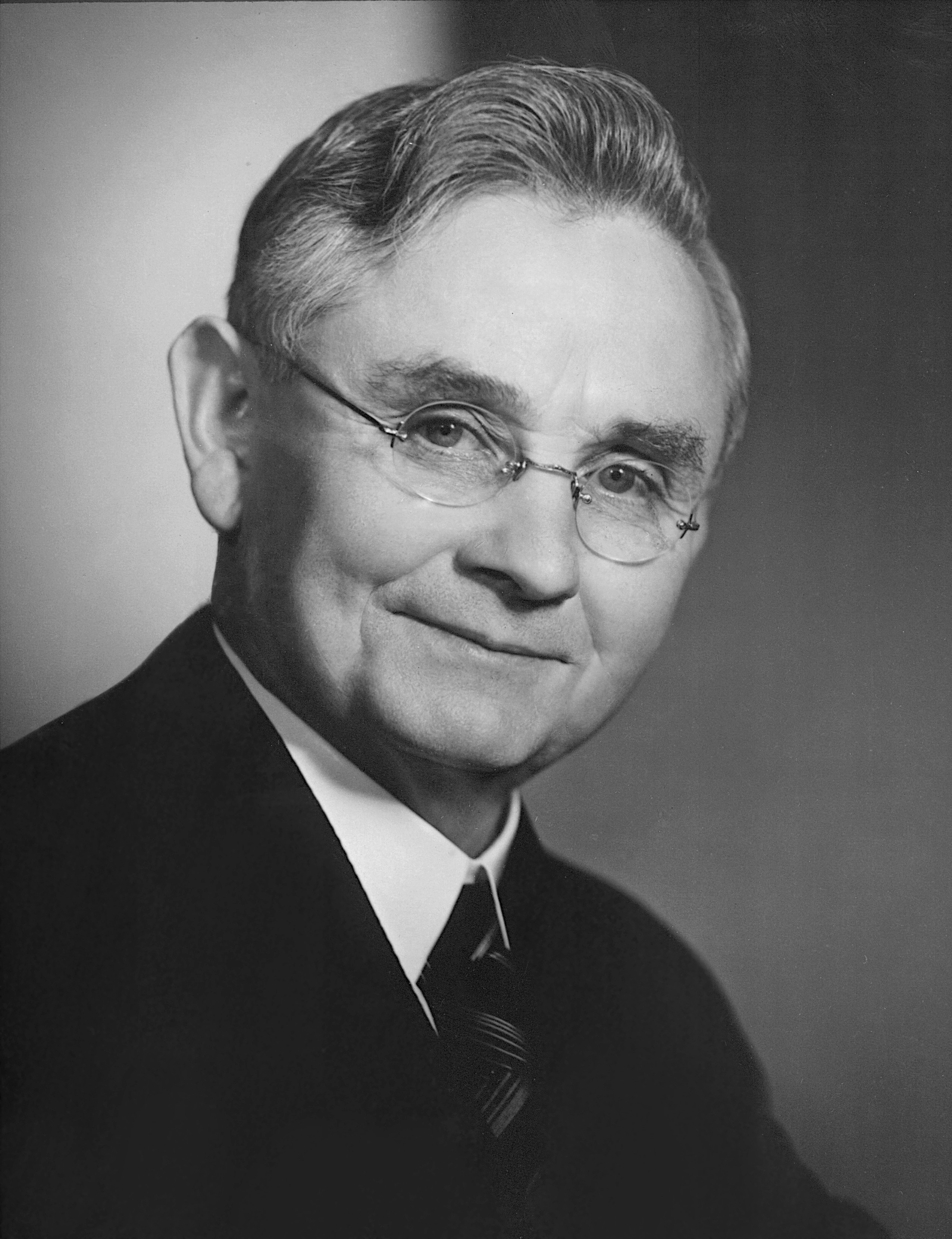

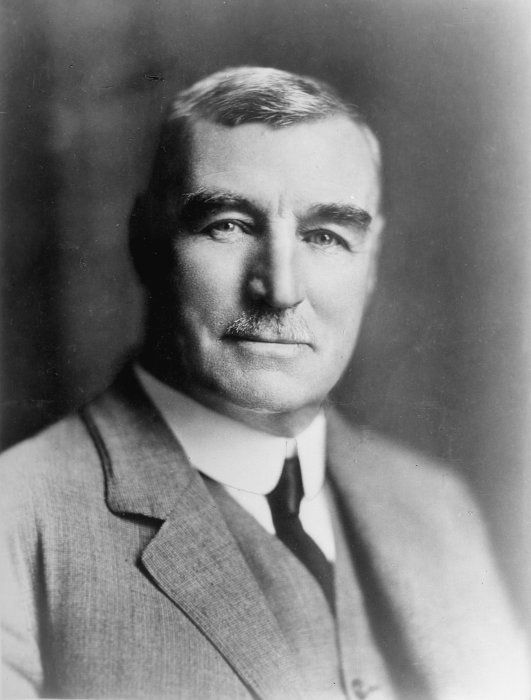

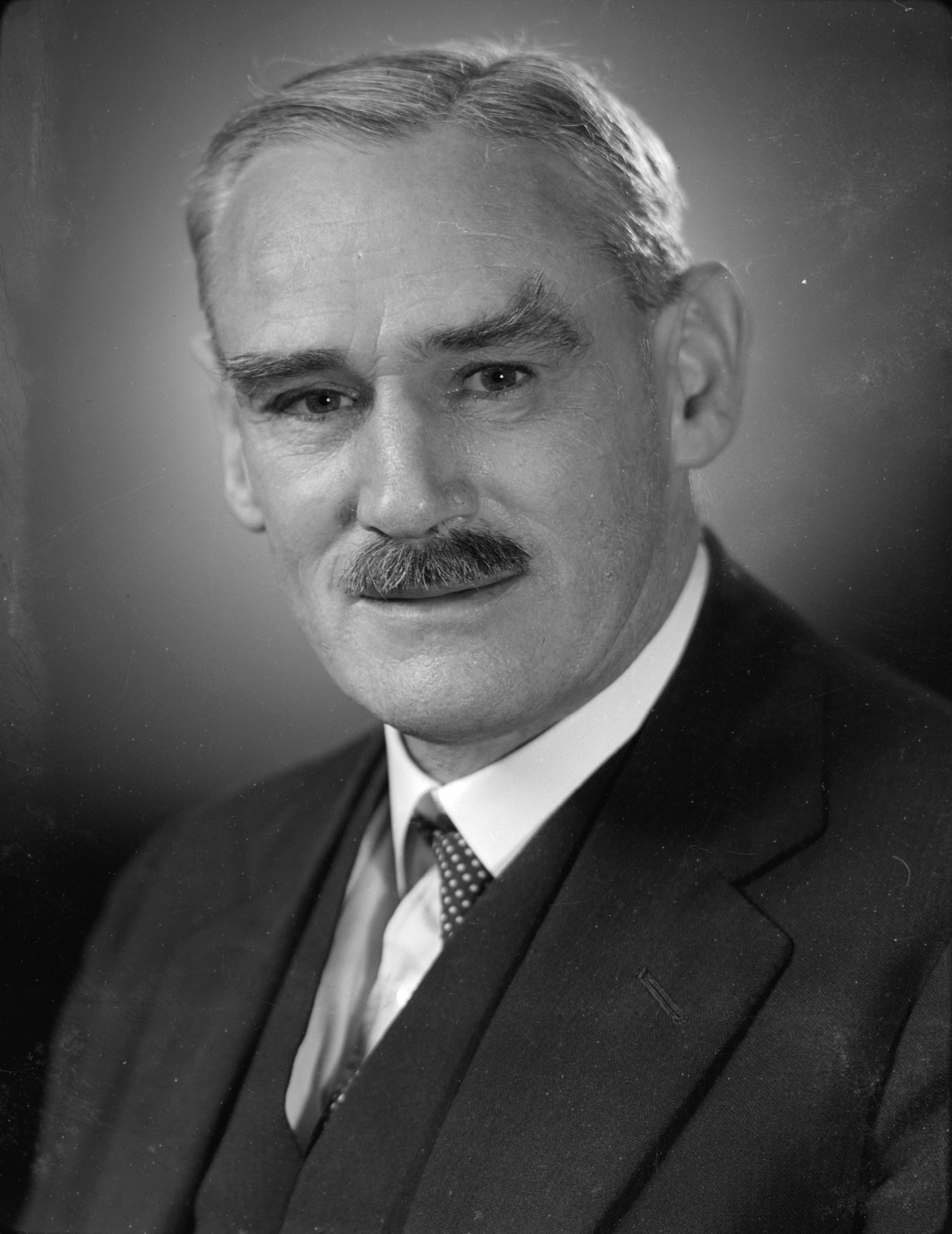

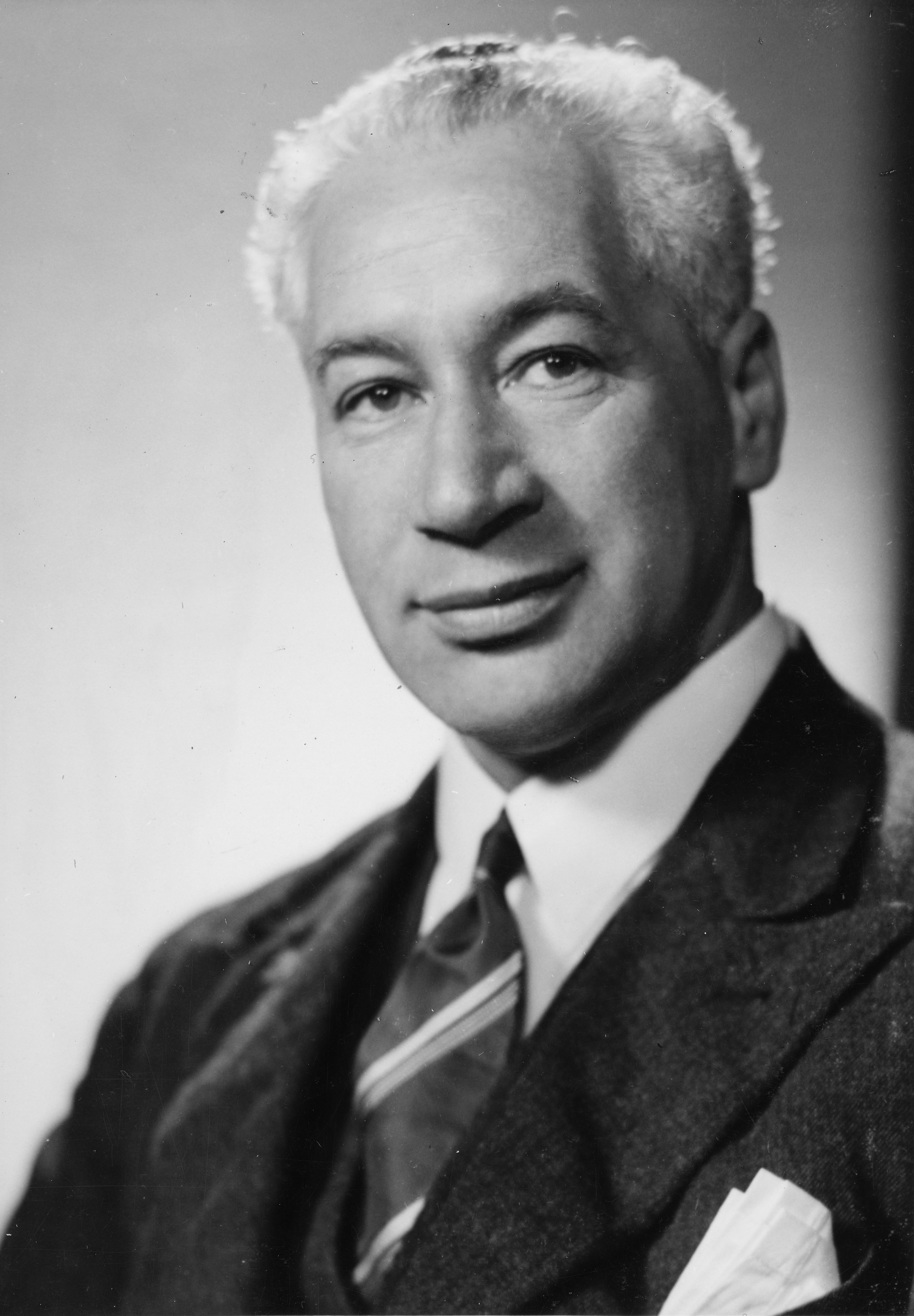
	First party	Second party
Leader	Michael Joseph Savage	George Forbes
Party	Labour	United/Reform
Leader since	12 October 1933	18 September 1931
Leader's seat	Auckland West	Hurunui
Last election	24 seats, 34.27%	47 seats, 54.03%
Seats after	53	16
Seat change	▲29	▼31
Popular vote	389,911	285,422
Percentage	45.73%	33.48%
Swing	▲11.46%	▼20.55%
	Third party	Fourth party
Leader	Harold Rushworth	Eruera Tirikatene
Party	Country Party	Ratana
Leader since	November 1928	3 August 1932
Leader's seat	Bay of Islands	Southern Maori
Last election	1 seat, 2.3%	0 seats, 1.00%
Seats after	2	2
Seat change	▲1	▲2
Popular vote	11,809	6,249
Percentage	1.67%	0.73%
Swing	▼0.67%	▼0.27%
- Results of the election.
Prime minister before election
George Forbes
United/Reform
Subsequent prime minister
Michael Joseph Savage
Labour

The 1935 New Zealand general election was a nationwide vote held on 26 and 27 November to determine the shape of the New Zealand Parliament's 25th term. It resulted in the Labour Party's first electoral victory, with Michael Joseph Savage becoming the first Labour prime minister after defeating the governing coalition, consisting of the United Party and the Reform Party, in a landslide—to date, the worst defeat of a sitting government in New Zealand history.

The governing coalition lost 31 seats, which was attributed by many to their handling of the Great Depression: the year after the election, the United and Reform parties merged to form the modern National Party.

The election was originally scheduled to be held in 1934, in keeping with the country's three-year election cycle, but the governing coalition postponed the election by one year hoping that economic conditions would improve by 1935. It remains New Zealand's only general election conducted on the basis of a four-year parliamentary term.

== Background ==
Since 1931, New Zealand had been governed by a coalition of the United Party and the Reform Party, the United–Reform Coalition. United and Reform had traditionally been enemies – United was a revival of the old Liberal Party, a progressive party with a strong urban base, while Reform was a conservative party with a strong rural base. When the 1928 elections left United and Reform with an equal number of seats, United managed to obtain support from the growing Labour Party, but in 1931, the worsening depression prompted a dispute over economic policy, and Labour withdrew its backing. Reform then agreed to go into coalition with United, fearing that an election would lead to significant gains for the "socialistic" Labour. The coalition held on to power in the 1931 elections, but the ongoing economic troubles made the government deeply unpopular, and by the time of the 1935 elections, Labour's support was soaring.

== Campaign ==
The Dominion, a Wellington newspaper, printed anti-Labour advertisements and editorials. On Sunday 24 November, shortly before the election, an address by Colin Scrimgeour ("Uncle Scrim") on the Friendly Road radio station, which was expected to urge listeners to vote Labour, was jammed by the Post Office.

== The election ==
The number of electorates being contested was 80, a number which had been fixed since the 1902 Electoral Redistribution.

Four of those were Māori electorates, and those elections were held on 26 November. 19 candidates contested the four available positions, and in three out of four cases, the incumbents were returned.

The election in the European electorates was held on the following day, a Wednesday. A total of 246 candidates contested the 76 European electorates, between two and six per electorate (Wellington East had six candidates, and there was a contest in all electorates), i.e. an average of 3.2 candidates per electorate. 919,798 people were registered to vote in European electorates (enrolment data for Māori electorates are only available since the 1954 election), and there was a turnout of 90.75%. This turnout was considerably higher than the turnout in the previous election (84.26%) and the highest turnout so far, but still about average for the next decades.

Elsie Andrews (1888–1948) was one of only three women who stood for election in this year.

== Results ==
=== Summary ===
The 1935 election saw a massive win for the opposition Labour Party, which won fifty-three seats, and formed the First Labour Government. The governing coalition won only nineteen, and three ministers were defeated (in Hamilton, Tauranga and Waitaki). This difference was not so great in the popular vote, however, with Labour winning 45.7% to the coalition's 33.5%. Labour was more fortunate than its British namesake in not attaining office before the depression (thanks to Seddon's lengthy reign) "and so could hold the conservative coalition responsible if natural laws of economics behaved unnaturally".

Apart from Labour and the coalition, the only two groups to win places in Parliament were the Country Party and the Ratana movement, both of which won two seats.

Four independents were elected, Harry Atmore, David McDougall, Charles Wilkinson and Robert Wright. The independents were tactically supported by one of the major parties who did not stand a candidate against them, and they generally voted with that party; Wilkinson and Wright supported the coalition while Atmore and McDougall supported Labour. Labour also did not stand candidates against the two Country Party members.

Many commentators blamed the coalition's failure to win seats on vote splitting by the Democrat Party, an "anti-socialist" group founded by a former organiser for the governing coalition, Albert Davy, and headed by Thomas Hislop, the Mayor of Wellington. Perhaps as many as eight seats were an unexpected bonus to Labour because of the three-way split. The Democrats won 7.8% of the vote, but no seats.

Two future National MPs stood unsuccessfully: Frederick Doidge stood as an independent for Rotorua and came second, and Matthew Oram stood for the Democrats in Manawatu and came fourth.

An analysis of men and women on the rolls against the votes recorded showed that in 1935 90.75% of those on the European rolls voted; men 92.02% and women 89.46%. In the 1938 election the figures were 92.85% with men 93.43% and women 92.27%. As the Māori electorates did not have electoral rolls they could not be included.

=== Party totals ===
Winning party by electorate.

Election results
Party	Candidates	Votes	Percentage	Seats	change
Labour	70	389,911	45.73	53	+29
Reform	74	285,422	33.48	9	−31
United	74	285,422	33.48	7	−31
Democrats	53	66,695	7.82	0	–
Country Party	6	11,809	1.67	2	+1
Ratana	4	6,249	0.73	2	+2
Communist	4	600	0.07	0	±0
Independents	60	87,748	10.29	7	−1
Total:	267	852,637	100	80	

=== Votes summary ===
Popular Vote
Labour	45.73%
United–Reform Coalition	33.48%
Democrats	7.82%
Country Party	1.67%
Ratana	0.73%
Independent	10.57%

Parliament seats
Labour	66.25%
United–Reform Coalition	23.75%
Country Party	2.50%
Ratana	2.50%
Independent	5.00%

=== Electorate results ===
The following table shows the detailed results:

Key

Labour Independent United Reform United/Reform Democrat Ratana Country Party

Electorate results for the 1935 New Zealand general election
Electorate	Incumbent	Winner	Majority	Runner up
General electorates
Auckland Central	Bill Parry		5,301	Clifford Reid Dodd
Auckland East	Bill Schramm		2,337	Harold Percy Burton
Auckland Suburbs	Rex Mason		4,896	William Alexander Bishop
Auckland West	Michael Joseph Savage		6,180	Ernest David Stallworthy
Avon	Dan Sullivan		5,410	Lancelot Charles Walker
Awarua	Philip De La Perrelle	James Hargest (Note: James Hargest ran as an independent, but was aligned to the Reform Party)	950	Thomas Francis Doyle
Bay of Islands	Harold Rushworth		2,121	Clive Cameron
Bay of Plenty	vacant (Note: Kenneth Williams, the previous representative, died two days prior to the election)	Gordon Hultquist	555	John Tom Merry
Buller	Paddy Webb		4,499	John H Powell
Central Otago	William Bodkin		1,819	Herbert Kerr Edie
Chalmers	Alfred Ansell	Archie Campbell	1,071	Alfred Ansell
Christchurch East	Tim Armstrong		5,728	Sydney Richardson
Christchurch North	Henry Holland	Sidney Holland	971	Robert Macfarlane
Christchurch South	Ted Howard		5,585	Tom Milliken
Clutha	Peter McSkimming	James Roy (Note: James Roy ran as an independent, but was aligned to the United–Reform Coalition)	1,930	Rev. Edwin Thoms Cox
Dunedin Central	Charles Statham	Peter Neilson	1,729	Donald Cameron
Dunedin North	Jim Munro		1,668	Alexander Smith Falconer
Dunedin South	Fred Jones		3,378	Stuart Sidey
Dunedin West	William Downie Stewart	Gervan McMillan	945	William Downie Stewart
Eden	Arthur Stallworthy	Bill Anderton	2,465	Arthur Stallworthy
Egmont	Charles Wilkinson		3,172	James Ross
Franklin	Jack Massey	Arthur Sexton	685	Jack Massey
Gisborne	David Coleman		1,817	Douglas Lysnar
Grey Lynn	John A. Lee		8,012	George Wildish
Hamilton	Alexander Young	Charles Barrell	1,391	Alexander Young
Hauraki	Walter William Massey	Charles Robert Petrie	544	Walter William Massey
Hawke's Bay	Hugh Campbell	Ted Cullen	1,010	Hugh Campbell
Hurunui	George Forbes		1,203	Donald Cyrus Davie
Hutt	Walter Nash		7,757	Victor Emmanuel Jacobson
Invercargill	James Hargest	William Denham	346	Gordon Reed
Kaiapoi	Richard Hawke	Morgan Williams	1,424	Richard Hawke
Kaipara	Gordon Coates		302	William Grounds
Lyttelton	Terry McCombs		2,775	Seton Fulton Marshall
Manawatu	Joseph Linklater	Lorrie Hunter	60	Joseph Linklater
Manukau	Bill Jordan		6,402	Herbert Jenner Wily
Marsden	Alfred Murdoch	Jim Barclay	347	Alfred Murdoch
Masterton	George Sykes	John Robertson	325	George Sykes
Mataura	David McDougall		1,658	Thomas Golden
Mid-Canterbury	vacant (Note: Jeremiah Connolly, the previous representative, died just prior to the election)	Horace Herring	462	James Carr
Motueka	Keith Holyoake		280	Rubert York
Napier	Bill Barnard		4,057	Frank Bannerman Logan
Nelson	Harry Atmore		2,610	Herbert Everett
New Plymouth	Sydney George Smith		831	Fred Frost
Oamaru	Jack MacPherson	Arnold Nordmeyer	1,142	Jack MacPherson
Oroua	John Cobbe		2,333	William Henry Oliver (Note: Father of the historian W. H. Oliver)
Otaki	William Hughes Field	Leonard Lowry	1,720	G. A. Monk
Pahiatua	Alfred Ransom		1,175	R A Gower
Palmerston	Jimmy Nash	Joe Hodgens	115	Gus Mansford
Parnell	Bill Endean		731	Arthur Osborne
Patea	Harold Dickie		649	W G Simpson
Raglan	Lee Martin		1,695	Stewart Reid
Rangitikei	Alexander Stuart	Ormond Wilson	907	Alexander Stuart
Riccarton	Bert Kyle		1,139	G T Thurston
Roskill	Arthur Shapton Richards		4,023	Thomas James Fleming
Rotorua	Cecil Clinkard	Alexander Moncur	1,452	Frederick Doidge
Stratford	William Polson (Note: William Polson ran as an independent, but was aligned to the United–Reform Coalition)		339	Philip Skoglund
Tauranga	Charles Macmillan	Charles Burnett	41	Charles Macmillan
Temuka	Thomas Burnett		605	Thomas Herbert Langford
Thames	Albert Samuel	Jim Thorn	1,262	Albert Samuel
Timaru	Clyde Carr		1,059	W Thomas
Waimarino	Frank Langstone		1,863	Cecil Boles
Waipawa	Albert Jull	Max Christie	259	Albert Jull
Waikato	Frederick Lye	Robert Coulter	784	Frederick Lye
Wairarapa	Alex McLeod	Ben Roberts	33	John Wiltshire Card
Wairau	Edward Healy	Ted Meachen	352	Edward Healy
Waitaki	John Bitchener	David Barnes	479	John Bitchener
Waitemata	Alexander Harris	Jack Lyon	2,684	Alexander Harris
Waitomo	Walter Broadfoot		1,526	Jack Jones
Wallace	Adam Hamilton		2,034	Lawrence Edmond
Wanganui	Bill Veitch	Joe Cotterill	1,569	Bill Veitch
Wellington Central	Peter Fraser		4,479	Will Mason
Wellington East	Bob Semple		3,323	Ossie Mazengarb
Wellington North	Charles Chapman		794	Elizabeth Gilmer
Wellington South	Robert McKeen		6,059	Henry Featherston Toogood
Wellington Suburbs	Robert Wright		1,856	Peter Butler
Westland	James O'Brien		3,677	H R Young
Māori electorates
Eastern Maori	Āpirana Ngata		3,224	Tiaki Omana
Northern Maori	Taurekareka Hēnare		983	Paraire Karaka Paikea
Southern Maori	Eruera Tirikatene		43	Thomas Kaiporohu Bragg
Western Maori	Taite Te Tomo	Toko Ratana	47	Taite Te Tomo

Table footnotes:

== Post-election events ==
A number of local by-elections were required due to the resignations of incumbent local body politicians following the general election:

- In February 1936 Dan Sullivan resigned as Mayor of Christchurch owing to a heavy workload after becoming a cabinet minister following Labour's victory. This sparked two by-elections, one for the mayoralty and another for three vacancies on the city council. Sullivan was replaced by John Beanland. Among the successful city council candidates was Robert Macfarlane who had contested Christchurch North in 1935.
- Likewise Peter Fraser resigned his seat on the Wellington City Council in order to focus on his new ministerial duties. A by-election was avoided however when Andrew Parlane, the highest polling unsuccessful candidate from the previous election, was the only nominated candidate.
- Later in the parliamentary term Fred Jones resigned his membership of the Dunedin City Council due to his ministerial obligations. An appointment was made instead of holding a by-election with Ralph Harrison succeeding Jones.
