= 1942 Temuka by-election =

New Zealand by-election

← 1938 general	7 February 1942	1943 general →
- Turnout: 5,658
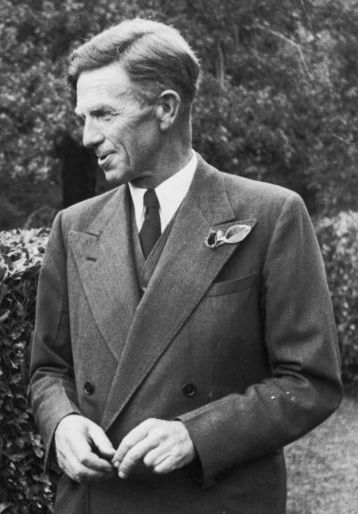

Candidate	Jack Acland	Donald Cyrus Davie
Party	National	Independent
Popular vote	4,142	1,516
Percentage	73.20	26.80
MP before election
Thomas David Burnett
National
Elected MP
Jack Acland
National

The 1942 Temuka by-election was a by-election for the electorate of Temuka held during the 26th New Zealand Parliament.

== Background ==
The by-election was held on 7 February 1942 after the death of Thomas David Burnett a National MP on 28 November 1942 during the parliamentary recess. A by-election was necessary although Labour did not stand a candidate as an independent candidate stood against the National candidate in this strongly National-held seat.

Donald Cyrus Davie stood as an independent candidate. He had previously contested Hurunui as a Labour candidate before resigning from the party over government taxation policies.

=== By-election date ===
In late November 1942 three MPs died (on 28, 29 and 30 November), two while on overseas military service. The date for the by-election(s) was a problem because of the post-Christmas break and because of the arrangements required for voting by servicemen overseas. Two by-elections were held on 7 February 1943 for Hauraki and Temuka where two independent candidates stood, but in Mid-Canterbury the widow of the sitting member was unopposed.

The date of the resultant by-elections had been discussed by Peter Fraser the Prime Minister and Minister in charge of the Electoral Department, the clerk of writs J. W. Heenan, and the speaker Bill Barnard. They were all National seats, and the Labour Party did not contest these wartime elections, but as independent candidates stood in two electorates, two by-elections were required. The speaker could not call them until the death was registered (which took longer for overseas deaths), and the Government Printing Office was closed for the Christmas-New Year holiday from 25 December to 7 January, so gazette notices could not be issued in that period. The notification of vacancies by the speaker was on 6 December 1941. A full period of 17 days was required between nomination day and polling day; ten days was too short because of the requirement to record soldier’s votes from overseas. Heenan said that an election on Saturday 27 December was not possible although Saturday 31 January was; but Saturday 7 February 1942 was selected, with the last day for nominations 21 January and writs to be returned on 23 February. Warrants were issued on 13 January.

== Results ==
The following table gives the election results:

1942 Temuka by-election
Party	Candidate	Votes	%	±%
National	Jack Acland	4,142	73.20	
Independent	Donald Cyrus Davie	1,516	26.80	
Majority		2,626	46.40	
Turnout		5,658		

The count with a total of 5,658 votes cast gave Acland 4,142 (and a majority of 2,626), Davie 1,516 with no informal votes. With the low turnout and the absence of either a Labour or Democratic Labour candidate, the result is not significant.
