= 1942 Hauraki by-election =

New Zealand by-election

| ← 1938 general | 7 February 1942 | 1943 general → |
- Turnout: 4,916
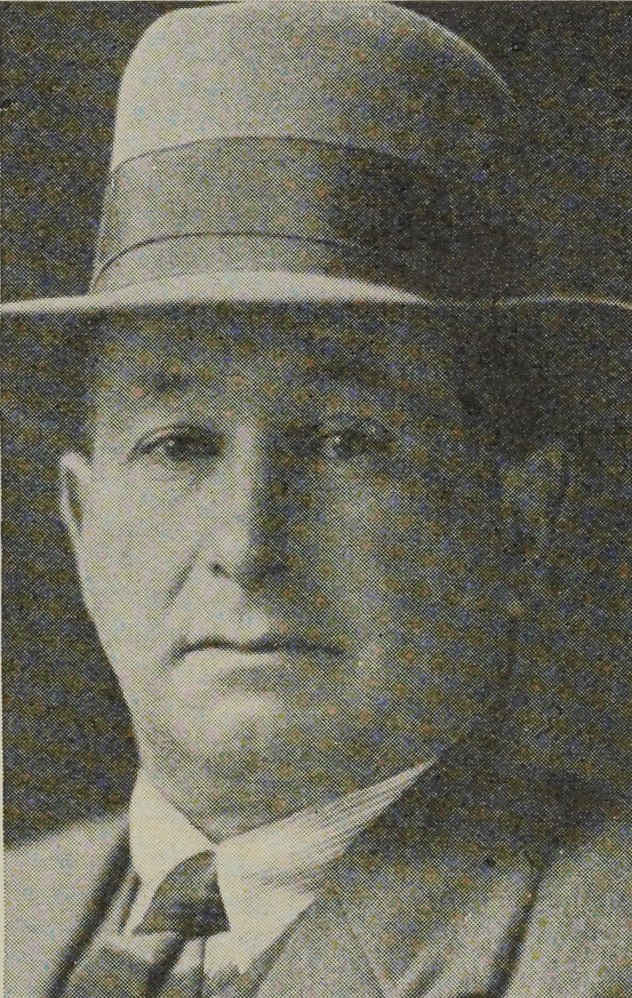

| Candidate | Andy Sutherland | Henry Thomas Head |
| Party | National | Independent |
| Popular vote | 3,805 | 1,082 |
| Percentage | 77.41 | 22.01 |
MP before election
John Allen
National
Elected MP
Andy Sutherland
National

The 1942 Hauraki by-election was a by-election for the electorate of Hauraki held during the 26th New Zealand Parliament.

== Backgrounds ==
The by-election was held on 7 February 1942 after the death of Lt-Col John Manchester Allen a National MP on 28 November 1941 while serving with the New Zealand Army in the Middle East (Libya). A by-election was necessary although Labour did not stand a candidate as an independent candidate stood against the National candidate, Andy Sutherland, in this strongly National-held seat.

== Candidates ==
=== National ===
There were five candidates for the National Party nomination.

- Hugh Dent, a storekeeper from Ngatea and chairman of the Hauraki National Party
- Edwin Palliser, a farmer from Waihou
- Charles Walter Parfitt, a farmer from Pipiroa and chairman of the Hauraki Plains County Council
- Ray L. Milne, a farmer from Te Kauwhata
- Andy Sutherland, a farmer from Ngāruawāhia and National candidate for Raglan in 1938

Sutherland was selected in a ballot by National Party supporters at a meeting in Hamilton.

=== Independent ===
Henry Thomas Head of Parnell in Auckland stood as an "independent returned soldiers" candidate. He was a candidate at the recent Waitemata by-election six months earlier, where he gained minimal support, polling just 88 votes.

== Results ==
The following table gives the election results:

1942 Hauraki by-election
| Party | Candidate | Votes | % | ±% |
|---|---|---|---|---|
| National | Andy Sutherland | 3,805 | 77.41 | |
| Independent | Henry Thomas Head | 1,082 | 22.01 | |
| Informal votes | | 29 | 0.58 | |
| Majority | | 2,723 | 55.39 | |
| Turnout | | 4,916 | | |
| Registered electors | | | | |

The final count with a total of 4,916 votes cast gave Sutherland 3,805, Head 1,082 with 29 informal votes. With the low turnout and the absence of a Labour candidate, the result is not significant.

== By-election date ==
In late November 1942 three MPs died (on 28, 29 and 30 November), two while on overseas military service. The date for the by-election(s) was a problem because of the post-Christmas break and because of the arrangements required for voting by servicemen overseas. Two by-elections were held on 7 February 1943 for Hauraki and Temuka where two independent candidates stood, but in Mid-Canterbury the widow of the sitting member was unopposed.

The date of the resultant by-elections had been discussed by Peter Fraser the Prime Minister and Minister in charge of the Electoral Department, the clerk of writs J. W. Heenan, and the speaker Bill Barnard. They were all National seats, and the Labour Party did not contest these wartime elections, but as independent candidates stood in two electorates, two by-elections were required. The speaker could not call them until the death was registered (which took longer for overseas deaths), and the Government Printing Office was closed for the Christmas-New Year holiday from 25 December to 7 January, so gazette notices could not be issued in that period. The notification of vacancies by the speaker was on 6 December 1941. A full period of 17 days was required between nomination day and polling day; ten days was too short because of the requirement to record soldier's votes from overseas. Heenan said that an election on Saturday 27 December was not possible although Saturday 31 January was; but Saturday 7 February 1942 was selected, with the last day for nominations 21 January and writs to be returned on 23 February. Warrants were issued on 13 January.
