= Geoff Gerard (politician) =

New Zealand politician (1904–1997)

The Honourable Geoff Gerard CMG
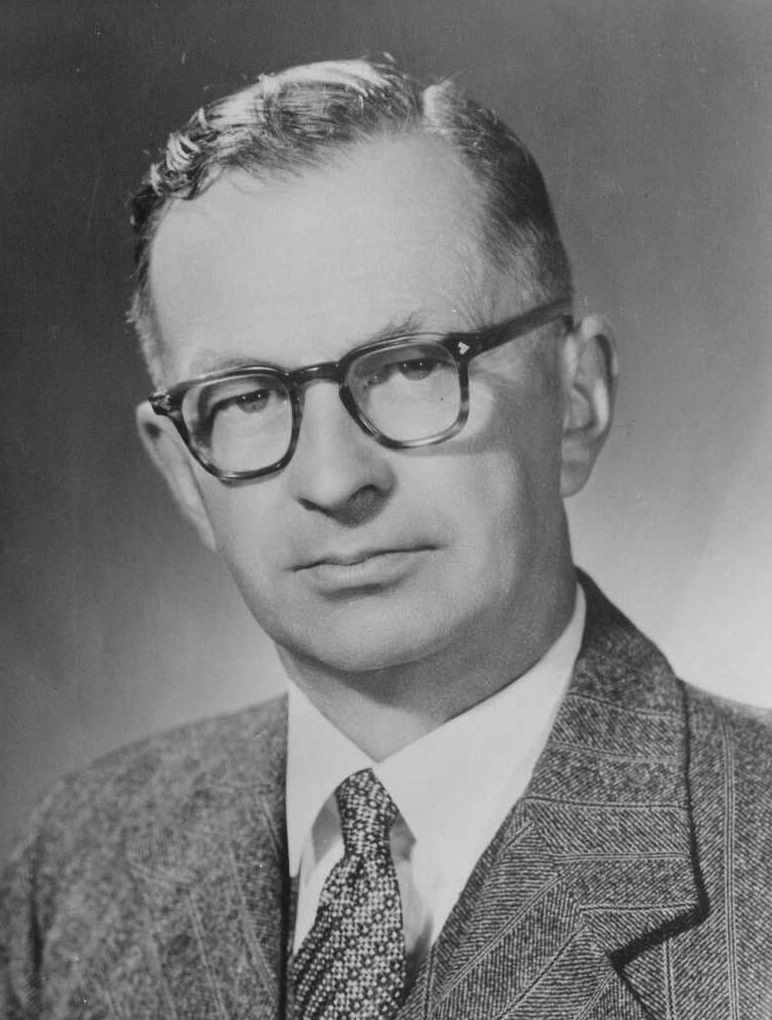
- Gerard in 1957

34th Minister of Lands
- In office 12 December 1960 – 12 December 1966
- Prime Minister: Keith Holyoake
- Preceded by: Jerry Skinner
- Succeeded by: Duncan MacIntyre
- In office 26 September 1957 – 12 December 1957
- Prime Minister: Keith Holyoake
- Preceded by: Ernest Corbett
- Succeeded by: Jerry Skinner

15th Minister of Forests
- In office 12 December 1960 – 12 December 1966
- Prime Minister: Keith Holyoake
- Preceded by: Eruera Tirikatene
- Succeeded by: Duncan MacIntyre
- In office 26 September 1957 – 12 December 1957
- Prime Minister: Keith Holyoake
- Preceded by: Sid Smith
- Succeeded by: Eruera Tirikatene

28th Minister of Marine
- In office 2 May 1961 – 20 December 1963
- Prime Minister: Keith Holyoake
- Preceded by: John McAlpine
- Succeeded by: Jack Scott
- In office 13 February 1957 – 12 December 1957
- Prime Minister: Sidney Holland; Keith Holyoake
- Preceded by: John McAlpine
- Succeeded by: Bill Fox

7th Minister of Social Security
- In office 13 February 1957 – 26 September 1957
- Prime Minister: Sidney Holland; Keith Holyoake
- Preceded by: Dean Eyre
- Succeeded by: Jack Scott

Member of the New Zealand Parliament for Mid-Canterbury
- In office 25 September 1943 – 27 September 1946
- Preceded by: Mary Grigg
- Succeeded by: Electorate abolished

Member of the New Zealand Parliament for Ashburton
- In office 27 September 1946 – 26 November 1966
- Preceded by: Electorate re-established
- Succeeded by: Rob Talbot

Personal details
- Born: Richard Geoffrey Gerard; 4 October 1904 Christchurch, New Zealand
- Died: 26 September 1997 (aged 92)
- Party: National
- Spouse: Margaret Scott (m. 1928; died 1988)
- Relations: Jim Gerard (son)
- Children: 5
- Profession: Farmer

Richard Geoffrey Gerard CMG (4 October 1904 – 26 September 1997) was a New Zealand politician of the National Party, and a cabinet minister.

== Biography ==
New Zealand Parliament
| Years | Term | Electorate | Party |
|---|---|---|---|
| 1943–1946 | 27th | Mid-Canterbury | National |
| 1946–1949 | 28th | Ashburton | National |
| 1949–1951 | 29th | Ashburton | National |
| 1951–1954 | 30th | Ashburton | National |
| 1954–1957 | 31st | Ashburton | National |
| 1957–1960 | 32nd | Ashburton | National |
| 1960–1963 | 33rd | Ashburton | National |
| 1963–1966 | 34th | Ashburton | National |

Gerard was born in Christchurch on 6 October 1904. He received his education at Christ's College and then farmed at Mount Hutt.

On 1 August 1928, Gerard married Margaret Scott at All Saints' Church, Sumner, and the couple went on to have five children.

Gerard represented the Canterbury electorates of Mid-Canterbury from 1943 to 1946, and then the Ashburton electorate from 1946 to 1966 when he retired. He was Minister of Marine under Holland and Holyoake (1957, 1961–1963), Minister of Social Security (1957) under Holland and Holyoake, Minister of Lands under Holyoake (1957, 1960–1966), and Minister of Forests under Holyoake (1957, 1960–1966).

Outside of Parliament, Gerard was a member of the Nature Conservation Council from 1967 to 1974, and a member of the Lyttelton Harbour Board from 1968 to 1980.

In 1953, Gerard was awarded the Queen Elizabeth II Coronation Medal. In 1967, he was granted retention of the title The Honourable, in recognition of his term as a member of the Executive Council. He was appointed a Companion of the Order of St Michael and St George, for public services, in the 1981 New Year Honours. In 1990, he received the New Zealand 1990 Commemoration Medal.

Gerard died on 26 September 1997, having been predeceased by his wife, Margaret, in 1988. His son Jim followed in his footsteps, representing the Rangiora electorate from 1984.

== Notes ==
Political offices
| Preceded by Sid Smith | Minister of Forests; 1957; 1960–1966 | Succeeded by Eruera Tirikatene |
| Preceded by Eruera Tirikatene | Minister of Forests; 1957; 1960–1966 | Succeeded by Duncan MacIntyre |
New Zealand Parliament
| Preceded by Mary Grigg | Member of Parliament for Mid-Canterbury; 1943–1946 | Constituency abolished |
| In abeyance Title last held by William Nosworthy | Member of Parliament for Ashburton; 1946–1966 | Succeeded by Rob Talbot |
