= John Manchester Allen =

New Zealand politician

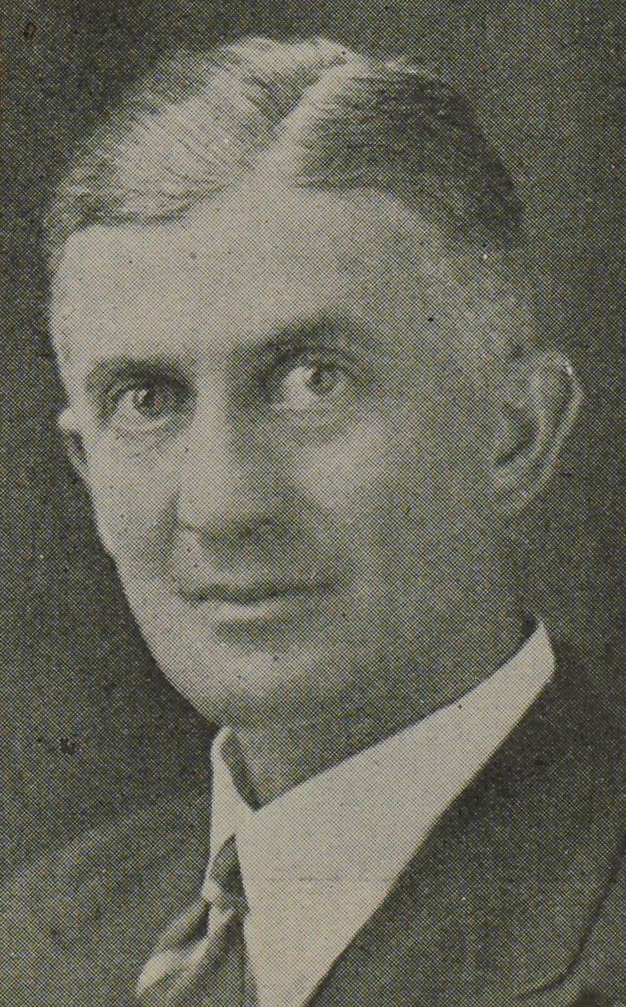

Member of the New Zealand Parliament for Hauraki
- In office 15 October 1938 – 28 November 1941 †
- Preceded by: Charles Robert Petrie
- Succeeded by: Andy Sutherland

Personal details
- Born: 3 August 1901 Cheadle, Staffordshire, England
- Died: 28 November 1941 (aged 40) Libya
- Cause of death: Killed in action
- Relatives: Stephen Allen (uncle); William Allen (uncle); William Shepherd Allen (grandfather); John Candlish (great-grandfather)

Military service
- Branch/service: New Zealand Military Forces
- Years of service: 1939–41
- Rank: Lieutenant Colonel
- Commands: 21st Battalion
- Battles/wars: Second World War; Battle of Greece; Battle of Crete; North African campaign; Operation Crusader †
- Awards: Mentioned in dispatches

John Manchester Allen (3 August 1901 – 28 November 1941) was a New Zealand politician of the National Party. He also served in the Second World War and commanded the 21st Battalion from May 1941 until he was killed in action in Libya.

== Biography ==
New Zealand Parliament
Years	Term	Electorate	Party
1938–1941	26th	Hauraki	National

Allen was born in Cheadle, Staffordshire, England, in 1901. His father, John Candlish Allen, died in France in 1917 from wounds received in the First World War. His uncles were Stephen Allen and William Allen, and his grandfather was William Shepherd Allen. He was educated at King's College, Auckland, and at Pembroke College, Cambridge where he graduated with MA and LLB degrees. He was a farmer in Morrinsville, and an Anglican lay reader.

He represented the Hauraki electorate from 1938 to 1941, when he died. Following the outbreak of the Second World War, he volunteered to serve with the 2nd New Zealand Expeditionary Force and was posted to 18th Battalion as its second-in-command. He was in Crete as commander of the 21st Battalion before being killed in action during an offensive in Libya. He was succeeded in the Hauraki electorate by Andy Sutherland, who won the resulting 1942 by-election.

== Notes ==
New Zealand Parliament
Preceded by Charles Robert Petrie	Member of Parliament for Hauraki; 1938–1941	Succeeded by Andy Sutherland
