= Florence Ada Mary Lamb Polson =

New Zealand rural women's advocate (1877–1941)

Florence Ada Mary Lamb Polson (1877–1941) was a New Zealand rural women's advocate. She was born in Aberfeldy, Victoria, Australia.

In 1910 she married William Polson, who was President of New Zealand Farmers' Union and later MP for Stratford. Florence helped found the Women's Division of the New Zealand Farmers' Union and became its first president from 1925 to 1929.
