= Mary Grigg =

New Zealand politician (1897–1971)

Mary Grigg, Lady Polson MBE

Member of the New Zealand Parliament for Mid-Canterbury
- Preceded by: Arthur Grigg
- Succeeded by: Geoff Gerard
- Majority: Unopposed

Personal details
- Born: Mary Victoria Cracroft Wilson; 18 August 1897 Culverden, New Zealand
- Died: 22 December 1971 (aged 74)
- Party: National
- Spouses: Arthur Grigg (m. 1920; died 1941) William Polson (m. 1943; died 1960)
- Relations: Nicola Grigg (great-granddaughter); John Cracroft Wilson (grandfather); John Hall (grandfather)

Mary Victoria Cracroft Grigg, Lady Polson, MBE (née Wilson; 18 August 1897 – 22 December 1971) was a New Zealand politician of the National Party.

== Early life ==
She was born as Mary Victoria Cracroft Wilson at Culverden in 1897. Her parents were John Wilson, a sheepfarmer, and Mildred Hall. Her paternal grandfather was John Cracroft Wilson, and her maternal grandfather was John Hall; both had been prominent MPs. Her mother was known for her involvement with public activities, particularly those involving women.

Grigg was educated for eight years at the Brondesbury School in London, where she became a head girl. During the First World War she served in the nursing division of the VAD (Voluntary Aid Division).

== Political career ==
New Zealand Parliament
Years	Term	Electorate	Party
1942–1943	27th	Mid-Canterbury	National

In 1941 Grigg was elected onto the Ashburton Hospital Board and became its first woman member. She was also president of the Ashburton Plunket Society, a member of the Red Cross executive and President of the Mount Somers Ladies' Guild. When her husband Arthur Grigg rejoined the army, she took over his parliamentary duties in the electorate.

She was elected to represent the Mid-Canterbury electorate in Parliament from 1942 after the death (on 29 November 1941) of her husband Arthur Grigg in a political practice known as widow's succession. She had married Grigg in 1920, and he had held the Mid-Canterbury electorate from 1938.

Her greatest area of concern was farming issues, followed by housing, health and education. In 1942 she joined with other women MPs from both sides of the House to argue that the number of women police officers should be increased and that they should be issued with a uniform. She also campaigned for women to be permitted to sit on juries.

She married William Polson MP on 29 June 1943 and did not seek re-election in the September 1943 general election.

Grigg continued to be active in the National Party after her parliamentary career ended. She supported Hilda Ross in her first election campaign in 1945, and in 1949 Ross and Grigg co-wrote the National Party's election manifesto.

She was appointed a Member of the Order of the British Empire in the 1946 New Year Honours. She was styled Lady Polson when her second husband was knighted in the 1951 Birthday Honours.

She was the fourth woman to be elected to Parliament after Elizabeth McCombs, Catherine Stewart and Mary Dreaver, and the first woman not from the Labour Party to be elected.

Lady Polson was the President of Victoria League Canterbury from 1965 to 1970.

New Zealand Parliament
Preceded by Arthur Grigg	Member of Parliament for Mid-Canterbury; 1942–1943	Succeeded by Geoff Gerard
