= Andy Sutherland =

New Zealand politician

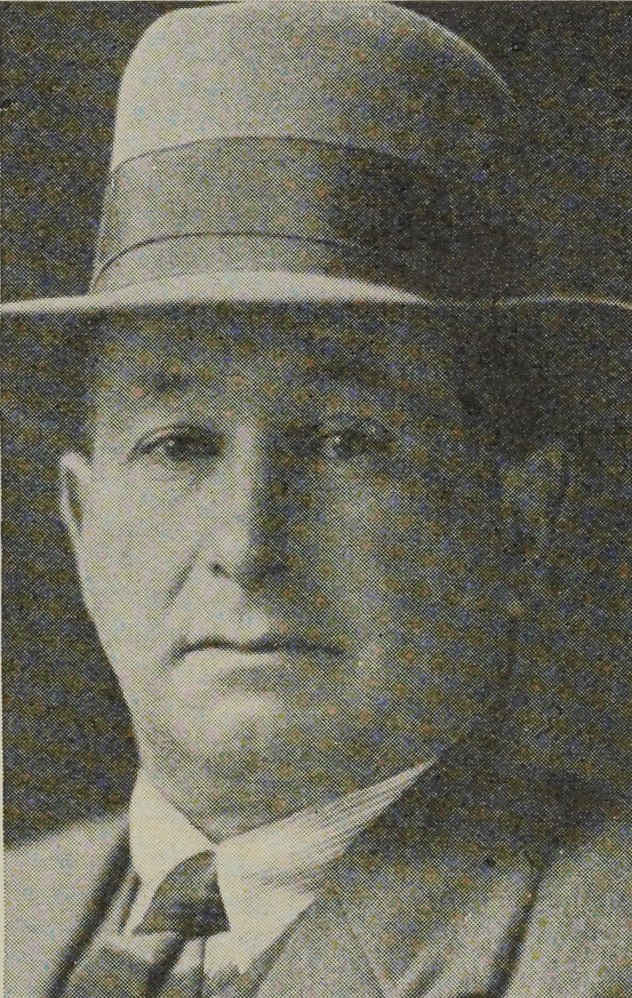
Sutherland in 1938

Andrew Sinclair Sutherland CBE (13 September 1882 – 2 May 1961) was a New Zealand politician of the National Party.

== Biography ==
New Zealand Parliament
Years	Term	Electorate	Party
1942–1943	26th	Hauraki	National
1943–1946	27th	Hauraki	National
1946–1949	28th	Hauraki	National
1949–1951	29th	Hauraki	National
1951–1954	30th	Hauraki	National

Sutherland was born in 1882 in Palmerston, Otago. He was a member of the 9th New Zealand contingent (1902) to the Boer War.

He contested the 1938 in the Raglan electorate against the incumbent, Labour's Lee Martin, but was unsuccessful. He represented the Hauraki electorate from a 1942 by-election, caused by the death of John Manchester Allen, to 1954, when he retired. He was senior whip from 1950 to 1954.

In 1953, Sullivan was awarded the Queen Elizabeth II Coronation Medal. In the 1955 Queen's Birthday Honours, he was appointed a Commander of the Order of the British Empire, for public services.

== Notes ==
New Zealand Parliament
Preceded by John Manchester Allen	Member of Parliament for Hauraki; 1942–1954	Succeeded by Arthur Kinsella
