= William Polson =

New Zealand politician

The Honourable Sir William Polson KCMG
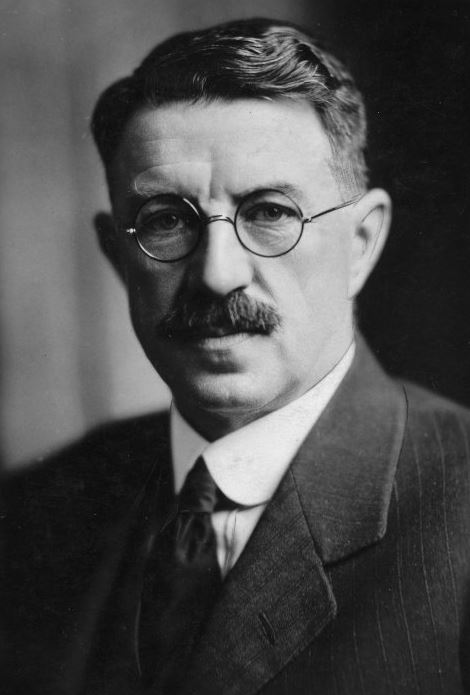
- Polson c. 1930

Member of the New Zealand Parliament for Stratford
- In office 14 November 1928 – 27 November 1946
- Preceded by: Edward Walter
- Succeeded by: Seat abolished

Member of the New Zealand Legislative Council
- In office 15 March 1950 – 31 December 1950

Personal details
- Born: 6 June 1875 Wanganui, New Zealand
- Died: 8 October 1960 (aged 85) Mangamahu, New Zealand
- Party: Independent (1928–1936); National (1936–1960)
- Spouse(s): Florence Polson (1910–1941); Mary Grigg (1943–1960)
- Children: 4
- Occupation: Farmer

Sir William John Polson KCMG (6 June 1875 – 8 October 1960) was a New Zealand politician, first as an independent and then in the National Party. He joined the National Party on its formation in 1936, and "later acted effectively as Holland's deputy".

== Biography ==
=== Early life and career ===
Polson was born in Wanganui to Scottish immigrants Donald Gunn Polson and Janet Campbell Gillies, and was educated at Wanganui Collegiate School. After finishing school he worked on his father's farm until ill health caused him to cease work. During his recuperation he taught himself shorthand and later became a journalist.

He was Wellington provincial president of New Zealand Farmers' Union from 1920 to 1921 and became dominion president from 1921 to 1936. Polson's position as president meant he became prominent in national politics. He clashed with the Reform government over meat marketing in 1919, monopolistic marketing trusts in the face of a produce price slump in 1921. He initiated the Meat Export Control Act in 1922 to help local farmers’ profits.

He had married Florence Ada Mary Lamb Wilson in 1910 with whom he had four children. Florence helped found the Women's Division of the New Zealand Farmers' Union and became its first president from 1925 to 1929.

=== Political career ===
New Zealand Parliament
Years	Term	Electorate	Party
1928–1931	23rd	Stratford	Independent
1931–1935	24th	Stratford	Independent
1935–1936	25th	Stratford	Independent
1936–1938	Changed allegiance to:		National
1938–1943	26th	Stratford	National
1943–1946	27th	Stratford	National

Polson was a member of the Wanganui County Council from 1911 to 1917 and for three years he was the council's chairman. He was also a member of the Wanganui Harbour Board. As council chairman he instigated the construction of the Durie Hill Elevator.

Polson represented the electorate of Stratford in Parliament from 1928 to 1946. He retired from Parliament in 1946, when the seat of Stratford was eliminated by electoral boundary changes. He made a point of declining the United Party nomination, believing it more befitting that the leader of the Farmers' Union be non-partisan. In 1936, following the election of the First Labour Government, Polson resigned as Farmers' Union president and joined the new National Party.

Polson played a key role in replacing Adam Hamilton as National Party leader with Sidney Holland. Thereafter Holland maintained Polson as a close confidant and he became Deputy Leader of the Opposition (an informal post at the time) as a sign to preserve unity between both the rural and urban sectors of the National Party. On 30 June 1942 Polson became minister of primary production for war purposes in Peter Fraser's short-lived War Administration until 2 October when he resigned. In 1943 he was acting Leader of the Opposition whilst Holland was overseas. During World War II he was a strong advocator that New Zealand forces should be deployed in the Pacific theatre, not Europe.

In 1943 he married Mary Grigg, who had represented the Mid-Canterbury electorate from 1942, after her MP husband Arthur Grigg, then a major in the NZEF, was killed in Libya in 1941.

He was appointed to the Legislative Council on 15 March 1950, as a member of the suicide squad which was to vote the Council out of existence. From 15 March 1950 until 12 December 1950 he was a Minister without portfolio in the First National Government.

=== Later life and death ===
He died at his home in Mangamahu on 8 October 1960, survived by his second wife and two sons and a daughter from his first marriage.

== Honours ==
In 1935, Polson was awarded the King George V Silver Jubilee Medal. In the 1951 King's Birthday Honours, he was appointed a Knight Commander of the Order of St Michael and St George for public and political services.

== Notes ==
Government offices
Preceded by David Wilson	Leader of the Legislative Council; 1950	Abolished
New Zealand Parliament
Preceded by Edward Walter	Member of Parliament for Stratford; 1928–1946	Vacant Constituency abolished, recreated in 1954 Title next held by Thomas Murray
