= Thomas Francis Doyle =

New Zealand politician

The Honourable Thomas Francis Doyle
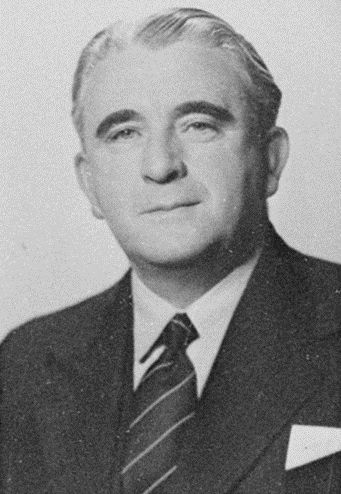

Member of the Legislative Council
- In office 9 March 1936 – 8 March 1950
- Appointed by: Michael Joseph Savage

Personal details
- Born: 1893 Bluff, New Zealand
- Died: 1968 (aged 74–75) Invercargill, New Zealand
- Party: Labour Party

Thomas Francis Doyle (1893–1968) was a member of the New Zealand Legislative Council from 1936 to 1950.

== Biography ==
Doyle was born in 1893. He was Mayor of Bluff for 14 years. He stood for the Labour Party in the 1935 election in the Awarua electorate and came second to James Hargest.

Doyle was a member of the Legislative Council from 9 March 1936 to 8 March 1943, and then 9 March 1943 to 8 March 1950. He was appointed by the First Labour Government. In 1944, he was appointed to the inaugural Invercargill Licensing Trust board.

Following the abolition of the Legislative Council he stood again for the House of Representatives in the 1957 election in the Invercargill electorate where he raised the Labour vote, but finished runner-up to Ralph Hanan. He intended to run again in 1960, but withdrew in favour of Hanan's former batman, Oliver James Henderson.
