= Jeremiah Connolly =

New Zealand politician

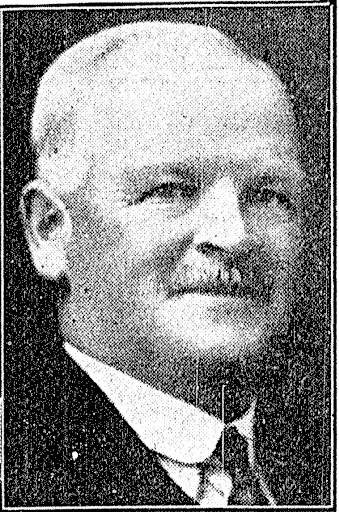
Jeremiah Connolly

Jeremiah Connolly (1875 – 2 October 1935) was an Independent Liberal Member of Parliament for Mid-Canterbury, in the South Island of New Zealand.

== Early life ==
Connolly was born in Geraldine in 1875 and educated at Hilton School. He was a farmer. In 1902 Connolly purchased the Raukapuka Estate, which he sold in 1919. He then acquired the Langley Estate at Rakaia.

During World War I Connolly was a member of the National Efficiency Board (1917–18) and of various patriotic societies.

== Member of Parliament ==
New Zealand Parliament
Years	Term	Electorate	Party
1931–1935	24th	Mid‑Canterbury	Independent Liberal

Connolly stood as an Independent Coalition Liberal in support of the United/Reform Coalition in the 1931 election and was successful. He represented the Mid-Canterbury electorate in the New Zealand House of Representatives until his death in 1935.

In 1935, he was awarded the King George V Silver Jubilee Medal.

== Death ==
He collapsed and died in a taxi-cab in Wellington, when going from Parliament to his hotel. He was stated to have had heart problems.

New Zealand Parliament
Preceded by David Jones	Member of Parliament for Mid-Canterbury; 1931–1935	Succeeded by Horace Herring
