= Elizabeth Gilmer =

New Zealand horticulturalist and activist (1840–1960)

Dame Elizabeth Gilmer DBE
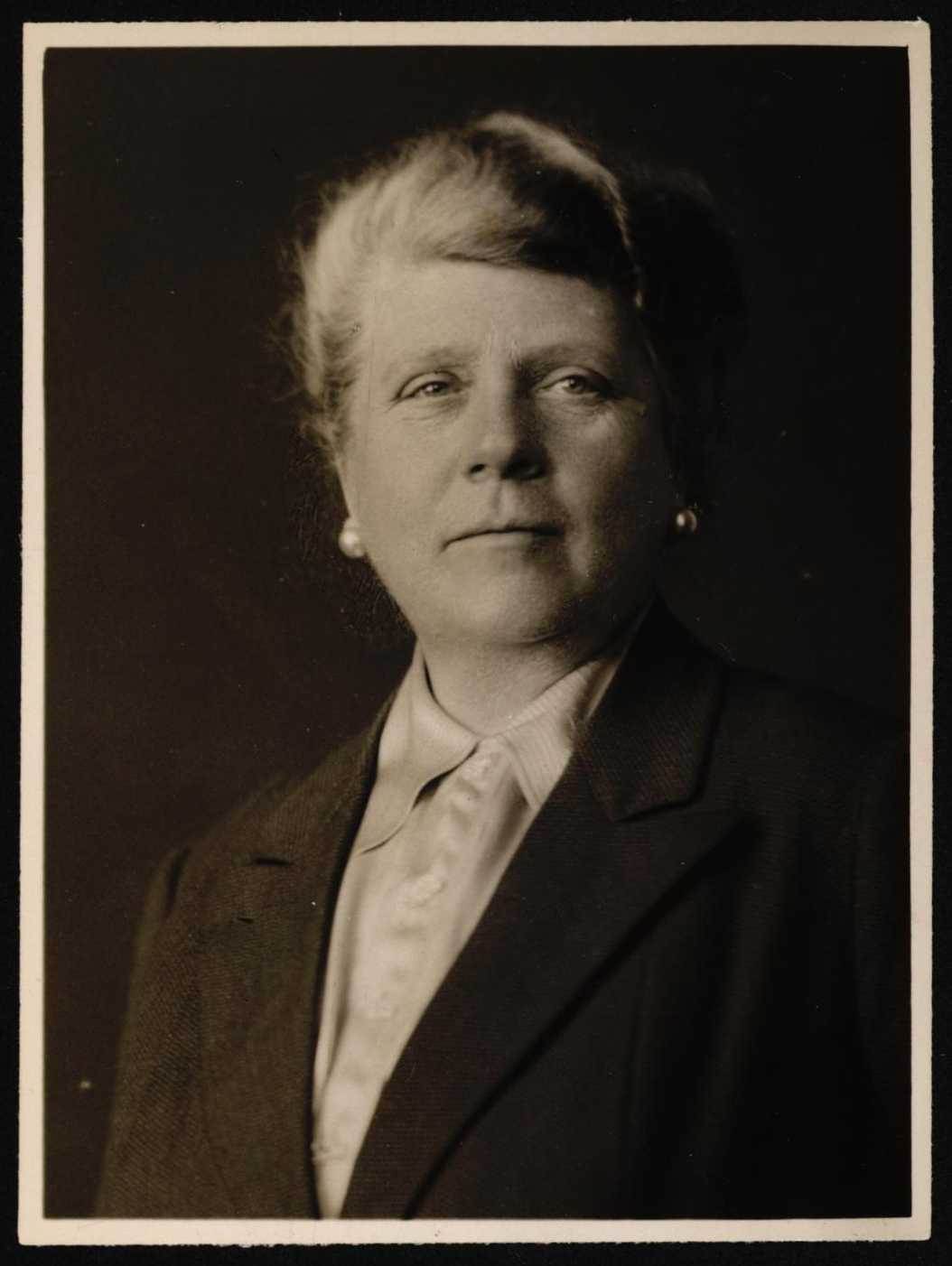

Wellington City Councillor
- In office 1941–1953

Personal details
- Born: Elizabeth May Seddon; 24 March 1880 Kumara, New Zealand
- Died: 29 February 1960 (aged 79) Wellington, New Zealand
- Spouse: Knox Gilmer
- Children: 2
- Relatives: Richard Seddon (father); Tom Seddon (brother)

Dame Elizabeth May Gilmer DBE FRHortS (née Seddon; 24 March 1880 – 29 February 1960) was a New Zealand social worker, educationist and horticulturist. She chaired the Lady Galway Patriotic Guild.

== Early life and career ==
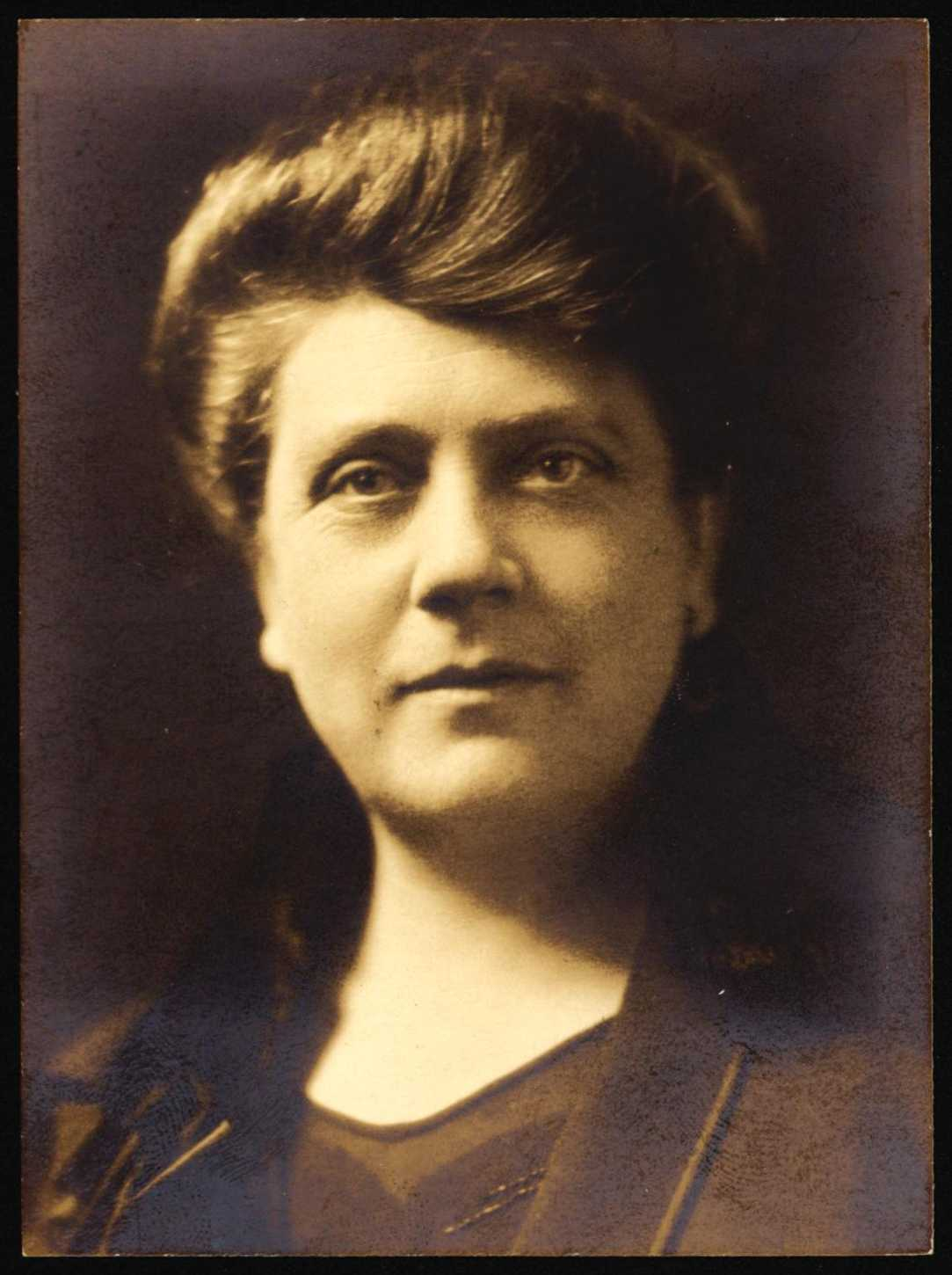
Elizabeth Gilmer passport photo (1925)

Born as Elizabeth May Seddon at Kumara to the future New Zealand Prime Minister Richard Seddon and Louisa Jane (Spotswood) Seddon, she attended the Kumara School and Wellington Girls' College. Throughout her life she was involved in a staggering array of welfare and women's organisations in addition to her most abiding interests which were conservation and horticulture. She was a prominent member of the Wellington branch of the National Council of Women and represented New Zealand at the international council's conference at Lugano, Switzerland, in 1949. From 1934 to 1957 she served as the Government nominee on the Wellington Colleges' Board of Governors. She worked on the passage of the Native Plant Protection Act and the reinstatement of Arbor Day.

== Political career ==
Gilmer was a member of the Wellington Hospital Board from 1938 to 1953. As a result of her advocacy, the hospital developed the most up-to-date maternity service in New Zealand. Her perpetual interest in nurses' welfare led to vast improvements being made in the conditions under which they worked.

In 1941, she was elected to the Wellington City Council, where she served 12 years as chair of both the Libraries and Parks and Reserves Committees. At the 1944, 1947 and 1950 local elections she "topped the poll", receiving more votes than any other candidate. In recognition of this, she was nominated for the position of deputy mayor in 1950, but lost in a ballot to William Stevens. Gilmer’s own colleagues in the Citizens' Association backed Stevens in preference to her, though she

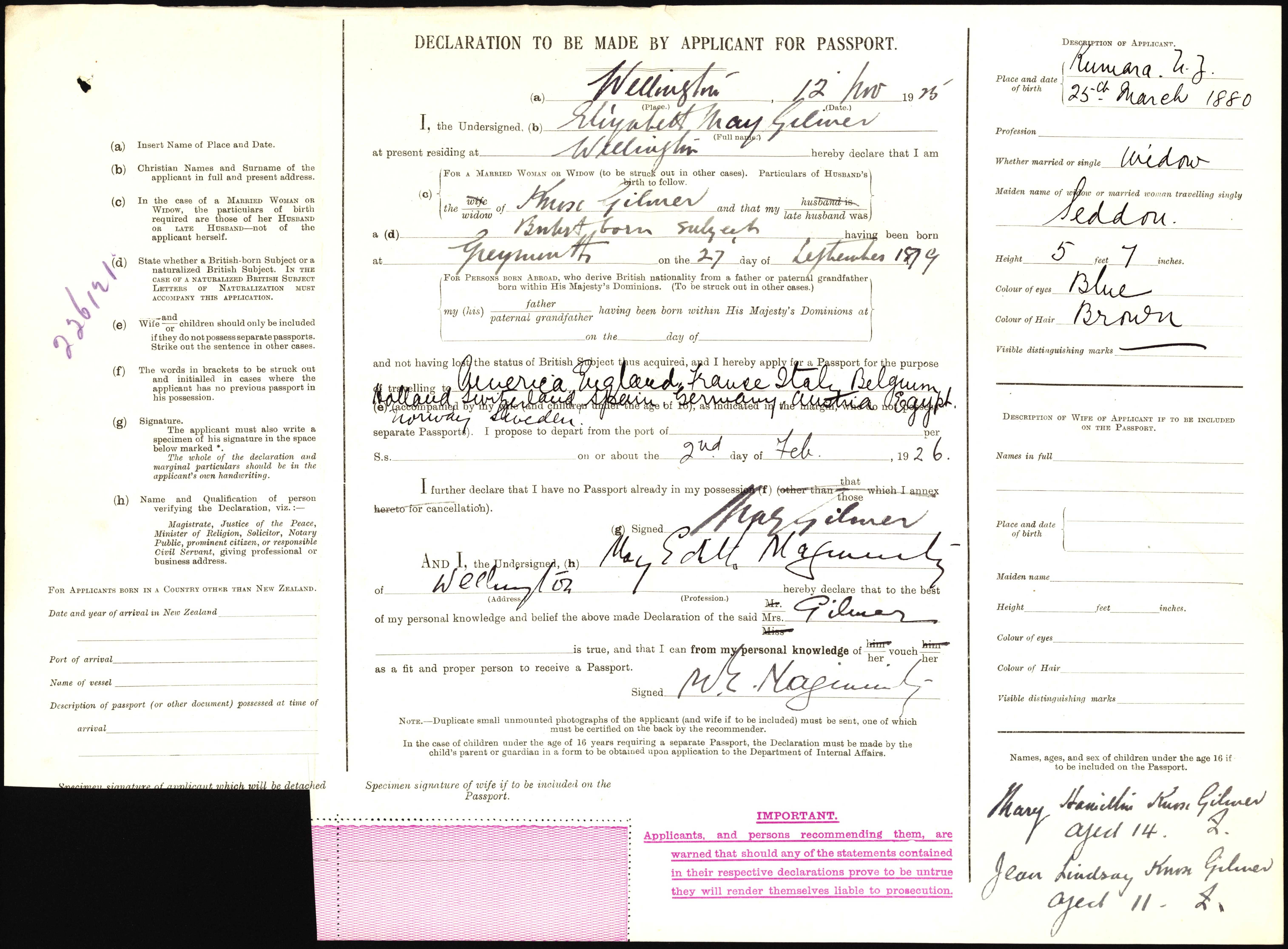
Elizabeth Gilmer passport application (1925)

received the support of the Labour Party councillors. Dropped from the Citizens' Association ticket in 1953, she accepted the request of a public deputation to stand for re-election as an independent, but lost her seat on the council.

She stood twice for Parliament unsuccessfully in both the 1935 and 1938 general elections in the Wellington North electorate as an independent candidate, but declined to accept nomination for any political party, though in the latter she received tacit support from the National Party. Her campaign in 1935 was noted for large public audiences and large media attention, drawing a connection to the political career of her father Richard Seddon, the 15th Premier of New Zealand.

== Honours ==
For her contributions during the First and Second World Wars, Gilmer was awarded, firstly, the OBE (1946), and then the DBE (1951). She was the first New Zealand woman to be awarded a knighthood. Gilmer was awarded the Greek Red Cross medal in 1937, and the Coronation Medal in 1953.

== Family ==
On 3 July 1907, at St Paul's Church, Thorndon, Wellington, she married Knox Gilmer (1879–1921); they had two daughters. They lived at Te Marua, Upper Hutt.

== Death ==
Gilmer died at Wellington on 29 February 1960, at age 79.
