= Arthur Grigg =

New Zealand politician

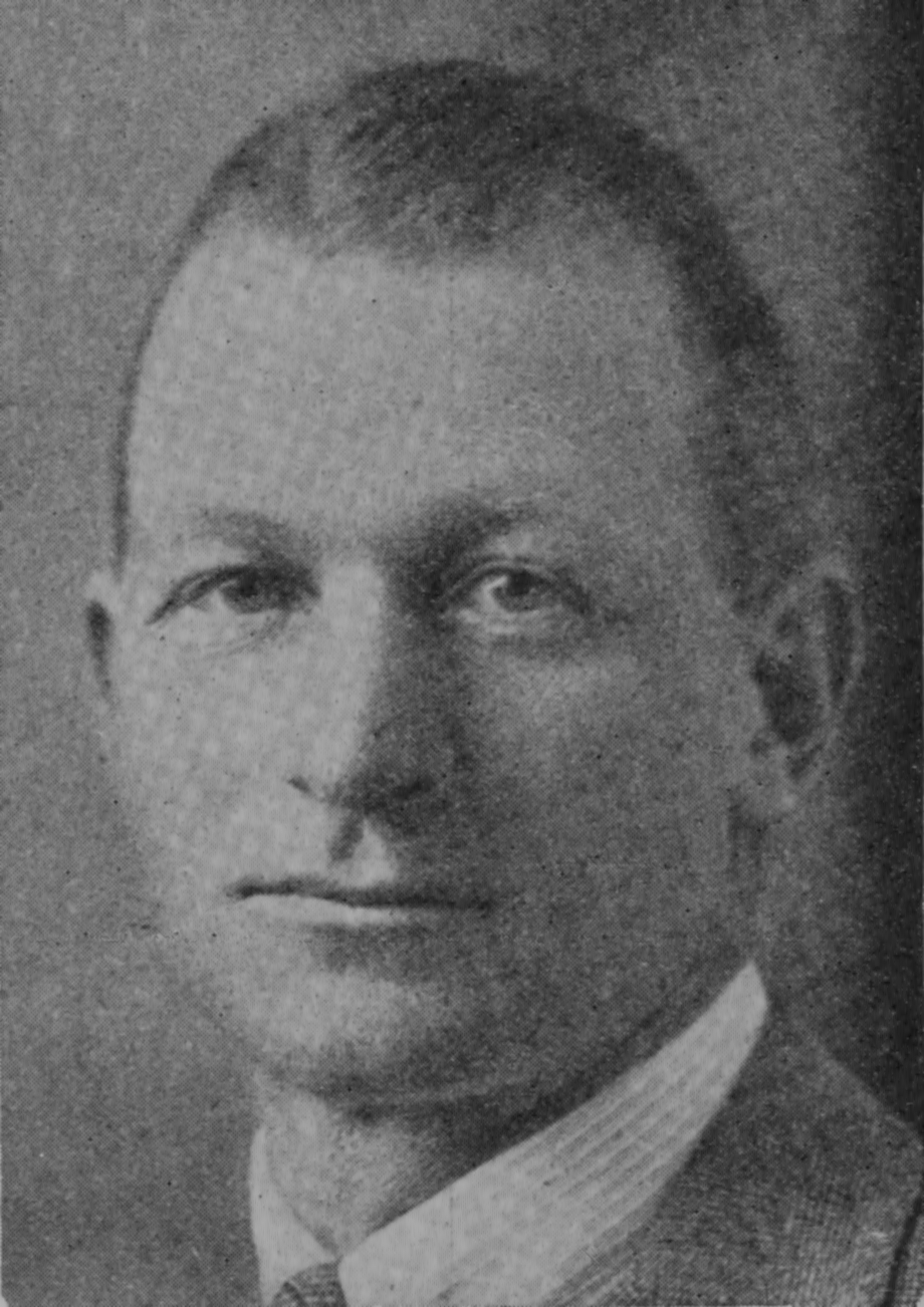
Grigg in 1938

Arthur Nattle Grigg MC (1896 – 29 November 1941) was a New Zealand politician of the National Party.

== Biography ==
New Zealand Parliament
Years	Term	Electorate	Party
1938–1941	26th	Mid-Canterbury	National

Grigg was born in 1896 to farmer John Charles Nattle Grigg and Alice Montgomerie Hutton, making him a grandson of prominent Canterbury runholder John Grigg. He was educated at Christ's College and was to become a farmer upon completing his education.

During World War I Grigg served in the Royal Field Artillery from 1916 to 1919. After returning home he married Mary Cracroft Wilson in 1920, with whom he had two sons and a daughter. Grigg represented the electorate of Mid-Canterbury in Parliament from the 1938 election, when he defeated Horace Herring. He was a Major in the NZEF in World War II, and was killed on 29 November 1941 when Brigadier Hargest's headquarters in Libya was overrun. He was posthumously awarded the Military Cross.

Prime Minister Peter Fraser described Grigg as "a young member of ability and promise". His widow Mary Grigg succeeded him in the Mid-Canterbury electorate and became the first woman National MP, but retired when she remarried.

New Zealand Parliament
Preceded by Horace Herring	Member of Parliament for Mid-Canterbury; 1938–1941	Succeeded by Mary Grigg
