= Horace Herring =

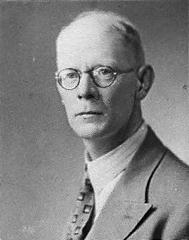
Horace Herring in 1935

Horace Edgar Herring (1884 – 9 January 1962) was a New Zealand Member of Parliament for Mid-Canterbury. Born in England and a mechanical engineer and draughtsman, he came to New Zealand in 1909.

== Member of Parliament ==
New Zealand Parliament
Years	Term	Electorate	Party
1935–1938	25th	Mid-Canterbury	Labour

Horace Herring represented the Mid-Canterbury electorate for the Labour Party between 1935 and 1938.

He was a supporter of John A. Lee and stood as a Democratic Labour Party candidate at the 1943 Christchurch East by-election, which was won by Mabel Howard. Horace Herring received a very creditable 2,578 votes; 26.7% of the total cast. Labour MP Ormond Wilson, described Herring as "a character only Dickens could have invented". (See also a description of his Maiden Speech in Parliament.)

Herring was awarded the Coronation Medal in 1937 for services to New Zealand.

He was Mayor of Levin from 1953 to 1956.

== Notes ==
New Zealand Parliament
Preceded by Jeremiah Connolly	Member of Parliament for Mid-Canterbury; 1935–1938	Succeeded by Arthur Grigg
