= 1938 New Zealand general election =

- 14 (Māori) & 15 October (general) 1938

All 80 seats in the New Zealand Parliament 41 seats were needed for a majority
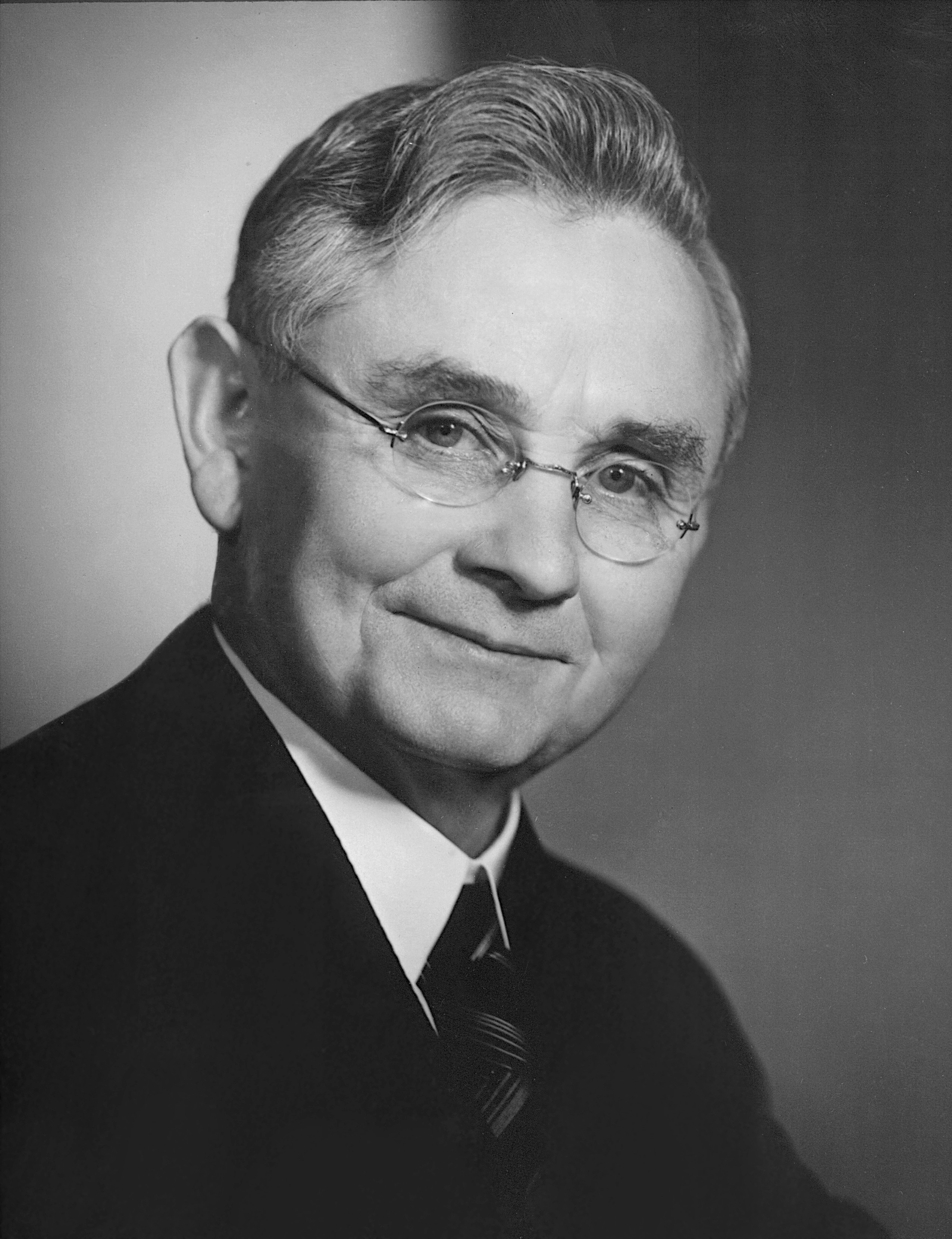

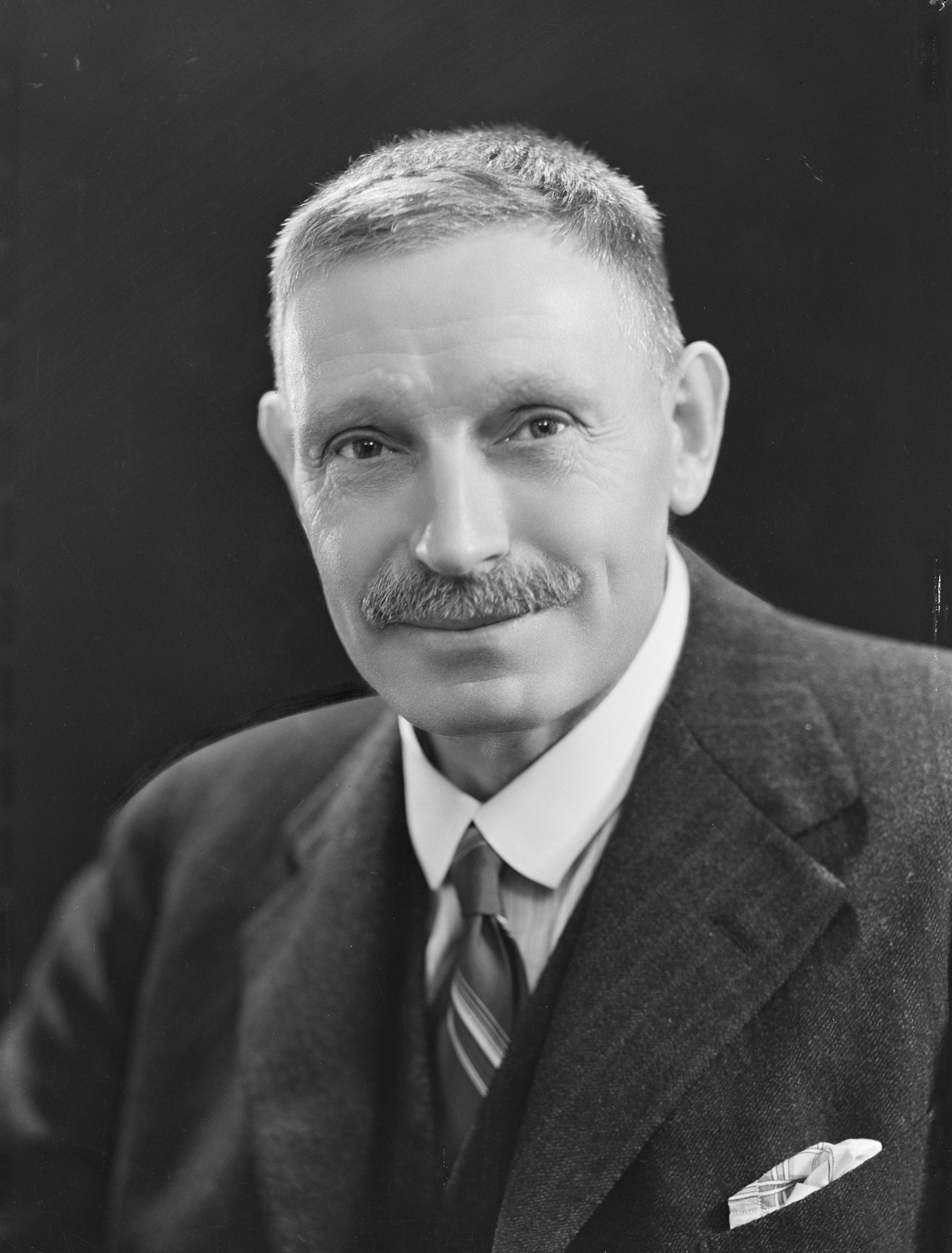
	First party	Second party
Leader	Michael Joseph Savage	Adam Hamilton
Party	Labour	National
Leader since	12 October 1933	31 October 1936
Leader's seat	Auckland West	Wallace
Last election	53 seats, 45.7%	19 seats, 32.9% (as United–Reform Coalition)
Seats won	53	25
Seat change	Steady	▲6
Popular vote	528,290	381,081
Percentage	55.8%	40.3%
Swing	▲10.1%	▲7.4%
- Results of the election.
Prime Minister before election
Michael Joseph Savage
Labour
Subsequent Prime Minister
Michael Joseph Savage
Labour

The 1938 New Zealand general election was a nationwide vote to determine the shape of the New Zealand Parliament's 26th term. It resulted in the governing Labour Party being re-elected in a landslide, winning nearly 56% of the vote despite not gaining any more seats. Having replaced the United-Reform coalition, the newly founded National Party also gained a certain amount of ground.

This was the first election in which the Māori were given a secret ballot which had been available to white voters since 1870.

== Background ==
The Labour Party had won a resounding victory in the 1935 elections, winning fifty-three seats. Shortly after the elections, the two Ratana-aligned MPs also merged into the Labour Party, giving Labour a total of fifty-five seats. The government, a coalition of the United Party and the Reform Party, had won only nineteen seats. Shortly after their defeat, United and Reform agreed to merge into the National Party, which positioned itself as the only alternative to the "socialist" Labour Party. However, Labour remained popular with the public, and the Prime Minister, Michael Joseph Savage, was widely praised for his welfare reform. The leadership of the National Party, by contrast, was closely associated by the public with the Great Depression, and struggled to gain traction.

== The election ==
The date for the main 1938 elections was 15 October, a Saturday. Elections to the four Maori electorates were held the day before. 995,173 people were registered to vote, and there was a turnout of 92.9%. This turnout was the highest ever recorded at that point, although it was later exceeded in the two elections after World War II and in the 1984 elections. The number of seats being contested was 80, a number which had been fixed since 1902.

== Results ==
The 1938 election saw a decisive win for the governing Labour Party, which won fifty-three seats. This was a drop of two from what it held prior to the election. While Labour gained the seats of Bay of Islands, Motueka (previously held by Keith Holyoake), New Plymouth, Wellington Suburbs, and Northern Maori, it lost Tauranga and the rural seats of Manawatu, Rangitikei, Waikato, Mid-Canterbury, and Waipawa.

The National Party won twenty-five seats, an increase of six from that the United–Reform Coalition had previously won. Both Labour and National increased their share of the popular vote, with Labour winning 55.8% (up from 46.1%) and National winning 40.3% (up from 32.9%). This increase was at the expense of the Democrat Party (who had merged into National in 1936) and the agrarian monetary reformist Country Party, which saw its votes collapse completely. The Country Party lost the two seats it held (Bay of Islands and Franklin) as, unlike 1935, Labour stood candidates in the seats held by the two Country Party members. Hence Harold Rushworth did not stand in the Bay of Islands seat, and Arthur Sexton came third in Franklin.

Independent candidates also lost ground, with only two being elected, Harry Atmore (Nelson) and Charles Wilkinson (Egmont). As in 1935, the independents were tactically supported by one of the major parties who did not stand a candidate against them, and they generally voted with that party; Wilkinson and Wright had supported National while Atmore had supported Labour. But Robert Wright was defeated for the new electorate of Wellington West by Labour despite National not running a candidate against him.

An analysis of men and women on the rolls against the votes recorded showed that in the 1938 election 92.85% of those on the European rolls voted; men 93.43% and women 92.27%. In the 1935 election the figures were 90.75% with men 92.02% and women 89.46%. As the Māori electorates did not have electoral rolls they could not be included.

This was the first election in which the Māori were given a secret ballot. Secret ballots had been available to white voters since 1870, but it was not extended to Māori voters until the 1937 Electoral Amendment Act was passed. The number of votes cast in the Māori seats in the 1938 election rose 18.3% from the 1935 election. Opponents of the secret ballot for the Māori claimed that the Māori suffered from illiteracy, but only 2.28% of the ballots were ruled invalid. Member of Parliament Eruera Tirikatene praised the secret ballot for the Māori as he regarded it as one of the rights promised in the Treaty of Waitangi.

=== Party standings ===
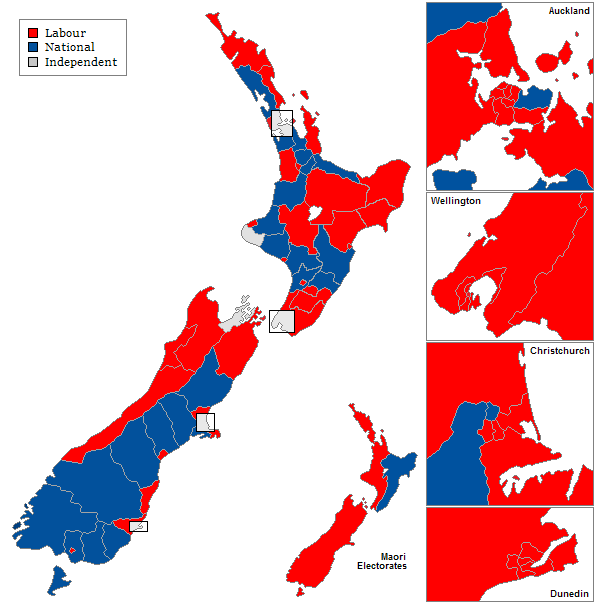
Map of electorates.

Election results
Party	Candidates	Votes	Percentage	Seats won	change
Labour	78	528,290	55.80	53	-2*
National	77	381,081	40.30	25	+9
Country Party	5	2,199	0.23	0	-2
Independents	16	34,823	3.65	2	-3
Total	176	946,393		80	

*includes two Ratana MPs (Toko Ratana, Eruera Tirikatene) who joined the Labour caucus after the 1935 election

=== Votes summary ===
Popular Vote
Labour	55.80%
National	40.30%
Country Party	0.23%
Independent	3.65%

Parliament seats
Labour	66.25%
National	31.25%
Independent	2.50%

=== Electorate results ===
The following table shows the detailed results:

Key

Labour National Country Party Independent Independent Liberal

Electorate results for the 1938 New Zealand general election
Electorate	Incumbent	Winner	Majority	Runner up
General electorates
Auckland Central	Bill Parry		6,181	Clifford Reid Dodd
Auckland East	Bill Schramm		2,626	Harry Tom Merritt
Auckland Suburbs	Rex Mason		4,862	Maxwell Stuart Walker
Auckland West	Michael Joseph Savage		8,007	John W. Kealy
Avon	Dan Sullivan		6,179	Hiram Hunter
Awarua	James Hargest		660	Joseph Albert Beck
Bay of Islands	Harold Rushworth	Charles Boswell	163	Harold Fisher Guy
Bay of Plenty	Gordon Hultquist		169	Bill Sullivan
Buller	Paddy Webb		6,144	Terry Maddison
Central Otago	William Bodkin		1,231	James McIndoe Mackay
Christchurch East	Tim Armstrong		7,179	Ken Armour
Christchurch North	Sidney Holland		492	Robert Macfarlane
Christchurch South	Ted Howard		5,995	Gladstone Ward
Clutha	James Roy		714	Herbert Kerr Edie
Dunedin Central	Peter Neilson		3,814	William John Meade
Dunedin North	Jim Munro		3,557	Alexander Smith Falconer
Dunedin South	Fred Jones		4,314	Rev. Ernest Aderman
Dunedin West	Dr Gervan McMillan		2,639	Stuart Sidey
Eden	Bill Anderton		2,333	Donald Pool
Egmont	Charles Wilkinson		1,402	Thomas Trask
Franklin	Arthur Sexton	Jack Massey	2,057	Ernest Piggott
Gisborne	David Coleman		3,640	Kenneth Jones
Grey Lynn	John A. Lee		8,607	Joseph Alexander Govan
Hamilton	Charles Barrell		1,860	Albert William Grant
Hauraki	Robert Coulter	John Manchester Allen	1,188	Robert Coulter
Hawkes Bay	Ted Cullen		2,658	George Maddison
Hurunui	George Forbes		535	Harold Denton
Hutt	Walter Nash		6,814	Jack Andrews
Invercargill	William Denham		2,156	Fred Hall-Jones
Kaiapoi	Morgan Williams		1,535	George Warren
Kaipara	Gordon Coates		1,689	Percy MacGregor Stewart
Lyttelton	Terry McCombs		2,984	Isaac Wilson
Manawatu	Lorrie Hunter	John Cobbe	1,644	Lorrie Hunter
Marlborough	New electorate	Ted Meachen	1,525	Edward Healy
Marsden	Jim Barclay		557	Alfred Murdoch
Masterton	John Robertson		190	Jack Irving
Mataura	David McDougall	Tom Macdonald	1,515	David McDougall
Mid-Canterbury	Horace Herring	Arthur Grigg	74	Horace Herring
Motueka	Keith Holyoake	Jerry Skinner	870	Keith Holyoake
Napier	Bill Barnard		3,937	John Ormond
Nelson	Harry Atmore		886	John Robert Kerr
New Plymouth	Sydney George Smith	Fred Frost	869	Sydney George Smith
Oamaru	Arnold Nordmeyer		758	Frank Cooney
Onehunga	New electorate	Arthur Osborne	4,314	John Park
Otahuhu	New electorate	Charles Robert Petrie	2,267	Kenneth Tennent
Otaki	Leonard Lowry		1,367	George Alexander Monk
Pahiatua	Alfred Ransom		931	George Anders Hansen
Palmerston North	Joe Hodgens		2,118	Jimmy Nash
Patea	Harold Dickie		809	Charles Joseph Duggan
Raglan	Lee Martin		604	Andy Sutherland
Rangitikei	Ormond Wilson	Edward Gordon	311	Ormond Wilson
Remuera	New electorate	Bill Endean	2,861	Mary Dreaver
Riccarton	Bert Kyle		87	Bert Langford
Roskill	Arthur Shapton Richards		2,141	Arthur Sagar Bailey
Rotorua	Alexander Moncur		1,648	Henry William Nixon
Stratford	William Polson		1,101	James Watson McMillan
Tauranga	Charles Burnett	Frederick Doidge	1,138	Charles Burnett
Temuka	Thomas Burnett		1,249	James Arnold Kearton
Thames	Jim Thorn		2,295	William Alexander Clark
Timaru	Clyde Carr		2,196	W H Hall
Waikato	Robert Coulter	Stan Goosman	2,928	J W Neate
Waimarino	Frank Langstone		2,940	Cecil Boles
Waipawa	Max Christie	Albert Jull	446	Max Christie
Wairarapa	Ben Roberts		777	James Frederick Thompson
Waitaki	David Barnes	David Campbell Kidd	14	David Barnes
Waitemata	Jack Lyon		2,261	John Ernest Close
Waitomo	Walter Broadfoot		329	Jack Jones
Wallace	Adam Hamilton		844	John James Lynch
Wanganui	Joe Cotterill		3,920	Henry Charles Veitch
Wellington Central	Peter Fraser		3,837	Will Appleton
Wellington East	Bob Semple		4,736	William Long Barker
Wellington North	Charles Chapman		3,278	Elizabeth Gilmer
Wellington South	Robert McKeen		6,415	David Howlett
Wellington Suburbs	Robert Wright	Harry Combs	3,163	Ossie Mazengarb
Wellington West	New electorate	Catherine Stewart	956	Robert Wright
Westland	James O'Brien		3,729	Ted Taylor
Māori electorates
Eastern Maori	Āpirana Ngata		1,064	Rēweti Kōhere
Northern Maori	Taurekareka Henare	Paraire Karaka Paikea	2,011	Taurekareka Henare
Southern Maori	Eruera Tirikatene		485	Thomas Kaiporohu Bragg
Western Maori	Toko Ratana		4,267	Pei Te Hurinui Jones

== Other sources ==
- Gustafson, Barry (1986). The First 50 Years : A History of the New Zealand National Party. Auckland: Reed Methuen. ISBN 0-474-00177-6.
- Lipson, Leslie (2011) [1948]. The Politics of Equality: New Zealand's Adventures in Democracy. Wellington: Victoria University Press. ISBN 978-0-86473-646-8.
- Scholefield, Guy (1950) [First published in 1913]. New Zealand Parliamentary Record, 1840–1949 (3rd ed.). Wellington: Govt. Printer.
- Wilson, Jim (1985) [First published in 1913]. New Zealand Parliamentary Record, 1840–1984 (4th ed.). Wellington: V.R. Ward, Govt. Printer. OCLC 154283103.
