= Mid-Canterbury (electorate) =

Mid-Canterbury was a New Zealand parliamentary electorate in rural Canterbury. It existed from 1928 to 1946 and was represented by six Members of Parliament, including Mary Grigg, the first woman National Party MP.

== Population centres ==
In the 1927 electoral redistribution, the North Island gained a further electorate from the South Island due to fast population growth. Five electorates were abolished, two former electorates were re-established, and three electorates, including Mid-Canterbury, were created for the first time. These changes came into effect with the 1928 election.

== History ==
The electorate existed from 1928 to 1946. David Jones was the first representative, winning the 1928 election by a wafer-thin majority of 55 votes (0.59%) against Jeremiah Connolly; he had previously held Kaiapoi and Ellesmere. Jones was defeated by Connolly in the 1931 election. Connolly died on 2 October 1935 and as this was only weeks prior to the 1935 election, the seat remained vacant and no by-election was called.

Horace Herring of the Labour Party won the 1935 election. At the next election in 1938, Herring was narrowly beaten by Arthur Grigg of the National Party. Grigg enlisted in the NZEF as a Major in World War II, and was killed in action in Libya on 29 November 1941. He was succeeded by his widow Mary Grigg at a 1942 by-election; she became the first woman National MP. But in June 1943 she remarried, to another National MP, William Polson, and resigned.

Mary Grigg was succeeded by Geoff Gerard at the 1943 general election. He served until the end of the term in 1946 when the electorate was abolished, and successfully stood in the Ashburton electorate instead.

== Members of Parliament ==
Key

Reform Independent Liberal Labour National

Election	Winner
1928 election	David Jones
1931 election	Jeremiah Connolly
1935 election	Horace Herring
1938 election	Arthur Grigg
1942 by-election	Mary Grigg
1943 election	Geoff Gerard
(Electorate abolished in 1946; see Ashburton)

== Election results ==
=== 1943 election ===
1943 general election: Mid-Canterbury
Party	Candidate	Votes	%	±%
National	Geoff Gerard	5,552	50.75	
Labour	David Barnes	4,918	44.96	
Democratic Labour	Harry Bates	376	3.43	
Informal votes		92	0.84	+0.54
Majority		634	5.79	
Turnout		10,938	93.18	−1.95
Registered electors		11,738		

=== 1942 by-election ===
1942 Mid-Canterbury by-election: Mid-Canterbury
Party	Candidate	Votes	%	±%
National	Mary Grigg	unopposed		

=== 1938 election ===
1938 general election: Mid-Canterbury
Party	Candidate	Votes	%	±%
National	Arthur Grigg	5,504	50.18	
Labour	Horace Herring	5,430	49.50	+6.33
Informal votes		34	0.30	−0.18
Majority		74	0.67	
Turnout		10,968	95.13	+1.30
Registered electors		11,529		

=== 1935 election ===
1935 general election: Mid-Canterbury
Party	Candidate	Votes	%	±%
Labour	Horace Herring	4,422	43.17	
Reform	James Carr	3,960	38.66	
Democrat	William Woods	1,861	18.16	
Informal votes		50	0.48	−0.23
Majority		462	4.51	
Turnout		10,243	93.83	+4.71
Registered electors		10,916		

=== 1931 election ===
1931 general election: Mid-Canterbury
Party	Candidate	Votes	%	±%
Independent Liberal	Jeremiah Connolly	4,437	47.68	+3.51
Reform	David Jones	4,137	44.17	+2.63
Independent Labour	Hiram Hunter	310	3.33	
Independent	Robert Wallace Wightman	258	2.77	+0.19
Informal votes		67	0.71	+0.16
Majority		136	1.46	+0.87
Turnout		9,373	89.12	−3.48
Registered electors		10,517		

=== 1928 election ===
1928 general election: Mid-Canterbury
Party	Candidate	Votes	%	±%
Reform	David Jones	4,137	44.17	
United	Jeremiah Connolly	4,082	43.58	
Labour	Morgan Williams	905	9.66	
Independent	Robert Wallace Wightman	242	2.58	
Informal votes		52	0.55	
Majority		55	0.59	
Turnout		9,418	92.61	
Registered electors		10,170		
