= 1944 Christchurch mayoral election =

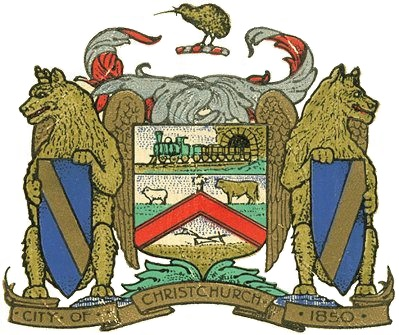
- 27 May 1944
- Turnout: 36,754
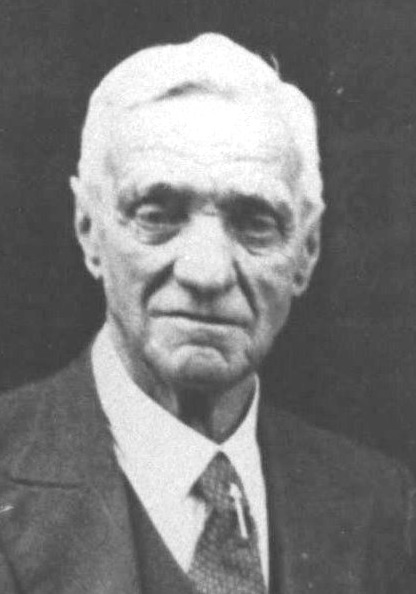

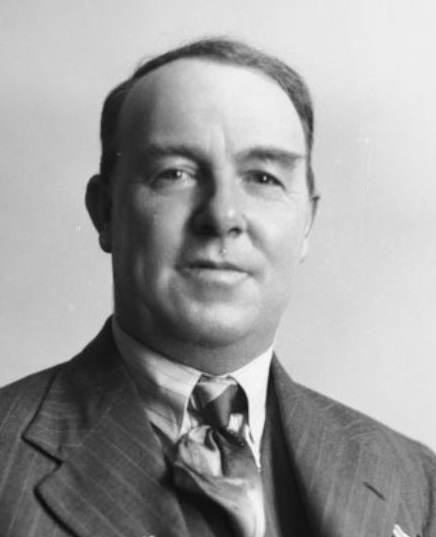
Candidate	Ernest Andrews	Robert Macfarlane
Party	Citizens'	Labour
Popular vote	22,765	13,702
Percentage	62.43	37.57
Mayor before election
Ernest Andrews
Citizens'
Elected mayor
Ernest Andrews
Citizens'

The 1944 Christchurch City mayoral election was held on 27 May. The incumbent was Ernest Andrews of the conservative Citizens' Association. Andrews was challenged by his predecessor, Robert Macfarlane, of the Labour Party, who had returned from active war service. Andrews won by a large majority.

== Background ==
Andrews was the only person who sought nomination from the Citizens' Association. His candidacy for the group was decided on 17 February 1944.

Macfarlane had been the mayor from 1938 to 1941, and had not stood in the previous election as he wanted to go to war. He was discharged from the army after serving in the Middle East for two and a half years due to ill health. When Andrews' nomination was announced, the local newspaper The Press stated that the Labour Party had yet to make its selection, but that "it is said to be certain" that Macfarlane would be their candidate. Three Labour candidates sought nomination: Macfarlane (who had been MP for Christchurch South since a 1939 by-election), Mabel Howard (who had become MP for Christchurch East in a 1943 by-election, and Harold Denton (an unsuccessful candidate in the Riccarton electorate in the 1943 general election). Macfarlane's selection was announced on 17 March 1944.

== Candidates ==
=== Ernest Andrews ===
Ernest Herbert Andrews was a senior city councillor whose candidacy was announced on 17 February 1944. Andrews had been born in 1873 near Nelson. He had studied at Canterbury University College and had been a school teacher in various parts of the country before settling in Christchurch with a printing business in 1907. A representative cricketer, he was involved with numerous organisations. He had continuously been a member of Christchurch City Council since 1919, had chaired almost every council committee, and had been deputy-mayor under John Beanland (1936–1938). He had first stood for mayor in the 1941 local election and was the incumbent.

=== Robert Macfarlane ===
Macfarlane was born in Christchurch in 1900. Raised by his grandmother, he attended Waltham School and may have had two years of high school. He worked in various labour job. In 1918, he joined the Christchurch Socialist Party and became its president shortly after. In 1919, he joined the Christchurch South branch of the Labour Party. When the Christchurch East branch of the Labour Party was founding in 1922, Macfarlane became its inaugural secretary. In 1925, he became secretary of the North Canterbury Labour Representation Committee. He was first elected onto Christchurch City Council in 1927 but failed to get re-elected in 1929. In the 1935 general election, he stood in the Christchurch North electorate and got narrowly beaten by Sidney Holland. He regained a seat on Christchurch City Council in a by-election in 1936. He was Mayor of Christchurch from 1938 to 1941, and had continuously represented the Christchurch South since 1939 despite his lengthy absence due to war service.

== Results ==
The election was held on Saturday, 27 May 1944, from 9 a.m. to 6 p.m. For the first time, enrolment had become compulsory, although voting itself was not compulsory (as it remains to this day). There were five separate elections for Christchurch people: mayor (2 candidates), city council (46 candidates for 16 positions), the North Canterbury Hospital Board (27 candidates for 10 positions), and the Lyttelton Harbour Board (9 candidates for 4 positions), and the North Canterbury Catchment Board (newly constituted; 9 candidates for 4 positions). The first-past-the-post voting system was used and absentee voting was not allowed for. There were 23 polling booths in Christchurch Central and Richmond, 23 polling booths across Linwood, Woolston, and Mount Pleasant, 26 polling booths across St Albans and Papanui, 31 polling booths across Sydenham and Spreydon, 1 polling booth in Lyttelton, and 6 polling booths in New Brighton; a total of 110 booths. In addition, there were a total of 8 polling booths in Riccarton and Sumner for the North Canterbury Catchment Board election.

Andrews had a significant majority, getting 22,765 votes compared to Macfarlane's 13,702. The last time there had been such a clear majority was at the 1925 mayoral election. The turnout for the mayoral election was circa 46.4 percent.

=== Mayoral election results ===
1944 Christchurch mayoral election
Party	Candidate	Votes	%	±%
Citizens'	Ernest Andrews	22,765	62.43	+18.46
Labour	Robert Macfarlane	13,702	37.57	
Informal votes		287	0.78	
Majority		9,063	24.85	+20.99
Turnout		36,754	c. 46.4	

Andrews was installed on 7 June 1944 at a ceremony held at the municipal offices in Manchester Street, with councillor Melville Lyons chosen as his deputy.

=== City councillor election results ===
In mid-May 1944, the Electors' Association formed itself as a body for independent candidates. The election saw the Labour Party gain just one seat on the city council, with three of their sitting members (John Septimus "Jack" Barnett, Teresa Green, and Harold Denton) defeated. Four councillors for the Citizens' Association were elected for the first time (James Hay, Leslie George Amos, Ron Guthrey, and John Edward Tait).

In the table below the final voting numbers reported as final are shown. The last six placing candidates lost their NZ£3 deposit.

1944 Christchurch local election
Party	Candidate	Votes	%	±%
Citizens'	James Hay	19,933	61.58	
Citizens'	Melville Lyons	19,516	60.29	−0.95
Citizens'	Ron Guthrey	18,967	58.59	
Citizens'	Mary McLean	18,656	57.63	+6.38
Citizens'	Jim Clarke	17,953	55.46	−3.07
Citizens'	Leslie George Amos	17,545	54.20	
Citizens'	Bill Glue	17,369	53.66	+3.73
Citizens'	Reginald Gilbert Brown	17,211	53.17	+0.39
Citizens'	Clyde Sheppard	17,027	52.60	+2.43
Citizens'	Frank Sturmer Wilding	16,880	52.15	−5.71
Labour	George Manning	16,574	51.20	−4.10
Citizens'	John Edward Tait	16,464	50.86	
Citizens'	John James Hurley	16,333	50.46	−1.55
Citizens'	Hugh Paterson Donald	16,281	50.29	−0.55
Citizens'	Walter Llewellyn King	16,054	49.59	
Citizens'	George Griffiths	15,973	49.34	+0.59
Labour	Jack Barnett	15,957	49.29	−11.37
Citizens'	Donald Sinclair Murchison	15,637	48.31	
Labour	Mabel Howard	15,608	48.22	+1.58
Labour	Teresa Green	15,536	47.99	−2.39
Labour	Edward Parlane	15,034	46.44	
Labour	Harold Denton	14,824	45.79	−6.21
Labour	Lyn Christie	13,086	40.42	
Labour	Thomas Nuttall	12,923	39.92	−8.05
Labour	Ernest Alan Sharp	12,199	37.68	−6.31
Labour	John Edward Jones	12,140	37.50	−7.49
Labour	George William Dell	11,973	36.99	
Labour	James Shankland	11,321	34.97	
Labour	James William Morgan	11,066	34.18	
Labour	Tommy Martin	10,479	32.37	−5.10
Labour	Frederick Kelso	10,358	32.00	−5.12
Labour	Patrick Joseph Kelly	8,761	27.06	
Independent	William Henry Davies	3,837	11.85	
Democratic Labour	Gordon Kelly	3,645	11.26	
Communist	William John Whiting	3,130	9.67	
Electors' Association	Fred Whiley	2,822	8.71	
Democratic Labour	David John Upton	2,670	8.24	
Electors' Association	Robert McKenzie Bailey	2,350	7.26	
Electors' Association	George Thomas Baker	2,239	6.91	
Democratic Labour	Henry Maloney	2,032	6.27	
Independent	Lynwood Hollings	1,941	5.99	−4.48
Electors' Association	Vincent Francis Roberts	1,882	5.81	
Democratic Labour	Trevor Roland Hill	1,825	5.63	
Democratic Labour	John Ranby Robertson	1,558	4.81	
Democratic Labour	Morris Sears	1,084	3.34	
Electors' Association	Ernest Yealands	1,041	3.21	
