= 1941 Christchurch mayoral election =

Local election in New Zealand

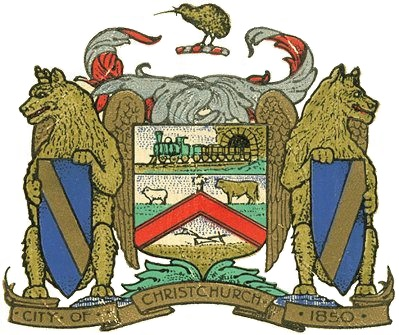
- 17 May 1941
- Turnout: 30,846
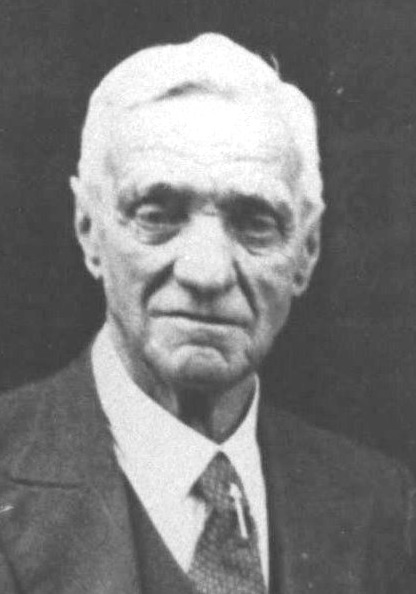

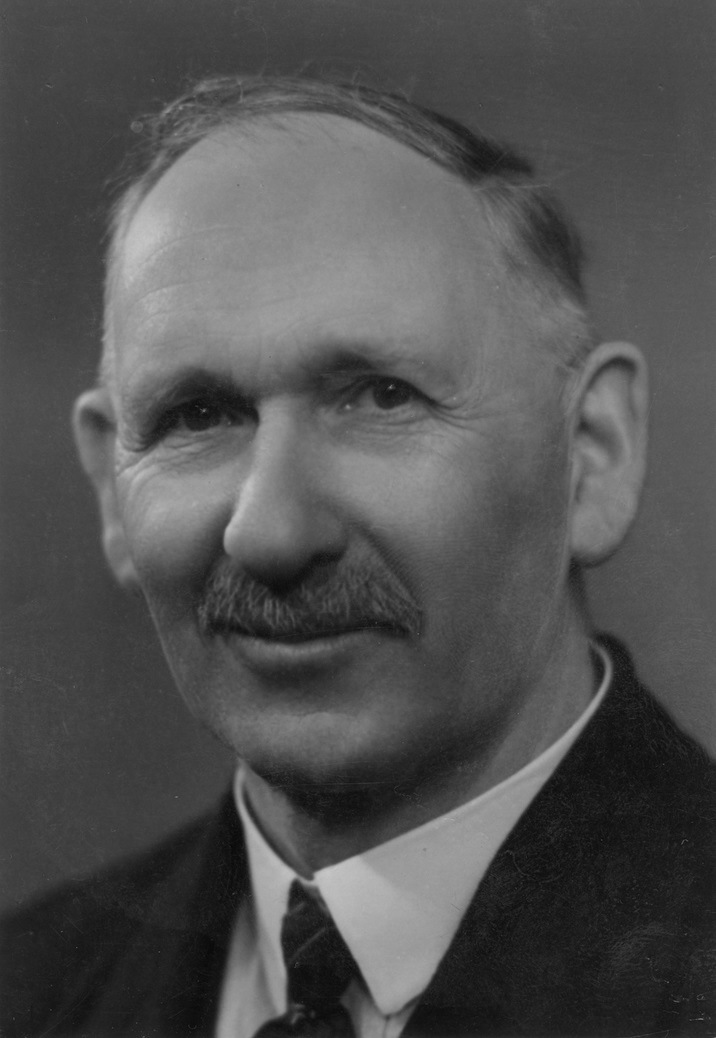

Candidate	Ernest Andrews	Edward Parlane	John Keith Moloney
Party	Citizens'	Labour	Independent
Popular vote	13,563	12,371	4,672
Percentage	43.97	40.11	15.15
Mayor before election
Robert Macfarlane
Labour
Elected mayor
Ernest Andrews
Citizens'

The 1941 Christchurch City mayoral election was held on 17 May. The incumbent, Robert Macfarlane of the Labour Party, did not stand for re-election as he wanted to serve in WWII. Four candidates stood and Ernest Andrews of the conservative Citizens' Association was successful. Andrews was installed on 28 May 1941.

== Background ==
The 1938 Christchurch mayoral election had been won by Robert Macfarlane of the Labour Party, beating John Guthrie of the conservative-leaning Citizens' Association. The city council was made up of 11 Labour members and 5 from the Citizens' Association, which gave the Labour Party a strong majority.

Macfarlane was a strong proponent of war service and was determined to serve himself. He started military training in Burnham in January 1941. When the Christchurch Labour Representation Committee met on 20 February 1941 to elect the candidates for the upcoming local elections on 20 February, Macfarlane announced his retirement from the mayoralty.

Ernest Andrews' candidacy was announced on 5 December 1940. Andrews was a senior councillor with long service and a member of the conservative-leaning Citizens' Association. Andrews responded to a request by a large deputation. His candidacy came outside of the normal Citizens' Association process where several candidates would go through a nomination process. It took until 18 February 1941 before Andrews was confirmed as the official candidate of the Citizens' Association.

== Candidates ==
=== Ernest Andrews ===
Ernest Herbert Andrews was a senior city councillor whose candidacy was announced on 5 December 1940. Andrews had been born in 1873 near Nelson. He had studied at Canterbury University College and had been a school teacher in various parts of the country before settling in Christchurch with a printing business in 1907. A representative cricketer, he was involved with numerous organisations. He had continuously been a member of Christchurch City Council since 1919, had chaired almost every council committee, and had been deputy-mayor under John Beanland (1936–1938).

=== John Moloney ===
John Keith Moloney, a barrister in Christchurch, announced his candidacy on 5 March. Originally from Dunedin, he had come to Christchurch in the mid-1890s and had been there since with the exception of WWI. He had not previously been on the city council. Moloney had set up and was leading a group called "Win the War". He had been the president of the Canterbury Rugby Union since 1938. He advocated for the amalgamation of various local bodies plus organisations like the Drainage Board, the Fire Board, the Tramway Board, to be administered by Christchurch City Council.

=== Edward Parlane ===
The Labour Party candidacy for the mayoralty was first discussed in The Press in December 1940, with the party's preference that a new mayor be elected as opposed to the deputy mayor taking the leadership position if the incumbent, Macfarlane, were to leave the country on war service for an indeterminate length of time. At that point, John Septimus "Jack" Barnett (the present deputy mayor) and Edward Parlane were given as the most likely candidates. Parlane was chosen at the Christchurch Labour Representation Committee meeting on 20 February 1941.

Parlane was born in Rangiora in 1874. He received his education at East Oxford primary school, where he then did farming until age 20 followed by some years of farming in the North Island. He returned to Rangiora and became involved in unions; first the Flourmillers' Union and then the Canterbury Timber Workers' Union in Christchurch. In 1923, he became the secretary of the Timber Workers' Union and still held the position in 1941, as well as secretary of the Canterbury Drivers' Union. He was on the board of Christchurch West High School and was one of the founders of the Addington public library; he served as the library's president for 10 years. He was first elected onto Christchurch City Council in 1929 and lived in Addington's Cotterill Street. His elder brother, Andrew Parlane (born 1869), was elected onto Wellington City Council in 1936.

=== Charles Thomas Rodda ===
Charles Thomas Rodda was born on 31 December 1871 in Victoria, Australia. He announced his candidacy on nomination day: 6 May 1941. Rodda was self-employed as a painter and paperhanger. Rodda campaigned that New Brighton be connected to the Christchurch sewerage system, and that the Lyttelton road tunnel and a Christchurch Town Hall be built.

== Results ==
The election was held on Saturday, 17 May 1941, from 9 am to 6 pm. This was a change from previous elections which had been held on Wednesdays, from 9 am to 7 pm. The first-past-the-post voting system was used. There were 24 polling booths in Christchurch Central and Richmond, 21 polling booths across Linwood and Woolston, 28 polling booths across St Albans and Papanui, 36 polling booths across Sydenham and Spreydon, 1 polling booth in Lyttelton, and 6 polling booths in New Brighton; a total of 116 booths. Huntsbury and the borough of New Brighton had joined with Christchurch city on 1 April 1941 and polling booths for a Christchurch election were in those areas for the first time.

There were four different bodies elected that day. Apart from the mayoralty, people voted for 16 city councillors (33 candidates), 10 hospital board representatives (22 candidates), and 4 Lyttelton Harbour Board representatives (8 candidates). In addition, the Christchurch Tramway District held elections on that day but while many of the polling booths were the same as for the other elections, this was separately organised.

The election had a poor turnout, much reduced from the 1938 election despite a much larger roll due to the Borough of New Brighton having been added to the city since. Jack Roberts, the president of the Christchurch Labour Representation Committee, lamented that worker apathy had cost his party the election.

=== Mayoral election results ===
1941 Christchurch mayoral election
Party	Candidate	Votes	%	±%
Citizens'	Ernest Andrews	13,563	43.97	
Labour	Edward Parlane	12,371	40.11	
Independent	John Keith Moloney	4,672	15.15	
Independent	Charles Thomas Rodda	240	0.78	
Majority		1,192	3.86	
Turnout		30,846		

Andrews was installed on 28 May 1941 at a ceremony held at the municipal offices in Manchester Street.

=== City councillor election results ===
1941 Christchurch City Council election
Party	Candidate	Votes	%	±%
Citizens'	Thomas Milliken	17,962	65.90	+20.48
Citizens'	Melville Lyons	16,692	61.24	+15.81
Labour	Jack Barnett	16,534	60.66	+3.18
Citizens'	Jim Clarke	15,953	58.53	
Citizens'	Frank Sturmer Wilding	15,772	57.86	
Labour	George Manning	15,074	55.30	−1.24
Citizens'	Mark Kershaw	14,393	52.80	
Citizens'	Reginald Gilbert Brown	14,386	52.78	
Citizens'	John James Hurley	14,176	52.01	
Labour	Harold Denton	14,174	52.00	+1.20
Citizens'	Mary McLean	13,970	51.25	
Citizens'	Hugh Paterson Donald	13,857	50.84	
Citizens'	Samuel Harvey Maddren	13,852	50.82	
Labour	Teresa Green	13,732	50.38	
Citizens'	Clyde Sheppard	13,674	50.17	
Citizens'	Bill Glue	13,610	49.93	
Citizens'	George Griffiths	13,219	48.50	
Labour	Thomas Nuttall	13,076	47.97	−0.80
Labour	Mabel Howard	12,713	46.64	−3.78
Citizens'	Fred Whiley	12,663	46.46	
Labour	John Edward Jones	12,263	44.99	−2.57
Labour	Ernest Alan Sharp	11,990	43.99	−2.69
Labour	Louisa Macfarlane	11,522	42.27	
Labour	Reg Jones	11,158	40.93	−4.04
Labour	Archie Grant	11,113	40.77	
Labour	Margaret Annie Denton	11,046	40.52	
Labour	Tommy Martin	10,213	37.47	
Labour	Frederick Kelso	10,118	37.12	−5.57
Labour	Rosina Stuart Trevella	9,247	33.92	
Independent	Charles Seymour Trillo	5,146	18.88	
Independent	Percy Samuel Turnbull	4,990	18.30	
Communist	Jack Locke	2,926	10.73	
Independent	Lynwood Hollings	2,856	10.47	

External image
- Andrews and the mayoress Eveleyn Couzins

Andrews was a widower and his late wife's niece, Eveleyn Couzins, acted as mayoress. Andrews remained mayor until his retirement in 1950. Couzins died in 1945 and his daughter Gwendoline took on the role as mayoress.
