= 1943 Christchurch East by-election =

New Zealand by-election

- 6 February 1943
- Turnout: 9,644 (65.01%)
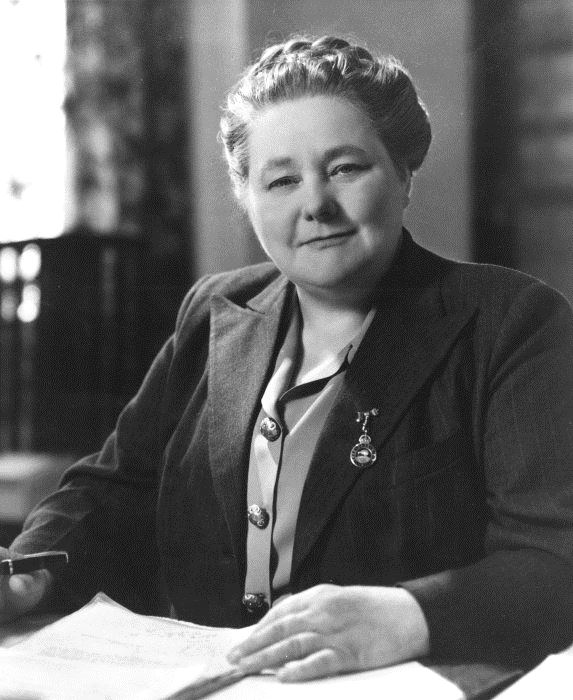

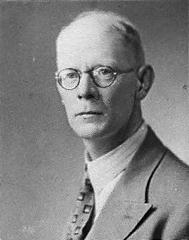

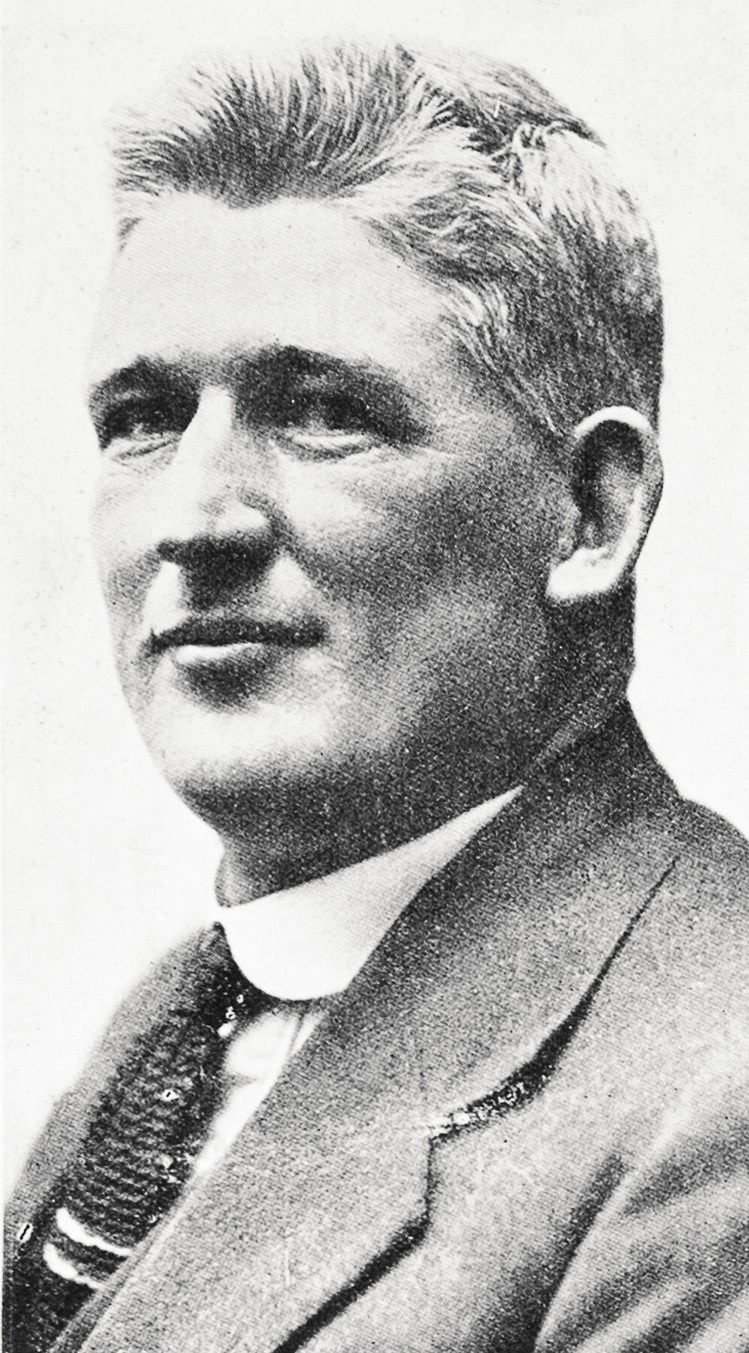
| Candidate | Mabel Howard | Horace Herring | Melville Lyons |
| Party | Labour | Democratic Labour | National |
| Popular vote | 4,559 | 2,578 | 2,371 |
| Percentage | 47.27% | 26.73% | 24.59% |
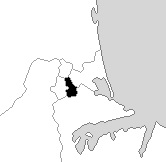
- Christchurch East electorate boundaries used for the by-election
MP before election
Tim Armstrong
Labour
Elected MP
Mabel Howard
Labour

The 1943 Christchurch East by-election held on 6 February was caused by the death of Tim Armstrong during the term of the 26th New Zealand Parliament. The by-election in the Christchurch East electorate was contested by five candidates, including representatives from the Labour Party, the Labour breakaway party Democratic Labour Party and the National Party. The election was won by the Labour candidate, Mabel Howard, and started her long parliamentary career, which included her becoming the first female cabinet minister in 1947.

== Background and candidates ==
Tim Armstrong was first elected to Parliament in the Christchurch East electorate in the 1922 general election and held the electorate for Labour until his death. The by-election in this Labour stronghold attracted five candidates.

Mabel Howard, the daughter of former member of parliament Ted Howard, had wanted to follow her father in the 1939 Christchurch South by-election caused by his death, but although she was the favoured candidate by the local branch of the party, the Labour Party hierarchy chose Robert Macfarlane instead. Howard believed that back then, she was opposed due to her connections to John A. Lee, who was seen as a radical within the party. But for the 1943 by-election in the Christchurch East electorate, Mabel Howard was nominated by the Labour Party.

Lee had been expelled from the Labour Party in 1940 and had immediately set up a splinter party that he called Democratic Labour Party (DLP). Horace Herring stood for the DLP and it was expected that this would split the Labour vote.

Owen McKee was a union delegate from South Canterbury. A former vice-president of the General Labourers' Union in Timaru, he was seen as running a personal campaign against Howard over a difference of opinion. His candidacy was not seen as serious.

Melville Lyons was the candidate put forward by the National Party. A seasoned political campaigner, Lyons had briefly been elected to Parliament in 1925 for the Lyttelton electorate before his election was declared void. At the time, he was Deputy-Mayor of Christchurch. In conjunction with the split vote caused by the DLP, Lyons was expected to be a threat to Labour.

The last candidate, Lincoln Efford, was a peace advocate and was not taken seriously.

== Results ==
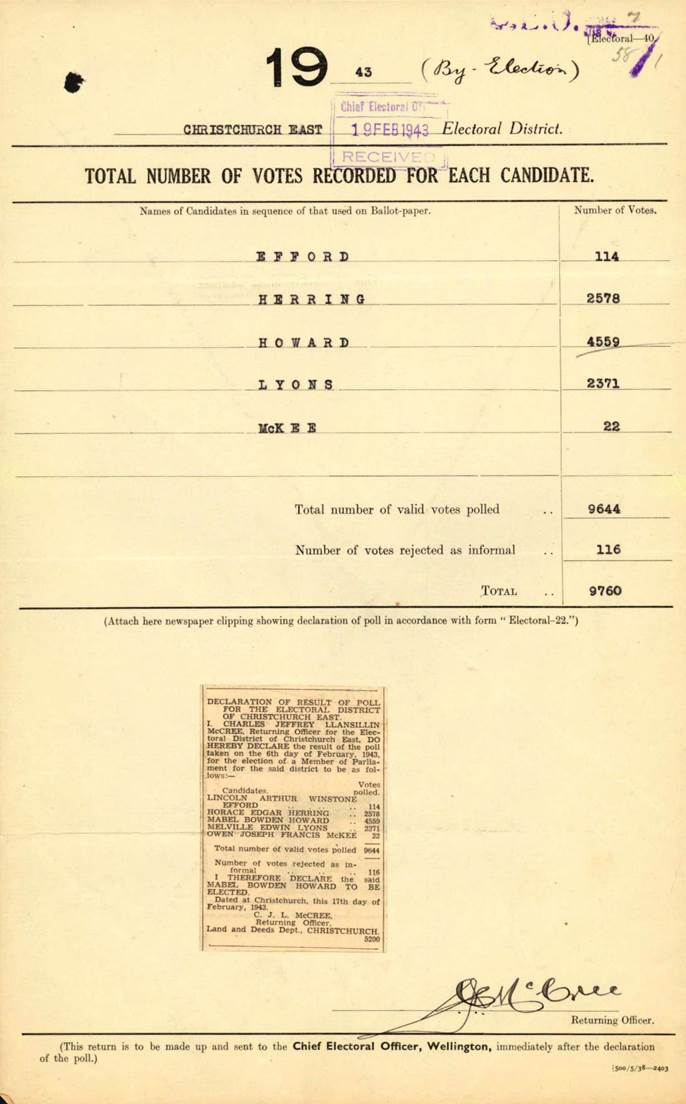
Official record from the Electoral Department.

There were 15,330 voters registered in the Christchurch East electorate for the 1938 general election held on 15 October. Results of the Christchurch East general election were:

Christchurch East general election, 1938
| Party | Candidate | Votes | % | ±% |
|---|---|---|---|---|
| Labour | Tim Armstrong | 10,561 | 75.74 | +2.25 |
| National | Ken Armour | 3,382 | 24.26 | +1.49 |
| Majority | | 7,179 | 51.49 | +0.76 |
| Informal votes | | 73 | 0.52 | −0.61 |
| Registered electors | | 15,330 | | |
| Turnout | | 14,016 | 91.43 | |

There were 14,835 people on the electoral roll, of which 9,644 voted in the 6 February 1943 by-election. The individual results were:

1943 Christchurch East by-election
| Party | Candidate | Votes | % | ±% |
|---|---|---|---|---|
| Labour | Mabel Howard | 4,559 | 47.27 | −28.47 |
| Democratic Labour | Horace Herring | 2,578 | 26.73 | |
| National | Melville Lyons | 2,371 | 24.59 | +0.33 |
| Independent | Lincoln Efford | 114 | 1.18 | |
| Independent | Owen McKee | 22 | 0.23 | |
| Majority | | 1,981 | 20.54 | −30.95 |
| Registered electors | | 14,835 | | |
| Turnout | | 9,644 | 65.01 | −26.42 |

As it had been predicted, the Labour vote was split between Howard and Herring. The National vote was practically unchanged compared to the 1938 general election. With Labour's substantial majority in 1938, even the split vote gained Howard a comfortable win, with Herring (DLP) coming second and Lyons (National) coming third. The two remaining candidates had marginal returns. Howard was the fourth woman to be represented in the New Zealand Parliament, and the fifth woman overall. It started Howard's long parliamentary career, which lasted until 1969 when she retired. She was to become the first woman cabinet minister (as Minister of Health in 1947–1949) in New Zealand.
