= Melville Lyons =

New Zealand politician (1889–1955)

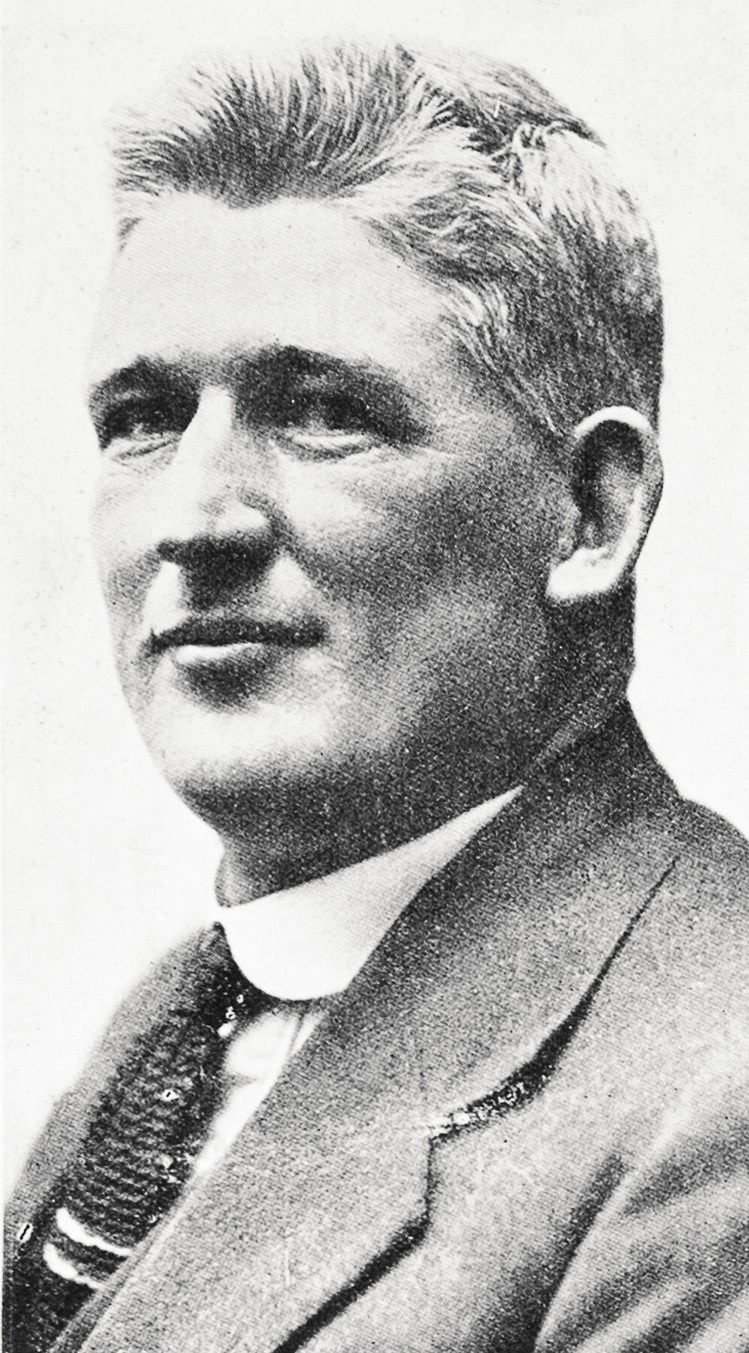
Melville Lyons in 1930

Melville Edwin Lyons OBE (27 February 1889 – 7 May 1955), sometimes called Tiny, was briefly a Reform Party Member of Parliament in New Zealand until his election was declared void. A journalist by trade, he became involved in local politics in Christchurch after having served in WWI. He was Deputy Mayor of Christchurch for six years under mayor Ernest Andrews.

== Early life ==
Lyons was born on 27 February 1889 (note that his birth certificate appears under the date 27 March 1889) in Masterton. His parents were Thomas Adian Lyons, an overseer at a sheep station and later a shepherd, and Mary Lyons (née McIver). His parents had married on 6 March 1880 in Timaru and siblings of Melville Lyons were Joseph James (born 18 May 1881 in Burkes Pass), Esther (born 1883 in Opiki near Timaru), Ethel Mary, Idalia (born 4 July 1887) and Seafield. The family moved to the Masterton area in about 1884. After the last child was born, his father returned to Australia and nothing was heard of him again.

Melville Lyons attended the District High School in Feilding. Before WWI, Lyons was an agricultural editor. He worked for the Dannevirke Advocate and then for the Christchurch Sun. He left for Egypt via Sydney from Wellington on 13 July 1916 as a trooper to enter the war, part of the New Zealand Expeditionary Force in the 15th Reinforcements Veterinary Corps. At 6 feet 2 inches (1.88 m), he was a tall man and "well-fleshed" (at age 26, he weighed 217 pounds (98 kg)) and had been given the ironic nickname 'Tiny'.

== Political career ==
=== Parliament ===
New Zealand Parliament
Years	Term	Electorate	Party
1925–1926	22nd	Lyttelton	Reform

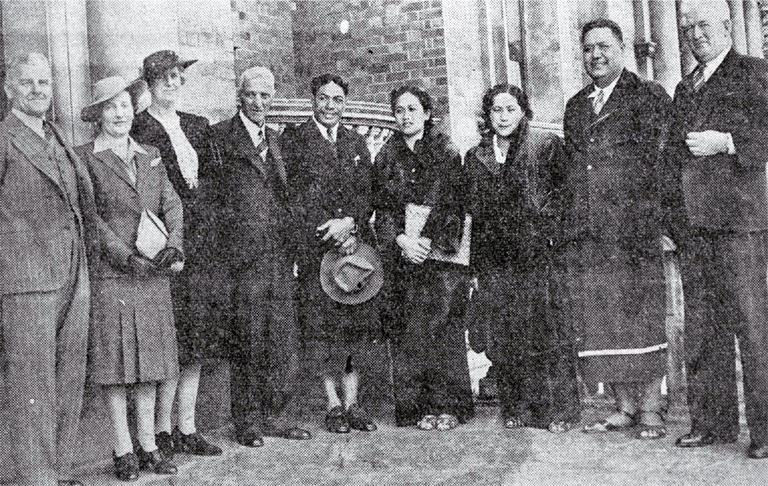
Samoan high chiefs Tupua Tamasese Meaʻole (fifth from left) and Malietoa Tanumafili II (second from right) welcomed to Christchurch in 1945 by Mayor Ernest Andrews (fourth from left) and Deputy-Mayor Melville Lyons (right)

He was elected in the Lyttelton electorate in the 1925 general election. The original count resulted in a tie of 4,900 votes to Lyons and James McCombs each. The returning officer gave his casting vote to Lyons and declared him elected. A recount was demanded, and on 3 December 1925, an amended result of 4890 votes for Lyons and 4884 votes for McCombs was determined, with the differences in the counts explained by counting informal votes in a different way. Lyons' election was declared void on 13 March 1926, and the previous holder, McCombs, was restored as the holder of the electorate. The 22nd Parliament had its first sitting on 16 June 1926, hence Lyons had not been sworn in before his election was declared void.

Lyons next stood for Parliament in the 1935 Lyttelton by-election, caused by the death of Elizabeth McCombs who had succeeded her husband James. The by-election was contested by four candidates, and Lyons, representing the United–Reform Coalition, came a distant second against Terry McCombs, the son of Elizabeth McCombs.

1935 Lyttelton by-election
Party	Candidate	Votes	%	±%
Labour	Terry McCombs	5,437	58.65	
United/Reform	Melville Lyons	3,685	39.75	
Independent Labour	Edward Hills	103	1.11	
Independent	G.S. Hamilton	46	0.50	
Majority		1752	18.9	−6.75
Turnout		9,271	67.43	

Lyons was chosen as the candidate for the National Party in the 1938 election for the Mid-Canterbury electorate. His nomination was overturned, however, and Arthur Grigg was put forward instead, with Lyons withdrawing. Grigg was eventually successful in winning the electorate against the incumbent, Labour's Horace Herring.

The death of Ted Howard on 26 April 1939 caused the 3 June 1939 Christchurch South by-election. Since Howard's first election in the 1919 general election, Christchurch South was held by the Labour Party. At the last general election in 1938, Howard had polled 9,885 votes versus 3,890 votes for Gladstone Ward, the son of former Prime Minister Joseph Ward. The electorate was thus regarded as a safe seat for Labour.

On nomination day, two candidates were put forward: Robert Macfarlane for the Labour Party and Lyons for the National Party. Macfarlane had been Mayor of Christchurch since the previous year. Macfarlane and Lyons received 7,900 and 4,005 votes, respectively, a majority of 3,895 votes (32.72%) for Macfarlane. An editorial by The Evening Post argued that Lyons never had any hope of winning the election.

Lyons was selected by the National Party to contest the Kaiapoi electorate in the 1941 general election, but the general election was delayed until 1943 owing to WWII. When the 1943 general election did happen, W. H. Overton was the National Party candidate in the Kaiapoi electorate, coming second against the incumbent Morgan Williams.

1939 Christchurch South by-election
Party	Candidate	Votes	%	±%
Labour	Robert Macfarlane	7,900	66.36	
National	Melville Lyons	4,005	33.64	
Majority		3,895	32.72	−10.80
Turnout		11,905	76.36	

Early in 1943, Lyons was nominated by the National Party for the Christchurch East by-election held on 6 February caused by the death of Tim Armstrong. The by-election in the Christchurch East electorate, a Labour Party stronghold, was contested by five candidates, including representatives from the Labour Party and the Labour breakaway party Democratic Labour Party. The election was won by the Labour candidate, Mabel Howard (the daughter of Ted Howard), and started her long parliamentary career. Lyons came third in the election, beaten by both Labour candidates.

1943 Christchurch East by-election
Party	Candidate	Votes	%	±%
Labour	Mabel Howard	4,559	47.27	−28.47
Democratic Labour	Horace Herring	2,578	26.73	
National	Melville Lyons	2,371	24.59	+0.33
Independent	Lincoln Efford	114	1.18	
Independent	Owen McKee	22	0.23	
Majority		1,981	20.54	−30.95
Registered electors		14,835		
Turnout		9,644	65.01	−26.42

=== Local body ===
Lyons was first elected Councillor for Christchurch City Council in 1927 and served for a total of 20 years until 1947 as a member of the conservative Citizens' Association. He was Deputy-Mayor of Christchurch from 1941 to 1947, serving under mayor Ernest Andrews. In the 1947 Christchurch mayoral election, he challenged the incumbent Citizens' mayor, Andrews, as an independent, but came last of the three candidates.

In the 1953 Coronation Honours, Lyons was appointed an Officer of the Order of the British Empire, for services to local government and agriculture.

== Later life ==
Lyons was secretary of the Canterbury A&P Association. He died on 7 May 1955.

== Notes ==
New Zealand Parliament
Preceded by James McCombs	Member of Parliament for Lyttelton; 1925–1926	Succeeded by James McCombs
