= Gains Whiting =

New Zealand trade unionist and political activist

- Born: 1865; Christchurch, New Zealand
- Died: 1946 (aged 80–81)
- Organization: New Zealand Boot Trade Federation
- Known for: NZLP candidate for Christchurch South
- Political party: Independent Labour-ULP

Gains Whiting (1865–1946) was a New Zealand trade unionist and political activist.

== Political activity ==
Born in Christchurch, New Zealand, Whiting was Secretary of the New Zealand Boot Trade Federation. He later became President of the Canterbury Trades and Labour Council and Chairman of the Christchurch LRC.

Gains Whiting was the NZLP candidate for Christchurch South in 1911. A strong ally of Tom Paul he tried to keep the United Labour Party (ULP) active in Christchurch after the formation of the Social Democratic Party in 1913. Whiting stood as an independent Labour-ULP candidate for Christchurch South at the 1914 general election.

He died in 1946.
