= Ted Howard (politician) =

New Zealand politician

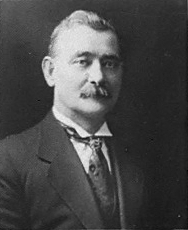

Member of the New Zealand Parliament for Christchurch South
- In office 17 December 1919 – 26 April 1939
- Preceded by: Harry Ell
- Succeeded by: Robert Macfarlane

Personal details
- Born: Edwin John Harney; 18 June 1868 Bristol, England
- Died: 26 April 1939 (aged 70) Christchurch, New Zealand
- Resting place: Bromley Cemetery
- Party: Labour; Socialist Party
- Spouse: Harriet Garard Goring (1889–1903†)
- Relations: Mabel Howard (daughter)
- Children: 3
- Profession: trade unionist

Ted Howard (18 June 1868 – 26 April 1939), born as Edwin John Harney, was a New Zealand politician of the Labour Party, and the father of cabinet minister Mabel Howard. He had been a prominent member of the New Zealand Socialist Party, a precursor to the Labour Party.

== Biography ==
=== Early life and career ===
Ted Howard was born as Edwin John Harney in Bristol, England, in 1868 to Edwin John Harney (a house painter) and his wife Sarah Ann Osgood who later ran a theatrical company. He was educated at Plymouth before leaving school at 16. He joined the Royal Navy as an ordinary seaman. He was married on 12 February 1889 in Christchurch, New Zealand, to Harriett Garard Goring. In March 1891 he jumped ship in Auckland and took the name Edwin John Howard before joining up again with Harriett in Australia. He then worked for several years as a miner in both South Australia and Western Australia, gaining considerable engineering experience during this period. They lived part of the time in Australia, and part of the time in New Zealand. His three daughters, Adelaide, Mabel and Elsie, were all born in Adelaide.

He worked at the Australian Smelting Company and became a foreman. At the Adelaide School of Mines, he studied chemistry.

When his wife died in the Adelaide suburb of Bowden in 1903, he came to New Zealand with his daughters according to her wishes. Soon after arriving he became involved in the trade union movement at a time when interest in socialism was beginning to grow. He was elected as organiser the Canterbury General Labourers' Union in 1908 and within three months he had signed up almost 400 new members, after two years almost all of Christchurch's labourers had joined the union. In collaboration with others, Howard had transformed unionism among the areas unskilled workers.

In 1910 Howard became a frequent contributor to the Maoriland Worker newspaper after it was purchased by the New Zealand Federation of Labour. The vast majority of his contributions were written under the pen-name 'The Vag'. He was particularly critical of imperialism, capitalism and militarism and thusly was staunchly opposed to World War I. He also wrote a children's column in the paper as 'Uncle Ted' where he encouraged pacifism in children. He was also chairman of the paper's board of directors from 1913 to 1915.

=== Political career ===
New Zealand Parliament
Years	Term	Electorate	Party
1919–1922	20th	Christchurch South	Labour
1922–1925	21st	Christchurch South	Labour
1925–1928	22nd	Christchurch South	Labour
1928–1931	23rd	Christchurch South	Labour
1931–1935	24th	Christchurch South	Labour
1935–1938	25th	Christchurch South	Labour
1938–1939	26th	Christchurch South	Labour

He was secretary of the Christchurch branch of the Independent Political Labour League from 1905 to 1908 before transferring his allegiance to the Socialist Party and was its national president in 1912. Howard stood for the Christchurch South electorate at the 1911 election, as the Socialist candidate, placing a distant third. His union organising with unions led him to political organising and in 1911 he helped secure the election of several labour candidates to the Christchurch City Council which lead to significant salary increases for civic employees in 1913. Howard organised relief for the families of men imprisoned for disobeying conscription. He was elected a member of the Christchurch City Council himself from 1917 to 1919 and again from 1923 to 1925.

Howard held many roles for various organisations. He was on the board of governors of Canterbury University College, on the board of the Christchurch Technical College, the board of the Lincoln Agricultural College, a member of the Lyttelton Harbour Board (including its chairman from 1934 to 1936), the Christchurch Domain Board and the Repatriation Board.

Howard stood for and was elected for the Christchurch South electorate at the 1919 election. In his maiden speech to parliament he outlined his philosophy "Every time that I get a chance from the public platform I preach to the workers one story, and one story only – have respect for yourselves, and demand that you shall have conferred on you just as much as the other fellow gets." Howard spoke most frequently on matters pertaining to education, wage arbitration and New Zealand's administration of its Pacific island territories. He was a perpetual advocate for the universal right to education. He was a member of the Workers' Educational Association (WEA), becoming its librarian in 1918, and was still educating himself via the WEA while an MP which helped him to contribute more to economic debates. From 1921 to 1926 he was Labour's junior whip.

In 1935, Howard was awarded the King George V Silver Jubilee Medal.

By the time Labour finally won government after the 1935 election, Howard was left out of the cabinet, particularly due to his failing health from high blood pressure. He was bitterly disappointed at his omission and left the caucus with tears streaming down his face. In consolation he was offered the post of Administrator of Western Samoa, but Howard declined feeling that resigning his seat to accept would betray the trust of his electorate. Instead, he accepted the position of Chairman of Committees from 1 April 1936 to 20 September 1938. Labour's victory had come too late for Howard, leading him to become an elder statesman of the party in his final years.

=== Death ===
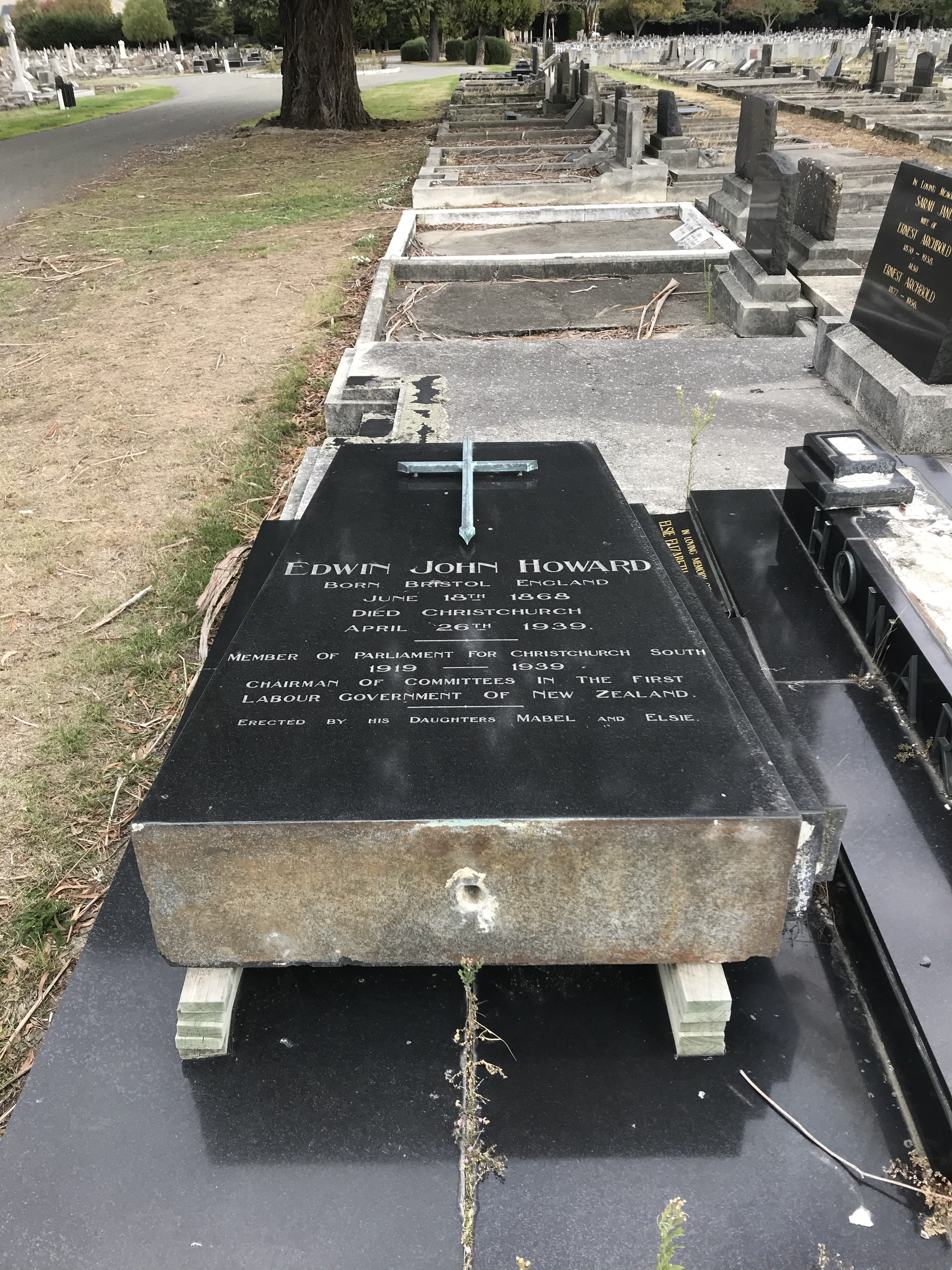
Howard family grave at Bromley Cemetery

Howard unexpectedly died on 26 April 1939, survived by two of his three daughters, and was buried at Bromley Cemetery. His surviving daughters, Elsie and Mabel, had a gravestone erected for him; at 6 feet (1.8 m) the tallest in the cemetery. The gravestone toppled over in the 2011 Christchurch earthquake.

His daughter Mabel Howard hoped to be nominated as Labour's candidate for the 1939 by-election. Despite having much local support, Labour chose Mayor of Christchurch Robert Macfarlane as their candidate. Eventually, Mabel was elected as a Member of Parliament for Christchurch East after a 1943 by-election, becoming the country's fifth female MP.

== Notes ==
Political offices
Preceded by Jimmy Nash	Chairman of Committees of the House of Representatives; 1936–1938	Succeeded by Robert McKeen
Preceded by William Glassey Gallagher	Chairman of the Lyttelton Harbour Board; 1934–1936	Succeeded by Walter Kenneth McAlpine
New Zealand Parliament
Preceded by Harry Ell	Member of Parliament for Christchurch South; 1919–1939	Succeeded by Robert Macfarlane
