= Reuben Davidson =

New Zealand Labour Party politician

Reuben Davidson MP
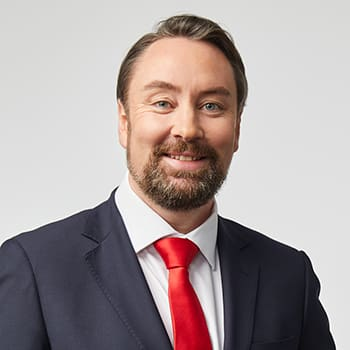
- Davidson in 2020

Member of the New Zealand Parliament for Christchurch East
- Incumbent
- Assumed office 14 October 2023
- Preceded by: Poto Williams

Personal details
- Born: Reuben John Davidson
- Party: Labour
- Profession: Television producer

Reuben John Davidson is a New Zealand television producer and politician. He was on a Christchurch community board from 2019. In the 2023 general election, he was elected to represent the Christchurch East electorate in Parliament.

== Early life and career ==
Davidson was born in Christchurch. He got his first job aged just 14 at a café. Later he was a television producer working at Whitebait Media for over 15 years. For seven years he produced the children's show What Now and later created the show Fanimals. He lives in North New Brighton. Davidson has a degree from the New Zealand Broadcasting School.

== Political career ==
New Zealand Parliament
Years	Term	Electorate	List	Party
2023–2026	54th	Christchurch East	57	Labour
2026–present	55th	Christchurch East	21	Labour

=== Local government ===
At the 2019 local body elections, he was elected to the Banks Peninsula Community Board. Re-elected in 2022, he became chairman of the community board and was also chairman of the Labour-aligned local political ticket The People's Choice.

=== 2020 general election ===
He put himself forward for the Labour nomination in the seat of Port Hills for the 2020 election to replace the retiring Ruth Dyson. He missed out with Labour's vice-president Tracey McLellan winning the selection. He then stood in the seat of Selwyn and was 67th on Labour's 2020 party list. He finished second in Selwyn to National's Nicola Grigg. Despite losing, Davidson polled higher than normal, coming closest to winning the seat for Labour in 27 years.

=== First term, 2023–2026 ===
After Labour's Poto Williams announced her retirement from the Christchurch East electorate in December 2022, Davidson was selected for the seat ahead of Dan Rosewarne, Colin Meurk, Melissa Lama, and Teresa Butler. After gaining selection he stated he would resign from the Banks Peninsula Community Board and donate his community board salary to the Mayoral Relief Fund. He was 57th on Labour's 2023 party list. He was elected to the Christchurch East seat in October 2023 with a margin of over 2000 votes. Davidson was one of just two new MPs elected in Labour's defeat in 2023 along with Cushla Tangaere-Manuel. He stated "It's bittersweet because I'm really aware of the huge shoes I'm stepping into to represent the people of Christchurch East but I had hoped to be doing it as part of a Labour government". In late November 2023, Davidson was appointed as spokesperson for statistics, digital economy and communications, and associate broadcasting and media in the Shadow Cabinet of Chris Hipkins.

Following a front bench reshuffle in early March 2025, Davidson joined Hipkins' new economics team. He also dropped his previous portfolios and assumed the Science, Technology and Innovation portfolio and the Broadcasting, Media, and Creative Economy portfolio. By December 2025, Davidson had drafted a member's bill that proposed making social media providers responsible for restricting "harmful content" with a fine of NZ$50,000 for non-compliance. In mid January 2026, Davidson, as Labour's broadcasting and media spokesperson, announced that a Labour government would propose a streaming levy on foreign streaming companies like Netflix in order to invest in the New Zealand film industry. This proposal was welcomed by Screen Production and Development Association president Irene Gardiner. Following a front bench reshuffle in March 2026, Davidson gained the economic development portfolio.

=== Second term, 2026–present ===
During the 2026 New Zealand general election, Davidson contested the Christchurch East electorate for Labour. He was ranked 21st on the Labour Party list. On 7 November, Davidson retained Christchurch East for Labour by a landslide margin of 9,012 votes based on preliminary results.

New Zealand Parliament
Preceded by Poto Williams	Member of Parliament for Christchurch East; 2023–present	Incumbent
