= 2019 Christchurch mayoral election =

New Zealand mayoral election

- 12 October 2019
- Turnout: 42.29%
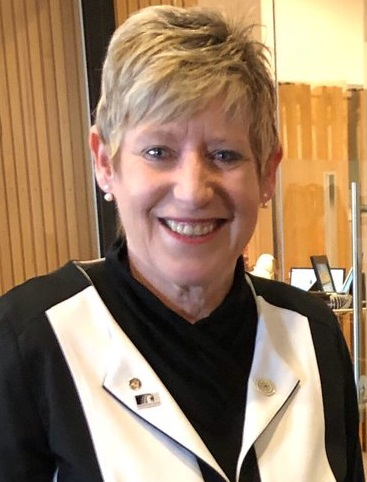
Candidate	Lianne Dalziel	Darryll Park
Party	Independent	Independent
Popular vote	48,400	30,086
Percentage	47.43	29.48
Mayor before election
Lianne Dalziel
Elected mayor
Lianne Dalziel

The 2019 Christchurch mayoral election was part of the New Zealand local elections on 12 October 2019.

== Candidates ==
=== Confirmed ===
- Blair Anderson (Another Mildgreen Initiative), perennial candidate and former deputy leader of the Aotearoa Legalise Cannabis Party
- J T Anderson
- Lianne Dalziel (Best for Christchurch), incumbent mayor
- Jim Glass (Independent)
- Tubby Hansen (Economic Euthenic's), perennial candidate who first stood in 1971
- Robin McCarthy (Independent)
- Stephen McPaike, social housing tenant
- Sam Park
- John Minto (Keep Our Assets Canterbury), activist and 2016 candidate
- Darryll Park (Independent Move Otautahi Christchurch Forward), hospitality business proprietor
- Adrian-Cosmin Schönborn (Independent), telecommunications technician
- Peter Wakeman (STOP Trashing Our Planet)
- Aaron White (Independent)

=== Declined ===
- Nicky Wagner, Christchurch-based National Party MP

== Results ==
2019 Christchurch mayoral election
Party	Candidate	Votes	%	±%
Best for Christchurch	Lianne Dalziel	48,400	47.43	−36.43
Independent Move Christchurch Forward	Darryll Park	30,086	29.48	
Keep Our Assets Canterbury	John Minto	9,827	9.63	−4.94
	J.T. Anderson	5,183	5.07	
Independent	Adrian-Cosmin Schonborn	2,229	2.18	
Independent	Robin McCarthy	1,209	1.18	
	Stephen McPaike	1,101	1.07	
	Sam Park	1,053	1.03	
STOP Trashing Our Planet	Peter Wakeman	815	0.79	
Another Mildgreen Initiative	Blair Anderson	729	0.71	
Independent	Aaron White	547	0.53	
Independent	Jim Glass	542	0.53	
Economic Euthenic's	Tubby Hansen	308	0.30	−1.27
Majority				
Total valid votes				
Informal votes		212		
Turnout		102,029		
Registered electors		241,210		
