= Lianne Dalziel =

New Zealand politician

The Honourable Lianne Dalziel CNZM
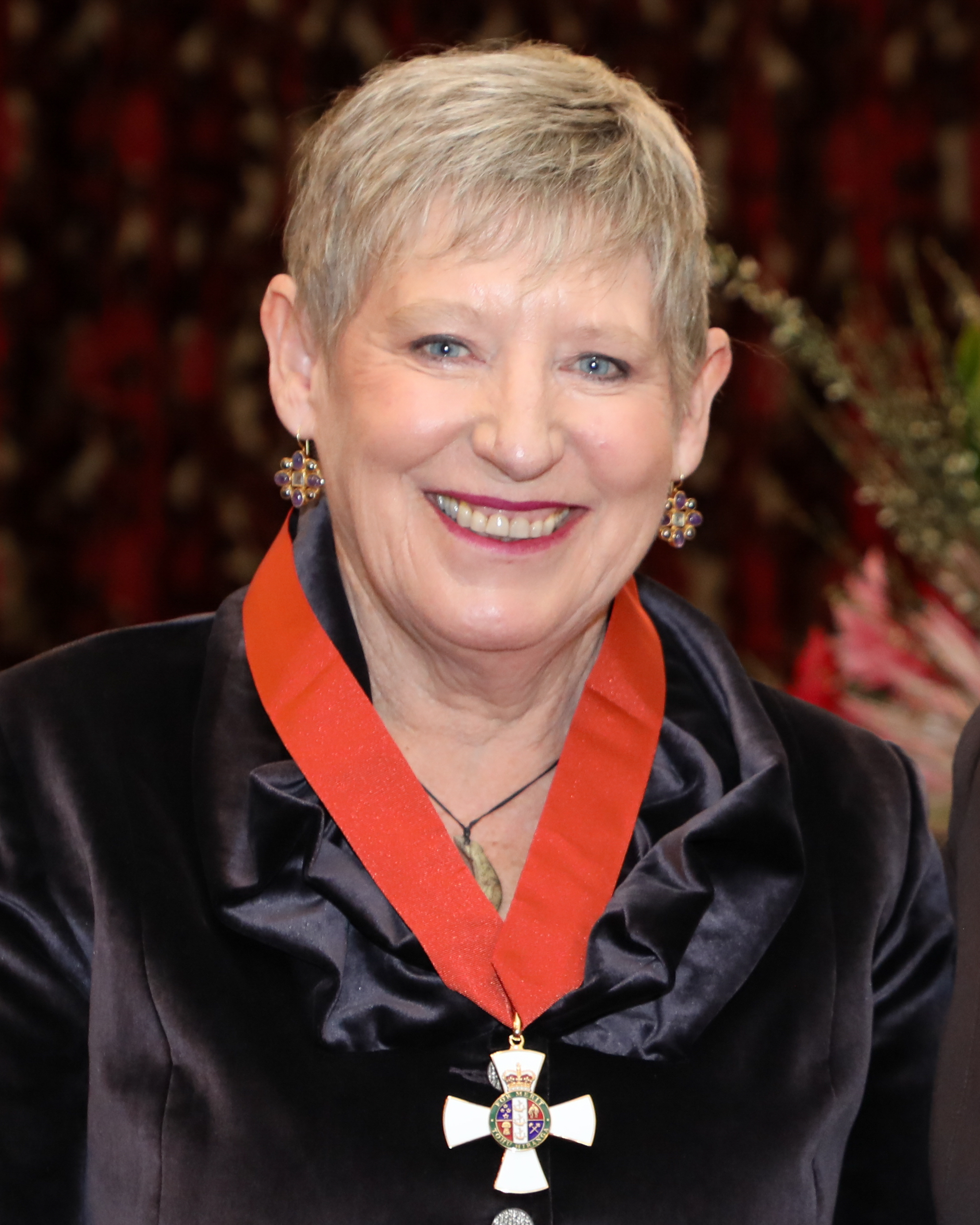
- Dalziel in September 2023

46th Mayor of Christchurch
- In office 24 October 2013 – 8 October 2022
- Deputy: Andrew Turner
- Preceded by: Bob Parker
- Succeeded by: Phil Mauger

6th Minister of Commerce
- In office 15 August 2002 – 21 February 2004
- Prime Minister: Helen Clark
- Preceded by: Paul Swain
- Succeeded by: Margaret Wilson
- In office 19 October 2005 – 19 November 2008
- Preceded by: Pete Hodgson
- Succeeded by: Simon Power

6th Minister for ACC
- In office 28 March 2001 – 15 August 2002
- Prime Minister: Helen Clark
- Preceded by: Michael Cullen
- Succeeded by: Ruth Dyson

49th Minister of Immigration
- In office 10 December 1999 – 21 February 2004
- Prime Minister: Helen Clark
- Preceded by: Tuariki Delamere; Wyatt Creech (Acting)
- Succeeded by: Paul Swain

Member of the New Zealand Parliament for Christchurch Central
- In office 27 October 1990 – 12 October 1996
- Preceded by: Geoffrey Palmer
- Succeeded by: Tim Barnett

Member of the New Zealand Parliament for Labour List
- In office 12 October 1996 – 27 November 1999

Member of the New Zealand Parliament for Christchurch East
- In office 27 November 1999 – 11 October 2013
- Preceded by: Larry Sutherland
- Succeeded by: Poto Williams

Personal details
- Born: Lianne Audrey Dalziel; 7 June 1960 (age 66) Christchurch, New Zealand
- Party: Labour
- Spouse: Rob Davidson (m. 2000; died 2020)
- Relatives: Mike Davidson (stepson)
- Occupation: Trade unionist
- Committees: Commerce Committee (chairperson); Privileges Committee

Lianne Audrey Dalziel CNZM (/dælˈzɛl/; born 7 June 1960) is a New Zealand politician and former mayor of Christchurch. Prior to this position, she was a member of the New Zealand Parliament for 23 years, serving as Minister of Immigration, Commerce, Minister of Food Safety and Associate Minister of Justice in the Fifth Labour Government. She resigned from Cabinet on 20 February 2004 after apparently lying about a leak of documents to the media, but was reinstated as a minister following Labour's return to office after the 2005 election. She resigned from Parliament effective 11 October 2013 to contest the Christchurch mayoral election. The incumbent, Bob Parker, decided not to stand again. She was widely regarded as the favourite and won with a wide margin to become the 46th mayor of Christchurch.

== Early life ==
Dalziel was born in 1960, raised in Christchurch and attended Canterbury University. She graduated with a law degree and was admitted to the Bar in 1984. She served as the legal officer for the Canterbury Hotel and Hospital Workers' Union, and later became the union's Secretary. She also participated in national groups such as the Federation of Labour and the New Zealand Council of Trade Unions.

== Member of Parliament ==
New Zealand Parliament
Years	Term	Electorate	List	Party
1990–1993	43rd	Christchurch Central		Labour
1993–1996	44th	Christchurch Central		Labour
1996–1999	45th	List	4	Labour
1999–2002	46th	Christchurch East	8	Labour
2002–2005	47th	Christchurch East	14	Labour
2005–2008	48th	Christchurch East	26	Labour
2008–2011	49th	Christchurch East	15	Labour
2011–2013	50th	Christchurch East	none	Labour

Dalziel entered Parliament as a Labour Party MP for Christchurch Central in 1990, replacing outgoing former Prime Minister Geoffrey Palmer. She held this seat until the 1996 election (being replaced by Tim Barnett), when she became a list MP under the new MMP electoral system. In the 1999 election, she chose to contest an electorate again, and won the Christchurch East seat. She held the seat in the 2002, 2005, 2008 and 2011 elections. In 2011 she opted not to go on the Labour list.

In November 1990 she was appointed as Labour's spokesperson for the Audit Department and Customs by Labour leader Mike Moore. After Helen Clark replaced Moore as leader in December 1993 Dalziel was promoted and given the Health portfolio. Time magazine picked her as a future leader in its December 1994 edition.

In August 1997 Dalziel was replaced in the Health portfolio by Annette King due to perceived ineffectiveness against Minister of Health Bill English, media believing Alliance Health spokesperson Phillida Bunkle was performing better. Instead she was made Shadow Attorney-General and given the portfolios of immigration, youth affairs and statistics. Dalziel expressed enthusiasm for the chance to utilise her law degree in politics as Shadow Attorney-General.

=== Cabinet minister ===
In the new government formed by Labour, Dalziel became Minister of Immigration, Minister for Senior Citizens, and Minister for Disability Issues. When Labour won re-election in the 2002 election, Dalziel also became Minister of Commerce (while ceasing to be Minister for Disability Issues). In 2003, she ceased to be Minister for Senior Citizens. As Minister of Immigration, Dalziel was often in the spotlight. In particular, she often clashed with Winston Peters, leader of the anti-immigration New Zealand First party.

After the 2005 election, Dalziel was re-elected by her caucus colleagues to Cabinet and was given the portfolios of Commerce, Small Business, and Women's Affairs.

Mike Williams, President of the Labour Party from 2000 to 2009, states that he was surprised by Clark appointing Dalziel Minister of Commerce and thought of it as an "odd choice". But she worked herself into the portfolio, paid attention to detail, and within a year had "proved herself". Williams believes this is due to her high intelligence and her ability to listen. Tim Barnett, MP for Christchurch Central from 1996 to 2008 credits her training as a lawyer and "having a bigger brain than most of us" for her success. Williams states that as Minister of Commerce, Dalziel worked closely with National's Simon Power and built "cross-party unity on various issues".

=== Controversies ===
Dalziel's position became difficult after she was accused of giving certain documents to the press to bolster the case for a decision her Associate Minister had made. The decision, concerning the deportation of a Sri Lankan teenager who was seeking asylum but who had originally lied about the reasons, was controversial, and Dalziel leaked the notes of the teenager's lawyer to TV3, attempting to discredit the teenager's case for asylum. Dalziel tried to avoid admitting to being the source of the documents, but was forced to admit that the leak had been at her direction. There was also significant controversy about how Dalziel had obtained the documents in the first place. Dalziel offered her resignation which Prime Minister Helen Clark accepted.

=== Opposition and mayoral ambitions ===
After Labour was defeated in the 2008 general election, Dalziel became the Opposition spokesperson on Justice and Commerce and, from 2011, the spokesperson for the Christchurch Earthquake Recovery, Civil Defence & Emergence Management, Consumer Rights & Standards, and associate spokesperson for Justice.

Rumours of Dalziel standing as Mayor of Christchurch go back to at least 2009. Since the February 2011 earthquake, the rumours that Dalziel would contest the 2013 Christchurch mayoralty became more consistent. In May 2012, Dalziel tried to put an end to these rumours by announcing: "The job I really want is Gerry Brownlee's, rather than Bob Parker's." Brownlee is Earthquake Recovery Minister, and Parker was the Mayor of Christchurch at the time. In the February 2013 reshuffle of opposition portfolios, Dalziel dropped out of the top 20 (only the first 20 positions are ranked by the Labour Party). An editorial in The Press presumed that her strong support for David Cunliffe was part of the reason for her demotion. The editorial also speculated that she might reconsider her political future:

The demotion is bound to concentrate Dalziel's mind on whether she should run for the Christchurch mayoralty. As things stand, a place for her in a Labour cabinet as minister for the earthquake recovery looks unlikely, but she would be a strong candidate for mayor.

Following months of speculation, The Press reported on 20 April 2013 that Lianne Dalziel would challenge Parker for the mayoralty, and that she had asked 24-year-old Student Volunteer Army organiser Sam Johnson to be her running mate, with a view of Johnson becoming deputy mayor. The newspaper expressed surprise by this pairing, given that Dalziel was a Labour Party member, and Johnson a member of the Young Nats, the youth arm of the National Party. Saying that: "It was a really difficult decision to make, but I don't think it is the right thing for me right now", Johnson eventually decided against running. On 19 June, Dalziel formally confirmed that she would contest the mayoralty, also announcing that she would resign from Parliament, which would trigger a by-election in the Christchurch East electorate. Dalziel delivered her resignation letter on 17 September and delivered her valedictory speech the following day with her resignation taking effect on Friday, 11 October; the day before the local body election so that the by-election campaign did not interfere with the local body election. In a later interview, Dalziel confirmed that she would have left Parliament even if Shearer had put her onto the front bench.

Although some expressed concerns about Dalziel's Labour Party background, including central city property developer Antony Gough, who talked of her "red apron strings" getting in the way of working with local business owners, she also nevertheless open support from the political right for her mayoral ambitions: Christchurch City Councillor Tim Carter, son of Christchurch property developer Philip Carter and nephew of Speaker David Carter, encouraged her to stand for the mayoralty; former National Party cabinet minister Philip Burdon was one of her nominees when she lodged her nomination for the mayoralty with the returning officer; and blogger Cameron Slater, by many considered a "conduit for factions of the National Party" wrote:

Christchurch needs a uniter, not a divider, and the word is that National would far rather deal with Lianne and the competent councillors she is bringing with her than Bob Parker.

Dalziel's Earthquake Recovery portfolio in Labour's shadow cabinet was split and given to Ruth Dyson and Clayton Cosgrove.

== Mayor of Christchurch ==
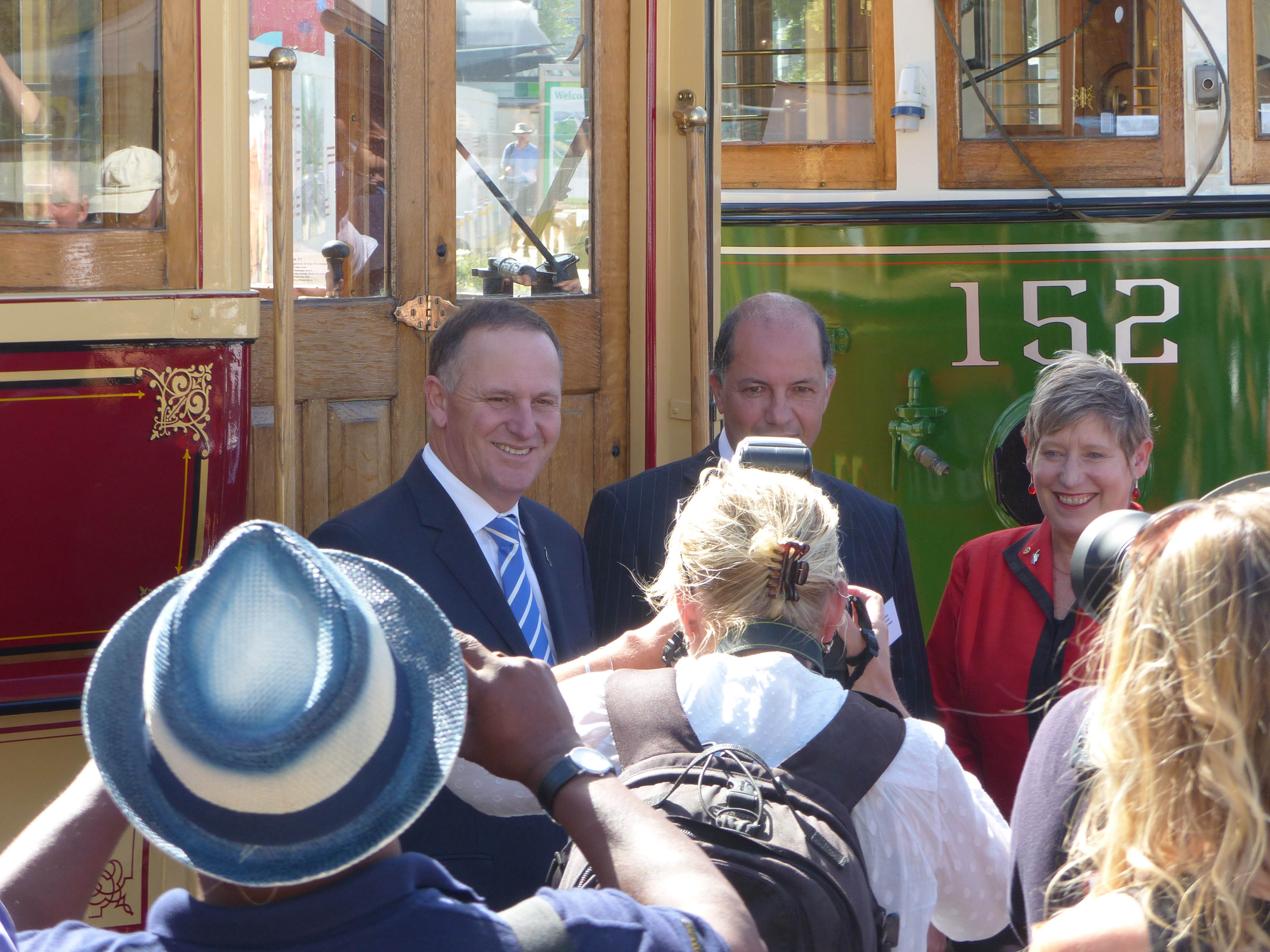
Launch of a tramway extension on 12 February 2015 by Prime Minister John Key and Dalziel

Dalziel was elected Mayor of Christchurch in the October 2013 mayoral election, with a margin of almost 50,000 votes over the next candidate, businessman Paul Lonsdale. She was sworn in on 24 October, with a past mayor, Vicki Buck as her deputy. At the 2019 local election, she won the mayoralty for a third time.

In late February 2020, the New Zealand Police referred Dalziel's election expenses during the 2019 Christchurch mayoral election to the Serious Fraud Office. Two complainants, including rival mayoral candidate John Minto, had filed a complaint regarding donations by six people that exceeded the $1,500 limit under the Local Electoral Act. On 17 December, the Serious Fraud Office cleared Mayor Dalziel, stating that it found no evidence of criminal conduct relating to donations made to the Mayor by several Chinese businessmen during the 2019 mayoral election.

On 1 July 2021, she announced she would not seek re-election as mayor at the local body elections in 2022.

In October 2021, Dalziel expressed opposition to the Sixth Labour Government's Three Waters reform programme, criticising the Government for "mandating councils."

In 2025, Dalziel took part in the unofficial cross-party People's Select Committee, led by Marilyn Waring, which investigated the pay equity changes by the National government.

== Honours ==
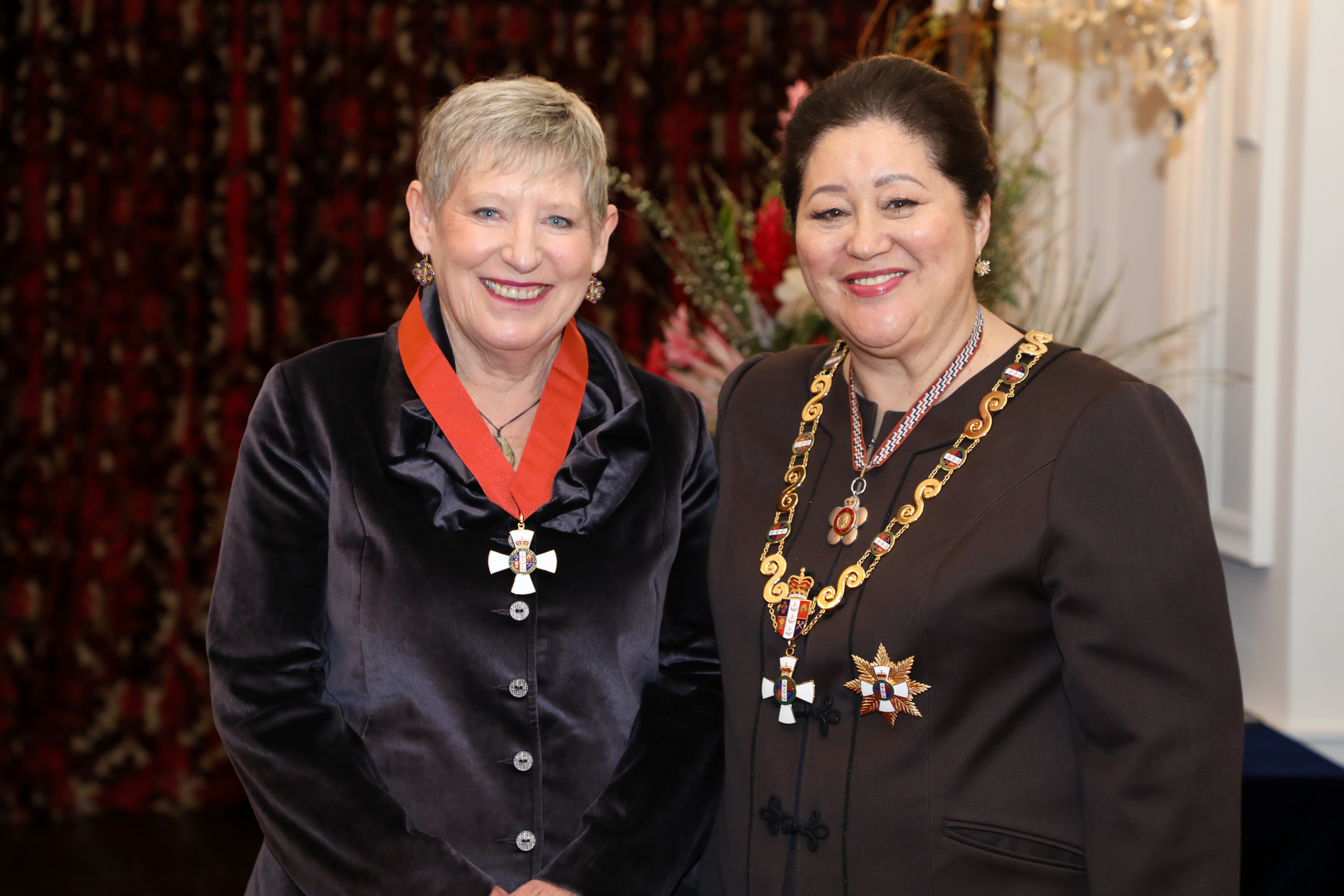
Dalziel (left), after her investiture as a Companion of the New Zealand Order of Merit by the governor-general, Dame Cindy Kiro, at Government House, Wellington, on 26 September 2023

In the 2023 King's Birthday and Coronation Honours, Dalziel was appointed a Companion of the New Zealand Order of Merit, for services to local government and as a Member of Parliament.

== Personal life ==
Dalziel married Mike Pannell in 1988. The pair divorced in 1995 and indicated that the stress of parliamentary life was a major factor in the decision to separate. In 2000, Dalziel married Christchurch lawyer Rob Davidson. He died of prostate cancer in August 2020, aged 69 years.

== See also ==
- Politics of New Zealand
- Government of New Zealand

New Zealand Parliament
Preceded by Geoffrey Palmer	Member of Parliament for Christchurch Central; 1990–1996	Succeeded by Tim Barnett
Preceded by Larry Sutherland	Member of Parliament for Christchurch East; 1999–2013	Succeeded by Poto Williams
Political offices
Preceded by Wyatt Creech (acting); Tuariki Delamere	Minister of Immigration; 1999–2004	Succeeded by Paul Swain
Preceded by David Carter	Minister for Senior Citizens; 1999–2003	Succeeded by Ruth Dyson
Preceded by Michael Cullen	Minister for ACC; 2001–2002	Succeeded by Ruth Dyson
Preceded by Paul Swain	Minister of Commerce; 2002–2004 2005–2008	Succeeded by Margaret Wilson
Preceded by Pete Hodgson	Minister of Commerce; 2002–2004 2005–2008	Succeeded by Simon Power
Preceded by Bob Parker	Mayor of Christchurch; 2013–2022	Succeeded by Phil Mauger
