= Christchurch South =

Christchurch South was a parliamentary electorate in the city of Christchurch, New Zealand, from 1881 to 1890 and then from 1905 to 1946.

== Population centres ==
The previous electoral redistribution was undertaken in 1875 for the 1875–1876 election. In the six years since, New Zealand's European population had increased by 65%. In the 1881 electoral redistribution, the House of Representatives increased the number of European representatives to 91 (up from 84 since the 1875–76 election). The number of Māori electorates was held at four. The House further decided that electorates should not have more than one representative, which led to 35 new electorates being formed, including Christchurch South, and two electorates that had previously been abolished to be recreated. This necessitated a major disruption to existing boundaries.

The boundaries of the Christchurch South electorate were Worcester Street in the north (through Latimer and Cathedral Squares), Fitzgerald Avenue in the east (then called East Town Belt), Moorhouse Avenue in the south (then called South Town Belt), and Hagley Avenue (then called Lincoln Road) and Rolleston Avenue (then called Antigua Street) in the west. The electorate thus comprised the southern half of what is now considered the central city.

== History ==
Thomas Joynt contested the Christchurch South electorate in the 1884 election, but was beaten by the incumbent, John Holmes, with 638 votes to 600.

Westby Perceval, Aaron Ayers, Henry Thomson and Eden George contested the Christchurch South electorate in the 1887 election. Perceval won the election.

The 1939 Christchurch South by-election held on 3 June was caused by the death of Ted Howard during the term of the 26th New Zealand Parliament. On nomination day, two candidates were put forward: Robert Macfarlane for the Labour Party and Melville Lyons for the National Party. Mabel Howard, Ted Howard's daughter, had hoped to be put forward by the Labour Party, and she was endorsed by the local branch of the party. The national executive of the Labour Party chose Macfarlane, and Howard believed that she was opposed by the party's hierarchy due to her connections to John A. Lee, who was seen as a radical within the party. The chosen candidate, Macfarlane, had been Mayor of Christchurch since the previous year. Macfarlane was the successful candidate.

=== Election results ===
The electorate was represented by five members of parliament.

Key

Independent Liberal Labour Independent Liberal United

Election	Winner
1881 election	John Holmes
1884 election	John Holmes
1887 election	Westby Perceval
(Electorate abolished 1890–1905, see City of Christchurch)
1905 election	Harry Ell
1908 election	Harry Ell
1911 election	Harry Ell
1914 election	Harry Ell
1919 election	Ted Howard
1922 election	Ted Howard
1925 election	Ted Howard
1928 election	Ted Howard
1931 election	Ted Howard
1935 election	Ted Howard
1938 election	Ted Howard
1939 by-election	Robert Macfarlane
1943 election	Robert Macfarlane
(Electorate abolished 1946)

== Election results ==
=== 1943 election ===
There were six candidates in 1943, with the election won by Robert Macfarlane over Ron Guthrey.

=== 1939 by-election ===
1939 Christchurch South by-election
Party	Candidate	Votes	%	±%
Labour	Robert Macfarlane	7,900	66.36	
National	Melville Lyons	4,005	33.64	
Majority		3,895	32.72	−10.80
Turnout		11,905	76.36	

=== 1931 election ===
1931 general election: Christchurch South
Party	Candidate	Votes	%	±%
Labour	Ted Howard	7,344	61.77	
United	C S McCully	4,546	38.23	
Majority		2,798	23.53	
Registered electors		13,959		
Turnout		11,890	85.18	

=== 1928 election ===
1928 general election: Christchurch South
Party	Candidate	Votes	%	±%
Labour	Ted Howard	5,171	45.83	
United	Charlie McCully	4,738	41.99	
Reform	William Henry Manhire	1,374	12.18	
Majority		433	3.84	
Informal votes		73	0.64	
Turnout		11,356	87.17	
Registered electors		13,028		

=== 1914 election ===
1914 general election: Christchurch South
Party	Candidate	Votes	%	±%
Liberal	Harry Ell	4,507	56.61	
United Labour	Gains Whiting	2,174	27.30	
Reform	Frederick Boulton Hughes	1,281	16.09	
Majority		2,333	29.30	
Informal votes		131	1.62	
Turnout		8,093	88.46	
Registered electors		9,149		

=== 1908 election ===
1908 general election: Christchurch South, first ballot
Party	Candidate	Votes	%	±%
Independent Liberal	Harry Ell	3,500	53.36	
Ind. Labour League	Jim Thorn	2,227	33.95	
Independent Liberal	Charles Allison	832	12.68	
Majority		1,273	19.41	
Registered electors		8,260		
Turnout		6,559	79.41	

=== 1905 election ===
1905 general election: Christchurch South
Party	Candidate	Votes	%	±%
Liberal	Harry Ell	3,689	57.16	
Independent	Charles Henry Winny	1,178	18.25	
Ind. Labour League	Jim Thorn	1,107	17.15	
New Liberal	John Hadfield	364	5.64	
Majority				
Informal votes		115	1.59	
Turnout		6,453	89.45	
Registered electors		7,214		

== Bibliography ==
- McRobie, Alan (1989). Electoral Atlas of New Zealand. Wellington: GP Books. ISBN 0-477-01384-8.
- Mansfield, F. W. (1909). The General Election, 1908. National Library.
