= Christchurch East =

- Single-member general constituency for the New Zealand House of Representatives
- Interactive map of boundaries from the 2026 election
- Formation: 1871, 1905, 1996
- Region: Canterbury
- Character: Urban and suburban
- Term: 3 years

Member for Christchurch East
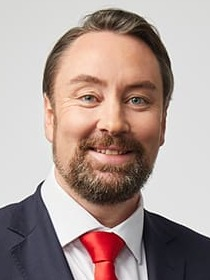
- Reuben Davidson since 14 October 2023
- Party: Labour
- Previous MP: Poto Williams (Labour)
Party vote distribution

Christchurch East, originally called Christchurch City East, is a current New Zealand parliamentary electorate. It was first created for the 1871 election and was abolished for two periods, from 1875–1905 and again from 1946–1996. It was last created for the introduction of the MMP voting system for the 1996 election. The current MP is Reuben Davidson, a member of the New Zealand Labour Party who was first elected in the 2023 New Zealand general election.

== Population centres ==
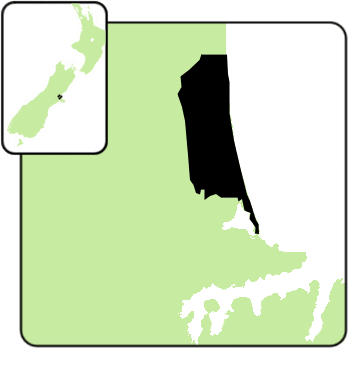
Christchurch East electorate boundaries for the 2008 and 2011 elections

Map of boundaries at the 2020 and 2023 general elections

The electorate is based on the eastern part of the City of Christchurch. When the electorate was first formed through the Representation Act 1870, the western boundary of the electorate was Colombo Street. Unlike today, the eastern boundary was away from the coast; rather, the Avon electorate covered the coastal regions.

The electorate is bounded in the east by the Pacific Ocean and in the north by the Waimakariri River. Since the 2008 election, the western and southern boundary followed Main North Road, Marshland Road, North Parade, Dudley Creek, the Avon River, Keyes Road and Pages Road, before cutting through the Bromley wastewater treatment plant to Cuthberts Road. The boundary then followed Cuthberts Road, Breezes Road and Bridge Street to the Avon River, before following the Avon through the Avon Heathcote Estuary and out to the Pacific Ocean.

The following suburbs, in alphabetical order, are at least partially located in the electorate: Aranui, Avondale, Bexley, Bottle Lake, Bridgend, Brooklands, Burwood, Chaneys, Dallington, Kainga, Marshland, New Brighton, North New Brighton, Ouruhia, Parklands, Queenspark, Shirley, South New Brighton, Southshore, Spencerville, Stewarts Gully, Styx, Waimairi Beach, and Wainoni.

Population loss after the quakes necessitated expansion of the electorate in the 2013/14 redistribution, with the electorate gaining Mairehau and Shirley from Christchurch Central, Bromley from Port Hills and the remainder of Marshland from Waimakariri. Slightly more of Bromley was added from Port Hills at the 2020 redistribution. In the 2025 boundary review, the electorate would gain part of the Linwood-Phillipstown suburbs from Christchurch Central. The initial proposal was to include the suburb of Redwood into the electorate, though this was changed due to public consultation.

== History ==
Christchurch City East was first created for the 1871 election by the Representation Act 1870, which was passed to increase the number of general electorates to 74 from the 61 that were used at the 1866 election. The Representation Act 1870 also disestablished some multi-member electorates, and the three-member City of Christchurch electorate was split up, with one part of it forming the new Christchurch City East electorate.

The first election was contested by Jerningham Wakefield, who had previously represented Christchurch Country in the 1st Parliament (1853–1855), and Andrew Duncan, who was Mayor of Christchurch in 1870. Wakefield won the election and represented the electorate until the end of the electoral term in 1875, when Christchurch City East was abolished, replaced by the three-member electorate City of Christchurch.

Christchurch East was re-created for the 1905 election. The election was contested by Thomas Davey (who had been a representative of the City of Christchurch electorate for the Liberal Party since 1902), William Whitehouse Collins (who had previously been in Parliament for the Liberal Party), Henry Toogood (a young engineer who only recently left Canterbury College and who would become one of the founding members of the Institution of Professional Engineers New Zealand), and Frederick Cooke (a prominent member of the Socialist Party). Davey was successful.

The 1908 election was contested by Davey (the incumbent), Charles Boxshall (who represented the opposition, which at that point had not formed into a political party), James McCombs (who was an Independent Liberal, i.e. he was not part of a formal party), and Frederick Cooke (who had also contested the previous election standing for the Socialist Party). Davey was re-elected, with McCombs coming second. The Second Ballot Act 1908 provided for second or runoff ballots between the top two candidates where the top candidate did not get an absolute majority. As Davey had obtained 55.56% of the votes, a second ballot was not required in Christchurch East.

The 1911 election was contested by Davey (the incumbent), Henry Thacker (a prominent medical doctor standing as an Independent Liberal), Hiram Hunter (who stood for the original Labour Party), and Frederick Cooke (who had also contested the two previous election standing for the Socialist Party). The first ballot was won by Thacker, with Davey beating Hunter by only four votes for second place. A second ballot was required, as Thacker had achieved 32.68% of the votes in the first ballot, far short of an absolute majority. The second ballot was won by Davey with a majority of over 17% of the votes.

Davey planned to contest the 1914 election. The Liberal Government had by now been replaced by the Reform Government. At the opening meeting of his campaign, Davey refused to commit himself to a motion of no confidence against the government, which in turn resulted in the meeting refusing to give him a vote of confidence. A week later, he withdrew his nomination. This left three other candidates in the election: Henry Thacker (who had contested the previous election as an Independent Liberal, but with Davey's withdrawal contested as behalf of the Liberal Party), George Duncan Macfarlane (an auctioneer with no prior political experience who stood for the Reform Party), and Hiram Hunter (who this time contested for the Social Democratic Party, which was the successor to the original Labour Party). Thacker was successful and succeeded Davey.

The 1919 election was contested by Thacker (the incumbent, and since May of that year Mayor of Christchurch) and Hiram Hunter (who this time contested for the Labour Party, which had been founded in 1916). Thacker served for two terms until 1922 and was Mayor of Christchurch until 1923.

Thacker was defeated in the 1922 election by Tim Armstrong of the Labour Party. The third candidate was W R Devereux, a land agent who stood for the Reform Party.

Armstrong successfully contested the 1925 and 1928 elections against Denis Franklyn Dennehy; his challenger stood for the Liberal Party in 1925, and for its successor, the United Party, in 1928. Armstrong was challenged by George Frederick Allen of the United Party in 1931, but Armstrong remained successful. Allen was active in local affairs and was the headmaster of the Sumner District High School (1908–1933).

Armstrong was challenged in 1935 by S W Richardson, who was the official candidate for the United–Reform Coalition in 1935. In 1938, Armstrong was challenged by K I Armour of the National Party. Armstrong died in office on 8 November 1942 from heart disease.

Armstrong's death triggered the 1943 by-election, which was held on 6 February. The by-election was contested by five candidates, including representatives from the Labour Party, the Labour breakaway party Democratic Labour Party and the National Party. The election was won by the Labour candidate, Mabel Howard, and started her long parliamentary career, which included her becoming the first female cabinet minister in 1947. Howard was confirmed later in 1943 in the general election, where her majority increased substantially (by over 17 percentage points).

Christchurch East was abolished in 1946 and re-created in 1996 for the MMP-era. Larry Sutherland, who had previously represented Avon, won the 1996 election. Sutherland retired at the 1999 election and Lianne Dalziel was first elected. Dalziel had previously represented Christchurch Central (1990–1996) and spent the next three years as a list MP.

The Christchurch newspaper The Press reported on 20 April 2013 that Lianne Dalziel will challenge Bob Parker for the Christchurch mayoralty. Dalziel maintained that she was not yet committed to standing, and only formally confirmed on 19 June that she will contest the mayoralty. She confirmed that she will resign from Parliament, thus triggering a by-election in the Christchurch East electorate. Dalziel resigned before the official results were announced.

The by-election was since held on 30 November 2013 in the electorate. This was won by Labour's Poto Williams in a convincing victory despite the view that significant population changes since the 2011 Christchurch earthquake made the allegiance to Labour less certain. Williams held Christchurch East in the 2014 election against National's sitting list MP Jo Hayes.

Since Tim Armstrong's 1922 election win, the electorate (for as long as it has existed) has been held by Labour.

== Members of Parliament ==
Christchurch East has been represented by eight electorate MPs:

Key

Independent Liberal Labour National

Election	Winner
1871 election	Jerningham Wakefield
(Electorate abolished 1875–1905, see City of Christchurch)
1905 election	Thomas Davey
1908 election	Thomas Davey
1911 election	Thomas Davey
1914 election	Henry Thacker
1919 election	Henry Thacker
1922 election	Tim Armstrong
1925 election	Tim Armstrong
1928 election	Tim Armstrong
1931 election	Tim Armstrong
1935 election	Tim Armstrong
1938 election	Tim Armstrong
1943 by-election	Mabel Howard
1943 election	Mabel Howard
(Electorate abolished 1946–1996)
1996 election	Larry Sutherland
1999 election	Lianne Dalziel
2002 election	Lianne Dalziel
2005 election	Lianne Dalziel
2008 election	Lianne Dalziel
2011 election	Lianne Dalziel
2013 by-election	Poto Williams
2014 election	Poto Williams
2017 election	Poto Williams
2020 election	Poto Williams
2023 election	Reuben Davidson
2026 election	Reuben Davidson

=== List MPs ===
Members of Parliament elected from party lists in elections where that person also unsuccessfully contested the Christchurch East electorate. Unless otherwise stated, all MPs' terms began and ended at general elections.

Election	Winner
2008 election	Aaron Gilmore
2011 election	Mojo Mathers
2013	Aaron Gilmore (Note: Gilmore entered Parliament on 19 February 2013, following the resignation of Lockwood Smith. He resigned from Parliament on 27 May 2013.)
2014 election	Mojo Mathers
2014 election	Jo Hayes
2017 election	Jo Hayes
2020 election	Toni Severin

== Election results ==
=== 2026 election ===
The next election will be held on 7 November 2026. Candidates for Christchurch East are listed at Candidates in the 2026 New Zealand general election by electorate § Christchurch East. Official results will be available after 27 November 2026.

=== 2023 election ===
2023 general election: Christchurch East
Notes:	Blue background denotes the winner of the electorate vote. Pink background denotes a candidate elected from their party list. Yellow background denotes an electorate win by a list member, or other incumbent. A ✓ or ✗ denotes status of any incumbent, win or lose respectively.						
Party	Candidate	Votes	%	±%	Party votes	%	±%
Labour	Reuben Davidson	15,163	39.07		13,418	34.18	−26.08
National	Matt Stock	12,766	32.89		11,208	28.55	+11.97
Green	Sahra Ahmed	4,594	11.83		5,675	14.45	+5.99
NZ First	Shane Wiremu	2,030	5.23		2,676	6.81	+4.32
ACT	Toni Severin	1,679	4.32	+0.96	2,786	7.09	+0.93
Legalise Cannabis	Paula Lambert	901	2.32	+0.21	223	0.56	−0.07
New Conservative	Helen Houghton	615	1.58	−1.05	175	0.44	−1.59
Animal Justice	Danette Wereta	353	0.90		114	0.29	
Independent	Sam Park	234	0.60				
Opportunities					1,339	3.41	+1.98
Te Pāti Māori					415	1.05	+0.70
NZ Loyal					402	1.02	
NewZeal					205	0.52	+0.19
Leighton Baker Party					118	0.30	
Freedoms NZ					114	0.29	
DemocracyNZ					106	0.27	
Women's Rights					46	0.11	
New Nation					24	0.06	
Informal votes		470			203		
Total valid votes		38,805			39,247		
Labour hold	Majority	2,397	6.17				

=== 2020 election ===
2020 general election: Christchurch East
Notes:	Blue background denotes the winner of the electorate vote. Pink background denotes a candidate elected from their party list. Yellow background denotes an electorate win by a list member, or other incumbent. A ✓ or ✗ denotes status of any incumbent, win or lose respectively.						
Party	Candidate	Votes	%	±%	Party votes	%	±%
Labour	✓ Poto Williams	25,234	63.28	+9.41	24,563	60.26	+13.18
National	Lincoln Platt	7,898	19.81	−12.20	6,760	16.58	−18.76
Green	Nikki Berry	2,720	6.82	+0.92	3,447	8.46	+1.74
ACT	Toni Severin	1,340	3.36	+2.96	2,511	6.16	+5.83
New Conservative	Helen Houghton	1,050	2.63	+1.92	827	2.03	1.58
Legalise Cannabis	Paula Lambert	843	2.11	+0.51	256	0.63	+0.32
Advance NZ	Glen McConnell	395	0.99	—	357	0.88	—
Outdoors	Charlotte Staples	215	0.54	—	67	0.16	+0.12
ONE	Paula Maree Eason	183	0.46	—	135	0.33	—
NZ First					1,015	2.49	−3.80
Opportunities					582	1.43	−0.88
Māori Party					141	0.35	−3.47
Sustainable NZ					33	0.08	—
Vision NZ					32	0.08	—
Social Credit					33	0.05	±0.00
Heartland					8	0.02	—
TEA					6	0.01	—
Informal votes		768			299		
Total valid votes		39,878			40,076		
Turnout		40,876	83.57	+3.17			
Labour hold	Majority	17,336	43.47	+21.61			

=== 2017 election ===
2017 general election: Christchurch East
Notes:	Blue background denotes the winner of the electorate vote. Pink background denotes a candidate elected from their party list. Yellow background denotes an electorate win by a list member, or other incumbent. A ✓ or ✗ denotes status of any incumbent, win or lose respectively.						
Party	Candidate	Votes	%	±%	Party votes	%	±%
Labour	✓ Poto Williams	18,439	53.87	+5.78	16,414	47.08	+14.92
National	Jo Hayes	10,959	32.01	−3.21	12,319	35.34	−4.45
Green	Cathy Sweet	2,018	5.90	−4.23	2,343	6.72	−5.94
NZ First	Melanie Mark-Shadbolt	1,529	4.47	—	2,194	6.29	−3.16
Legalise Cannabis	Paula Lambert	547	1.60	+0.16	108	0.31	+0.74
Conservative	Chris Brosnan	242	0.71	−3.31	156	0.45	−2.81
ACT	Toni Severin	137	0.40	—	116	0.33	±0.00
Opportunities					807	2.31	—
Māori Party					133	3.82	+3.42
Ban 1080					46	0.13	+0.01
United Future					30	0.09	−0.03
Democrats					19	0.05	−0.01
Outdoors					15	0.04	—
People's Party					14	0.04	—
Internet					12	0.03	−0.85
Mana Party					3	0.01	−0.04
Informal votes		360			132		
Total valid votes		34,231			34,861		
Turnout		35,202	80.40	+3.52			
Labour hold	Majority	7,480	21.86	+8.99			

=== 2014 election ===
2014 general election: Christchurch East
Notes:	Blue background denotes the winner of the electorate vote. Pink background denotes a candidate elected from their party list. Yellow background denotes an electorate win by a list member, or other incumbent. A ✓ or ✗ denotes status of any incumbent, win or lose respectively.						
Party	Candidate	Votes	%	±%	Party votes	%	±%
Labour	✓ Poto Williams	15,221	48.09	−13.21	10,450	32.16	+0.51
National	Jo Hayes	11,148	35.22	+9.16	12,928	39.79	−6.31
Green	Mojo Mathers	3,206	10.13	+3.18	4,113	12.66	+0.98
Conservative	Leighton Baker	1,271	4.02	+0.42	1,058	3.26	+1.11
Legalise Cannabis	Robert Wilkinson	457	1.44	+1.01	186	0.57	+0.07
Māori Party	Tania Mataki	190	0.60	+0.60	129	0.40	+0.11
United Future	Sam Park	159	0.50	+0.50	74	0.23	−0.33
NZ First					3,069	9.45	+3.19
Internet Mana					286	0.88	+0.66
ACT					107	0.33	−0.02
Ban 1080					38	0.12	+0.12
Democrats					20	0.06	−0.02
Civilian					19	0.06	+0.06
Independent Coalition					11	0.03	+0.03
Focus					1	0.00	+0.00
Informal votes		409			141		
Total valid votes		31,652			32,489		
Labour hold	Majority	4,073	12.87	−6.17			

=== 2013 by-election ===
The following table shows the final results of the by-election:

2013 Christchurch East by-election
Notes: Blue background denotes the winner of the by-election. Pink background denotes a candidate elected from their party list prior to the by-election. Yellow background denotes the winner of the by-election, who was a list MP prior to the by-election. A ✓ or ✗ denotes status of any incumbent, win or lose respectively.
Party	Candidate	Votes	%	±%
Labour	Poto Williams	8,414	61.39	+5.86
National	Matt Doocey	3,577	26.10	−10.40
Green	David Moorhouse	954	6.96	+2.15
Conservative	Leighton Baker	494	3.60	+1.74
Independent	Sam Park	78	0.57	+0.57
Legalise Cannabis	Paula Lambert	59	0.43	−0.48
ACT	Gareth Veale	58	0.42	+0.42
Independent	Adam Holland	31	0.23	+0.23
Independent	Ian Gaskin	20	0.15	+0.15
Democrats	Jenner Lichtwark	20	0.15	+0.15
Total Valid votes		13,705		
Informal votes		21	0.15	-1.63
Turnout		13,726		
Labour hold	Majority	4,837	35.29	+16.25

=== 2011 election ===
2011 general election: Christchurch East
Notes:	Blue background denotes the winner of the electorate vote. Pink background denotes a candidate elected from their party list. Yellow background denotes an electorate win by a list member, or other incumbent. A ✓ or ✗ denotes status of any incumbent, win or lose respectively.						
Party	Candidate	Votes	%	±%	Party votes	%	±%
Labour	✓ Lianne Dalziel	15,559	55.54	+2.61	9,100	31.65	−13.62
National	Aaron Gilmore	10,225	36.50	+0.55	13,252	46.10	+10.40
Green	Mojo Mathers	1,347	4.81	−0.62	3,359	11.68	+4.45
Conservative	Leighton Baker	522	1.86	+1.86	617	2.15	+2.15
Legalise Cannabis	Michael Britnell	254	0.91	−0.32	145	0.50	+0.16
United Future	Johnny Miller	108	0.39	−0.22	160	0.56	−0.39
NZ First					1,801	6.26	+2.34
ACT					101	0.35	−1.58
Māori Party					84	0.29	−0.22
Mana					63	0.22	+0.22
Alliance					28	0.10	−0.08
Democrats					22	0.08	+0.01
Libertarianz					17	0.06	+0.02
Informal votes		509			228		
Total valid votes		28,015			28,977		
Labour hold	Majority	5,334	19.04	+2.06			

Electorate (as at 26 November 2011): 39,708

=== 2008 election ===
2008 general election: Christchurch East
Notes:	Blue background denotes the winner of the electorate vote. Pink background denotes a candidate elected from their party list. Yellow background denotes an electorate win by a list member, or other incumbent. A ✓ or ✗ denotes status of any incumbent, win or lose respectively.						
Party	Candidate	Votes	%	±%	Party votes	%	±%
Labour	✓ Lianne Dalziel	17,969	52.92		15,585	45.27	
National	Aaron Gilmore	12,204	35.94		12,289	35.70	
Green	Mojo Mathers	1,843	5.43		2,489	7.23	
Progressive	Elspeth Sandys	575	1.69		696	2.02	
Legalise Cannabis	Paula Lambert	417	1.23		117	0.34	
Kiwi	Tony Le Cren	378	1.11		269	0.78	
United Future	Maretta Solomon	204	0.60		326	0.95	
Alliance	Paul Piesse	119	0.35		62	0.18	
Independent	Sevaschan Sam Park	114	0.34				
Workers Party	Paul Hopkinson	90	0.27		26	0.08	
Democrats	Nick McIlraith	40	0.12		24	0.07	
NZ First					1,352	3.93	
ACT					664	1.93	
Bill and Ben					210	0.61	
Māori Party					176	0.51	
Family Party					68	0.20	
Pacific					54	0.16	
Libertarianz					14	0.04	
RAM					5	0.01	
RONZ					1	0.00	
Informal votes		267			202		
Total valid votes		33,953			34,427		
Labour hold	Majority	5,765	16.98				

=== 2005 election ===
2005 general election: Christchurch East
Notes:	Blue background denotes the winner of the electorate vote. Pink background denotes a candidate elected from their party list. Yellow background denotes an electorate win by a list member, or other incumbent. A ✓ or ✗ denotes status of any incumbent, win or lose respectively.						
Party	Candidate	Votes	%	±%	Party votes	%	±%
Labour	✓ Lianne Dalziel	20,969	60.31		18,893	53.44	
National	David Round	8,996	25.88		9,851	27.86	
Green	Mary McCammon	1,698	4.88		1,948	5.51	
United Future	Dianne Wilson	1,205	3.47		1,176	3.33	
Progressive	Karen Silcock	926	2.66		926	2.62	
ACT	John Peters	401	1.15		277	0.78	
Legalise Cannabis	Kevin O'Connell	299	0.86		101	0.29	
Alliance	Lynda Boyd	167	0.48		98	0.28	
Direct Democracy	Kyle Chapman	63	0.18		13	0.04	
Anti-Capitalist Alliance	Paul Hopkinson	43	0.12				
NZ First					1,694	4.77	
Destiny					170	0.48	
Māori Party					97	0.27	
Christian Heritage					54	0.15	
Democrats					18	0.05	
Libertarianz					13	0.04	
Family Rights					7	0.02	
99 MP					6	0.02	
RONZ					6	0.02	
One NZ					5	0.01	
Informal votes		424			186		
Total valid votes		34,787			35,353		
Labour hold	Majority	11,973	34.44				

=== 2002 election ===
2002 general election: Christchurch East
Notes:	Blue background denotes the winner of the electorate vote. Pink background denotes a candidate elected from their party list. Yellow background denotes an electorate win by a list member, or other incumbent. A ✓ or ✗ denotes status of any incumbent, win or lose respectively.						
Party	Candidate	Votes	%	±%	Party votes	%	±%
Labour	✓ Lianne Dalziel	19,784	63.92	+7.12	16,142	51.29	+4.46
National	Stephen Johnston	4,920	15.90		4,368	13.88	−10.39
Green	Mary McCammon	1,557	5.03		2,068	6.57	+1.70
United Future	Paul Duxbury	1,532	4.95		2,394	7.61	
ACT	John Peters	841	2.72		1,212	3.85	+0.35
Progressive	David Culverhouse	834	2.69		1,171	3.72	
Christian Heritage	Judith Phillips	577	1.86	−0.52	441	1.40	−1.00
Legalise Cannabis	Michael Britnell	512	1.65	−0.50	222	0.71	−0.69
Alliance	Colin Pounder	315	1.02		466	1.48	−9.90
ACAP	Philip Ferguson	79	0.26				
NZ First					2,532	8.05	+5.81
ORNZ					430	1.37	
One NZ					15	0.05	
Mana Māori					8	0.03	+0.00
NMP					3	0.01	+0.01
Informal votes		389			102		
Total valid votes		30,951			31,472		
Labour hold	Majority	14,864	48.02	+13.11			

=== 1999 election ===
1999 general election: Christchurch East
Notes:	Blue background denotes the winner of the electorate vote. Pink background denotes a candidate elected from their party list. Yellow background denotes an electorate win by a list member, or other incumbent. A ✓ or ✗ denotes status of any incumbent, win or lose respectively.						
Party	Candidate	Votes	%	±%	Party votes	%	±%
Labour	Lianne Dalziel	18,157	56.80		15,084	46.83	+10.38
National	John Knox	6,995	21.88		7,816	24.26	−2.21
Alliance	Paul Piesse	2,127	6.65		3,665	11.38	−6.11
Green	Jacqui Wood	1,296	4.05		1,568	4.87	
Christian Heritage	Judith Phillips	761	2.38		774	2.40	
Legalise Cannabis	Michael Britnell	688	2.15		449	1.39	−0.54
Christian Democrats	Chantelle Stiles	669	2.09		456	1.42	
ACT	Alan Beecham	667	2.09		1,127	3.50	0.47
NZ First	Margaret Silverlock	528	1.65		719	2.23	−6.52
Natural Law	Warwick Jones	80	0.25		58	0.18	0.06
United NZ					143	0.44	+0.04
Libertarianz					131	0.41	+0.40
South Island					73	0.23	
Animals First					71	0.22	+0.04
McGillicuddy Serious					36	0.11	−0.05
One NZ					18	0.06	
Mana Māori					11	0.03	+0.02
Mauri Pacific					5	0.02	
The People's Choice					4	0.01	
Republican					2	0.01	
Freedom Movement					1	0.00	
NMP					1	0.00	
Informal votes		513			269		
Total valid votes		31,968			32,212		
Labour hold	Majority	11,162	34.92				

=== 1996 election ===
1996 general election: Christchurch East
Notes:	Blue background denotes the winner of the electorate vote. Pink background denotes a candidate elected from their party list. Yellow background denotes an electorate win by a list member, or other incumbent. A ✓ or ✗ denotes status of any incumbent, win or lose respectively.						
Party	Candidate	Votes	%	±%	Party votes	%	±%
Labour	Larry Sutherland	11,174	35.17		11,675	36.44	
National	Sue McKenzie	8,216	25.86		8,480	26.47	
Alliance	Marie Venning	7,305	22.99		5,601	17.48	
NZ First	Lem Pearse	2,970	9.35		2,805	8.76	
Legalise Cannabis	Tim Shadbolt	1,368	4.31		618	1.93	
ACT	Jeffrey Buchanan	569	1.79		971	3.03	
McGillicuddy Serious	Phil Clayton	105	0.33		51	0.16	
Natural Law	Sean O'Connor	61	0.19		38	0.12	
Christian Coalition					1,494	4.66	
United NZ					128	0.40	
Animals First					59	0.18	
Progressive Green					48	0.15	
Green Society					17	0.05	
Advance New Zealand					14	0.04	
Superannuitants & Youth					13	0.04	
Ethnic Minority Party					8	0.02	
Asia Pacific United					4	0.01	
Mana Māori					4	0.01	
Conservatives					3	0.01	
Libertarianz					3	0.01	
Te Tawharau					1	0.00	
Informal votes		360			93		
Total valid votes		31,768			32,035		
Labour win new seat	Majority	2,958	9.31				

=== 1943 election ===
1943 general election: Christchurch East
Party	Candidate	Votes	%	±%
Labour	Mabel Howard	8,911	64.39	+17.11
National	Reginald Gilbert Brown	3,374	24.38	−0.21
Democratic Labour	Herman Theodore Schou	1,277	9.23	−17.50
Real Democracy	Fred Whiley	278	2.01	
Informal votes		213	1.52	
Majority		5,537	40.01	−11.48
Turnout		14,053	87.77	+22.76
Registered electors		14,835		

=== 1943 by-election ===
1943 Christchurch East by-election
Party	Candidate	Votes	%	±%
Labour	Mabel Howard	4,559	47.27	−28.47
Democratic Labour	Horace Herring	2,578	26.73	
National	Melville Lyons	2,371	24.59	+0.33
Independent	Lincoln Efford	114	1.18	
Independent	Owen McKee	22	0.23	
Majority		1,981	20.54	−30.95
Registered electors		14,835		
Turnout		9,644	65.01	−26.42

=== 1938 election ===
1938 general election: Christchurch East
Party	Candidate	Votes	%	±%
Labour	Tim Armstrong	10,561	75.74	+2.25
National	Ken Armour	3,382	24.26	+1.49
Informal votes		73	0.52	−0.61
Majority		7,179	51.49	+0.76
Turnout		14,016	91.43	
Registered electors		15,330		

=== 1935 election ===
1935 general election: Christchurch East
Party	Candidate	Votes	%	±%
Labour	Tim Armstrong	8,299	73.49	+9.16
United/Reform	Sydney Richardson	2,571	22.77	−12.90
Independent	Berthold Ahlfeld	422	3.74	
Informal votes		129	1.13	
Majority		5,728	50.73	+22.07
Turnout		9,420	80.75	−7.47
Registered electors		11,666		

=== 1931 election ===
1931 general election: Christchurch East
Party	Candidate	Votes	%	±%
Labour	Tim Armstrong	7,196	64.33	+3.93
United	George Frederick Allen	3,990	35.67	−3.93
Informal votes		488	4.30	
Majority		3,206	28.66	+7.87
Turnout		9,420	80.75	−7.47
Registered electors		11,666		

=== 1928 election ===
1928 general election: Christchurch East
Party	Candidate	Votes	%	±%
Labour	Tim Armstrong	6,564	60.40	−2.64
United	Denis Franklyn Dennehy	4,304	39.60	+2.64
Informal votes		488	4.30	
Majority		2,260	20.79	−5.28
Turnout		11,356	84.93	
Registered electors		13,371		

=== 1925 election ===
1925 general election: Christchurch East
Party	Candidate	Votes	%	±%
Labour	Tim Armstrong	6,902	63.04	+15.83
Liberal	Denis Franklyn Dennehy	4,047	36.96	+1.57
Informal votes		216	2.29	+1.39
Majority		2,855	26.08	+5.00
Turnout		9,420	80.75	−7.47
Registered electors		11,666		

=== 1922 election ===
1922 general election: Christchurch East
Party	Candidate	Votes	%	±%
Labour	Tim Armstrong	4,535	47.21	+7.75
Liberal	Henry Thacker	3,400	35.39	−25.14
Reform	William Russell Devereux	1,671	17.40	
Informal votes		216	2.29	+1.39
Majority		1,135	11.82	−9.26
Turnout		9,420	80.75	−7.47
Registered electors		11,666		

=== 1919 election ===
1919 general election: Christchurch East
Party	Candidate	Votes	%	±%
Liberal	Henry Thacker	5,572	60.54	+7.01
Labour	Hiram Hunter	3,632	39.46	+10.65
Informal votes		216	2.29	+1.39
Majority		1,940	21.08	−3.64
Turnout		9,420	80.75	−7.47
Registered electors		11,666		

=== 1914 election ===
1914 general election: Christchurch East
Party	Candidate	Votes	%	±%
Liberal	Henry Thacker	4,093	53.53	+20.85
Social Democrat	Hiram Hunter	2,203	28.81	−2.08
Reform	George Duncan Macfarlane	1,350	17.66	
Informal votes		70	0.91	−0.43
Majority		1,890	24.72	+22.99
Turnout		7,716	88.21	3.79
Registered electors		8,747		

=== 1911 election ===
1911 general election: Christchurch East, first ballot
Party	Candidate	Votes	%	±%
Independent Liberal	Henry Thacker	2,492	32.68	
Liberal	Thomas Davey	2,360	30.95	−24.61
Labour	Hiram Hunter	2,356	30.89	
Socialist	Frederick Cooke	418	5.48	−2.57
Informal votes		103	1.33	
Majority		132	1.73	−24.87
Turnout		7,729	84.42	−0.24
Registered electors		9,155		

1911 general election: Christchurch East, second ballot
Party	Candidate	Votes	%	±%
Liberal	Thomas Davey	4,042	58.55	−24.61
Independent Liberal	Henry Thacker	2,861	41.45	
Informal votes		33	0.48	
Majority		1,181	17.11	−24.87
Turnout		6,936	75.76	
Registered electors		9,155		

=== 1908 election ===
1908 general election: Christchurch East, first ballot
Party	Candidate	Votes	%	±%
Liberal	Thomas Davey	3,479	55.56	+13.94
Liberal–Labour	James McCombs	1,813	28.95	
Socialist	Frederick Cooke	504	8.05	+6.61
Conservative	Charles Boxshall	466	7.44	
Informal votes		124	1.93	
Majority		1,666	26.60	+17.65
Turnout		6,262	84.31	−0.35
Registered electors		7,427		

=== 1905 election ===
1905 general election: Christchurch East
Party	Candidate	Votes	%	±%
Liberal	Thomas Davey	2,625	41.61	
New Liberal	Henry Toogood	2,060	32.66	
Liberal	William Whitehouse Collins	1,532	24.29	
Socialist	Frederick Cooke	91	1.44	
Informal votes		124	1.93	
Majority		565	8.96	
Turnout		6,432	84.66	
Registered electors		7,597		

=== 1871 election ===
1871 general election: Christchurch East
Party	Candidate	Votes	%	±%
Independent	Jerningham Wakefield	169	52.32	
Independent	Andrew Duncan	154	47.68	
Majority		15	4.64	
