= Jack Roberts (unionist) =

New Zealand trade unionist

John William Roberts (3 September 1885 – 12 June 1962) was a New Zealand clothing worker, trade unionist and political activist. He was born in Holbeck, Yorkshire, England in 1885.

A conscientious objector in World War I, Roberts was deprived of civil liberties for ten years, and was unable to return to politics after the war, so joined the trade union movement instead, serving across a range of unions. In the buildup to and during World War II, he actively campaigned against conscription, unlike other World War I conscientious-objectors-cum-labour-supporters such as Peter Fraser.

He was elected to the Woolston Borough Council in 1917 as a Labour Party candidate.
