= Tim Armstrong (politician) =

New Zealand politician

The Honourable Tim Armstrong
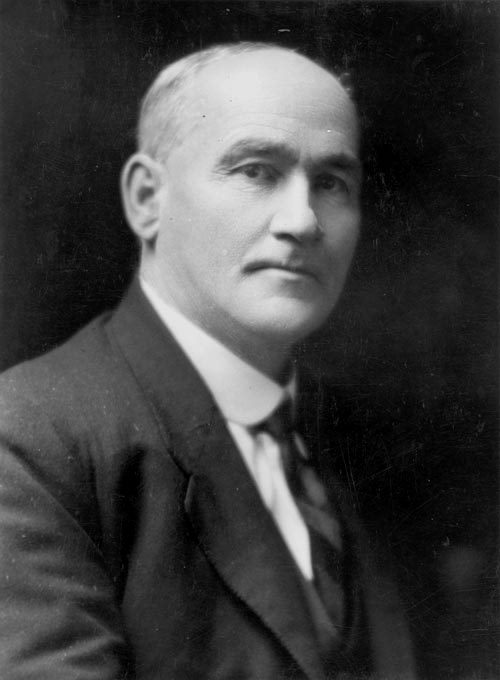

12th Minister of Health
- In office 30 April 1940 – 21 January 1941
- Prime Minister: Peter Fraser
- Preceded by: Peter Fraser
- Succeeded by: Arnold Nordmeyer

1st Minister of Housing
- In office 13 December 1938 – 8 November 1942
- Prime Minister: Michael Joseph Savage; Peter Fraser
- Succeeded by: Bob Semple

14th Minister of Labour
- In office 6 December 1935 – 13 December 1938
- Prime Minister: Michael Joseph Savage
- Preceded by: Adam Hamilton
- Succeeded by: Paddy Webb

13th President of the Labour Party
- In office 3 April 1934 – 24 April 1935
- Vice President: James Roberts
- Preceded by: Frank Langstone
- Succeeded by: Walter Nash

Member of the New Zealand Parliament for Christchurch East
- In office 7 December 1922 – 8 November 1942
- Preceded by: Henry Thacker
- Succeeded by: Mabel Howard

Personal details
- Born: 28 September 1875 Bulls, New Zealand
- Died: 8 November 1942 (aged 67) Wellington, New Zealand
- Resting place: Christchurch, New Zealand
- Party: Labour
- Spouse: Alice Fox (m. 7 March 1900)
- Relations: Tommy Armstrong (son)
- Children: Five

Hubert Thomas "Tim" Armstrong (28 September 1875 – 8 November 1942) was a New Zealand politician in the Labour Party.

== Biography ==
=== Early life and career ===
Armstrong was born in Bulls to the recent Irish immigrants Mary Newcombe and her husband, Martin Armstrong. He had nine siblings and his father was a blacksmith by trade, but worked as a labourer in New Zealand. His mother was a nurse and washerwoman. Tim Armstrong left school when he was eleven and worked in flax milling and in the bush near Bulls. In 1895, he started working in the mines at Waihi. He married Alice Fox on 7 March 1900 at Paeroa. Stemming from his parentage he was a convinced Roman Catholic and a supporter of Irish nationalism.

He joined the Thames Miners' Union which by 1901 was seeking increases to wages and safer working conditions, but were perpetually refused by the owners. Armstrong's union involvement increased markedly helped found the new Waihi Amalgamated Miners' and Workers' Union. In 1907 he helped conduct its first case in the Court of Arbitration in 1907, which was able secure only modest salary increases. As a result of this the union and Armstrong himself grew disillusioned with the arbitration process and became attracted to the more radical idea of syndicalism they were introduced to through the New Zealand Federation of Miners (to whom they were affiliated). Armstrong was elected vice president of the miners' federation in October 1908 holding the office for two years. He also entered politics for the first time and was elected to the Waihi Borough Council from 1907 to 1909. At the 1908 general election he contested the parliamentary seat of Ohinemuri as an independent labour candidate, finishing last of five candidates.

Owing to his newfound radicalisation, Armstrong was dismissed from his mining job in Waihi and he and his family were forced to leave the area, settling at the coal mining town of Runanga on the West Coast. He found another mining job soon after and later became the secretary of the West Coast Workers' Union. He entered local politics there as well, serving on the Runanga Borough Council between 1911 and 1913.

In 1916 he moved to Christchurch, becoming a dockworker on the wharves in Lyttelton. By this time the labour movement were voicing concerns about cost of living increases for workers, servicemen and their dependents and, by the end of the year, were actively protesting government imposed conscription. In 1917 Armstrong gave a speech at a street-corner meeting stating that the motivation for conscription was mostly due to the government wanting to increase their control over workers, not out of a necessity to defeat the Central Powers. He also accused politicians of intimidating workers and claimed that were soldiers paid adequately there would be no need to legislate to enlist volunteers. Armstrong was arrested and subsequently prosecuted for sedition, spending a year in prison.

=== Political career ===
New Zealand Parliament
| Years | Term | Electorate | Party |
|---|---|---|---|
| 1922–1925 | 21st | Christchurch East | Labour |
| 1925–1928 | 22nd | Christchurch East | Labour |
| 1928–1931 | 23rd | Christchurch East | Labour |
| 1931–1935 | 24th | Christchurch East | Labour |
| 1935–1938 | 25th | Christchurch East | Labour |
| 1938–1942 | 26th | Christchurch East | Labour |

Armstrong was elected to the Christchurch City Council from 1919 to 1925, and again from 1927 to 1929. Whilst a member of the city council he was a perpetual advocate for public works schemes and municipal housing to both create employment and improve the quality of life for workers. In 1919 he became secretary of the Christchurch Tramway Employees' Union, holding the office until 1922 when he resigned. From 1921 to 1922 Armstrong was vice-president of the Labour Party and later was its president from 1934 to 1935.

He was also elected a member of the Lyttelton Harbour Board and was chairman of the board from 5 June 1930 to 4 June 1931.

He was selected as the Labour Party candidate for Christchurch North in the 1919 general election. As a unionist who had spent a year in Lyttelton goal for sedition, he had no chance of being elected in this well off electorate, and the incumbent, Leonard Isitt, was successful. He later stood for and won the nearby seat of Christchurch East at the 1922 general election, representing it until his death. He tirelessly advocated for his working-class constituents in parliament to increase wages, improve housing quality, and for the need of active government policies to reduce unemployment which rose rapidly in the 1920s. Armstrong also argued that secondary industries needed to be established in New Zealand, believing that overdependence on farm exporting was a mistake. One noted occasion led him to impugn the government who seemed content the country be little more than 'a cowyard' and ministers were 'only capable of thinking in terms of beef and butterfat'.

He held ministerial positions in the First Labour Government, including as Minister of Labour, where in 1936 he legislated a major reform to the Industrial Conciliation and Arbitration Act which established a statutory minimum wage, standardised the 40-hour week and enshrined compulsory unionism. It also benefitted workers not previously covered by the act. Armstrong also acted quickly to improve salaries and employment conditions for New Zealand's workforce. He also initiated an expansion of the Employment Promotion Fund which developed marginal farmland and improved local infrastructure through subsidised labour. He was also Minister of Immigration during this period.

After the government was re-elected at the 1938 general election, Armstrong was instead appointed Minister of Housing. During the previous parliament the government had initiated its state housing scheme under John A. Lee leaving Armstrong to merely oversee the operations and administration of the scheme as well as defend it from criticisms made by the opposition who were particularly concerned with the cost.

In 1940 he was additionally made Minister of Health, although he was replaced by Arnold Nordmeyer in 1941, because of the problems negotiating with doctors over Labour's health proposals. In exchange he was appointed Minister of Works where he oversaw the extensive construction of defence emplacements that were necessitated by World War II. With the war becoming a more dominant issue he was downhearted by the government's decision to introduce conscription, and reputedly argued against it in cabinet. However he publicly defended conscription by arguing it to be a wartime necessity and that with the stipulations of pricing controls and an avoidance of using the measure against workers, his position was consistent, to an extent, with those in 1916.

=== Death ===
Armstrong died of heart disease in Wellington in 1942. His ailments were hastened by a bronchial defect caused by the unsafe working conditions he encountered decades earlier in the mines. He was given a state funeral in Wellington before being transferred to Christchurch where the streets were lined with thousands of people for his funeral procession. He was buried at Bromley Cemetery on 12 November 1942.

One of his sons, Tommy Armstrong, was later a Member of Parliament for Napier for the Labour party from 1943 until 1951.

== Notes ==
Political offices
| Preceded by Adam Hamilton | Minister of Labour; 1935–1938 | Succeeded by Paddy Webb |
| Preceded by Alexander Young | Minister of Immigration; 1935–1940 | Succeeded by David Wilson |
| New title | Minister of Housing; 1938–1942 | Succeeded by Bob Semple |
| Preceded by Peter Fraser | Minister of Health; 1940–1941 | Succeeded by Arnold Nordmeyer |
| Preceded by Bob Semple | Minister of Works; 1941–1942 | Succeeded by Bob Semple |
| Preceded by Henry Holland | Chairman of the Lyttelton Harbour Board; 1930–1931 | Succeeded by Hugh Monro |
New Zealand Parliament
| Preceded by Henry Thacker | Member of Parliament for Christchurch East; 1922–1942 | Succeeded by Mabel Howard |
Party political offices
| Preceded by Frank Langstone | President of the Labour Party; 1934–1935 | Succeeded by Walter Nash |
