= 1939 Christchurch South by-election =

New Zealand by-election

← 1938 general	3 June 1939	1943 general →
- Turnout: 11,905 (76.36%)
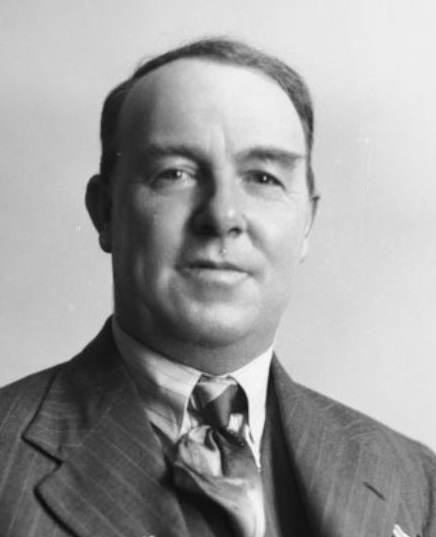

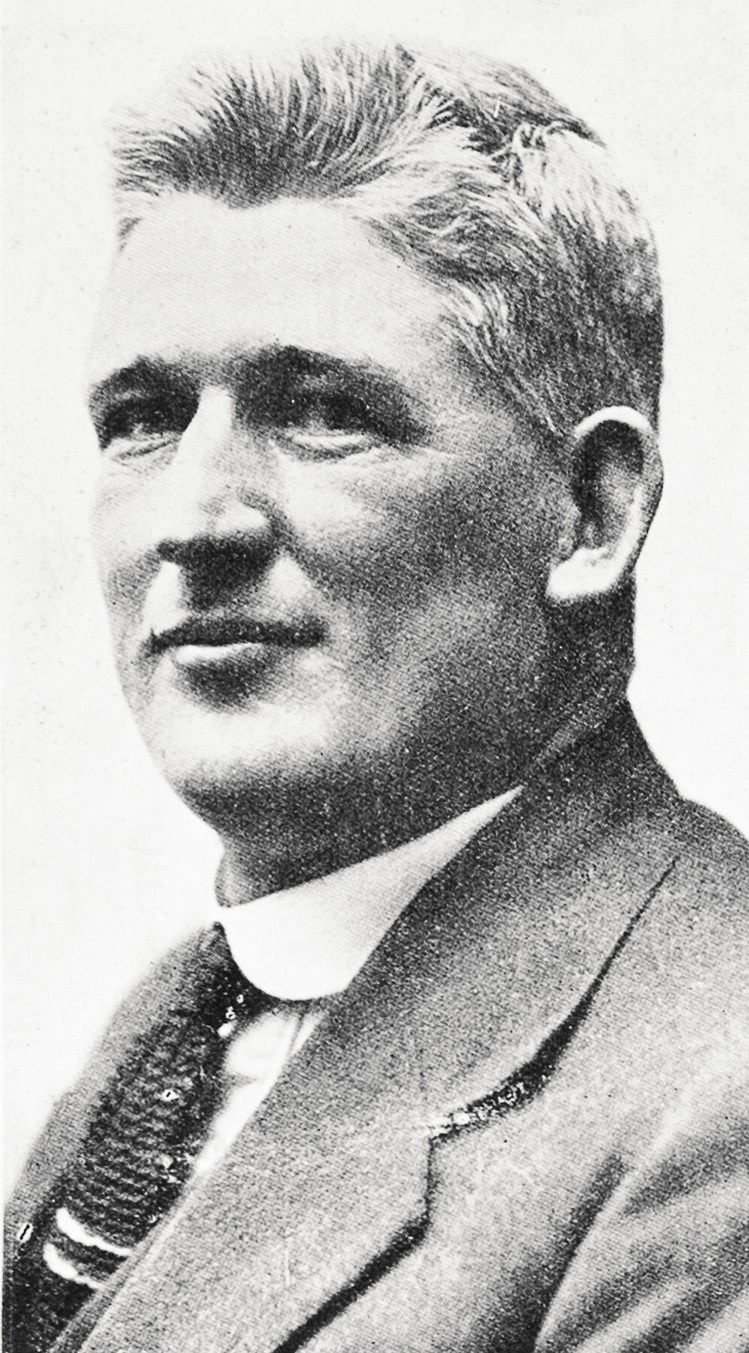
Candidate	Robert Macfarlane	Melville Lyons
Party	Labour	National
Popular vote	7,900	4,005
Percentage	66.36%	33.64%
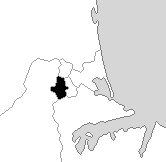
- Christchurch South electorate boundaries used for the by-election
MP before election
Ted Howard
Labour
Elected MP
Robert Macfarlane
Labour

The 1939 Christchurch South by-election held on 3 June was caused by the death of Ted Howard during the term of the 26th New Zealand Parliament. The by-election in the Christchurch South electorate was contested by Robert Macfarlane for Labour and Melville Lyons for National, with Macfarlane winning the election. At the time, Macfarlane was Mayor of Christchurch.

== Background ==
Since the first election of Ted Howard in the 1919 general election, Christchurch South was held by the Labour Party. At the last general election in 1938, Howard had polled 9,885 votes versus 3,890 votes for Gladstone Ward, the son of former Prime Minister Joseph Ward. When Howard died on 26 April 1939, the electorate was thus regarded as a safe seat for Labour.

On nomination day, two candidates were put forward, Robert Macfarlane for the Labour Party and Melville Lyons for the National Party. Mabel Howard, Ted Howard's daughter, had hoped to be put forward by the Labour Party, and she was endorsed by the local branch of the party. The national executive of the Labour Party chose Macfarlane, and Howard believed that she was opposed by the party's hierarchy due to her connections to John A. Lee, who was seen as a radical within the party. The chosen candidate, Macfarlane, had been Mayor of Christchurch since the previous year.

== Results ==
Results of the Christchurch South general election held on 15 October 1938 were:

Christchurch South general election, 1938
Party	Candidate	Votes	%	±%
Labour	Ted Howard	9,885	71.76	
National	Gladstone Ward	3,890	28.24	
Majority		5,995	43.52	
Turnout		13,775		

Results of the by-election held on 3 June 1939 were:

1939 Christchurch South by-election
Party	Candidate	Votes	%	±%
Labour	Robert Macfarlane	7,900	66.36	
National	Melville Lyons	4,005	33.64	
Majority		3,895	32.72	−10.80
Turnout		11,905	76.36	

There were 20 polling booths and Lyons obtained a majority at only two of those (at Kilmore Street and at the Provincial Chambers in Durham Street). Macfarlane could increase the Labour vote at one polling booth only (Antigua Street in Sydenham). Macfarlane stated that in his belief, about 2,000 Labour Party supporters did not vote because the outcome of the election was a foregone conclusion. This view was disputed in an editorial by The Evening Post, arguing that the reduced Labour support is due to Howard's popularity that Macfarlane does not possess despite many high-profile politicians having campaigned on Labour's behalf, and that it is more likely that National supporters have suffered from apathy, as Lyons never had any hope of winning the election.

Macfarlane held the electorate until its abolition at the 1946 general election and subsequently Christchurch Central until the 1969 general election, when he retired.
