= Mabel Howard =

New Zealand trade unionist and politician (1894–1972)

The Honourable Mabel Howard
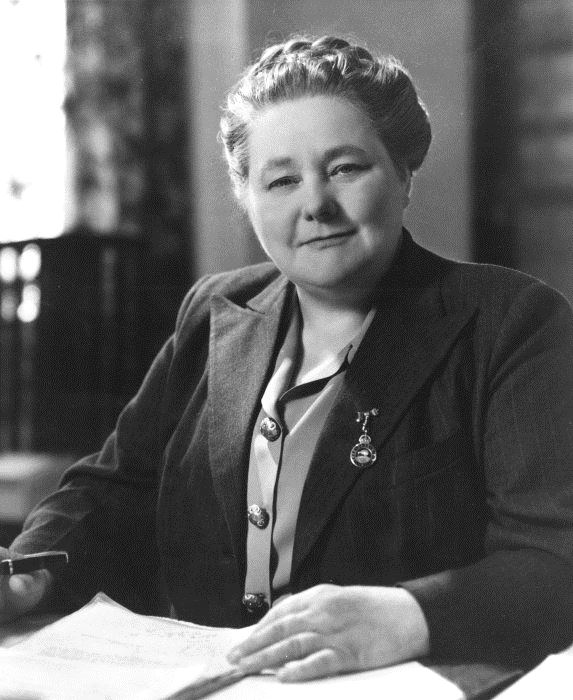

9th Minister of Social Security
- In office 12 December 1957 – 12 December 1960
- Prime Minister: Walter Nash
- Preceded by: Hilda Ross
- Succeeded by: Norman Shelton

14th Minister of Health
- In office 29 May 1947 – 13 December 1949
- Prime Minister: Peter Fraser
- Preceded by: Arnold Nordmeyer
- Succeeded by: Jack Watts

Member of the New Zealand Parliament for Sydenham Christchurch East (1943–1946)
- In office 6 February 1943 – 29 November 1969
- Preceded by: Tim Armstrong
- Succeeded by: Norman Kirk

Personal details
- Born: 18 April 1894 Bowden, Adelaide, Australia
- Died: 23 June 1972 (aged 78) Sunnyside Hospital, Christchurch, New Zealand
- Party: Labour
- Relations: Ted Howard (father)
- Profession: Politician, trade unionist, and community worker

Mabel Bowden Howard (18 April 1894 – 23 June 1972) was a New Zealand trade unionist and politician. She was the first woman secretary of a predominantly male union (the Canterbury General Labourers' Union).

She was a Member of Parliament for the Labour Party from 1943 until 1969. In 1947 she became New Zealand's first woman cabinet minister when she was made Minister of Health and Minister in charge of Child Welfare. She is remembered for waving two large pairs of bloomers in Parliament in support of her successful campaign to have clothing sizes standardised.

== Early life ==
Mabel Howard was born in Bowden, near Adelaide, Australia, on 18 April 1894. She moved to New Zealand with her father (Ted Howard) and sisters after her mother, Harriet Garard Goring, died in 1903. In 1908, after leaving school, she took a commercial course at the Christchurch Technical Institute.

== Political career ==
=== Trade unions ===
Howard joined the Christchurch Socialist Party when still at the Christchurch Technical Institute. She entered the Trades Hall in 1911 as an office assistant for the Canterbury General Labourers' Union. In 1933, at the age of 39, she became the first woman to become secretary of a predominantly male union in New Zealand. In 1942, she was appointed national secretary of the New Zealand Federated Labourers' Union and was again the first woman to hold such a position.

=== Local body politics ===
Between 1933 and 1968, Howard was a councillor for Christchurch City Council for a total of 19 years: 1933–1935, 1938–1941, 1950–1958 and 1963–1968. Howard also served on the Christchurch Drainage Board and North Canterbury Hospital Board.

=== Member of Parliament ===
New Zealand Parliament
Years	Term	Electorate	Party
1943	26th	Christchurch East	Labour
1943–1946	27th	Christchurch East	Labour
1946–1949	28th	Sydenham	Labour
1949–1951	29th	Sydenham	Labour
1951–1954	30th	Sydenham	Labour
1954–1957	31st	Sydenham	Labour
1957–1960	32nd	Sydenham	Labour
1960–1963	33rd	Sydenham	Labour
1963–1966	34th	Sydenham	Labour
1966–1969	35th	Sydenham	Labour

Her father, Ted Howard, was Member of Parliament for Christchurch South from 1919 until his death in 1939. Mabel Howard hoped to be chosen to stand for the 1939 by-election after her father's death, and although she had local support, the Labour Party chose Christchurch mayor Robert Macfarlane.

In 1943, Mabel Howard was elected Member of Parliament for Christchurch East at a by-election, becoming New Zealand's fifth female MP. She retained the seat at the 1943 general election, becoming the first woman MP to be re-elected.

In 1946, Mabel Howard became the Member of Parliament for the new Sydenham electorate, winning 75.2 percent of the vote. This was an outstanding result and a reflection of the high regard in which she was held. Howard's concern was for "women, the aged, the sick and the unfortunate" (5 September 1944). In Parliament, she was a "forthright" representative for her people, stating "I stand here and say what I honestly believe" (September 1961).

In 1953, Howard was awarded the Queen Elizabeth II Coronation Medal.

In Parliament in 1954, she waved two pairs of bloomers that were both labelled OS in front of an astonished House. She demonstrated that, although clothing was supposed to be in standard sizes and correctly labelled, much variation existed. The two pieces were quite clearly of differing sizes. Although opposed by clothing manufacturers, she received much support from the House, including from National Party members and standardisation was legislated. On another occasion, she threw a stone onto the floor of Parliament to illustrate what buyers of bagged coal may find. Before an election campaign in the early 1960s, she said she intended to campaign in a pair of slippers to demonstrate the difficulty in obtaining practical shoes for women: "Those offered all have extremely pointed toes and stiletto heels, which ruined footpaths and carpets".

=== Cabinet Minister ===
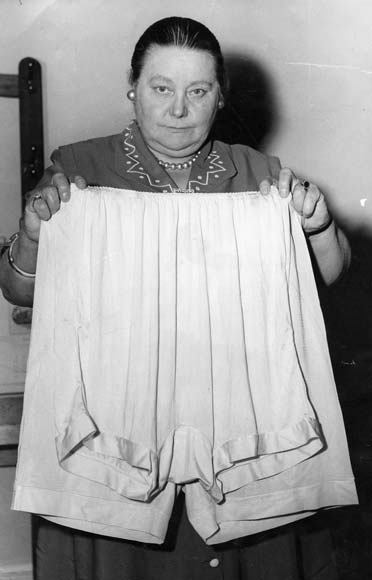
Howard with her pairs of bloomers in 1954

Howard became a Cabinet Minister only four years after entering Parliament. In 1947, she became Minister of Health and Child Welfare and was the first woman Cabinet Minister in the Commonwealth outside of Britain. When the Labour Party was returned to office in 1957, Howard again achieved Cabinet rank as Minister of Social Security and Child Welfare and Minister for the Welfare of Women and Children. Harry Atmore, the Independent MP for Nelson, recognised Mabel Howard's contribution to New Zealand: "She is a real advocate for the women of this country and with the experience she has had – much wider than ladies of her age usually have – she can speak with authority".

Howard advocated for equal rights for women, especially equal pay, and campaigned on many issues including social security, the cost of living and housing. She stated that she "worked like a slave". She is quoted as saying:

I was in politics for a purpose – my very life was politics. I suppose this was because I was more manly than most women; that’s why I never married.

== Community service ==
During World War Two she organised the Canterbury Women's War Service Auxiliary and chaired a club for servicewomen in Christchurch. In relation to this work she said, "I am a pacifist at heart, at a time like this one cannot be a pacifist and retain one's honour. Women can best serve their country by being prepared for any emergency."

She worked as a volunteer for many organisations, among them St John's Ambulance and the Royal New Zealand Society for the Prevention of Cruelty to Animals (RNZSPCA). She successfully fought to enact the first Prevention of Cruelty to Animals Bill in 1960 and was president of the Canterbury branch of the RNZSPCA for nearly twenty years.

== Later life ==
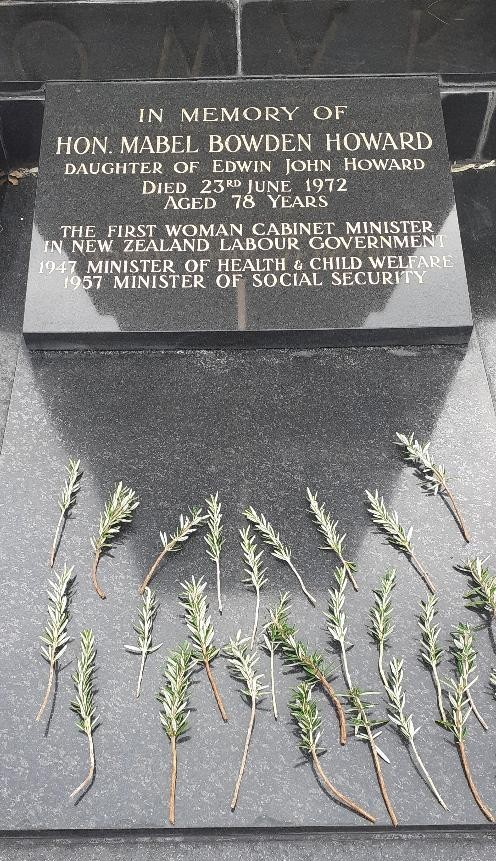
Mabel Howard's grave in Bromley Cemetery, Christchurch, April 2026

By the time the 1966 election campaign began, Mabel Howard was clearly ill. Mel Courtney, a member of her campaign committee and later MP for Nelson (1976–81), ensured she was assisted at public appearances. Howard had helped his family in their hour of need and now he was helping her. Howard retired from politics at the 1969 election, after a lifetime of service to her community. The Labour Party had introduced a compulsory retirement age for MPs, which applied to Howard, who had already been showing signs of ageing. Once retired, she became increasingly isolated and paranoid, on top of the onset of dementia and pneumonia that she had already suffered while still in Parliament. On a court order, she was eventually committed to Sunnyside Hospital, a mental asylum. She died there on 23 June 1972. She is buried with her father, Ted Howard, at Bromley Cemetery in Christchurch.

== Notes ==
Political offices
Preceded by Hilda Ross	Minister for Social Security; 1957–1960	Succeeded by Norman Shelton
Preceded by Arnold Nordmeyer	Minister of Health; 1947–1949	Succeeded by Jack Watts
New Zealand Parliament
Preceded by Tim Armstrong	Member of Parliament for Christchurch East; 1943–1946	Vacant Constituency abolished; recreated in 1996 Title next held by Larry Sutherland
Vacant Constituency abolished in 1890 Title last held by Richard Molesworth Taylor	Member of Parliament for Sydenham; 1946–1969	Succeeded by Norman Kirk
