= Lincoln Efford =

Lincoln Arthur Winstone Efford (4 August 1907 – 24 April 1962) was a New Zealand pacifist, social reformer and adult educationalist. He was born in Christchurch, New Zealand, on 4 August 1907.
