= Douglas Maclean =

New Zealand politician (1852–1929)

Sir Douglas Maclean
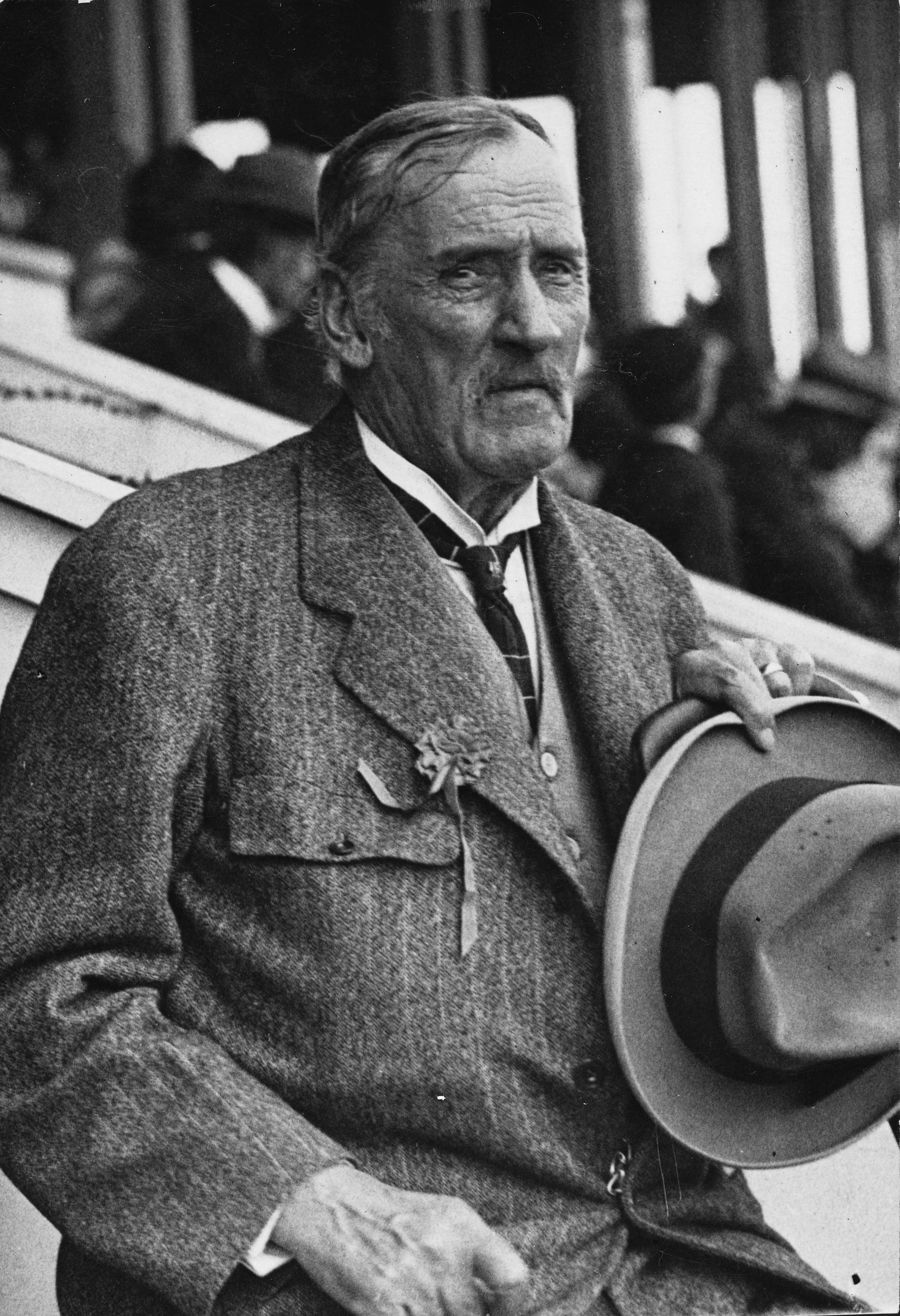

Member of the New Zealand Parliament for Napier
- In office 1896–1899
- Preceded by: Samuel Carnell
- Succeeded by: Alfred Fraser

Personal details
- Born: Robert Donald Douglas McLean; 7 November 1852 Wellington, New Zealand
- Died: 7 February 1929 (aged 76)
- Party: Independent conservative
- Relations: Donald McLean (father); Charles Fountaine (son-in-law); Andrew Fountaine (grandson)

Sir Robert Donald Douglas Maclean (7 November 1852 – 7 February 1929), generally known as Douglas Maclean but earlier spelled McLean like his father, was one of the largest land holders in the Hawke's Bay region of New Zealand. He was regarded as the country's most successful breeder of shorthorn cattle and Welsh Ponies. He had inherited his station from his father, Donald McLean, who was one of the most influential figures in Māori-Pākehā relations in the mid-1800s. For one term, Douglas Maclean represented the Napier electorate as an independent Conservative member of parliament. After his death, his station was broken up and the land is now covered by 60 farms. The woolshed of his station still exists. It is registered as a Category I heritage structure by Heritage New Zealand.

== Early life ==
His parents, Donald McLean and Susan Douglas Strang, married on 28 August 1851 in Wellington. He was born in that city a good year later and shortly afterwards, his mother died in December 1852. His father was deeply affected by the loss and never remarried. He was known as Douglas, and initially used his father's spelling of the surname as McLean, but later changed to and preferred Maclean (with an 'a' and a lower case 'l').

He spent most of his early years in Napier, but received his education at Auckland Grammar School. He left New Zealand in 1864 for further study at Temple Grove in Surrey and Clifton College in Bristol, England. He returned to New Zealand and worked for the Wellington law firm of Hart and Buckley. He was an able athlete and won the first two bicycle races held in Wellington, and was one of the very early rugby players.

After several years, he returned to England to study law. He was called to the bar in that country, but did not practice. He returned to New Zealand in 1870 and inherited his father's Maraekakaho Station in 1877. In October 1877, he set up the Te Makarini Trust in memory of his father. From the initial endowment of £3,000, Te Aute College is providing annual scholarships to gifted Māori students.

== Farming ==
As a farmer, Maclean was regarded as New Zealand's foremost breeder of shorthorn cattle and Welsh Ponies. He was also recognised as a breeder of draught horses, and various sheep breeds (Lincoln, English Leicester, and Merino). He had a large woolshed built on the station that had capacity for 5,000 sheep. The remaining building (an attached night pen has been demolished) is registered with Heritage New Zealand as a Category I heritage structure, with registration number 1026. At its peak, Maraekakaho Station had 50,777 acres (205.49 km^{2}), 63,000 sheep and 80 staff. The land reforms introduced by the Seddon Ministry resulted in land having to be sold off. After Maclean's death, the station was cut up and sold by auction; 60 farms now cover the original Maraekakaho Station. Maclean was regarded as a good employer.

== Community involvement ==
New Zealand Parliament
Years	Term	Electorate	Party
1896–1899	13th	Napier	Conservative

Maclean was a member of various public bodies. He was elected to the Hawke's Bay County Council and the Hawke's Bay Hospital Board. For a time, he was the president of the Hawke's Bay Agricultural and Pastoral Society.

There were speculations that Maclean would be the conservative candidate in the Napier electorate in the 1890 election upon his return from England instead of George Swan, but this was not correct. Swan contested the election and was successful against the Liberal Party candidate Michael Gannon. In the 1896 election, the Liberal Party incumbent Samuel Carnell was challenged by Maclean, with Maclean achieving a large majority of 2456 votes to 1709. Maclean represented the Napier electorate in Parliament for one term until 1899, when he was narrowly defeated (1994 votes to 1956) by the Liberal Party candidate Alfred Fraser. Politics was not his calling, and he was known to say that "a country made progress despite of its politicians".

== World War I ==
He went to England during World War I and, together with his wife, was involved in various patriotic activities. He was on the executive committee of New Zealand Walton Hospital, the country's first military hospital in England. He was a member of the New Zealand War Contingent Association, and chaired the executive committee of the New Zealand's Soldiers' Hostel. The Macleans returned to Maraekakaho after the war, and he became a strong supporter of the Navy League. In the 1927 New Year Honours, he was appointed a Knight Bachelor, for services to New Zealand.

== Family and death ==
Maclean married Irish-born Florence Kate Butler-Stoney in September 1884 while he studied law in England. They had one son and two daughters. Their son, Algernon Donald Douglas Maclean, (1892- 5 November 1923) died from injuries received during World War I. His youngest daughter Louisa Constance Catherine Maclean (1890–1968) married Vice Admiral Charles Fountaine, and Andrew Fountaine was thus their grandson.

Maclean died on 7 February 1929. His estate was valued at just under £750,000, he left endowments to various organisations and made provisions for various friends and former employees. The family grave is on Napier Hill. His wife died in 1940.

== Notes ==
New Zealand Parliament
Preceded by Samuel Carnell	Member of Parliament for Napier; 1896–1899	Succeeded by Alfred Fraser
