= Peter Tait (mayor) =

Sir Peter Tait KBE

14th Mayor of Napier
- In office 17 November 1956 – 12 October 1974
- Deputy: Peter Cox
- Preceded by: Ron Spriggs
- Succeeded by: Clyde Jeffery

Member of the New Zealand Parliament for Napier
- In office 1 September 1951 – 13 November 1954
- Preceded by: Tommy Armstrong
- Succeeded by: Jim Edwards

Personal details
- Born: 5 September 1915 Wellington, New Zealand
- Died: 31 January 1996 (aged 80) Napier, New Zealand
- Party: National
- Spouse: Lilian Dunn (m. 1946)
- Children: 2
- Profession: Retalier

Sir Peter Tait KBE (5 September 1915 – 31 January 1996) was a New Zealand National Party Member of Parliament, mayor of Napier, small businessman and opponent of New Zealand's Homosexual Law Reform Act.

== Early life ==
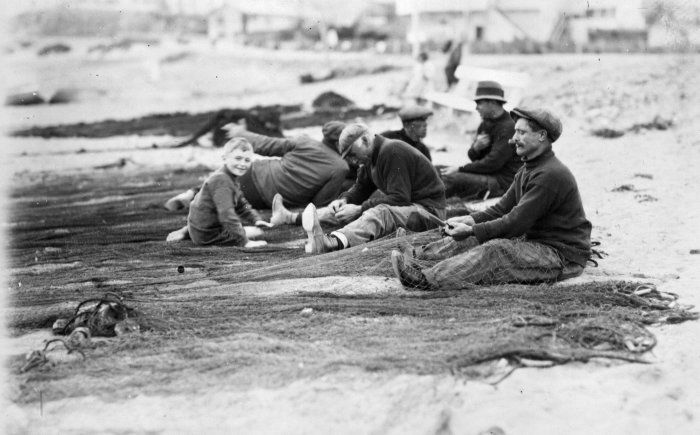
Five fishermen sitting by their nets on a beach, with a young boy, Peter Tait.

Tait was born on 5 September 1915, in Wellington's Island Bay suburb. His family were Scottish immigrants, originally from the Shetland Islands. His father Jack and his uncles Peter and Ross belonged to the best known Shetland fishing families in Island Bay. Through his early life, Tait suffered from tuberculosis, which meant that he was unable to play an active role in New Zealand's Second World War effort, nor could he become a Baptist minister.

He recovered from tuberculosis at the Pukeora sanitorium at Waipukurau, a rural community, to the East Coast of the North Island. From there he moved to, and ultimately settled in Napier. Once established there, he opened a shoe store, which came to have branches in Waipukurau, Napier, Hastings and Dannevirke.

He married Lilian Jean Dunn in 1946 with whom he had one son and one daughter.

== Political career ==
=== Member of Parliament ===
New Zealand Parliament
Years	Term	Electorate	Party
1951–1954	30th	Napier	National

In August 1951 he was selected over six other nominees to be the National Party candidate for the Napier electorate. National won a landslide victory at the election and Tait won the Napier seat, somewhat surprisingly as Napier had been a relatively safe Labour seat for decades. Tait served as a Member of Parliament for one term until he was defeated by Labour's Jim Edwards. In 1953, he was awarded the Queen Elizabeth II Coronation Medal.

=== Mayor of Napier ===
Two years after leaving Parliament, he was elected Mayor of Napier, defeating the incumbent mayor Ron Spriggs. He remained mayor for the next eighteen years until 1974 when he retired. He campaigned on a platform of improving council services and recreational facilities, increasing pensioner housing and tourist promotion. Major projects were completed during his mayoralty including the construction of the National Aquarium of New Zealand and Marineland. The council began cleaning up the inner Ahuriri harbour by shifting sewerage outfall to Awatoto from Perfume Point, the construction of a new Civic Centre and a massive extension of land for housing. Napier also absorbed the Taradale Borough Council after a 1968 amalgamation and Tait secured Napier Airport being designated the main airport for Hawke's Bay in preference to the Hastings Aerodrome. Some of his projects caused opposition such as the building of a boating marina in the Ahuriri inner lagoon and a proposal to demolish the iconic Sound Shell.

Tait was appointed an Officer of the Order of the British Empire in the 1967 New Year Honours and promoted to Knight Commander of the Order of the British Empire in the 1975 New Year Honours.

== Later life and death ==
After leaving office Tait worked as a financial consultant and was appointed as a financial adviser and professional fundraiser for the Auckland Regional Authority in 1977. Later that year he was appointed chairman of directors of Bowring Burgess Finance.

Tait was a Baptist, who helped to organise the Coalition of Concerned Citizens in the mid-eighties, and argued against homosexual law reform. Together with Keith Hay, the former Mount Roskill, he organised a public petition to oppose the Homosexual Law Reform bill in Parliament. Ultimately, though, the Homosexual Law Reform Act 1986 passed its final reading.

He sold his company Tait Associates Limited to AdvisorCorp, contributory mortgage company he chaired. The company failed in 1988, causing Tait (and his investors) much emotional and financial grief. Tait himself was suspected of corporate fraud in relation to AdvisorCorp however he escaped any prosecution, though two of the principals in the company were successfully prosecuted after AdvisorCorp collapsed. He fought for years afterwards attempting to clear his name. AdvisorCorp, found itself the target of attacks from National Party leader Jim Bolger in the 'Gang of Twenty' affair in 1989. Bolger would later publicly apologise to Tait.

He funded the Tait Fountain in Napier, which commemorates Victory in Europe Day and was dedicated on 9 May 1995 on the 50th anniversary of the end of that war.

He died in 1996, aged 80. His widow, Lilian, died in 2011.

New Zealand Parliament
Preceded by Tommy Armstrong	Member of Parliament for Napier; 1951–1954	Succeeded by Jim Edwards
Political offices
Preceded by Ron Spriggs	Mayor of Napier; 1956–1974	Succeeded by Clyde Jeffery
