= 1917 Hawkes Bay by-election =

New Zealand by-election

- 8 March 1917
- Turnout: 4,858 (48.82%)
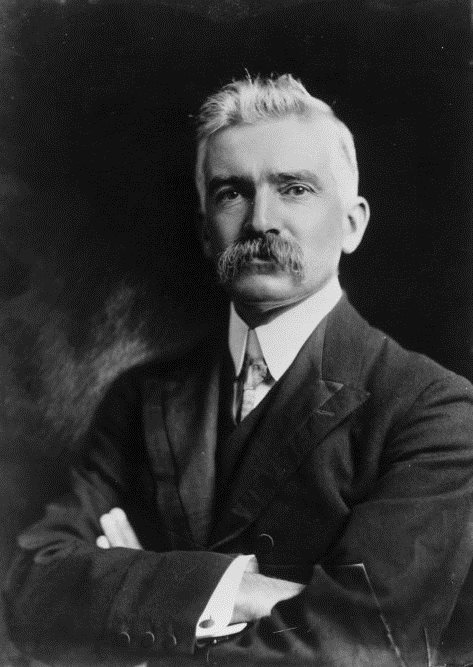

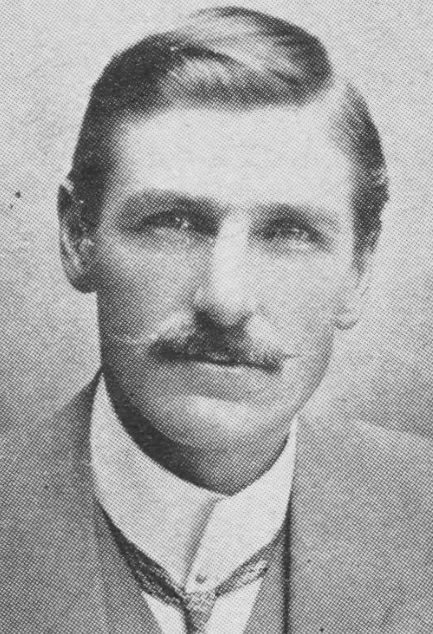
Candidate	Sir John Findlay	H. Ian Simson
Party	Liberal	Liberal–Labour
Popular vote	2,635	2,164
Percentage	54.24	44.54
Member before election
Robert McNab
Liberal
Elected Member
Sir John Findlay
Liberal

The 1917 Hawkes Bay by-election was a by-election held in the eastern North Island electorate of Hawkes Bay during the 19th New Zealand Parliament, on 8 March 1917.

It was caused by the death of incumbent MP Robert McNab, and was won by fellow party Liberal Party member Sir John Findlay with a majority of 471 votes.

== Background ==
Under the terms of the coalition agreement between Reform and the Liberals a condition was made not to oppose each other in by-elections for deceased or retiring MPs from their own parties. As the deceased MP for this electorate was a Liberal the Reform Party did not contest the seat, and endorsed the Liberal's official candidate as a sign of goodwill and wartime unity. The newly formed Labour Party chose not to stand a candidate, but there was rumour that former MP for Nelson, Harry Atmore was considering standing in "Labour" interests. This did not eventuate.

Sir John Findlay was chosen by the Liberal Party to contest the seat, he was a former Legislative Councillor and served in Sir Joseph Ward's cabinet from 1906 to 1911 as Attorney-General and later as Minister of Justice. Former Napier MP Alfred Fraser previously sought the Liberal nomination, however he retired from the contest, yet 9 votes were still cast for him.

H. Ian Simson also stood in support of the National Government and was Findlay's only real competition for the seat.

== Results ==
The following table gives the election results:

1917 Hawkes Bay by-election
Party	Candidate	Votes	%	±%
Liberal	Sir John Findlay	2,635	54.24	
Liberal–Labour	H. Ian Simson	2,164	44.54	
Liberal	Alfred Fraser	9	0.18	
Informal votes		50	1.02	
Majority		471	9.69	
Turnout		4,858	48.82	
Registered electors		9,950		

Findlay held the seat until the next general election and then retired.
