= 1877 Napier by-election =

New Zealand by-election

The 1877 Napier by-election was a by-election held in the Napier electorate during the 6th New Zealand Parliament, on 15 February 1877.

The by-election was caused by the death of incumbent MP Donald McLean and was won by Fred Sutton. John Buchanan, Henry Stokes Tiffen, William Colenso, and William Barnard Rhodes were the unsuccessful candidates, with Sutton subsequently elected with a majority of 23 votes. Richmond Beetham (eldest son of William Beetham) acted as returning officer. Rhodes had retired from the election but was still regarded as an official candidate.

== Results ==
The following table gives the results of the by-election:

1877 Napier by-election
Party	Candidate	Votes	%	±%
Independent	Fred Sutton	317	42.10	
Independent	John Buchanan	294	39.04	
Independent	Henry Stokes Tiffen	128	17.00	
Independent	William Colenso	13	1.73	
Independent	William Barnard Rhodes	1	0.13	
Majority		23	3.05	
Turnout		753		
