= Tommy Armstrong (New Zealand politician) =

New Zealand politician (1902–1980)

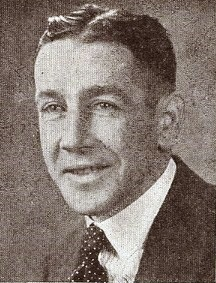

Member of the New Zealand Parliament for Napier
- In office 25 September 1943 – 1 September 1951
- Preceded by: Bill Barnard
- Succeeded by: Peter Tait

Personal details
- Born: 17 May 1902 New Zealand
- Died: 21 November 1980 (aged 78) Christchurch, New Zealand
- Party: Labour
- Spouse: Irene Gladys Nelson
- Relations: Tim Armstrong (father)
- Children: 5
- Profession: Engineer

Arthur Ernest "Tommy" Armstrong (17 May 1902 – 21 November 1980) was a New Zealand politician of Christchurch and Napier in the North Island and a member of the Labour Party. His political career, which featured many disputes and public clashes, was described as "stormy".

== Biography ==
=== Early years ===
Born in 1902, Armstrong was the son of Tim Armstrong and his wife Alice Fox. His father's parents were Irish immigrants to New Zealand. He was the Canterbury Featherweight Boxing Champion in 1923, won seven professional bouts in Australia, and represented Canterbury in rugby league. He was a mechanical and diesel engineer and joined the Amalgamated Society of Railway Servants union. He married Irene Gladys Nelson in 1929.

=== Political career ===
New Zealand Parliament
Years	Term	Electorate	Party
1943–1946	27th	Napier	Labour
1946–1949	28th	Napier	Labour
1949–1951	29th	Napier	Labour

Armstrong served two spells on the Christchurch City Council, the first between 1929 and 1935. In 1929 Armstrong was successful as an independent Socialist against the official Labour ticket. He believed the Christchurch City Council was neglecting the unemployed. Armstrong did not mince his words about the labour leadership to a large meeting in Sydenham: "they are ready to cry and shed tears with the unemployed when deputations wait on them, but when asked to do something decent they are found wanting". Though not returned as an independent Labourite in the 1935 election, primarily because preferential voting had been abolished, Armstrong still got over 11,000 votes.

He represented the Napier electorate from the 1943 general election, when he defeated Bill Barnard who had left the Labour Party to join John A. Lee’s Democratic Labour Party. Soon after entering parliament he also stood for Mayor of Napier as Labour's candidate, but was heavily defeated by incumbent Bill Hercock. At the bitter 1951 snap election he was defeated in an upset by National's Peter Tait, who had a majority of only 44.

After exiting parliament Armstrong moved back to Christchurch from Napier and resumed work as a railway engineer. He also joined the Canterbury branch of the Amalgamated Society of Railway Servants, of which he became secretary. In 1963 he was deposed as secretary and suspended from membership of the union after he publicly condemned a railway stoppage by union members and intended to stand for the national presidency of the union in order to call a halt to the issue, though his suspension (as intended) prevented him from doing so.

He later made a comeback to local politics and served another term as a member of the Christchurch City Council from 1962 to 1965, elected on the official Labour Party ticket. That year he was also elected to the Lyttelton Harbour Board. In 1965 however, he was expelled by the Labour Party after he crossed the floor on a party issue and voted with the Citizens' Association councillors. He proceeded to break all his ties with Labour and contested the 1965 election as an independent, but was unsuccessful. He finished behind all the Labour and Citizens' candidates, but still polled a respectable 5,083 votes. He also stood for the mayoralty, but garnered minimal support, finishing a distant third with only 497 votes.

Later, in the 1966 election, he renewed his opposition to Labour and stood as an independent against Mabel Howard (who was also a councillor at the time of his expulsion) in the Sydenham electorate.

=== Later life and death ===
Armstrong was later re-admitted to the Canterbury branch of the Amalgamated Society of Railway Servants, though he was barred from ever again holding any office within it.

He died in Christchurch on 21 November 1980, aged 78 years. He was survived by his wife and five children.

New Zealand Parliament
Preceded by Bill Barnard	Member of Parliament for Napier; 1943–1951	Succeeded by Peter Tait
