= Vigor Brown =

New Zealand politician (1854–1942)

Vigor Brown MP
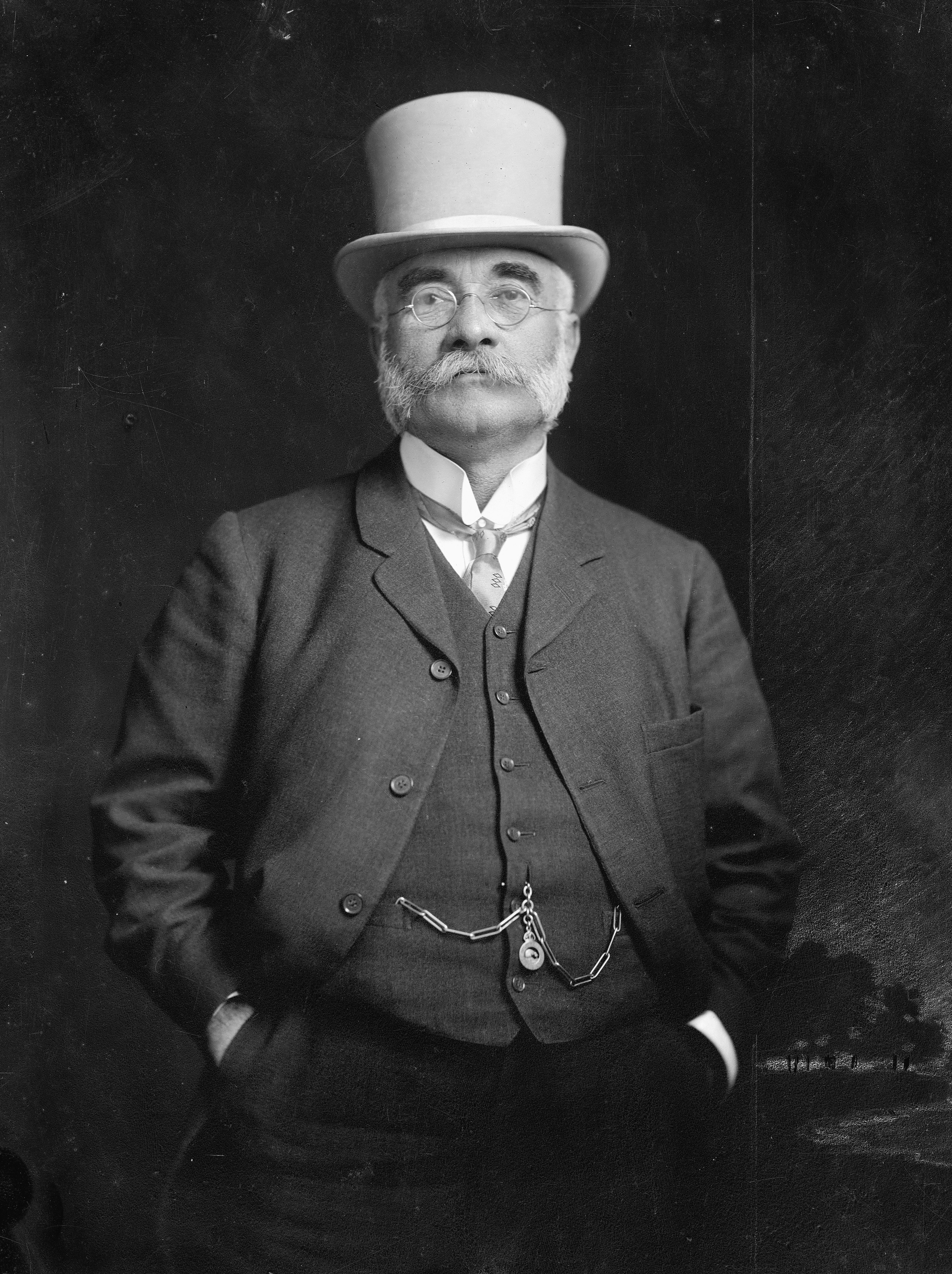
- Vigor Brown in 1910

Member of the New Zealand Parliament for Napier
- In office 17 November 1908 – 1922
- Preceded by: Alfred Fraser
- Succeeded by: Lew McIlvride

8th Mayor of Napier
- In office 1907–1917
- In office 1919–1921
- In office 1927–1933

Personal details
- Born: 18 June 1854 London
- Died: 2 September 1942 (aged 88) Napier
- Party: Liberal (1908–20); Reform (1920–25)
- Relations: James Drysdale Brown (brother)

John Vigor Brown (18 June 1854 – 2 September 1942), known as Vigor Brown, was a New Zealand Member of Parliament for Napier, in the North Island. He was Mayor of Napier for a total of 18 years. He was a well-known figure in his adopted city, a successful businessman, and involved in many clubs and organisations.

== Early life ==
Brown was born in London in 1854. He was the third boy and last child of Jessie Gilmour and John Brown. Both parents had Scottish ancestry. His father worked for a bank, and was later a commercial traveller. The family briefly lived in France before emigrating to Victoria, Australia. John Vigor Brown, his brothers and their mother arrived in Melbourne on 22 January 1862 on the Water Nymph. It is assumed that his father was already there. They made their home in South Yarra. He was educated at Melbourne Church of England Grammar School. James Drysdale Brown was an elder brother.

== Professional career ==
Brown learned the trade of a wholesale clothing merchant at the firm Sargood, King and Sargood in Melbourne. He came to Wellington in 1875. For two years, he worked for the Wellington firm of A. P. Stewart and Company as a travelling salesperson. His next employment brought him to Napier, where he remained for the rest of his life. He became branch manager for Archibald Clark and Sons, an importing company. He resigned from that position in May 1898 and took on the management of Neal and Close, where he was managing director at a later point. He formed his own company, J. Vigor Brown and Co. He was also managing director of White Swan Brewery, and Hawke's Bay Soap and Tannery. He was a director of the Napier Gas Company. He was the local agent for the United and Phoenix Fire Insurance Companies.

== Local body politics ==
He was voted onto both the Napier Harbour Board and the Napier Borough Council in 1898. He was chairman of the Harbour Board from February 1904 until April 1911. He was a member of the Chamber of Commerce.

He was elected Mayor of Napier in April 1907. He was mayor for three periods: 1907–1917, 1919–1921 and 1927–1933. The 1931 Hawke's Bay earthquake fell into Brown's last period, and temporary governance arrangements included a Napier Citizens' Control Committee, followed by a two-man Government Commission. J. S. Barton and L. B. Campbell were farewelled by the mayor in May 1933, when their term ended and the municipal affairs once again rested with the borough council. The resulting mayoral election was contested by the incumbent and C O Morse, the chairman of the Earthquake Relief Committee. The election caused great interest, and Morse and Brown received 4110 and 1808 votes respectively. At the time, mayoral elections were held every two years, but the 1931 election had been skipped due to the earthquake. While mayor, Brown was involved in the new Hawke's Bay Rugby League and helped them secure access to McLean Park in 1911.

== Member of Parliament ==
New Zealand Parliament
Years	Term	Electorate	Party
1908–1911	17th	Napier	Liberal
1911–1914	18th	Napier	Liberal
1914–1919	19th	Napier	Liberal
1919–1920	20th	Napier	Liberal
1920–1922	Changed allegiance to:		Reform

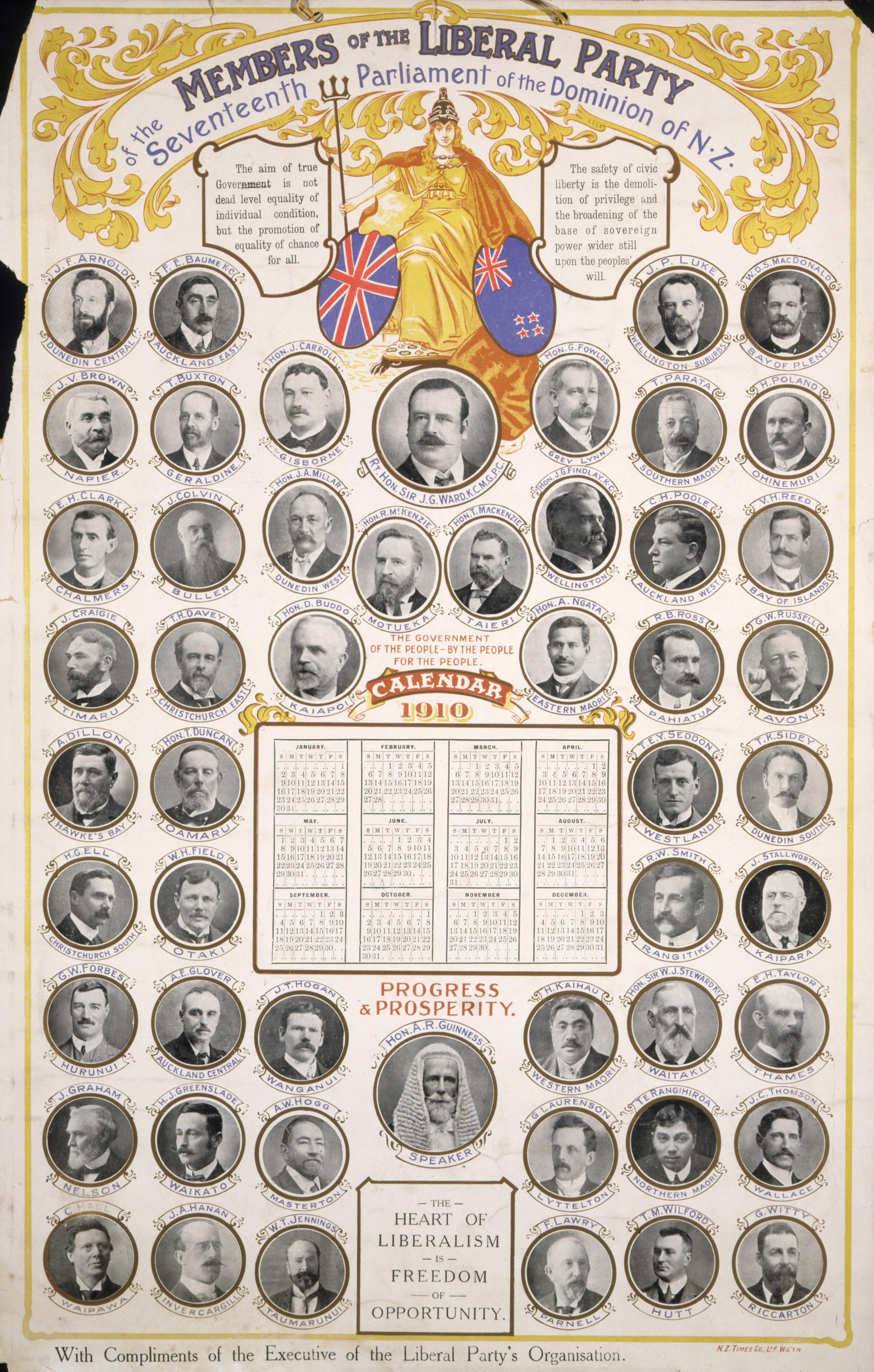
1910 calendar showing Liberal Party MPs; Brown is in the left column second from the top

The Napier electorate had been held since the 1899 election by Alfred Fraser. Fraser stood again in the 1908 election, but although he was with the Liberal Party, Brown also contested the electorate as a Liberal. Brown won the contest with a majority of 1035 votes (3803 votes to 2768).

In the 1911 election, Brown was challenged by Henry Hill. Both men were supporters of the current Liberal government. Brown and Hill received 3858 and 2825 votes, respectively.

Brown successfully contested the 1919 election for the Liberal Party, but the party's leader, Joseph Ward, failed to win re-election in the Awarua electorate. When Thomas Wilford became leader later in 1920, Brown objected and transferred his allegiance to the Reform Party.

Brown served in the New Zealand House of Representatives for fourteen years from 1908 to 1922. He contested the 1922 election as the official candidate for the Reform Party and came last of the four candidates. This was due to a split in the Reform vote. Prime Minister William Massey had given Brown the official party endorsement, despite the local Reform committee having already chosen John Mason as their candidate. Neither was victorious and the seat was won by Labour's Lew McIlvride.

In 1925, Brown failed to receive Reform nomination, with new party organizer Albert Davy ensuring it went to Mason. He later stood unsuccessfully as an independent in 1931.

== Family ==
Brown married Caroline Balaclava Cook, daughter of the late John Cook of Auckland, on 27 November 1880 at St John's Church in Napier. They had four daughters and two sons before Caroline died from peritonitis on 6 September 1891 at the young age of 36. He remarried on 19 September 1894 to Violet McConechie Bogle. There were no further children from this second marriage.

In 1910, Brown had a 31 feet (9.4 m) launch built for the family, named Water Nymph after the ship used for his emigration to Victoria during his childhood.

His second wife predeceased him on 23 February 1924. Brown died on 2 September 1942 in Napier, where he had lived since 1877. After his death, his family took on the surname Vigor-Brown.

== Notes ==
New Zealand Parliament
Preceded by Alfred Fraser	Member of Parliament for Napier; 1908–1922	Succeeded by Lew McIlvride
Political offices
Preceded by Samuel Carnell	Mayor of Napier; 1907–1917; 1919–1921; 1927–1933	Succeeded by Henry Hill
Preceded by Henry Hill	Mayor of Napier; 1907–1917; 1919–1921; 1927–1933	Succeeded by J B Andrew
Preceded by J B Andrew	Mayor of Napier; 1907–1917; 1919–1921; 1927–1933	Succeeded by C O Morse
