= Gordon Christie =

New Zealand politician

Gordon Christie MBE JP

Member of the New Zealand Parliament for Napier
- In office 26 November 1966 – 28 November 1981
- Preceded by: Jim Edwards
- Succeeded by: Geoff Braybrooke

Personal details
- Born: 27 August 1914 New Zealand
- Died: 13 June 2001 (aged 86) Taupō, New Zealand
- Party: Labour
- Spouse: Betty Bowers
- Children: 3
- Profession: Trade unionist

Gordon Christie MBE JP (27 August 1914 – 13 June 2001) was a New Zealand politician of the Labour Party.

== Biography ==
=== Early life and career ===
Christie was born on 27 August 1914. He received his education at Nelson Park School and Napier Technical College. He was on the executive of the North Island Waterfront Association for six years, and president of the Napier Watersiders Union for ten years from 1957 to 1967. He was a member of the Napier Port Conciliation Committee, and vice-chairman of the Napier Port Safety Committee. At the 1965 local body elections he stood for a seat on the Napier Harbour Board, but was unsuccessful.

=== Member of Parliament ===
New Zealand Parliament
Years	Term	Electorate	Party
1966–1969	35th	Napier	Labour
1969–1972	36th	Napier	Labour
1972–1975	37th	Napier	Labour
1975–1978	38th	Napier	Labour
1978–1981	39th	Napier	Labour

He represented the electorate of Napier in Parliament from 1966 to 1981, when he retired and was succeeded by Geoff Braybrooke. Both Christie and Braybrooke were described as Labour "stalwarts who effectively held the electorate in a tight grip".

During his time in parliament Christie was noted as a reliable and hard-working constituency member. Christie was responsible for the establishment of the Kennedy Park motel complex in Napier (consisting of motels, caravan sites, camp sites, and cabins) by putting a local Bill through the House. Parliamentary colleague Warren Freer described him as a solid and dependable MP who was a consistent and practical advocator for his constituents needing assistance as well as being a most conscientious select committee member. During the 1972–75 Parliament he was chairman of the Petitions select committee. He would constantly raise issues in caucus when policies would adversely affect the least fortunate in society. During the Third Labour Government (1972–75), together with Palmerston North MP Joe Walding, he coined the phrase "if it adversely effects them, it's bad policy".

After the surprise defeat of the Third Labour Government in 1975, Labour leader Bill Rowling designated Christie Shadow Minister of Police. In September 1977 he was part of the New Zealand delegation that attended the annual conference of the Commonwealth Parliamentary Association held in Ottawa.

=== Later life and death ===
In 1977, Christie was awarded the Queen Elizabeth II Silver Jubilee Medal. He was appointed a Member of the Order of the British Empire in the 1985 New Year Honours, for public and community service. In 1990, he was awarded the New Zealand 1990 Commemoration Medal.

Christie died at Taupō on 13 June 2001. He was predeceased by his wife Betty (née Bowers) (1924–1997), with whom he had three children.

== Notes ==
New Zealand Parliament
Preceded by Jim Edwards	Member of Parliament for Napier; 1966–1981	Succeeded by Geoff Braybrooke
