= Samuel Carnell =

New Zealand politician (1832–1920)

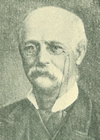

Member of the New Zealand Parliament for Napier
- In office 1893–1896
- Preceded by: George Swan
- Succeeded by: Douglas Maclean

7th Mayor of Napier
- In office 1904–1907
- Preceded by: Frederic Wanklyn Williams
- Succeeded by: Vigor Brown

Personal details
- Born: 1832
- Died: 14 October 1920 (aged 87–88)
- Party: Liberal

Samuel Carnell (1832 – 14 October 1920) was a Liberal Party Member of Parliament in Hawke's Bay, New Zealand.

== Member of Parliament ==
New Zealand Parliament
| Years | Term | Electorate | Party |
|---|---|---|---|
| 1893–1896 | 12th | Napier | Liberal |

He won the Napier electorate with the swing to the Liberals in 1893, but lost in 1896 to the conservative candidate.

== Mayor of Napier ==
He was the Mayor of Napier from 1904 to 1907.

New Zealand Parliament
| Preceded by George Swan | Member of Parliament for Napier; 1893–1896 | Succeeded by Douglas Maclean |
