= Alfred Fraser =

New Zealand politician

The Honourable Alfred Fraser
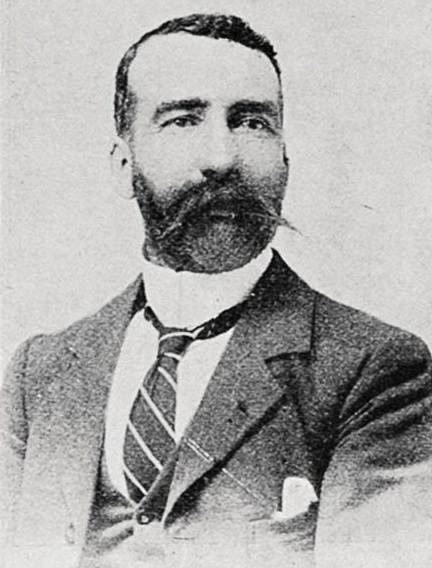

Member of the New Zealand Parliament for Napier
- In office 6 December 1899 – 17 November 1908
- Preceded by: Douglas Maclean
- Succeeded by: Vigor Brown

New Zealand Legislative Councillor
- In office 7 May 1918 – 24 February 1919†
- Appointed by: Sir Joseph Ward

Personal details
- Born: Alfred Levavasour Durell Fraser; 1863 Kaiapoi, New Zealand
- Died: 24 February 1919 (aged 57) Hastings, New Zealand
- Party: Liberal

Alfred Levavasour Durell Fraser (1863 – 24 February 1919) was a Liberal Party Member of Parliament in New Zealand.

== Early life and family ==
Fraser was born in Kaiapoi, Canterbury, in 1863 to John Marchant Fraser. He later settled in Hawke's Bay in 1881, and began a career in school-teaching for some years. Fraser then moved to Hastings, where he entered into Native Land Court advocacy. On 29 December 1892 he married Emily Teresa Dennett, the daughter of William Young Dennett who later served as mayor of Hastings.

== Political career ==
New Zealand Parliament
Years	Term	Electorate	Party
1899–1902	14th	Napier	Liberal
1902–1905	15th	Napier	Liberal
1905–1908	16th	Napier	Liberal

In the 1896 election, he unsuccessfully contested the Hawke's Bay electorate against the incumbent, William Russell. He was elected to the Napier electorate in the 1899 general election, which he represented to 1908 when he was defeated by fellow Liberal Vigor Brown.

In 1905 the local branch of the Liberal and Labour Federation claimed Fraser was ignoring his constituents and they chose to endorse William James McGrath instead. It was one of many instances in that years election of vote splitting amongst the Liberals.

in 1911, Fraser stood as an independent for Hawke's Bay 'to support or oppose measures as his principles directed' and said he would only support Joseph Ward's ministry if it did what he himself thought was right. He was unsuccessful. Fraser's name was also on the ballot for the Hawkes Bay by-election in 1917. However he retired from the contest, yet 9 votes were still cast for him. In May 1918, he was appointed to the Legislative Council. He served until his death at Hastings on 24 February 1919. He was buried at Hastings Cemetery.

== Notes ==
New Zealand Parliament
Preceded by Douglas Maclean	Member of Parliament for Napier; 1899–1908	Succeeded by Vigor Brown
