= Charles Fountaine =

Royal Navy admiral (1879–1946)

Vice-Admiral Charles Andrew Fountaine, CB, DL, JP (25 May 1879 – 24 March 1946) was a Royal Navy officer during the First World War.

Fountaine was born at Narford Hall, Norfolk. He joined the Royal Navy in 1893, and was a Lieutenant when in early 1900 he was posted to the destroyer HMS Fairy, serving in the Devonport Instructional flotilla. He later served with distinction during the First World War, first as a gunnery officer on HMS Lion, and latterly in command of HMS Cambrian. He was Naval Aide de Camp to King George V from 1925 to 1926. He was appointed High Sheriff of Norfolk in March 1946, just before his death.

He was appointed a Companion of the Order of the Bath (CB) in the 1923 Birthday Honours.

He married Louisa Constance Catherine (31 August 1890 – 28 December 1968) in 1918. She was the younger daughter of Sir Douglas Maclean, of Hawke's Bay in New Zealand. The Neo-Nazi Andrew Fountaine was their son.
