= Bill Barnard =

New Zealand politician

The Honourable Bill Barnard CBE
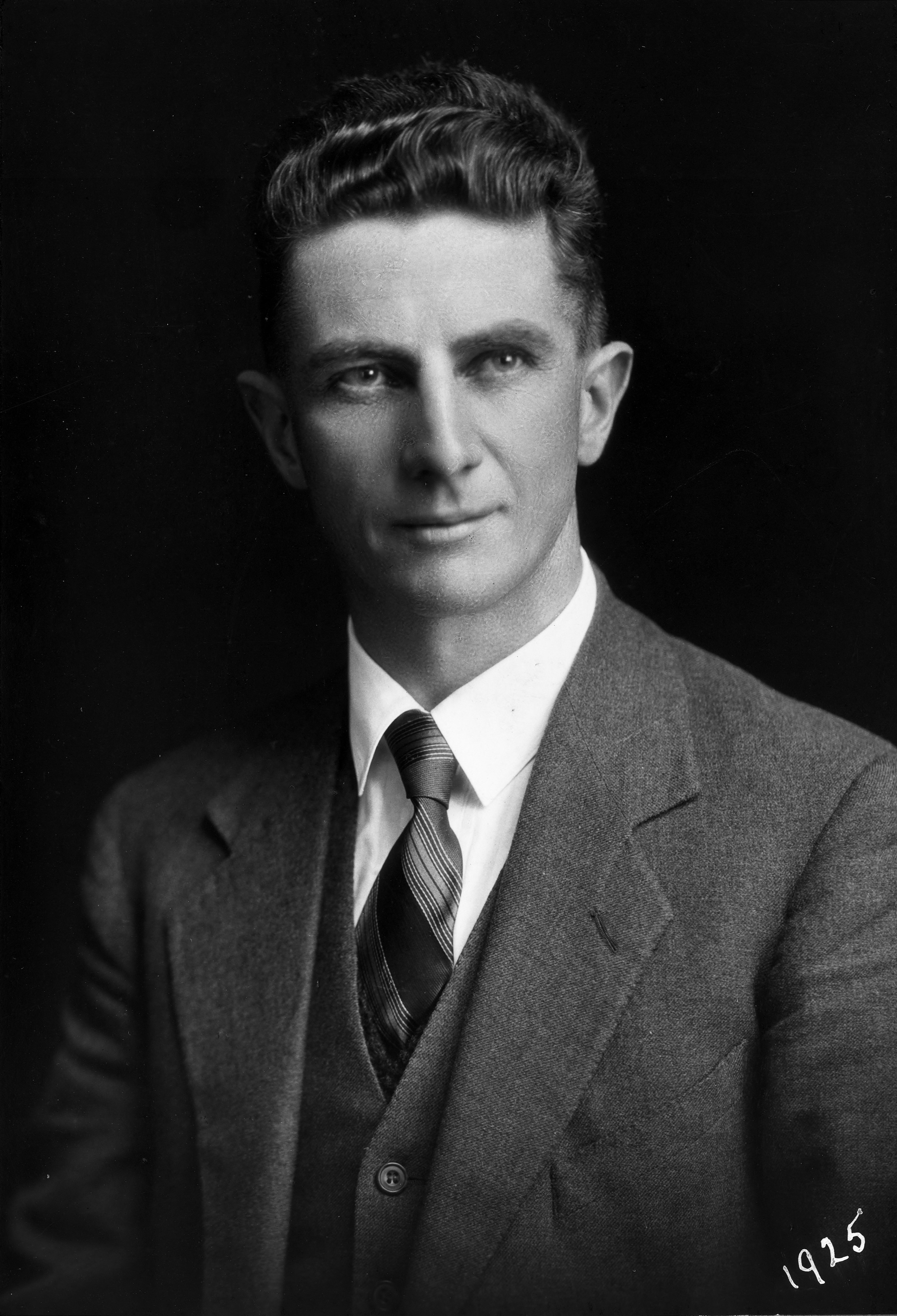
- Barnard in 1925

10th Speaker of the New Zealand House of Representatives
- In office 25 March 1936 – 25 September 1943
- Prime Minister: Michael Joseph Savage†; Peter Fraser
- Preceded by: Charles Statham
- Succeeded by: Bill Schramm

Member of the New Zealand Parliament for Napier
- In office 14 November 1928 – 25 September 1943
- Preceded by: John Mason
- Succeeded by: Tommy Armstrong

Personal details
- Born: William Edward Barnard; 29 January 1886 Carterton, New Zealand
- Died: 12 March 1958 (aged 72) Auckland, New Zealand
- Party: Labour; Democratic Labour Party

Military service
- Allegiance: New Zealand Army
- Years of service: 1916–18
- Rank: Gunner
- Battles/wars: World War I

William Edward Barnard CBE (29 January 1886 – 12 March 1958) was a New Zealand lawyer, politician and parliamentary speaker. He was a member of Parliament from 1928 until 1943, and was its Speaker from 1936 till 1943. He was known for his association with John A. Lee, a prominent left-wing politician.

== Early life ==
Barnard was born in Carterton, a town in the Wairarapa region. He studied law at Victoria University College, and became a lawyer in 1908. He eventually settled in Te Aroha, where he served on the borough council. In 1915, he travelled to the United Kingdom and joined the Royal Army Medical Corps to serve in World War I. After serving for a time in Egypt, he became a gunner in the Royal Field Artillery, serving in Palestine. Following World War I, he returned to New Zealand and resumed practice as a lawyer.

== Parliamentary career ==
New Zealand Parliament
Years	Term	Electorate	Party
1928–1931	23rd	Napier	Labour
1931–1935	24th	Napier	Labour
1935–1938	25th	Napier	Labour
1938–1940	26th	Napier	Labour
1940–1943	Changed allegiance to:		Democratic Labour

Becoming increasingly interested in left-wing politics, Barnard joined the young Labour Party in 1923. He was a good friend of John A. Lee, one of the more radical members of the Labour Party. Barnard rose quickly, being elected to the Labour Party's national executive in 1924. In the 1925 election, he was Labour's candidate in the Kaipara seat – the incumbent was Gordon Coates, the Prime Minister, and Barnard was unsuccessful. In the 1928 elections, he stood in the seat of Napier, and narrowly defeated the incumbent Reform Party MP.

In 1935, he was awarded the King George V Silver Jubilee Medal.

In the 1935 election, he was returned with a comfortable majority, perhaps assisted by his work in response to the Napier earthquake. When the Labour Party won power in 1935, many believed that he would be appointed Minister of Justice. In the end, however, this position was given to Rex Mason. Instead, Barnard was nominated as Speaker of the House. He was elected to this position in March 1936. In the 1938 election, he was challenged in the Napier electorate by John Ormond of the National Party, but he won with a large majority.

Politically, Barnard was on the left of the Labour Party, and was strongly influenced by the social credit theory of monetary reform. He was also a strong Anglican, and considered himself to be a Christian socialist. Barnard became known as one of the senior members of the left-leaning, creditist faction of the party, although his old friend John A. Lee was the faction's de facto leader. As Lee's relationship with the Labour Party leadership deteriorated, Barnard sided with Lee. Lee was eventually expelled, and after Peter Fraser, an opponent of Lee, was elected leader on 4 April 1940, Barnard himself resigned from the party.

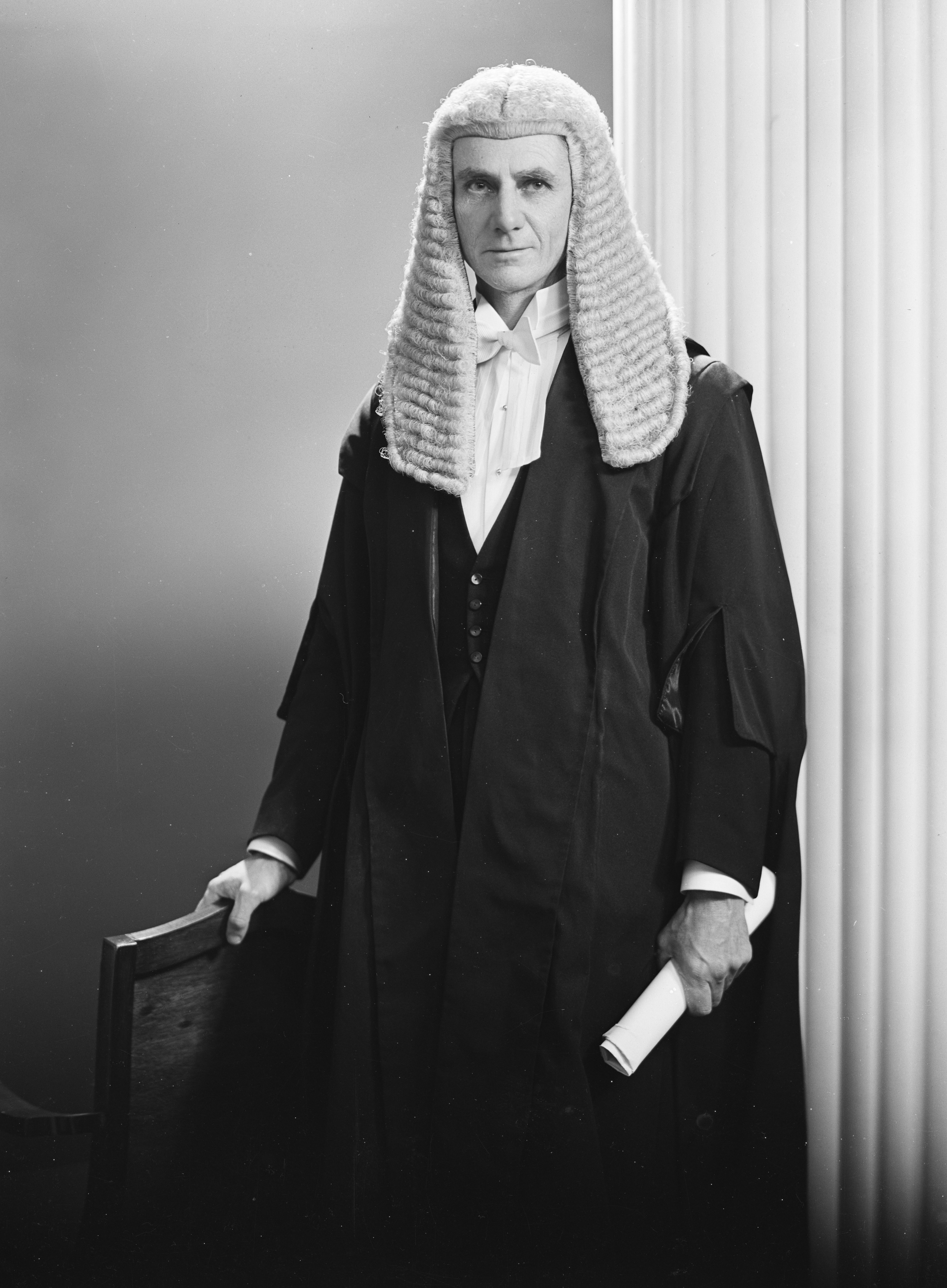
Barnard in Speakers robes, 1930s

Barnard then assisted Lee in the launch of the new Democratic Labour Party, becoming one of its two MPs. Despite his departure from the governing party, he retained the office of Speaker. Soon, however, Barnard became dissatisfied with Lee's style of leadership, considering it to be egotistical and autocratic. Rather than seek re-election as a Democratic Labour Party candidate, he opted to stand as an independent, but was defeated.

== Later life ==
Following his departure from Parliament, Barnard returned to law, setting up a legal practice in Tauranga. In 1950, he became mayor, serving for two years. The workload of his mayoral duties combined with those of his legal practice had begun to negatively affect his health and he resigned before the completion of the term necessitating a by-election.

Barnard also undertook considerable work with various non-profit organisations, including the Society for Closer Relations with the USSR (Russia), the Institute of Pacific Relations's New Zealand branch, the New Zealand Five Million Club (promoting population growth), and the New Zealand Council for the Adoption of Chinese Refugee Children. For the latter, he was awarded the Order of the Brilliant Star by the government of the Republic of China. In 1953, he was awarded the Queen Elizabeth II Coronation Medal. In the 1957 New Year Honours, he was appointed a Commander of the Order of the British Empire, for political and public services.

Barnard died in Auckland on 12 March 1958.

New Zealand Parliament
Preceded by John Mason	Member of Parliament for Napier; 1928–1943	Succeeded by Tommy Armstrong
Political offices
Preceded by Charles Statham	Speaker of the New Zealand House of Representatives; 1936–1943	Succeeded by Bill Schramm
Preceded by Lionel Roberts Wilkinson	Mayor of Tauranga; 1950–1952	Succeeded by Lionel Roberts Wilkinson
