= Geoff Braybrooke =

New Zealand politician

Geoff Braybrooke QSO JP

Member of the New Zealand Parliament for Napier
- In office 28 November 1981 – 27 July 2002
- Preceded by: Gordon Christie
- Succeeded by: Russell Fairbrother

Personal details
- Born: 4 April 1935 Gillingham, Kent, England
- Died: 9 March 2013 (aged 77) Palmerston North, New Zealand
- Party: Labour
- Spouses: Janice Cater (m. 1959; died 1998) Beth Marlow (m. 1999; died 2013)
- Children: 2

Military service
- Allegiance: British Army; New Zealand Army
- Years of service: 1952–1955; 1957–1970
- Rank: Warrant Officer
- Battles/wars: Korean War; Malayan Emergency; Vietnam War

Geoffrey Bernard Braybrooke QSO JP (4 April 1935 – 9 March 2013) was a New Zealand politician. He was a member of the New Zealand Parliament from 1981 to 2002, representing the Labour Party. He was notably one of the party's more socially conservative MPs.

== Biography ==
=== Early life and career ===
Braybrooke was born in Gillingham, Kent, England, on 4 April 1935, the son of Geoff and Edith Braybrooke, and was educated at Chatham House Grammar School in Ramsgate. It was the same school that future Prime Minister of the United Kingdom Edward Heath had attended. He attended Chatham House after he won a state scholarship and there was exposed to snobbery and exclusion by fellow students as he came from a working class family.

He joined the Royal Army Medical Corps in 1952 and served in the Korean War. In 1955, he became a police officer in London, but in 1957, he chose to move to New Zealand and re-enter the army. Braybrooke reminisced about emigrating: "I became a New Zealand citizen in 1958 and I never regretted it. I am a Kiwi by choice, not by an accident of birth. It started when I was in the Metropolitan Police and I was standing at Charing Cross in the pouring rain directing traffic. I was nearly run over a bus and later I had three pub fights to sort out. I walked past New Zealand House, which was in the Strand then, and it looked so good that I went in and made enquiries. I had to join the Army again to be accepted."

He served in the Royal New Zealand Army Medical Corps from 1957 until 1970. During his military career, he served in the Malayan Emergency and Vietnam War as a Warrant Officer. Despite serving there, he was firmly of the opinion that New Zealand should never have gotten itself involved in the Vietnam War stating "I saw all the horror and filth of war and read all the rubbish that was written about it back here and it was all to support corrupt officials. We weren't supporting democracy, we were protecting people who flew out of Vietnam with bags of gold. It was a fascist regime and a communist regime having a go at each other. But, for all that, I am not a pacifist. I believe in a strong, well-trained and well-equipped army for New Zealand's defence. But it should be for self-defence only. I do not believe in fighting other people's wars for them. I know it is hard to spend money on an army when people are going without, but New Zealand cannot afford to become defenceless." He blamed his ill-health in later life on the effects of Agent Orange in Vietnam.

In 1959, Braybrooke married Janice Cater, and the couple went on to have two children. He represented the New Zealand Army in both soccer and basketball and was later an official with the New Zealand Amateur Athletics Association. After leaving the army, he became a sales manager for a pharmaceutical research company until 1980.

=== Member of Parliament ===
New Zealand Parliament
Years	Term	Electorate	List	Party
1981–1984	40th	Napier		Labour
1984–1987	41st	Napier		Labour
1987–1990	42nd	Napier		Labour
1990–1993	43rd	Napier		Labour
1993–1996	44th	Napier		Labour
1996–1999	45th	Napier	none	Labour
1999–2002	45th	Napier	none	Labour

Braybrooke had joined the British Labour Party when only fourteen years old, and when he moved to New Zealand, he became a supporter of the New Zealand Labour Party. In the 1969 elections, he managed Mick Connelly's campaign in the Wigram seat. He then unsuccessfully contested the seats of Franklin, Pakuranga, and Papakura in the 1972 elections, 1975 elections, and the 1978 elections, respectively. He also made an abortive attempt to become Labour's candidate for the 1977 Mangere by-election. In the 1981 elections, he was finally elected MP for Napier.

Upon entering Parliament he stated his support for the armed forces, opposition to abortion and his desire for the Labour Party to return to what it stood for under previous leader Norman Kirk (whom he admired greatly). In 1983 he was appointed as Labour's spokesperson for War Pensions and Rehabilitation by Labour leader David Lange.

During the controversial Fourth Labour Government Braybrooke was chairman of the communications and road safety select committee. After the defeat of the government in 1990 he was appointed Shadow Minister of Transport and Disabilities by leader Mike Moore. He supported Moore when he was successfully challenged by Helen Clark after Labour narrowly lost the 1993 election. Subsequently he was appointed Shadow Minister of Defence and Veterans Affairs by Clark.

Braybrooke was one of the more socially conservative members of the Labour Party and was at times he was offside with liberal-minded colleagues. According to Braybrooke his affiliation with Labour was attributed to his working class background stating in 1982 "My background was as poor as a church mouse's. I know what it is like to labour away and be broke at the end of the week and have to go without." In 1985, when his fellow Labour MP Fran Wilde attempted to overturn legal prohibitions against homosexuality, Braybrooke was active in campaigning against the change, and later opposed measures promoted by National's Katherine O'Regan to combat discrimination on the grounds of sexual orientation. In 2011, near the end of his life, he said that his views had changed and he had come to accept the gay community. He opposed Helen Clark's rise to the Labour Party's leadership, remaining strongly loyal to her predecessor, Mike Moore. This led him to be involved in the failed discussions during 1995 & 1996 about forming a new breakaway party led by Moore. When he retired from politics, however, he praised Clark in his valedictory speech as "one of the great Labour leaders," and said with regard to his vote for Moore over her that "It just shows that we can all make mistakes and we can all learn. I mean that sincerely."

Throughout his career in Parliament, Braybrooke never had ambition to hold any ministerial roles, but did serve as Deputy Speaker and Labour defence spokesperson. Soon after entering parliament he stated his ideal role would have been a Labour government's Senior Whip stating "I think I would be well suited to being a senior whip. There are similarities between a whip and a sergeant major." He held the Napier seat until his retirement at the 2002 elections.

=== Later life and death ===
He died at North Arohanui Hospital in Palmerston North in 2013 and was laid to rest after a funeral at St Mary's Anglican Church at Levin.

== Honours and recognition ==
He was an appointed a Justice of the Peace in 1970. In 1990, Braybrooke was awarded the New Zealand 1990 Commemoration Medal. Following his retirement from Parliament, he was appointed a Companion of the Queen's Service Order for public services, in the 2003 New Year Honours.

== Notes ==
New Zealand Parliament
Preceded by Gordon Christie	Member of Parliament for Napier; 1981–2002	Succeeded by Russell Fairbrother
