= Jim Edwards (New Zealand politician) =

New Zealand politician

Jim Edwards QSM JP

Member of the New Zealand Parliament for Napier
- In office 13 November 1954 – 26 November 1966
- Preceded by: Peter Tait
- Succeeded by: Gordon Christie

Personal details
- Born: 24 February 1927 Sydney, New South Wales, Australia
- Died: 5 April 2010 (aged 83) Mandurah, Western Australia, Australia
- Party: Labour
- Spouse: Alison Nordmeyer
- Relations: Arnold Nordmeyer (father-in-law)
- Children: 2
- Education: Victoria University
- Profession: Management consultant

James Gladstone Edwards QSM JP (24 February 1927 – 5 April 2010) was a member of parliament for Napier, in the North Island of New Zealand.

== Biography ==
=== Early life and career ===
Edwards was born in Sydney in 1927. His family moved to New Zealand when he was a child and settled in Napier. He attended Napier Boys' High School before going to Victoria University College where he graduated with a Master of Arts. He then attended Wellington Teachers' College from 1945 to 1946 before becoming a teacher from 1947 to 1952. He then left teaching to take up a position as a lands and deeds clerk at the Department of Justice from 1953 to 1954.

=== Political career ===
New Zealand Parliament
Years	Term	Electorate	Party
1954–1957	31st	Napier	Labour
1957–1960	32nd	Napier	Labour
1960–1963	33rd	Napier	Labour
1963–1966	34th	Napier	Labour

Edwards joined the Labour Party in 1949 and became secretary of the Woodville branch of the party and from 1951 to 1952 he was a member of the Pahiatua Labour Representation Committee. He then moved to Napier and was elected vice-president of the Napier branch in 1953 and also a member of the Napier Labour Representation Committee.

Edwards was the MP for Napier for 12 years from 1954 to 1966. From 1956 to 1957 he was a member of the Labour Party's national executive. Edwards earned a reputation as a hardworking politician who had particularly strong inclinations to improving educational facilities. He was a staunch supporter of Arnold Nordmeyer (his father-in-law) as leader and attempted to manage the backbench MPs on Nordmeyer's behalf. His attempts backfired when his interactions became too heavy handed which grew the anti-Nordmeyer sentiment in the caucus. Alongside Bill Rowling, he was the only younger member of the caucus who supported Nordmeyer when he was challenged, successfully, for the leadership by Norman Kirk in 1965.

Due to his overzealous support for the now ex-leader Edwards soon found his relationships in caucus strained. In June 1966 he announced he would not stand for re-election for both personal reasons and as a matter of principle. Edwards was concerned with the increasing union domination of the party. He was expelled from the Labour Party the following year for having publicly claimed that militant unionists were putting pressure on representation committees. According to Edwards he was expelled without trial and had not been invited to meet with executive before he received a letter informing him that his membership had been terminated.

=== Later life and death ===
After exiting parliament he became public relations manager for Unilever New Zealand. He then became a management consultant based in Miramar, Wellington. He rejoined the Labour Party and in 1977 he unsuccessfully stood for the Wellington City Council on a Labour Party ticket. Ahead of the 1978 election he was an aspirant for the Labour nomination in the Island Bay electorate (which Nordmeyer had previously been the MP for) after the then MP, Gerald O'Brien, faced questions around his re-selection viability. He was not selected with the nomination going instead to Frank O'Flynn, the former MP for Kapiti.

He was awarded the New Zealand 1990 Commemoration Medal, and the Queen's Service Medal for public services in the 1994 Queen's Birthday Honours.

A former resident of Island Bay, Wellington and Raumati, he then moved to Mandurah, Western Australia. He died at his Mandurah home in 2010 after a period of illness.

== Personal life ==
In 1956 Edwards married Alison Nordmeyer, the daughter of senior Labour MP Arnold Nordmeyer, with whom he had one son and one daughter.

== Notes ==
New Zealand Parliament
Preceded by Peter Tait	Member of Parliament for Napier; 1954–1966	Succeeded by Gordon Christie
