= Chris Tremain =

New Zealand politician

The Honourable Chris Tremain
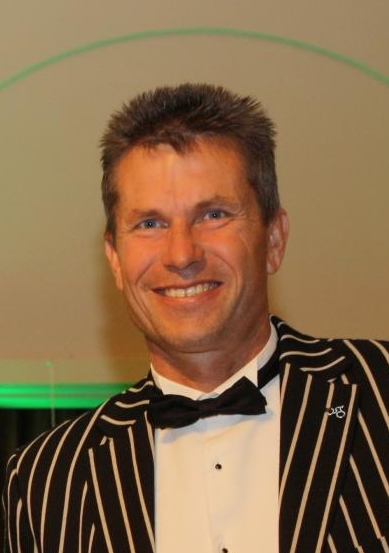
- Chris Tremain in 2012

Member of the New Zealand Parliament for Napier
- In office 5 October 2005 – 20 August 2014
- Preceded by: Russell Fairbrother
- Succeeded by: Stuart Nash
- Majority: 3,701

34th Minister of Internal Affairs
- In office 3 April 2012 – 28 January 2014
- Preceded by: Amy Adams
- Succeeded by: Peter Dunne

16th Minister of Local Government
- In office 31 January 2013 – 28 January 2014
- Preceded by: David Carter
- Succeeded by: Paula Bennett

Associate Minister of Tourism
- In office 14 December 2011 – 28 January 2014
- Preceded by: Jonathan Coleman
- Succeeded by: Todd McClay

Senior Government Whip
- In office 15 June 2009 – 12 December 2011
- Preceded by: Nathan Guy
- Succeeded by: Louise Upston

Minister of Civil Defence
- In office 12 December 2011 – 3 April 2012
- Preceded by: Craig Foss
- Succeeded by: Nikki Kaye

Personal details
- Born: Christopher James Tremain; 1966 (age 59–60) Napier, New Zealand
- Party: National
- Spouse: Angela Tremain
- Children: 3
- Profession: Accounting, real estate investor

Christopher James Tremain (born 1966) is a New Zealand businessman and retired politician. He served as member of the New Zealand House of Representatives for the National Party from 2005 until his retirement in 2014.

== Family and personal life ==
Born in Napier in 1966, Tremain attended Taradale Primary School, Taradale Intermediate, Napier Boys' High School and Massey University. He obtained a Bachelor of Business Studies in accounting and a Diploma of Business Studies in marketing.

He has owned and operated a number of businesses in the Hawke's Bay region, including Tremain Real Estate, Tremain Travel and Colliers International.

Tremain's father was All Black flanker and Hawke's Bay Rugby Union captain Kel Tremain.

Tremain and his wife, Angela, have three children. He has been the driver of a number of community events including the annual Tremain Corporate Triathlon.

== Member of Parliament ==
New Zealand Parliament
Years	Term	Electorate	List	Party
2005–2008	48th	Napier	52	National
2008–2011	49th	Napier	31	National
2011–2014	50th	Napier	22	National

Tremain was first elected to parliament in the 2005 election, when he won the Napier electorate, beating incumbent Russell Fairbrother by 3951 votes. This was the first time that National had won Napier for more than 50 years.

In the 2008 election, Tremain retained the electorate with an increased majority.

After the election of the 50th New Zealand Parliament, Tremain was appointed a Minister outside Cabinet taking over the roles of Civil Defence from John Carter and Craig Foss, and the role of Consumer Affairs which had been held until the election by Simon Power.

He was replaced as Chief Whip of the National party by Michael Woodhouse, a List MP based in Dunedin. On 3 April 2012 Chris Tremain was promoted into Cabinet following the resignation of Nick Smith and gained the portfolio of Internal Affairs.

On 30 September 2013 Tremain announced that he would not contest the 2014 election. On resigning his ministerial posts on 28 January 2014, Tremain was granted retention of the title of The Honourable for life.

New Zealand Parliament
Preceded by Russell Fairbrother	Member of Parliament for Napier; 2005–2014	Succeeded by Stuart Nash
Political offices
Preceded by David Carter	Minister of Local Government; 2013–2014	Succeeded by Paula Bennett
Preceded by John Boscawen	Minister of Consumer Affairs; 2012–2014	Succeeded by Paul Goldsmith
Preceded by Amy Adams	Minister of Internal Affairs; 2012–2014	Succeeded by Peter Dunne
Preceded by Jonathan Coleman	Associate Minister of Tourism; 2011–2014	Succeeded by Paula Bennett
