= Mayor of Napier =

Head of a New Zealand council

- Coat of arms of Napier
- Incumbent; Richard McGrath since 2025
- Style: His/Her Worship
- Term length: Three years, renewable
- Inaugural holder: Robert Stuart
- Formation: 1875; 151 years ago
- Deputy: Graeme Taylor
- Website: Official website

The mayor of Napier is the head of the municipal government of Napier, New Zealand, and presides over the Napier City Council. Napier is New Zealand's ninth largest city. The first mayor was elected in 1875. The current mayor is Richard McGrath.

== History ==
The Māori sold a block of land called Ahuriri in 1851, and in 1853 Donald McLean bought the site that later became Napier. Alfred Domett, a future Prime Minister of New Zealand, was appointed as the Commissioner of Crown Lands and the resident magistrate at the village of Ahuriri. It was decided to place a planned town here, its streets and avenues were laid out, and the new town named for Sir Charles Napier.

The area initially fell under the control of the Wellington Province. The New Provinces Act, 1858 created the Hawke's Bay Province and Napier became its capital. Superintendent John Davies Ormond worked towards Napier becoming self-governing, and it was designated as a borough in 1874. The first election for a borough council were held on 18 January 1875. Nine councillors were elected from 22 contestants, and the councillors chose Robert Stuart from their group as their first mayor. Stuart was mayor until December 1878.

John Vautier succeeded Stuart from December 1878 until May 1882. At the first borough election in 1875, he had been the highest polling councillor. He was succeeded by Dr William Isaac Spencer from June 1882 to December 1885.

George Swan began his long mayoralty in December 1885. He held it until April 1901; at that time, he had the longest continuous mayoralty in New Zealand.

John McVay succeeded Swan and was mayor from April 1901 to April 1902. Frederic Wanklyn Williams was mayor in 1902–1904.

Samuel Carnell succeeded McVay in 1904. He was mayor until 1907.

Vigor Brown was first elected mayor in 1907. During this first period, he retained the mayoralty for ten years until 1917. He was succeeded by Henry Hill, who had made his name in the Hawke's Bay as a school inspector and educationalist. Hill held the mayoralty from 1917 to 1919. Brown had a second period as mayor from 1919 to 1921, and was succeeded by J B Andrew from 1921 to 1927. Brown succeeded Andrew for his third period, this time from 1927 to 1933. The 1931 Hawke's Bay earthquake fell into Brown's last period, and temporary governance arrangement included a Napier Citizens' Control Committee, followed by a two-man Government Commission. John Barton and L. B. Campbell were farewelled by the mayor in May 1933, when their term ended and the municipal affairs once again rested with the borough council. The resulting mayoral election was contested by the incumbent and C O Morse, the chairman of the Earthquake Relief Committee. The election caused great interest, and Morse and Brown received 4110 and 1808 votes, respectively. At the time, mayoral elections were held every two years, but the 1931 election had been skipped due to the earthquake.

Morse was mayor until 1938, defeated by Bill Hercock who had a twelve-year term (1938–1950). E R Spriggs succeeded Hercock from 1950 to 1956.

Peter Tait was mayor from 1956 to 1974. He was knighted the year after he ceased being mayor.

Barbara Arnott was first elected in 2001. Bill Dalton succeeded her in 2013.

=== Members of Parliament ===
Four Napier mayors have also served as Members of Parliament. All four represented the Napier electorate in the House of Representatives:

- George Swan (1890–1893)
- Samuel Carnell (1893–1896)
- Vigor Brown (1908–1922)
- Peter Tait (1951–1951)

== List of mayors ==
	Name	Image	Term	Notes
1	Robert Stuart		1875–1878	short bio
2	John Vautier		1878–1882	short bio
3	Dr William Isaac Spencer		1882–1885	short bio
4	George Swan		1885–1901	
5	John C. McVay		1901–1902	short bio
6	Frederic Williams		1902–1904	autobiography
7	Samuel Carnell		1904–1907	short bio
8	Vigor Brown		1907–1917	short bio
9	Henry Hill		1917–1919	
(8)	Vigor Brown		1919–1921	second period
10	John Blight Andrew		1921–1927	obituary
(8)	Vigor Brown		1927–1933	third period
11	Charles Ormond Morse		1933–1938	
12	Bill Hercock		1938–1950	
13	Ron Spriggs		1950–1956	
14	Sir Peter Tait		1956–1974	
15	Clyde Jeffery		1974–1983	cemetery
16	Dave Prebensen		1983–1989	
17	Alan Dick		1989–2001	
18	Barbara Arnott		2001–2013	
19	Bill Dalton		2013–2019	
20	Kirsten Wise		2019–2025	
21	Richard McGrath		2025–present	

== Deputy mayor ==
=== McGrath appointments ===
In October 2025, newly elected mayor Richard McGrath chose third-term councillor Sally Crown to be his deputy mayor. On 23 February 2026, McGrath asked Crown to resign as deputy mayor or be removed, claiming a breakdown in their relationship. On 24 February 2026, after Crown refused to resign, McGrath stood her down as his deputy. Later in February, McGrath named first-term councillor Roger Brownlie as deputy mayor. However, following a meeting between McGrath and councillors, Brownlie resigned from the role and in March councillors elected sixth-term councillor Graeme Taylor as deputy mayor.

=== List ===
^{†} Died in office

Name	Term	Mayor
H. P. Cohen	c. July 1902	Williams
H. P. Cohen	c. May 1903	Williams
H. P. Cohen	c. March 1904	Williams
M. W. P. Lascelles	c. July 1904	Carnell
M. W. P. Lascelles	1904–1905	Carnell
William James McGrath	fl.1905	Carnell
James Spence	1906–c. 1907	Carnell
William Plowman	c. 1908–1917	Brown
Arthur McCarthy	1917–1918^{[†]}	Hill
P. Ashcroft	1918–1923	Hill
P. Ashcroft	1918–1923	Brown
P. Ashcroft	1918–1923	Andrew
P. Ashcroft	1918–1923	Andrew
William James McGrath	1923–1925	Andrew
Clement Roy Spackman	1925–1927	Andrew
R. W. Goodger	1927–1933	Brown
Alfred Ernest Bedford	1933–1934	Morse
A. H. Ferguson (acting)	1934	Morse
Alfred Ernest Bedford	1934–1935	Morse
A. H. D. Mayne	1935–1938	Morse
Alfred Ernest Bedford	1938–1947	Hercock
H. W. Dowling	1947–1950	Hercock
P. Mooney	1950–?	Spriggs
Unknown	c. 1950–1956	Spriggs
Wally Atherfold	1956–1962	Tait
Peter Cox	1962–1974	Tait
Peggy Higgins	1974–?	Jeffery
Dave Prebensen	1980–1983	Jeffery
Peter Tong	1983–1986	Prebensen
Alan Dick	1986	Prebensen
David Marshall	1986–1989	Prebensen
Anne Tolley	1989–1995	Dick
Ian Dick	1995–2001	Dick
Kathie Furlong	2001–2013	Arnott
Faye White	2013–2019	Dalton
Annette Brosnan	2019–2025	Wise
Sally Crown	2025–2026	McGrath
Roger Brownlie	2026	McGrath
Graeme Taylor	2026–present	McGrath
