= Frederic Williams (businessman) =

New Zealand businessman (1854–1940)

Frederic Wanklyn Williams
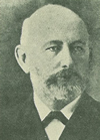

6th Mayor of Napier
- In office 1902–1904
- Preceded by: John McVay
- Succeeded by: Samuel Carnell

Personal details
- Born: 1854 Whakato, East Coast, New Zealand
- Died: 1940 (aged 85–86)

Frederic Wanklyn Williams (1854–1940) was a New Zealand business proprietor, company director and community leader. He was born in Whakato, East Coast, New Zealand in 1854.

F W Williams was the eldest child of the Bishop of Waiapu. With Nathaniel Kettle he founded the stock and station agency, importers and general merchants Williams & Kettle with its headquarters in Napier.

From 1902 he served briefly as Mayor of Napier while he steered through a new loan to help develop the town. That done he resigned from the mayoralty in 1904 returning to his commercial interests but retaining his community involvement in the local harbour board between 1889 and 1919 together with the Hawke's Bay A & P Society as chairman and giving eight years service on the Hawke's Bay Education Board. .
