= Lionel Wilkinson =

New Zealand soldier and politician (1887–1976)

19th Mayor of Tauranga
- In office 28 October 1952 – 28 November 1956
- Preceded by: Bill Barnard
- Succeeded by: David Mitchell
- In office 16 May 1935 – 22 November 1950
- Preceded by: Alfred Francis Daly Tunks
- Succeeded by: Bill Barnard

Personal details
- Born: 20 May 1887 England
- Died: 4 December 1976 (aged 89)
- Occupation: Farmer

Lionel Roberts Wilkinson JP (20 May 1887 − 4 December 1976) was a New Zealand soldier and politician. He was Mayor of Tauranga for 19 years.

== Early life and career ==
Wilkinson was born in England in 1887 and was educated at Leeds Higher Grade School. He played first fifteen school rugby and was also a talented swimmer. He later emigrated to New Zealand and became a farmer at Pokuru. While living there he was chairman of the Kakepuku Dairy Company and chairman of the local school committee. Appointed a justice of the peace in 1922, he was later president of the Bay of Plenty Justices' Association. In 1923, he moved to Tauranga.

== Military career ==
In early 1915 Wilkinson enlisted in the army and served with the New Zealand Rifle Brigade in Egypt and later in France, returning with the rank of lieutenant. After the war he became actively engaged in territorial training for 19 years until he was posted to the reserve of officers.

He was elected president of the Returned and Services' Association (RSA) in 1928, retiring in 1934, he was presented with life-membership of the RSA. On the outbreak of World War II, Wilkinson was appointed Recruiting Officer for the Tauranga area, and controller of civil defence. He was elected chairman of the Bay of Plenty Patriotic Committee, district representative on the Auckland Provincial Patriotic Council, chairman of the War Loans Committee and chairman of the Tauranga Rehabilitation Committee.

== Political career ==
Wilkinson served on the Tauranga District High School Committee and Tauranga College Committee of Management. In 1935 he was elected mayor and was re-elected in the next four elections.

At the 1943 general election he stood for the seat of Tauranga, but was unsuccessful.

He was defeated for the mayoralty by former MP Bill Barnard in 1950, but was re-elected in a 1952 by-election following Barnard's resignation.

Wilkinson was a member of the Tauranga Harbour Board, Tauranga Hospital Board (including a period as deputy chairman) and chairman of the Tauranga Fire Board. He was president of the New Zealand Municipal Electric Supply Authorities' Association and member of the New Zealand Municipal Association executive.

In 1953, Wilkinson was awarded the Queen Elizabeth II Coronation Medal.

Political offices
Preceded by Alfred Francis Daly Tunks	Mayor of Tauranga; 1935-1950; 1952-1956	Succeeded by Bill Barnard
Preceded by Bill Barnard	Mayor of Tauranga; 1935-1950; 1952-1956	Succeeded by David Mitchell
