= 1952 Tauranga mayoral by-election =

← 1950	18 October 1952	1953 →
- Turnout: 2,486

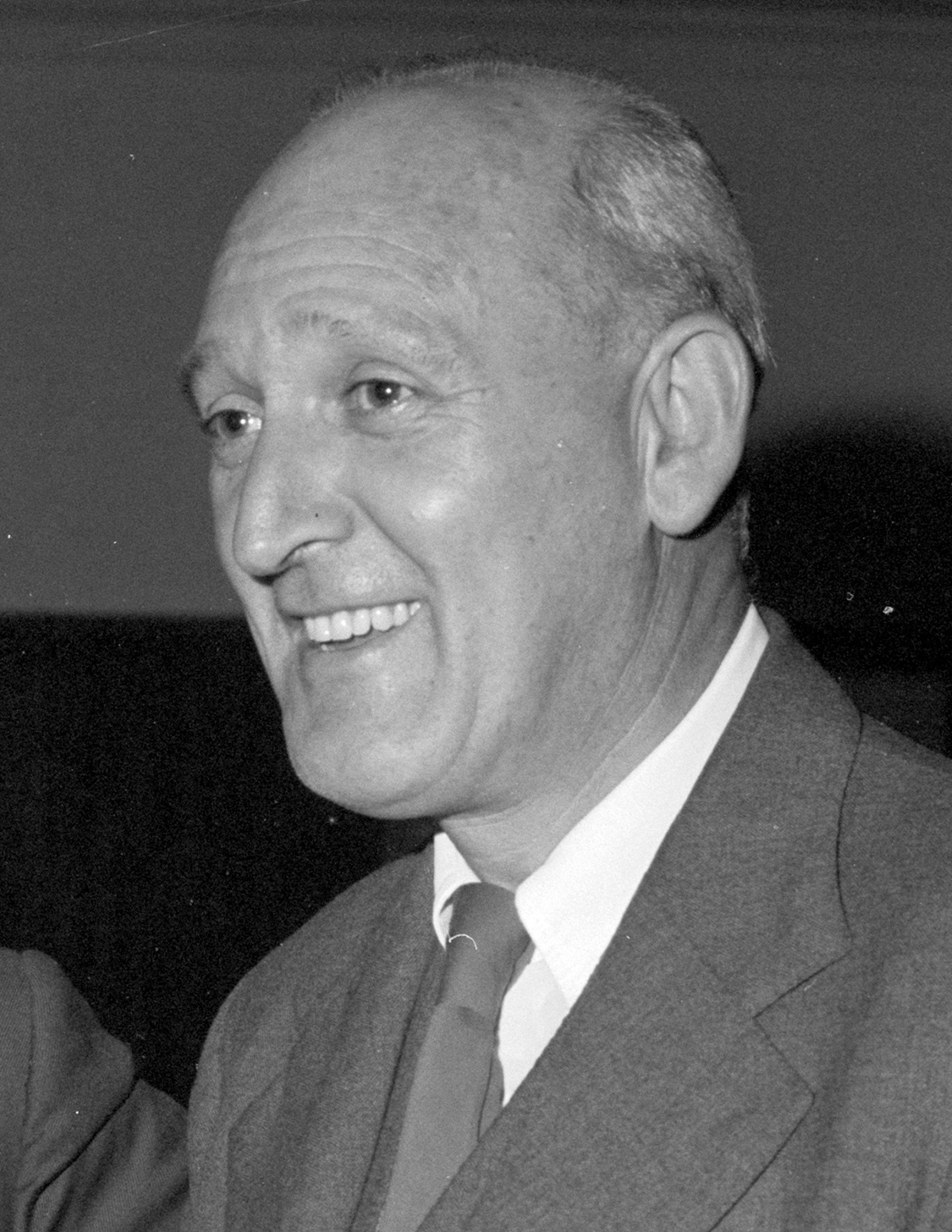
Candidate	Lionel Wilkinson	Frederick Christian	Lionel Lees
Party	Independent	Independent	Independent
Popular vote	985	838	663
Percentage	39.63	33.71	26.66
Mayor before election
Bill Barnard
Elected mayor
Lionel Wilkinson

The 1952 Tauranga mayoral by-election was held to elect a successor to Bill Barnard who resigned as Mayor of Tauranga owing to ill-health. The polling was conducted using the standard first-past-the-post electoral method.

== Background ==
Mayor Bill Barnard announced at a meeting of the Tauranga Borough Council on 16 July 1952 of his intention of resigning from his position on 1 August that year. He stated that the workload of his mayoral duties combined with those of his legal practice had begun to negatively affect his health. Three candidates put themselves forward for the now vacated position. Councillors Frederick Newham Christian and Lionel Deacon Lees, as well as former mayor Lionel Wilkinson (who was defeated by Barnard in 1950) stood in the by-election.

== Results ==
The following table gives the election results:

1952 Tauranga mayoral by-election
Party	Candidate	Votes	%	±%
Independent	Lionel Wilkinson	985	39.63	
Independent	Frederick Christian	838	33.71	
Independent	Lionel Lees	663	26.66	
Majority		147	5.91	
Turnout		2,486		
