= Napier (New Zealand electorate) =

- Single-member general constituency for the New Zealand House of Representatives
- Interactive map of boundaries from the 2026 election
- Formation: 1861
- Region: Gisborne District and Hawke's Bay
- Character: Urban and rural
- Term: 3 years

Member for Napier
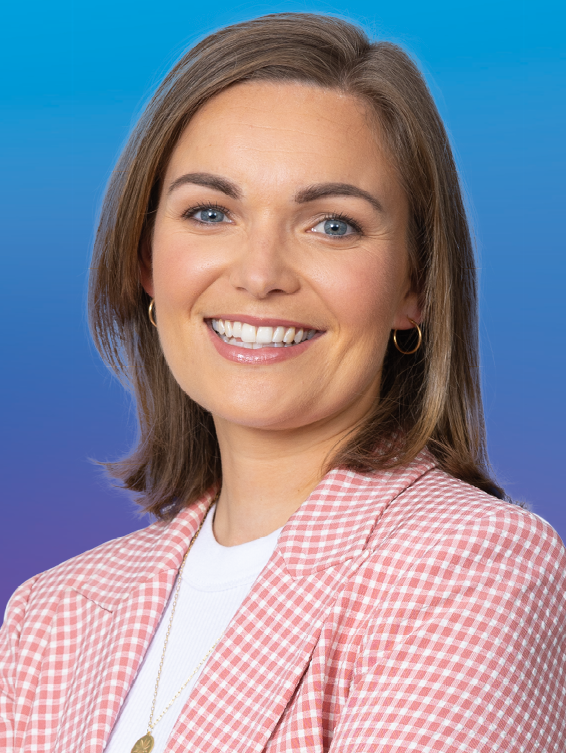
- Katie Nimon since 14 October 2023
- Party: National
- Previous MP: Stuart Nash (Labour)
Party vote distribution

Napier is a New Zealand parliamentary electorate, returning one Member of Parliament to the House of Representatives. It is named after the city of Napier, the main urban area within the electorate. The electorate was established for the 1861 election and has existed since. Neighbouring electorates are Tukituki to the south, East Coast to the north, and Taupō and Rangitīkei over the ranges to the west.

It has been held by Katie Nimon of the New Zealand National Party since the 2023 general election. It was held by Stuart Nash of the New Zealand Labour Party from the 2014 general election until 2023, when he did not stand for re-election.

== Population centres ==
Map of boundaries at the 2020 and 2023 general elections

The electorate stretches from the Ngaruroro River in the south, up through all of the Wairoa District, to Muriwai, almost to the outskirts of Gisborne, and inland to Mātāwai at its northernmost point.

It includes the following population centres:

- Napier
- Pakowhai
- Waiohiki
- Omahu
- Sherenden
- Wairoa
- Frasertown
- Nūhaka
- Tuai

== History ==
The electorate was created in 1861, and preceded by the Wairarapa and Hawke's Bay electorate from 1853 to 1860 and then briefly the County of Hawke electorate in 1860. It was a two-member electorate from 1876 to 1881.

The first representative was Henry Powning Stark, who won the election on 19 February 1861.

There were speculations that Douglas Maclean would be the conservative candidate in the Napier electorate in the 1890 election upon his return from England instead of George Swan, but this was not correct. Swan contested the election and was successful against the Liberal Party candidate Michael Gannon. In the 1893 election, Swan was challenged by the Liberal Party candidate Samuel Carnell, with the latter being successful against the incumbent. In the 1896 election, Carnell in turn was challenged by the conservative candidate Douglas Maclean, with Maclean achieving a large majority against the incumbent.

In the 1931 election, the incumbent, Bill Barnard of the Labour Party, was challenged by John Butler of the Reform Party as the official candidate of the United–Reform Coalition, and United Party member Vigor Brown as an independent. Brown, at the time Mayor of Napier and previously MP for Napier for many years, withdrew just before the election, but too late for his name to be excluded from the ballot papers. The election was won by Barnard.

Labour's Russell Fairbrother was first elected in the electorate in the 2002 election, replacing long-standing MP Geoff Braybrooke. In the 2005 election, Chris Tremain defeated Fairbrother, winning the electorate for the National Party for the first time since the 1951 election. In the 2008 election, Tremain retained the electorate with an increased majority over Fairbrother. In the 2011 election, Tremain beat Labour's Stuart Nash.

Tremain announced in September 2013 that he would not contest the 2014 election. Wayne Walford succeeded Tremain as National's candidate for the seat, Nash contested the electorate for the Labour Party for the second time, and Garth McVicar stood for the Conservative Party. McVicar had a high-profile due to his previous involvement with the Sensible Sentencing Trust lobby group. In July 2014, Walford was referred to Police by the Electoral Commission for breaching the Electoral Act by failing to display an authorisation statement on his campaign vehicle.

Nash had a majority of 3,850 votes over Walford. McVicar's 7,603 votes split the traditional National Party votes (24.8% of electors who gave their party vote to National gave their electorate vote to McVicar, a total of 4,465 votes), which helped Nash win the election.

In the 2025 boundary review, the electorate would gain the communities north of the Ngaruroro River from Tukituki for the 2026 general election onwards.

=== Members of Parliament ===
Unless otherwise stated, all MPs terms began and ended at a general election.

Key

Independent Conservative Liberal Labour Reform Democratic Labour National ACT

==== single-member electorate ====
Election	Winner
1861 election	Henry Powning Stark
1861 by-election	William Colenso
1866 election	Donald McLean
1871 election	Donald McLean

==== multi-member electorate ====
Election	Winners	
1875 election	Donald McLean	William Russell
1877 by-election	Fred Sutton	William Russell
1879 election	Fred Sutton	William Russell

==== single-member electorate ====
Election	Winner
1881 election	John Buchanan
1884 election	John Davies Ormond
1887 election	John Davies Ormond
1890 election	George Swan
1893 election	Samuel Carnell
1896 election	Douglas Maclean
1899 election	Alfred Fraser
1902 election	Alfred Fraser
1905 election	Alfred Fraser
1908 election	Vigor Brown
1911 election	Vigor Brown
1914 election	Vigor Brown
1919 election	Vigor Brown
1922 election	Lew McIlvride
1925 election	John Mason
1928 election	Bill Barnard
1931 election	Bill Barnard
1935 election	Bill Barnard
1938 election	Bill Barnard
1943 election	Tommy Armstrong
1946 election	Tommy Armstrong
1949 election	Tommy Armstrong
1951 election	Peter Tait
1954 election	Jim Edwards
1957 election	Jim Edwards
1960 election	Jim Edwards
1963 election	Jim Edwards
1966 election	Gordon Christie
1969 election	Gordon Christie
1972 election	Gordon Christie
1975 election	Gordon Christie
1978 election	Gordon Christie
1981 election	Geoff Braybrooke
1984 election	Geoff Braybrooke
1987 election	Geoff Braybrooke
1990 election	Geoff Braybrooke
1993 election	Geoff Braybrooke
1996 election	Geoff Braybrooke
1999 election	Geoff Braybrooke
2002 election	Russell Fairbrother
2005 election	Chris Tremain
2008 election	Chris Tremain
2011 election	Chris Tremain
2014 election	Stuart Nash
2017 election	Stuart Nash
2020 election	Stuart Nash
2023 election	Katie Nimon

=== List MPs ===
Members of Parliament elected from party lists in elections where that person also unsuccessfully contested the Napier electorate. Unless otherwise stated, all MPs terms began and ended at general elections.

Election	Winner
1999 election	Anne Tolley
2002 election	Donna Awatere Huata (Note: Awatere Huata was expelled from serving as a list MP on 19 November 2004.)
2005 election	Russell Fairbrother

== Election results ==
=== 2026 election ===
The next election will be held on 7 November 2026. Candidates for Napier are listed at Candidates in the 2026 New Zealand general election by electorate § Napier. Official results will be available after 27 November 2026.

=== 2023 election ===
2023 general election results: Napier
Notes:	Blue background denotes the winner of the electorate vote. Pink background denotes a candidate elected from their party list. Yellow background denotes an electorate win by a list member, or other incumbent. A ✓ or ✗ denotes status of any incumbent, win or lose respectively.						
Party	Candidate	Votes	%	±%	Party votes	%	±%
National	Katie Nimon	21,344	52.83	+15.79	16,670	40.76	+12.86
Labour	Mark Hutchinson	12,474	30.88	−20.17	10,810	26.43	−24.16
Green	Julienne Dickey	2,190	5.42	+0.76	3,476	8.50	+2.68
NZ First	Laurie Turnbull	1,729	4.28	—	2,794	6.83	+4.69
ACT	Pawel Milewski	1,211	3.00	+0.70	4,503	11.01	+2.89
DemocracyNZ	Martin Langford	765	1.90	—	205	0.50	—
Independent	John Clive Smith	258	0.64	+0.17			
Opportunities					621	1.52	+0.25
NZ Loyal					514	1.26	—
Te Pāti Māori					380	0.93	+0.65
NewZeal					215	0.53	+0.36
Legalise Cannabis					199	0.49	+0.07
Freedoms NZ					79	0.19	—
Animal Justice					69	0.17	—
New Conservatives					44	0.11	−1.34
Women's Rights					36	0.09	—
Leighton Baker Party					26	0.06	—
New Nation					18	0.04	—
Informal votes		429			240		
Total valid votes		40,400			40,899		
National gain from Labour	Majority	8,870	21.95	+15.79			

=== 2020 election ===
2020 general election: Napier
Notes:	Blue background denotes the winner of the electorate vote. Pink background denotes a candidate elected from their party list. Yellow background denotes an electorate win by a list member, or other incumbent. A ✓ or ✗ denotes status of any incumbent, win or lose respectively.						
Party	Candidate	Votes	%	±%	Party votes	%	±%
Labour	✓ Stuart Nash	21,325	51.06	−3.17	21,245	50.59	+12.76
National	Katie Nimon	15,469	37.04	−3.49	11,718	27.90	−18.30
Green	James Crow	1,948	4.66	+1.03	2,444	5.82	+0.82
New Conservative	Deborah Burnside	1,032	2.47	+1.87	611	1.45	+1.08
ACT	Judy Kendall	962	2.30	—	3,410	8.12	+7.73
Independent	John Clive Smith	197	0.47	—			
Independent	Camden Gaskin	92	0.22	—			
NZ First					899	2.14	−5.06
Opportunities					537	1.27	−0.63
Advance NZ					355	0.84	—
Legalise Cannabis					179	0.42	+0.12
Māori Party					118	0.28	−0.12
ONE					72	0.17	—
Outdoors					39	0.09	+0.02
Vision NZ					24	0.05	—
Sustainable NZ					21	0.05	—
Social Credit					13	0.03	−0.03
TEA					11	0.03	—
Heartland					8	0.01	—
Informal votes		722			287		
Total valid votes		41,757			41,991		
Labour hold	Majority	5,856	14.02	+0.33			

=== 2017 election ===
2017 general election: Napier
Notes:	Blue background denotes the winner of the electorate vote. Pink background denotes a candidate elected from their party list. Yellow background denotes an electorate win by a list member, or other incumbent. A ✓ or ✗ denotes status of any incumbent, win or lose respectively.						
Party	Candidate	Votes	%	±%	Party votes	%	±%
Labour	✓ Stuart Nash	20,677	54.23	+11.82	14,681	37.83	+11.97
National	David Elliott	15,457	40.53	+8.77	17,929	46.20	−2.99
Green	Damon Rusden	1,386	3.63	−0.14	1,938	5.00	−3.75
Māori Party	Maryanne Marsters	308	0.81	—	154	0.40	−0.04
Conservative	Laurence Day	230	0.60	−20.42	145	0.37	−5.83
Democrats	Karl Matthys	72	0.19	+0.05	25	0.06	−0.01
NZ First					2,794	7.20	−0.20
Opportunities					739	1.90	—
ACT					152	0.39	+0.11
Legalise Cannabis					116	0.30	−0.12
Ban 1080					38	0.10	−0.06
People's Party					32	0.08	—
Outdoors					28	0.07	—
United Future					19	0.05	−0.12
Mana					11	0.03	−0.57 (Note: 2017 Mana Party swing is relative to the votes for Internet-Mana in 2014; it shared a party list with the Internet Party in the 2014 election)
Internet					3	0.01	−0.59 (Note: 2017 Internet Party swing is relative to the votes for Internet-Mana in 2014; it shared a party list with Mana Party in the 2014 election)
Informal votes		324			119		
Total valid votes		38,130			38,804		
Turnout		38,923					
Labour hold	Majority	5,220	13.69	+3.05			

=== 2014 election ===
2014 general election: Napier
Notes:	Blue background denotes the winner of the electorate vote. Pink background denotes a candidate elected from their party list. Yellow background denotes an electorate win by a list member, or other incumbent. A ✓ or ✗ denotes status of any incumbent, win or lose respectively.						
Party	Candidate	Votes	%	±%	Party votes	%	±%
Labour	Stuart Nash	15,343	42.41	+1.42	9,466	25.86	−3.40
National	Wayne Walford	11,493	31.77	−20.34	18,005	49.19	+0.42
Conservative	Garth McVicar	7,603	21.02	+19.01	2,270	6.20	+2.85
Green	Paul Bailey	1,363	3.77	−0.24	3,198	8.74	−1.07
Alliance	Mary O'Neil	59	0.16	+0.02			
Democrats	Bary Pulford	51	0.14	+0.14	27	0.07	+0.02
NZ First					2,709	7.40	+1.82
Internet Mana					219	0.60	+0.36 (Note: 2014 Internet Mana swing is relative to the votes for Mana in 2011; it shared a party list with Internet in the 2014 election.)
Māori Party					160	0.44	−0.17
Legalise Cannabis					153	0.42	−0.10
ACT					103	0.28	−0.78
United Future					63	0.17	−0.43
Ban 1080					58	0.16	+0.16
Civilian					16	0.04	+0.04
Independent Coalition					7	0.02	+0.02
Focus					6	0.02	+0.02
Informal votes		236			145		
Total valid votes		36,175			36,605		
Turnout		36,605	80.36	+3.76			
Labour gain from National	Majority	3,850	10.64	+21.76			

=== 2011 election ===
2011 general election: Napier
Notes:	Blue background denotes the winner of the electorate vote. Pink background denotes a candidate elected from their party list. Yellow background denotes an electorate win by a list member, or other incumbent. A ✓ or ✗ denotes status of any incumbent, win or lose respectively.						
Party	Candidate	Votes	%	±%	Party votes	%	±%
National	✓ Chris Tremain	17,337	52.11	−7.58	16,538	48.77	+1.51
Labour	Stuart Nash	13,636	40.99	+7.05	9,921	29.26	−6.31
Green	Paul Edward Bailey	1,334	4.01	−1.13	3,327	9.81	+4.26
Conservative	Roy Brown	668	2.01	+2.01	1,137	3.35	+3.35
ACT	John Ormond	159	0.48	−0.74	359	1.06	−2.59
Mana	Rod Paul	86	0.26	+0.26	83	0.24	+0.24
Alliance	Mary O'Neill	48	0.14	+0.14	34	0.10	−0.03
NZ First					1,893	5.58	+1.88
Māori Party					207	0.61	−0.16
United Future					203	0.60	-0.002
Legalise Cannabis					175	0.52	+0.14
Democrats					16	0.05	+0.02
Libertarianz					14	0.04	+0.002
Informal votes		678			321		
Total valid votes		33,268			33,907		
National hold	Majority	3,701	11.12	−14.64			

Electorate (as at 26 November 2011): 44,266

=== 2008 election ===
2008 general election: Napier
Notes:	Blue background denotes the winner of the electorate vote. Pink background denotes a candidate elected from their party list. Yellow background denotes an electorate win by a list member, or other incumbent. A ✓ or ✗ denotes status of any incumbent, win or lose respectively.						
Party	Candidate	Votes	%	±%	Party votes	%	±%
National	✓ Chris Tremain	20,898	59.70	+8.73	16,772	47.26	+4.94
Labour	Russell Fairbrother	11,880	33.94	−6.83	12,621	35.57	−5.43
Green	Brett Stansfield	1,801	5.14	+1.20	1,969	5.55	+0.32
ACT	John Ormond	428	1.22		1,296	3.65	+2.56
NZ First					1,314	3.70	−1.88
Māori Party					272	0.77	+0.35
Progressive					269	0.76	−0.13
United Future					213	0.60	−1.85
Kiwi					212	0.60	
Bill and Ben					207	0.58	
Legalise Cannabis					132	0.37	+0.15
Family Party					67	0.19	
Alliance					47	0.13	+0.05
Pacific					43	0.12	
Workers Party					18	0.05	
Libertarianz					14	0.04	+0.01
Democrats					8	0.02	−0.02
RAM					7	0.02	
RONZ					5	0.01	±0.00
Informal votes		358			169		
Total valid votes		35,007			35,486		
National hold	Majority	9,018	25.76	+15.57			

=== 2005 election ===
2005 general election: Napier
Notes:	Blue background denotes the winner of the electorate vote. Pink background denotes a candidate elected from their party list. Yellow background denotes an electorate win by a list member, or other incumbent. A ✓ or ✗ denotes status of any incumbent, win or lose respectively.						
Party	Candidate	Votes	%	±%	Party votes	%	±%
National	Chris Tremain	17,955	50.53		15,086	42.17	
Labour	✗ Russell Fairbrother	14,364	40.42		14,615	40.85	
Green	Terry Creighton	1,391	3.91		1,864	5.21	
NZ First	James Mist	855	2.40		1,989	5.56	
United Future	Graham Turner	473	1.30		872	2.44	
ACT					390	1.09	
Progressive					316	0.88	
Destiny					193	0.54	
Māori Party					150	0.42	
Legalise Cannabis					80	0.22	
Christian Heritage					44	0.12	
Alliance					29	0.08	
Democrats					16	0.04	
Libertarianz					11	0.03	
Direct Democracy					11	0.03	
One NZ					11	0.03	
99 MP					8	0.02	
Family Rights					6	0.02	
RONZ					5	0.01	
Informal votes		305			129		
Total valid votes		35,536			35,777		
National gain from Labour	Majority	3,591					

=== 2002 election ===
2002 general election: Napier
Notes:	Blue background denotes the winner of the electorate vote. Pink background denotes a candidate elected from their party list. Yellow background denotes an electorate win by a list member, or other incumbent. A ✓ or ✗ denotes status of any incumbent, win or lose respectively.						
Party	Candidate	Votes	%	±%	Party votes	%	±%
Labour	Russell Fairbrother	14,659	46.24		14,853	45.63	+1.36
National	Anne Tolley	10,502	33.13	+9.20	6,074	18.66	−7.86
Green	Terry Creighton	1,872	5.62		2,023	6.21	+1.48
United Future	Graham Turner	1,569	4.95		1,977	6.07	
ACT	Donna Awatere Huata	1,381	4.36		2,061	6.33	+0.49
Alliance	Maxine Boag	686	2.16		411	1.26	−9.46
Christian Heritage	Colin Barr	616	1.94		515	1.58	−0.79
One NZ	John Bull	506	1.60		119	0.37	+0.32
NZ First					3,045	9.36	+6.82
ORNZ					805	2.47	
Progressive					492	1.51	
Legalise Cannabis					164	0.50	−0.55
Mana Māori					6	0.02	+0.01
NMP					6	0.02	0.00
Informal votes		801			112		
Total valid votes		31,701			32,551		
Labour hold	Majority	4,157	13.11	−22.91			

=== 1999 election ===
1999 general election: Napier
Notes:	Blue background denotes the winner of the electorate vote. Pink background denotes a candidate elected from their party list. Yellow background denotes an electorate win by a list member, or other incumbent. A ✓ or ✗ denotes status of any incumbent, win or lose respectively.						
Party	Candidate	Votes	%	±%	Party votes	%	±%
Labour	✓ Geoff Braybrooke	19,743	59.95	+4.87	14,684	44.27	+9.59
National	Anne Tolley	7,880	23.93		8,797	26.52	−2.89
Alliance	Robin Gwynn	2,242	6.81	−2.08	3,555	10.72	−1.38
Green	Angie Denby	1,169	3.55		1,569	4.73	
ACT	Mel Chandler	623	1.89		1,936	5.84	+0.49
Christian Heritage	Bob Davis	513	1.56		785	2.37	
NZ First	Lyola Randell-Cotter	305	0.93		844	2.54	−8.81
Christian Democrats	Allana Hiha	264	0.80		294	0.89	
Independent	Laurance McGregor	195	0.59				
Legalise Cannabis					349	1.05	−1.02
United NZ					110	0.33	−0.22
Libertarianz					102	0.31	+0.30
Animals First					67	0.20	0.00
McGillicuddy Serious					25	0.08	−0.10
One NZ					16	0.05	
Natural Law					13	0.04	−0.10
The People's Choice					8	0.02	
NMP					5	0.02	
Republican					5	0.02	
Mana Māori					3	0.01	−0.01
Mauri Pacific					2	0.01	
South Island					2	0.01	
Freedom Movement					0	0.00	
Informal votes		533			296		
Total valid votes		32,934			33,171		
Labour hold	Majority	11,863	36.02	+4.53			

=== 1996 election ===
1996 general election: Napier
Notes:	Blue background denotes the winner of the electorate vote. Pink background denotes a candidate elected from their party list. Yellow background denotes an electorate win by a list member, or other incumbent. A ✓ or ✗ denotes status of any incumbent, win or lose respectively.						
Party	Candidate	Votes	%	±%	Party votes	%	±%
Labour	✓ Geoff Braybrooke	17,756	55.11		11,266	34.68	
National	Kathryn Ward	7,610	23.62		9,554	29.41	
Alliance	Robin Gwynn	2,865	8.89		3,931	12.10	
NZ First	Stuart Spencer	2,567	7.97		3,687	11.35	
ACT	Jean Hill	1,285	3.99		1,738	5.35	
Natural Law	Ian Levingston	134	0.42		46	0.14	
Christian Coalition					1,167	3.59	
Legalise Cannabis					674	2.07	
United NZ					180	0.55	
Animals First					65	0.20	
Progressive Green					63	0.19	
McGillicuddy Serious					57	0.18	
Green Society					19	0.06	
Superannuitants & Youth					18	0.06	
Ethnic Minority Party					6	0.02	
Advance New Zealand					5	0.02	
Mana Māori					5	0.02	
Asia Pacific United					4	0.01	
Conservatives					2	0.01	
Libertarianz					2	0.01	
Te Tawharau					0	0.00	
Informal votes		394			121		
Total valid votes		32,217			32,490		
Labour hold	Majority	10,146	31.49				

=== 1993 election ===
1993 general election: Napier
Party	Candidate	Votes	%	±%
Labour	Geoff Braybrooke	9,923	50.61	+4.13
National	Colleen Pritchard	4,997	25.48	−14.01
Alliance	Derek Holland	3,399	17.33	+12.34
NZ First	James Morunga	989	5.04	
Christian Heritage	Gary Bisley	297	1.51	
Majority		4,926	25.12	+18.14
Turnout		19,605	83.48	−0.43
Registered electors		23,482		

=== 1990 election ===
1990 general election: Napier
Party	Candidate	Votes	%	±%
Labour	Geoff Braybrooke	8,420	46.48	−16.45
National	Colleen Pritchard	7,155	39.49	
Green	B P Duggan	1,428	7.88	
NewLabour	Derek Holland	904	4.99	
Democrats	P A Williamson	141	0.77	
Independent	R F Terry	66	0.36	
Majority		1,265	6.98	−22.02
Turnout		18,114	83.91	−2.78
Registered electors		21,585		

=== 1987 election ===
1987 general election: Napier
Party	Candidate	Votes	%	±%
Labour	Geoff Braybrooke	11,770	62.93	+5.81
National	Ashley Church	6,345	33.92	
Democrats	Beryl Shakes	586	3.13	
Majority		5,425	29.00	−1.24
Turnout		18,701	86.69	−6.16
Registered electors		21,571		

=== 1984 election ===
1984 general election: Napier
Party	Candidate	Votes	%	±%
Labour	Geoff Braybrooke	12,085	57.12	+10.16
National	M P Liddell	5,686	26.87	
NZ Party	Noel Mockford	2,711	12.81	
Social Credit	R E Culpitt	673	3.18	
Majority		6,399	30.24	+15.63
Turnout		21,155	92.85	+2.39
Registered electors		22,784		

=== 1981 election ===
1981 general election: Napier
Party	Candidate	Votes	%	±%
Labour	Geoff Braybrooke	9,672	46.96	
National	Kevin Rose	6,663	32.35	−2.77
Social Credit	Martin Hine	4,260	20.68	
Majority		3,009	14.61	
Turnout		20,595	90.46	+7.59
Registered electors		22,766		

=== 1978 election ===
1978 general election: Napier
Party	Candidate	Votes	%	±%
Labour	Gordon Christie	9,987	49.68	+4.52
National	Kevin Rose	7,060	35.12	
Social Credit	L C Barker	2,664	13.25	
Values	Jim Saunders	388	1.93	
Majority		2,927	14.56	+10.09
Turnout		20,099	73.71	−11.99
Registered electors		27,267		

=== 1975 election ===
1975 general election: Napier
Party	Candidate	Votes	%	±%
Labour	Gordon Christie	9,395	45.16	−11.33
National	John Isles	8,464	40.69	
Social Credit	Heather Woodhall	1,841	8.85	
Values	Duncan White	1,084	5.21	
Independent	H Sykes	16	0.07	
Majority		931	4.47	−16.09
Turnout		20,800	85.70	−4.31
Registered electors		24,270		

=== 1972 election ===
1972 general election: Napier
Party	Candidate	Votes	%	±%
Labour	Gordon Christie	10,232	56.49	+3.55
National	Merle Bell	6,507	35.92	
Social Credit	Robert James Hurdle	912	5.03	
Values	James Barnes	365	2.01	
New Democratic	Alfred William Earl Barley	95	0.52	
Majority		3,725	20.56	+10.15
Turnout		18,111	90.01	−0.97
Registered electors		20,121		

=== 1969 election ===
1969 general election: Napier
Party	Candidate	Votes	%	±%
Labour	Gordon Christie	10,013	52.94	+7.08
National	Terry Dunleavy	8,043	42.52	
Social Credit	Roy Hollands	857	4.53	−5.96
Majority		1,970	10.41	+8.19
Turnout		18,913	90.98	+1.90
Registered electors		20,787		

=== 1966 election ===
1966 general election: Napier
Party	Candidate	Votes	%	±%
Labour	Gordon Christie	8,088	45.86	
National	Maurice Kidson	7,695	43.63	
Social Credit	Roy Hollands	1,850	10.49	
Majority		393	2.22	
Turnout		17,633	89.08	−2.94
Registered electors		19,793		

=== 1963 election ===
1963 general election: Napier
Party	Candidate	Votes	%	±%
Labour	Jim Edwards	8,438	50.43	−0.81
National	D'Arcy Ormonde Haskell	7,653	45.74	
Social Credit	Allan Edgar Frampton	638	3.81	−1.25
Majority		785	4.69	−3.45
Turnout		16,729	92.02	+0.49
Registered electors		18,178		

=== 1960 election ===
1960 general election: Napier
Party	Candidate	Votes	%	±%
Labour	Jim Edwards	8,838	51.24	−4.02
National	William John Gunn	7,533	43.68	
Social Credit	Allan Edgar Frampton	874	5.06	+1.01
Majority		1,405	8.14	−6.45
Turnout		17,245	92.51	−2.30
Registered electors		18,640		

=== 1957 election ===
1957 general election: Napier
Party	Candidate	Votes	%	±%
Labour	Jim Edwards	9,140	55.26	+4.51
National	Ray Foster	6,727	40.67	
Social Credit	Allan Edgar Frampton	671	4.05	
Majority		2,413	14.59	+10.02
Turnout		16,538	94.81	−0.16
Registered electors		17,443		

=== 1954 election ===
1954 general election: Napier
Party	Candidate	Votes	%	±%
Labour	Jim Edwards	7,992	50.75	
National	Peter Tait	7,272	46.18	−3.96
Social Credit	J Lothian	481	3.05	
Majority		720	4.57	
Turnout		15,745	94.97	+3.22
Registered electors		16,578		

=== 1951 election ===
1951 general election: Napier
Party	Candidate	Votes	%	±%
National	Peter Tait	7,375	50.14	
Labour	Tommy Armstrong	7,331	49.85	−1.81
Majority		44	0.29	
Turnout		14,706	91.75	−3.27
Registered electors		16,028		

=== 1949 election ===
1949 general election: Napier
Party	Candidate	Votes	%	±%
Labour	Tommy Armstrong	7,384	51.66	−5.05
National	William Tucker	6,663	46.62	
Communist	Charles James Brown	126	0.88	
Independent Liberal	John Cummins	118	0.82	
Majority		721	5.04	−8.39
Turnout		14,291	95.02	−0.68
Registered electors		15,039		

=== 1946 election ===
1946 general election: Napier
Party	Candidate	Votes	%	±%
Labour	Tommy Armstrong	7,789	56.71	+13.05
National	Alan John Price	5,944	43.28	
Majority		1,845	13.43	+3.43
Turnout		13,733	95.70	+0.41
Registered electors		14,350		

=== 1943 election ===
1943 general election: Napier
Party	Candidate	Votes	%	±%
Labour	Tommy Armstrong	5,558	43.66	
National	Morris Spence	4,285	33.66	
Independent	Bill Barnard	2,784	21.86	−41.49
Informal votes		103	0.80	−0.28
Majority		1,273	10.00	−21.77
Turnout		12,730	95.29	+0.13
Registered electors		13,358		

=== 1938 election ===
1938 general election: Napier
Party	Candidate	Votes	%	±%
Labour	Bill Barnard	8,097	65.35	−0.26
National	John Ormond	4,160	33.57	
Informal votes		134	1.08	+0.64
Majority		3,937	31.77	−4.91
Turnout		12,391	95.16	+2.46
Registered electors		13,021		

=== 1935 election ===
1935 general election: Napier
Party	Candidate	Votes	%	±%
Labour	Bill Barnard	7,290	65.91	+9.05
Reform	Frank Bannerman Logan	3,233	29.23	
Democrat	Norman Jacobsen	396	3.58	
Communist	William Wood	141	1.27	
Informal votes		49	0.44	+0.01
Majority		4,057	36.68	+22.62
Turnout		11,060	92.70	+8.85
Registered electors		11,930		

=== 1931 election ===
1931 general election: Napier
Party	Candidate	Votes	%	±%
Labour	Bill Barnard	5,886	56.86	+2.81
Reform	John Butler	4,430	42.79	
Independent	Vigor Brown	36	0.35	
Informal votes		45	0.43	−0.25
Majority		1,456	14.06	+5.97
Turnout		10,397	83.85	−6.37
Registered electors		12,399		

=== 1928 election ===
1928 general election: Napier
Party	Candidate	Votes	%	±%
Labour	Bill Barnard	4,095	54.05	
Reform	John Mason	3,482	45.95	−6.98
Informal votes		52	0.68	−0.29
Majority		613	8.09	+2.22
Turnout		7,629	90.22	−1.66
Registered electors		8,456		

=== 1925 election ===
1925 general election: Napier
Party	Candidate	Votes	%	±%
Reform	John Mason	5,169	52.93	+23.21
Labour	Lew McIlvride	4,596	47.07	+8.95
Informal votes		96	0.97	±0.00
Majority		573	5.87	−2.53
Turnout		9,861	91.88	+1.26
Registered electors		10,732		

=== 1922 election ===
1922 general election: Napier
Party	Candidate	Votes	%	±%
Labour	Lew McIlvride	3,465	38.12	
Reform	John Mason	2,702	29.72	
Independent Liberal	Albert Jull	1,996	21.96	
Reform	Vigor Brown	927	10.20	−24.19
Informal votes		89	0.97	−1.00
Majority		763	8.39	+7.72
Turnout		9,179	90.62	+9.35
Registered electors		10,129		

=== 1919 election ===
1919 general election: Napier
Party	Candidate	Votes	%	±%
Liberal	Vigor Brown	2,763	34.39	−30.82
Labour	Frederick Charles Evans	2,709	33.72	
Ind. Progressive	Henry Hill	2,562	31.89	
Informal votes		161	1.96	+0.86
Majority		54	0.67	−29.75
Turnout		8,195	81.27	−2.52
Registered electors		10,084		

=== 1914 election ===
1914 general election: Napier
Party	Candidate	Votes	%	±%
Liberal	Vigor Brown	4,748	65.21	+7.36
Reform	George William Venables	2,533	34.79	
Informal votes		81	1.10	−0.91
Majority		2,215	30.42	+14.72
Turnout		7,362	83.78	+1.62
Registered electors		8,787		

=== 1911 election ===
1911 general election: Napier, first ballot
Party	Candidate	Votes	%	±%
Liberal	Vigor Brown	3,920	57.85	−0.02
Labour	Henry Hill	2,856	42.15	
Informal votes		139	2.01	
Majority		1,064	15.70	−0.05
Turnout		6,915	82.16	+4.52
Registered electors		8,416		

=== 1908 election ===
1908 general election: Napier, first ballot
Party	Candidate	Votes	%	±%
Liberal	Vigor Brown	3,803	57.88	
Liberal	Alfred Fraser	2,768	42.12	−12.49
Majority		1,035	15.75	−10.33
Turnout		6,571	77.64	−5.39
Registered electors		8,463		

=== 1905 election ===
1905 general election: Napier
Party	Candidate	Votes	%	±%
Liberal	Alfred Fraser	3,076	54.62	−14.06
Independent Liberal	Montague W. P. Lascelles	1,607	28.53	
Liberal–Labour	William James McGrath	949	16.85	
Informal votes		89	1.56	+0.24
Majority		1,469	26.08	−11.28
Turnout		5,721	83.03	+8.99
Registered electors				

=== 1902 election ===
1902 general election: Napier
Party	Candidate	Votes	%	±%
Liberal	Alfred Fraser	2,739	68.68	+18.20
Independent Liberal	Richard Joseph Eames	1,249	31.32	
Informal votes		72	1.31	
Majority		1,490	37.36	+36.40
Turnout		4,060	74.05	−6.06
Registered electors		5,483		

=== 1899 election ===
1899 general election: Napier
Party	Candidate	Votes	%	±%
Liberal	Alfred Fraser	1,994	50.48	
Conservative	Douglas Maclean	1,956	49.52	−12.66
Majority		38	0.96	−16.97
Turnout		3,950	80.11	−1.05
Registered electors		4,931		

=== 1893 election ===
1893 general election: Napier
Party	Candidate	Votes	%	±%
Liberal	Samuel Carnell	2,114	57.01	
Independent	George Swan	1,594	42.99	−10.21
Majority		520	14.02	
Turnout		3,708	87.87	+12.32
Registered electors		4,220		

=== 1890 election ===
1890 general election: Napier
Party	Candidate	Votes	%	±%
Independent	George Swan	1,105	53.20	
Liberal–Labour	Michael Gannon	972	46.80	
Majority		133	6.40	
Turnout		2,077	75.55	
Registered electors		2,749		

=== 1877 by-election ===
1877 Napier by-election
Party	Candidate	Votes	%	±%
Independent	Fred Sutton	317	42.10	
Independent	John Buchanan	294	39.04	
Independent	Henry Stokes Tiffen	128	17.00	
Independent	William Colenso	13	1.73	
Independent	William Barnard Rhodes	1	0.13	
Majority		23	3.05	
Turnout		753		

=== 1861 by-election ===
1861 Napier by-election
Party	Candidate	Votes	%	±%
Independent	William Colenso	47	44.8	
Independent	Henry Sealy	30	28.6	
Independent	John Tucker	23	21.9	
Independent	J. B. Ferguson	5	4.8	
Majority		17	16.2	
Turnout		105		
