= 1951 New Zealand general election =

- 1 September 1951

All 80 seats in the New Zealand Parliament 41 seats were needed for a majority
- Turnout: 1,069,791 (89.1%) ▼
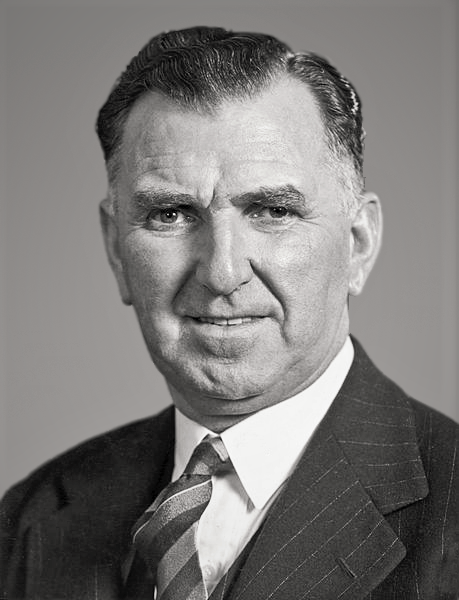

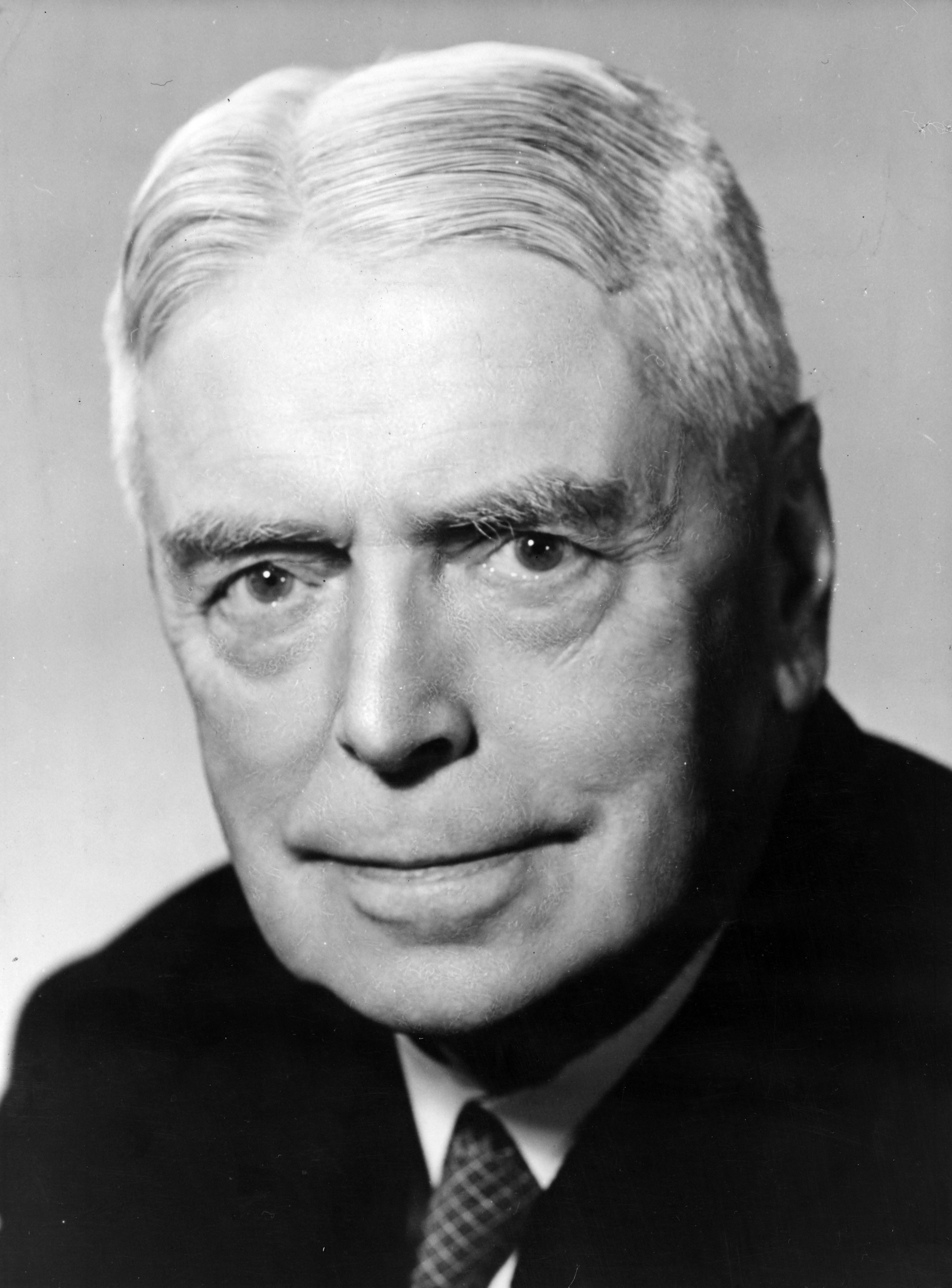
	First party	Second party
Leader	Sidney Holland	Walter Nash
Party	National	Labour
Leader since	26 November 1940	17 January 1951
Leader's seat	Fendalton	Hutt
Last election	46 seats, 51.9%	34 seats, 47.2%
Seats won	50	30
Seat change	▲4	▼4
Popular vote	577,630	490,143
Percentage	54.0%	45.8%
Swing	▲2.1%	▼1.4%
- Results of the election.
Prime Minister before election
Sidney Holland
National
Subsequent Prime Minister
Sidney Holland
National

The 1951 New Zealand general election was a nationwide vote to determine the shape of the New Zealand Parliament's 30th term. The First National Government was re-elected, with the National Party increasing its parliamentary majority over the opposition Labour Party. This was the last time until the 2020 election that a party was elected to majority government of New Zealand by receiving a majority of the vote.

== Background ==
The National Party had formed its first administration after the 1949 elections, in which it had ended four terms of government by the Labour Party. The National government, with Sidney Holland as Prime Minister, had undertaken a number of economic and constitutional reforms, although it had not seriously modified the new social welfare system which Labour had introduced. Labour's leader, Peter Fraser, had died in December 1950 after a long period of poor health, and had been replaced in January 1951 by Walter Nash. Nash had been Minister of Finance for the duration of the first Labour government.

The most significant issue in the 1951 elections was the growing industrial unrest of the time, particularly the ongoing dockworkers dispute. Holland condemned the strikers, calling the situation "industrial anarchy". The Labour Party, under Nash, attempted to take a moderate position in the dispute, but ended up displeasing both sides. Holland, seeking a mandate to respond strongly to the strike, called a snap election. Another issue was high inflation, which frustrated voters and without the distraction of the strike, might have threatened Holland's government at the scheduled election for 1952.

=== MPs retiring in 1951 ===
Two MPs retired at the election, one each from Labour and National.

Party	Name	Electorate
Labour	Bill Parry	Arch Hill
National	Frederick Doidge	Tauranga

== The election ==
The date for the main 1951 elections was 1 September, and for the first time, elections to the four Maori seats were held on the same day. The 1951 elections were also the first under the new regulations which required elections to be held on a Saturday. 1,205,762 people were registered to vote, and turnout was 89.1%. The number of seats being contested was 80, a number which had been fixed since 1902.

== Results ==
=== Party standings ===
The 1951 election saw the governing National Party re-elected with a twenty-seat margin, a substantial improvement on the twelve-seat margin it previously held. National won fifty seats compared with the Labour Party's thirty. The popular vote was closer, however, with National winning 54% to Labour's 46%. No seats were won by minor party candidates or by independents. No party then captured a majority of the vote until the 2020 election, when Labour won 50.01%.

Election results
Party	Candidates	Total votes	Percentage	Seats won	change
National	80	577,630	54.00	50	+4
Labour	80	490,143	45.80	30	−4
Communist	4	528	0.05	0	±0
Others	7	1,490	0.14	0	±0
Total	171	1,069,791		80	

=== Votes summary ===
Popular Vote
National	54.00%
Labour	45.80%
Others	0.20%

Parliament seats
National	62.50%
Labour	37.50%

Key
Labour National

Electorate results for the 1951 New Zealand general election
Electorate	Incumbent	Winner	Majority	Runner up
General electorates
Arch Hill	Bill Parry	John Stewart	3,965	Paddy Hope
Ashburton	Geoff Gerard		2,867	William Erle Rose
Auckland Central	Bill Anderton		2,168	Peter Hillyer
Avon	John Mathison		4,212	Douglas Warren Russell
Awarua	George Herron		3,755	Neville Pickering
Bay of Plenty	Bill Sullivan		4,047	Godfrey Santon
Brooklyn	Arnold Nordmeyer		1,826	Charles William Clift
Buller	Jerry Skinner		1,227	Phil McDonald
Central Otago	William Bodkin		3,620	T A Rodgers
Christchurch Central	Robert Macfarlane		4,103	Alma Schumacher
Clutha	James Roy		3,583	J M Sanders
Dunedin Central	Phil Connolly		373	Walter MacDougall
Dunedin North	Robert Walls		307	Donald Cameron
Eden	Wilfred Fortune		2,802	John Ronald Burfitt
Egmont	Ernest Corbett		4,896	Brian Edgar Richmond
Fendalton	Sidney Holland		4,366	Philip John Alley
Franklin	Jack Massey		5,358	Arthur Faulkner
Gisborne	Reginald Keeling	Harry Dudfield	338	Reginald Keeling
Grey Lynn	Fred Hackett		3,813	Harold Barry
Hamilton	Hilda Ross		2,252	Ben Waters
Hastings	Sydney Jones		1,138	Henry Edward Beattie
Hauraki	Andy Sutherland		4,468	Brevat William Dynes
Hawke's Bay	Cyril Harker		4,153	A Lowe
Hobson	Sidney Smith		5,337	Norman King
Hurunui	William Gillespie		2,921	Ed Cassidy
Hutt	Walter Nash		2,248	Jack Andrews
Invercargill	Ralph Hanan		2,123	F G Spurdle
Island Bay	Robert McKeen		1,680	James Duncan
Karori	Charles Bowden		3,453	Jim Bateman
Lyttelton	Terry McCombs	Harry Lake	133	Terry McCombs (Note: Terry McCombs was first on election night, but lost when special votes were included)
Manawatu	Matthew Oram		3,465	B A Rodgers
Marlborough	Tom Shand		2,452	Ted Meachen
Marsden	Alfred Murdoch		4,001	Mervyn Allan Hosking
Miramar	Bob Semple		301	Cuthbert Taylor
Mornington	Wally Hudson		3,783	Richard Philling
Mount Albert	Warren Freer		604	Reg Judson
Mount Victoria	Jack Marshall		2,198	Frank Kitts
Napier	Tommy Armstrong	Peter Tait	44	Tommy Armstrong (Note: Tommy Armstrong was first on election night, but lost when special votes were included)
Nelson	Edgar Neale		2,831	Stan Whitehead
New Plymouth	Ernest Aderman		2,335	Clarence Robert Parker
North Shore	Dean Eyre		2,155	Richard Wrathall
Oamaru	Thomas Hayman		1,315	C J Ryan
Onehunga	Arthur Osborne		1,966	Leonard Bradley
Onslow	Harry Combs		1,106	John S Meadowcroft
Otahuhu	Leon Götz		2,128	James Deas
Otaki	Jimmy Maher		1,142	Phil Holloway
Pahiatua	Keith Holyoake		4,598	Owen Jones
Palmerston North	Blair Tennent		200	Joe Hodgens (Note: Joe Hodgens was first on election night, but lost when special votes were included)
Parnell	Duncan Rae		1,587	Hugh Watt
Patea	William Sheat		2,467	Frederick William Finer
Petone	Mick Moohan		2,135	Norm Croft
Piako	Stan Goosman		6,364	Gilbert Parsons Kenah
Ponsonby	Ritchie Macdonald		1,504	Peter Dempsey
Raglan	Hallyburton Johnstone		1,766	James Harrison Wilson
Rangitikei	Edward Gordon		3,677	F A Dalzell
Remuera	Ronald Algie		5,346	Bob Tizard
Riccarton	Angus McLagan		2,265	Eric Philip Wills
Rodney	Clifton Webb		4,893	Arthur Laurence Leaming
Roskill	John Rae		440	Pat Curran
St Albans	Jack Watts		1,415	John Bernard Mora
St Kilda	Fred Jones	Jim Barnes	336	Fred Jones
Selwyn	John McAlpine		1,836	Jim Barclay
Sydenham	Mabel Howard		4,403	Albert Hugh Stott
Tamaki	Eric Halstead		1,461	Tom Skinner
Tauranga	Frederick Doidge	George Walsh	5,400	Hillary Joseph Pickett
Timaru	Clyde Carr		564	William Leslie Richards
Waikato	Geoffrey Sim		6,369	William Henry Bayly
Waimarino	Paddy Kearins		67	Arthur MacPherson
Waimate	David Kidd		2,232	A G Braddick
Wairarapa	Bert Cooksley		2,032	George Anders Hansen
Waitakere	Rex Mason		641	Robert Tapper
Waitomo	Walter Broadfoot		5,286	J Dwyer
Wallace	Tom Macdonald		5,060	J W Cleary
Wanganui	Joe Cotterill		226	Ernest Victor O'Keefe
Wellington Central	Charles Chapman		277	Berta Burns
Westland	Jim Kent		2,325	Isabella Catherine Brown
Māori electorates
Eastern Maori	Tiaki Omana		3,706	Turi Carroll
Northern Maori	Tapihana Paikea		2,132	James Henare
Southern Maori	Eruera Tirikatene		659	William Beaton
Western Maori	Iriaka Rātana		7,352	Hoeroa Marumaru

Table footnotes:
