= George Swan (politician) =

Member of Parliament

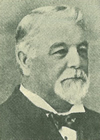
- Swan, c. 1900

Member of the New Zealand Parliament for Napier
- In office 1890–1893
- Preceded by: John Davies Ormond
- Succeeded by: Samuel Carnell

4th Mayor of Napier
- In office 1885–1901
- Preceded by: William Isaac Spencer
- Succeeded by: John McVay

Personal details
- Born: George Henry Swan; 1833 Sunderland, England
- Died: 25 July 1913 (aged 79) Whanganui, New Zealand
- Spouse: Frances née Stopher

George Henry Swan (1833 – 25 July 1913) was a 19th-century businessman and Member of Parliament in Hawke's Bay, New Zealand.

== Biography ==
New Zealand Parliament
Years	Term	Electorate	Party
1890–1893	11th	Napier	Conservative

Born in Sunderland, England, Swan went to Australia in 1854 and settled in New Zealand in 1857. Swan served as the Mayor of Napier from 1885 to 1901; at that time, he held the record for holding the longest continuous mayoralty in New Zealand.

He represented the Napier electorate from 1890 to 1893, concurrently as Mayor, when he was defeated. Though sometimes described as "Independent", he was really a "conservative"; although those opposed to the Liberals had not yet formed the Reform Party. He was opposed to party government, and wanted Maori and local shipping to pay taxes.

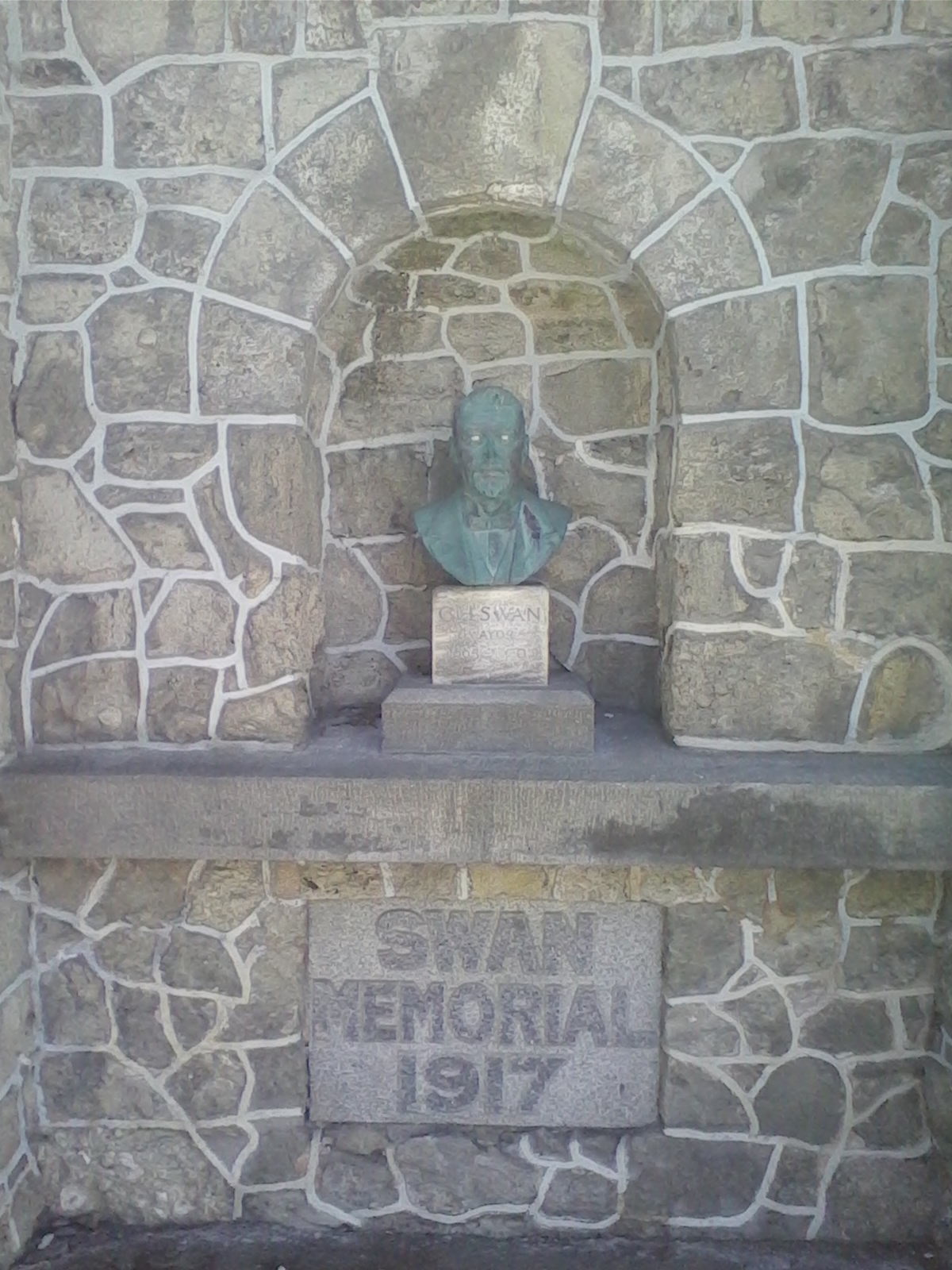
The Swan Memorial, Napier.

Swan owned his own brewery. He was initially a photographer by trade.

He died in Whanganui on 25 July 1913. He married an actress, Frances Stopher in 1884. She died in Whanganui in 1939.

New Zealand Parliament
Preceded by John Davies Ormond	Member of Parliament for Napier; 1890–1893	Succeeded by Samuel Carnell
