= Clyde Jeffery =

Mayor of Napier, New Zealand

Clyde Molesworth Jeffery QSO BEM JP (26 February 1917 – 23 June 2002) was the Mayor of Napier, New Zealand, from 1974 to 1983, having been a Napier City Councillor from 1962 to 1974.

He was born in Napier and educated at Napier Boys' High School. He married Sybil Nicol in 1951, and was employed in the menswear industry.

He was in the RNZAF as a flight sergeant for six years in World War II, being awarded the British Empire Medal for outstanding service in Bougainville in 1945. He was awarded the Queen Elizabeth II Silver Jubilee Medal in 1977, and in the 1985 New Year Honours he was appointed a Companion of the Queen's Service Order for public services. In 1989, he was made freeman of Napier.
