= Henry Stokes Tiffen =

New Zealand politician

Henry Stokes Tiffen (12 July 1816 – 21 February 1896) was a notable New Zealand surveyor, pastoralist, land commissioner, politician, community leader, horticulturist and entrepreneur. He was born in Hythe, Kent, England in 1816. He arrived in New Zealand on 9 February 1842 and spent most of his life in Hawke's Bay.
