= 1947 Westland by-election =

New Zealand by-election

← 1946 general	3 December 1947	1949 general →
- Turnout: 12,886 (90.35%)
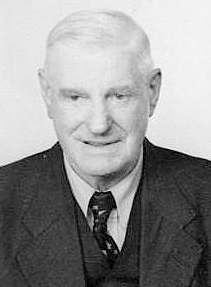

Candidate	Jim Kent	Jack Lockington
Party	Labour	National
Popular vote	7,427	5,405
Percentage	57.88	42.12
Member before election
James O'Brien
Labour
Elected Member
Jim Kent
Labour

The 1947 Westland by-election was a by-election held during the 28th New Zealand Parliament in the South Island electorate of Westland. The by-election occurred following the death of MP James O'Brien and was won by Jim Kent.

== Background ==
James O'Brien, who was first elected to represent Westland for the Labour Party in 1922 and had been Westland's MP continuously since 1928, died on 28 September 1947. This triggered the Westland by-election, which occurred on 3 December 1947.

== Candidates ==
Labour
There were six nominations for the Labour Party candidacy:

- Paddy Blanchfield, the Deputy Mayor of Greymouth and member of the Grey Power Board
- William J. Butler, a press gallery journalist for the Grey River Argus newspaper and former Labour Party South Island organiser
- Ernie Heenan, a Hokitika businessman who was chairman of the Greymouth Harbour Board and member of the Westland Hospital Board
- Jim Kent, a Greymouth Borough Councillor and former chairman of the Greymouth Harbour Board
- Mark Wallace, a Kokatahi farmer and member of the Westland County Council
- Robert James Ware, district organiser of post office national savings and president of the Greymouth branch of the Labour Party and vice-president of the Westland Labour Representation Committee

The former Speaker of the House of Representatives and Auckland East MP Bill Schramm, who was defeated in 1946 and was originally from Hokitika, was also speculated as a possible candidate but later dismissed. Ware was selected as the candidate on 24 October. Five days later Ware was taken ill suddenly, the same day he was to have opened his campaign at a meeting in Ngahere. After receiving advice from his doctor he withdrew his candidacy. After Ware's withdrawal Kent was selected as the candidate on 31 October.

National
Several names were put forward for the National Party candidacy:

- Gordon Gillespie, a Greymouth businessman
- Jack Lockington, a farmer from Reefton
- Martin Nestor, the National Party's chief research officer

Two previous National candidates from past elections, Ted Taylor and Frank Chivers, were also considered. Both declined nomination, as did Patrick Joseph O'Regan, a farmer from Inangahua Junction, owing to health reasons. Lockington was selected by a meeting of delegates and members of the Westland electoral committee at Greymouth on 28 October.

Others
After being unsuccessful in attaining the official Labour nomination, there was speculation that Wallace would stand as an Independent Labour candidate. This did not eventuate however.

== Previous election ==
1946 general election: Westland
Party	Candidate	Votes	%	±%
Labour	James O'Brien	9,097	67.21	
National	Frank Chivers	4,381	32.36	
Informal votes		57	0.42	
Majority		4,716	34.99	
Turnout		13,535	94.45	
Registered electors		14,330		

== Results ==
The following table gives the election results:

1947 Westland by-election
Party	Candidate	Votes	%	±%
Labour	Jim Kent	7,427	57.64	
National	Jack Lockington	5,405	41.95	
Informal votes		54	0.41	−0.01
Majority		2,022	15.76	
Turnout		12,886	90.35	−4.10
Registered electors		14,262		
Labour hold		Swing		

Kent obtained 57.9% of the votes and was successful.

== See also ==
- List of New Zealand by-elections
