= First Labour Government of New Zealand =

Government of New Zealand, 1935–1949

First Labour Government
- Ministries of New Zealand
- 1935–1949
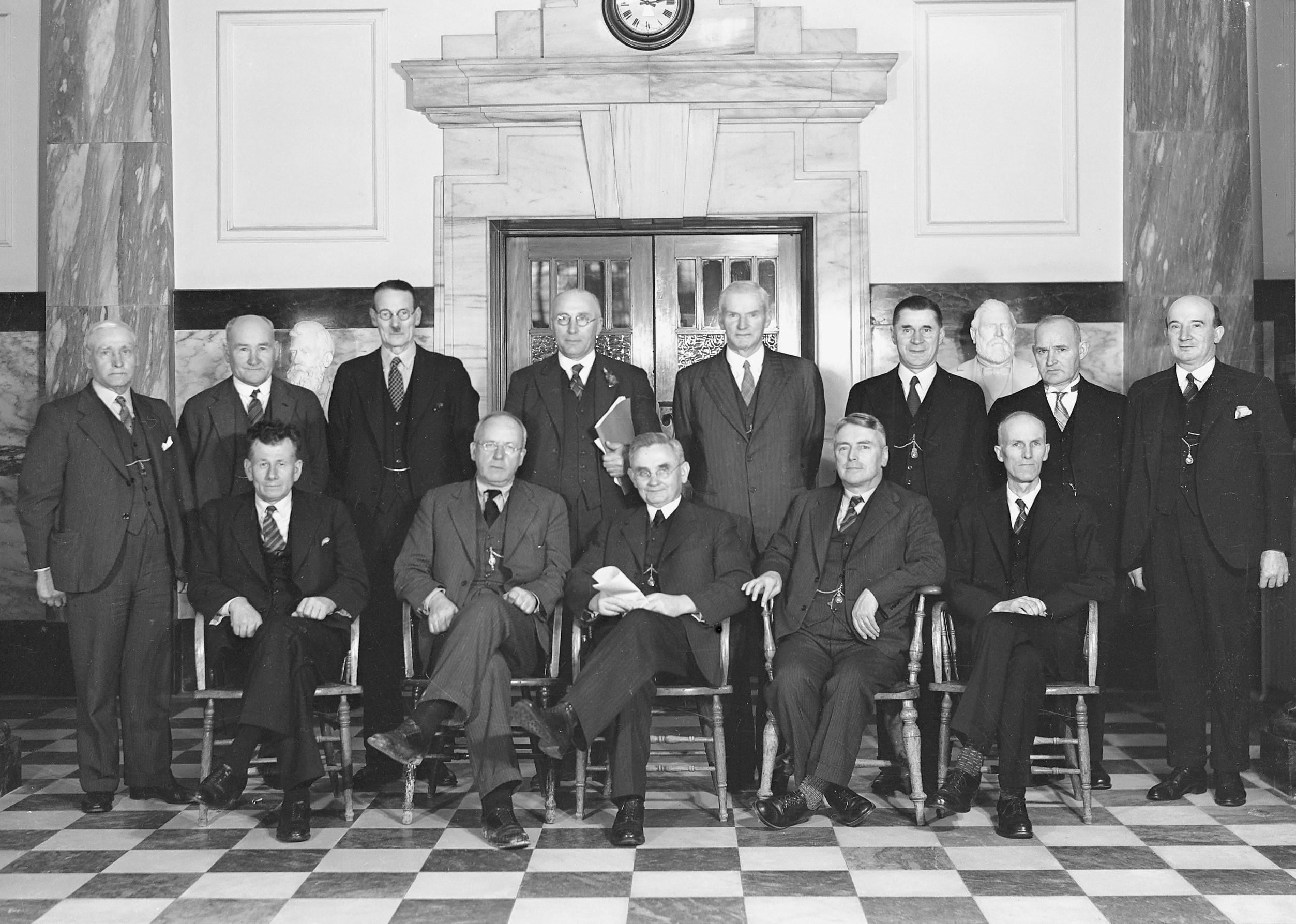
- Date formed: 6 December 1935
- Date dissolved: 13 December 1949

People and organisations
- Monarch: George V Edward VIII; George VI
- Prime Minister: Michael Joseph Savage (1935–40); Peter Fraser (1940–49)
- Deputy Prime Minister: Peter Fraser (1935–40); Walter Nash (1940–49)
- Member party: Labour Party
- Status in legislature: Majority
- Opposition party: United–Reform Coalition (1935–1936); National Party (1936–1949)
- Opposition leader: George Forbes (1935–1936); Adam Hamilton (1936–1940); Sidney Holland (1940–1949)

History
- Elections: 1935 general election; 1938 general election; 1943 general election; 1946 general election
- Predecessor: United–Reform coalition Government of New Zealand
- Successor: First National Government of New Zealand

The First Labour Government of New Zealand governed New Zealand from 1935 to 1949. Responsible for the realisation of a wide range of 'progressive' social reforms, it set the tone of New Zealand's economic and welfare policies until the 1980s, establishing a welfare state, a system of Keynesian economic management, and high levels of state intervention. It took power towards the end of, and as a result of, the Great Depression of the 1930s, and governed throughout World War II. It was in office for fourteen years, through four terms, including one five-year term due to a war-time election being postponed for two years.

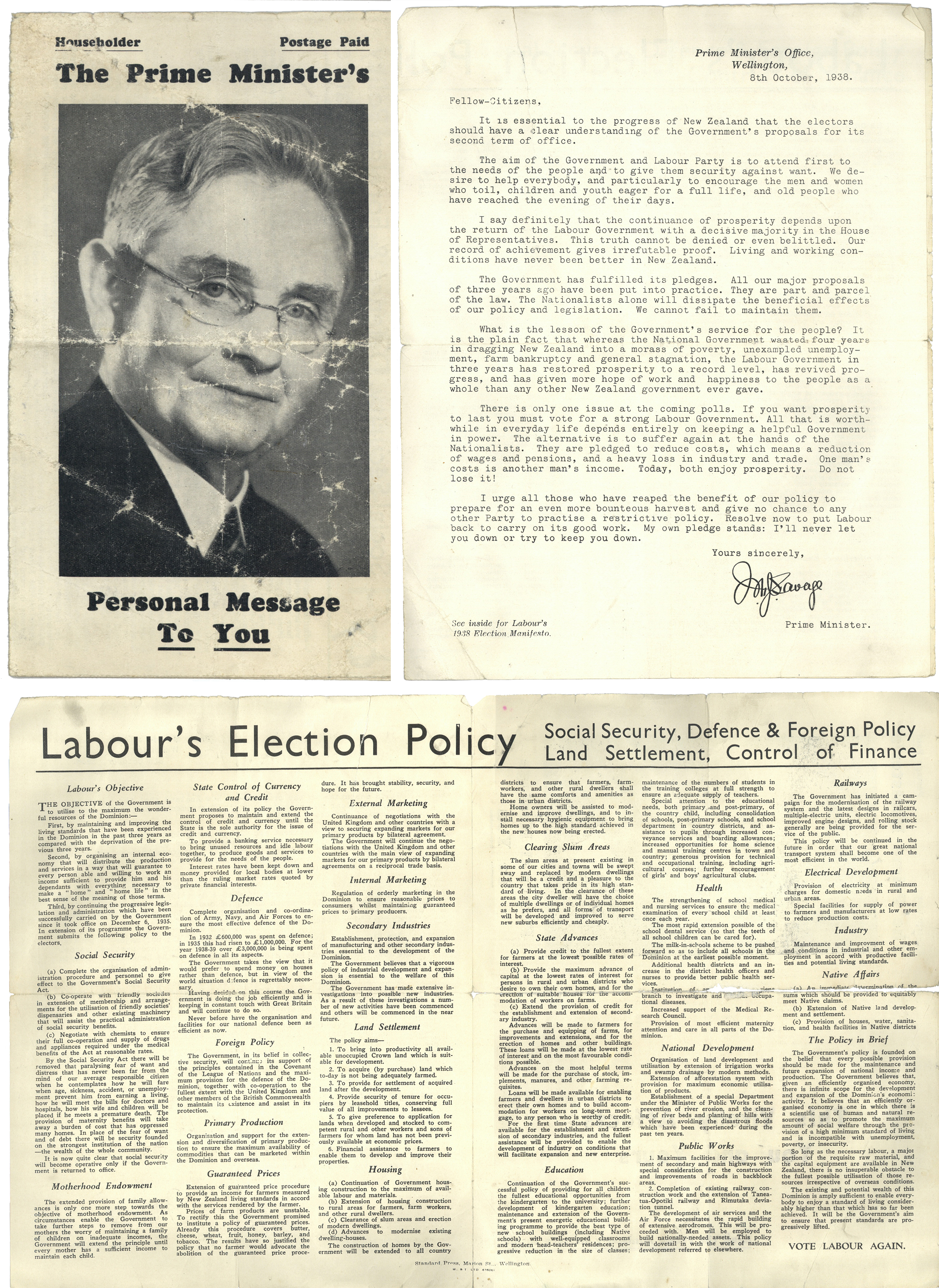
Political manifesto printed by the Labour Party before it was elected in 1938

== Foreign affairs and military ==
In the 1930s, the New Zealand Labour Party was a supporter of the League of Nations (a forerunner to the United Nations), seeing the League as the best way to prevent another major war. However the League proved to be ineffectual, and was unable to prevent the Japanese invasion of Manchuria or the Italian invasion of Abyssinia. Under Labour, the New Zealand representative to the League spoke strongly against appeasement of aggressors, particularly the Italian invasion of Abyssinia and the German occupation of Czechoslovakia. When World War II broke out, New Zealand immediately declared war on Germany, with Savage saying that "where Britain goes, we go". Conscription was introduced during the war, which led some to accuse Labour of hypocrisy, as it had strongly opposed conscription in World War I. The government argued that while the First World War had been an unnecessary imperialist scuffle, the Second World War was a just war against fascist aggressors. Following the war, Fraser was involved in the setting up of the United Nations, and was especially concerned that small countries not be marginalised by the great powers. Peacetime conscription was introduced in 1949, which proved to be an unpopular decision.

== Constitutional ==
The Statute of Westminster Adoption Act 1947 was passed to adopt the Statute of Westminster 1931. This was a significant step to the Independence of New Zealand. Technically New Zealand ceased to be the Dominion of New Zealand and became the Realm of New Zealand, and was fully able to direct its own foreign affairs and military. It also legally separated the British Crown from a New Zealand Crown, meaning that the New Zealand monarchy became legally independent of the British monarchy, and thus the Sovereign of the United Kingdom also became the Sovereign of New Zealand (the first monarch to be declared as such was Queen Elizabeth II in 1952, as Queen of New Zealand).

The country quota was abolished (effective for the 1946 election) so that rural and urban electorates contained the same number of voters.

== 1935 election and government formation ==
The immediate context of the 1935 election was the Great Depression which had started in 1929 and affected New Zealand as badly as most other Western countries. Following the 1931 election the Reform and United (also known as Liberal) parties had formed a coalition to deal with it. The Labour Party formed the opposition, arguing that the only way out of the depression was socialism. The coalition government instead supported the economic orthodoxy which was that a balanced budget was of paramount importance and that state spending had to be cut to offset the decline in taxation revenue. They also believed that to provide the unemployed with money without making them work was morally wrong, and so put thousands of unemployed to work on often-pointless 'relief work'. Labour argued that the government needed to increase spending and create real jobs.

By 1935 – after the election had been delayed a year because of the depression – many voters who would not otherwise have trusted Labour were disillusioned with the economic orthodoxy and prepared to try something new. Labour was helped by a change of leadership in 1933, after leader Harry Holland died and was replaced by Michael Joseph Savage, who did not seem to be a frightening communist but rather a kindly uncle figure. Labour achieved an overwhelming victory, taking 53 out of 80 seats. A further two were won by the Māori Rātana movement, which formed an alliance with Labour. Despite the size of its victory, Labour won only 46.1% of the popular vote; the government vote was split between Reform and United, and both parties lost votes on the right to the Democrats and the Country Party.

Carl Berendsen, the head of the Prime Minister's Department later said that the first cabinet consisted of "a trio of able men" (Savage, Fraser and Nash), "a witty and worthy toiler" (Semple) "and a gaggle of non-entities". Six of the ministers were born in New Zealand, five in Australia, and one each in England and Scotland. More than half of Labour's caucus were new to Parliament. Berendsen wrote that Nash was a poor administrator and organiser, he:

could not bear to make a decision. Papers piled up in his office. They stayed there for days and weeks, or months or years, and sometime forever. ... (and he) devoted a great deal of time and care to "going over these papers" .... He even carried these heirlooms with him to Washington. This habit of holding papers caused serious dislocation of public business.

== 1938 election ==
The government increased in popularity during its first term, as people felt the benefits of its policies and of economic recovery. It cannot realistically be credited with ending the Depression in New Zealand, as most economic indicators were showing signs of improvement before the 1935 election. However government policies such as an increase in pay for relief workers, job creation and generous education policies did bring major benefits to many. Labour's share of the popular vote increased by nearly 10%, but it did not gain any new seats. While in 1935 the anti-Labour vote had been split between two major and two minor parties, by 1938 the United and Reform parties had merged into the New Zealand National Party, which was able to achieve 40.3% of the popular vote and win 25 seats. The Country and Democrat parties' share of the vote collapsed, with the Country Party losing both its seats. From this point on, New Zealand politics would be dominated by the Labour and National parties.

== 1943 election ==
The 1943 election was held during World War II, and had been postponed by about two years due to the war. Conscription was a minor issue in the election; although both major parties supported it, some saw Labour as hypocrites as they had strongly opposed conscription during World War I. The issue may have lost Labour some support on the left to the Democratic Labour Party, which had been formed by dissident Labour MP John A. Lee following his expulsion from the Labour Party. However the new party received only 4.3% of the vote and won no seats. Labour was given significant help by the votes of New Zealand soldiers overseas, who turned an apparent election-night victory for National into one for Labour; Fraser quipped that "it was not only North Africa that the Second Division had saved". The election was also notable for the defeat of Māori statesman Āpirana Ngata by the Labour-Ratana candidate Tiaka Omana. Labour was to hold the four Māori electorates until 1996.

== 1946 election ==
By 1946 the National Party had gained in strength and credibility. However its support was strongest in rural areas, and in previous elections it had benefited from the country quota, which organised New Zealand electorates so that rural electorates had fewer voters, and therefore rural votes were worth more. In 1945 the government had abolished the quota, which may have cost National the election. Labour gained nearly 4% of the popular vote, but lost three seats, reducing its majority to four. Since the seats it held included the four Māori electorates, the government was said by its opponents to rely on a 'Māori mandate'. It was insinuated that Labour would need to pass unwise pro-Māori policies to stay in power.

== Defeat ==
By 1949 the government had been in power for 14 years, six of them in wartime. It seemed increasingly worn out and uncertain. The three referendums held in 1949 (in addition to the usual referendum on alcohol licensing, which was held in conjunction with every election), were symptomatic of this. Meanwhile, National had announced that it would not repeal any of Labour's welfare state policies, which endeared it to many who had supported and benefitted from these policies but were tired of the government. National won 51.9% of the popular vote and 46 of out the 80 seats in parliament. Labour would be out of power for another eight years, and would not be in government for more than a single term until 1987.

== Election results ==
Election	Parliament	Seats	Total votes	Percentage	Gain (loss)	Seats won	Change	Majority
1935	25th	80	852,637	46.1%	▲11.8%	53	▲29	26
1938	26th	80	946,393	55.8%	▲9.7%	53	–	26
1943	27th	80	941,828	47.6%	▼8.2%	45	▼8	10
1946	28th	80	1,047,210	51.3%	▲3.7%	42	▼3	4
1949	29th	80	1,073,154	47.2%	▼4.1%	34	▼8	-

== Prime ministers ==
The government was led by Michael Joseph Savage until his death in 1940. He was succeeded by Peter Fraser, who was prime minister for the rest of the government's term. Wilson gives the dates of office-holding as 6 December 1935 to 1 April 1940 for the Savage Ministry (although Savage died on 27 March), and 1 April 1940 to 13 December 1949 for the Fraser Ministry.

Prime ministers of the First Labour Government

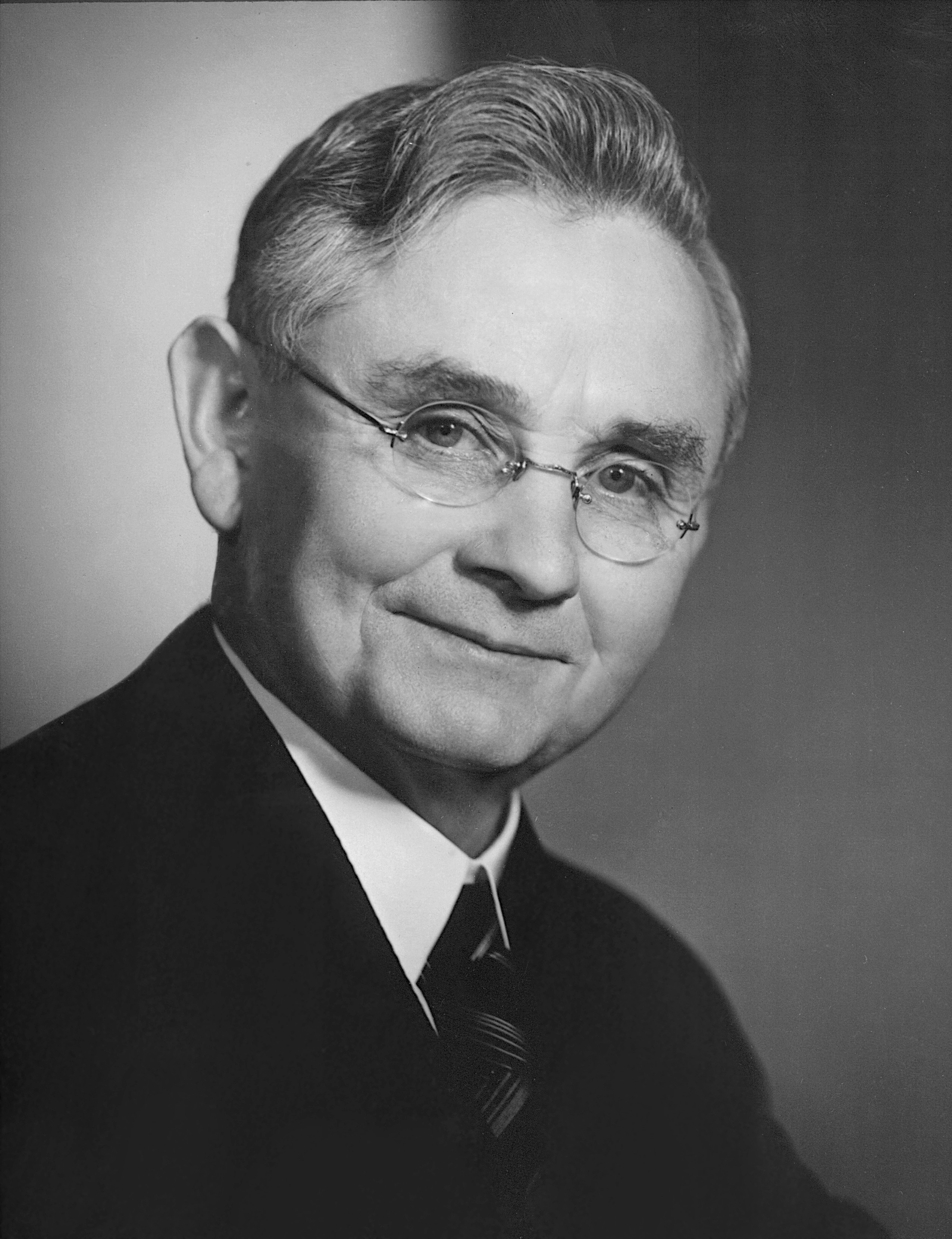
Michael Joseph Savage
served 1935–1940

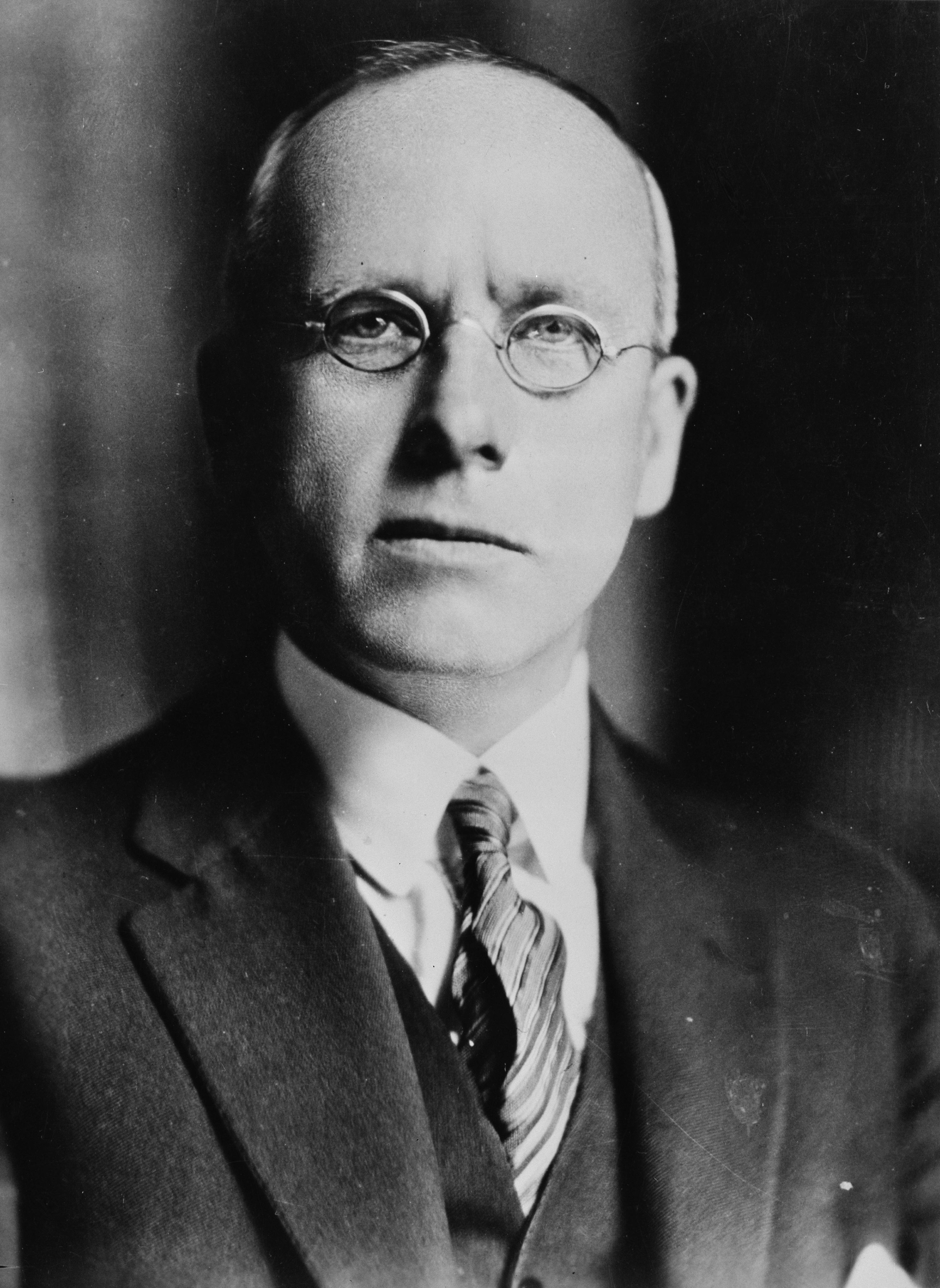
Peter Fraser
served 1940–1949

== Cabinet ministers ==
Portfolio	Minister	Start	End
Prime Minister	Michael Joseph Savage	6 December 1935	27 March 1940
Prime Minister	Peter Fraser	27 March 1940	13 December 1949
Minister of Agriculture	Lee Martin	6 December 1935	21 January 1941
Minister of Agriculture	Jim Barclay	21 January 1941	18 October 1943
Minister of Agriculture	Ben Roberts	18 October 1943	19 December 1946
Minister of Agriculture	Ted Cullen	19 December 1946	13 December 1949
Attorney-General	Rex Mason	6 December 1935	13 December 1949
Minister of Customs	Walter Nash	6 December 1935	13 December 1949
Minister of Defence	Fred Jones	6 December 1935	13 December 1949
Minister of Education	Peter Fraser	6 December 1935	30 April 1940
Minister of Education	Rex Mason	30 April 1940	18 October 1947
Minister of Education	Terry McCombs	18 October 1947	13 December 1949
Minister of Finance	Walter Nash	6 December 1935	13 December 1949
Minister of Foreign Affairs	Michael Joseph Savage	6 December 1935	27 March 1940
Minister of Foreign Affairs	Frank Langstone	27 March 1940	21 December 1942
Minister of Foreign Affairs	Peter Fraser	7 July 1943	13 December 1949
Commissioner of State Forests	Frank Langstone	6 December 1935	21 December 1942
Commissioner of State Forests	Jim Barclay	7 July 1943	12 April 1944
Commissioner of State Forests	Jerry Skinner	12 April 1944	13 December 1949
Minister of Health	Peter Fraser	6 December 1935	30 April 1940
Minister of Health	Tim Armstrong	30 April 1940	21 January 1941
Minister of Health	Arnold Nordmeyer	21 January 1941	29 May 1947
Minister of Health	Mabel Howard	29 May 1947	13 December 1949
Minister of Housing	Tim Armstrong	13 December 1938	8 November 1942
Minister of Housing	Bob Semple	9 December 1942	13 December 1949
Minister of Immigration	Tim Armstrong	6 December 1935	30 April 1940
Minister of Immigration	David Wilson	30 April 1940	12 April 1944
Minister of Immigration	Paddy Webb	12 April 1944	19 December 1946
Minister of Immigration	Angus McLagan	19 December 1946	13 December 1949
Minister of Industries and Commerce	Dan Sullivan	6 December 1935	8 April 1947
Minister of Industries and Commerce	Arnold Nordmeyer	29 May 1947	13 December 1949
Minister of Internal Affairs	Bill Parry	6 December 1935	13 December 1949
Minister of Justice	Rex Mason	6 December 1935	13 December 1949
Minister of Island Territories	Michael Joseph Savage	6 December 1935	27 March 1940
Minister of Island Territories	Frank Langstone	1 April 1940	21 December 1942
Minister of Island Territories	Peter Fraser	7 July 1943	13 December 1949
Minister of Labour	Tim Armstrong	6 December 1935	13 December 1938
Minister of Labour	Paddy Webb	13 December 1938	27 June 1946
Minister of Labour	James O'Brien	27 June 1946	19 December 1946
Minister of Labour	Angus McLagan	19 December 1946	13 December 1949
Leader of the Legislative Council	Mark Fagan	25 March 1936	17 September 1939
Leader of the Legislative Council	David Wilson	17 September 1939	26 September 1944
Leader of the Legislative Council	Angus McLagan	26 September 1944	25 June 1947
Leader of the Legislative Council	David Wilson	25 June 1947	13 December 1949
Minister of Marine	Peter Fraser	6 December 1935	30 April 1940
Minister of Marine	Bob Semple	30 April 1940	12 June 1940
Minister of Marine	Gervan McMillan	12 June 1940	21 January 1941
Minister of Marine	Bob Semple	21 January 1941	19 December 1942
Minister of Marine	James O'Brien	19 December 1942	28 September 1947
Minister of Marine	Fred Hackett	28 September 1947	13 December 1949
Minister of Mines	Paddy Webb	6 December 1935	27 June 1946
Minister of Mines	James O'Brien	27 June 1946	19 December 1946
Minister of Mines	Angus McLagan	19 December 1946	13 December 1949
Minister of Native Affairs	Michael Joseph Savage	6 December 1935	27 March 1940
Minister of Native Affairs	Frank Langstone	1 April 1940	21 December 1942
Minister of Native Affairs	Rex Mason	7 July 1943	19 December 1946
Minister of Native Affairs	Peter Fraser	19 December 1946	13 December 1949
Minister of Police	Peter Fraser	6 December 1935	13 December 1949
Postmaster-General	Fred Jones	6 December 1935	1 April 1940
Postmaster-General	Paddy Webb	1 April 1940	19 December 1946
Postmaster-General	Fred Hackett	19 December 1946	13 December 1949
Minister of Railways	Dan Sullivan	6 December 1935	12 December 1941
Minister of Railways	Bob Semple	12 December 1941	13 December 1949
Minister of Revenue	Walter Nash	6 December 1935	13 December 1949
Minister for Social Security	Bill Parry	25 June 1946	13 December 1949
Minister of Transport	Bob Semple	6 December 1935	9 December 1942
Minister of Transport	James O'Brien	9 December 1942	28 September 1947
Minister of Transport	Fred Hackett	18 October 1947	13 December 1949
Minister without portfolio	Mark Fagan	6 December 1935	8 November 1939
Minister without portfolio	David Wilson	8 November 1939	13 December 1949
Minister without portfolio	Paraire Paikea	21 January 1941	6 May 1943
Minister without portfolio	Eruera Tirikatene	26 May 1943	13 December 1949
Minister of Works	Bob Semple	6 December 1935	21 January 1941
Minister of Works	Tim Armstrong	21 January 1941	8 November 1942
Minister of Works	Bob Semple	8 November 1942	13 December 1949

=== War cabinet ===
The following is a list of ministers from the "War cabinet" (16 July 1940 – 21 August 1945) and "War administration" (30 June 1942 – 2 October 1942). The other members were the Prime Minister, Minister of Defence, Minister of Finance and Minister of Transport (see above).

Party key	Labour
Party key	National
Party key	Independent

Portfolio	Minister	Start	End
Minister of Armed Forces and War-Co-ordination	Gordon Coates	30 June 1942	15 October 1942
Minister of Armed Forces and War-Co-ordination	Gordon Coates	15 October 1942	27 May 1943
Minister of Civil Defence	William Bodkin	30 June 1942	2 October 1942
Minister of Civil Defence	David Wilson	2 October 1942	12 April 1944
Minister of Industrial Manpower	Angus McLagan	30 June 1942	2 October 1942
Minister in Charge of Maori War Effort	Paraire Paikea	30 June 1942	2 October 1942
Minister of National Service	Walter Broadfoot	30 June 1942	2 October 1942
Minister of Primary Production for War Purposes	William Polson	30 June 1942	2 October 1942
Minister of Supply and Munitions	Dan Sullivan	16 July 1940	30 June 1942
Minister of Supply and Munitions	Adam Hamilton	30 June 1942	2 October 1942
Minister of Supply and Munitions	Dan Sullivan	2 October 1942	21 August 1945
Minister in Charge of War Expenditure	Sidney Holland	30 June 1942	2 October 1942
Minister in Charge of War Expenditure	Adam Hamilton	30 October 1942	22 August 1945

== See also ==
- List of New Zealand governments

== Notes ==
=== References ===
- Bassett, Michael (1998). The State in New Zealand 1840–1984: Socialism Without Doctrines?. Auckland: Auckland University Press. ISBN 1-86940-193-X.
- Bassett, Michael (2000). Tomorrow Comes the Song: A Life of Peter Fraser. Auckland: Penguin. ISBN 0-14-029793-6.
- Berendsen, Carl (2009). Mr Ambassador: Memoirs of Sir Carl Berendsen. Wellington: Victoria University Press. ISBN 9780864735843.
- Brooking, Tom (2004). The History of New Zealand. Greenwood Histories of the Modern Nations. Greenwood Publishing Group. ISBN 9780313323560.
- Chambers, John H. (2013). A Traveller's History of New Zealand and the South Pacific Islands (2nd ed.). Interlink Books. ISBN 9781566565066.
- Mein Smith, Philippa (2012) [2005]. A Concise History of New Zealand (2nd ed.). Melbourne: Cambridge University Press. ISBN 978-1-107-40217-1.
- Sinclair, Keith (1959). A History of New Zealand.
- Wilson, Jim (1985) [First published in 1913]. New Zealand Parliamentary Record, 1840–1984 (4th ed.). Wellington: V.R. Ward, Govt. Printer. OCLC 154283103.
