= 1906 Westland by-election =

New Zealand by-election

- 13 July 1906
- Turnout: 91.12%
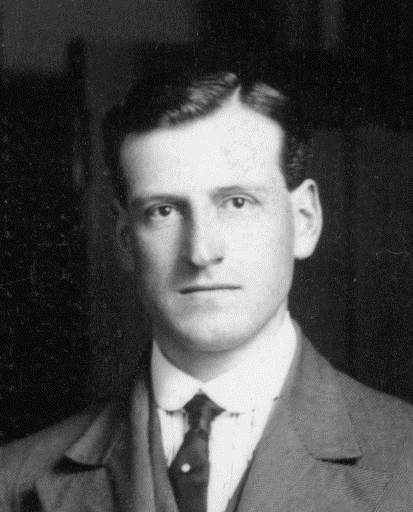

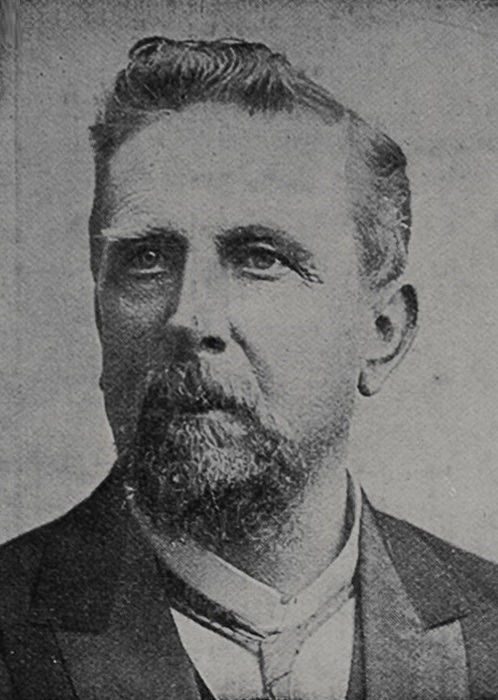
Candidate	Tom Seddon	Henry Michel
Party	Liberal	Conservative
Popular vote	2,403	1,683
Percentage	58.81	41.18
Member before election
Richard Seddon
Liberal
Elected Member
Tom Seddon
Liberal

The Westland by-election was a by-election in the New Zealand electorate of Westland, a semi-urban seat at the west coast of the South Island.

The by-election was held on 13 July 1906, and was precipitated by the death of sitting MP, Prime Minister Richard Seddon. The seat was won by his son, Thomas. His sole opponent was Henry Michel, former Mayor of Hokitika.

== Results ==
The following table gives the election results:

1906 Westland by-election
Party	Candidate	Votes	%	±%
Liberal	Tom Seddon	2,403	58.81	
Conservative	Henry Michel	1,683	41.18	
Majority		720	17.62	
Turnout		4,086	91.12	+10.05
Registered electors		4,484		
