= Tom Seddon =

New Zealand politician (1884–1972)

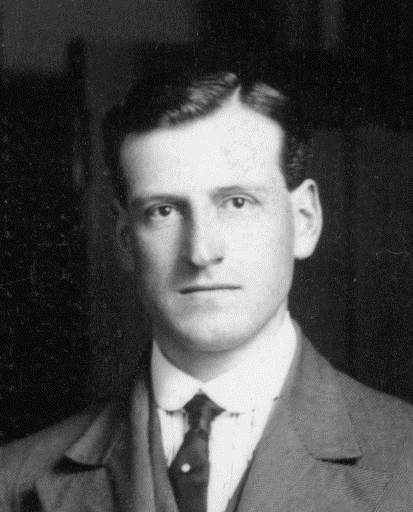
- Seddon in 1913

Member of the New Zealand Parliament for Westland
- In office 4 November 1925 – 14 November 1928
- Preceded by: James O'Brien
- Succeeded by: James O'Brien
- In office 13 July 1906 – 7 December 1922
- Preceded by: Richard Seddon
- Succeeded by: James O'Brien

Personal details
- Born: Thomas Edward Youd Seddon; 2 July 1884 Kumara, New Zealand
- Died: 22 January 1972 (aged 87) Wellington, New Zealand
- Party: Liberal
- Spouse: Beatrice Ann Wood
- Parent(s): Richard Seddon; Louisa Spotswood
- Relatives: Elizabeth Gilmer (sister)
- Education: Victoria University
- Profession: Lawyer

Thomas Edward Youd Seddon (2 July 1884 – 22 January 1972) was a New Zealand politician of the Liberal Party, and a lawyer in Greymouth. He was the son of New Zealand's longest-serving prime minister Richard Seddon, and succeeded his father as MP for Westland following his death in 1906.

== Early life ==
Seddon was born in Kumara in 1884. His parents were Richard and Louisa Jane Seddon (née Spotswood). He was educated at Kumara School, the Terrace School (Wellington), Wellington College, and Victoria University College. He graduated in law, and joined the practice of John Findlay and Frederick George Dalziell, and then became a barrister and solicitor in Greymouth.

He served in the New Zealand Army in World War I from 1915 to 1919. Because he received a leg injury in a rugby game "behind the trenches" he was not gassed like the rest of his unit. Later he was chairman of the War Pensions Board, from 1930 to 1963, and in World War II he was Captain of the Wadestown Home Guard.

He married Beatrice Ann Wood on 15 March 1922 at St Mary's Church in the Christchurch suburb of Merivale. Guests at the wedding included Robert Loughnan, Joseph Grimmond, George Fowlds, and Joseph Ward.

== Political career ==
New Zealand Parliament
Years	Term	Electorate	Party
1906–1908	16th	Westland	Liberal
1908–1911	17th	Westland	Liberal
1911–1914	18th	Westland	Liberal
1914–1919	19th	Westland	Liberal
1919–1922	20th	Westland	Liberal
1925–1928	22nd	Westland	Liberal
1928	Changed allegiance to:		United

He inherited the Westland electorate on the sudden death of his father Richard Seddon in the 1906 by-election after he had just turned 22. He held the electorate to 1922, when he was defeated by James O'Brien of the Labour Party. He won it back in 1925, but lost it again in 1928 when he was again defeated by O'Brien.

He was chairman of the War Pensions Board from 1930 to 1963, having served in the New Zealand Army in World War I,

In 1935, he was awarded the King George V Silver Jubilee Medal, and in 1953 he received the Queen Elizabeth II Coronation Medal. His son, Dick Seddon, was for several decades electorate secretary and organiser for the New Zealand National Party.

== Bibliography ==
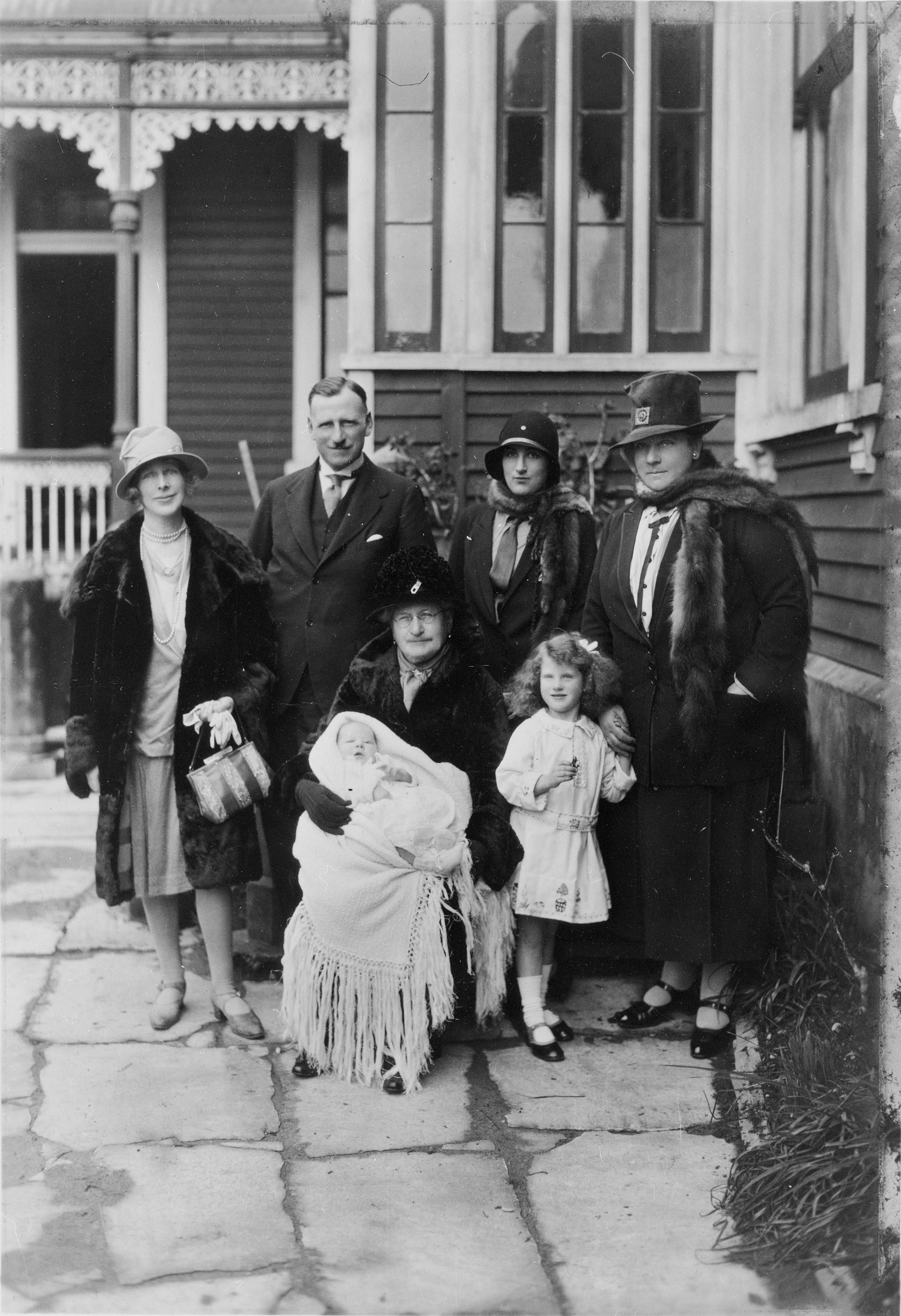
Tom Seddon with members of his family in circa 1929

His autobiography was published in 1968:

- Seddon, Thomas Edward Youd (1968). The Seddons: An Autobiography. Auckland, London: Collins.

== Notes and references ==
=== References ===
- Scholefield, Guy, ed. (1925) [First published in 1908]. Who's who in New Zealand and the western Pacific (2nd ed.). Masterton: Guy Scholefield.
- Who’s Who in New Zealand (1968, 9th edition)

New Zealand Parliament
Preceded by Richard Seddon	Member of Parliament for Westland; 1906–1922 1925–1928	Succeeded by James O'Brien
Preceded by James O'Brien	Member of Parliament for Westland; 1906–1922 1925–1928	Succeeded by James O'Brien
