= Mark Wallace (community leader) =

New Zealand cheesemaker and politician (1893–1984)

Markey Wallace CBE JP (5 November 1893 – 20 May 1984), generally known as Mark Wallace, was a notable New Zealand cheesemaker, farmer, community leader and local politician. He was born at Waiho, South Westland, New Zealand, in 1893. He was chairman of Westland County Council for 13 years. He stood in the 1954 election in the Westland electorate as an independent, but was defeated by Labour's incumbent, Jim Kent.

In 1953, Wallace was awarded the Queen Elizabeth II Coronation Medal. He was appointed a Member of the Order of the British Empire in the 1965 Queen's Birthday Honours, for services to local government and farming. In the 1977 Queen's Silver Jubilee and Birthday Honours, Wallace was promoted to Commander of the Order of the British Empire.

== See also ==
- List of cheesemakers
