= Mark Fagan =

New Zealand politician (1873–1947)

The Honourable Mark Fagan
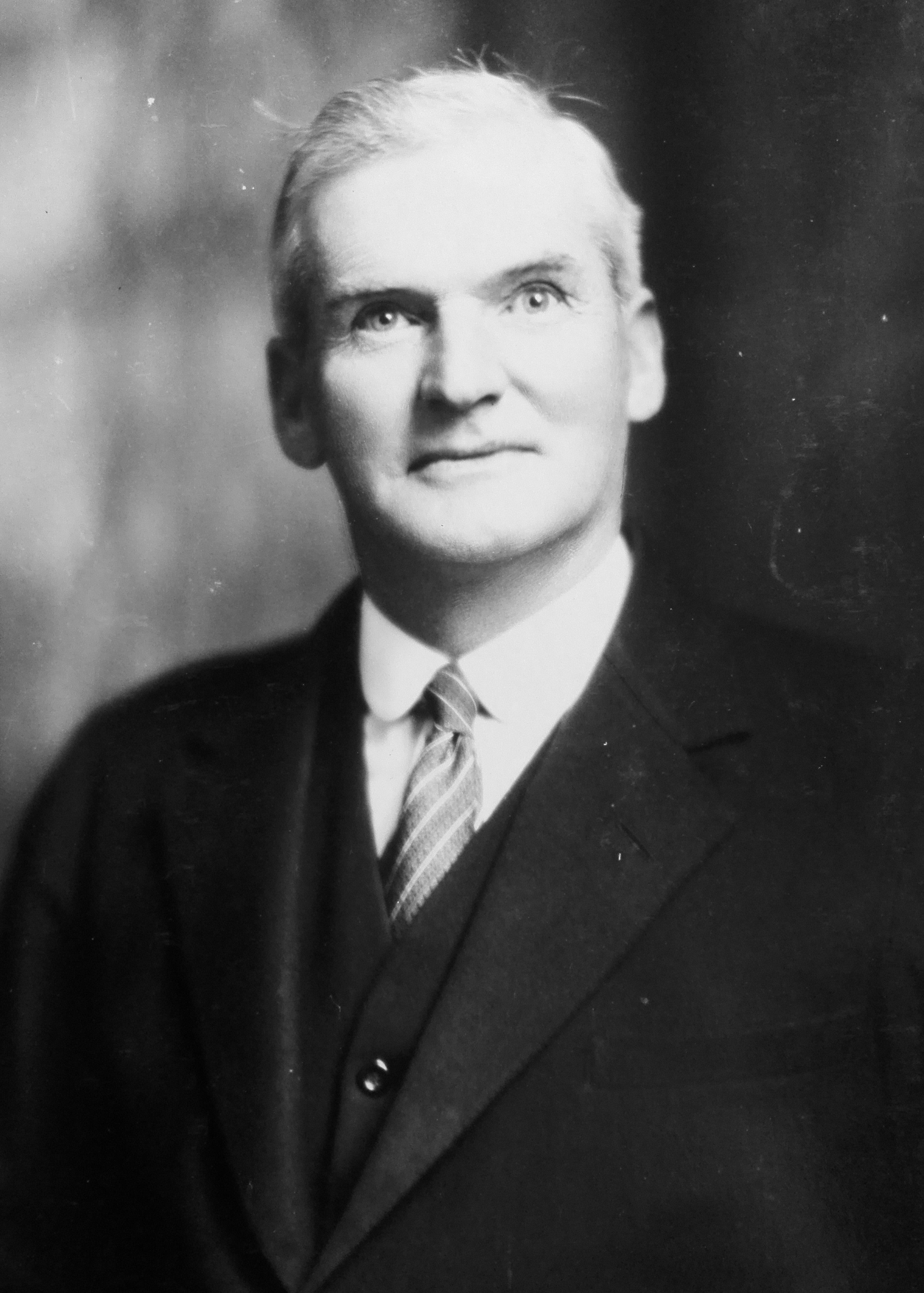
- Fagan in 1930

16th Speaker of the Legislative Council
- In office 18 July 1939 – 31 December 1947
- Preceded by: Walter Carncross
- Succeeded by: Bernard Martin

Personal details
- Born: 17 November 1873 Gaffneys Creek, Victoria, Australia
- Died: 31 December 1947 (aged 74) Petone, New Zealand
- Party: Labour
- Spouse: Monica Fagan
- Children: 3

Mark Anthony Fagan (17 November 1873 – 31 December 1947) was a New Zealand politician of the Labour Party and a union secretary. He was Speaker of the Legislative Council from 1939 until his death.

== Biography ==
=== Early life ===
Fagan was born at Gaffneys Creek, Victoria, Australia, in 1873, and went to school in Waratah, Tasmania until he was 10. He then worked in various Australian towns as a miner. By the time he came to New Zealand about 1900, he had split from his first wife. In the West Coast mining community he was the "voice of thoughtful militancy in the 'Red' federation" of Labour. His second marriage was to Monica McKittrick (née Gardiner), a widow with three children whom he married on 10 September 1917 in Christchurch.

=== Political career ===
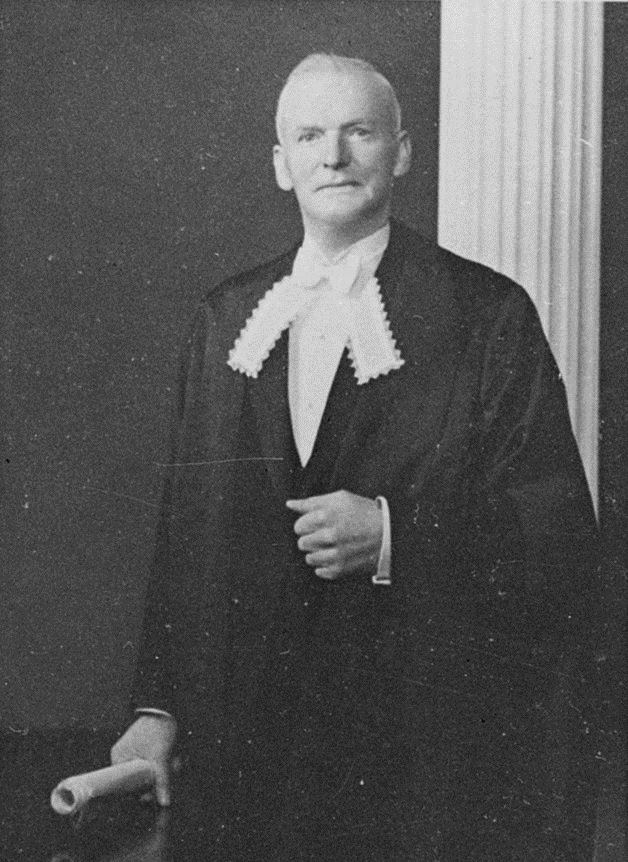
Fagan as Speaker of the Legislative Council.

Fagan was expected by many to stand in the 1918 Grey by-election after the sitting member, Paddy Webb, was jailed for his vocal opposition to conscription, but the Labour Party hierarchy chose Harry Holland from Wellington instead based on the latter's strong showing in the Wellington North by-election a few months prior. Fagan stood in the 1925 general election in the Motueka electorate, but was beaten by the incumbent, Richard Hudson of the Reform Party. In 1928, he moved to Petone in the Hutt Valley and in the following year, he was the organiser for Walter Nash's successful Hutt by-election. Fagan was on Labour's National Executive from 1930.

On 11 June 1930 he was appointed to the Legislative Council by the United Government, and at the end of each seven-year term, he was reappointed twice. He was reappointed by the United-Reform Coalition on 11 June 1935, and was reappointed by the First Labour Government on 11 June 1944. He was Speaker from 18 July 1939 until his death. He was a Minister without portfolio in the first Labour Government from 6 December 1935 until 18 July 1939, and was acting Minister of Customs in 1939 when Walter Nash was overseas.

In 1935, he was awarded the King George V Silver Jubilee Medal.

=== Death ===
His wife Monica died in 1932, being survived by three daughters from her first marriage. He died in Petone, Wellington on 31 December 1947. The Fagans are buried at Karori Cemetery.

== Notes ==
Government offices
Preceded by Robert Masters	Leader of the Legislative Council; 1936-1939	Succeeded by David Wilson
Political offices
Preceded by Walter Carncross	Speaker of the New Zealand Legislative Council; 1939–1947	Succeeded by Bernard Martin
