= Angus McLagan =

New Zealand politician

The Honourable Angus McLagan
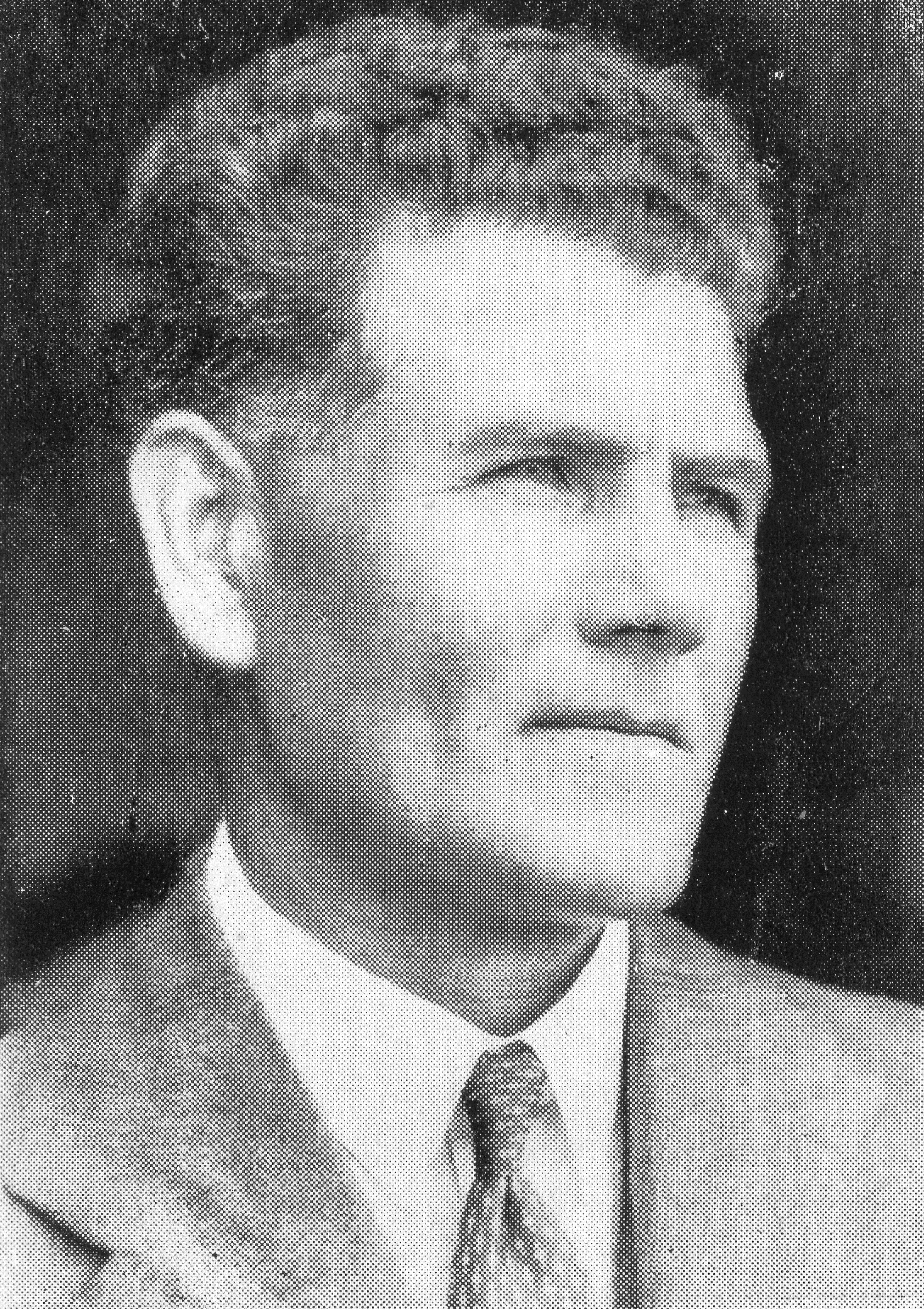

17th Minister of Labour
- In office 19 December 1946 – 13 December 1949
- Prime Minister: Peter Fraser
- Preceded by: James O'Brien
- Succeeded by: Bill Sullivan

30th Minister of Immigration
- In office 19 December 1946 – 13 December 1949
- Prime Minister: Peter Fraser
- Preceded by: Paddy Webb
- Succeeded by: Bill Sullivan

Member of the New Zealand Parliament for Riccarton
- In office 27 November 1946 – 4 September 1956
- Preceded by: Jack Watts
- Succeeded by: Mick Connelly

Personal details
- Born: 1891 Mid Calder, Midlothian, Scotland
- Died: 4 September 1956 (aged 64–65) Christchurch, New Zealand
- Party: Labour
- Spouse: Sophie McLagan
- Relations: 4

Angus McLagan (1891 – 4 September 1956) was a New Zealand politician of the Labour Party. He was a member of the Legislative Council and later Member of Parliament for Riccarton. He was a cabinet minister from 1942 to 1949 in the First Labour Government.

== Biography ==
=== Early life and career ===
McLagan was born in the Scottish village of Mid Calder, Midlothian, and left school at fourteen to work in the West Calder mines. He emigrated to New Zealand in 1911 and settled in Greymouth. He worked in the Grey Valley mines before briefly moving to Brunner, but he moved back to Greymouth in 1938. In 1940 he shifted again to Rangiora before finally moving to Christchurch in 1947.

He was an active trade unionist all his life. In 1927 he was elected as the first Secretary of the United Mine Workers of New Zealand, holding the position until 1935. In 1937 he was elected as the inaugural President of the New Zealand Federation of Labour (FOL) until 1946 when he resigned.

=== Political career ===
New Zealand Parliament
Years	Term	Electorate	Party
1946–1949	28th	Riccarton	Labour
1949–1951	29th	Riccarton	Labour
1951–1954	30th	Riccarton	Labour
1954–1956	31st	Riccarton	Labour

His political career began in local-body politics. He was a member of both the Greymouth Borough Council and Brunner Borough Council.

McLagan was appointed to the Legislative Council in 1942 by Prime Minister Peter Fraser until he resigned from it in 1946 to contest a seat in the lower house. From 1944 to 1947 he was Leader of the Legislative Council. During World War II, from 1942 to 1946, he was Minister of National Service and Minister of Industrial Manpower.

Following his resignation from the Legislative Council he was elected to the House of Representatives as member for the Riccarton electorate from the 1946 general election to 1956, when he died. Following the 1946 election he was appointed by Fraser as Minister of Labour, Minister of Immigration, Minister of Employment and Minister of Mines.

Following Labour's defeat at the 1949 general election he was a member of the opposition frontbench under first Fraser and later Walter Nash. In 1951 he was nominated to stand for the deputy leadership of the party, but he declined the nomination. In 1953, he was awarded the Queen Elizabeth II Coronation Medal.

A dour, squarely-built Scot, he was self-educated and well-read, and could write shorthand (which was useful in demolishing the speeches of opponents). He was grim and aloft; his speeches were cold, logical and often bitter; and some civil servants and others thought he had the best brain in Cabinet.

=== Death ===
McLagan was hospitalised in early August 1956 with a chest complaint. He died on 4 September 1956, survived by his wife, two sons and two daughters.

== Family ==
McLagan was married to Sophie McLagan (her second marriage). They had two daughters (Cissie Agnes McLagan, Margaret Bridget McLagan) and two sons (Angus and John Campbell (Jock) McLagan).

== Notes ==
Government offices
Preceded by David Wilson	Leader of the Legislative Council; 1944-1947	Succeeded by David Wilson
Political offices
Preceded by James O'Brien	Minister of Labour; 1946–1949	Succeeded by Bill Sullivan
Preceded by Paddy Webb	Minister of Immigration; 1946–1949	Succeeded by Bill Sullivan
New Zealand Parliament
Preceded by Jack Watts	Member of Parliament for Riccarton; 1946–1956	Succeeded by Mick Connelly
