= Leader of the Legislative Council =

In the New Zealand Parliament, the leader of the Legislative Council was a government minister appointed by the prime minister to be responsible for the management of government business in the Legislative Council until its abolition.

The office was created to delegate authority for a member of the Legislative Council (MLC) to introduce government legislation on behalf of the prime minister (who was normally a member of the House of Representatives instead).

== List of holders ==
The following individuals held the office of leader of the Legislative Council.

Key

Independent Liberal Reform United Labour National

No.	Name	Portrait	Term of Office		Government
1	Frederick Whitaker		12 May 1856	24 May 1856	Sewell
1	Frederick Whitaker		12 May 1856	24 May 1856	Fox I
2	Ralph Richardson		24 May 1856	2 June 1856	Fox I
(1)	Frederick Whitaker		2 June 1856	16 July 1861	Stafford I
(1)	Frederick Whitaker		2 June 1856	16 July 1861	Fox II
3	Daniel Pollen		16 July 1861	6 August 1862	Fox II
4	Henry Tancred		6 August 1862	2 November 1863	Domett
4	Henry Tancred		6 August 1862	2 November 1863	Whitaker I
(1)	Frederick Whitaker		2 November 1863	24 November 1864	Whitaker I
5	Henry Sewell		24 November 1864	26 July 1865	Weld
6	James Crowe Richmond		26 July 1865	17 October 1865	Weld
7	Andrew Russell		17 October 1865	July 1866	Stafford II
8	John Johnston		July 1866	July 1867	Stafford II
9	John Richardson		July 1867	July 1868	Stafford II
(3)	Daniel Pollen		July 1868	2 July 1869	Stafford II
(3)	Daniel Pollen		July 1868	2 July 1869	Fox III
10	William Gisborne		2 July 1869	10 September 1872	Fox III
(5)	Henry Sewell		10 September 1872	11 October 1872	Stafford III
11	George Waterhouse		11 October 1872	15 July 1873	Waterhouse
11	George Waterhouse		11 October 1872	15 July 1873	Fox IV
11	George Waterhouse		11 October 1872	15 July 1873	Vogel I
(3)	Daniel Pollen		15 July 1873	16 October 1877	Vogel I
(3)	Daniel Pollen		15 July 1873	16 October 1877	Pollen
(3)	Daniel Pollen		15 July 1873	16 October 1877	Vogel II
(3)	Daniel Pollen		15 July 1873	16 October 1877	Atkinson I, II
12	George Stoddart Whitmore		16 October 1877	8 October 1879	Grey
(1)	Frederick Whitaker		8 October 1879	4 June 1884	Hall
(1)	Frederick Whitaker		8 October 1879	4 June 1884	Whitaker II
(1)	Frederick Whitaker		8 October 1879	4 June 1884	Atkinson III
13	Richard Oliver		4 June 1884	19 August 1884	Atkinson III
(12)	George Stoddart Whitmore		19 August 1884	29 August 1884	Stout–Vogel
14	George McLean		29 August 1884	4 September 1884	Atkinson IV
15	Patrick Buckley		4 September 1884	11 October 1887	Stout–Vogel
(1)	Frederick Whitaker		11 October 1887	27 January 1891	Atkinson V
(15)	Patrick Buckley		27 January 1891	11 June 1896	Liberal
16	William Campbell Walker		11 June 1896	29 June 1903	Liberal
17	Albert Pitt		29 June 1903	27 June 1907	Liberal
18	John Findlay		27 June 1907	1 August 1911	Liberal
19	James McGowan		1 August 1911	29 August 1911	Liberal
(18)	John Findlay		29 August 1911	16 February 1912	Liberal
(19)	James McGowan		16 February 1912	27 June 1912	Liberal
20	Oliver Samuel		27 June 1912	10 July 1912	Liberal
21	Francis Bell		10 July 1912	17 June 1926	Reform
22	Heaton Rhodes		17 June 1926	June 1927	Reform
(21)	Francis Bell		June 1927	10 December 1928	Reform
23	Thomas Sidey		10 December 1928	2 October 1931	United
23	Thomas Sidey		10 December 1928	2 October 1931	United–Reform
24	Robert Masters		2 October 1931	15 October 1931	United–Reform
25	James Parr		15 October 1931	5 December 1933	United–Reform
(24)	Robert Masters		5 December 1933	25 March 1936	United–Reform
26	Mark Fagan		25 March 1936	17 September 1939	First Labour
27	David Wilson		17 September 1939	26 September 1944	First Labour
28	Angus McLagan		26 September 1944	25 June 1947	First Labour
(27)	David Wilson		25 June 1947	27 June 1950	First Labour
29	William Polson		27 June 1950	31 December 1950	First National

== See also ==
- New Zealand Legislative Council
- Leader of the House (equivalent in the House of Representatives)
