= Beatrice Seddon =

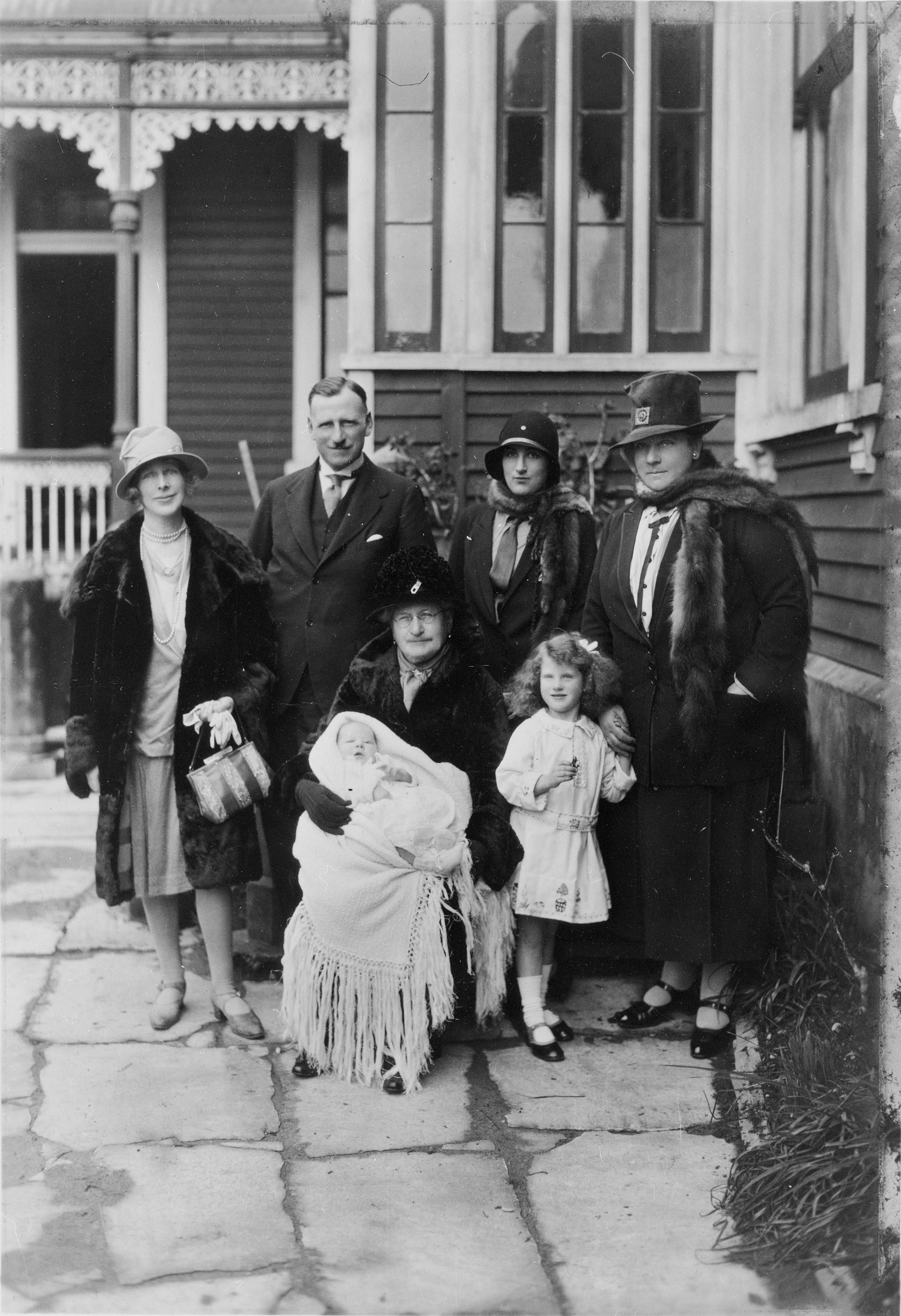
Beatrice (left) and Tom Seddon with members of their family. Taken circa 1929.

Beatrice Ann Seddon (née Wood; 1889–1987) was a New Zealand artist. Her works are held in the collection of the Museum of New Zealand Te Papa Tongarewa.

== Early life ==
Seddon was born in 1889 in Christchurch, New Zealand, to William Wood and Mary Theresa Wood.

== Education ==
Seddon was educated at Rangi Ruru Girls' School, attended a finishing school in England, and then returned to Christchurch to attend art school under the tutelage of Sydney Thompson and Margaret Stoddart. During World War I Seddon served as a volunteer ambulance driver at Codford on Salisbury Plain, and this role included caring for recuperating officers. After contracting measles at Codford, Seddon went on holiday to St Ives, Cornwall where she met and befriended New Zealand artist Frances Hodgkins, and while in St Ives, Hodgkins painted a portrait of Seddon (commissioned by her), titled Portrait of Miss Beatrice Wood, 1918.

== Career ==
Seddon painted and exhibited throughout her lifetime, with many of her works inspired by her garden. She had lessons with Frances Hodgkins in London from ca 1914–1919.

== Family life ==
On 15 March 1922 she married Tom Seddon, son of former New Zealand Prime Minister Richard Seddon, at St Mary's in Merivale. The service was performed by Canon W. S. Bean, the groom's brother-in-law, assisted by Archdeacon Haggitt. They had three children – Mary Dorothea Seddon, Richard and Derry. Mary was born in 1924 and went on to own the Monde Marie coffee bar in Wellington, well known for its folk music.

Seddon died in Wellington in 1987.
