= Westland (New Zealand electorate) =

Westland was a parliamentary electorate in the West Coast of New Zealand from 1866 to 1868 and 1890 to 1972. In 1972 the Tasman and West Coast electorates replaced the former Buller and Westland electorates.

== Population centres ==
In the 1865 electoral redistribution, the House of Representatives focussed its review of electorates to South Island electorates only, as the Otago gold rush had caused significant population growth, and a redistribution of the existing population. Fifteen additional South Island electorates were created, including Westland, and the number of Members of Parliament was increased by 13 to 70.

In December 1887, the House of Representatives voted to reduce its membership from general electorates from 91 to 70. The 1890 electoral redistribution used the same 1886 census data used for the 1887 electoral redistribution. In addition, three-member electorates were introduced in the four main centres. This resulted in a major restructuring of electorates, and Westland was one of eight electorates to be re-created for the 1890 election.

== History ==
The electorate was formed for the 1866 election. William Sefton Moorhouse stood in the electorate and was returned 16 March 1866 in favour of William Shaw.

The general election was held on 22 February 1866 in the Mount Herbert electorate, in which Moorhouse was returned unopposed. Having been elected in two electorates, Moorhouse chose to represent Westland. Moorhouse resigned on 20 February 1868.

Joseph Grimmond, who had since 1887 represented the Hokitika electorate, contested the Westland electorate in the 1890 general election against Richard Seddon, with Seddon being successful. In the 1893 election, Seddon was returned unopposed. In the 1896 election, Seddon was again opposed by Grimmond but remained successful. Seddon held the electorate until his death in 1906. He was succeeded by his son Tom, who in turn represented the electorate until his defeat in the 1925 election by Labour's James O'Brien.

=== Members of Parliament ===
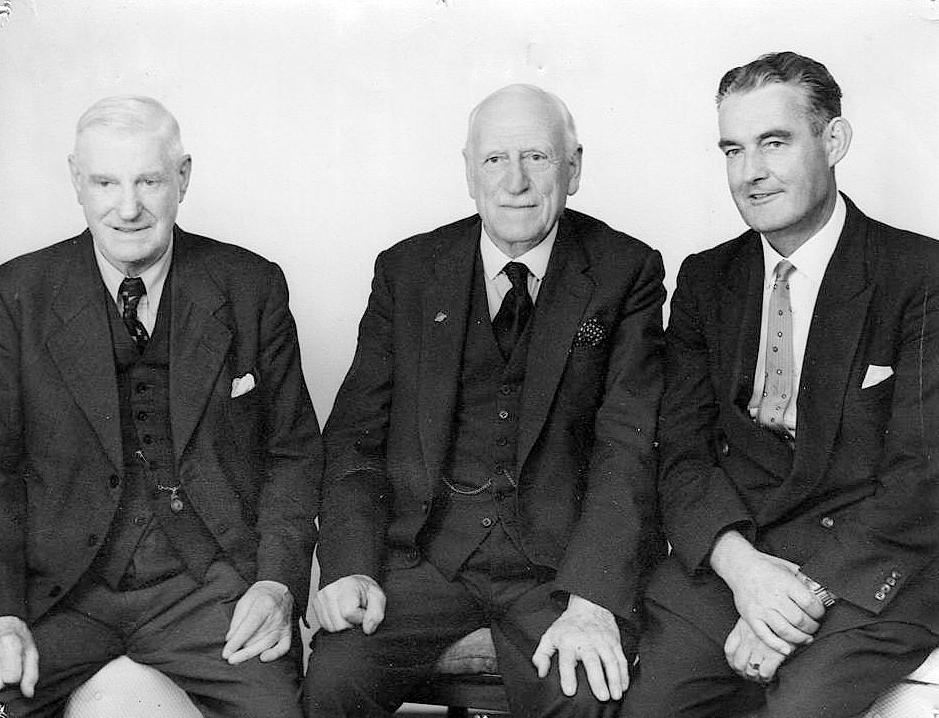
Three Westland Members of Parliament (L to R) Jim Kent, Tom Seddon and Paddy Blanchfield

The electorate was represented by seven Members of Parliament:

Key

Independent Liberal Labour

Election	Winner
1866 election	William Sefton Moorhouse
(Electorate abolished 1868–1890, see Westland South, Westland North, Waimea, and Westland Boroughs)
1890 election	Richard Seddon
1893 election	Richard Seddon
1896 election	Richard Seddon
1899 election	Richard Seddon
1902 election	Richard Seddon
1905 election	Richard Seddon
1906 by-election	Tom Seddon
1908 election	Tom Seddon
1911 election	Tom Seddon
1914 election	Tom Seddon
1919 election	Tom Seddon
1922 election	James O'Brien
1925 election	Tom Seddon (2nd period)
1928 election	James O'Brien (2nd period)
1931 election	James O'Brien (2nd period)
1935 election	James O'Brien (2nd period)
1938 election	James O'Brien (2nd period)
1943 election	James O'Brien (2nd period)
1946 election	James O'Brien (2nd period)
1947 by-election	Jim Kent
1949 election	Jim Kent
1951 election	Jim Kent
1954 election	Jim Kent
1957 election	Jim Kent
1960 election	Paddy Blanchfield
1963 election	Paddy Blanchfield
1966 election	Paddy Blanchfield
1969 election	Paddy Blanchfield
(Electorate abolished in 1972, see West Coast and Tasman)

== Election results ==
=== 1969 election ===
1969 general election: Westland
Party	Candidate	Votes	%	±%
Labour	Paddy Blanchfield	6,449	44.30	−12.01
Independent	Barry Dallas	4,570	31.39	
National	George Ferguson	2,548	17.50	−8.95
Social Credit	Ian Fraser	988	6.78	−9.43
Majority		1,879	12.90	−16.96
Turnout		14,555	90.91	+1.52
Registered electors		16,010		

=== 1966 election ===
1966 general election: Westland
Party	Candidate	Votes	%	±%
Labour	Paddy Blanchfield	7,621	56.31	−4.48
National	George Ferguson	3,580	26.45	
Social Credit	Ian Fraser	2,194	16.21	+4.44
Communist	Robert Henry Mitchell	138	1.01	−0.14
Majority		4,041	29.86	−4.66
Turnout		13,533	89.39	−1.91
Registered electors		15,138		

=== 1963 election ===
1963 general election: Westland
Party	Candidate	Votes	%	±%
Labour	Paddy Blanchfield	8,672	60.79	+1.91
National	Winston Reynolds	3,747	26.26	
Social Credit	Ian Fraser	1,680	11.77	+3.29
Communist	Robert Henry Mitchell	165	1.15	−0.35
Majority		4,925	34.52	+6.76
Turnout		14,264	91.30	−0.72
Registered electors		15,622		

=== 1960 election ===
1960 general election: Westland
Party	Candidate	Votes	%	±%
Labour	Paddy Blanchfield	8,153	58.88	
National	D A Hogg	4,309	31.12	
Social Credit	Ian Fraser	1,175	8.48	+3.03
Communist	Robert Henry Mitchell	208	1.50	
Majority		3,844	27.76	
Turnout		13,845	92.02	−1.19
Registered electors		15,045		

=== 1957 election ===
1957 general election: Westland
Party	Candidate	Votes	%	±%
Labour	Jim Kent	9,159	63.22	+4.00
National	Fred Boustridge	4,414	30.46	
Social Credit	Ian Fraser	790	5.45	−1.26
Communist	Donald McEwan	124	0.85	
Majority		4,725	32.61	+6.43
Turnout		14,487	93.21	+0.45
Registered electors		15,542		

=== 1954 election ===
1954 general election: Westland
Party	Candidate	Votes	%	±%
Labour	Jim Kent	8,152	59.22	+0.48
Independent	Mark Wallace	4,547	33.03	
Social Credit	Ian Fraser	925	6.71	
Communist	Robert Henry Mitchell	141	1.02	
Majority		3,605	26.18	+8.69
Turnout		13,765	92.76	−4.70
Registered electors		14,839		

=== 1951 election ===
1951 general election: Westland
Party	Candidate	Votes	%	±%
Labour	Jim Kent	7,806	58.74	−0.09
National	Isabella Catherine Brown	5,481	41.25	
Majority		2,325	17.49	−2.65
Turnout		13,287	88.06	−5.17
Registered electors		15,087		

=== 1949 election ===
1949 general election: Westland
Party	Candidate	Votes	%	±%
Labour	Jim Kent	8,013	58.83	+0.19
National	Patrick Joseph O'Regan	5,269	38.68	
Communist	Robert Henry Mitchell	338	2.48	
Majority		2,744	20.14	+2.65
Turnout		13,620	93.23	+2.88
Registered electors		14,608		

=== 1947 by-election ===
1947 Westland by-election
Party	Candidate	Votes	%	±%
Labour	Jim Kent	7,427	57.64	
National	Jack Lockington	5,405	41.95	
Informal votes		54	0.41	−0.01
Majority		2,022	15.76	
Turnout		12,886	90.35	−4.10
Registered electors		14,262		
Labour hold		Swing		

=== 1946 election ===
1946 general election: Westland
Party	Candidate	Votes	%	±%
Labour	James O'Brien	9,097	67.21	
National	Frank Chivers	4,381	32.36	
Informal votes		57	0.42	
Majority		4,716	34.99	
Turnout		13,535	94.45	
Registered electors		14,330		

=== 1931 election ===
1931 general election: Westland
Party	Candidate	Votes	%	±%
Labour	James O'Brien	5,193	56.05	+5.02
Independent	John Greenslade	4,072	43.95	
Majority		1,121	12.10	+10.04
Informal votes		63	0.68	−0.38
Turnout		9,328	91.21	−2.54
Registered electors		10,227		

=== 1928 election ===
1928 general election: Westland
Party	Candidate	Votes	%	±%
Labour	James O'Brien	4,576	51.03	+1.92
United	Tom Seddon	4,391	48.97	−0.28
Informal votes		96	1.06	−0.56
Majority		185	2.06	
Turnout		9,063	93.75	−0.86
Registered electors		9,667		

=== 1925 election ===
1925 general election: Westland
Party	Candidate	Votes	%	±%
Liberal	Tom Seddon	4,175	49.25	+18.48
Labour	James O'Brien	4,163	49.11	+12.19
Informal votes		138	1.62	+0.97
Majority		12	0.14	
Turnout		8,476	94.61	+1.87
Registered electors		8,958		

=== 1922 election ===
1922 general election: Westland
Party	Candidate	Votes	%	±%
Labour	James O'Brien	2,926	36.92	−1.77
Liberal	Tom Seddon	2,439	30.77	−29.33
Reform	Jesse Steer	1,952	24.63	
Independent	James Daniel Lynch	556	7.01	
Informal votes		52	0.65	−0.56
Majority		487	6.14	
Turnout		7,925	92.74	+8.64
Registered electors		8,545		

=== 1919 election ===
1919 general election: Westland
Party	Candidate	Votes	%	±%
Liberal	Tom Seddon	4,201	60.10	
Labour	James O'Brien	2,704	38.69	
Informal votes		85	1.21	
Majority		1,497	21.41	
Turnout		6,990	84.10	
Registered electors		8,311		

=== 1906 by-election ===
1906 Westland by-election
Party	Candidate	Votes	%	±%
Liberal	Tom Seddon	2,403	58.81	
Conservative	Henry Michel	1,683	41.18	
Majority		720	17.62	
Turnout		4,086	91.12	+10.05
Registered electors		4,484		

=== 1905 election ===
1905 general election: Westland
Party	Candidate	Votes	%	±%
Liberal	Richard Seddon	3,420	92.05	−0.58
Independent	Harry Cowin	240	6.46	
Informal votes		55	1.48	
Majority		3,180	85.59	+0.32
Turnout		3,715	81.07	+11.20
Registered electors		4,582		

=== 1902 election ===
1902 general election: Westland
Party	Candidate	Votes	%	±%
Liberal	Richard Seddon	2,983	92.63	
Independent	Frank Isitt	237	7.36	
Majority		2,746	85.27	
Turnout		3,220	69.87	
Registered electors		4,608		

=== 1899 election ===
1899 general election: Westland
Party	Candidate	Votes	%	±%
Liberal	Richard Seddon	Unopposed		
Registered electors		4,427		

=== 1896 election ===
1896 general election: Westland
Party	Candidate	Votes	%	±%
Liberal	Richard Seddon	2,707	76.66	
Conservative	Joseph Grimmond	824	23.34	
Majority		1,883	53.33	
Informal votes				
Turnout				
Registered electors		4,508		

=== 1893 election ===
1893 general election: Westland
Party	Candidate	Votes	%	±%
Liberal	Richard Seddon	Unopposed		
Registered electors		4,186		

=== 1890 election ===
1890 general election: Westland
Party	Candidate	Votes	%	±%
Liberal	Richard Seddon	1,098	59.10	
Conservative	Joseph Grimmond	760	40.90	
Majority		338	18.19	
Turnout		1,858	73.06	
Registered electors		2,543		

=== 1866 election ===
1866 general election: Westland
Party	Candidate	Votes	%	±%
Independent	William Sefton Moorhouse	202	55.49	
Independent	William Shaw	162	44.51	
Majority		40	10.99	
Turnout		364		
Registered electors				
