= Paddy Blanchfield =

New Zealand politician

Paddy Blanchfield MBE JP
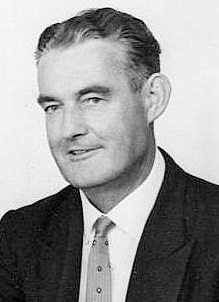

Member of the New Zealand Parliament for West Coast Westland (1960–1972)
- In office 26 November 1960 – 25 November 1978
- Preceded by: Jim Kent
- Succeeded by: Kerry Burke

Personal details
- Born: 18 December 1911 Greymouth, New Zealand
- Died: 20 June 1980 (aged 68) Greymouth, New Zealand
- Party: Labour
- Spouse: Anne Blanchfield
- Children: 11

Patrick Blanchfield MBE JP (18 December 1911 – 20 June 1980) was a Labour Party member of the New Zealand Parliament for Westland and the West Coast.

== Biography ==
=== Early life and career ===
Blanchfield was born in 1911 in Greymouth where his father, Patrick, owned a bakery. He was educated at Marist Brothers' Primary School where he won the Seddon Medal for being the school districts top scholar. He received secondary schooling at St Bede's College, Christchurch. Despite receiving a formal education Blanchfield still stuck to the "self-taught tradition" of other West Coasters and educated himself further on his favourite subjects, those of literature and poetry. He was also to compose his own poetry which were compiled in the 1971 book The Ballads of a Coaster.

In 1938 he married Anne Jane Glen Faulkner. He joined his father in the baking business and remained attached to the business until his election to Parliament, where his son took over the shop.

He had a lifetime interest in Harness racing. He owned his own horse at one stage, One Stately Lady, though it only won a race once. The horse did become the subject of one Blanchfield's most notable poems. Blanchfield was also a commentator on the West Coast racing circuit for many years.

=== Political career ===
New Zealand Parliament
Years	Term	Electorate	Party
1960–1963	33rd	Westland	Labour
1963–1966	34th	Westland	Labour
1966–1969	35th	Westland	Labour
1969–1972	36th	Westland	Labour
1972–1975	37th	West Coast	Labour
1975–1978	38th	West Coast	Labour

Blanchfield was elected as a member of the Greymouth Borough Council via a by-election in 1937, aged only 21. He remained a member of the council until 1941 when he unsuccessfully stood for the mayoralty. That same year however he was successful in winning a seat on the Grey Power Board. He was a member of the Power Board for 21 years, including two as chairman. In 1947 he put himself forward as a candidate for the Labour Party nomination for the Westland electorate at a by-election. Though he was unsuccessful with Jim Kent ultimately being selected. In 1953 he returned to the Borough Council "topping the poll" and was a member until 1962 when he chose not to stand for re-election. Additionally, he was a member of the Westland catchment Board from 1968 to 1971.

In 1960 Kent retired from parliament and Blanchfield succeeded him, representing the Westland electorate from 1960 to 1972, and then the West Coast electorate from 1972 to 1978, when he retired. He had health problems during this time and in 1967 had a lung removed. In 1977 he was hospitalized for some time under an Oxygen tent. Both incidents induced Blanchfield to retire at the 1978 general election.

He was famous for his elaborate style of oration and habit of quoting his favourite authors (including William Shakespeare, Robbie Burns, John Milton and Thomas Gray) in speeches to Parliament. The most well known occasion was whilst debating an education bill when he quoted a long passage from Elegy Written in a Country Churchyard, to which the Speaker Sir Ronald Algie asked what was the purpose of the quote. Blanchfield responded that "What is happening is exactly the same as in Gray's time when the poor could not get an education". Algie's face slumped into his hands, however he allowed Blanchfield to continue.

In 1977, Blanchfield was awarded the Queen Elizabeth II Silver Jubilee Medal. In the 1978 Queen's Birthday Honours, he was appointed a Member of the Order of the British Empire, for services to the community.

=== Later life and death ===
Upon retiring from politics Blanchfield became the patron of West Coast Rugby League.

He had been suffering from a lung ailment and respiratory disease for several years prior. Before his death he had voluntarily spent a month in hospital, where he spent his time writing copious notes in preparation for writing a memoir, before being discharged. A week later he was readmitted. Blanchfield died in Greymouth on 20 June 1980, aged 68. He was survived by his wife, four sons and seven daughters.

== Notes ==
New Zealand Parliament
Preceded by Jim Kent	Member of Parliament for Westland; 1960–1972	Constituency abolished
New constituency	Member of Parliament for West Coast; 1972–1978	Succeeded by Kerry Burke
