= James O'Brien (New Zealand politician) =

New Zealand politician

The Honourable James O'Brien
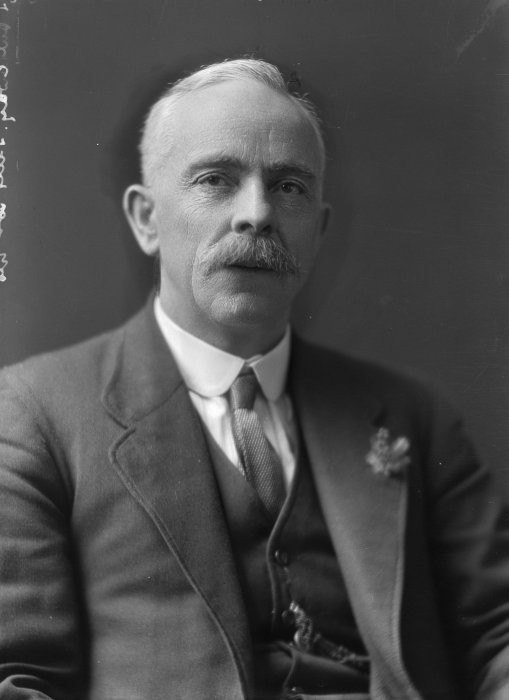

5th Minister of Transport
- In office 9 December 1942 – 28 September 1947
- Prime Minister: Peter Fraser
- Preceded by: Bob Semple
- Succeeded by: Fred Hackett

Member of the New Zealand Parliament for Westland
- In office 7 December 1922 – 4 November 1925
- Preceded by: Tom Seddon
- Succeeded by: Tom Seddon
- In office 14 November 1928 – 28 September 1947
- Preceded by: Tom Seddon
- Succeeded by: Jim Kent

Personal details
- Born: Peter James O'Brien; 8 June 1874 Forest Creek, Victoria, Australia
- Died: 28 September 1947 (aged 73) Wellington, New Zealand
- Party: Labour
- Spouse: Kate Teresa Flaherty (m. 1909)

Peter James O'Brien (8 June 1874 – 28 September 1947) was a New Zealand politician of the Labour Party.

== Early life ==
O'Brien was born in 1874 at Forest Creek, near Castlemaine, Victoria, Australia. His parents of Irish descent were Terence O’Brien, a miner, and Bridget O’Leary. He was christened Peter James, but his first name was never used; many knew him as Jim or Briney. After having worked as a miner in various Australian states, O'Brien emigrated to New Zealand in 1904 and found employment as a coalminer in Reefton. O'Brien became active in the socialist circles that developed on the West Coast. He became president of the Westland Certificated Engine-drivers' and Firemen's Union, and was the president of the Runanga Co-operative Society.

== Political career ==
New Zealand Parliament
Years	Term	Electorate	Party
1922–1925	21st	Westland	Labour
1928–1931	23rd	Westland	Labour
1931–1935	24th	Westland	Labour
1935–1938	25th	Westland	Labour
1938–1943	26th	Westland	Labour
1943–1946	27th	Westland	Labour
1946–1947	28th	Westland	Labour

Standing on a socialist ticket, he was voted onto the inaugural Runanga Borough Council in 1912. In 1913, he supported Paddy Webb's successful by-election campaign in the Grey electorate for the Social Democratic Party, and later became the president of the Runanga branch of the party. He was a member of the Greymouth Borough Council for eight years and he was deputy mayor for three of them. He was also a member of the Grey Power Board. O'Brien was twice president of the Grey branch of the Labour Party and helped to establish the Grey River Argus as a Labour daily newspaper.

He represented the Westland electorate in Parliament from the 1922 election, when he defeated Tom Seddon. He lost the electorate in the 1925 election to Tom Seddon, but won it back in 1928, and held it to 1947, when he died. He was the senior Government whip from 1939 until his promotion to the cabinet in 1942.

He was a Minister in the First Labour Government. He was Minister of Transport (9 December 1942 – 28 September 1947), Minister of Marine (9 December 1942 – 28 September 1947), Minister of Labour (27 June 1946 – 19 December 1946) and Minister of Mines (27 June 1946 – 19 December 1946). He remained an MP until his death, which caused a by-election held in December 1947 that was won by Labour's Jim Kent.

In 1935, he was awarded the King George V Silver Jubilee Medal.

== Family and death ==
O'Brien married Kate Teresa Flaherty on 29 June 1909 in Greymouth. He died in Wellington on 28 September 1947. His wife survived him; they had no children.

== Notes ==
Political offices
Preceded by Bob Semple	Minister of Transport; 1942–1947	Succeeded by Fred Hackett
Preceded by Paddy Webb	Minister of Labour; 1946	Succeeded by Angus McLagan
New Zealand Parliament
Preceded by Tom Seddon	Member of Parliament for Westland; 1922–1925 1928–1947	Succeeded by Tom Seddon
Preceded by Tom Seddon	Member of Parliament for Westland; 1922–1925 1928–1947	Succeeded by Jim Kent
Party political offices
Preceded by Robert McKeen	Senior Whip of the Labour Party; 1939–1942	Succeeded by Arthur Shapton Richards
