= David Wilson (New Zealand Labour Party politician) =

New Zealand politician (1880–1977)

The Honourable David Wilson
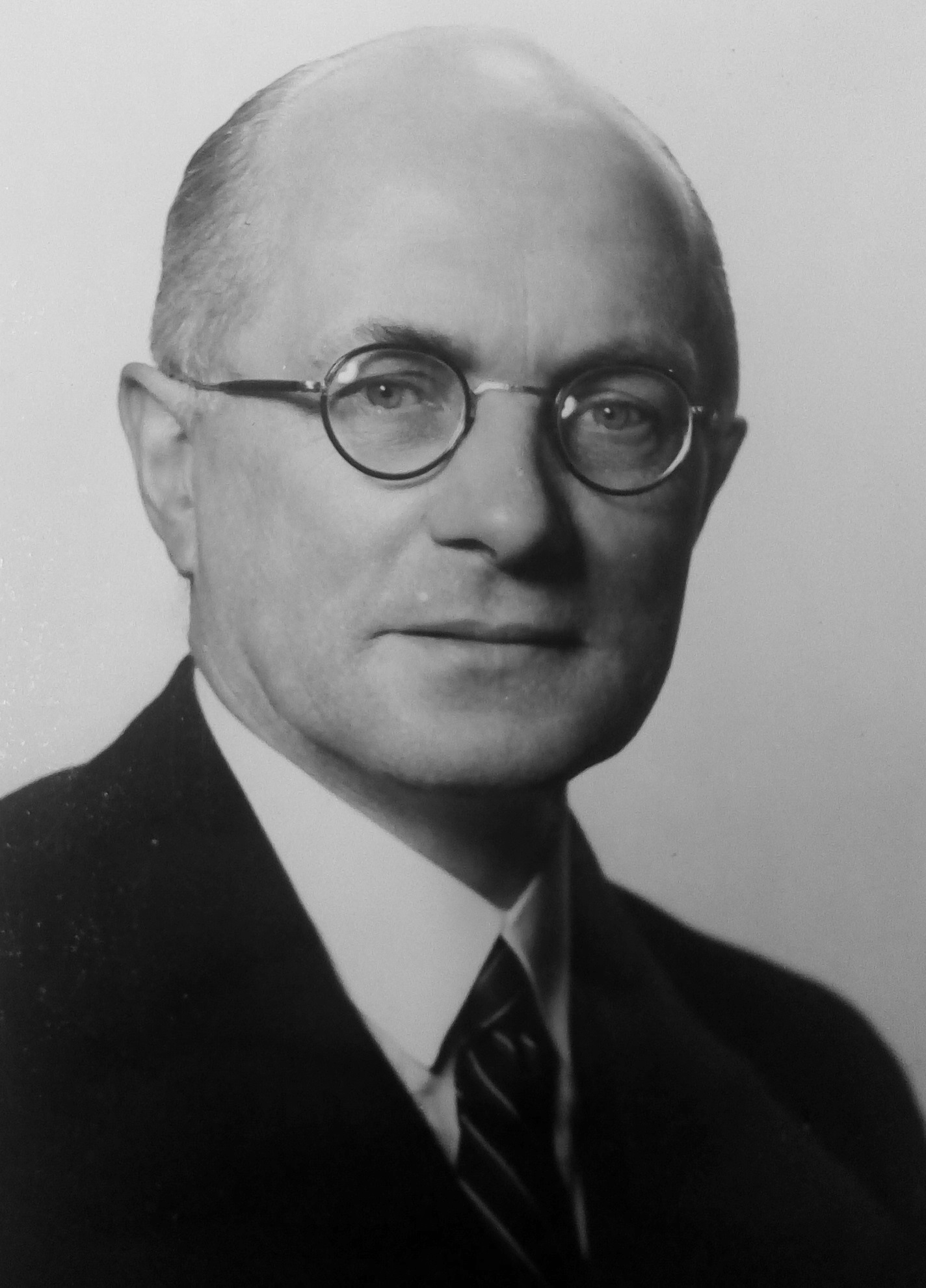

27th Leader of the Legislative Council
- In office 17 September 1939 – 26 September 1944
- Prime Minister: Michael Joseph Savage; Peter Fraser
- Preceded by: Mark Fagan
- Succeeded by: Angus McLagan
- In office 25 June 1947 – 27 June 1950
- Prime Minister: Peter Fraser
- Preceded by: Angus McLagan
- Succeeded by: William Polson

28th Minister of Immigration
- In office 30 April 1940 – 12 April 1944
- Prime Minister: Peter Fraser
- Preceded by: Tim Armstrong
- Succeeded by: Paddy Webb

3rd Minister of Broadcasting
- In office 21 January 1941 – 8 April 1944
- Prime Minister: Peter Fraser
- Preceded by: Peter Fraser
- Succeeded by: Fred Jones

Personal details
- Born: 6 July 1880 Glasgow, Scotland
- Died: 24 August 1977 (aged 97) Wellington, New Zealand
- Party: Labour

David Wilson (6 July 1880 – 24 August 1977) was a New Zealand politician of the Labour Party. Through membership of the Legislative Council, he was a minister in the First Labour Government.

== Biography ==
=== Early life and career ===
He was born in Glasgow, Scotland, a tailor, and was a union organiser in Derbyshire, England, before migrating to Australia in 1911. He set up his own tailoring store but went out of business in 1915 following a fall in demand due to men serving overseas. In 1916 he moved to New Zealand with his wife and two children where he found work in first Nelson then Auckland as a designer and cutter at several tailoring firms. In 1926 he became a paid Labour Party organiser and secretary of the Auckland Labour Representation Committee (LRC), and assistant to Walter Nash then Jim Thorn. Wilson unsuccessfully stood for the Auckland City Council on a Labour ticket in the 1921 local elections. In 1935 he was campaign manager to Labour leader Michael Joseph Savage in Auckland West.

Wilson served as the Labour Party's Secretary-Treasurer from 1936 until 1940. Wilson wrote a well publicised pamphlet on progress made by the government in its first year. Titled History in the Making it was published in London by the New Fabian Research Bureau. In 1938 he was overall campaign manager for Labour's election campaign where Labour boosted their vote percentage by 10 percentage points.

=== Political career ===
He was a member of the New Zealand Legislative Council from 22 September 1937 to 21 September 1944, when his term ended; and 16 June 1947 to 31 December 1950, when the Council was abolished. He was a Member of the Executive Council in the First Labour Government. He was elected in a caucus ballot after the size of the cabinet was increased by one seat narrowly ahead of Gervan McMillan 19 votes to 18. He was Minister without Portfolio from 8 November 1939 to 13 December 1949; Minister of Immigration and Minister for State Fire Insurance from 30 April 1940 to 12 April 1944; Minister of Civil Defence from 30 October 1942 to 12 April 1944; Minister of Broadcasting and Associate Minister of National Service from 21 January 1941 to 12 April 1944. Later Labour leader Bill Rowling, whose father was a personal friend of Wilson, said that while not being in the public eye as much as many of his contemporaries Wilson's contribution to the Labour Party and government policy from 1935 to 1949 were just as substantial.

=== Diplomatic career ===
He was High Commissioner to Canada and New Zealand delegate to the UN General Assembly 1944–47, and to FAO 1945, UNESCO and UNICEF 1946–47.

=== Later life and death ===
Drawing on his experiences he authored two books History in the Making and Preferential Voting System Explained. He was also an enthusiast for soccer, theatre and travelling.

A 91-year old Wilson was a guest of honour at the first meeting of caucus following Labour's victory in the 1972 election and oversaw the election of the cabinet for the Third Labour Government.

He died in Wellington Hospital on 24 August 1977. He was survived by his daughter, his wife and son had predeceased him.

== Notes ==
Government offices
Preceded by Mark Fagan	Leader of the Legislative Council; 1939–1944 1947–1950	Succeeded by Angus McLagan
Preceded by Angus McLagan	Leader of the Legislative Council; 1939–1944 1947–1950	Succeeded by William Polson
Political offices
Preceded by Tim Armstrong	Minister of Immigration; 1940–1944	Succeeded by Paddy Webb
Preceded by Peter Fraser	Minister of Broadcasting; 1941–1944	Succeeded by Fred Jones
Diplomatic posts
Preceded by Robert M. Firth	New Zealand High Commissioner to Canada; 1944–1947	Succeeded by Jim Thorn
Party political offices
Preceded by Jim Thorn	Secretary of the Labour Party; 1936–1940	Succeeded by Mick Moohan
