= Minister of Immigration (New Zealand) =

New Zealand minister of the Crown

Minister of Immigration of New Zealand
- Coat of arms of New Zealand

- Flag of New Zealand

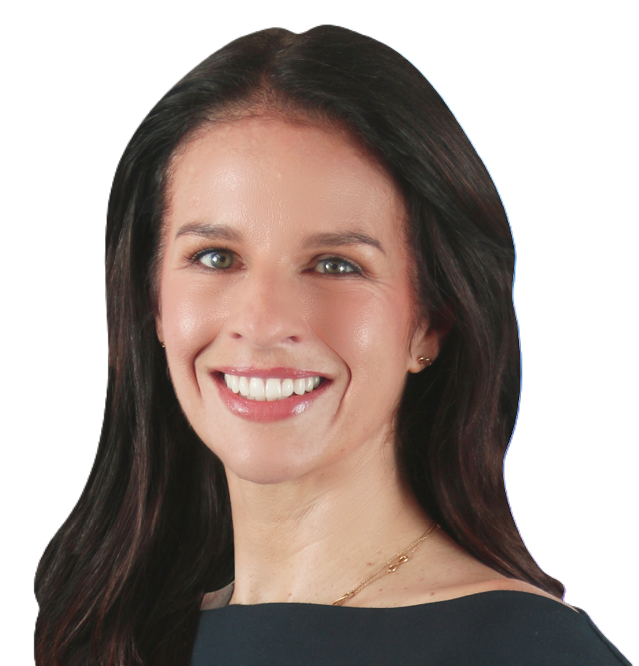
- Incumbent; Erica Stanford since 27 November 2023
- Immigration New Zealand
- Style: The Honourable
- Member of: Cabinet of New Zealand; Executive Council
- Reports to: Prime Minister of New Zealand
- Appointer: Governor-General of New Zealand
- Term length: At His Majesty's pleasure
- Formation: 10 September 1872
- First holder: William Fitzherbert
- Salary: $288,900
- Website: www.beehive.govt.nz

The minister of immigration is a minister in the New Zealand Government. The portfolio was established in 1872 as the secretary for Crown lands and immigration. The minister appointed was William Fitzherbert but when replaced later in the year by Maurice O'Rorke, the title was changed to Minister of Immigration.

== Functions and responsibilities ==
The Minister of Immigration is responsible for leading the policy and strategic direction of the New Zealand immigration system and setting the rules and criteria for the granting of visas and entry permission, and making decisions in individual cases. The Minister of Immigration receives operational support from Immigration New Zealand, which is part of the Ministry of Business, Innovation and Employment (MBIE). MBIE's Immigration Policy Team advises the Minister on policy matters. The Immigration Minister also has jurisdiction over both the Immigration Advisers Authority, which provides licenses to service people who provide immigration advice to prospective immigrants, and the Immigration Advisers Complaints and Disciplinary Tribunal. The Minister of Immigration is regulated by the Immigration Act 2009 and the Immigration Advisers Licensing Act.

== List of ministers ==
The following ministers have held the office of Minister of Immigration.

Key

Independent Liberal Reform United Labour National NZ First

No.	Name	Portrait	Term of office		Prime Minister
1	William Fitzherbert		10 September 1872	11 October 1872	Stafford
2	Maurice O'Rorke		24 October 1872	11 October 1873	Waterhouse
2	Maurice O'Rorke		24 October 1872	11 October 1873	Fox
2	Maurice O'Rorke		24 October 1872	11 October 1873	Vogel
3	Julius Vogel		11 October 1873	10 September 1874	Vogel
4	Harry Atkinson		10 September 1874	1 September 1876	Vogel
4	Harry Atkinson		10 September 1874	1 September 1876	Pollen
4	Harry Atkinson		10 September 1874	1 September 1876	Vogel
5	John Davies Ormond		1 September 1876	13 September 1876	Atkinson
(5)	Harry Atkinson		13 September 1876	4 January 1877	Atkinson
6	Donald Reid		4 January 1877	13 October 1877	Atkinson
7	James Macandrew		15 October 1877	25 July 1878	Grey
8	Robert Stout		25 July 1878	25 June 1879	Grey
9	William Gisborne		25 June 1879	8 October 1879	Grey
10	William Rolleston		8 October 1879	16 August 1884	Hall
10	William Rolleston		8 October 1879	16 August 1884	Whitaker
10	William Rolleston		8 October 1879	16 August 1884	Atkinson
(7)	James Macandrew		16 August 1884	28 August 1884	Stout
11	Richmond Hursthouse		28 August 1884	3 September 1884	Atkinson
12	John Ballance		3 September 1884	8 October 1887	Stout
13	George Richardson		8 October 1887	24 January 1891	Atkinson
14	John McKenzie		24 January 1891	2 March 1896	Ballance
14	John McKenzie		24 January 1891	2 March 1896	Seddon
15	William Campbell Walker		2 March 1896	20 June 1903	Seddon
16	Richard Seddon		22 June 1903	10 June 1906	Seddon
17	Charlie Mills		10 June 1906	6 August 1906	Hall-Jones
18	James McGowan		6 August 1906	6 January 1909	Ward
19	George Fowlds		6 January 1909	4 September 1911	Ward
20	George Warren Russell		28 March 1912	10 July 1912	Mackenzie
21	Francis Bell		13 July 1912	12 August 1915	Massey
22	Josiah Hanan		12 August 1915	16 August 1915	Massey
(21)	Francis Bell		16 August 1915	14 May 1920	Massey
23	William Nosworthy		14 May 1920	10 December 1928	Massey
23	William Nosworthy		14 May 1920	10 December 1928	Bell
23	William Nosworthy		14 May 1920	10 December 1928	Coates
24	John Cobbe		10 December 1928	28 May 1930	Ward
25	Sydney George Smith		28 May 1930	22 September 1931	Forbes
26	Alexander Young		22 September 1931	6 December 1935	Forbes
27	Tim Armstrong		6 December 1935	30 April 1940	Savage
27	Tim Armstrong		6 December 1935	30 April 1940	Fraser
28	David Wilson		30 April 1940	12 April 1944	Fraser
29	Paddy Webb		12 April 1944	19 December 1946	Fraser
30	Angus McLagan		19 December 1946	13 December 1949	Fraser
31	Bill Sullivan		13 December 1949	26 November 1954	Holland
32	Ralph Hanan		26 November 1954	20 December 1957	Holland
32	Ralph Hanan		26 November 1954	20 December 1957	Holyoake
33	Fred Hackett		12 December 1957	12 December 1960	Nash
34	Tom Shand		12 December 1960	22 December 1969	Holyoake
35	Jack Marshall		22 December 1969	9 February 1972	Holyoake
36	David Thomson		9 February 1972	8 December 1972	Marshall
37	Fraser Colman		8 December 1972	12 December 1975	Kirk
37	Fraser Colman		8 December 1972	12 December 1975	Rowling
38	Frank Gill		12 December 1975	13 December 1978	Muldoon
39	Jim Bolger		13 December 1978	12 February 1981	Muldoon
40	Aussie Malcolm		12 February 1981	26 July 1984	Muldoon
41	Kerry Burke		26 July 1984	24 August 1987	Lange
42	Stan Rodger		24 August 1987	14 August 1989	Lange
43	Roger Douglas		14 August 1989	9 February 1990	Lange
43	Roger Douglas		14 August 1989	9 February 1990	Palmer
44	Annette King		9 February 1990	2 November 1990	Palmer
44	Annette King		9 February 1990	2 November 1990	Moore
45	Bill Birch		2 November 1990	27 March 1993	Bolger
46	Maurice McTigue		27 March 1993	29 November 1993	Bolger
47	Roger Maxwell		29 November 1993	16 December 1996	Bolger
48	Tuariki Delamere		16 December 1996	24 November 1999	Bolger
48	Tuariki Delamere		16 December 1996	24 November 1999	Shipley
-	Wyatt Creech (acting)		24 November 1999	10 December 1999	Shipley
49	Lianne Dalziel		10 December 1999	21 February 2004	Clark
50	Paul Swain		21 February 2004	19 October 2005	Clark
51	David Cunliffe		19 October 2005	11 November 2007	Clark
52	Clayton Cosgrove		11 November 2007	19 November 2008	Clark
53	Jonathan Coleman		19 November 2008	14 December 2011	Key
54	Nathan Guy		14 December 2011	31 January 2013	Key
55	Michael Woodhouse		31 January 2013	26 October 2017	Key
55	Michael Woodhouse		31 January 2013	26 October 2017	English
56	Iain Lees-Galloway		26 October 2017	22 July 2020	Ardern
57	Kris Faafoi		22 July 2020	14 June 2022	Ardern
58	Michael Wood		14 June 2022	21 June 2023	Ardern
58	Michael Wood		14 June 2022	21 June 2023	Hipkins
59	Andrew Little		21 June 2023	27 November 2023	Hipkins
60	Erica Stanford		27 November 2023	present	Luxon
