= Jim Kent (politician) =

New Zealand politician

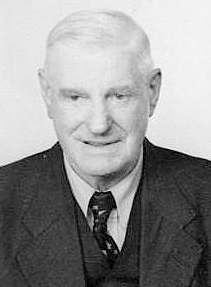

Member of the New Zealand Parliament for Westland
- In office 3 December 1947 – 26 November 1960
- Preceded by: James O'Brien
- Succeeded by: Paddy Blanchfield

Personal details
- Born: 1885 Dunoon, Argyll, Scotland
- Died: 4 November 1970 (aged 84–85) Greymouth, New Zealand
- Party: Labour
- Spouse: Jessie Ellen Pugh (m. 1934)
- Children: 3

James Begg Kent (1885 – 4 November 1970) was a New Zealand politician of the Labour Party. He served as a Member of Parliament and was both a borough councillor and deputy mayor of Greymouth.

== Biography ==
=== Early life and career ===
Kent was born in Dunoon, Argyll, Scotland, in 1885. There he studied as a sign writer at Dunoon Grammar School winning many awards before becoming a teacher at the same school. He then moved to London where he became the head sign writer for the London County Council works department. He became a member of the Independent Labour Party and served as a party organiser before being elected as a member of the Patrick Town Council.

Kent emigrated to New Zealand in 1909 and settled in Greymouth and established his own sign writer business. He then became secretary of the Grey Labour Paper Board which purchased the Grey River Argus in 1920 and was a director of the paper for 40 years. He then became a member of the Greymouth High School board of governors for 24 years from 1923 to 1947 and was chairman of its finance committee from 1941 to 1942.

In 1934, Kent married Jessie Ellen Pugh with whom he had three children. He was a member of the Westland Licensing Committee for 15 years and the Greymouth Civic Centre Board for two years. Kent was the inaugural president of the West Coast Athletic Council as well as a foundation executive member of the Greymouth Life-Saving and Surf Club, later serving 14 years as president and becoming a life member.

=== Political career ===
New Zealand Parliament
Years	Term	Electorate	Party
1947–1949	28th	Westland	Labour
1949–1951	29th	Westland	Labour
1951–1954	30th	Westland	Labour
1954–1957	31st	Westland	Labour
1957–1960	32nd	Westland	Labour

Kent became a founding member of the Social Democratic Party (SDP) and was the Greymouth branch delegate to the Grey District Workers' Council. When the SDP merged into the Labour Party Kent became president of the Westland Labour Representation Committee and later a member of the national executive of the party.

Kent was a Greymouth borough councillor from 1925 to 1947 and served twice as deputy mayor. On the council he was the chairman of both the library and traffic committees. In 1928 he was elected as a member of the Grey Electric Power Board and was the board's chairman for four terms. By extension he became a member of the national executive of the New Zealand Power Boards' Association.

In 1933, Kent was elected to the Grey Hospital Board and was chairman in 1942 and 1944. He was also a member of the Greymouth Harbour Board and he served as chairman between 1943 and 1946. Kent then became a member of the Greymouth Fire Board from 1944 to 1947.

In 1947, Kent put himself forward as a candidate for the Labour Party nomination for the Westland electorate at a by-election after the death of James O'Brien. Though he was unsuccessful with Robert James Ware ultimately being selected. Five days later however, Ware was taken ill suddenly on the same day he was due to open his campaign at a meeting in Ngahere. After receiving medical advice Ware withdrew his candidacy and Kent was selected as his replacement as the Labour candidate. He won the election and represented the West Coast electorate of Westland from 1947 to 1960, when he retired. Kent was a well read man and well versed in classical literature. Despite this he was not confident as an orator and seldom spoke for the full hour allotted to him in the house, a habit which earned him frequent heckling from National MPs.

In 1953, Kent was awarded the Queen Elizabeth II Coronation Medal.

=== Later life and death ===
Kent was elected as a member of the Grey County Catchment Board from 1965 to 1968. In 1966 he became president of the West Coast Composite Coal Committee for two years.

Kent died in Greymouth on 4 November 1970. He was survived by his two sons and a daughter, his wife having predeceased him by three years.

== Notes ==
New Zealand Parliament
Preceded by James O'Brien	Member of Parliament for Westland; 1947–1960	Succeeded by Paddy Blanchfield
