= 29th New Zealand Parliament =

Term of the Parliament of New Zealand

29th Parliament of New Zealand
←	28th Parliament	30th Parliament	→
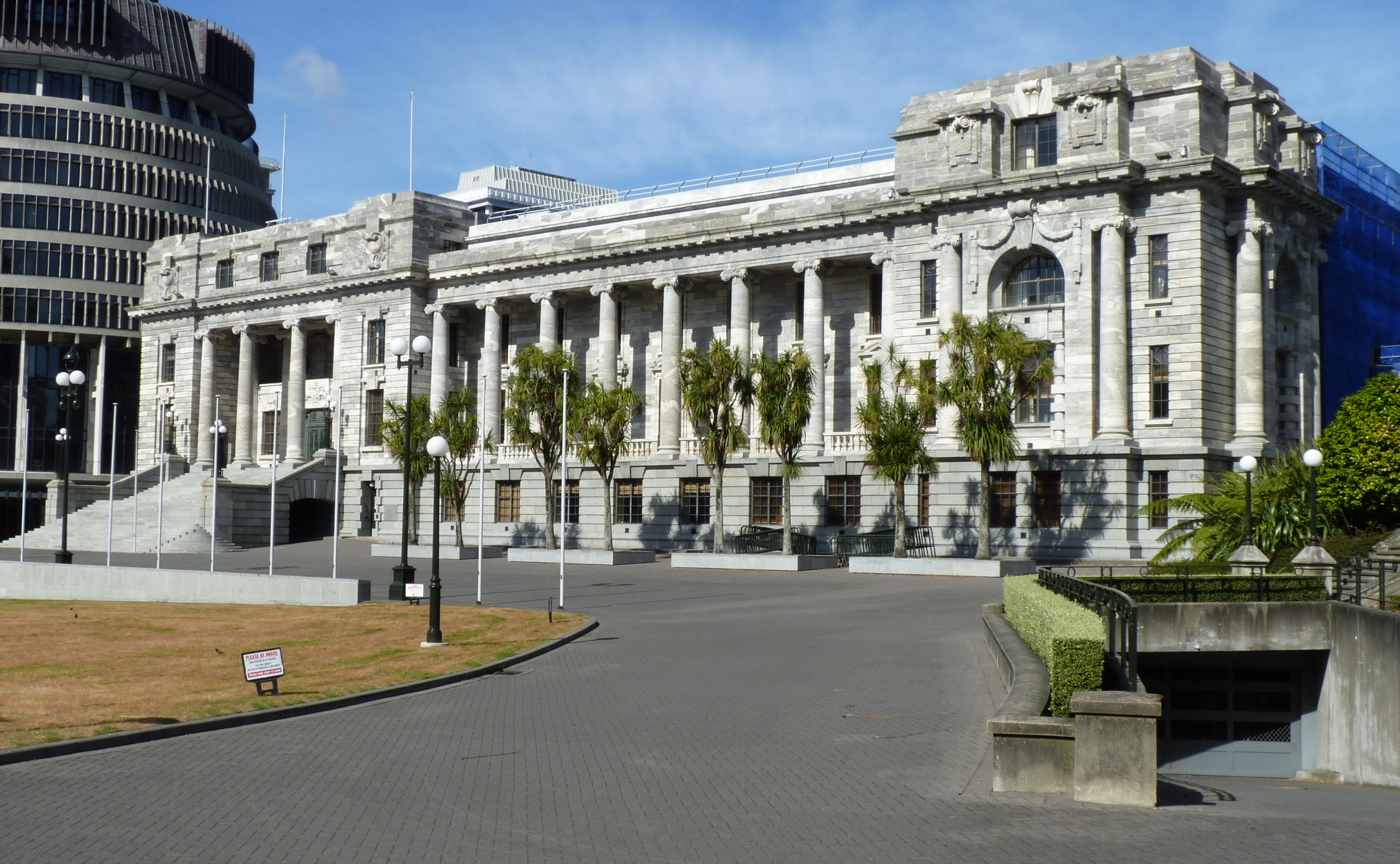
- Parliament House, Wellington

Overview
- Legislative body: New Zealand Parliament
- Term: 27 June 1950 – 31 July 1951
- Election: 1949 New Zealand general election
- Government: First National Government

House of Representatives
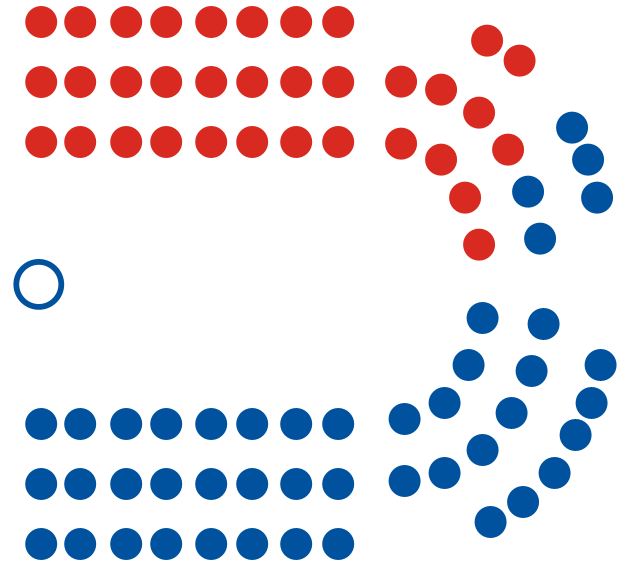
- Members: 80
- Speaker of the House: Matthew Oram
- Prime Minister: Sidney Holland
- Leader of the Opposition: Walter Nash from 17 January 1951 — Peter Fraser until 12 December 1950 †

Legislative Council Abolished: 1 December 1950
- Members: 54
- Speaker of the Council: Thomas Bishop
- Leader of the Council: William Polson

Sovereign
- Monarch: HM George VI
- Governor-General: HE Lt. Gen. The Lord Freyberg

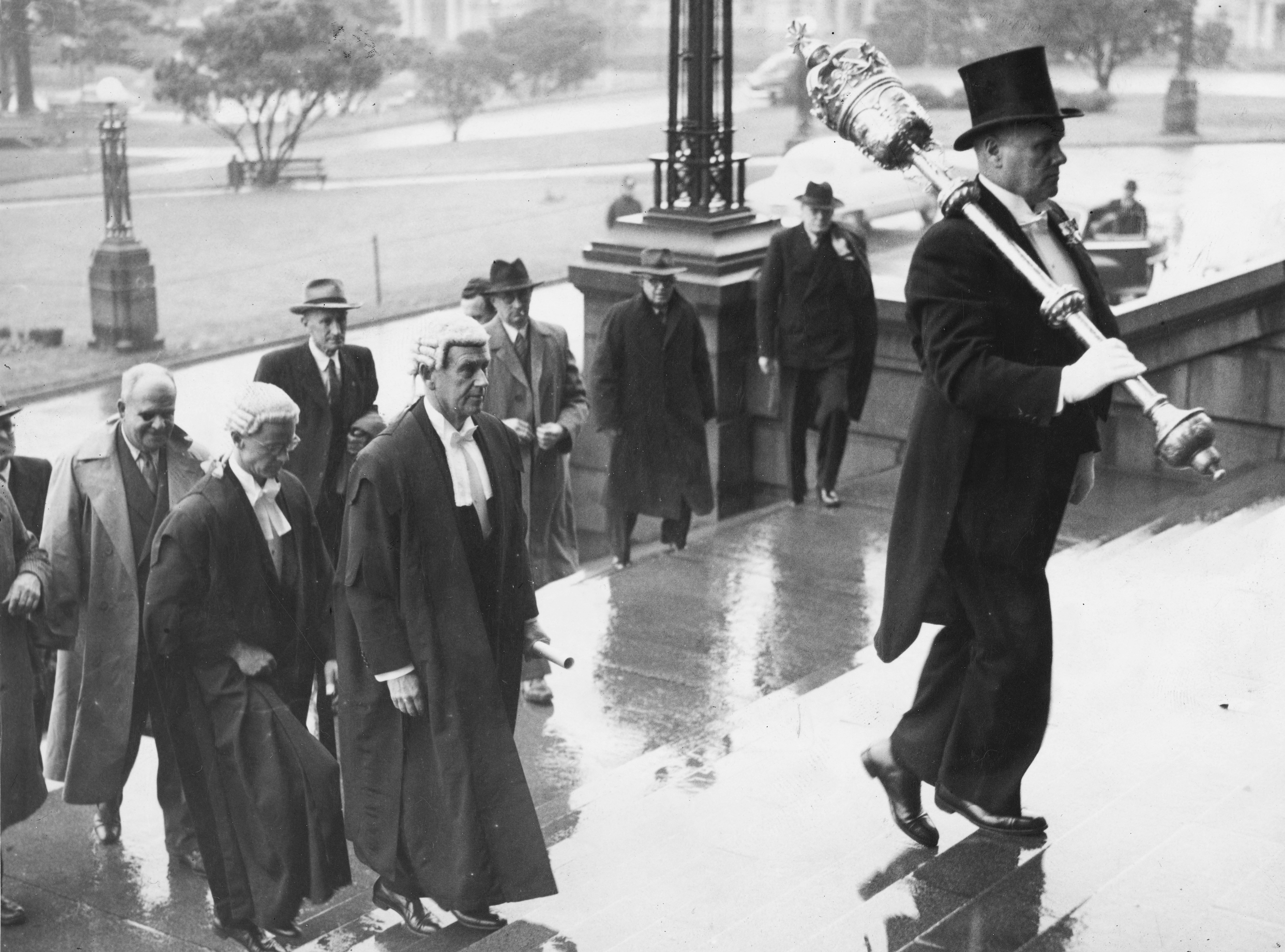
Opening of 29th NZ Parliament in 1950, with Serjeant-at-Arms, Group Captain Alexander Manson carrying the mace, followed by Speaker Matthew Oram

The 29th New Zealand Parliament was a term of the Parliament of New Zealand. It opened in 1950, following the 1949 general election. It was dissolved in 1951 in preparation for the 1951 general election. The governing Labour Party had been defeated in the election by the National Party. This marked the end of the First Labour government and the beginning of the First National government.

Additionally, this Parliament saw the final meeting of the Upper House; the Legislative Council, which was abolished on 1 December 1950, making the New Zealand Parliament a unicameral legislative body.

== 1949 general election ==
The 1949 general election was held on Tuesday, 29 November in the Māori electorates and on Wednesday, 30 November in the general electorates, respectively. A total of 80 MPs were elected; 49 represented North Island electorates, 27 represented South Island electorates, and the remaining four represented Māori electorates; this was the same distribution used since the 1946 election. 1,113,852 voters were enrolled and the official turnout at the election was 93.5%.

== Sessions ==
The 29th Parliament sat for two sessions, and was prorogued on 18 July 1951.

Session	Opened	Adjourned
first	27 June 1950	1 December 1950
second	26 June 1951	13 July 1951

== Ministries ==
The National Party under Sidney Holland won the 1949 election, defeating Labour's second Fraser Ministry. Holland remained in power until 1957, when he stepped down due to ill health.

== Historical context ==
The National Government appointed 25 new members to the New Zealand Legislative Council (the so-called Suicide Squad), so that the Legislative Council Abolition Bill could be passed. With that legislation, the Legislative Council voted itself out of existence, and New Zealand has been unicameral since the last meeting of the Upper House on 1 December 1950.

== Members ==
=== Overview ===
The table below shows the number of MPs in each party following the 1949 election and at dissolution:

Affiliation	Members	
Affiliation	At 1949 election	At dissolution
National Government	46	46
Labour Opposition	34	34
Total	80	80
Working Government majority	12	12

Notes

- The Working Government majority is calculated as all Government MPs less all other parties.

=== Initial MPs ===
The table below shows the results of the 1949 general election:

Key

Labour National

Electorate results for the 1949 New Zealand general election
Electorate	Incumbent	Winner	Majority	Runner up
General electorates
Arch Hill	Bill Parry		5,174	Gordon Frederick Smith
Ashburton	Geoff Gerard		2,385	William Erle Rose
Auckland Central	Bill Anderton		2,799	Leonard Bradley
Avon	John Mathison		4,593	George Nelson Kinzett
Awarua	George Richard Herron		3,179	Neville Pickering
Bay of Plenty	Bill Sullivan		3,680	Thomas Godfrey Santon
Brooklyn	Peter Fraser		2,956	Berta Burns
Buller	Jerry Skinner		2,206	Phil McDonald
Central Otago	William Bodkin		3,906	Thomas Augustus Rodgers
Christchurch Central	Robert Macfarlane		3,637	Kevin Marlow
Clutha	James Roy		3,231	John Edward Keenan
Dunedin Central	Phil Connolly		989	David Murdoch
Dunedin North	Robert Walls		668	Richard Brickell
Eden	Wilfred Fortune		2,259	Pat Curran
Egmont	Ernest Corbett		4,539	Brian Edgar Richmond
Fendalton	Sidney Holland		4,076	Robert Newman
Franklin	Jack Massey		5,481	John Parsons
Gisborne	David Coleman	Reginald Keeling	489	Harry Dudfield
Grey Lynn	Fred Hackett		4,203	John Leon Faulkner
Hamilton	Hilda Ross		1,605	Jack Granville
Hastings	Ted Cullen	Sydney Jones	982	Ted Cullen
Hauraki	Andy Sutherland		3,944	Percival Peacock
Hawke's Bay	Cyril Harker		3,442	Dick Beattie
Hobson	Sidney Walter Smith		5,068	William Edmund Lane
Hurunui	William Gillespie		2,535	Arthur J. Smith
Hutt	Walter Nash		2,273	Horace Leonard Heatley
Invercargill	Ralph Hanan		1,159	William Denham
Island Bay	Robert McKeen		2,770	Herbert Edward Childs
Karori	Charles Bowden		3,585	Ethel Harris
Lyttelton	Terry McCombs		978	Richard Ralph Beauchamp
Manawatu	Matthew Oram		3,433	Basil A. Rodgers
Marlborough	Tom Shand		1,862	James Harrison Wilson
Marsden	Alfred Murdoch		3,276	Douglas L. Ross
Miramar	Bob Semple		1,315	Cuthbert Taylor
Mornington	Wally Hudson		4,185	Geoffrey Stephens
Mount Albert	Warren Freer		931	Reg Judson
Mount Victoria	Jack Marshall		1,808	Nathan Seddon
Napier	Tommy Armstrong		721	William Tucker
Nelson	Edgar Neale		1,373	Reynell Marshall
New Plymouth	Ernest Aderman		1,517	Clarence Robert Parker
North Shore	Martyn Finlay	Dean Eyre	1,344	Martyn Finlay
Oamaru	Arnold Nordmeyer	Thomas Hayman	694	Arnold Nordmeyer
Onehunga	Arthur Osborne		2,300	Alan A. Coates
Onslow	Harry Combs		1,927	John S. Meadowcroft
Otahuhu	Charles Petrie	Leon Götz	1,275	Alex Dixon
Otaki	Jimmy Maher		374	Denzil Capstick
Pahiatua	Keith Holyoake		4,507	George Patrick O'Leary
Palmerston North	Ormond Wilson	Blair Tennent	518	Ormond Wilson
Parnell	Duncan Rae		960	Bill Schramm
Patea	William Sheat		1,841	Frederick William Finer
Petone	Mick Moohan		2,527	Norm Croft
Piako	Stan Goosman		6,266	Gilbert Parsons Kenah
Ponsonby	Ritchie Macdonald		2,278	Brian Kingston
Raglan	Alan Baxter	Hallyburton Johnstone	1,022	Alan Baxter
Rangitikei	Edward Gordon		3,310	Eric De Malmanche
Remuera	Ronald Algie		5,079	Hugh Watt
Riccarton	Angus McLagan		2,707	Harry Lake
Rodney	Clifton Webb		4,546	Arthur Leaming
Roskill	Frank Langstone	John Rae	1,415	James Freeman
St Albans	Jack Watts		1,142	George Manning
St Kilda	Fred Jones		331	Gerald Lyon
Selwyn	John McAlpine		1,327	Alan Sharp
Sydenham	Mabel Howard		5,643	Oliver G. Moody
Tamaki	Tom Skinner	Eric Halstead	1,095	Tom Skinner
Tauranga	Frederick Doidge		4,595	Hillary Joseph Pickett
Timaru	Clyde Carr		832	Jack Lockington
Waikato	Geoffrey Sim		5,923	John Ronald Burfitt
Waimarino	Paddy Kearins		202	Arthur Herbert MacPherson
Waimate	David Campbell Kidd		1,767	Roy Davison
Wairarapa	Garnet Mackley	Bert Cooksley	963	George Anders Hansen
Waitakere	Rex Mason		930	Robert Tapper
Waitomo	Walter Broadfoot		5,079	Frank Kitts
Wallace	Tom Macdonald		4,511	Herman Victor Freeman
Wanganui	Joe Cotterill		1,019	Ernest Victor O'Keefe
Wellington Central	Charles Chapman		575	Will Appleton
Westland	Jim Kent		2,744	Patrick Joseph O'Regan
Māori electorates
Eastern Maori	Tiaki Omana		3,211	Turi Carroll
Northern Maori	Tapihana Paraire Paikea		2,029	James Henare
Southern Maori	Eruera Tirikatene		687	Huro Nathanial Bates
Western Maori	vacant (Note: Matiu Ratana, the previous holder of the Western Maori electorate, died on 7 October 1949. His wife Iriaka Rātana stood for election instead.)	Iriaka Rātana	6,317	Hoeroa Marumaru

Table footnotes:

=== By-elections during 29th Parliament ===
There was one by-election during the term of the 29th Parliament.

Electorate and by-election		Date	Incumbent	Cause	Winner
Brooklyn	1951	17 February	Peter Fraser	Death	Arnold Nordmeyer
