= 28th New Zealand Parliament =

1946–1949 term of the then bicameral legislature

28th Parliament of New Zealand
←	27th Parliament	29th Parliament	→
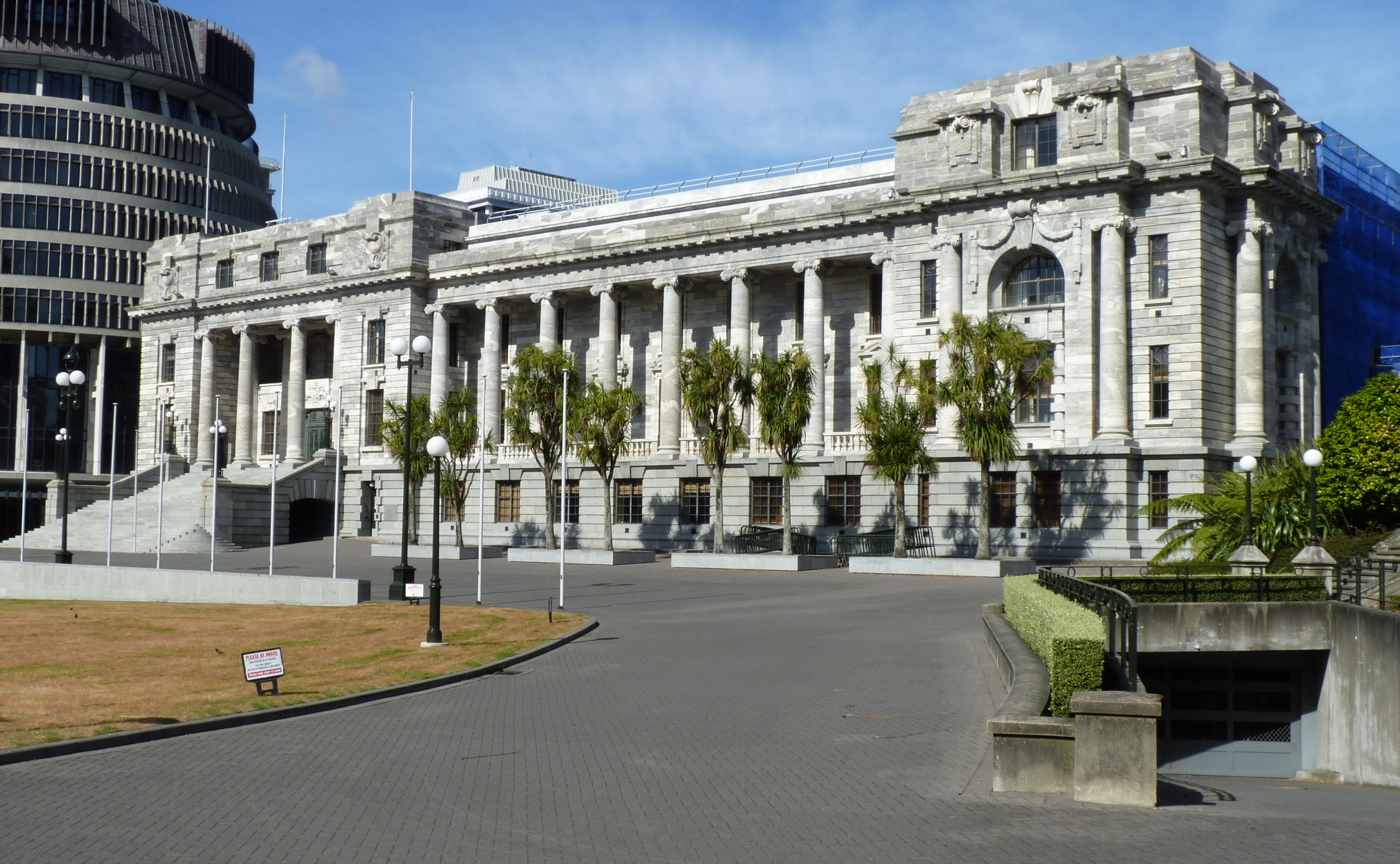
- Parliament House, Wellington

Overview
- Legislative body: New Zealand Parliament
- Term: 24 June 1947 – 21 October 1949
- Election: 1946 New Zealand general election
- Government: First Labour Government

House of Representatives
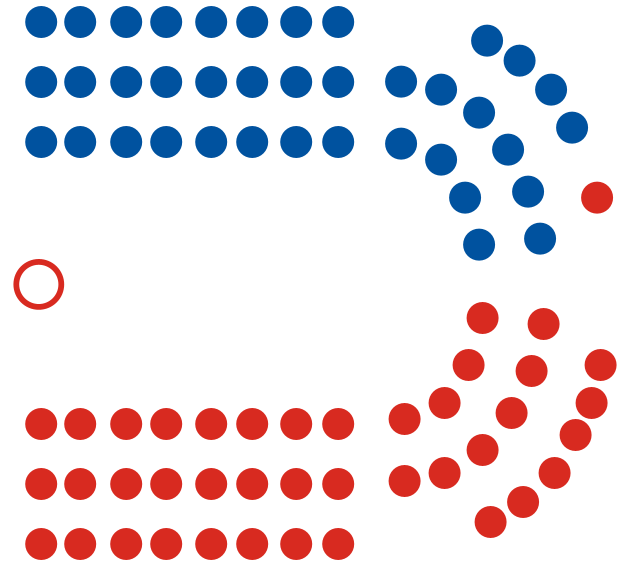
- Members: 80
- Speaker of the House: Robert McKeen
- Prime Minister: Peter Fraser
- Leader of the Opposition: Sidney Holland

Legislative Council
- Members: 36 (at start); 33 (at end)
- Speaker of the Council: Bernard Martin from 29 June 1948 — Mark Fagan until 31 December 1947 †
- Leader of the Council: David Wilson

Sovereign
- Monarch: HM George VI
- Governor-General: HE Lt. Gen. The Lord Freyberg

The 28th New Zealand Parliament was a term of the New Zealand Parliament. It was elected at the 1946 general election in November of that year.

== 1946 general election ==
The 1946 general election was held on Tuesday, 26 November in the Māori electorates and on Wednesday, 27 November in the general electorates, respectively. A total of 80 MPs were elected; 49 represented North Island electorates, 27 represented South Island electorates, and the remaining four represented Māori electorates. 1,081,898 voters were enrolled and the official turnout at the election was 93.5%.

== Sessions ==
The 28th Parliament sat for three sessions, and was prorogued on 3 November 1949:

Session	Opened	Adjourned
first	24 June 1947	27 November 1947
second	22 June 1948	3 December 1948
third	28 June 1949	21 October 1949

== Ministries ==
Peter Fraser of the Labour Party had been Prime Minister since 27 March 1940. He had formed the first Fraser Ministry on 1 April 1940 and the second Fraser Ministry on 30 April 1940. The second Fraser Ministry remained in power until its defeat by the National Party at the 1949 election.

== Party standings ==
Party	Leader(s)	Seats
Labour Party	Peter Fraser	42
National Party	Sidney Holland	38

== Members ==
=== Initial MPs ===
The table below shows the results of the 1946 general election:

Key

Labour National Independent

Electorate results for the 1946 New Zealand general election
Electorate	Incumbent	Winner	Majority	Runner up
General electorates
Arch Hill	New electorate	Bill Parry	6,585	Edward James Clark
Ashburton	New electorate	Geoff Gerard	1,453	Mabel Newlands
Auckland Central	Bill Parry	Bill Anderton	3,478	Leon Götz
Avon	Dan Sullivan		5,180	Robert Alexander McDowell
Awarua	George Richard Herron		2,588	Gilbert Gregory Mitchell
Bay of Plenty	Bill Sullivan		1,634	Ray Boord
Brooklyn	New electorate	Peter Fraser	3,935	Stewart Hardy
Buller	Paddy Webb	Jerry Skinner	2,912	Phil McDonald
Central Otago	William Bodkin		2,909	Claude Charles Capell
Christchurch Central	New electorate	Robert Macfarlane	4,420	Alan J. Wills
Clutha	James Roy		2,140	John Patrick Thompson
Dunedin Central	Peter Neilson	Phil Connolly	2,000	Stuart Sidey
Dunedin North	Robert Walls		1,630	Norman Jones
Eden	Bill Anderton	Wilfred Fortune	1,281	Warren Freer
Egmont	Ernest Corbett		3,398	Clarence Robert Parker
Fendalton	New electorate	Sidney Holland	3,004	Alan Williams
Franklin	Jack Massey		4,023	Alex Gunn
Gisborne	David Coleman		2,015	Harry Barker
Grey Lynn	Fred Hackett		5,910	Harold Stapleton Barry
Hamilton	Hilda Ross		327	Jack Granville
Hastings	New electorate	Ted Cullen	483	Eric Pryor
Hauraki	Andy Sutherland		2,891	John William Neate
Hawke's Bay	Ted Cullen	Cyril Harker	2,014	Henry Edward Beattie
Hobson	New electorate	Sidney Walter Smith	3,580	Hubert Knox Hatrick
Hurunui	William Gillespie		1,440	John Mathison
Hutt	Walter Nash		2,587	Jim Vogel
Invercargill	William Denham	Ralph Hanan	224	William Denham
Island Bay	New electorate	Robert McKeen	3,958	Herbert Edward Childs
Karori	New electorate	Charles Bowden	2,042	Patrick McGavin
Lyttelton	Terry McCombs		1,543	Ted Taylor
Manawatu	Matthew Oram		2,467	Phil Holloway
Marlborough	Ted Meachen	Tom Shand	179	Ted Meachen
Marsden	Alfred Murdoch		2,149	John Stewart
Miramar	New electorate	Bob Semple	2,482	Len Jacobsen
Mornington	New electorate	Wally Hudson	4,681	Lewis Donald McIver
Mount Albert	New electorate	Arthur Shapton Richards	1,857	Frederick Ashley Hosking
Mount Victoria	New electorate	Jack Marshall	911	Eugene Casey
Napier	Tommy Armstrong		1,845	Alan John Price
Nelson	vacant (Note: Harry Atmore, the previous holder of the Nelson electorate, died on 20 August 1946)	Edgar Neale	585	Cyril Harold Goodman
New Plymouth	Ernest Aderman		405	George Nimmo
North Shore	New electorate	Martyn Finlay	249	Henry Thorne Morton
Oamaru	Arnold Nordmeyer		232	Thomas Ross Beatty
Onehunga	Arthur Osborne		3,424	William Kenneth King
Onslow	New electorate	Harry Combs	1,578	Philip Patrick Lynch
Otahuhu	Charles Robert Petrie		220	Albert Murdoch
Otaki	Leonard Lowry	Jimmy Maher	44	Jim Thorn
Pahiatua	Keith Holyoake		3,697	Otto Ernest Niederer
Palmerston North	Joe Hodgens	Ormond Wilson	928	Gus Mansford
Parnell	New electorate	Duncan Rae	206	Bill Schramm
Patea	William Sheat		870	Richard John O'Dea
Petone	New electorate	Mick Moohan	4,019	George London
Piako	New electorate	Stan Goosman	5,101	Ben Waters
Ponsonby	New electorate	Ritchie Macdonald	3,431	Peter E Dempsey
Raglan	Hallyburton Johnstone	Alan Baxter	13	Hallyburton Johnstone
Rangitikei	Edward Gordon		2,307	John Capstick
Remuera	Ronald Algie		4,410	James Freeman
Riccarton	Jack Watts	Angus McLagan	3,875	Vic Wilson
Rodney	New electorate	Clifton Webb	2,850	Alex Dixon
Roskill	Arthur Shapton Richards	Frank Langstone	155	Roy McElroy
St Albans	New electorate	Jack Watts	86	Morgan Williams
St Kilda	New electorate	Fred Jones	1,248	Leonard James Ireland
Selwyn	New electorate	John McAlpine	472	Alan Sharp
Sydenham	New electorate	Mabel Howard	6,746	Ruric Hunter
Tamaki	New electorate	Tom Skinner	231	John George Concanon Wales
Tauranga	Frederick Doidge		2,704	Dudley A. Hill
Timaru	Clyde Carr		520	Jack Acland
Waikato	Stan Goosman	Geoffrey Sim	4,385	John Dwyer
Waimarino	Frank Langstone	Paddy Kearins	681	Norman Robert Hill
Waimate	New electorate	David Campbell Kidd	789	William Roy Davison
Wairarapa	Ben Roberts	Garnet Mackley	235	George Anders Hansen
Waitakere	New electorate	Rex Mason	2,797	Archibald Morrison Laing
Waitomo	Walter Broadfoot		3,951	Alan George Goldsmith
Wallace	Adam Hamilton	Tom Macdonald	3,716	David Munro
Wanganui	Joe Cotterill		1,934	Eric Merewether
Wellington Central	Peter Fraser	Charles Chapman	1,680	Agnes Weston (Note: Claude Weston died suddenly on 10 November 1946 and was replaced by his wife)
Westland	James O'Brien		4,716	Frank Chivers
Māori electorates
Eastern Maori	Tiaki Omana		1,517	Āpirana Ngata
Northern Maori	Tapihana Paraire Paikea		2,555	James Henare
Southern Maori	Eruera Tirikatene		581	Vernon Ohaia Mason Thomas
Western Maori	Matiu Ratana		6,491	Hoeroa Marumaru

Table footnotes:

=== By-elections during 28th Parliament ===
There were a number of changes during the term of the 28th Parliament.

Electorate and by-election		Date	Incumbent	Cause	Winner
Avon	1947	28 May	Dan Sullivan	Death	Jock Mathison
Mount Albert	1947	24 September	Arthur Richards	Death	Warren Freer
Westland	1947	3 December	James O'Brien	Death	Jim Kent
