= 1957 New Zealand general election =

- 30 November 1957

All 80 seats in the New Zealand Parliament 41 seats were needed for a majority
- Turnout: 1,157,365 (92.9%) ▲
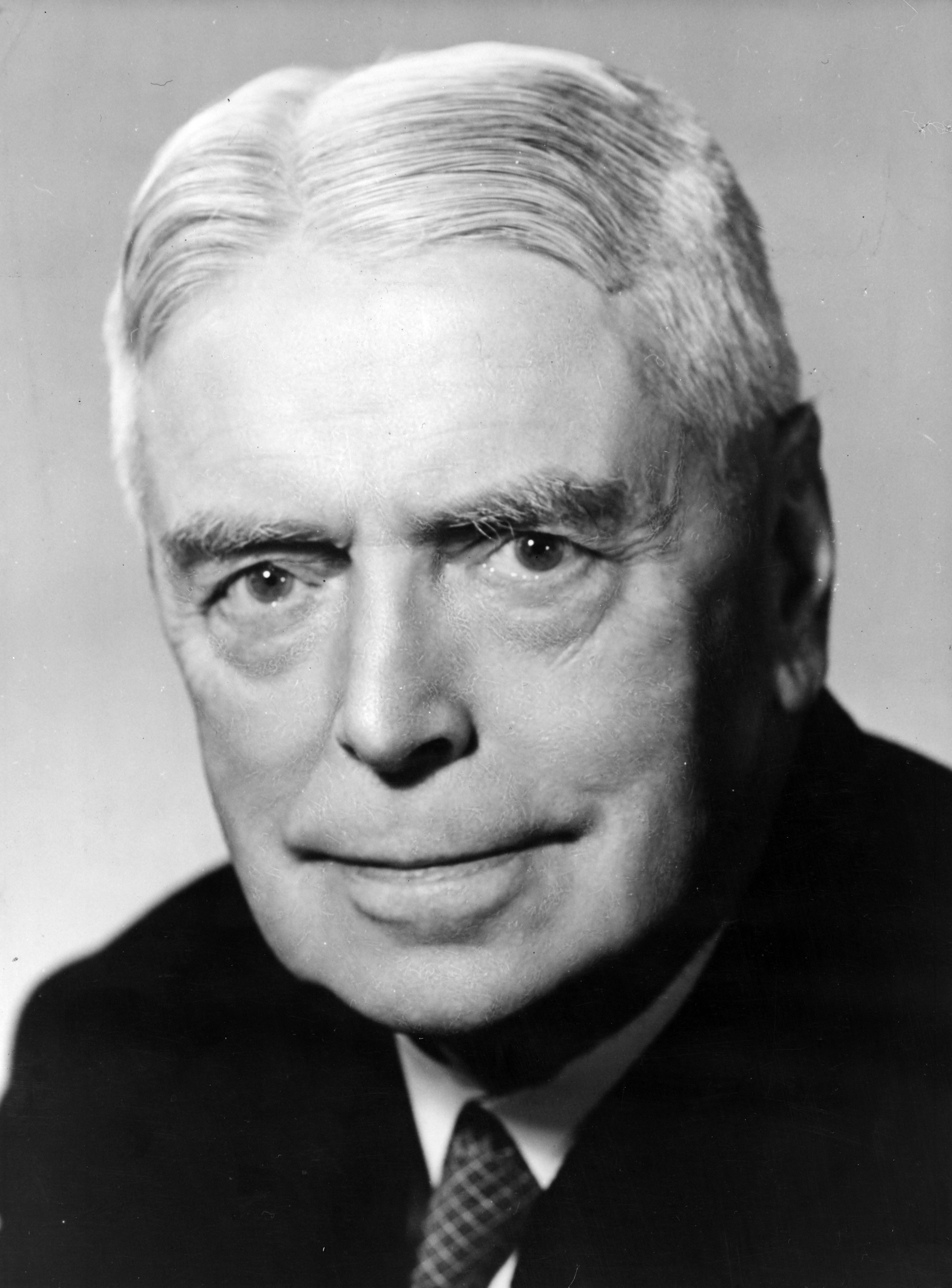

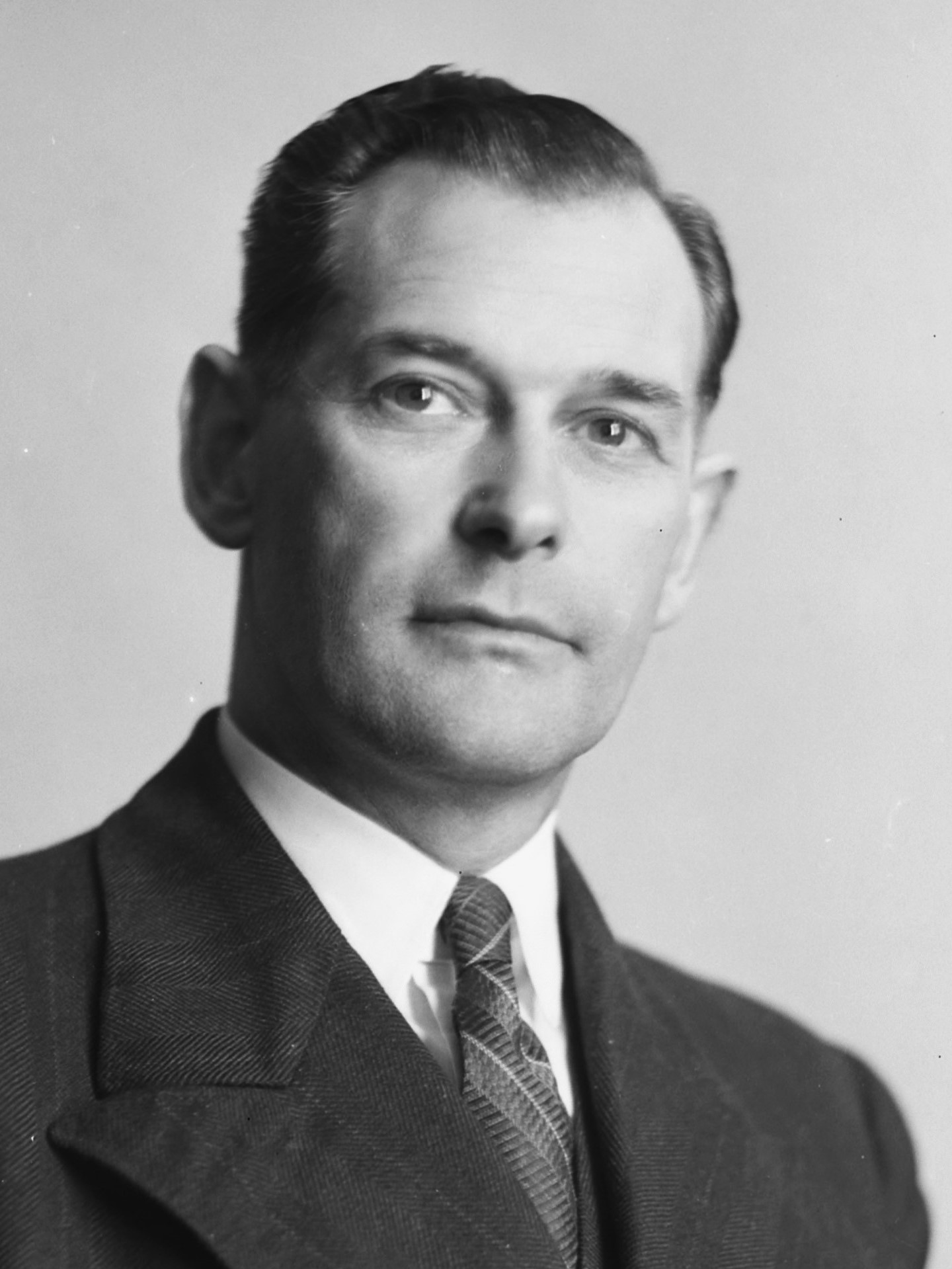
	First party	Second party
Leader	Walter Nash	Keith Holyoake
Party	Labour	National
Leader since	17 January 1951	13 August 1957
Leader's seat	Hutt	Pahiatua
Last election	35 seats, 44.1%	45 seats, 44.3%
Seats won	41	39
Seat change	▲6	▼6
Popular vote	559,096	511,699
Percentage	48.3%	44.2%
Swing	▲4.2%	▼0.1%
- Results by electorate, shaded by winning margin
Prime Minister before election
Keith Holyoake
National
Subsequent Prime Minister
Walter Nash
Labour

The 1957 New Zealand general election was a nationwide vote to determine the shape of the New Zealand Parliament's 32nd term. It saw the governing National Party narrowly defeated by the Labour Party. The 1957 elections marked the beginning of the second Labour government, although this administration was to last only a single term.

== Background ==
The National Party had formed its first administration after the 1949 elections, and had been re-elected in the 1951 elections and the 1954 elections. As its third term in office continued, however, the Prime Minister, Sidney Holland, became increasingly ill. Holland's memory began to fail, and he is believed to have suffered a mild heart attack while working in his office during the Suez Crisis. In mid-1957 a group of senior cabinet ministers led by Keith Holyoake, Jack Marshall, Jack Watts and party president, Sir Alex McKenzie, persuaded Holland to resign citing his health deterioration. Holland, albeit reluctantly, announced his retirement from the leadership at the National's annual party conference on 12 August 1957 held in Christchurch. Almost immediately after finishing his speech Holland collapsed backstage and was rushed to hospital in an ambulance. Although his retirement was announced in August, Holland's continued presence prevented his successor, the deputy prime minister Holyoake, from establishing himself as a leader until late October, when at last he formed his own ministry which was still largely the same as his predecessor's.

Leadership was to play a key issue in the election. After spending many years in Holland's shadow, Holyoake, a reserved man lacking Holland's rapport with crowds, was unable to achieve any clear popular image in his own right. Labour's Walter Nash, by contrast, was one of the best-known people in the country, having been a party leader for many years and having been Finance Minister in the first Labour government before that.

Labour opened its campaign on 5 November with Nash broadcasting a speech from the Auckland Town Hall (despites some reservations of it coinciding with Guy Fawkes Night). The speech, mainly regarding Labour's economic policies, was regarded by listeners as excellent with Nash in fine speaking form. Nash would give over twenty other speeches at public meetings throughout the country where he attracted large and receptive crowds. One daytime meeting late in the campaign, Nash arrived behind schedule, and a crowd of employees forfeited an hour's pay (having already taken their lunchbreak) so they could hear him speak. Holyoake, by contrast, attracted little interest in his meeting addresses (particularly in the South Island).

In terms of policy, the election campaign was dominated largely by financial issues, particularly regarding the introduction of the PAYE system of income tax. As a campaign promise, Labour announced that in the year that PAYE commenced, there would be a flat rebate of £100 on income tax. National, seeing the popularity of the policy, was forced into offering a similar policy. The Labour Party's president, Mick Moohan, seeing this popularity came to the view that the election was akin to an auction. He published a newspaper advertisement which boldly asked: 'DO YOU WANT £100 OR NOT?'. Nash found the ad distasteful thinking it could be interpreted as a bribe. National attacked the ad as misleading by implying that everyone would receive a £100 rebate, whether or not they actually paid as much as £100 in tax.

Labour also campaigned to abolish compulsory military training, opposing nuclear tests, 3% housing loans, increased pension payments, free textbooks for school children and industrialisation. National made no great changes to its existing policy platform.

=== Electoral boundary changes ===
As part of the redistribution process following the 1954 election, the Boundaries Commission made several adjustments to electorate boundaries. Two electorates were entirely abolished (Oamaru and Waimate), with two new constituencies created in their place (Piako and Waitaki). These changes reflected demographic shifts and ensured more equitable representation across regions.

The total number of electorates remained unchanged at 80, comprising 76 general and 4 Māori electorates, a configuration unchanged since the Fifteenth Parliament in 1902.

=== MPs retiring in 1957 ===
Six National MPs intended to retire at the end of the 31st Parliament. No Labour MPs retired.

Party	Name	Electorate
National	Ernest Corbett	Egmont
National	George Herron	Awarua
National	Sidney Holland	Fendalton
National	Tom Macdonald	Wallace
National	Edgar Neale	Nelson
National	Matthew Oram	Manawatu

Jack Massey also left parliament at the election. He intended to stand again in Franklin but was deselected as a candidate by the National Party.

== The election ==
The date for the main 1957 election was 30 November. 1,252,329 people were registered to vote, and turnout was 92.9%. This turnout, although only average for the time, was not to be equalled or exceeded until the 1984 election. The number of seats being contested was 80, a number which had been fixed since 1902.

The Labour candidate for Clutha, Bruce Waters, died the day before the general election, and the election there was postponed to 18 January 1958. The unusual situation of an electorate vote being delayed due to the death of a candidate did not occur again until the 2023 election.

The election saw a record number of candidates: 259 individuals representing 13 distinct political parties or affiliations, the highest number since 1935. This marked a noticeable increase from the previous election, with four additional candidates and four more political groups contesting the vote.

== Election results ==
=== Party standings ===
The 1957 election saw the governing National Party defeated by a narrow two-seat margin. It had previously held a ten-seat majority. National won a total of thirty-nine seats, while the Labour Party won forty-one. In the popular vote, National won 44% to Labour's 48%. The Social Credit Party won 7% of the vote, a drop from its previous result of 11%. It still won no seats.

Election results
Party	Candidates	Total votes	Percentage	Seats won	change
Labour	80	559,096	48.31	41	+6
National	80	511,699	44.21	39	−6
Social Credit	80	83,498	7.21	0	±0
Communist	5	706	0.06	0	±0
Liberal Federation	2	282	0.02	0	±0
Independents	11	2,084	0.18	0	±0
Total	258	1,157,365		80	

=== Votes summary ===
Popular Vote
Labour	48.31%
National	44.21%
Social Credit	7.21%
Others	0.26%

Parliament seats
Labour	51.25%
National	48.75%

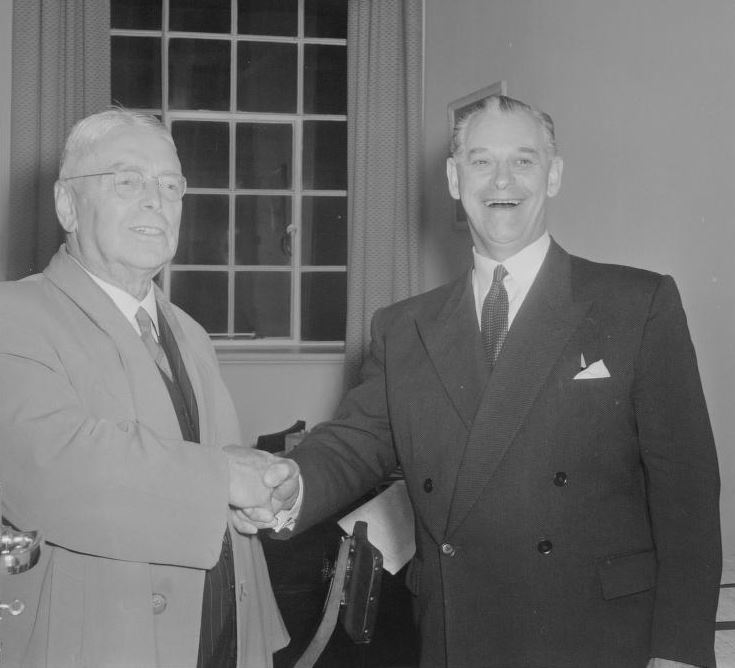
Holyoake (right) congratulating Nash (left) on Labour's victory.

The table below shows the results of the 1957 general election:

Key

Labour National

Electorate results for the 1957 New Zealand general election.
Electorate	Incumbent	Winner	Majority	Runner up
General electorates
Ashburton	Geoff Gerard		1,769	George Glassey
Auckland Central	Bill Anderton		3,856	Aileen Joyce
Avon	John Mathison		6,100	William Ernest Olds
Awarua	George Herron	Gordon Grieve	1,636	J P Wyatt
Bay of Plenty	Percy Allen		910	Godfrey Santon
Buller	Jerry Skinner		2,677	Norman Leon Bensemann
Christchurch Central	Robert Macfarlane		4,071	Colin McLachlan
Clutha	James Roy		1,490	Joseph Fahey (Note: The previous Labour candidate, Bruce Waters, died the day before the general election, so the election in Clutha was postponed to 18 January 1958)
Dunedin Central	Phil Connolly		1,778	Marcus Anderson
Dunedin North	Ethel McMillan		3,408	George Terry
Eden	Duncan Rae		498	Ian Watkins
Egmont	Ernest Corbett	William Sheat	2,697	Clarence Robert Parker
Fendalton	Sidney Holland	Jack Watts	824	Lawrence White
Franklin	Jack Massey	Alfred E. Allen	4,241	Christopher Mountford
Gisborne	Reginald Keeling		1,182	Arthur MacPherson
Grey Lynn	Fred Hackett		5,785	Bernard Griffiths
Hamilton	Hilda Ross		1,110	Ben Waters
Hastings	Ted Keating		1,070	Arthur Henry Sivewright
Hauraki	Arthur Kinsella		1,161	Brevat William Dynes
Hawkes Bay	Cyril Harker		2,858	Leonard Thomas Fischer
Heretaunga	Phil Holloway		5,117	Allan McCready
Hobson	Sidney Smith		3,134	Colin Moyle
Hurunui	William Gillespie		1,749	Lyn Christie
Hutt	Walter Nash		4,430	Lance Adams-Schneider
Invercargill	Ralph Hanan		679	Thomas Francis Doyle
Island Bay	Arnold Nordmeyer		4,209	Saul Goldsmith
Karori	Jack Marshall		3,061	Keith Spry
Lyttelton	Harry Lake	Norman Kirk	567	Harry Lake
Manawatu	Matthew Oram	Blair Tennent	1,575	Patrick Kelliher
Manukau	Leon Götz		159	Cyril Douglas Stamp
Marlborough	Tom Shand		1,782	Roy Evans
Marsden	Don McKay		2,088	Mervyn Allan Hosking
Miramar	Bill Fox		2,077	Clevedon Costello
Mornington	Wally Hudson		2,817	Walter MacDougall
Mt Albert	Warren Freer		3,987	Geoffrey Taylor
Napier	Jim Edwards		2,413	Ray Foster
Nelson	Edgar Neale	Stan Whitehead	509	Colin Wilson Martin
New Plymouth	Ernest Aderman		657	Ron Barclay
North Shore	Dean Eyre		462	Peter Lawrence Smith
Onehunga	Hugh Watt		5,686	Donald Watson
Onslow	Henry May		2,675	Kevin O'Brien
Otago Central	Jack George		2,788	J H Rapson
Otahuhu	James Deas		3,442	Clive Haszard
Otaki	Jimmy Maher		1,122	Cyril Shamy
Pahiatua	Keith Holyoake		4,020	William Erle Rose
Palmerston North	Philip Skoglund		1,348	Bill Brown
Patea	Roy Jack		902	Benjamin R. Winchcombe
Petone	Mick Moohan		4,159	Dan Riddiford
Piako	New electorate	Stan Goosman	3,812	Alistair Walker
Ponsonby	Ritchie Macdonald		6,592	Gordon Frederick Smith
Raglan	Hallyburton Johnstone	Douglas Carter	161	Alan Baxter
Rangitikei	Norman Shelton		2,983	Stephen Malcolm Roberton
Remuera	Ronald Algie		4,766	Russell Penney
Riccarton	Mick Connelly		2,867	Deena V. Sergel
Rodney	Jack Scott		3,112	George Webber
Roskill	John Rae	Arthur Faulkner	2,117	John Rae
Rotorua	Ray Boord		2,009	Murray Linton
Selwyn	John McAlpine		1,731	Stanley Marshall Cook
St Albans	Jack Watts	Neville Pickering	501	Eric Philip Wills
St Kilda	Jim Barnes	Bill Fraser	791	Jim Barnes
Stratford	Thomas Murray		3,172	J M Deegan
Sydenham	Mabel Howard		6,450	Oliver G. Moody
Tamaki	Eric Halstead	Bob Tizard	589	Eric Halstead
Tauranga	George Walsh		3,342	Oliver Liddell
Timaru	Clyde Carr		2,954	Alfred Davey
Waikato	Geoffrey Sim		2,013	Arthur John Ingram
Waipa	Stan Goosman	Hallyburton Johnstone	1,813	Albert Clifford Tucker
Wairarapa	Bert Cooksley		1,058	Bob Wilkie
Waitakere	Rex Mason		3,682	Leonard Bradley
Waitaki	New electorate	Thomas Hayman	1,618	A G Braddock
Waitemata	Norman King		2,191	Robert Muldoon
Waitomo	David Seath		2,474	Vic Haines
Wallace	Tom Macdonald	Brian Talboys	4,319	John Reid
Wanganui	Joe Cotterill		1,419	Alice Kathleen Maclean
Wellington Central	Frank Kitts		1,685	Max Wall
Westland	Jim Kent		4,745	Fred Boustridge
Māori electorates
Eastern Maori	Tiaki Omana		4,197	Wiremu Hoete Maxwell
Northern Maori	Tapihana Paikea		4,310	Timothy James Davis
Southern Maori	Eruera Tirikatene		4,383	Thomas Stratton
Western Maori	Iriaka Rātana		5,553	Pei Te Hurinui Jones

Table footnotes:

== Post-election events ==
A number of local by-elections were required due to the resignations of incumbent local body politicians following the general election:

- Hugh Watt resigned his seat on the Auckland Harbour Board on 17 December 1957 after his appointment to cabinet.
- There were two by-elections for the Christchurch City Council. Councillors Mabel Howard and John Mathison also resigned their seats following their election as cabinet ministers at the formation of the Second Labour government causing a by-election to replace them on the council. Likewise Robert Macfarlane resigned as Mayor of Christchurch upon his selection as Speaker of the New Zealand House of Representatives. Macfarlane was succeeded as mayor by councillor George Manning. McFarlane was elected for one of the vacant seats on the council, with the other seats being won by Bill Glue, Bill MacGibbon and Peter Skellerup.
