= Robert Coulter =

Robert Coulter may refer to:

- Robert Coulter (Northern Ireland politician) (1929–2018)
- Robert Coulter (New Zealand politician) (1891–1945)
