= William Sheat =

New Zealand politician (1899–1982)

Bill Sheat
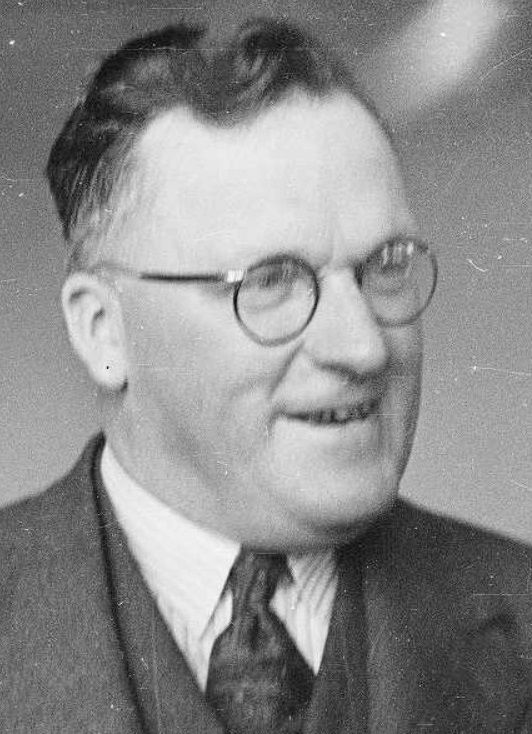
- Sheat in 1950

Member of the New Zealand Parliament for Egmont
- In office 30 November 1957 – 26 November 1966
- Preceded by: Ernest Corbett
- Succeeded by: Venn Young

Member of the New Zealand Parliament for Patea
- In office 25 September 1943 – 13 November 1954
- Preceded by: Harold Dickie
- Succeeded by: Roy Jack

Personal details
- Born: 23 May 1899
- Died: 24 May 1982 (aged 83)
- Party: National (from 1940); Labour (until 1935); Independent (1935–1940)
- Spouse: Ella Marjorie Newton
- Relations: Bill Sheat (son)

William Alfred Sheat (23 May 1899 – 24 May 1982) was a New Zealand Member of Parliament for two Taranaki electorates.

== Early life ==
Sheat was born at Pihama, Taranaki, in 1899. He was the son of Joseph Sheat and his wife Susannah (née Rose). He received his early education at Pihama Primary and Hawera District High School. He attended Victoria University College and graduated B.A. in 1920 and LL.B. in 1923. He married Ella Marjorie Newton, who was also a Victoria University College graduate (M.A. in 1925), on 22 January 1929. The wedding was held at St John's Presbyterian Church in Wellington. They had two sons, including Bill Sheat.

Sheat was admitted as a solicitor in 1922. He lectured economics at the Workers' Educational Association from 1923 to 1925. From 1926 to 1928, he taught at Marlborough College. From 1928, he farmed in Pihama.

== Political activity ==
New Zealand Parliament
Years	Term	Electorate	Party
1943–1946	27th	Patea	National
1946–1949	28th	Patea	National
1949–1951	29th	Patea	National
1951–1954	30th	Patea	National
1954	30th	Patea	Independent
1957–1960	32nd	Egmont	National
1960–1963	33rd	Egmont	National
1963–1966	34th	Egmont	National

=== Early political career ===
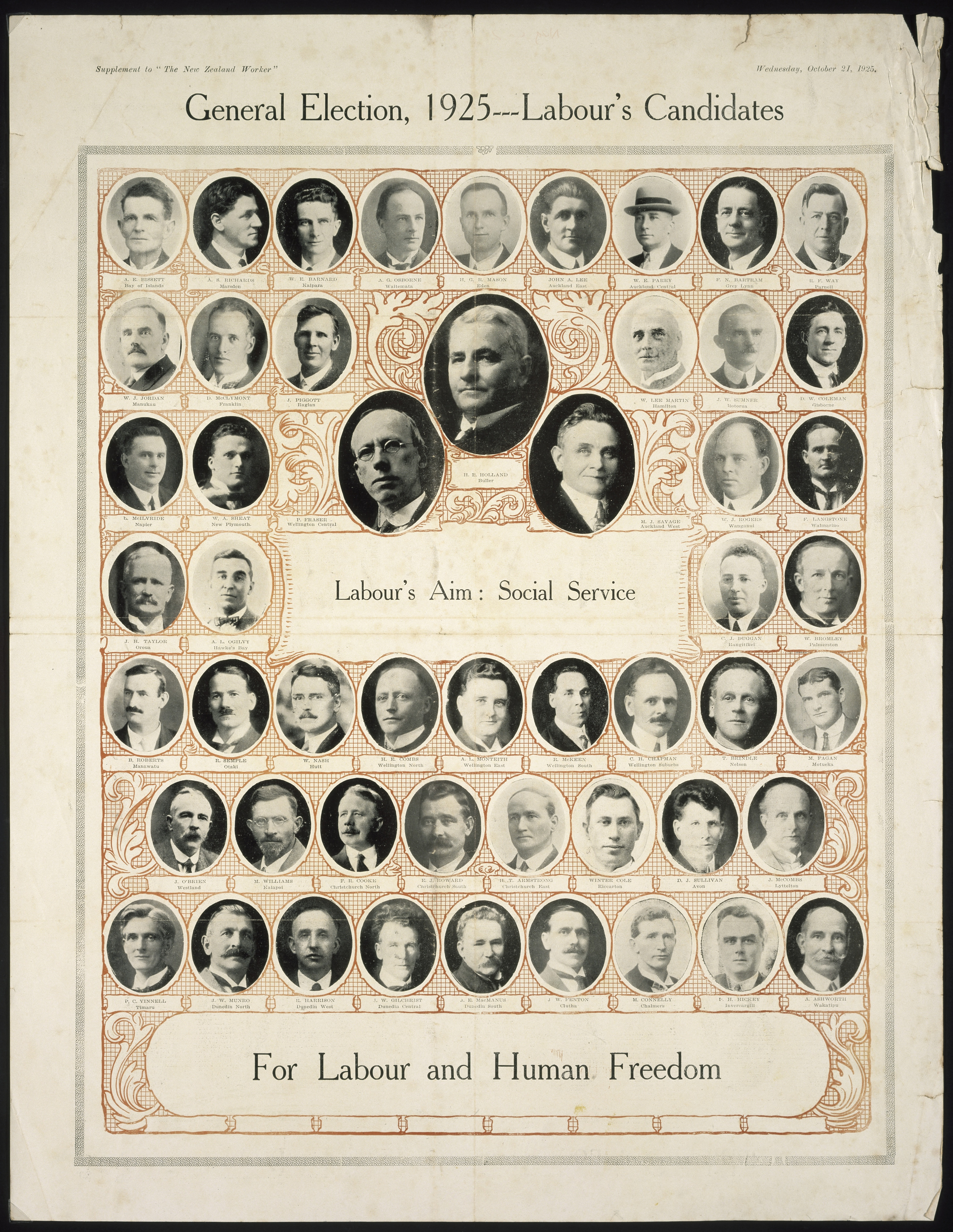
New Zealand Labour Party: General election, 1925 – Labour's candidates, including Bill Sheat

Sheat served on the Egmont County Council for twelve years. He was initially a member of the Labour Party and stood as the Labour candidate for Taranaki in 1925, and for New Plymouth in 1931. At the 1935 election, Sheat contested the New Plymouth electorate again, this time as an independent. He joined the National Party in 1940.

=== Member of Parliament ===
Bill Sheat represented the Patea electorate between 1943 and 1954 and then the Egmont electorate from 1957 to 1966.

In 1953, Sheat was awarded the Queen Elizabeth II Coronation Medal.

After a 1953 redistricting much of the Patea seat (including his residence) shifted to the Egmont electorate. The seat of Stratford had been recreated and the home of the incumbent MP for Egmont, Ernest Corbett, was now situated in Stratford. Sheat did not wish to represent the enlarged, mostly rural, Patea and thought it appropriate that he instead contest Egmont and Corbett contest Stratford. However Corbett was selected again in Egmont instead of Sheat, leading Sheat to accuse the local party electorate organiser of predetermining the candidacy. On 14 May 1954 he resigned his seat with the intention of winning it back at a by-election as an independent. He narrowly held the seat in the 31 July by-election, which National did not contest. He subsequently did not stand in the 1954 general election. In 1957 Sheat returned to Parliament as MP for Egmont after Corbett's retirement until he retired in 1966.

Sheat was Undersecretary to the Minister of Works between 1949 and 1954. Prior to his selection dispute he looked certain of gaining a cabinet post, but Keith Holyoake never forgave him for resigning and overlooked him when selecting his cabinet in 1960 and 1963. This was despite Sheat still defending the National Government against Labour's criticisms (particularly with regards to financial policy) while fighting the by-election as an independent candidate.

== Death ==
Sheat died on 24 May 1982, aged 83 years. He was cremated in the Wellington suburb of Karori four days later.

== Notes ==
New Zealand Parliament
Preceded by Harold Dickie	Member of Parliament for Patea; 1943–1954	Succeeded by Roy Jack
Preceded by Ernest Corbett	Member of Parliament for Egmont; 1957–1966	Succeeded by Venn Young
