= Douglas Carter =

New Zealand politician (1908–1988)

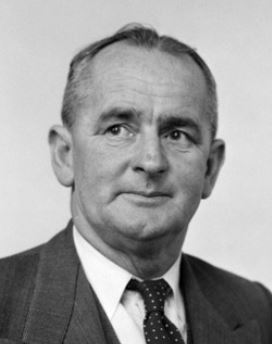
Carter in 1959

Sir Douglas Julian Carter KCMG (5 August 1908 – 7 November 1988) was a New Zealand politician of the National Party.

== Biography ==
New Zealand Parliament
Years	Term	Electorate	Party
1957–1960	32nd	Raglan	National
1960–1963	33rd	Raglan	National
1963–1966	34th	Raglan	National
1966–1969	35th	Raglan	National
1969–1972	36th	Raglan	National
1972–1975	37th	Raglan	National

Carter was born at Foxton in 1908, the son of Walter S. Carter. He received his education from Palmerston North and Waitaki Boys' High Schools. Afterwards, he was a farmer and active in various farming organisations. He was chairman of the New Zealand Pig Producers council, and was with the New Zealand Sharemilkers Employers Association, the Waikato Province Dairy Section of Federated Farmers, and was on the Waikato Primary Producers council.

In 1936, Carter married Mavis Rose Miles.

Carter represented the Raglan electorate from 1957 to 1975, when he retired. He was Minister of Agriculture under Keith Holyoake (1969–1972) and then John Marshall (1972), followed by Minister of Agriculture and Fisheries (New Zealand) (1972). He was Postmaster-General from 1969 to 1972. He retired from Parliament in 1975 and was succeeded by Marilyn Waring.

From 1976 to 1979, Carter was the High Commissioner to the United Kingdom.

In the 1977 Queen's Silver Jubilee and Birthday Honours, Carter was appointed a Knight Commander of the Order of St Michael and St George, for public services.

== Last years and death ==
The Carters lived in Taupiri. Douglas Carter died in Hamilton on 7 November 1988, aged 80, and was buried at Hamilton Park Cemetery.

== Notes ==
New Zealand Parliament
Preceded by Hallyburton Johnstone	Member of Parliament for Raglan; 1957–1975	Succeeded by Marilyn Waring
Diplomatic posts
Preceded by Hugh Watt	High Commissioner of New Zealand to the United Kingdom; 1976–1979	Succeeded by Les Gandar
