= Jack Watts (politician) =

New Zealand politician (1909–1970)

The Honourable Jack Watts
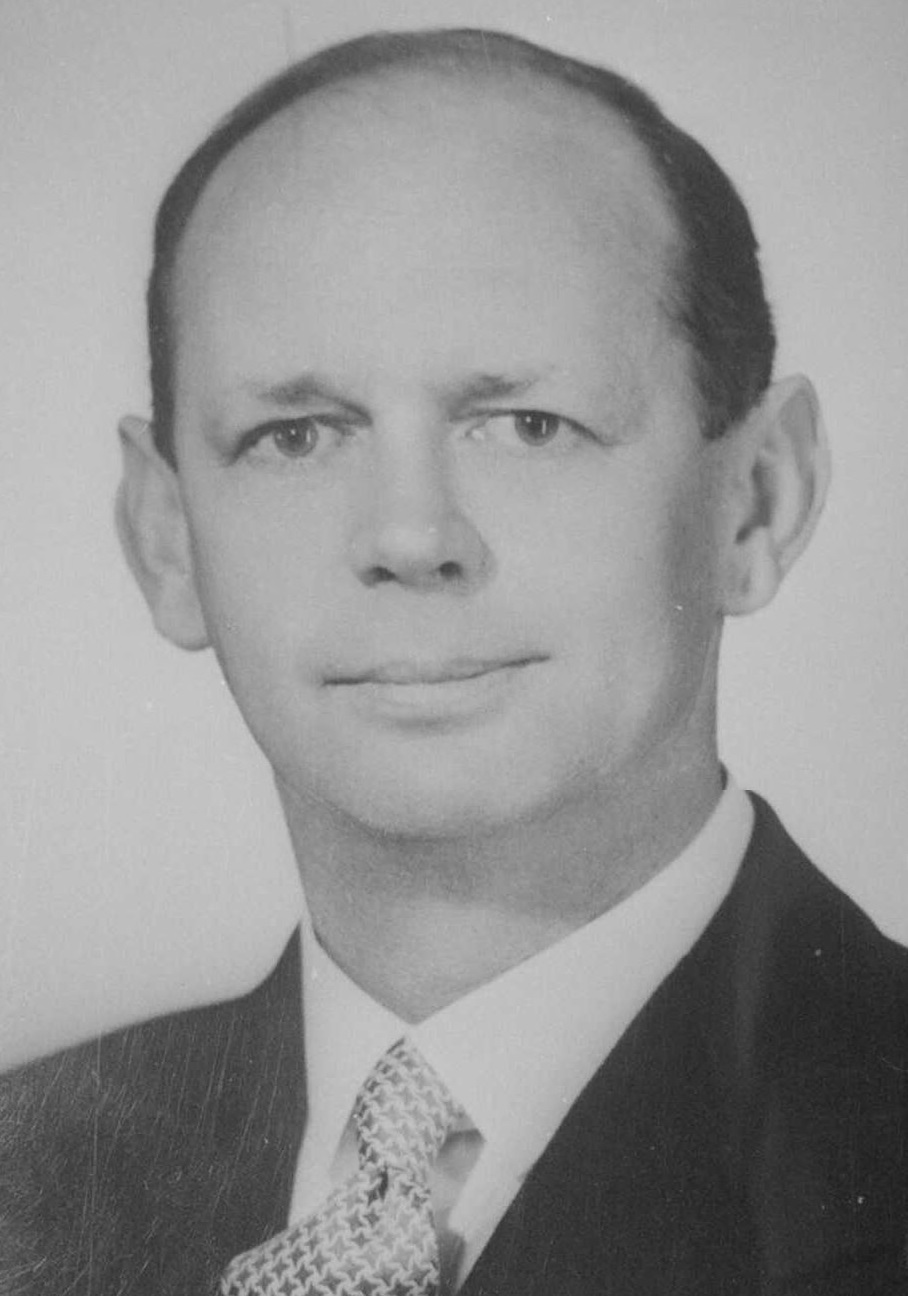

29th Minister of Finance
- In office November 1954 – 12 December 1957
- Prime Minister: Sidney Holland; Keith Holyoake
- Preceded by: Sidney Holland
- Succeeded by: Arnold Nordmeyer

15th Minister of Health
- In office 13 December 1949 – 19 December 1951
- Prime Minister: Sidney Holland
- Preceded by: Mabel Howard
- Succeeded by: Jack Marshall

Member of the New Zealand Parliament for Riccarton
- In office 25 September 1943 – 27 November 1946
- Preceded by: Bert Kyle
- Succeeded by: Angus McLagan

Member of the New Zealand Parliament for St Albans
- In office 27 November 1946 – 30 November 1957
- Preceded by: new constituency
- Succeeded by: Neville Pickering

Member of the New Zealand Parliament for Fendalton
- In office 30 November 1957 – 26 November 1960
- Preceded by: Sidney Holland
- Succeeded by: Harry Lake

Personal details
- Born: 15 April 1909 Palmerston North, New Zealand
- Died: 10 August 1970 (aged 61) Wellington, New Zealand
- Party: National
- Spouse: Gwendolyn Irene Grange
- Children: 5

Jack Thomas Watts (15 April 1909 – 10 August 1970) was a New Zealand politician of the National Party and the twenty-ninth Minister of Finance, from November 1954 to 12 December 1957, when he retired.

== Biography ==
=== Early life and career ===
Watts was born in Palmerston North in 1909. He was educated at Christchurch Boys High School and Canterbury University where he attained a Master of Laws. In 1932 he won the Butterwoth Prize in Law and the Canterbury Law Society Gold Medal. In 1934 he started his own legal practice. In 1937 he married Gwendolyn Irene Grange with whom he had five children.

During World War II Watts served as an officer in the New Zealand Army but did not serve abroad. He was medically discharged from the army in early 1943 due to high blood pressure.

=== Political career ===
New Zealand Parliament
Years	Term	Electorate	Party
1943–1946	27th	Riccarton	National
1946–1949	28th	St Albans	National
1949–1951	29th	St Albans	National
1951–1954	30th	St Albans	National
1954–1957	31st	St Albans	National
1957–1960	32nd	Fendalton	National

He was the Member of Parliament for Riccarton 1943–46, then St Albans 1946–57, then Fendalton 1957–60.

During the First National Government, he was Minister of Health and Minister for Social Security in the first Holland Ministry (1949–54), then Minister of Finance and Minister in Charge of the Census and Statistics Department in the second Holland Ministry (1954–57) and in the first Holyoake Ministry of 1957 (plus Minister in Charge of the Inland Revenue Department).

In 1957 he lost a caucus poll to Jack Marshall for the deputy leadership of the National Party (and consequently the position of Deputy Prime Minister). Watts was bitterly disappointed feeling that he (who held a more prominent portfolio and had been in the House for three years longer) should have been chosen. The result was secret and several cabinet ministers privately speculated that Watts had won, but Holyoake overturned the result. Parliamentary colleagues were concerned with Watts' health which may have counted against him in the ballot. He had been hospitalized after suffering a heart attack shortly before the 1954 election and in 1959 he suffered a thrombosis which blinded him temporarily.

After the Government's defeat in the 1957 election he became National's spokesperson for finance, trade and marketing and ranked third in caucus while National was in opposition. He decided to retire, however, at the 1960 election due to poor health.

In 1953, Watts was awarded the Queen Elizabeth II Coronation Medal.

=== Later life and death ===
After exiting politics he resumed his profession as a legal practitioner and was also a member of the board of directors of several commercial companies.

Watts suffered another heart attack and died in Wellington on 10 August 1970. He was buried at Makara Cemetery.

His son Julian Watts was chairman of the Wellington National Party and stood for National in Western Hutt at the 1972 election, losing to Henry May.

== Notes ==
Political offices
Preceded by Mabel Howard	Minister of Health; 1949–1951	Succeeded by Jack Marshall
Preceded by Charles Bowden	Minister of Industries and Commerce; 1950–1954	Succeeded by Dean Eyre
Preceded by Sidney Holland	Minister of Finance; 1954–1957	Succeeded by Arnold Nordmeyer
New Zealand Parliament
Preceded by Bert Kyle	Member of Parliament for Riccarton; 1943–1946	Succeeded by Angus McLagan
In abeyance Title last held by William Pember Reeves	Member of Parliament for St Albans; 1946–1957	Succeeded by Neville Pickering
Preceded by Sidney Holland	Member of Parliament for Fendalton; 1957–1960	Succeeded by Harry Lake
