= Paddy Kearins =

New Zealand politician

Paddy Kearins MBE
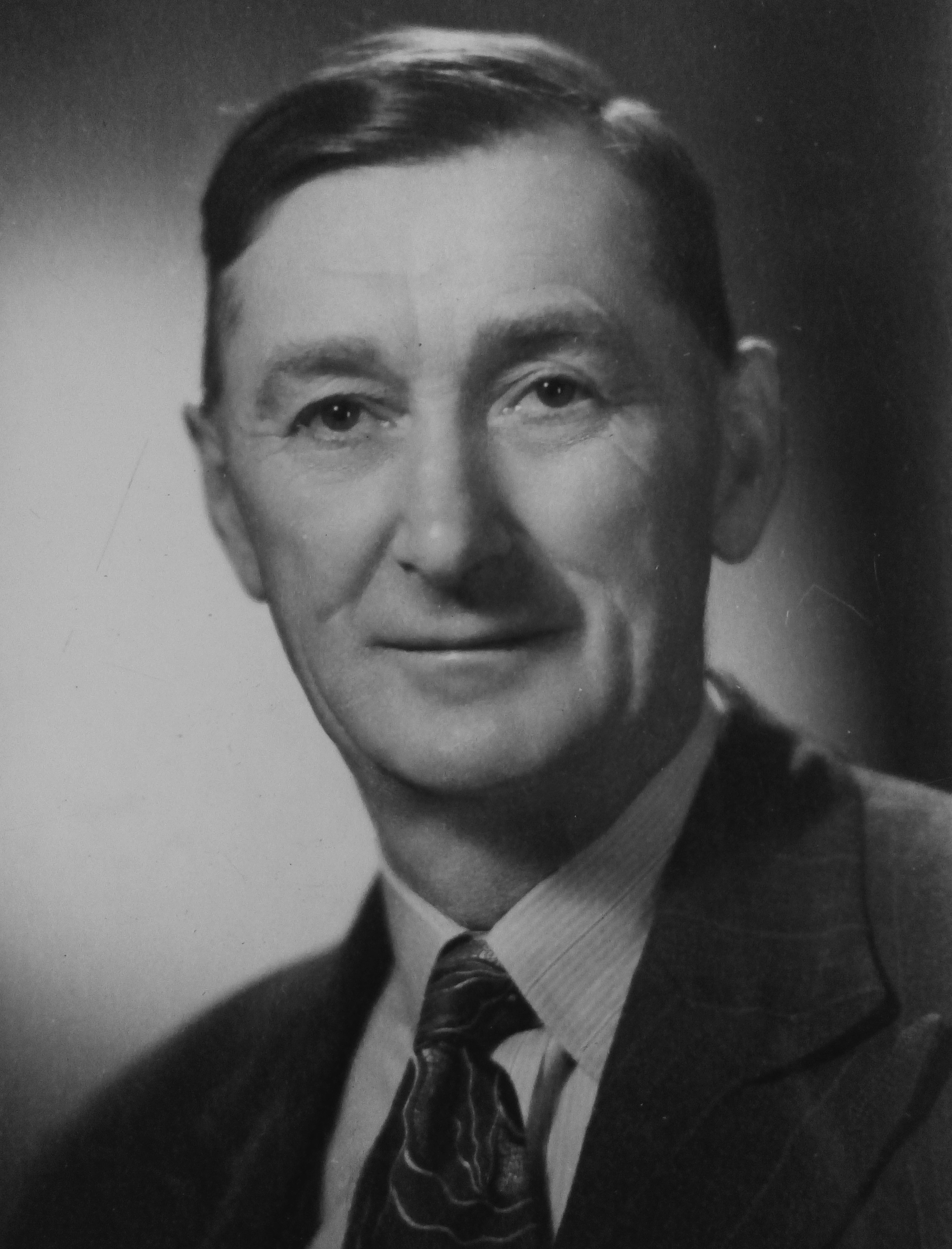

Member of the New Zealand Parliament for Waimarino
- In office 27 November 1946 – 13 November 1954
- Preceded by: Frank Langstone
- Succeeded by: seat abolished

Personal details
- Born: 14 July 1894
- Died: 7 September 1974 (aged 80) Cambridge, New Zealand
- Party: Labour
- Spouse: Kathleen Mary Levett
- Children: 1

Patrick Kearins MBE (14 July 1894 - 7 September 1974) was a Member of Parliament for Waimarino, in the North Island of New Zealand.

== Biography ==
=== Early life and career ===
Kearins was born 14 July 1894 to Patrick Kearins. He became a farmer in Kopaki and in October 1923 he married Kathleen Mary Levett. In 1939 he was appointed a member of the Board of Governors of Massey Agricultural College.

=== Member of Parliament ===
New Zealand Parliament
Years	Term	Electorate	Party
1946–1949	28th	Waimarino	Labour
1949–1951	29th	Waimarino	Labour
1951–1954	30th	Waimarino	Labour

Kearins was the MP for Waimarino in the New Zealand House of Representatives for eight years from 1946 to 1954. Warren Freer described Kearins as a "quiet and sincere" parliamentarian.

In 1947 Kearins was one of three Labour MPs who supported Frank Langstone's contentious proposal that the government make the state-owned Bank of New Zealand the sole legal issuer of bank credit over loans and overdrafts in an attempt to secure state control over the means of exchange. The proposal was rejected as too radical however.

In 1953 Kearins crossed the floor of parliament and voted with the National government to support the Licensing Amendment Bill (No. 2). This Bill proposed that the licensing of the King Country, part of Kearins' electorate, be subject to a referendum.

Later in 1953, following an electoral redistribution, Kearins' electorate of Waimarino was abolished and a new electorate of Rotorua established in its place. Rotorua contained the northern part of his former electorate, including the towns of Taupō (which was previously located in Waimarino), Rotorua, and Tokoroa. However, at the candidate selection for Rotorua, Ray Boord won the nomination and was subsequently elected, and "Labour lost its only farming voice... sacrificed by the party machine".

In 1953, Kearins was awarded the Queen Elizabeth II Coronation Medal.

=== Later life and death ===
Kearins later served as Mayor of Taihape, first elected in 1956. He was awarded the Queen Elizabeth II Coronation Medal in 1953, and was appointed a Member of the Order of the British Empire, for services to local affairs, in the 1970 Queen's Birthday Honours.

He died on 7 September 1974, aged 80. He was survived by his wife and daughter.

== Notes ==
New Zealand Parliament
Preceded by Frank Langstone	Member of Parliament for Waimarino; 1946–1954	Vacant Constituency recreated after abolition in 1954 Title next held by Roy Jack
