= Jimmy Maher (politician) =

New Zealand politician (1888–1964)

James Joseph Maher OBE (1888 – 28 July 1964) was a New Zealand politician of the National Party.

== Life and politics ==
New Zealand Parliament
Years	Term	Electorate	Party
1946–1949	28th	Otaki	National
1949–1951	29th	Otaki	National
1951–1954	30th	Otaki	National
1954–1957	31st	Otaki	National
1957–1960	32nd	Otaki	National

Maher was born in 1888 in Palmerston North. He received his education at a local school until age 12, when his father died and he became a farm worker. He then went sharemilking, and leased a farm at Mangaroa, which he later purchased. He was the inaugural president of the Town Milk Supplies Board from 1943, chaired the Wellington Dairy Farmers Co-op Association, was a member of the Hutt Valley Council, a member of the Hutt Valley Power Board, and was a treasurer of Federated Farmers in 1948.

In the 1943 election, Maher contested the Wairarapa electorate, but was beaten by the incumbent, Labour's Ben Roberts. At the next general election in 1946, he successfully contested the Otaki electorate, where the incumbent, Labour's Leonard Lowry, retired that year. Maher represented the electorate until he retired in 1960. Allan McCready his son-in-law succeeded to the Otaki seat.

In 1953, Maher was awarded the Queen Elizabeth II Coronation Medal. In the 1962 Queen's Birthday Honours, he was appointed an Officer of the Order of the British Empire, for services to the community. He died on 28 July 1964.
