= Stan Goosman =

New Zealand politician

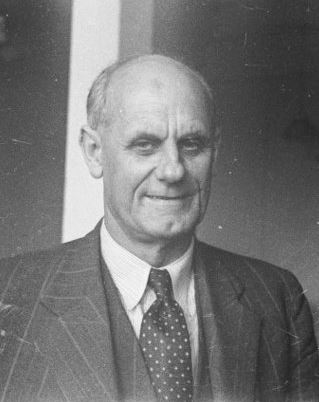
Goosman in 1950

Sir William Stanley Goosman KCMG (2 July 1890 – 10 June 1969) was a New Zealand politician of the National Party and a road-haulier and contractor.

== Biography ==
New Zealand Parliament
Years	Term	Electorate	Party
1938–1943	26th	Waikato	National
1943–1946	27th	Waikato	National
1946–1949	28th	Piako	National
1949–1951	29th	Piako	National
1951–1954	30th	Piako	National
1954–1957	31st	Waipa	National
1957–1960	32nd	Piako	National
1960–1963	33rd	Piako	National

Goosman was born in 1890 at Auckland. William Massey was his uncle. He received his education at Māngere and at the age of 13, he started work on a dairy farm. At age 17, he went to Gisborne and worked in the bush. During the Great Depression, he started a transport business at Waihou, near Te Aroha, which grew into a large company. He was also a roading contractor.

He was the Member of Parliament for Waikato 1938–1946, Piako 1946–1954, Waipa 1954–1957, then Piako again 1957–1963, when he retired. When defending the government during the 1951 waterfront lockout, he said, "All I have to say is that if Hitler had to deal with the same thing Hitler talked right."

He was the Minister of Works, Minister of Transport, Minister of Marine, Minister of Housing and Minister of Railways in the First National Government from 1949 to 1954. In those roles, he decided to drop proposals to improve Auckland's rail network and instead focus on motorway building. When opening the first of Auckland's motorways in 1953, he is reported to have said, "My boy, the future of Auckland is with the motor car". One of his first actions as Railway Minister was to raise charges and fares.

Despite carrying six ministerial portfolios in the First National Government, when the Second National Government was formed in 1960 he was offered only the Works portfolio causing him to protest to Keith Holyoake and Jack Marshall (who had concerns about his age at 70) and offered to retire which they dissuaded him from doing. He interpreted it as a vote of no confidence in his abilities and claimed he still had the energy of a much younger man, to settle the issue he was additionally appointed as Minister of Electricity to his satisfaction.

In 1953, Goosman was awarded the Queen Elizabeth II Coronation Medal. In the 1965 Queen's Birthday Honours, he was appointed a Knight Commander of the Order of St Michael and St George, for political and public services. The Stanley Goosman Bridge over the Taramakau River near Jacksons carries his name.

In 2025 Goosman was inducted into the New Zealand Racing Hall of Fame.

== Notes ==
Political offices
Preceded by Bob Semple	Minister of Railways; 1949–1954	Succeeded by John McAlpine
New Zealand Parliament
Preceded by Robert Coulter	Member of Parliament for Waikato; 1938–1946	Succeeded by Geoffrey Sim
New constituency	Member of Parliament for Piako; 1946–1954 1957–1963	Vacant Constituency abolished, recreated in 1957 Title next held by himself
Vacant Constituency recreated after abolition in 1954 Title last held by himself	Member of Parliament for Piako; 1946–1954 1957–1963	Succeeded by Geoffrey Sim
Vacant Constituency recreated after abolition in 1896 Title last held by Frederic Lang	Member of Parliament for Waipa; 1954–1957	Succeeded by Hallyburton Johnstone
