= David Murdoch (politician) =

New Zealand politician (1887–1960)

The Honourable David Murdoch

Member of the New Zealand Legislative Council
- In office 22 June 1950 – 31 December 1950

Personal details
- Born: 23 January 1887 Ngapara, New Zealand
- Died: 10 June 1960 (aged 73) Dunedin, New Zealand
- Spouse: Rebecca Espie (m. 1917)

David Murdoch (23 January 1887 – 10 June 1960) was a New Zealand farmer, storekeeper and politician. He was appointed a member of the New Zealand Legislative Council on 22 June 1950.

== Biography ==
Born at Ngapara in North Otago on 23 January 1887, Murdoch was the son of Alexander Murdoch and Alice Hunter Murdoch (née Howden).

Murdoch took up farming, and was a sheep farmer at Waitahuna for many years, serving as president of the Waitahuna Agricultural and Pastoral Society and on local branch committees of the New Zealand Farmers' Union. Prior to becoming politically active, he was best known as a judge at sheep dog trials. In the 1930s, he became a storekeeper at Brighton, south of Dunedin, where he remained for 15 years, and served as president of the local football and bowling clubs.

Murdoch was the National candidate in the Dunedin South electorate in 1943 and in Dunedin Central electorate in 1949, but was unsuccessful on both occasions. He stood for selection in the St Kilda electorate for the 1946 but lost to Leonard James Ireland. He served as the chair of the Otago–Southland division of the National Party. In 1950, he was appointed to the Legislative Council as a member of the suicide squad nominated by the First National Government to vote for the abolition of the council. Most of the new members (like Murdoch) were appointed on 22 June 1950, and served until 31 December 1950 when the council was abolished.

== Family ==
On 5 April 1917, Murdoch married Reba Rebecca Golden Muir Espie, and the couple went on to have three sons. Murdoch died in Dunedin on 10 June 1960. His wife died a few months later, on 1 December the same year.
