= Alan Baxter (politician) =

New Zealand politician

Alan Baxter DFC*

Member of the New Zealand Parliament for Raglan
- In office 27 November 1946 – 30 November 1949
- Preceded by: Hallyburton Johnstone
- Succeeded by: Hallyburton Johnstone

Personal details
- Born: 19 August 1911 Egmont Village, New Zealand
- Died: 14 July 1976 (aged 64) Auckland, New Zealand
- Party: Labour
- Spouse: Sylvia
- Children: 3
- Awards: DFC and bar

Military service
- Branch/service: Royal New Zealand Air Force
- Years of service: 1940–45
- Rank: Flight Lieutenant
- Battles/wars: World War II

Alan Cheyne Baxter (19 August 1911 – 14 July 1976) was a New Zealand politician of the Labour Party.

== Biography ==
=== Early life and career ===
Baxter was born on 19 August 1911 at Egmont Village. He gained his education at New Plymouth Boys' High School and subsequently at Feilding Agricultural College. Before the war, Baxter was a shepherd in the Wairarapa. While living there he joined the trade union movement in 1939.

He joined the Royal New Zealand Air Force (RNZAF) in March 1940 and was a flight lieutenant. He was awarded the DFC in October 1942 for his actions in the Dieppe Raid, with a Bar awarded in 1945. The citation for the 1942 award read:

On August 19th, 1942, he was observer in the leading aircraft of a formation which participated in the combined operations at Dieppe. When the formation was attacked by some 20 enemy fighters, Pilot Officer Baxter calmly gave directions to his captain, and subsequently his skilful navigation was an essential contribution to the success achieved by the formation and to its safe return to base.

According to one of his navigators, he flew more bombing missions over Germany than any other New Zealand airman (and came back alive). During one period of raids, he lost seven roommates in five days. One personal escape involved bending over to pick up a map, with a shot of flak shooting through the seat where he had been sitting only a moment before. On the bombing of Germany, he stated it was something that had to be done to stop Hitler, but every time they were let go, he felt for "the poor blighters below".

Following the war he settled first on Ōtorohanga, then in Huntly. Baxter worked as clerk with seed and fertiliser merchants for two years in Feilding and Hāwera. He later became a prominent member of a movement to increase living standards of rural employees.

=== Political career ===
New Zealand Parliament
Years	Term	Electorate	Party
1946–1949	28th	Raglan	Labour

Baxter contested the 1946 by-election in the Raglan electorate for the Labour Party, but lost against Hallyburton Johnstone of the National Party. Later in the same year, Baxter defeated Johnstone in the 1946 general election by just 13 votes. Johnstone in turn defeated Baxter in 1949. Baxter later stood unsuccessfully for Raglan in the 1957 and 1960 elections. He was the last Labour candidate to win a seat in the area.

A notable characteristic of his parliamentary period was that he was respected as a man who never compromised his principles.

=== Later life and death ===
After he lost his seat in Parliament he worked in the coal mines in Huntly. In 1962 he retired and moved to Auckland.

Baxter died in 1976 after a short illness. He was survived by his wife Sylvia and three daughters.

== Notes ==
New Zealand Parliament
Preceded by Hallyburton Johnstone	Member of Parliament for Raglan; 1946–1949	Succeeded by Hallyburton Johnstone
