= 1946 Raglan by-election =

New Zealand by-election

The 1946 Raglan by-election was a by-election held in the Raglan electorate on 5 March 1946 during the term of the 27th New Zealand Parliament. The by-election was caused by the death of Labour Party representative Robert Coulter, and was won by Hallyburton Johnstone of the National Party in a close result.

== Background ==
The electorate Raglan was a mixture of rural and urban areas, and known as quite marginal. Rural households in the electorate were often quite remote, and this remoteness could swing the results of the election to the party with better campaigners.

The by-election was caused by the death of Labour MP Robert Coulter on 31 December 1945. Coulter had been elected twice in rural electorates that usually returned United or National MPs, having previously been MP for Waikato.

== Campaign ==
The campaign for Raglan was tightly fought, and it was believed that the result of the by-election could be a pointer to the results of the general election later that year. In addition to the candidates, politicians of high authority on both sides campaigned throughout the electorate in the interest of canvassing more voters. One of those figures was prime minister Peter Fraser.

== Results ==
The provisional results were compiled on the day of the election and had Johnstone leading Baxter by 194 votes. 378 absentee ballots and 152 postal votes were missing from this provisional count.

1946 Raglan by-election
Party	Candidate	Votes	%	±%
National	Hallyburton Johnstone	5,044	51.57	
Labour	Alan Baxter	4,735	48.43	
Majority		309	3.15	
Turnout		9,779	67.67	
Registered electors		14,451		

The full results of the election had come in by 13 March and suggested a win by Johnstone with a majority of 308 votes. The final outcome was decided by the electoral court.

== Aftermath ==
Labour stayed in office in the general election later that year, albeit by a decreased margin. The same two candidates Johnstone and Baxter competed at Raglan, Baxter commanding a lead of just 39 votes at the final count, a loss of 6 votes from the preliminary count. Two further rulings going well into 1947 culminated in Baxter's majority been reduced to a mere 13 votes.

1946 general election: Raglan
Party	Candidate	Votes	%	±%
Labour	Alan Baxter	6,821	49.17	+0.74
National	Hallyburton Johnstone	6,808	49.08	−2.49
Informal votes		241	1.73	
Majority		13	0.09	
Turnout		13,870		
