= John McAlpine =

New Zealand politician

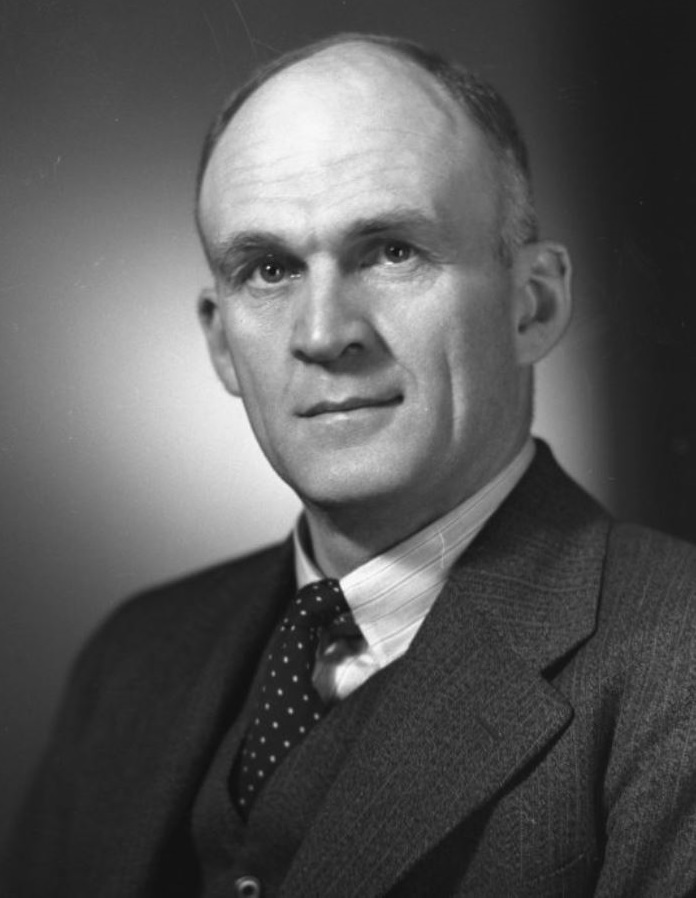
McAlpine circa 1960s

Sir John Kenneth McAlpine KCMG (21 July 1906 – 11 January 1984) was a New Zealand politician of the National Party. He was the Member of Parliament for Selwyn from 1946 to 1966, when he retired.

== Biography ==
New Zealand Parliament
Years	Term	Electorate	Party
1946–1949	28th	Selwyn	National
1949–1951	29th	Selwyn	National
1951–1954	30th	Selwyn	National
1954–1957	31st	Selwyn	National
1957–1960	32nd	Selwyn	National
1960–1963	33rd	Selwyn	National
1963–1966	34th	Selwyn	National

McAlpine was born in Christchurch in 1906, the son of a sheepfarmer – Walter Kenneth McAlpine. He received his education at Christ's College in Christchurch. After school, he worked at his father's high-country station at Craigieburn, New Zealand in the Southern Alps east of Arthur's Pass. He became the manager of that station in 1929 and later lived at Spye, a locality in North Canterbury near Omihi, where his father had farmed. McAlpine married Lesley Hay in 1935; she was a descendant of Ebenezer Hay of Pigeon Bay who was the earliest white settler in Canterbury.

McAlpine Sr was chairman of the Lyttelton Harbour Board when he died in July 1937. Another member of the harbour board, James Leslie, died in September 1937. McAlpine Jr was one of two government-appointees to fill those vacancies and he attended his first meeting on 1 November 1937. On 2 June 1943, McAlpine Jr was voted chairman of the harbour board. He served two one-year terms and was succeeded by his deputy, Bill MacGibbon, on 6 June 1945.

In 1953, McAlpine was awarded the Queen Elizabeth II Coronation Medal.

He was Minister of Railways in the First National Government from 1954 to 1957. In the Second National Government from 1960 to 1966 he was Minister of Railways and Minister of Transport. In the 1970 Queen's Birthday Honours, he was appointed a Companion of the Order of St Michael and St George, for services to politics, and in the 1977 New Year Honours he was promoted to Knight Commander of the Order of St Michael and St George, for public services, especially as chairman of the New Zealand Ports Authority from 1969 to 1977.

Political offices
Preceded by Stan Goosman	Minister of Railways; 1954–1957; 1960–1966	Succeeded by Mick Moohan
Preceded by Mick Moohan	Minister of Railways; 1954–1957; 1960–1966	Succeeded by Peter Gordon
New Zealand Parliament
In abeyance Title last held by William Dickie	Member of Parliament for Selwyn; 1946–1966	Succeeded by Colin McLachlan
Political offices
Preceded by Humphrey Holderness	Chairman of the Lyttelton Harbour Board; 1943–1945	Succeeded by Bill MacGibbon
