= Robert Coulter (New Zealand politician) =

New Zealand politician

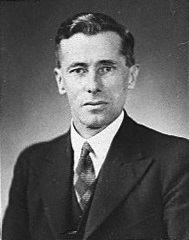

Member of the New Zealand Parliament for Raglan
- In office 25 September 1943 – 31 December 1945
- Preceded by: Lee Martin
- Succeeded by: Hallyburton Johnstone

Member of the New Zealand Parliament for Waikato
- In office 27 November 1935 – 15 October 1938
- Preceded by: Frederick Lye
- Succeeded by: Stan Goosman

Personal details
- Born: 1891 Christchurch, New Zealand
- Died: 31 December 1945 (aged 54) Timaru, New Zealand
- Party: Labour
- Other political affiliations: Liberal

Robert Coulter (1891 – 31 December 1945) was a New Zealand politician of the Labour Party.

== Biography ==
=== Early life and career ===
Robert Coulter was reported to have been born in 1891 in Christchurch and went to Woodend Public School. However, a Robert Coulter gained a prize in Standard 2 at Woodend District School in 1894. Children at that time had to attend school from age 7 to 13. Possibly he showed early talent and/or was born before 1891. He had a brother, J. J. Coulter and a sister, who lived in either Wellington, or Timaru. He never married.

After primary education he worked in farming, lived about two years in Wellington and moved to Auckland.

In 1904 Robert Coulter settled in Te Aroha, to be a grocer and auctioneer, and was a member of Te Aroha Borough Council from May 1916. In 1915 he defended not being a volunteer for service in World War I, but in 1917 he was conscripted into the forces, though he was given exemptions twice. He went to camp in May 1917 with the 29th Reinforcement. They reached France in October 1917, but it seems Coulter was back by March 1918.

=== Political career ===
New Zealand Parliament
Years	Term	Electorate	Party
1935–1938	25th	Waikato	Labour
1943–1945	27th	Raglan	Labour

In October 1918, he was re-elected to the council, becoming Mayor in April 1921. He was also president of Te Aroha Chamber of Commerce and Te Aroha Aero Club and associated for a number of years with the Northern Athletic Union, Thames Harbour Board and Te Aroha Fire Board.

He stood for Tauranga in the 1925 election. He announced his candidacy in June 1925 as a Liberal–Labour candidate. By the election campaign in October he had been adopted as the official candidate of the Liberal Party and had also been endorsed by the Country Party. He was defeated by the incumbent MP Charles Macmillan of the Reform Party. During the election he was widely quoted for comments he made at an election meeting in Te Aroha where he called Reform's leader Gordon Coates as a "good sort" and a "straight goer". Reform friendly newspapers were eager to report such praise from a political opponent.

He won the Waikato electorate in 1935 election as the Labour Party candidate, but, with rearrangement of boundaries, was defeated in Hauraki in 1938 by Lieutenant- Colonel J. M. Allen. during which time represented the Waikato electorate from 1935 to 1938, when he was defeated by National's Stan Goosman. In 1941 he was defeated as Te Aroha's mayor by Laurie Mackie. He then moved his residence to Hamilton, as he was selected to stand in Raglan, in succession to Lee Martin, who was retiring due to ill health. The 1941 election was cancelled, so it was not until 1943 that he was elected for Raglan. Coulter was something of a political anomaly, being elected twice in rural electorates that usually returned Reform or National MPs.

=== Death and commemoration ===
By mid-1945 Coulter was in indifferent health for many months and had an undisclosed operation in Wellington. Afterwards, he went to stay with relatives in Timaru for recuperation. While staying there his condition worsened to the point he had to enter Timaru hospital. He died there on 31 December 1945. His funeral was in Wellington. He was succeeded by Hallyburton Johnstone of National at a 1946 by-election.

Coulter Bridge, which carries SH26 over the Waihou River, in Te Aroha, was built in 1928 and named after him.

== Notes ==
New Zealand Parliament
Preceded by Frederick Lye	Member of Parliament for Waikato; 1935–1938	Succeeded by Stan Goosman
Preceded by Lee Martin	Member of Parliament for Raglan; 1943–1945	Succeeded by Hallyburton Johnstone
