= David Coleman (New Zealand politician) =

New Zealand politician

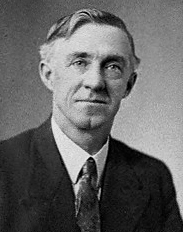

Member of the New Zealand Parliament for Gisborne
- In office 2 December 1931 – 30 November 1949
- Preceded by: Douglas Lysnar
- Succeeded by: Reginald Keeling

Personal details
- Born: 1881 London, England
- Died: 13 March 1951 (aged 69) Gisborne, New Zealand
- Party: Labour (1919–51); Social Democratic (1914–19)
- Spouse: Julia Jane Bigwood
- Children: 2

David William Coleman (1881 – 13 March 1951) was a New Zealand politician of the Labour Party.

== Biography ==
=== Early life ===
He was born in London in 1881, and lived as a child and young man in Queensland. He worked as a carpenter and later as a furniture salesman. He joined the local debating society and maintained an interest in the vocation for the rest of his life.

In 1902, aged 21, he emigrated to New Zealand and first lived in Wellington, before moving to Gisborne where he established his own retail business. In 1904 he married Julia Jane Bigwood and had two children.

=== Political career ===
New Zealand Parliament
Years	Term	Electorate	Party
1931–1935	24th	Gisborne	Labour
1935–1938	25th	Gisborne	Labour
1938–1943	26th	Gisborne	Labour
1943–1946	27th	Gisborne	Labour
1946–1949	28th	Gisborne	Labour

Coleman became secretary of the Poverty Bay Labourers' Union and then became secretary of the Gisborne branch of the Social Democratic Party (SDP). Coleman supported the merger of the SDP into the New Zealand Labour Party and was on the Labour Party's first national executive, serving on it and the Gisborne LRC for twenty-one years.

He was Mayor of Gisborne for two separate spells, from 1927–33 and 1935–41. He was likewise a member of the Cook Hospital Board, Poverty Bay Power Board and Gisborne Fire Board.

He represented the Gisborne electorate from 1931, having stood unsuccessfully in the 1925 election and the 1928 election. He retired in 1949 owing to ill health.

From 1942 until 1947 he was the Labour Party's junior whip. Coleman was then Parliamentary Under-Secretary to the Minister of Works from 1947 to 1949.

=== Later life and death ===
In 1935, he was awarded the King George V Silver Jubilee Medal.

Coleman died on 13 March 1951, aged 69, survived by his second wife, son and daughter. He was buried at Taruheru Cemetery, Gisborne. He had been predeceased by his wife, Julia Jane Coleman, in 1941.

== Notes ==
New Zealand Parliament
Preceded by Douglas Lysnar	Member of Parliament for Gisborne; 1931–1949	Succeeded by Reginald Keeling
