= Ernest Corbett =

New Zealand politician

The Honourable Ernest Corbett
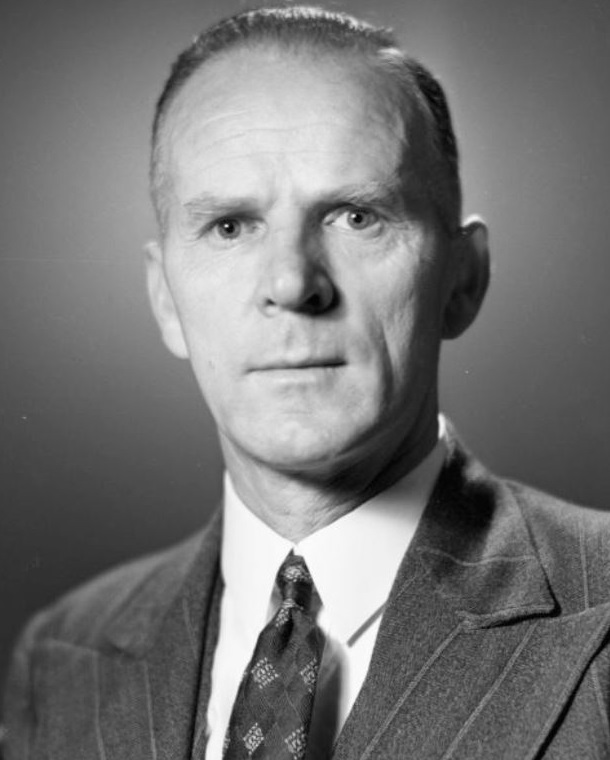

27th Minister of Māori Affairs
- In office 13 December 1949 – 26 September 1957
- Prime Minister: Sidney Holland; Keith Holyoake
- Preceded by: Peter Fraser
- Succeeded by: Keith Holyoake

Member of the New Zealand Parliament for Egmont
- In office 25 September 1943 – 26 September 1957
- Preceded by: Charles Wilkinson
- Succeeded by: William Sheat

Personal details
- Born: 7 May 1898 Ōkato, New Zealand
- Died: 15 June 1968 (aged 70) New Plymouth, New Zealand
- Party: National
- Spouse: Doris Eileen Sharp (m. 1923)
- Children: Two sons

Ernest Bowyer Corbett (7 May 1898 – 15 June 1968) was a New Zealand National Party politician.

== Early life and family ==
Corbett was born in Ōkato in 1898; his father was William Corbett. His mother was descended from Thomas Hansen, who had come to New Zealand with Samuel Marsden in 1814 in the brig Active. He received his education at Puniho pa and at Okato state school. In 1922, he married Doris E. Sharp, the daughter of A. Sharp. He worked for the Post and Telegraph Department for six years, followed by four years in a dairy factory, and then as a dairy farmer.

== Public offices ==
New Zealand Parliament
Years	Term	Electorate	Party
1943–1946	27th	Egmont	National
1946–1949	28th	Egmont	National
1949–1951	29th	Egmont	National
1951–1954	30th	Egmont	National
1954–1957	31st	Egmont	National

Corbett was the director of the National Dairy Association for six years. He was with the Oxford Dairy Company for 26 years and the Dairy Insurance Company for 12 years. For 12 years, he was a warden for the Church of England.

Corbett held the Egmont electorate from 1943 to 1957. He was Minister of Māori Affairs, Minister of Lands and Minister of Forests in the First National Government. As Māori Affairs Minister he worked closely with Māori statesman Āpirana Ngata, and spent much of his time implementing "Ngata’s policies". In 1953, Corbett was awarded the Queen Elizabeth II Coronation Medal.

Corbett had a deep affection for the natural environment and was an honorary ranger for Egmont National Park. He was made a life member of the Royal Forest and Bird Protection Society of New Zealand. During his time as a cabinet minister, the National Parks Act 1952 was passed. During his time in office, some 1,200,000 acres (490,000 ha) were added to national parks. For his contributions, he was awarded the Loder Cup in 1958, an award given to those who have made "contributions to plant conservation work in New Zealand".

Corbett fell ill and, according to Wilson (1985), retired at the end of the parliamentary term on 29 October 1957, or, according to his biographer, in September 1957, shortly before his government's defeat. He died on 15 June 1968.

In April 2010 it was alleged by Muru Walters that in 1956 Corbett told the Māori All Blacks to deliberately lose to the Springboks "for the future of rugby"; however, several other players in the team contradict Walters' accusation and state Corbett never asked them to deliberately throw the game. The Māori team lost 37–0. This was followed by Walters calling for the government to apologise for the way it treated Māori rugby players.

As Minister he promoted the Māori Purposes Act 1950, which allowed land to be leased compulsorily and sold for arrears of rates. He wrote to Raglan County Council that, "I am firmly of the opinion that if other County Councils take advantage of the provisions of the Act, as your Council is doing, the problem of idle and unproductive Māori land will soon be on its way to a complete solution". Raglan, Kāwhia, and Waitomo councils had orders enforced on 20,615 acres (8,343 ha) of Māori land. The popular left hand break surf access at Waikeri (Manu Bay) was among areas with rate arrears sold to Raglan County Council.

== Notes ==
New Zealand Parliament
Preceded by Charles Wilkinson	Member of Parliament for Egmont; 1943–1957	Succeeded by William Sheat
Political offices
Preceded by Peter Fraser	Minister of Māori Affairs; 1949–1957	Succeeded by Keith Holyoake
