= Hallyburton Johnstone =

New Zealand politician

Hallyburton Johnstone OBE (23 August 1897 – 10 August 1970) was a New Zealand politician of the National Party.

== Biography ==
New Zealand Parliament
Years	Term	Electorate	Party
1946	27th	Raglan	National
1949–1951	29th	Raglan	National
1951–1954	30th	Raglan	National
1954–1957	31st	Raglan	National
1957–1960	32nd	Waipa	National
1960–1963	33rd	Waipa	National

Johnstone was born in Raglan in 1897, the son of Campbell Johnstone. He was educated at Te Uku, Whata Whata, and Auckland Grammar School. He served in the NZEF from 1916 to 1918. In 1920, he married Gladys R. Morris, with whom he was to have three sons. He farmed sheep and cattle in the Raglan area.

He won the Raglan electorate in 1946 in the by-election caused by the death of the previous MP, Robert Coulter. However, he only held the electorate from 5 March to 27 November 1946 as he was defeated by Alan Baxter in the 1946 general election.

In 1949 he won Raglan back for National, and held it to 1957 when he instead contested and won the Waipa electorate. He held this seat until his retirement in 1963.

In 1953, Johnstone was awarded the Queen Elizabeth II Coronation Medal. In the 1966 New Year Honours, he was appointed an Officer of the Order of the British Empire, for services to farming and in political life.

New Zealand Parliament
Preceded by Robert Coulter	Member of Parliament for Raglan; 1946; 1949–1957	Succeeded by Alan Baxter
Preceded by Alan Baxter	Member of Parliament for Raglan; 1946; 1949–1957	Succeeded by Douglas Carter
Preceded by Stan Goosman	Member of Parliament for Waipa; 1957–1963	Succeeded by Leslie Munro
