= Hoeroa Marumaru =

New Zealand politician (1890–1952)

Hoeroa Taraua Utiku Marumaru (1890–1952) was a prominent figure in the Anglican Church and in the National Party, where he was Māori vice-president between 1945 and 1948 as well as in 1952. He was born in Parewanui, and educated at Te Aute College.

Marumaru was appointed a member of the New Zealand Legislative Council on 22 June 1950, and was one of the members of the suicide squad appointed by the First National Government to vote for its abolition. He was appointed because the previous Māori member Sir Āpirana Ngata had died soon after being appointed (and before he could be sworn in).

Marumaru was a dairy and sheep farmer from Bulls, and on the Wanganui County Council. He unsuccessfully contested the Western Maori electorate in the 1946, 1949 and 1951 elections.
