= Raglan (electorate) =

Raglan is a former New Zealand parliamentary electorate. It existed for three periods between 1861 and 1996 and during that time, it was represented by 13 Members of Parliament.

== Population centres ==
In the 1860 electoral redistribution, the House of Representatives increased the number of representatives by 12, reflecting the immense population growth since the original electorates were established in 1853. The redistribution created 15 additional electorates with between one and three members, and Raglan was one of the single-member electorates. It was created by splitting the Southern Division electorate into two areas, and the eastern part was called Franklin, while the western part was called Raglan. The electorates were distributed to provinces so that every province had at least two members. Within each province, the number of registered electors by electorate varied greatly. The Raglan electorate had 482 registered electors for the 1861 election. In 1861 it was named Raglan, but that town had the only polling station between the southern boundary of the Mokau River and Waiuku, the majority being in the Auckland suburbs. The northern boundary was close to the centre of Auckland, bordering on Newton District. The southern boundary was the Mokau River and the eastern, the Great South Road.

The Raglan electorate was on the West coast of the Waikato region, and was based on the small town of Raglan.

In the 1911 electoral redistribution, the North Island gained a further seat from the South Island due to faster population growth. In addition, there were substantial population movements within each island, and significant changes resulted from this. Only four electorates were unaltered, five electorates were abolished, one former electorate was re-established (Raglan), and four electorates were created for the first time. Raglan was created by the Franklin electorate moving north, and the Waikato electorate moving south.

The 1981 census had shown that the North Island had experienced further population growth, and three additional general seats were created through the 1983 electoral redistribution, bringing the total number of electorates to 95. The South Island had, for the first time, experienced a population loss, but its number of general electorates was fixed at 25 since the 1967 electoral redistribution. More of the South Island population was moving to Christchurch, and two electorates were abolished, while two electorates were recreated. In the North Island, six electorates were newly created, three electorates were recreated (including Raglan), and six electorates were abolished.

== History ==
The Raglan electorate existed from 1860 to 1870, from 1911 to 1978, and then from 1984 to 1996. The first election was held on 11 February 1861 and was won by Charles John Taylor, who had previously represented the Southern Division electorate.

In 1996, Simon Upton who was then the MP for Raglan chose to become a list MP. He resigned in 2001.

=== Members of Parliament ===
The Raglan electorate was represented by 13 Members of Parliament.

Key

Independent Reform Labour National

Election	Winner
1861 election	Charles John Taylor
1865 by-election	William Buckland
1866 election	Joseph Newman
1867 by-election	James Farmer
(Abolished 1870–1911; see Waikato and Franklin)
1911 election	Richard Bollard
1914 election	Richard Bollard
1919 election	Richard Bollard
1922 election	Richard Bollard
1925 election	Richard Bollard
1927 by-election	Lee Martin
1928 election	Lee Martin
1931 election	Stewart Reid
1935 election	Lee Martin (2nd period)
1938 election	Lee Martin (2nd period)
1943 election	Robert Coulter
1946 by-election	Hallyburton Johnstone
1946 election	Alan Baxter
1949 election	Hallyburton Johnstone (2nd period)
1951 election	Hallyburton Johnstone (2nd period)
1954 election	Hallyburton Johnstone (2nd period)
1957 election	Douglas Carter
1960 election	Douglas Carter
1963 election	Douglas Carter
1966 election	Douglas Carter
1969 election	Douglas Carter
1972 election	Douglas Carter
1975 election	Marilyn Waring
(Abolished 1978–1984)
1984 election	Simon Upton
1987 election	Simon Upton
1990 election	Simon Upton
1993 election	Simon Upton
(Electorate abolished in 1996; see Port Waikato)

== Election results ==
=== 1946 election ===
1946 general election: Raglan
Party	Candidate	Votes	%	±%
Labour	Alan Baxter	6,821	49.17	+0.74
National	Hallyburton Johnstone	6,808	49.08	−2.49
Informal votes		241	1.73	
Majority		13	0.09	
Turnout		13,870		

In an electoral court ruling Baxter gained 2 votes while losing 83, while Johnstone lost 61 votes from the original result.

=== 1946 by-election ===
1946 Raglan by-election
Party	Candidate	Votes	%	±%
National	Hallyburton Johnstone	5,044	51.57	
Labour	Alan Baxter	4,735	48.43	
Majority		309	3.15	
Turnout		9,779	67.67	
Registered electors		14,451		

=== 1943 election ===
1943 general election: Raglan
Party	Candidate	Votes	%	±%
Labour	Robert Coulter	4,817	47.99	
National	Robert James Glasgow	4,709	46.92	
Democratic Labour	Alwyn Temple Dillon	289	2.87	
Real Democracy	Stanley Burton	221	2.20	
Informal votes		90	0.89	
Majority		108	1.07	
Turnout		10,036		

=== 1938 election ===
1938 general election: Raglan
Party	Candidate	Votes	%	±%
Labour	Lee Martin	5,062	52.54	
National	Andy Sutherland	4,458	46.27	
Country Party	Albert James Gallichan	115	1.19	
Majority		604	6.27	
Informal votes		95	0.98	
Turnout		9,730	92.40	
Registered electors		10,530		

=== 1935 election ===
1935 general election: Raglan
Party	Candidate	Votes	%	±%
Labour	Lee Martin	5,148	55.48	+10.81
Reform	Stewart Reid	3,453	37.21	−18.12
Democrat	J H Potter	581	6.26	
Independent	H Hampton	96	1.03	
Informal votes		97	1.04	+0.37
Majority		1,695	18.26	
Turnout		9,278	89.78	+9.38
Registered electors		10,334		

=== 1931 election ===
1931 general election: Raglan
Party	Candidate	Votes	%	±%
Reform	Stewart Reid	4,180	55.33	
Labour	Lee Martin	3,374	44.67	
Majority		806	10.67	
Informal votes		51	0.67	
Turnout		7,605	80.40	
Registered electors		9,459		

=== 1928 election ===
1928 general election: Raglan
Party	Candidate	Votes	%	±%
Labour	Lee Martin	4,206	55.44	
Reform	Walter Seavill	3,165	41.72	
Independent Reform	William Brown	216	2.85	
Majority		1,041	13.72	
Informal votes		113	1.47	
Turnout		7,700	86.38	
Registered electors		8,914		

=== 1927 by-election ===
1927 Raglan by-election
Party	Candidate	Votes	%	±%
Labour	Lee Martin	2,200	36.36	
Reform	Harry Waring	2,025	33.47	
Liberal	Thomas Parker	1,095	18.09	
Country Party	Cornelius Augustus Magner	532	8.79	
Independent	William James Taylor	198	3.27	
Informal votes		97	1.53	−0.77
Majority		175	2.89	
Turnout		6,050	98.47	+8.61
Registered electors		6,147		
Labour gain from Reform		Swing		

Waring (Reform) was the great-grandfather of Marilyn Waring.

=== 1925 election ===
1925 general election: Raglan
Party	Candidate	Votes	%	±%
Reform	Richard Bollard	4,470	61.48	
Labour	Ernest Piggott	1,614	22.20	
Liberal	Samuel Charles Gale Lye	965	13.27	
Country Party	Robert Dickinson Duxfield	222	3.05	
Majority		2,856	39.28	
Informal votes		56	0.76	
Turnout		7,327	89.86	
Registered electors		8,154		

=== 1922 election ===
1922 general election:
Party	Candidate	Votes	%	±%
Reform	Richard Bollard	3,494		
Liberal	Samuel Charles Gale Lye	2,718		
Labour	E. Piggott	99		
Majority		776		
Informal votes		139		
Turnout				
Registered electors				

=== 1919 election ===
1914 general election
Party	Candidate	Votes	%	±%
Reform	Richard Bollard	2,888		
Independent	Campbell Johnstone	756		
Labour	Bill Jordan	1,900		
Majority		988		
Informal votes		64		
Turnout		5,608		
Registered electors				

=== 1914 election ===
1914 general election
Party	Candidate	Votes	%	±%
Reform	Richard Bollard	4,002	60.16	
Liberal	William Thompson	2,554	38.39	
Social Democrat	John Furniss	96	1.44	
Majority		2,552	38.36	
Informal votes		83	1.24	
Turnout		6,652	89.96	
Registered electors		7,394		

=== 1911 election ===
1911 general election: Raglan, first ballot
Party	Candidate	Votes	%	±%
Reform	Richard Bollard	2,435	46.02	
Reform	Allen Bell	894	16.90	
Liberal	James Charles Dromgool	750	14.18	
Liberal	William Duncan	742	14.02	
Independent Liberal	Basil Hewett	470	8.88	
Majority		1,541	29.12	
Informal votes		99	1.84	
Turnout		5,390	82.01	
Registered electors		6,572		

1911 general election: Raglan, second ballot
Party	Candidate	Votes	%	±%
Reform	Richard Bollard	2,782	59.89	
Reform	Allen Bell (Note: Richard Bollard was the official candidate endorsed by the Reform Party; Allen Bell was an unofficial candidate who also stood for the Reform Party.)	1,863	40.11	
Majority		919	19.78	
Informal votes		20	0.43	
Turnout		4,665	70.98	
Registered electors		6,572		

Table footnotes:

=== 1867 by-election ===
1867 Raglan by-election
Party	Candidate	Votes	%	±%
Independent	James Farmer	224	56.85	
Independent	Joseph Crispe	127	32.23	
Independent	Henry Chamberlin	43	10.91	
Turnout		394		
Majority		97	24.62	
