= 1949 New Zealand general election =

- 29 (Māori) & 30 November (general) 1949

All 80 seats in the New Zealand Parliament 41 seats were needed for a majority
- Turnout: 1,113,852 (96.3%) ▲
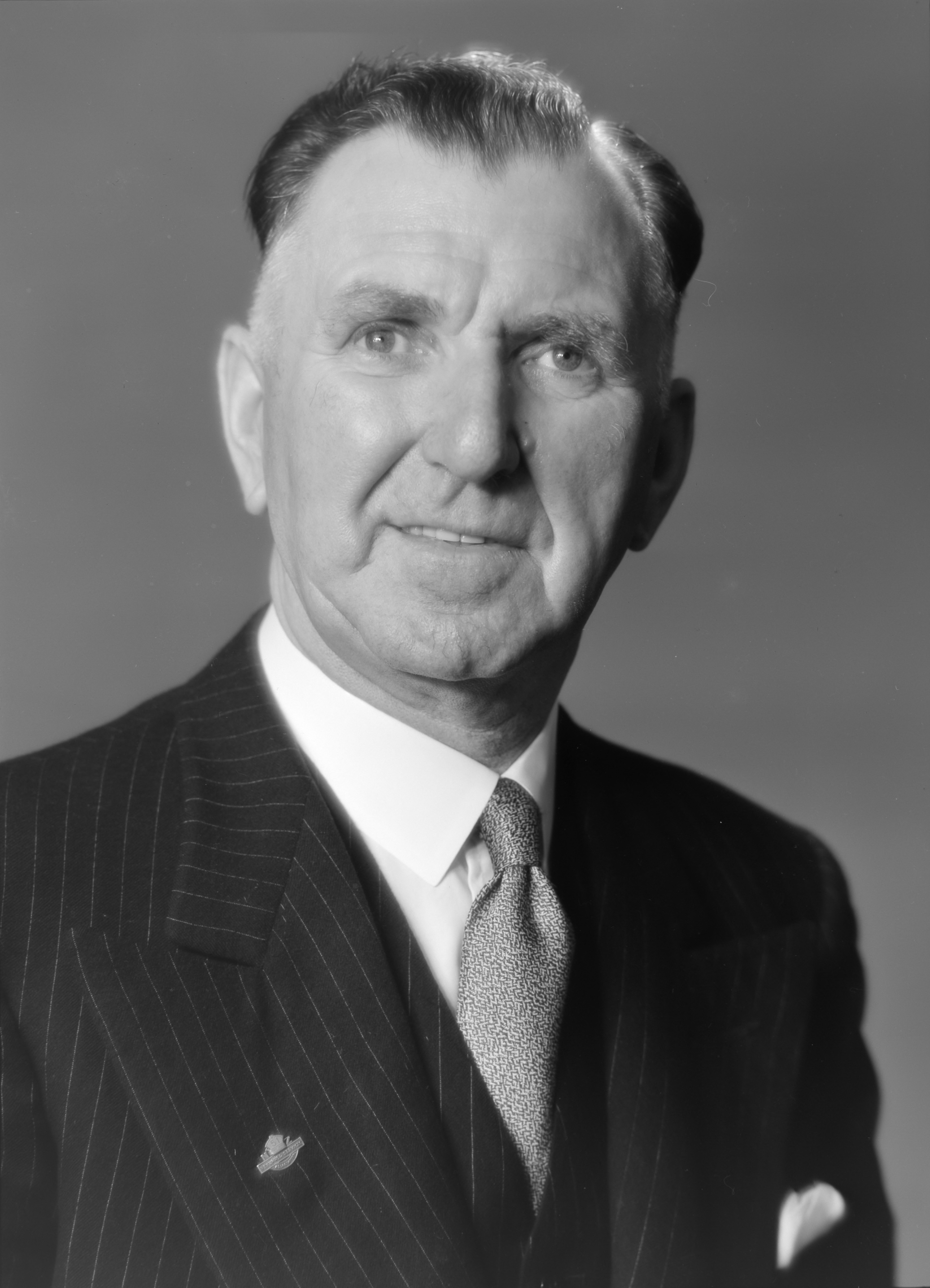

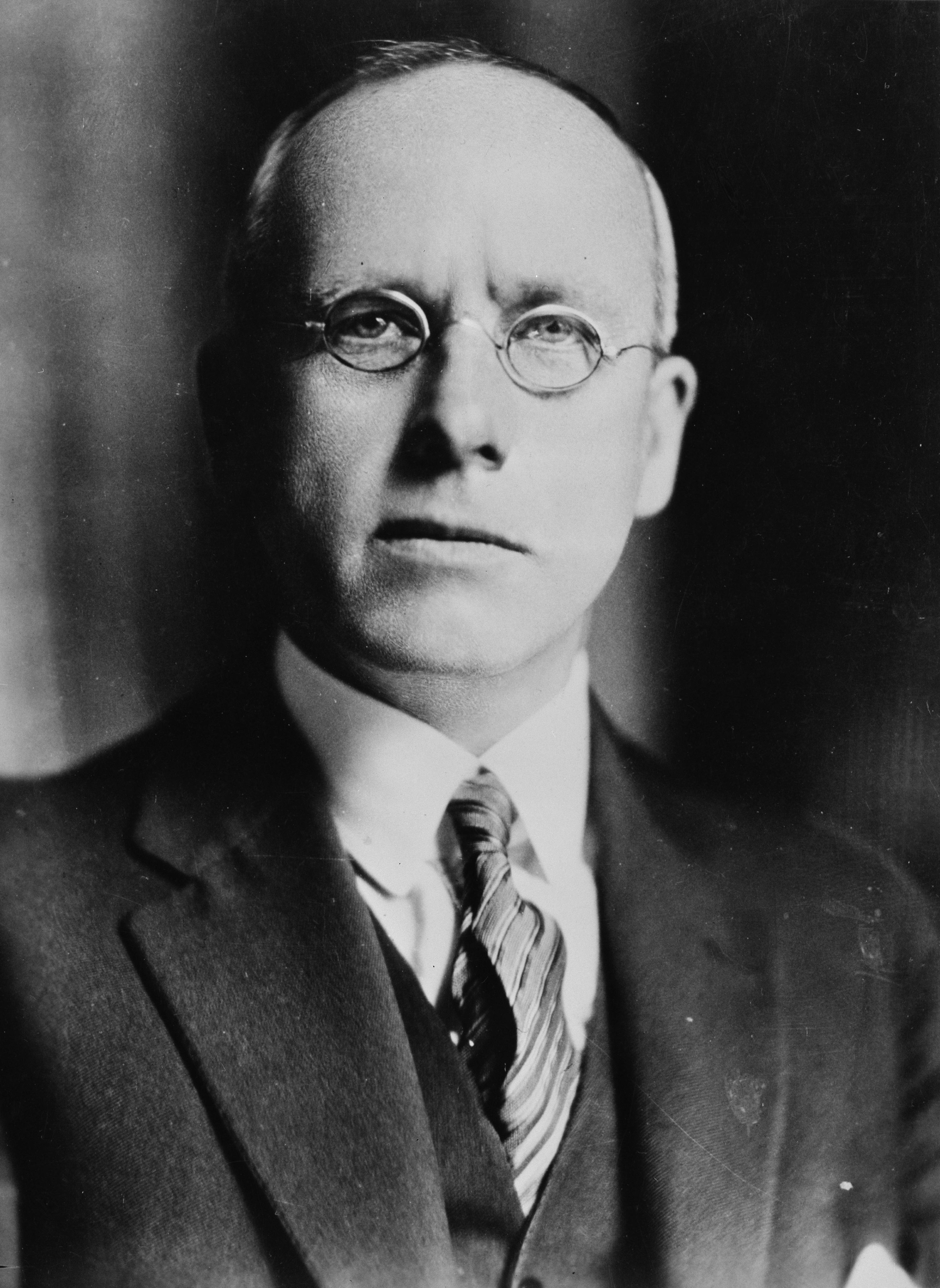
	First party	Second party
Leader	Sidney Holland	Peter Fraser
Party	National	Labour
Leader since	26 November 1940	4 April 1940
Leader's seat	Fendalton	Brooklyn
Last election	38 seats, 48.4%	42 seats, 51.3%
Seats won	46	34
Seat change	▲8	▼8
Popular vote	556,805	506,073
Percentage	51.9%	47.2%
Swing	▲3.5%	▼4.1%
- Results of the election.
Prime Minister before election
Peter Fraser
Labour
Subsequent Prime Minister
Sidney Holland
National

The 1949 New Zealand general election was a nationwide vote to determine the shape of the New Zealand Parliament's 29th term. It saw the governing Labour Party defeated by the opposition National Party. This marked the end of the 14-year First Labour government and the beginning of the First National government.

== Background ==
The Labour Party had formed its first ministry after winning the 1935 election, and had remained in power (with gradually decreasing majorities) since then. The National Party, formed by a merger of the parties which Labour had originally ousted, gradually increased its power in Parliament; the ineffectual Adam Hamilton was replaced by Sidney Holland, and internal disputes were gradually resolved. The Prime Minister, Peter Fraser, was increasingly weary. Ongoing shortages after World War II also eroded public support for the government. The National Party's decision not to repeal Labour's social welfare policies also increased its appeal.

=== MPs retiring in 1949 ===
Two Labour MPs and one National MP intended to retire at the end of the Parliament.

Party	Name	Electorate
Labour	David Coleman	Gisborne
Labour	Charles Petrie	Otahuhu
National	Garnet Mackley	Wairarapa

== The election ==
The date for the main elections was a Wednesday 30 November. Elections to the four Māori electorates were held the day before—the 1949 elections were the last in which Māori voted on a different day. 1,113,852 people were registered to vote, although rolls for the Māori electorates were "woefully inadequate." Voter turnout for the elections is disputed, given the problems with the Māori roll—some sources place it at 93.5 percent, while others estimate 92.9 percent. Regardless, the turnout was relatively high for the time. The number of seats being contested was 80, a number which had been fixed since 1902.

== Election results ==
=== Party standings ===
The 1949 election saw the governing Labour Party defeated by a twelve-seat margin. It has previously held a four-seat majority. Labour won a total of 34 seats, as opposed to National's 46. The popular vote was considerably closer—Labour won 47.2 percent to National's 51.9 percent. No seats were won by minor party candidates or by independents.

John A. Lee stood for Grey Lynn as the sole Democratic Labour candidate and got 2,627 votes, coming third.

Election results
Party	Candidates	Total votes	Percentage	Seats won	change
National	80	556,805	51.88	46	+8
Labour	80	506,073	47.16	34	−8
Communist	16	3,499	0.33	0	±0
Democratic Labour	1	2,627	0.24	0	±0
Others	19	4,150	0.39	0	±0
Total	196	1,073,154		80	

=== Votes summary ===
Popular Vote
National	51.88%
Labour	47.16%
Others	0.96%

Parliament seats
National	57.50%
Labour	42.50%

=== Initial MPs ===
The table below shows the results of the 1949 general election:

Key

Labour National

Electorate results for the 1949 New Zealand general election
Electorate	Incumbent	Winner	Majority	Runner up
General electorates
Arch Hill	Bill Parry		5,174	Gordon Frederick Smith
Ashburton	Geoff Gerard		2,385	William Erle Rose
Auckland Central	Bill Anderton		2,799	Leonard Bradley
Avon	John Mathison		4,593	George Nelson Kinzett
Awarua	George Richard Herron		3,179	Neville Pickering
Bay of Plenty	Bill Sullivan		3,680	Godfrey Santon
Brooklyn	Peter Fraser		2,956	Berta Burns
Buller	Jerry Skinner		2,206	Phil McDonald
Central Otago	William Bodkin		3,906	Thomas Augustus Rodgers
Christchurch Central	Robert Macfarlane		3,637	Kevin Marlow
Clutha	James Roy		3,231	John Edward Keenan
Dunedin Central	Phil Connolly		989	David Murdoch
Dunedin North	Robert Walls		668	Richard Brickell
Eden	Wilfred Fortune		2,259	Pat Curran
Egmont	Ernest Corbett		4,539	Brian Edgar Richmond
Fendalton	Sidney Holland		4,076	Robert Newman
Franklin	Jack Massey		5,481	John Parsons
Gisborne	David Coleman	Reginald Keeling	489	Harry Dudfield
Grey Lynn	Fred Hackett		4,203	John Leon Faulkner
Hamilton	Hilda Ross		1,605	Jack Granville
Hastings	Ted Cullen	Sydney Jones	982	Ted Cullen
Hauraki	Andy Sutherland		3,944	Percival Peacock
Hawke's Bay	Cyril Harker		3,442	Dick Beattie
Hobson	Sidney Walter Smith		5,068	William Edmund Lane
Hurunui	William Gillespie		2,535	Arthur J. Smith
Hutt	Walter Nash		2,273	Horace Leonard Heatley
Invercargill	Ralph Hanan		1,159	William Denham
Island Bay	Robert McKeen		2,770	Herbert Edward Childs
Karori	Charles Bowden		3,585	Ethel Harris
Lyttelton	Terry McCombs		978	Richard Ralph Beauchamp
Manawatu	Matthew Oram		3,433	Basil A. Rodgers
Marlborough	Tom Shand		1,862	James Harrison Wilson
Marsden	Alfred Murdoch		3,276	Douglas L. Ross
Miramar	Bob Semple		1,315	Cuthbert Taylor
Mornington	Wally Hudson		4,185	Geoffrey Stephens
Mount Albert	Warren Freer		931	Reg Judson
Mount Victoria	Jack Marshall		1,808	Nathan Seddon
Napier	Tommy Armstrong		721	William Tucker
Nelson	Edgar Neale		1,373	Reynell Marshall
New Plymouth	Ernest Aderman		1,517	Clarence Robert Parker
North Shore	Martyn Finlay	Dean Eyre	1,344	Martyn Finlay
Oamaru	Arnold Nordmeyer	Thomas Hayman	694	Arnold Nordmeyer
Onehunga	Arthur Osborne		2,300	Alan A. Coates
Onslow	Harry Combs		1,927	John S. Meadowcroft
Otahuhu	Charles Petrie	Leon Götz	1,275	Alex Dixon
Otaki	Jimmy Maher		374	Denzil Capstick
Pahiatua	Keith Holyoake		4,507	George Patrick O'Leary
Palmerston North	Ormond Wilson	Blair Tennent	518	Ormond Wilson
Parnell	Duncan Rae		960	Bill Schramm
Patea	William Sheat		1,841	Frederick William Finer
Petone	Mick Moohan		2,527	Norm Croft
Piako	Stan Goosman		6,266	Gilbert Parsons Kenah
Ponsonby	Ritchie Macdonald		2,278	Brian Kingston
Raglan	Alan Baxter	Hallyburton Johnstone	1,022	Alan Baxter
Rangitikei	Edward Gordon		3,310	Eric De Malmanche
Remuera	Ronald Algie		5,079	Hugh Watt
Riccarton	Angus McLagan		2,707	Harry Lake
Rodney	Clifton Webb		4,546	Arthur Leaming
Roskill	Frank Langstone	John Rae	1,415	James Freeman
St Albans	Jack Watts		1,142	George Manning
St Kilda	Fred Jones		331	Gerald Lyon
Selwyn	John McAlpine		1,327	Alan Sharp
Sydenham	Mabel Howard		5,643	Oliver G. Moody
Tamaki	Tom Skinner	Eric Halstead	1,095	Tom Skinner
Tauranga	Frederick Doidge		4,595	Hillary Joseph Pickett
Timaru	Clyde Carr		832	Jack Lockington
Waikato	Geoffrey Sim		5,923	John Ronald Burfitt
Waimarino	Paddy Kearins		202	Arthur Herbert MacPherson
Waimate	David Campbell Kidd		1,767	Roy Davison
Wairarapa	Garnet Mackley	Bert Cooksley	963	George Anders Hansen
Waitakere	Rex Mason		930	Robert Tapper
Waitomo	Walter Broadfoot		5,079	Frank Kitts
Wallace	Tom Macdonald		4,511	Herman Victor Freeman
Wanganui	Joe Cotterill		1,019	Ernest Victor O'Keefe
Wellington Central	Charles Chapman		575	Will Appleton
Westland	Jim Kent		2,744	Patrick Joseph O'Regan
Māori electorates
Eastern Maori	Tiaki Omana		3,211	Turi Carroll
Northern Maori	Tapihana Paraire Paikea		2,029	James Henare
Southern Maori	Eruera Tirikatene		687	Huro Nathanial Bates
Western Maori	vacant (Note: Matiu Ratana, the previous holder of the Western Maori electorate, died on 7 October 1949. His wife Iriaka Rātana stood for election instead.)	Iriaka Rātana	6,317	Hoeroa Marumaru

Table footnotes:
