= Egmont Village =

Settlement in Taranaki, New Zealand

- Interactive map of Egmont Village
- Coordinates: 39°8′44″S 174°8′42″E
- Country: New Zealand
- Region: Taranaki Region
- Territorial authority: New Plymouth District
- Ward: Kōhanga Moa General Ward; Te Purutanga Mauri Pūmanawa Māori Ward
- Community: Inglewood Community
- Electorates: New Plymouth; Te Tai Hauāuru (Māori)

Government
  - Territorial Authority: New Plymouth District Council
  - Regional council: Taranaki Regional Council
  - Mayor of New Plymouth: Max Brough
  - New Plymouth MP: David MacLeod
  - Te Tai Hauāuru MP: Debbie Ngarewa-Packer

Area
  - Total: 1.44 km^{2} (0.56 sq mi)

Population (June 2025)
  - Total: 350
  - Density: 240/km^{2} (630/sq mi)

Egmont Village is a settlement in Taranaki, New Zealand. State Highway 3 runs through it. New Plymouth is 12 km to the north-west, and Inglewood is 6 km to the south-east. Waiwhakaiho River and Mangaoraka Stream flow past to the west and east, respectively.

== Demographics ==
Egmont Village is described by Stats NZ as a rural settlement which covers 1.44 km^{2} (0.56 sq mi). It had an estimated population of 350 as of June 2025, with a population density of 243 people per km^{2}. It is part of the larger Mangaoraka statistical area.

Historical population for Egmont Village
Year	Pop.	±% p.a.
2006	273	—
2013	279	+0.31%
2018	327	+3.23%
2023	345	+1.08%

Egmont Village had a population of 345 in the 2023 New Zealand census, an increase of 18 people (5.5%) since the 2018 census, and an increase of 66 people (23.7%) since the 2013 census. There were 180 males and 168 females in 120 dwellings. 2.6% of people identified as LGBTIQ+. The median age was 41.4 years (compared with 38.1 years nationally). There were 81 people (23.5%) aged under 15 years, 48 (13.9%) aged 15 to 29, 165 (47.8%) aged 30 to 64, and 54 (15.7%) aged 65 or older.

People could identify as more than one ethnicity. The results were 96.5% European (Pākehā), 8.7% Māori, 0.9% Pasifika, 2.6% Asian, and 5.2% other, which includes people giving their ethnicity as "New Zealander". English was spoken by 95.7%, Māori by 1.7%, and other languages by 6.1%. No language could be spoken by 4.3% (e.g. too young to talk). The percentage of people born overseas was 15.7, compared with 28.8% nationally.

Religious affiliations were 24.3% Christian, 0.9% Islam, 0.9% New Age, and 1.7% other religions. People who answered that they had no religion were 60.9%, and 11.3% of people did not answer the census question.

Of those at least 15 years old, 51 (19.3%) people had a bachelor's or higher degree, 150 (56.8%) had a post-high school certificate or diploma, and 60 (22.7%) people exclusively held high school qualifications. The median income was $38,800, compared with $41,500 nationally. 30 people (11.4%) earned over $100,000 compared to 12.1% nationally. The employment status of those at least 15 was 132 (50.0%) full-time, 45 (17.0%) part-time, and 3 (1.1%) unemployed.

=== Mangaoraka statistical area ===
Mangaoraka statistical area covers 85.45 km^{2} (32.99 sq mi) and had an estimated population of 2,110 as of June 2025, with a population density of 25 people per km^{2}.

Historical population for Mangaoraka
Year	Pop.	±% p.a.
2006	1,251	—
2013	1,599	+3.57%
2018	1,869	+3.17%
2023	2,046	+1.83%
The 2006 population is for a smaller area of 81.68 km^{2}. Source:

Mangaoraka had a population of 2,046 in the 2023 New Zealand census, an increase of 177 people (9.5%) since the 2018 census, and an increase of 447 people (28.0%) since the 2013 census. There were 1,068 males, 969 females, and 6 people of other genders in 708 dwellings. 2.1% of people identified as LGBTIQ+. The median age was 41.1 years (compared with 38.1 years nationally). There were 465 people (22.7%) aged under 15 years, 294 (14.4%) aged 15 to 29, 972 (47.5%) aged 30 to 64, and 312 (15.2%) aged 65 or older.

People could identify as more than one ethnicity. The results were 94.4% European (Pākehā); 10.6% Māori; 1.3% Pasifika; 1.3% Asian; 0.4% Middle Eastern, Latin American and African New Zealanders (MELAA); and 4.1% other, which includes people giving their ethnicity as "New Zealander". English was spoken by 97.8%, Māori by 1.5%, Samoan by 0.1%, and other languages by 4.5%. No language could be spoken by 2.2% (e.g. too young to talk). New Zealand Sign Language was known by 0.4%. The percentage of people born overseas was 12.0, compared with 28.8% nationally.

Religious affiliations were 26.0% Christian, 0.3% Islam, 0.3% Buddhist, 0.4% New Age, and 1.2% other religions. People who answered that they had no religion were 62.0%, and 9.8% of people did not answer the census question.

Of those at least 15 years old, 273 (17.3%) people had a bachelor's or higher degree, 969 (61.3%) had a post-high school certificate or diploma, and 336 (21.3%) people exclusively held high school qualifications. The median income was $44,700, compared with $41,500 nationally. 258 people (16.3%) earned over $100,000 compared to 12.1% nationally. The employment status of those at least 15 was 855 (54.1%) full-time, 300 (19.0%) part-time, and 30 (1.9%) unemployed.

== Education ==
Egmont Village School is a coeducational full primary (years 1-8) school with a roll of 201 students as of October 2025. The school was founded in 1877. The school is the location of the Egmont Village Blockhouse, a defensive building set up in 1868, due to settlers' fears during Tītokowaru's War.
