= St Kilda (New Zealand electorate) =

St Kilda is a former New Zealand parliamentary electorate. It existed from 1946 to 1996 and was represented by four Members of Parliament.

== Population centres ==
The 1941 New Zealand census had been postponed due to World War II, so the 1946 electoral redistribution had to take ten years of population growth and movements into account. The North Island gained a further two electorates from the South Island due to faster population growth. The abolition of the country quota through the Electoral Amendment Act, 1945 reduced the number and increased the size of rural electorates. None of the existing electorates remained unchanged, 27 electorates were abolished, eight former electorates were re-established, and 19 electorates were created for the first time, including St Kilda. The original electorate covered the southern part of Otago Peninsula and some of the settlements that form the suburb of South Dunedin, including St Kilda. It thus took up most of the area that previously belonged to the Dunedin Central electorate (which in itself took over most of the area that previously belonged to the Dunedin West electorate), and some area that had belonged to the Dunedin South electorate (which was abolished).

The southern part of Otago Peninsula has always belonged to the St Kilda electorate until the 1987 electoral redistribution, and the various electoral redistributions determined how much of the suburb of South Dunedin belonged to the electorate.

== History ==
The electorate was created in 1946, and was abolished in 1996 (the first election using the mixed-member proportional representation (MMP) system), when it was absorbed into the Dunedin South electorate.

The first representative was Fred Jones. He previously represented the Dunedin South electorate and retired at the end of two parliamentary terms of representing St Kilda in 1951.

=== Members of Parliament ===
Key

Labour National

| Election | Winner |
|---|---|
| 1946 election | Fred Jones |
| 1949 election | Fred Jones |
| 1951 election | Jim Barnes |
| 1954 election | Jim Barnes |
| 1957 election | Bill Fraser |
| 1960 election | Bill Fraser |
| 1963 election | Bill Fraser |
| 1966 election | Bill Fraser |
| 1969 election | Bill Fraser |
| 1972 election | Bill Fraser |
| 1975 election | Bill Fraser |
| 1978 election | Bill Fraser |
| 1981 election | Michael Cullen |
| 1984 election | Michael Cullen |
| 1987 election | Michael Cullen |
| 1990 election | Michael Cullen |
| 1993 election | Michael Cullen |
(Electorate abolished in 1996; see Dunedin South)

== Election results ==
=== 1993 election ===
1993 general election: St Kilda
| Party | Candidate | Votes | % | ±% |
|---|---|---|---|---|
| Labour | Michael Cullen | 10,019 | 47.07 | −0.83 |
| Alliance | Leah McBey | 4,948 | 23.24 | |
| National | Malcolm MacPherson | 4,899 | 23.01 | |
| NZ First | Kevin Fogarty | 1,027 | 4.82 | |
| Christian Heritage | Hank Geerlofs | 392 | 1.84 | |
| Majority | | 5,071 | 23.82 | +14.60 |
| Turnout | | 21,285 | 85.75 | +1.07 |
| Registered electors | | 24,821 | | |

=== 1990 election ===
1990 general election: St Kilda
| Party | Candidate | Votes | % | ±% |
|---|---|---|---|---|
| Labour | Michael Cullen | 9,797 | 47.90 | −12.35 |
| National | Bruce Alexander | 7,911 | 38.68 | |
| Green | Ursula Finn | 1,297 | 6.34 | |
| NewLabour | Harold Love | 1,059 | 5.17 | |
| Social Credit | Bob Warren | 325 | 1.58 | |
| Democrats | Milan Radich | 61 | 0.29 | |
| Majority | | 1,886 | 9.22 | −18.06 |
| Turnout | | 20,450 | 84.68 | −3.24 |
| Registered electors | | 24,148 | | |

=== 1987 election ===
1987 general election: St Kilda
| Party | Candidate | Votes | % | ±% |
|---|---|---|---|---|
| Labour | Michael Cullen | 12,568 | 60.25 | +6.07 |
| National | Lyndon Weggery | 6,876 | 32.96 | |
| Democrats | Ron Coles | 1,172 | 5.61 | −0.04 |
| Wizard Party | E J Thomas | 242 | 1.16 | |
| Majority | | 5,692 | 27.28 | +18.40 |
| Turnout | | 20,858 | 87.92 | −5.07 |
| Registered electors | | 23,723 | | |

=== 1984 election ===
1984 general election: St Kilda
| Party | Candidate | Votes | % | ±% |
|---|---|---|---|---|
| Labour | Michael Cullen | 11,643 | 54.18 | +4.25 |
| National | Stuart Clark | 6,049 | 28.15 | −4.62 |
| NZ Party | John M. Hayes | 2,428 | 11.30 | |
| Social Credit | Ron Coles | 1,215 | 5.65 | −11.64 |
| Independent | D W Morrison | 151 | 0.70 | |
| Majority | | 5,594 | 26.03 | +8.88 |
| Turnout | | 21,486 | 92.99 | +2.12 |
| Registered electors | | 23,105 | | |

=== 1981 election ===
1981 general election: St Kilda
| Party | Candidate | Votes | % | ±% |
|---|---|---|---|---|
| Labour | Michael Cullen | 10,419 | 49.93 | |
| National | Stuart Clark | 6,840 | 32.77 | |
| Social Credit | Ron Coles | 3,608 | 17.29 | |
| Majority | | 3,579 | 17.15 | |
| Turnout | | 20,867 | 90.87 | +17.11 |
| Registered electors | | 22,963 | | |

=== 1978 election ===
1978 general election: St Kilda
| Party | Candidate | Votes | % | ±% |
|---|---|---|---|---|
| Labour | Bill Fraser | 10,064 | 49.02 | +0.90 |
| National | Graeme Laing | 7,105 | 34.60 | |
| Social Credit | Joy Clapham | 2,638 | 12.85 | |
| Values | Norman Mearns | 698 | 3.40 | |
| Socialist Unity | Rodger Smitheram | 24 | 0.11 | |
| Majority | | 2,959 | 14.41 | +5.00 |
| Turnout | | 20,529 | 73.77 | −11.93 |
| Registered electors | | 27,825 | | |

=== 1975 election ===
1975 general election: St Kilda
| Party | Candidate | Votes | % | ±% |
|---|---|---|---|---|
| Labour | Bill Fraser | 9,663 | 48.12 | −11.66 |
| National | Gordon Heslop | 7,773 | 38.71 | |
| Social Credit | Joy Clapham | 1,414 | 7.04 | |
| Values | Trevor Reeves | 1,227 | 6.11 | |
| Majority | | 1,890 | 9.41 | −21.04 |
| Turnout | | 20,077 | 85.70 | −11.84 |
| Registered electors | | 23,426 | | |

=== 1972 election ===
1972 general election: St Kilda
| Party | Candidate | Votes | % | ±% |
|---|---|---|---|---|
| Labour | Bill Fraser | 11,022 | 59.78 | +3.01 |
| National | Charles Kirby | 5,407 | 29.32 | |
| Social Credit | John Burgoyne Tavener | 1,069 | 5.79 | |
| Values | Aynsley Kellow | 804 | 4.36 | |
| New Democratic | John Robert Lumsden | 103 | 0.55 | |
| Independent | Harold Smith | 31 | 0.16 | |
| Majority | | 5,615 | 30.45 | +8.40 |
| Turnout | | 18,436 | 97.54 | +7.42 |
| Registered electors | | 18,900 | | |

=== 1969 election ===
1969 general election: St Kilda
| Party | Candidate | Votes | % | ±% |
|---|---|---|---|---|
| Labour | Bill Fraser | 9,769 | 56.77 | +4.14 |
| National | Lloyd George Anderson | 5,974 | 34.71 | |
| Social Credit | D J W Sheppard | 1,355 | 7.87 | |
| Independent | J C M McPhee | 109 | 0.63 | |
| Majority | | 3,795 | 22.05 | +5.04 |
| Turnout | | 17,207 | 90.12 | +1.31 |
| Registered electors | | 19,093 | | |

=== 1966 election ===
1966 general election: St Kilda
| Party | Candidate | Votes | % | ±% |
|---|---|---|---|---|
| Labour | Bill Fraser | 8,691 | 52.63 | −1.17 |
| National | R M Hall | 5,882 | 35.62 | |
| Social Credit | G M Chapman | 1,938 | 11.73 | |
| Majority | | 2,809 | 17.01 | +1.75 |
| Turnout | | 16,511 | 88.81 | −2.41 |
| Registered electors | | 18,590 | | |

=== 1963 election ===
1963 general election: St Kilda
| Party | Candidate | Votes | % | ±% |
|---|---|---|---|---|
| Labour | Bill Fraser | 9,152 | 53.80 | +4.87 |
| National | Kevin John Marlow | 6,555 | 38.54 | |
| Social Credit | Alexander John Lumsden | 1,301 | 7.64 | |
| Majority | | 2,597 | 15.26 | +9.93 |
| Turnout | | 17,008 | 91.22 | −1.35 |
| Registered electors | | 18,644 | | |

=== 1960 election ===
1960 general election: St Kilda
| Party | Candidate | Votes | % | ±% |
|---|---|---|---|---|
| Labour | Bill Fraser | 7,662 | 48.93 | −1.47 |
| National | Jim Barnes | 6,827 | 43.60 | −1.85 |
| Social Credit | T A Greenwood | 1,169 | 7.46 | |
| Majority | | 835 | 5.33 | +0.39 |
| Turnout | | 15,658 | 92.57 | −1.93 |
| Registered electors | | 16,914 | | |

=== 1957 election ===
1957 general election: St Kilda
| Party | Candidate | Votes | % | ±% |
|---|---|---|---|---|
| Labour | Bill Fraser | 8,058 | 50.40 | |
| National | Jim Barnes | 7,267 | 45.45 | +4.56 |
| Social Credit | S G Ernslie | 509 | 3.18 | |
| Independent | Fred Poole | 153 | 0.95 | |
| Majority | | 791 | 4.94 | |
| Turnout | | 15,987 | 94.50 | +1.12 |
| Registered electors | | 16,916 | | |

=== 1954 election ===
1954 general election: St Kilda
| Party | Candidate | Votes | % | ±% |
|---|---|---|---|---|
| National | Jim Barnes | 5,679 | 40.89 | −10.89 |
| Labour | Fred Jones | 5,565 | 40.07 | −8.74 |
| Social Credit | B Murray | 2,642 | 19.02 | |
| Majority | | 114 | 0.82 | −1.54 |
| Turnout | | 13,886 | 93.38 | +1.00 |
| Registered electors | | 14,869 | | |

=== 1951 election ===
1951 general election: St Kilda
| Party | Candidate | Votes | % | ±% |
|---|---|---|---|---|
| National | Jim Barnes | 7,279 | 51.18 | |
| Labour | Fred Jones | 6,943 | 48.81 | −2.34 |
| Majority | | 336 | 2.36 | −0.05 |
| Turnout | | 14,222 | 92.38 | −2.37 |
| Registered electors | | 15,394 | | |

=== 1949 election ===
1949 general election: St Kilda
| Party | Candidate | Votes | % | ±% |
|---|---|---|---|---|
| Labour | Fred Jones | 7,310 | 51.15 | −3.29 |
| National | Gerald Lyon | 6,979 | 48.84 | |
| Majority | | 331 | 2.31 | −6.55 |
| Turnout | | 14,289 | 94.75 | +0.25 |
| Registered electors | | 15,080 | | |

=== 1946 election ===
1946 general election: St Kilda
| Party | Candidate | Votes | % | ±% |
|---|---|---|---|---|
| Labour | Fred Jones | 7,662 | 54.44 | |
| National | Leonard James Tobin Ireland | 6,414 | 45.56 | |
| Majority | | 1,248 | 8.86 | |
| Turnout | | 14,076 | 95.00 | |
| Registered electors | | 14,816 | | |
