= 27th New Zealand Parliament =

Term of the Parliament of New Zealand

27th Parliament of New Zealand
←	26th Parliament	28th Parliament	→
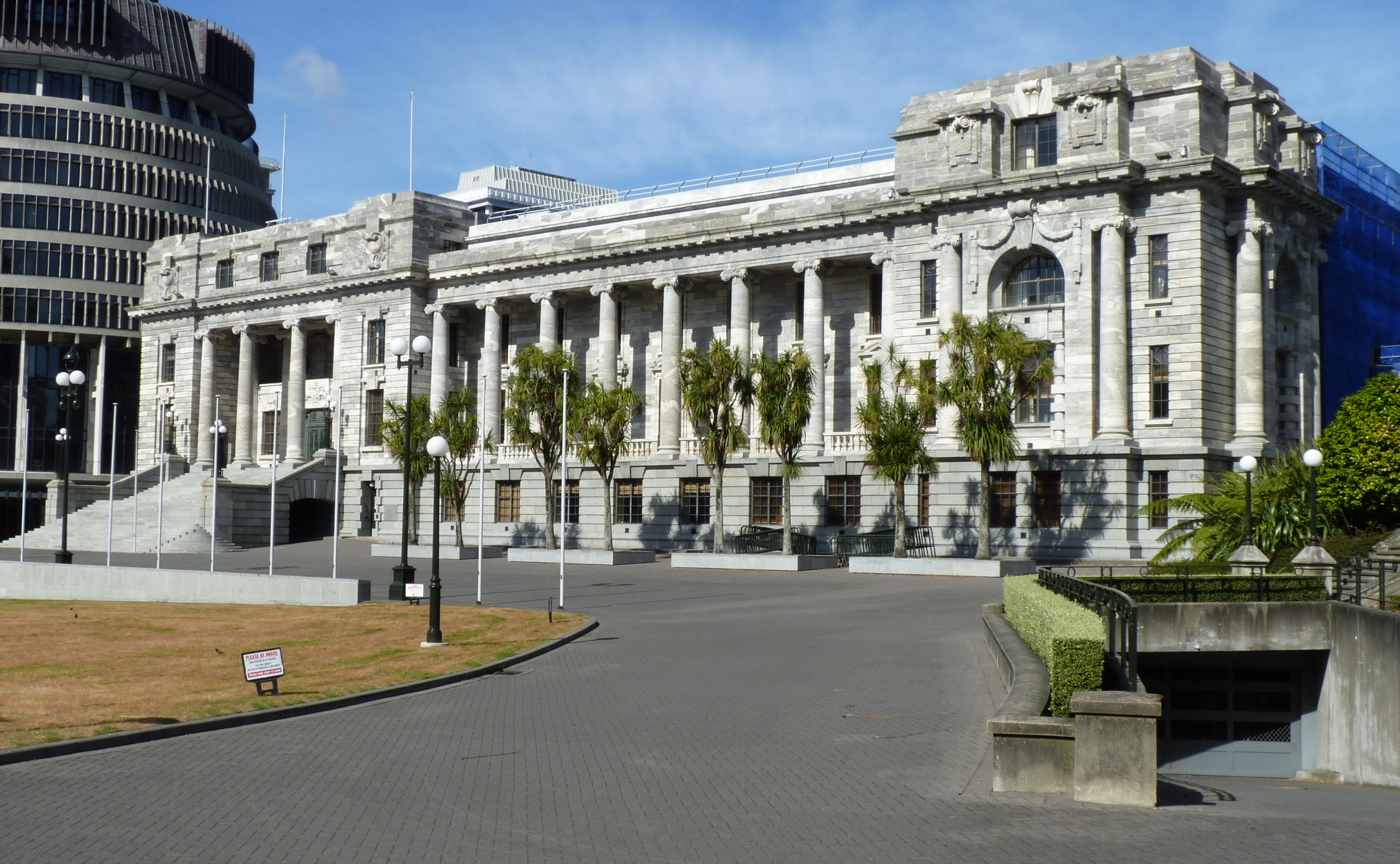
- Parliament House, Wellington

Overview
- Legislative body: New Zealand Parliament
- Term: 22 February 1944 – 12 October 1946
- Election: 1943 New Zealand general election
- Government: First Labour Government

House of Representatives
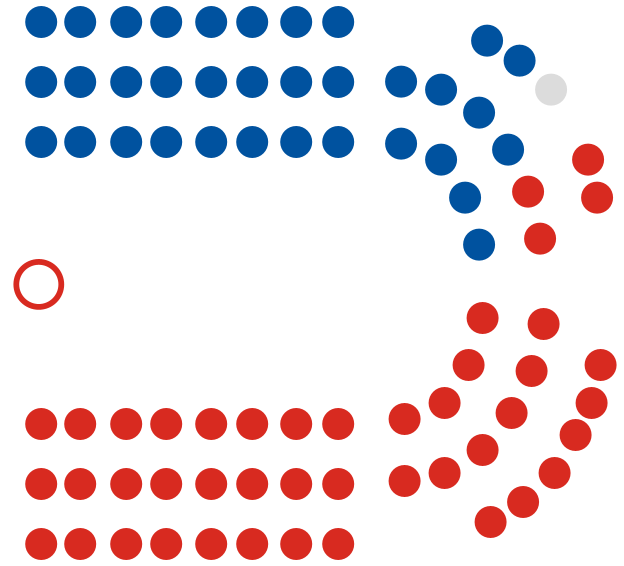
- Members: 80
- Speaker of the House: Bill Schramm
- Prime Minister: Peter Fraser
- Leader of the Opposition: Sidney Holland

Legislative Council
- Members: 36 (at start); 37 (at end)
- Speaker of the Council: Mark Fagan

Sovereign
- Monarch: HM George VI
- Governor-General: HE Lt. Gen. The Lord Freyberg from 17 June 1946 — HE Rt. Hon. Sir Cyrill Newall until 19 April 1946

The 27th New Zealand Parliament was a term of the New Zealand Parliament. It was elected at the 1943 general election in September of that year.

== 1943 general election ==
The 1943 general election was held on Friday, 24 September in the Māori electorates and on Saturday, 25 September in the general electorates, respectively. A total of 80 MPs were elected; 48 represented North Island electorates, 28 represented South Island electorates, and the remaining four represented Māori electorates. 1,021,034 civilian voters were enrolled and the official turnout at the election was 82.8%. In addition, 92,934 military votes were cast.

== Sessions ==
The 27th Parliament sat for three sessions, and was prorogued on 4 November 1946. The twenty-seventh parliament absent-mindedly increased its own life in 1946 when it was forgotten that because of the 24 to 25 September election in 1943 its three years of life ended on 11 October. The House convened to conclude the session on the subsequent day, but no business was conducted. It remained undissolved until 4 November 1946. for election on 26 and 27 November.

Session	Opened	Adjourned
first	22 February 1944	15 December 1944
second	27 June 1945	7 December 1945
third	26 June 1946	12 October 1946

== Ministries ==
Peter Fraser of the Labour Party had been Prime Minister since 27 March 1940. He had formed the first Fraser Ministry on 1 April 1940 and the second Fraser Ministry on 30 April 1940. The second Fraser Ministry remained in power until its defeat by the National Party at the 1949 election.

A War Cabinet had been formed on 16 July 1940, which held the responsibility for all decisions relating to New Zealand's involvement in World War II. The War Cabinet was dissolved on 21 August 1945.

== Party standings ==
=== Start of Parliament ===
Party	Leader(s)	Seats at start
Labour Party	Peter Fraser	45
National Party	Sidney Holland	34
Independents		1

=== End of Parliament ===
Party	Leader(s)	Seats at end
Labour Party	Peter Fraser	44
National Party	Sidney Holland	35
Independents		1

== Members ==
=== Initial MPs ===
The table below shows the results of the 1943 general election:

Key

Labour National Democratic Labour Real Democracy Independent

Electorate results for the 1943 New Zealand general election
Electorate	Incumbent	Winner	Majority	Runner up
General electorates
Auckland Central	Bill Parry		4,769	William George Stanley Swabey
Auckland East	Bill Schramm		962	Harry Tom Merritt
Auckland Suburbs	Rex Mason		3,028	Thomas Augustus Bishop
Auckland West	Peter Carr		5,402	John W. Kealy
Avon	Dan Sullivan		4,460	James Neil Clarke
Awarua	James Hargest		Uncontested	
Bay of Islands	Charles Boswell	Sidney Walter Smith	1,276	Charles Boswell
Bay of Plenty	Bill Sullivan		1,679	Walter William Jonasen
Buller	Paddy Webb		4,635	Edward William Nicolaus
Central Otago	William Bodkin		2,723	James McIndoe Mackay
Christchurch East	Mabel Howard		5,537	Reginald Gilbert Brown
Christchurch North	Sidney Holland		2,645	George Manning
Christchurch South	Robert Macfarlane		4,416	Ron Guthrey
Clutha	James Roy		1,587	Herbert Kerr Edie
Dunedin Central	Peter Nielson		2,155	Leonard James Tobin Ireland
Dunedin North	Jim Munro		2,798	Alexander Cassie
Dunedin South	Fred Jones		3,061	David Murdoch
Dunedin West	Gervan McMillan	Phil Connolly	1,338	Alexander Smith Falconer
Eden	Bill Anderton		14	Wilfred Fortune
Egmont	Charles Wilkinson	Ernest Corbett	2,422	Edwin Thoms Cox
Franklin	Jack Massey		3,285	Aaron Best
Gisborne	David Coleman		572	Harry Barker
Grey Lynn	John A. Lee	Fred Hackett	6,059	John A. Lee
Hamilton	Charles Barrell	Frank Findlay	454	Charles Barrell
Hauraki	Andy Sutherland		2,723	Edmund Colin Nigel Robinson
Hawke's Bay	Ted Cullen		1,636	Eric N. Pryor
Hurunui	George Forbes	William Gillespie	1,566	James William Morgan
Hutt	Walter Nash		5,260	John H. Hogan
Invercargill	William Denham		987	William Bell
Kaiapoi	Morgan Williams		761	Harold Overton
Kaipara	Gordon Coates	Clifton Webb	2,800	John Stewart
Lyttelton	Terry McCombs		1,374	Ted Taylor
Manawatu	John Cobbe	Matthew Oram	2,305	William Henry Oliver (Note: Father of the historian W. H. Oliver)
Marlborough	Ted Meachen		450	Tom Shand
Marsden	Jim Barclay	Alfred Murdoch	1,006	Jim Barclay
Masterton	John Robertson	Garnet Mackley	494	John Robertson
Mataura	Tom Macdonald		Uncontested	
Mid-Canterbury	Mary Grigg	Geoff Gerard	634	David Barnes
Motueka	Jerry Skinner		301	John Robert Haldane
Napier	Bill Barnard	Tommy Armstrong	1,273	Morris Spence
Nelson	Harry Atmore		191	Frederick William Huggins
New Plymouth	Fred Frost	Ernest Aderman	1,276	Fred Frost
Oamaru	Arnold Nordmeyer		125	Thomas Ross Beatty
Onehunga	Arthur Osborne		3,324	John Park
Otahuhu	Charles Petrie		464	Gordon Hamilton
Otaki	Leonard Lowry		191	Bert Cooksley
Pahiatua	Alfred Ransom	Keith Holyoake	1,825	George Anders Hansen
Palmerston North	Joe Hodgens		212	Gus Mansford
Patea	Harold Dickie	William Sheat	912	Alex Langslow
Raglan	Lee Martin	Robert Coulter	108	Robert James Glasgow
Rangitikei	Edward Gordon		1,612	Robert Freeman
Remuera	Bill Endean	Ronald Algie	4,183	Martyn Finlay
Riccarton	Bert Kyle	Jack Watts	1,322	Harold Denton
Roskill	Arthur Richards		962	Roy McElroy
Rotorua	Alexander Moncur	Geoffrey Sim	715	Alexander Moncur
Stratford	William Polson		2,059	Brian Richmond
Tauranga	Frederick Doidge		3,625	Dudley A. Hill
Temuka	Jack Acland		1,690	George Harris
Thames	Jim Thorn		935	William Alexander Clark
Timaru	Clyde Carr		1,701	Jack Satterthwaite
Waikato	Stan Goosman		4,615	Charles Croall
Waimarino	Frank Langstone		1,404	Roger Oswald Montgomerie
Waipawa	Cyril Harker		2,091	Archie Low
Wairarapa	Ben Roberts		151	Jimmy Maher
Waitaki	David Campbell Kidd		821	John S. Adams
Waitemata	Mary Dreaver	Henry Thorne Morton	321	Mary Dreaver
Waitomo	Walter Broadfoot		1,881	Ben Waters
Wallace	Adam Hamilton		1,607	John James Lynch
Wanganui	Joe Cotterill		2,437	Eric James Kirk
Wellington Central	Peter Fraser		1,206	Will Appleton
Wellington East	Bob Semple		2,588	Len Jacobsen
Wellington North	Charles Chapman		1,897	Thomas Hislop
Wellington South	Robert McKeen		4,156	Ernest Toop
Wellington Suburbs	Harry Combs		2,581	Bill Veitch
Wellington West	Catherine Stewart	Charles Bowden	1,183	Catherine Stewart
Westland	James O'Brien		2,600	Frank Chivers
Māori electorates
Eastern Maori	Āpirana Ngata	Tiaki Omana	240	Āpirana Ngata
Northern Maori	Paraire Karaka Paikea	Tapihana Paraire Paikea	2,438	Eru Moka Pou
Southern Maori	Eruera Tirikatene		558	John Piuraki Tikao-Barrett
Western Maori	Toko Ratana		3,309	Pei Te Hurinui Jones

Table footnotes:

=== By-elections during 27th Parliament ===
There were a number of changes during the term of the 27th Parliament.

Electorate and by-election		Date	Incumbent	Cause	Winner
Awarua	1944	28 October	James Hargest	Death	George Herron
Western Maori	1945	10 February	Toko Ratana	Death	Matiu Ratana
Hamilton	1945	26 May	Frank Findlay	Death	Hilda Ross
Dunedin North	1945	21 July	Jim Munro	Death	Robert Walls
Raglan	1946	5 March	Robert Coulter	Death	Hallyburton Johnstone
