= 1945 Hamilton by-election =

New Zealand by-election

← 1943 general	27 May 1945	1946 general →
- Turnout: 13,855 (69.19%)
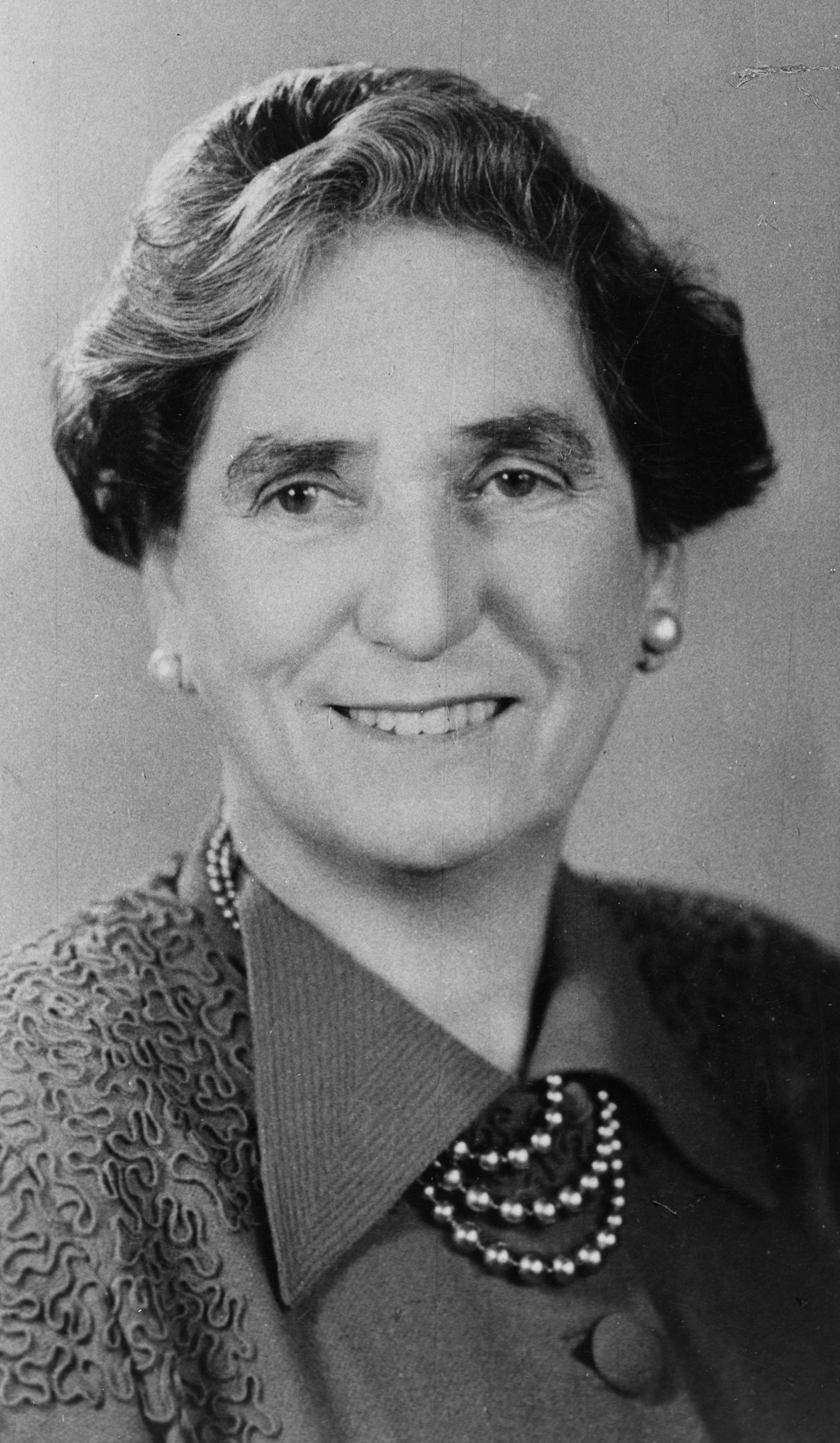

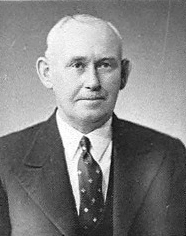

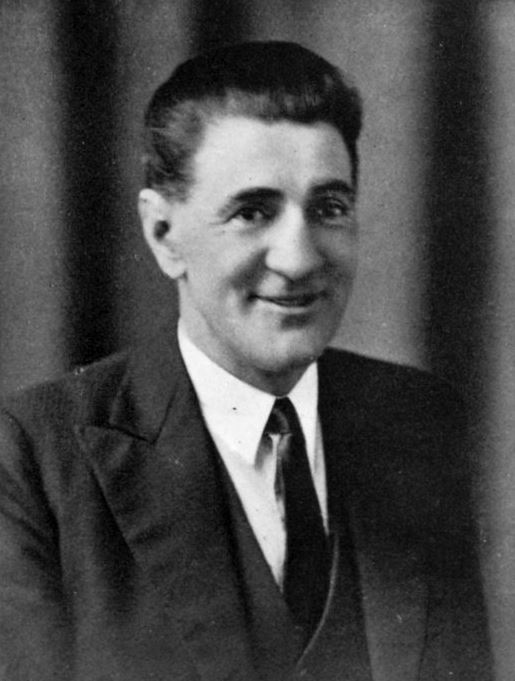
Candidate	Hilda Ross	Charles Barrell	John A. Lee
Party	National	Labour	Democratic Labour
Popular vote	6,772	5,691	1,229
Member before election
Frank Findlay
National
Elected Member
Hilda Ross
National

The 1945 Hamilton by-election was a by-election held during the 27th New Zealand Parliament in the Waikato electorate of Hamilton. The by-election occurred following the death of MP Frank Findlay and was won by Hilda Ross, both of the National Party.

== Background ==
Findlay, who was first elected to represent Hamilton in 1943, died on 31 March 1945. This triggered the Hamilton by-election, which was contested by four candidates.

Hilda Ross contested the election for the National Party. She had served as a member of the Hospital Board and Council in Hamilton for several years and was at the time of the election the Deputy-Mayor. Former Hamilton MP Charles Barrell was selected as the Labour Party's nominee. He had been MP for Hamilton between 1935 and 1943, before losing his seat to Findlay. Leader of the Democratic Labour Party (DLP), John A. Lee was his party's candidate. Lee had lost his seat of Grey Lynn in 1943 following his split with the Labour Party in 1940 and contested the Hamilton seat in an attempt to re-enter Parliament, where the DLP no longer had any presence. The fourth person to put their name forward was independent candidate Douglas Seymour.

The by-election was held soon after VE Day (which Walter Nash decided should be celebrated on 9 not 8 May), and a "badly-timed" gazette notice calling up more 18-year-olds for unspecified military service. The National Party proposed that New Zealand troops should be withdrawn from Italy and New Zealand's role in the Pacific restricted to food supply. The Australian High Commissioner Thomas d'Alton was not the only one to see the irony that Labour wanted to keep New Zealand troops overseas (to have a say in the peace) while National wanted to withdraw them. The government candidate lost by an increased margin.

== Previous election ==
1943 general election: Hamilton (Note: Registered electors refers to civilian voters only; nationwide, 93,295 servicemen also cast valid votes although their names did not appear on electoral rolls.)
Party	Candidate	Votes	%	±%
National	Frank Findlay	7,660	48.04	
Labour	Charles Barrell	7,206	45.20	−11.65
Democratic Labour	Alfred E. Allen	885	5.55	
Real Democracy	William Henry Thompson	193	1.21	
Majority		454	2.85	
Informal votes		167	1.04	+0.40
Turnout		16,111	92.21	−1.10
Registered electors		17,473		

Table footnotes:

== Results ==
The following table gives the election results:

1945 Hamilton by-election
Party	Candidate	Votes	%	±%
National	Hilda Ross	6,772	48.87	
Labour	Charles Barrell	5,691	41.07	−4.13
Democratic Labour	John A. Lee	1,229	8.87	
Independent	Douglas Seymour	163	1.17	
Informal votes		58	0.41	−0.63
Majority		1,081	7.80	
Turnout		13,855	69.19	−23.02
Registered electors		20,022		

Ross won the election, and would win every subsequent general election until 1959, when she died in office. Her death caused the 1959 Hamilton by-election.

== See also ==
- List of New Zealand by-elections
