= 1944 Awarua by-election =

New Zealand by-election

- 28 October 1922
- Turnout: 7,466

Candidate	George Herron	Leo Sylvester O'Sullivan
Party	National	Labour
Popular vote	4,659	2,558
Percentage	62.40	34.26
Member before election
James Hargest
National
Elected Member
George Herron
National

The 1944 Awarua by-election was a by-election held during the 27th New Zealand Parliament in the Southland electorate of Awarua. The by-election occurred following the death of MP James Hargest and was won by George Herron.

== Background ==
Hargest, who was first elected to represent Awarua in 1935, was killed in action on 12 August 1944. His death instigated the Awarua by-election, which was contested by three candidates.

George Herron, a local official in the Farmers Union, was chosen to contest the seat for the National Party. The Labour Party chose local schoolteacher Leo Sylvester O'Sullivan as their nominee. Previously, Labour had attempted to secure Victoria Cross recipient Jack Hinton to stand as their candidate, who had previously signalled his interest in pursuing a career in politics, however he was unable to be contacted to confirm his candidacy. Robert Henderson, a local pensioner, stood for the Real Democracy Movement who advocated for monetary reform.

== Results ==
The following table gives the election results:

1944 Awarua by-election
Party	Candidate	Votes	%	±%
National	George Herron	4,659	62.40	
Labour	Leo Sylvester O'Sullivan	2,558	34.26	
Real Democracy	Robert Henderson	249	3.33	
Majority		2,101	28.14	
Turnout		7,466		
