= Mayor of Te Kuiti =

The mayor of Te Kuiti officiated over the Te Kuiti Borough in New Zealand, which was administered by the Te Kuiti Borough Council. The office existed from 1910 until 1976, when the borough merged with Waitomo County to form Waitomo District.

== List of mayors ==
The following is a list of the mayors of Te Kuiti.

	Name	Portrait	Term
1	James Boddie		1910–1912
2	Edwin Henry Hardy		1912–1913
(1)	James Boddie		1913–1915
3	Robert Montgomery Somerville		1915–1917
4	George Finlay		1917–1921
5	Hubert Hine		1921–1923
6	Henry Rothery		1923–1927
7	Walter Broadfoot		1927–1935
8	Thomas Carroll		1935–1938
9	Henry Thorne Morton		1938–1944
10	Kenneth William Low		1944–1965
11	John Douglas Bayne		1965–1971
12	Claude Haines		1971–1976
