= George Herron (politician) =

New Zealand politician

George Richard Herron (1888–1967) was a New Zealand politician of the National Party.

== Biography ==
New Zealand Parliament
Years	Term	Electorate	Party
1944–1946	27th	Awarua	National
1946–1949	28th	Awarua	National
1949–1951	29th	Awarua	National
1951–1954	30th	Awarua	National
1954–1957	31st	Awarua	National

Herron was born in Pukerau in 1888. He worked as a blacksmith for five years, before farming for 33 years. He was associated with the Farmers Union, the breeding of Ayrshire cows and the Southland A & P Association.

He represented the Southland electorate of Awarua from 1944 until his retirement in 1957. Herron replaced James Hargest, who had been killed in World War II.

In 1953, Herron was awarded the Queen Elizabeth II Coronation Medal. He died in 1967.

== Notes ==
New Zealand Parliament
Preceded by James Hargest	Member of Parliament for Awarua; 1944–1957	Succeeded by Gordon Grieve
