= 1959 Hamilton by-election =

New Zealand by-election

- 2 May 1959
- Turnout: 13,555 (78.40%)
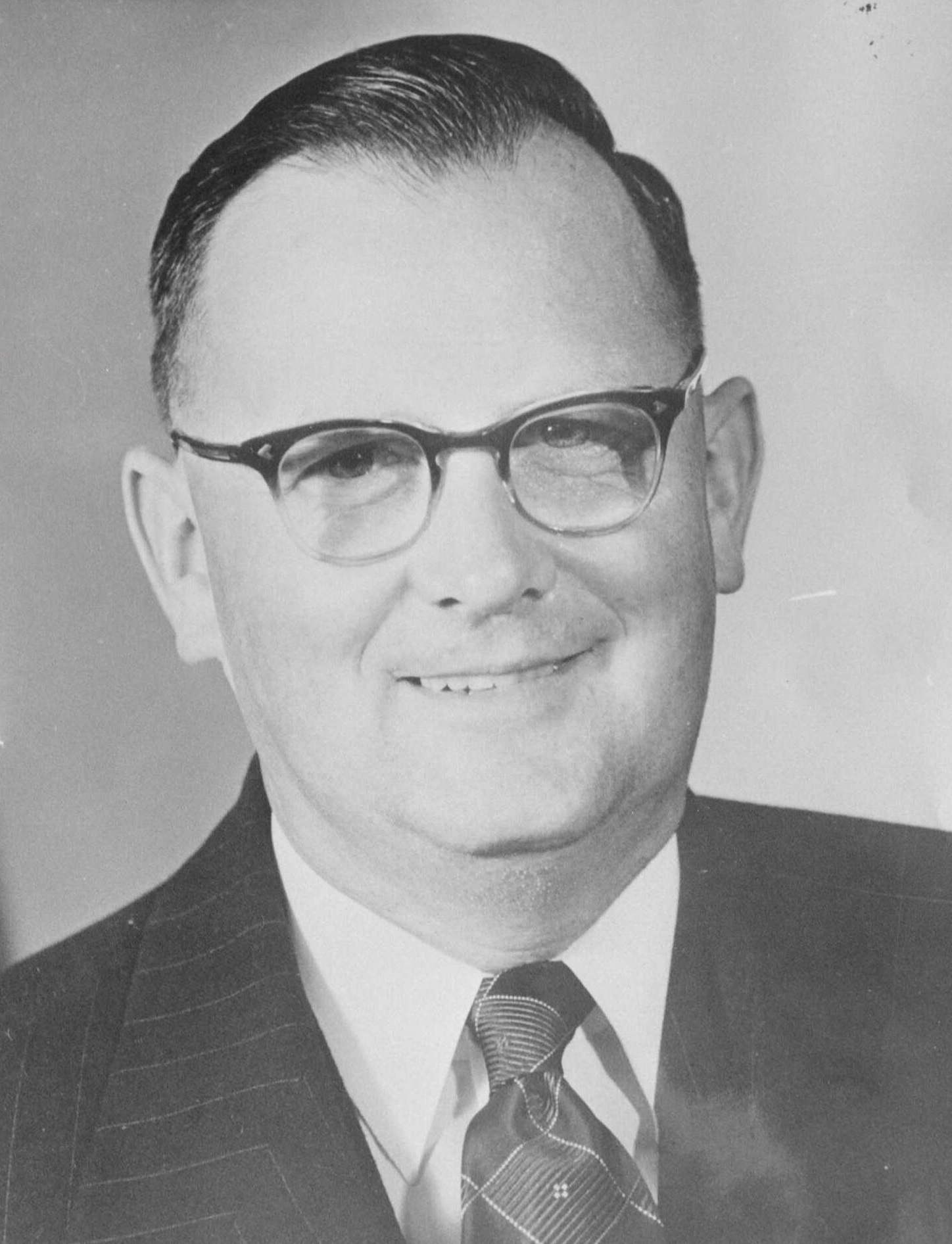

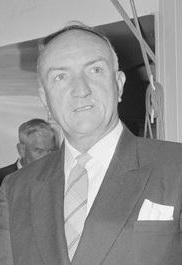
Candidate	Lance Adams-Schneider	Ben Waters
Party	National	Labour
Popular vote	7,832	4,844
Percentage	57.89	35.81
Member before election
Hilda Ross
National
Elected Member
Lance Adams-Schneider
National

The Hamilton by-election 1959 was a by-election held in the Hamilton electorate in Hamilton in the Waikato during the term of the 32nd New Zealand Parliament, on 2 May 1959.

== Background ==
The by-election was caused by the death of incumbent MP Hilda Ross of the National Party on 6 March 1959. The by-election was won by Lance Adams-Schneider, also of the National Party.

== Candidates ==
Labour
There were two candidates for the Labour Party nomination:

- Iris Martin, matron of Wellington Hospital and daughter of former Labour cabinet minister Lee Martin
- Ben Waters, a member of Labour's national executive and candidate for Hamilton in 1951, 1954 and 1957

Labour chose Waters as its candidate. Waters had recently been appointed a trustee of the Waikato Savings Bank. Contesting the seat three times prior, he slightly increased Labour share of the vote from 41.63 to 43.16 percent.

National
There were seven candidates for the National Party nomination:

- Lance Adams-Schneider, a member of the Taumarunui Borough Council and candidate for Hutt in 1957
- Dorothy Blomfield, a member of the Hamilton City Council
- Victor Allan de Lacey, a Hamilton businessman and a member of several National Party executive committees
- Ron Griffiths, a member of the Hamilton City Council and former chairman of the Hamilton National Party
- Francis Dewsbury Pinfold, the chairman of the Hamilton Fire Board and former Mayor of Hamilton
- Deena Sergel, a war widow and candidate for Riccarton in 1957
- Geoffrey Taylor, an Auckland businessman and candidate for Mount Albert in 1957

The local National Party members selected Adams-Schneider as candidate for the seat.

Social Credit
Frederick Charles Roberts, a Hamilton businessman, stood as the candidate for the Social Credit Party. In 1957 he stood for Social Credit in the Raglan electorate.

== Results ==
The following table gives the election results:

1959 Hamilton by-election
Party	Candidate	Votes	%	±%
National	Lance Adams-Schneider	7,832	57.89	
Labour	Ben Waters	4,844	35.81	−7.35
Social Credit	Frederick Charles Roberts	852	6.30	
Majority		2,988	22.09	
Informal votes		27	0.20	
Turnout		13,555	78.40	−13.87
Registered electors		17,289		
National hold		Swing		
