= Jack Hinton =

New Zealand soldier (1909–1997)

Jack Hinton VC
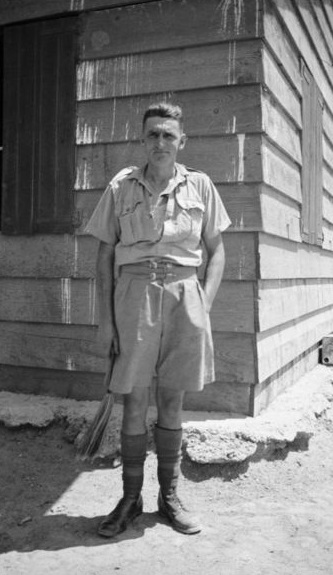
- Sergeant John Hinton, October 1941
- Born: 17 September 1909; Colac Bay, New Zealand
- Died: 28 June 1997 (aged 87); Christchurch, New Zealand
- Burial place: Ruru Lawn Cemetery, Christchurch
- Military career
- Allegiance: New Zealand
- Branch: New Zealand Military Forces
- Service years: 1939–45
- Rank: Sergeant
- Unit: 20th Battalion
- Conflicts: Second World War; Battle of Greece; Battle of Thermopylae
- Awards: Victoria Cross; Mentioned in Despatches
- Other work: Hotel manager Racing steward

John Daniel Hinton, VC (17 September 1909 – 28 June 1997) was a New Zealand soldier who served during the Second World War. He was awarded the Victoria Cross, the highest award for gallantry "in the face of the enemy" that can be awarded to British and Commonwealth forces, for his actions at Kalamata on 29 April 1941 during the Battle of Greece.

Born in 1909, Hinton was a foreman at the Public Works Department when the Second World War began. He volunteered for service abroad with the Second New Zealand Expeditionary Force and was posted to the 20th Battalion. Wounded during the fighting at Kalamata, he was made a prisoner of war and made several escape attempts from camps in Germany. He was freed in April 1945 by advancing American forces. After the war, he managed several hotels and was also involved in horse racing industry until his retirement in 1980. He died in 1997 at the age of 87.

== Early life ==
John Hinton, known as Jack, was born in Colac Bay in Southland, New Zealand, on 17 September 1909, one of seven children of Harry Hinton, a railway man, and Elizabeth Mary. He was educated at local schools and on most days, before starting lessons, would milk a herd of 40 cows. When he was 12, he ran away from home after an argument with his father. He found a job at a grocer's in a nearby town but after a year signed on as a galleyhand aboard a Norwegian whaling ship, which spent the 1921/1922 whaling season in the Southern Ocean. On his return, and after reconciling with his parents, he started working as a shepherd. He soon tired of this and began the life of a swagman, working from town to town as he travelled around the South Island.

Hinton spent most of the next several years on the West Coast working in railway construction, mining for gold, picking fruit, hauling coal, and saw milling. Sport was a passion; he boxed as a lightweight and also ran foot races and played rugby for Hokitika.

In the 1930s, Hinton found regular employment in the Public Works Department, which was building bridges and roads throughout the West Coast. He gained respect for his honesty and hard-working nature and became a foreman in the department. In 1937, he invested his earnings into a pub for which his future wife, Eunice Henriksen, had the lease.

== Second World War ==
At the outbreak of war, Hinton enlisted in the 2nd New Zealand Expeditionary Force (2NZEF), which was being raised for service abroad. He was posted to the 20th Battalion, under the command of Lieutenant Colonel Howard Kippenberger, and based at Burnham Military Camp. One of the older volunteers of the battalion, he was soon promoted to the rank of corporal, and not long after was made a sergeant. The battalion embarked for the Middle East as part of the 4th Infantry Brigade, 2nd New Zealand Division, in January 1940.

Hinton was not always respectful of military authority. Shortly after the New Zealanders arrived in Egypt, he was commanding a squad practising on a rifle range when visited by the division's commander, Major General Bernard Freyberg, who asked him how the men were shooting. "How would you expect them to bloody well shoot?", replied Hinton, "not enough bloody rations, stinking heat and sand". Freyberg asked him to repeat the comment, which he did word for word. Freyberg took note of Hinton's name and instructed him to carry on. There was a subsequent increase in rations, while Hinton was advised by his company commander on how best to speak to senior officers.

=== Battle of Greece ===
In March 1941, the 2nd New Zealand Division was one of several Allied units deployed to Greece to help prepare for an expected invasion by Italian and German troops. When the invasion began on 6 April 1941, the 20th Battalion briefly saw action at Thermopylae before being withdrawn, but Hinton missed this fighting as he was with the division's reinforcement battalion, which was initially based in Athens before it moved to the port of Kalamata. It had been decided that the Allied forces would abandon Greece; at Kalamata, the reinforcement battalion, along with several thousand other, mainly Australian, troops, was awaiting evacuation. On 28 April, the New Zealanders were waiting for transport when advance units of the German 5th Panzer Division began to attack the town with machine-gun fire and self-propelled 6-inch guns.

Hearing gunfire in the distance, Hinton, wanting to assist in the defence of the Allied positions, went to the headquarters of Brigadier Leonard Parrington, the officer in command of the evacuation. Hinton vehemently protested, in strong language, an order from Parrington to surrender. On being threatened with a court-martial for speaking to a senior officer in such a manner, he issued his own threat of proceedings against Parrington for defeatist talk and then left to determine for himself the situation. Other men of the reinforcement battalion were making preparations to move into the town and face the Germans. In the meantime, Hinton had collected his own party of 12 soldiers and led them into the town but came under fire. Ignoring an order from a nearby officer to retreat, he rushed forward to the nearest enemy gun and, hurling two grenades, killed the crew. He continued towards the town's waterfront, clearing out two light machine-gun nests and a mortar with grenades, then dealt with the garrison of a house where some of the enemy were sheltering. He then assisted in the capture of an artillery piece, but shortly after was shot in the stomach, immobilised and captured, one of about 6,000 Allied soldiers made a prisoner of war (POW).

Officially listed as missing in action until August 1941, Hinton spent several weeks in a hospital near Athens until he was well enough to be transferred to a POW camp in Germany. In the meantime, a recommendation for the Victoria Cross (VC) for Hinton was dispatched by Major George Thomson, a medical officer who had witnessed his actions in Kalamata. After an investigation, a decision was made to award Hinton the VC, which was duly gazetted on 14 October 1941. The citation read as follows:

On the night of 28th–29th April, 1941, during the fighting in Greece, a column of German armoured forces entered Kalamata; this column, which contained several armoured cars, 2" guns, and 3" mortars, and two 6" guns, rapidly converged on a large force of British and New Zealand troops awaiting embarkation on the beach. When the order to retreat to cover was given, Serjeant Hinton, shouting "to Hell with this, who'll come with me," ran to within several yards of the nearest gun; the gun fired, missing him, and he hurled two grenades which completely wiped out the crew. He then came on with the bayonet followed by a crowd of New Zealanders. German troops abandoned the first 6" gun and retreated into two houses. Serjeant Hinton smashed the window and then the door of the first house and dealt with the garrison with the bayonet. He repeated the performance in the second house and as a result, until overwhelming German forces arrived, the New Zealanders held the guns. Serjeant Hinton then fell with a bullet wound through the lower abdomen and was taken prisoner.

— London Gazette, No. 35311, 14 October 1941.

=== Prisoner of war ===
The announcement of Hinton's VC was made within a week of Lieutenant Charles Upham, another member of the 20th Battalion, receiving the same award for his actions during the fighting in the Battle of Crete. This prompted a joke that circulated within the battalion: "Join the 20th and get a VC." While a prisoner of war at Stalag IX-C, Hinton made several escape attempts. He was being punished with solitary confinement for one such attempt when his VC was gazetted. He was paraded before his fellow prisoners and presented with a VC ribbon by the camp's commandant before being returned to his cell to complete his punishment.

In 1944, even though a prisoner of war, Hinton was contacted by the International Red Cross to pass on a request from the Labour Party. It asked him to consider standing as their candidate in a by-election in Awarua. He had previously signalled his interest in pursuing a career in politics. However, he was unable to confirm his candidacy in time.

By April 1945, the Allied advance into Germany threatened Hinton's POW camp. The Germans evacuated the camp but Hinton, feigning sickness, remained behind. Once the guards had left, he was able to find keys to the gates and let himself out. He soon made contact with soldiers of the United States 6th Armored Division. Dressed in civilian clothes, he was initially treated with suspicion but soon convinced the Americans of his identity. He borrowed an American uniform and went forward to the frontline with the 44th Infantry Division and assisted in the capture of three villages and rounding up of German POWs. Senior American officers soon found out about Hinton's presence with their troops and sent him to England, where he arrived on 12 April 1945.

Hinton remained in England for over three months, awaiting repatriation to New Zealand. During this time, on 11 May 1945, he received his VC from King George VI at an investiture held at Buckingham Palace. Charles Upham, his comrade from the 20th Battalion, received a bar to his VC at the same ceremony. Transport finally available, Hinton departed for New Zealand in early July and arrived on 4 August 1945.

== Later life and legacy ==
After returning home, Hinton initially was indecisive about what to do with his life. Like many of his fellow soldiers who had returned home, he struggled to adapt to civilian life. He was also extremely uncomfortable with the public attention he received because of his status as a VC recipient. He eventually found work managing hotels on behalf of Dominion Breweries. He was initially based at the Thistle Hotel, a notorious drinking establishment in Auckland, for three years, during which he received a belated mention in despatches for his escape attempts while a POW. In December 1949 he moved to Hamilton to manage the Hamilton East Hotel. This was the first of many moves up and down the country to manage hotels.

During his time as a hotelier, Hinton made several overseas trips, the first of which was to attend the coronation of Queen Elizabeth II. In 1953, he was awarded the Queen Elizabeth II Coronation Medal. He also regularly attended VC and George Cross celebrations, including the VC centenary in 1956. In 1963, Eunice, whom Jack had married following the death of her first husband in the 1950s, died from a heart attack. In 1968, he was married again, to Molly Schumacher, a barmaid at the Onehunga Hotel in Auckland, which Hinton was running at the time. While in Auckland, he was heavily involved in the horse racing industry and acted as a steward at the Auckland Trotting Club.

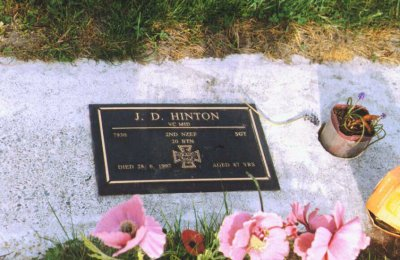
Hinton's grave with headstone at Ruru Lawn Cemetery, in Christchurch

Hinton retired in 1980, and he and Molly moved to Ashburton in the South Island. He spent much of his retirement fishing, and in 1990 shifted to Christchurch to be nearer to Molly's relatives. He died on 28 June 1997, and was honoured with a state funeral with full military honours on 2 July 1997, attended by 800 people. The Chief of General Staff, Major General Piers Reid, delivered a eulogy. The New Zealand Parliament honoured him with a minute's silence at a sitting on 1 July 1997. He was survived by his second wife; he had no children from either of his marriages. He is buried in Christchurch, in the Returned Servicemen's Association section of the Ruru Lawn Cemetery. He is remembered with a plaque in his birthplace of Colac Bay, and the restaurant at the Christchurch Returned Servicemen's Association is named for him.

Hinton's VC was loaned by his family to the Army Museum New Zealand at Waiouru, where it is on display. On 2 December 2007, it was one of nine VCs among a hundred medals stolen from the museum. On 16 February 2008, New Zealand Police announced all the medals had been recovered as a result of a NZ$300,000 reward offered by Michael Ashcroft and Tom Sturgess.
