= Hamilton (New Zealand electorate) =

Hamilton is a former New Zealand parliamentary electorate that existed from 1922 to 1969. The electorate covered the urban area of the city of Hamilton. In 1969, the city was part of two rural electorates, Hamilton East and Waikato. For the 1972 election, the nature of Hamilton East changed to urban, and the Hamilton West electorate complements it to form a second urban electorate.

Five members of parliament have served the Hamilton electorate over its 47 years of existence. Two of them died in office, and both deaths caused by-elections.

== Population centres ==
In the 1922 electoral redistribution, the North Island gained one electorate from the South Island due to faster population growth. The Bruce electorate was abolished, and the Hamilton electorate was created for the first time. For the purposes of the country quota, the initial electorate was classed as two thirds urban and one third rural, and covered the city of Hamilton.

Through an amendment in the Electoral Act in 1965, the number of electorates in the South Island was fixed at 25, an increase of one since the 1962 electoral redistribution. It was accepted that through the more rapid population growth in the North Island, the number of its electorates would continue to increase, and to keep proportionality, three new electorates were allowed for in the 1967 electoral redistribution for the next election. In the North Island, five electorates were newly created and one electorate was reconstituted while three electorates were abolished (including Hamilton). In the South Island, three electorates were newly created and one electorate was reconstituted while three electorates were abolished. The overall effect of the required changes was highly disruptive to existing electorates, with all but three electorates having their boundaries altered. These changes came into effect with the 1969 election.

== History ==
The Hamilton electorate was first used in the 1922 election. The electorate's first representative was Alexander Young of the Reform Party, who had since the 1911 election represented the Waikato electorate, but chose to stand in the new electorate in 1922 instead. Young remained the representative until the 1935 election, when he was defeated by Labour's Charles Barrell. Barrell in turn was defeated in the 1943 election by National's Frank Findlay, who died in office on 31 March 1945.

Findlay's death caused the 1943 by-election, which was won by National's Hilda Ross. Ross died in office on 6 March 1959, and this caused the 1959 by-election, which was won by National's Lance Adams-Schneider. Adams-Schneider served until the end of the term in 1969, when the electorate was abolished. He transferred to the Waikato electorate, which covered the area east of the Waikato River and that was recreated for the 1969 election.

The 1967 electoral redistribution created a new electorate called Hamilton West electorate. Its eastern boundary was the Waikato River, but it incorporated much of the former Waipa electorate, extended to the Tasman Sea, and was thus more rural in nature.

The 1972 electoral redistribution created the Hamilton East electorate and at the same time, the Hamilton West electorate lost its rural hinterland to Raglan. Hence, two urban electorates covered Hamilton for the 1972 election.

=== Members of Parliament ===
Key

Reform Labour National Independent

Election	Winner
1922 election	Alexander Young
1925 election	Alexander Young
1928 election	Alexander Young
1931 election	Alexander Young
1935 election	Charles Barrell
1938 election	Charles Barrell
1943 election	Frank Findlay
1945 by-election	Hilda Ross
1946 election	Hilda Ross
1949 election	Hilda Ross
1951 election	Hilda Ross
1954 election	Hilda Ross
1957 election	Hilda Ross
1959 by-election	Lance Adams-Schneider
1960 election	Lance Adams-Schneider
1963 election	Lance Adams-Schneider
1966 election	Lance Adams-Schneider
(Electorate abolished 1969; see Hamilton West)

== Election results ==
=== 1966 election ===
1966 general election: Hamilton
Party	Candidate	Votes	%	±%
National	Lance Adams-Schneider	7,368	48.66	−5.50
Labour	Bob Reese	5,143	33.96	
Social Credit	Don Bethune	2,629	17.36	+11.50
Majority		2,225	14.69	−2.20
Turnout		15,140	85.29	−3.21
Registered electors		17,750		

=== 1963 election ===
1963 general election: Hamilton
Party	Candidate	Votes	%	±%
National	Lance Adams-Schneider	8,468	54.16	−0.73
Labour	J M Cairns	5,826	37.26	
Social Credit	Don Bethune	917	5.86	−1.59
Liberal	N W Bunting	424	2.71	
Majority		2,642	16.89	−0.35
Turnout		15,635	88.50	−0.39
Registered electors		17,666		

=== 1960 election ===
1960 general election: Hamilton
Party	Candidate	Votes	%	±%
National	Lance Adams-Schneider	8,222	54.89	−3.00
Labour	Sir Basil Arthur	5,639	37.64	
Social Credit	Don Bethune	1,117	7.45	
Majority		2,583	17.24	−4.85
Turnout		14,978	88.89	+10.49
Registered electors		16,849		

=== 1959 by-election ===
1959 Hamilton by-election
Party	Candidate	Votes	%	±%
National	Lance Adams-Schneider	7,832	57.89	
Labour	Ben Waters	4,844	35.81	−7.35
Social Credit	Frederick Charles Roberts	852	6.30	
Majority		2,988	22.09	
Informal votes		27	0.20	
Turnout		13,555	78.40	−13.87
Registered electors		17,289		
National hold		Swing		

=== 1957 election ===
1957 general election: Hamilton
Party	Candidate	Votes	%	±%
National	Hilda Ross	7,721	50.41	+0.81
Labour	Ben Waters	6,611	43.16	+1.79
Social Credit	Robert Gill Young	983	6.41	−2.61
Majority		1,110	7.24	−0.98
Turnout		15,315	92.27	+0.75
Registered electors		16,598		

=== 1954 election ===
1954 general election: Hamilton
Party	Candidate	Votes	%	±%
National	Hilda Ross	8,621	49.60	−8.76
Labour	Ben Waters	7,191	41.37	−0.26
Social Credit	Robert Gill Young	1,568	9.02	
Majority		1,430	8.22	−8.51
Turnout		17,380	91.52	+3.25
Registered electors		18,990		

=== 1951 election ===
1951 general election: Hamilton
Party	Candidate	Votes	%	±%
National	Hilda Ross	7,853	58.36	+2.52
Labour	Ben Waters	5,601	41.63	
Majority		2,252	16.73	+5.02
Turnout		13,454	88.27	−6.10
Registered electors		15,241		

=== 1949 election ===
1949 general election: Hamilton
Party	Candidate	Votes	%	±%
National	Hilda Ross	7,652	55.85	+4.62
Labour	Jack Granville	6,047	44.14	−4.62
Majority		1,605	11.71	+9.24
Turnout		13,699	94.37	+1.77
Registered electors		14,515		

=== 1946 election ===
1946 general election: Hamilton
Party	Candidate	Votes	%	±%
National	Hilda Ross	6,778	51.23	+2.36
Labour	Jack Granville	6,451	48.76	
Majority		327	2.47	−5.33
Turnout		13,229	92.60	+23.41
Registered electors		14,285		

=== 1945 by-election ===
1945 Hamilton by-election
Party	Candidate	Votes	%	±%
National	Hilda Ross	6,772	48.87	
Labour	Charles Barrell	5,691	41.07	−4.13
Democratic Labour	John A. Lee	1,229	8.87	
Independent	Douglas Seymour	163	1.17	
Informal votes		58	0.41	−0.63
Majority		1,081	7.80	
Turnout		13,855	69.19	−23.02
Registered electors		20,022		

=== 1943 election ===
1943 general election: Hamilton (Note: Registered electors refers to civilian voters only; nationwide, 93,295 servicemen also cast valid votes although their names did not appear on electoral rolls.)
Party	Candidate	Votes	%	±%
National	Frank Findlay	7,660	48.04	
Labour	Charles Barrell	7,206	45.20	−11.65
Democratic Labour	Alfred E. Allen	885	5.55	
Real Democracy	William Henry Thompson	193	1.21	
Majority		454	2.85	
Informal votes		167	1.04	+0.40
Turnout		16,111	92.21	−1.10
Registered electors		17,473		

Table footnotes:

=== 1938 election ===
1938 general election: Hamilton
Party	Candidate	Votes	%	±%
Labour	Charles Barrell	7,722	56.85	+11.32
National	Albert William Grant	5,862	43.15	
Majority		1,860	13.69	+2.25
Informal votes		88	0.64	
Turnout		13,672	93.31	
Registered electors		14,653		

=== 1935 election ===
1935 general election: Hamilton
Party	Candidate	Votes	%	±%
Labour	Charles Barrell	5,534	45.53	
Reform	Alexander Young	4,141	34.07	−31.10
Democrat	Harold David Caro	2,479	20.39	
Majority		1,391	11.44	
Turnout		12,152		

=== 1931 election ===
1931 general election: Hamilton
Party	Candidate	Votes	%	±%
Reform	Alexander Young	5,874	65.17	+20.36
Labour	Hubert Beebe	2,579	28.61	
Independent	Charles Lafferty	561	6.22	
Majority		3,295	36.55	+25.94
Informal votes		94	1.03	−0.22
Turnout		9,108	74.58	−9.13
Registered electors		12,213		

=== 1928 election ===
1928 general election: Hamilton
Party	Candidate	Votes	%	±%
Reform	Alexander Young	4,529	44.81	
Liberal–Labour	Samuel Charles Lye	3,456	34.19	
Labour	Bill Schramm	2,123	21.00	
Majority		1,073	10.62	
Informal votes		128	1.25	
Turnout		10,236	83.71	
Registered electors		12,228		
