= Frank Findlay =

New Zealand politician

Frank Findlay (1884 – 31 March 1945) was a New Zealand politician of the National Party.

New Zealand Parliament
Years	Term	Electorate	Party
1943–1945	27th	Hamilton	National

Findlay was born in Aberdeen, Scotland, in 1884. He emigrated to New Zealand in 1902. In his younger days, he was a successful athlete, including the champion for decathlon and high and long jump in Northland. From 1921, he was a baker in Hamilton and belonged to the Presbyterian church, where he was an elder. He was active with the YMCA.

He was on the Hamilton Borough Council for 12 years and served as Deputy Mayor for some time. In the 1943 election, he defeated the incumbent, Charles Barrell from Labour, in the Hamilton electorate. He suffered a heart attack while playing tennis and died in Waikato Hospital some days later on 31 March 1945. He died while holding office as an MP. His death caused a by-election that was won by Hilda Ross.

New Zealand Parliament
Preceded by Charles Barrell	Member of Parliament for Hamilton; 1943–1945	Succeeded by Hilda Ross
