= Alexander Young (New Zealand politician) =

New Zealand politician (1875–1956)

The Honourable Sir Alexander Young KCVO
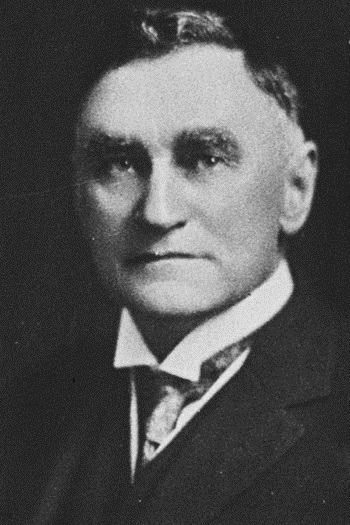

9th Minister of Health
- In office 22 September 1931 – 6 December 1935
- Prime Minister: George Forbes
- Preceded by: Arthur Stallworthy
- Succeeded by: Peter Fraser
- In office 18 January 1926 – 10 December 1928
- Prime Minister: Gordon Coates
- Preceded by: Maui Pomare
- Succeeded by: Arthur Stallworthy

Member of the New Zealand Parliament for Hamilton
- In office 7 December 1922 – 27 November 1935
- Succeeded by: Charles Barrell

Member of the New Zealand Parliament for Waikato
- In office 14 December 1911 – 7 December 1922
- Preceded by: Henry Greenslade
- Succeeded by: Frederick Lye

16th Mayor of Hamilton
- In office May 1909 – May 1912
- Preceded by: James Bond
- Succeeded by: Arthur Manning

Personal details
- Born: 23 March 1875 Auckland, New Zealand
- Died: 17 April 1956 (aged 81)

Sir James Alexander Young KCVO (23 March 1875 – 17 April 1956), known as Alexander Young, was a New Zealand politician of the Reform Party.

== Biography ==
New Zealand Parliament
Years	Term	Electorate	Party
1911–1914	18th	Waikato	Reform
1914–1919	19th	Waikato	Reform
1919–1922	20th	Waikato	Reform
1922–1925	21st	Hamilton	Reform
1925–1928	22nd	Hamilton	Reform
1928–1931	23rd	Hamilton	Reform
1931–1935	24th	Hamilton	Reform

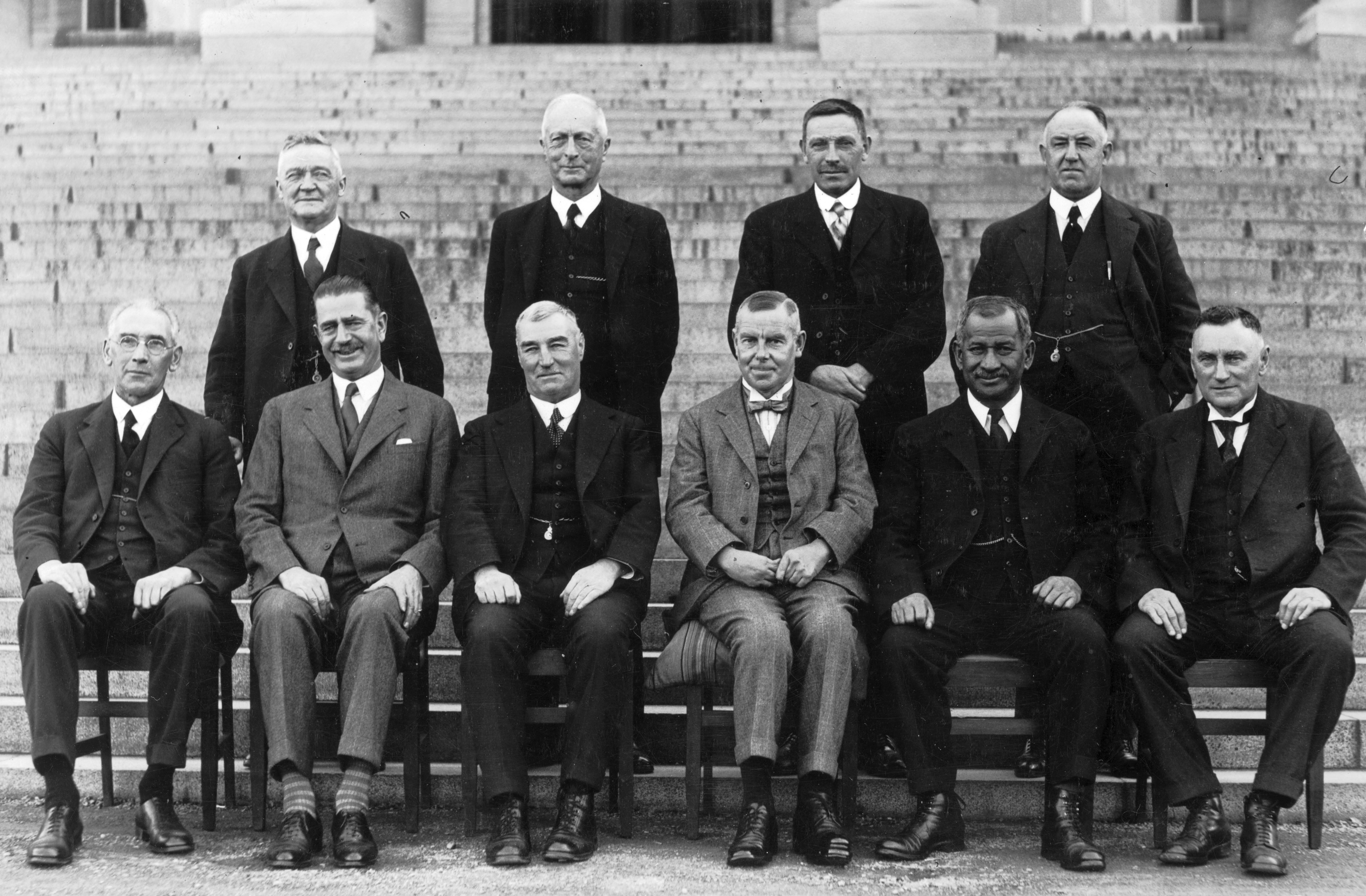
Forbes Coalition Ministry in 1931, including Young (front right)

Young was born in Auckland in 1875 to Irish immigrant parents from County Sligo. He was by profession a dentist. He was elected to the Hamilton Borough Council at the young age of 22. He was Mayor of Hamilton from 1909 to 1912.

He then represented the Waikato electorate from 1911 to 1922, and then the Hamilton electorate from 1922 to 1935, when he was defeated.

He was Minister of Health (18 January 1926 – 10 December 1928) and Minister of Industries and Commerce (28 November 1928 – 10 December 1928) in the Coates Ministry of the Reform Government of New Zealand. He was Minister of Health (22 September 1931 – 6 December 1935), Minister of Immigration (22 September 1931 – 6 December 1935) and Minister of Internal Affairs (28 January 1933 – 6 December 1935) in the United Government.

He was Chairman of Committees from 24 July 1923 to 14 October 1925.

In 1935, Young was appointed a Knight Commander of the Royal Victorian Order and was awarded the King George V Silver Jubilee Medal.

He was vice-president of the New Zealand Alliance in 1929, and was on the Waikato Licensing Bench for fourteen years. He was on the Board of Governors of Hamilton High School and chairman of the Hospital Board.

He died in 1956 and was buried at the Hamilton East Cemetery.

== Notes ==
Political offices
Preceded by James Bond	Mayor of Hamilton; 1909–1912	Succeeded by Arthur Manning
Preceded by Alexander Malcolm	Chairman of Committees of the House of Representatives; 1923–1925	Succeeded by Frank Hockly
Preceded by Māui Pōmare	Minister of Health; 1926–1928 1931–1935	Succeeded by Arthur Stallworthy
Preceded by Arthur Stallworthy	Minister of Health; 1926–1928 1931–1935	Succeeded by Peter Fraser
New Zealand Parliament
Preceded by Henry Greenslade	Member of Parliament for Waikato; 1911–1922	Succeeded by Frederick Lye
New constituency	Member of Parliament for Hamilton; 1922–1935	Succeeded by Charles Barrell
