= James Shiner Bond =

Printer, newspaper owner, and mayor

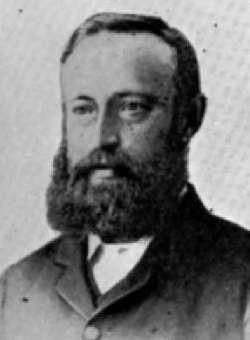
- James Shiner Bond in 1902

15th Mayor of Hamilton
- In office May 1905 – May 1909
- Preceded by: William Dey
- Succeeded by: Alexander Young

Personal details
- Born: 12 December 1858 Beaminster
- Died: 26 November 1922 (aged 63) Hamilton, New Zealand
- Spouse(s): Sarah Annie O'Connor (m. 1881) Ellen Graham (m. 1905)
- Occupation: Printer

James Shiner Bond (1858–1922) was a printer, newspaper owner and served as mayor of Cambridge, New Zealand, and then as mayor of Hamilton.

== Personal and business life ==
James was the eldest son of Alfred Bond and Sarah, née Shiner, born on 12 December 1858 in Beaminster. He started as an apprentice printer when he was 13. James arrived at Whanganui in 1878, working as a job printer at the Rangitikei Advocate. In 1880 he moved to Cambridge, where he was printer at the Waikato Mail.

James married Sarah Annie O’Connor on 1 May 1881 and they had 9 children, among them were:

- Alfred James, (born 1885) and Augustine (born 4 August 1890), who sailed with the 16th Waikato Regiment on 16 October 1914. Augustine was killed in the Gallipoli landing on 25 April 1915. Alfred returned in 1918, after being wounded and gassed, and, in 1919, married Ada Ring. Patricia was one of their children. Alfred continued the family stationery business until he died on 15 April 1928. He was buried in Hamilton East Cemetery.
- Francis Cecil farmed at Rotokauri.
- Fred C, born on 5 January 1884, published a directory. He survived the war and being sunk when the Wimmera hit a mine in 1918.
- Percy was wounded in France in 1916.

Sarah died on 20 April 1902. James married Ellen Octavia Graham on 29 March 1905 at Ponsonby and had three more children.

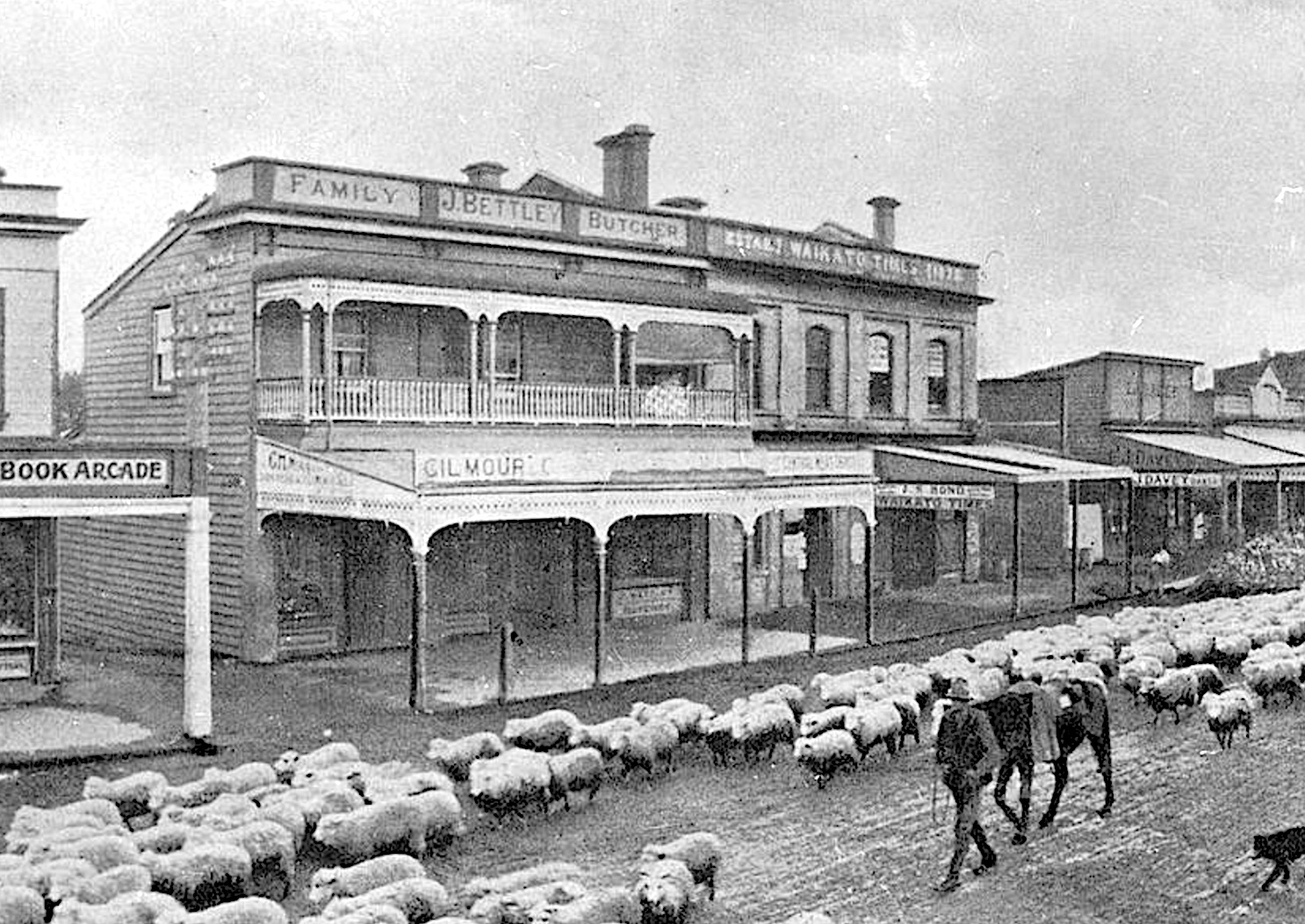
Waikato Times and J S Bond store in 1906

In 1881 he started the Atlas Printing Company which also sold books and stationery. It was affected by a large fire in Cambridge in 1889. In July 1895 James started the Waikato Advocate, a weekly journal, which bought the masthead and property of the Waikato Times from the Bank of New Zealand in 1896. The previous owner, George Edgecumbe, was given a fortnight to give up possession. He set up a rival Waikato Argus and took the files, advertising contacts and subscriber lists, leaving James with the building, membership of the Press Association and a printing press. James began publishing the Waikato Times every evening, rather than 3 mornings a week. In 1898 a large fire cracked the windows of his stationery shop at the Waikato Times. In 1902 he sold the Waikato Times to Paull & Venables and was presented with a desk by his employees. From 1898 to 1919 he was the Hamilton agent for the Public Trustee Office. He retired to Remuera in 1920.

He died at Remuera on 26 November 1922 and was buried at Waikumete Cemetery.

Bond Street in Hamilton East was named after him by its developer.

== Public life ==
James joined the Duke of Cambridge Lodge on 5 April 1887. He was on Cambridge Borough Council for 9 years, including being mayor from 22 November 1892, re-elected unopposed in 1894 and serving until 1895. He was elected to Hamilton Borough Council in 1900 and 1901, being elected unopposed as mayor in April 1905 and 1906 and elected again in 1907 and 1908, serving until May 1909 and again elected as a councillor in 1913. He was also on the Waikato Licensing Committee from 1894, president of the Winter Show Association, the Waikato Agricultural and Pastoral Association, chairman of Waikato Hospital Board and, when the Hamilton High School Board of Governors was first constituted in 1911, he took a seat on the Board. He was a member of the Auckland Harbour Board, on the Auckland Board of Education, chairman of directors of the Theatre Royal Company, Ltd and active in the Church of England. Shortly before he died he was elected to the Auckland Grammar School Board.
