= Awarua (electorate) =

Awarua was a New Zealand parliamentary electorate from 1881 to 1996.

== Population centres ==
The previous electoral redistribution was undertaken in 1875 for the 1875–1876 election. In the six years since, New Zealand's European population had increased by 65%. In the 1881 electoral redistribution, the House of Representatives increased the number of European representatives to 91 (up from 84 since the 1875–76 election). The number of Māori electorates was held at four. The House further decided that electorates should not have more than one representative, which led to 22 new electorates being formed, including Awarua, and two electorates that had previously been abolished to be recreated. This necessitated a major disruption to existing boundaries.

This electorate was in the rural part of Southland. In its original form, it covered the area around the town of Invercargill, which had its own electorate. Bluff fell into Awarua, and all of Stewart Island / Rakiura. On the mainland, Awarua had taken area from Riverton (which was abolished) and from Mataura (which moved to the east and north). Stewart Island had previously belonged to Wallace.

== History ==
The electorate was established in 1881. It was represented by the Prime Minister, Sir Joseph Ward from 1887 to 1919. Philip De La Perrelle announced his retirement due to ill health in August 1935. He died within days of the 1935 election and was succeeded by James Hargest.

In the 1996 election, the first MMP election, the electorate was absorbed into the adjacent Invercargill electorate.

=== Members of Parliament ===
Key

Independent Liberal Reform United National Labour

Election	Winner
1881 election	James Joyce
1884 election	James Joyce
1887 election	Joseph Ward
1890 election	Joseph Ward
1893 election	Joseph Ward
1896 election	Joseph Ward
1897 by-election	Joseph Ward
1899 election	Joseph Ward
1902 election	Joseph Ward
1905 election	Joseph Ward
1908 election	Joseph Ward
1911 election	Joseph Ward
1914 election	Joseph Ward
1919 election	John Hamilton
1922 election	Philip De La Perrelle
1925 election	John Hamilton
1928 election	Philip De La Perrelle
1931 election	Philip De La Perrelle
1935 election	James Hargest^{1}
1938 election	James Hargest^{1}
1943 election	James Hargest^{1}
1944 by-election	George Herron
1946 election	George Herron
1949 election	George Herron
1951 election	George Herron
1954 election	George Herron
1957 election	Gordon Grieve
1960 election	Gordon Grieve
1963 election	Gordon Grieve
1966 election	Gordon Grieve
1969 election	Hugh Templeton
1972 election	Aubrey Begg
1975 election	Rex Austin
1978 election	Rex Austin
1981 election	Rex Austin
1984 election	Rex Austin
1987 election	Jeff Grant
1990 election	Jeff Grant
1993 election	Eric Roy
(Electorate abolished in 1996; see Invercargill)

^{1}James Hargest was originally an independent supporter of the Reform Party. He joined the National Party in 1936.

== Election results ==
=== 1963 election ===
1963 general election: Awarua
Party	Candidate	Votes	%	±%
National	Gordon Grieve	7,869	55.2	−1.7
Labour	Noel Valentine	4,496	31.6	
Social Credit	D McNaughton	1,194	8.4	+0.2
Liberal	Robin James Egerton	691	4.8	
Majority		3,373	23.6	+1.6
Turnout		16,301	87.9	+0.3

=== 1944 by-election ===
1944 Awarua by-election
Party	Candidate	Votes	%	±%
National	George Herron	4,659	62.40	
Labour	Leo Sylvester O'Sullivan	2,558	34.26	
Real Democracy	Robert Henderson	249	3.33	
Majority		2,101	28.14	
Turnout		7,466		

=== 1935 election ===
1935 general election: Awarua
Party	Candidate	Votes	%	±%
Independent	James Hargest (Note: James Hargest ran as an independent, but was aligned to the Reform Party)	3,651	41.32	
Labour	Thomas Francis Doyle	2,701	30.57	
Democrat	L. A. Neiderer (Note: Neiderer was a former chairman of the Southland County Council)	2,182	24.70	
Independent	Norman MacIntyre	301	3.41	
Majority		950	10.75	
Informal votes		140	1.56	
Turnout		8,975	94.14	
Registered electors		9,534		

Table footnotes:

=== 1931 election ===
1931 general election: Awarua
Party	Candidate	Votes	%	±%
United	Philip De La Perrelle	4,645	65.04	+10.38
Independent	Norman McIntyre	2,497	34.96	
Majority		2,148	30.08	+17.47
Informal votes		134	1.84	+0.95
Turnout		7,276	83.82	−9.98
Registered electors		8,681		

=== 1928 election ===
1928 general election: Awarua
Party	Candidate	Votes	%	±%
United	Philip De La Perrelle	4,358	54.66	+6.09
Reform	John Hamilton	3,353	42.05	−9.37
Labour	William Denham	262	3.29	
Majority		1,005	12.61	+9.75
Informal votes		72	0.89	+0.49
Turnout		8,045	93.80	−0.25
Registered electors		8,577		

=== 1925 election ===
1925 general election: Awarua
Party	Candidate	Votes	%	±%
Reform	John Hamilton	3,962	51.43	+2.81
Liberal	Philip De La Perrelle	3,742	48.57	−0.76
Majority		220	2.86	+2.14
Informal votes		31	0.40	
Turnout		7,704	94.04	+4.39
Registered electors		8,192		

=== 1922 election ===
1922 general election: Awarua
Party	Candidate	Votes	%	±%
Liberal	Philip De La Perrelle	3,531	49.33	
Reform	John Hamilton	3,480	48.62	
Independent	Norman McIntyre	147	2.05	
Majority		51	0.71	
Turnout		7,158	89.65	
Registered electors		7,984		

=== 1919 election ===
1919 general election: Awarua
Party	Candidate	Votes	%	±%
Reform	John Hamilton	3,164	55.99	+18.16
Liberal	Sir Joseph Ward	2,407	42.59	−19.57
Informal votes		80	1.41	+0.74
Majority		757	13.39	
Turnout		5,651	81.46	+1.57
Registered electors		6,937		

=== 1914 election ===
1914 general election: Awarua
Party	Candidate	Votes	%	±%
Liberal	Sir Joseph Ward	3,132	62.16	+8.51
Reform	John Hamilton	1,906	37.83	−4.18
Informal votes		34	0.67	+0.85
Majority		1,226	24.33	+12.69
Turnout		5,038	83.03	+3.68
Registered electors		6,067		

=== 1911 election ===
1911 general election: Awarua, First ballot
Party	Candidate	Votes	%	±%
Liberal	Sir Joseph Ward	2,893	53.65	−11.27
Reform	John Hamilton	2,265	42.01	
Independent	William Morris	152	2.81	−15.93
Informal votes		82	1.52	−2.22
Majority		628	11.64	−34.18
Turnout		5,392	86.71	+5.06
Registered electors		6,218		

=== 1908 election ===
1908 general election: Awarua, First ballot
Party	Candidate	Votes	%	±%
Liberal	Sir Joseph Ward	3,069	64.92	−16.76
Independent	William Morris	886	18.74	
Conservative	Alfred Snowball	595	12.58	
Informal votes		177	3.74	+2.24
Majority		2,183	46.18	−18.69
Turnout		4,727	81.65	−1.74
Registered electors		5,789		

=== 1905 election ===
1905 general election: Awarua
Party	Candidate	Votes	%	±%
Liberal	Sir Joseph Ward	3,586	81.68	+6.31
Independent	Henry Woodnorth	738	16.82	
Informal votes		66	1.50	
Majority		2,848	64.87	+14.12
Turnout		4,390	83.39	−6.70
Registered electors		5,264		

=== 1902 election ===
1902 general election: Awarua
Party	Candidate	Votes	%	±%
Liberal	Sir Joseph Ward	2,795	75.37	−2.55
Independent	David Whyte	913	24.63	
Majority		1,882	50.75	
Turnout		3,708	76.69	+0.32
Registered electors		4,835		

=== 1899 election ===
1899 general election: Awarua
Party	Candidate	Votes	%	±%
Liberal	Joseph Ward	2,417	77.92	+14.06
Conservative	W. T. Murray	685	22.08	
Majority		1,732	55.83	+28.12
Turnout		3,102	76.37	
Registered electors		4,062		

=== 1897 by-election ===
1897 Awarua by-election
Party	Candidate	Votes	%	±%
Liberal	Joseph Ward	2,066	69.42	+5.82
Conservative	Cuthbert Cowan	910	30.58	−5.82
Turnout		2,976		
Majority		1,156	38.84	+11.65

=== 1896 election ===
1896 general election: Awarua
Party	Candidate	Votes	%	±%
Liberal	Joseph Ward	1,836	63.60	
Conservative	Cuthbert Cowan	1,051	36.40	
Turnout		2,887	72.68	
Majority		785	27.19	
Registered electors		3,887		

=== 1893 election ===
1893 general election: Awarua
Party	Candidate	Votes	%	±%
Liberal	Joseph Ward	Unopposed		
Registered electors		3,129		

=== 1890 election ===
1890 general election: Awarua
Party	Candidate	Votes	%	±%
Liberal	Joseph Ward	Unopposed		
Registered electors		2,158		

=== 1887 election ===
1887 general election: Awarua
Party	Candidate	Votes	%	±%
Independent	Joseph Ward	660	50.84	
Independent	George Froggatt	401	30.89	
Independent	James Walker Bain	237	18.25	
Majority		259	19.95	
Turnout		1,298	62.46	
Registered electors		2,078		

=== 1884 election ===
1884 general election: Awarua
Party	Candidate	Votes	%	±%
Independent	James Joyce	398	43.54	
Independent	John Lyon McDonald	311	34.03	
Independent	Andrew Kinross	74	8.10	
Independent	John Walker Mitchell	67	7.33	
Independent	Thomas Hodgkinson	64	7.00	
Majority		87	9.52	
Turnout		914		
