= Henry Thorne Morton =

New Zealand politician

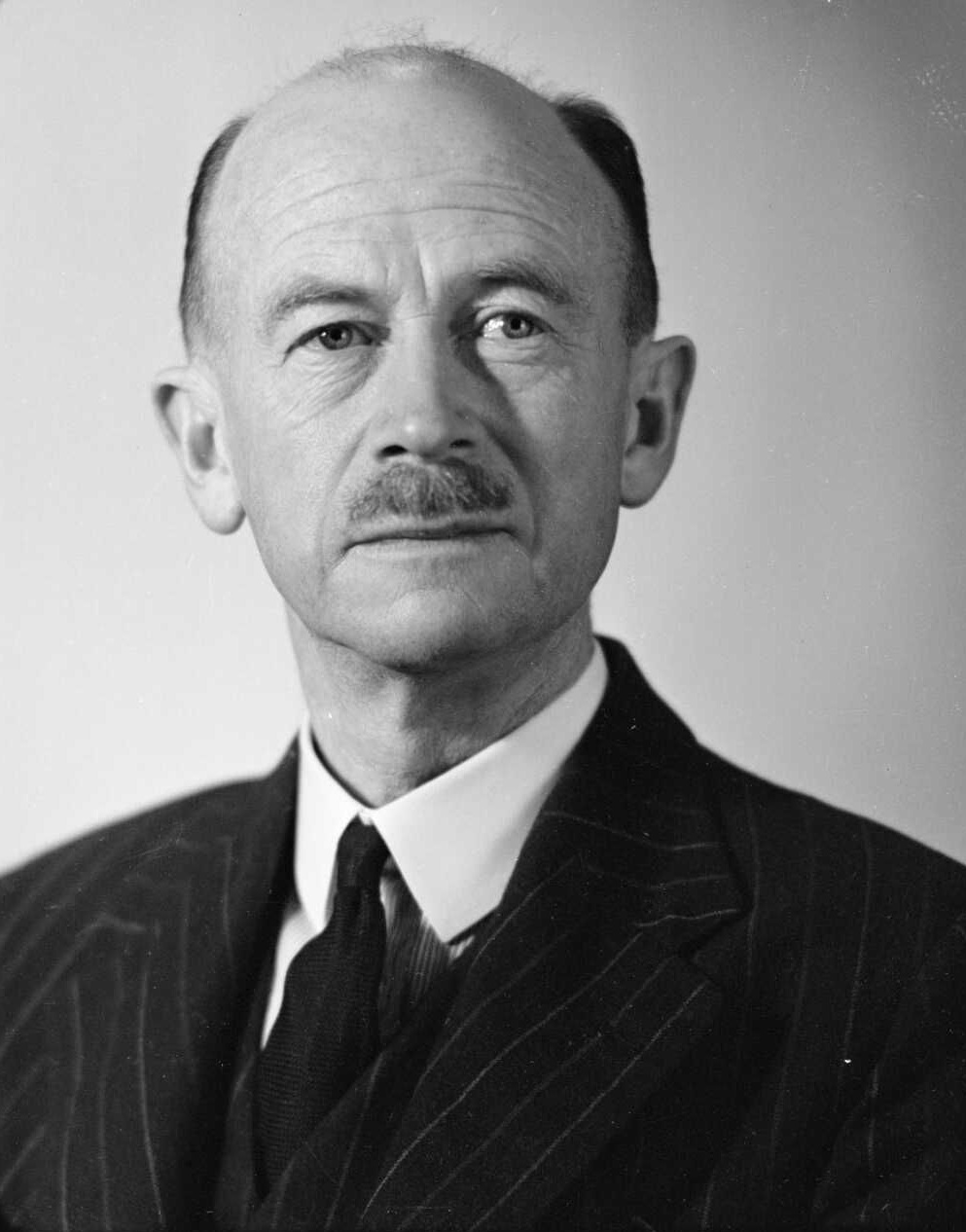
- Morton in the 1940s

Member of the New Zealand Parliament for Waitemata
- In office 25 September 1943 – 27 November 1946
- Preceded by: Mary Dreaver

Personal details
- Born: 18 December 1888 Auckland, New Zealand
- Died: 8 December 1966 (aged 77) Auckland, New Zealand
- Party: National
- Profession: Solicitor

Henry Thorne Morton (18 December 1888 – 8 December 1966) was a New Zealand politician of the National Party.

== Biography ==
New Zealand Parliament
Years	Term	Electorate	Party
1943–1946	27th	Waitemata	National

Morton was born on 18 December 1888 at Auckland. He received his education at King's College, Auckland and Emmanuel College, Cambridge. He served in World War I where he was severely wounded. He obtained a Master of Arts degree with honours at the University of Cambridge. He later lived in the King Country town of Te Kūiti where he was in practice as a solicitor.

From 1938 to 1944 Morton was mayor of Te Kuiti. He represented the Waitemata electorate from 1943 to 1946. In 1946, the Waitemata electorate was abolished, and he was defeated for the new North Shore electorate by Martyn Finlay.

Morton died on 8 December 1966 in Auckland.

== Notes ==
New Zealand Parliament
Preceded by Mary Dreaver	Member of Parliament for Waitemata; 1943–1946	Vacant Constituency abolished, recreated in 1954 Title next held by Norman King
