= Charles Barrell =

New Zealand politician

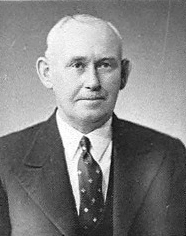

Member of the New Zealand Parliament for Hamilton
- In office 27 November 1935 – 25 September 1943
- Preceded by: Alexander Young
- Succeeded by: Frank Findlay

Personal details
- Born: Charles Abraham Barrell; 2 September 1880 Rangiora, New Zealand
- Died: 14 January 1958 (aged 77) Auckland, New Zealand
- Party: Labour
- Spouse: Annie Jane Malvina Quinlon
- Children: 3

Charles "Charlie" Abraham Barrell (2 September 1880 – 14 January 1958) was a New Zealand politician of the Labour Party.

== Biography ==
=== Early life and career ===
Barrell was born in Rangiora in 1880. He became a farmer but later found employment with the New Zealand Railways Department and eventually qualified as an engineer. In 1902 he married Annie Jane Malvina Quinlon. He then was the manager of branches of Booth Macdonald and Co., Ltd at New Plymouth, Auckland and Invercargill. He then became the Town Clerk and Harbourmaster at Kawhia in the Waikato. He then left Kawhia and moved to Hamilton.

=== Political career ===
New Zealand Parliament
Years	Term	Electorate	Party
1935–1938	25th	Hamilton	Labour
1938–1943	26th	Hamilton	Labour

He represented the Hamilton electorate from 1935, when he defeated Sir Alexander Young of the Reform Party. In the 1938 election, he defeated Albert William Grant of the National Party. In 1943, he was defeated by National's Frank Findlay. He unsuccessfully contested the Hamilton seat again in a 1945 by-election.

In 1940 he was appointed a member of the Auckland Harbour Board to fill a vacancy, but chose not to stand for re-election in 1941 stating that the war effort was taking a heavy demand on his time and he could not give warranted attention to the board's affairs.

Barrell was a Social Crediter and later became the president of the Hamilton Social Credit Association.

=== Later life and death ===
In later life he was the patron of the Waikato Trotting Club.

He died in Auckland on 14 January 1958, aged 77. He was survived by his wife, son and two daughters.

== Notes ==
New Zealand Parliament
Preceded by Alexander Young	Member of Parliament for Hamilton; 1935–1943	Succeeded by Frank Findlay
