= 1943 New Zealand general election =

- 24 (Māori) & 25 September (general) 1943

All 80 seats in the New Zealand Parliament 41 seats were needed for a majority
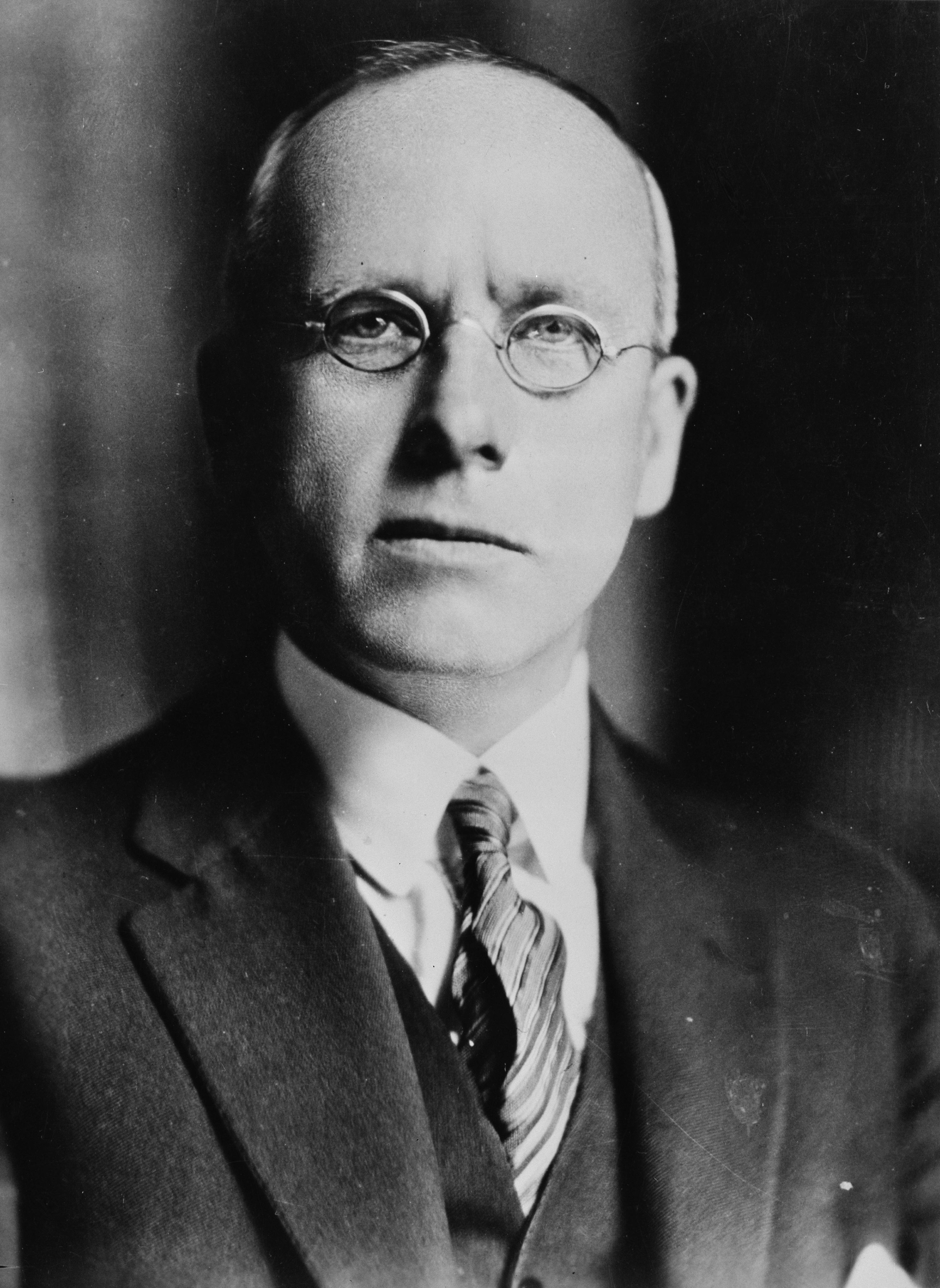

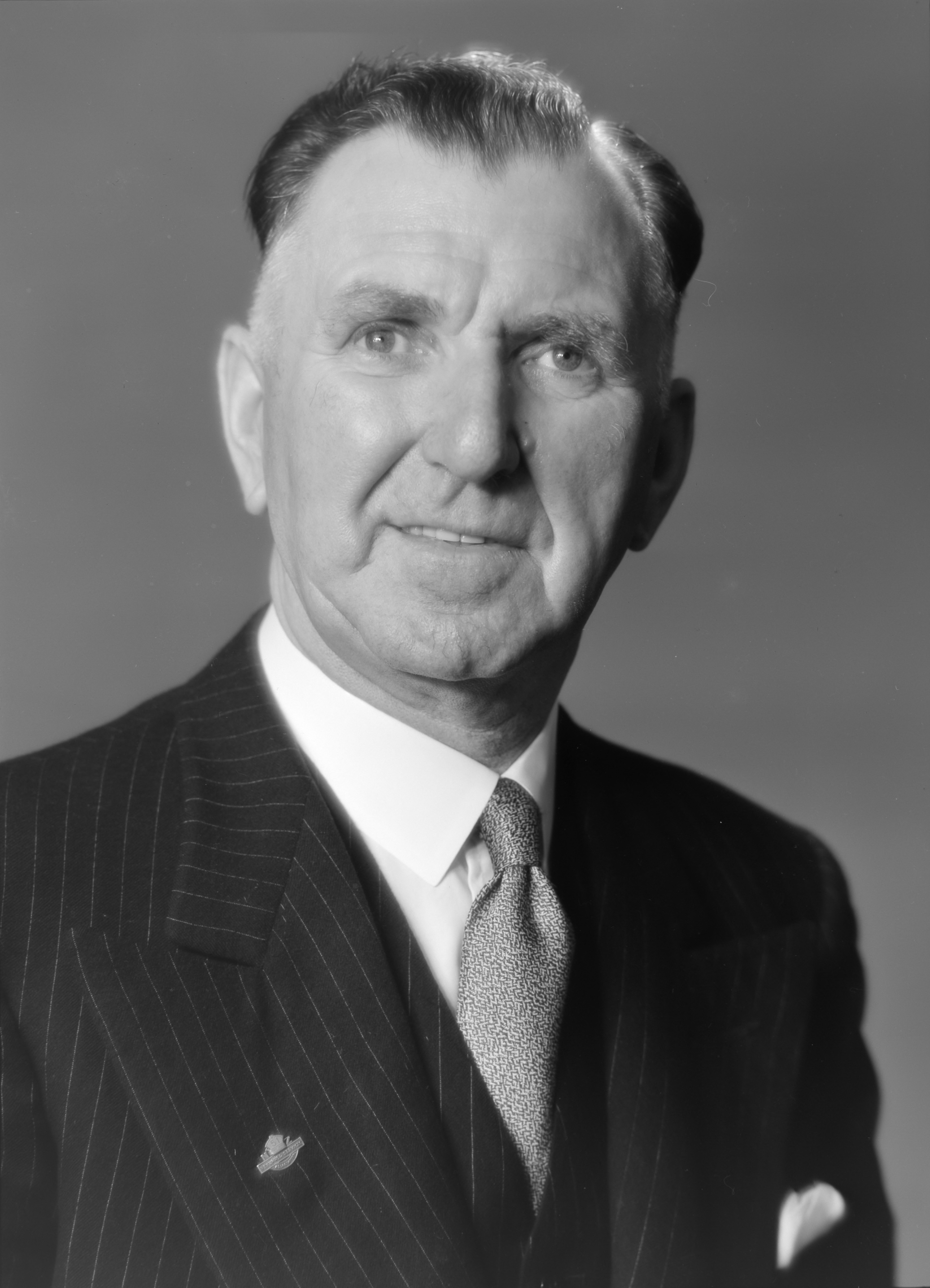
| | First party | Second party |
|---|---|---|
| Leader | Peter Fraser | Sidney Holland |
| Party | Labour | National |
| Leader since | 4 April 1940 | 26 November 1940 |
| Leader's seat | Wellington Central | Christchurch North |
| Last election | 53 seats, 55.8% | 25 seats, 40.3% |
| Seats won | 45 | 34 |
| Seat change | ▼8 | ▲9 |
| Popular vote | 447,919 | 402,887 |
| Percentage | 47.6% | 42.8% |
| Swing | ▼8.2% | ▲2.5% |
- Results of the election.
Prime Minister before election
Peter Fraser
Labour
Subsequent Prime Minister
Peter Fraser
Labour

The 1943 New Zealand general election was a nationwide vote to determine the shape of the New Zealand Parliament's 27th term. With the onset of World War II, elections were initially postponed, but it was eventually decided to hold a general election in September 1943, around two years after it would normally have occurred. The election saw the governing Labour Party re-elected by a comfortable margin, although the party nevertheless lost considerable ground to the expanding National Party.

== Background ==
The Labour Party had formed its first government after its resounding victory in the 1935 elections and had been re-elected by a substantial margin in the 1938 elections. Michael Joseph Savage, the first Labour Prime Minister, died in 1940; he was replaced by Peter Fraser, who was widely viewed as competent even if he was less popular than Savage. In the same year as Fraser took power, however, the opposition National Party had replaced the ineffectual Adam Hamilton with Sidney Holland, and was beginning to overcome the internal divisions that had plagued Hamilton's time as leader.

As World War II continued, the issues surrounding it naturally came to dominate political debate. Shortages appeared, prompting a certain amount of dissatisfaction with the government. The matter of conscription was also contentious — although both Labour and National supported it, many traditional followers of Labour were angry at their party's stance. Many early Labour leaders, including Fraser, had been jailed for opposing conscription in World War I, and were branded hypocrites for later introducing it; Fraser justified his change of position by saying that World War I was a pointless war but that World War II was necessary. A faction of Labour, dissatisfied with the mainstream party's economic and conscription policies, followed dissident MP John A. Lee to his new Democratic Labour Party.

A general election was due to be held in 1941, but Fraser, who held a tight rein over the coalition war cabinet, persuaded Parliament to postpone it due to the war.

=== MPs retiring in 1943 ===
Five National MPs, two Labour MPs and two independent MPs intended to retire at the end of the Parliament.

| Party | Name | Electorate |
|---|---|---|
| Labour | Gervan McMillan | Dunedin West |
| Labour | Lee Martin | Raglan |
| National | John Cobbe | Manawatu |
| National | Harold Dickie | Patea |
| National | George Forbes | Hurunui |
| National | Mary Grigg | Mid-Canterbury |
| National | Alfred Ransom | Pahiatua |
| Independent | Bert Kyle | Riccarton |
| Independent | Charles Wilkinson | Egmont |

Bill Endean also left parliament at the election. He intended to stand again in Remuera but was deselected as a candidate by the National Party.

== By-elections ==
During April and May 1943, there were three deaths of sitting members:

- Paraire Karaka Paikea – Northern Maori – died on 6 April
- Alfred Ransom – Pahiatua – died on 22 May
- Gordon Coates – Kaipara – died on 27 May

This would have required three by-elections in a year where the government was planning to hold a general election, and in fact, the writ for the Northern Maori by-election was issued on 19 May. On 11 June, the government announced that a general election would be held in September, and at the same time they introduced legislation that postponed the three by-elections. The By-elections Postponement Act 1943 was passed, and amongst other things it revoked the writ issued for the Northern Maori by-election. This was the first time that legislation had been used to postpone by-elections (it happened once more in 1969).

== The election ==
The date for the main 1943 election was 25 September, a Saturday. The election to the four Māori electorates was held the day before. 1,021,034 civilians and an uncertain number of serving military personnel were registered to vote — special legislation provided voting rights to all serving members of the armed forces regardless of age, and they voted over several days prior to 25 September. Among the civilian population, there was a turnout of 82.8%. The number of seats in Parliament was 80, a number that had been fixed since 1902.

There were three minor movements participating with 45 candidates: the People's Movement or Independent People's Group (25), the Real Democracy Movement (17) and the Fighting Forces League (3). However these groups got only 12,867 votes (provisional count: PM or IPG 7,389 (0.89%); RDM 4,421 (0.53%); others or FFL 1,057 (0.13%)). Two of the three Fighting Forces League candidates were also supported by the Real Democracy Movement, which had been formed by the Social Credit Association.

Two seats were uncontested: Awarua and Matarura. Both seats were held for the National Party by serving officers; James Hargest (Awarua) was interned in Switzerland, and Tom Macdonald (Mataura) had just been invalided home. Labour did not contest those two electorates or Nelson where Harry Atmore stood. National did not contest three electorates: Kaipara and Palmerston North where Independent Nationalists stood, or Buller. 1943 was the last general election when some candidates were elected unopposed.

With seamen's and servicemen's votes taking time to come in, it took until mid-October before all results were finalised. Initially, the outcome in at least ten electorates was in doubt: Oamaru, Eden, Raglan, New Plymouth, Otaki, Wairarapa, Waitemata, Hamilton, Nelson, and Motueka. In its 27 September edition, The New Zealand Herald posted profiles of new members of parliament. This included National's T. R. Beatty, a building contractor from Oamaru who had supposedly beaten Arnold Nordmeyer, a sitting cabinet minister. In initial results, Beatty had a majority of just six votes, but incumbents had strong support by military staff, and Nordmeyer had a final majority of 125 votes.

== Election results ==
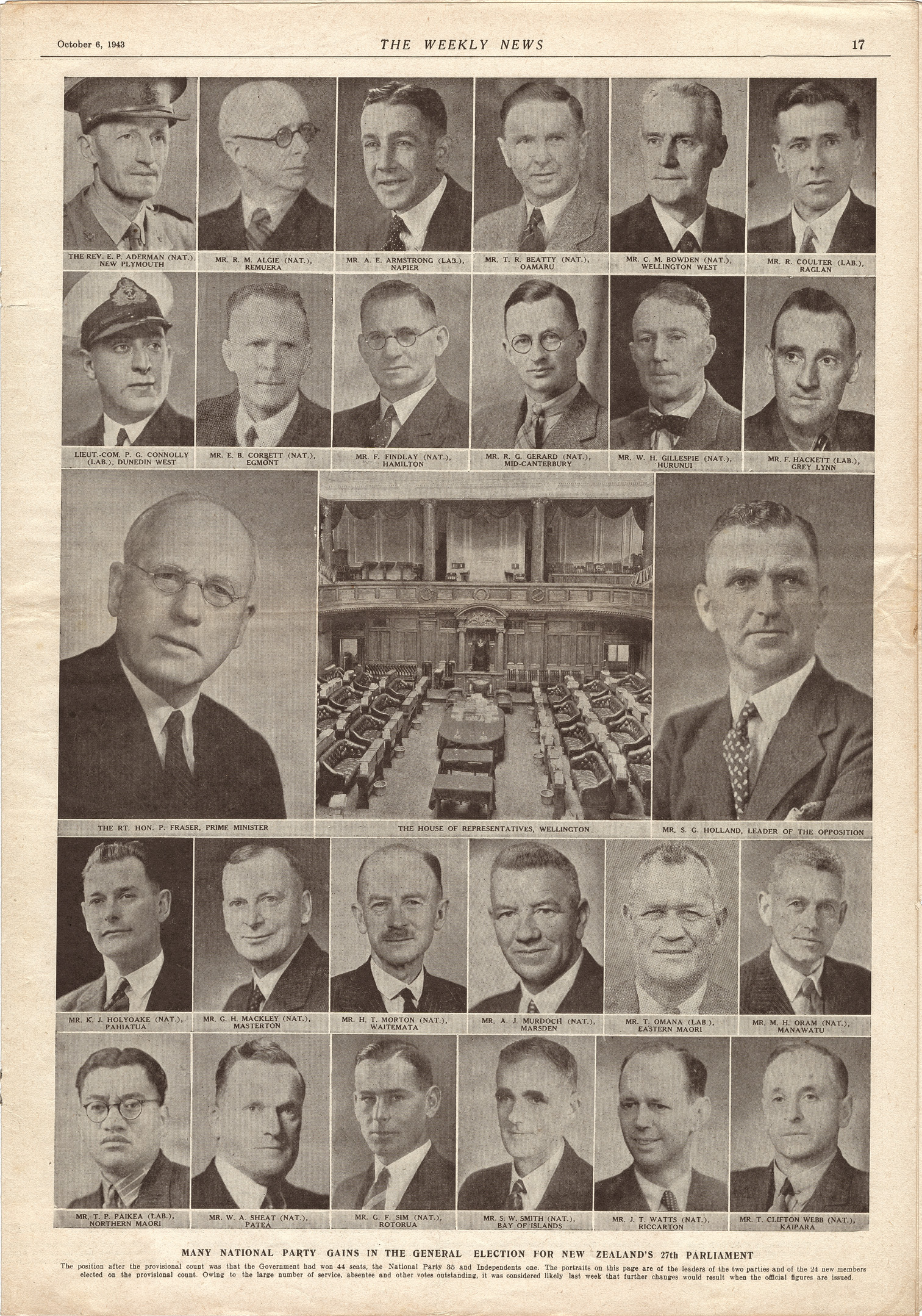
The leaders of National and Labour, plus the 24 new MPs following the 1943 general election

The 1943 election saw the governing Labour Party retain office by a ten-seat margin, winning forty-five seats to the National Party's thirty-four, with one independent. The popular vote was considerably closer — Labour won 47.6%, while National won 42.8%. Holland was stunned by the result, and called for a Commission of Inquiry to look at the servicemens' vote, but was answered by a report from the Chief Electoral Officer. The Labour vote dropped, particularly in rural areas where the now more prosperous farmers returned to their normal political allegiance. There were strikes by the miners, and resentment at wartime restrictions. Lee's "Democratic Soldier Labour" party took votes in closely contested seats, and there was a "vast and weird variety of miscellaneous candidates under strange labels". However the forces vote favoured both Labour and Democratic Soldier Labour, see table below. And 22 seats were won on a minority vote.

On the morning of election day, overseas counts from London, Ottawa and the Middle East indicated a majority for Labour, but domestic results coming in during the evening suggested to several government officials and even to Walter Nash thal Labour would lose. By 10.30 pm only 35 of the 80 seats were certain for Labour, with Barclay (Marsden) defeated and even Nordmeyer (Oamaru) uncertain. But with 73,000 servicemens' votes that came in during the day, Lowry (Otaki), Hodgens (Palmerston North) and Roberts (Wairarapa) scraped in. Over subsequent days with 60,000 special votes plus over 20,000 more servicemens' votes, both Nordmeyer and Anderton (Eden) also scraped in. Fraser, who had campaigned among the troops, quipped that it was not only North Africa that the Second Division had saved. By 7 October, National's lead in four seats had been overturned by the services votes, and by 12 October, it was apparent that the result in six seats (Eden, Nelson, Oamaru, Otaki, Palmerston North and Wairarapa) had been overturned by the services vote.

John A. Lee's new Democratic Labour Party won only 4.3% of the vote, and no seats. Bill Barnard and Colin Scrimgeour were formerly on the Labour left. Barnard had left the Labour Party with John A. Lee but had fallen out with him and left Lee's Democratic Labour Party, standing as an independent. Scrimgeour stood as an independent against Prime Minister Peter Fraser in Wellington Central and polled well, reducing Fraser's majority so that Fraser only sneaked back on a minority vote.

Albert Davy the organiser of the Independent People's Group (IPG) or People's Movement complained that the election was decided on "strictly party" lines, and said that the effect of the Democratic Labour Party standing was to give six seats to the National Party.

Two defeated Labour MPs, James Barclay and Charles Boswell, were appointed to diplomatic posts in Australia and Russia, respectively.

The election was also notable for the defeat of Āpirana Ngata a renowned Māori statesman and member for Eastern Maori after 38 years in parliament, by Rātana–Labour candidate Tiaki Omana. Labour now held all four Māori electorates and would continue to do so until 1993.

One independent was re-elected: Harry Atmore from Nelson — this was the last electoral victory by a candidate not from the major parties until the 1966 election. Atmore had the tactical support of Labour who (as in 1935 and 1938) did not stand a candidate against him, and he generally voted with Labour. The slight margin to National in Nelson on civilian votes was reversed by the service votes.

=== Party standings ===
Election results
| Party | Candidates | Votes | Percentage | Seats won | change |
|---|---|---|---|---|---|
| Labour | 77 | 447,919 | 47.56 | 45 | -8 |
| National | 77 | 402,887 | 42.78 | 34 | +9 |
| Democratic Labour | 54 | 40,443 | 4.29 | 0 | ±0 |
| People's Movement | 25 | 7,389 | 0.89 | 0 | ±0 |
| Real Democracy | 25 | 4,421 | 0.53 | 0 | ±0 |
| Independents | 38 | 38,789 | 3.95 | 1 | -1 |
| Total | 291 | 941,828 | | 80 | |

=== Votes summary ===
Popular Vote
| Labour | 47.60% |
| National | 42.80% |
| Democratic Labour | 4.30% |
| Independent | 3.90% |
| Others | 1.50% |

Parliament seats
| Labour | 56.25% |
| National | 42.50% |
| Independent | 1.25% |

=== Initial MPs ===
The table below shows the results of the 1943 general election:

Key

Labour National Democratic Labour Real Democracy Independent

Electorate results for the 1943 New Zealand general election
| Electorate | Incumbent | Winner | Majority | Runner up |
|---|---|---|---|---|
General electorates
| Auckland Central | Bill Parry | | 4,769 | William George Stanley Swabey |
| Auckland East | Bill Schramm | | 962 | Harry Tom Merritt |
| Auckland Suburbs | Rex Mason | | 3,028 | Thomas Augustus Bishop |
| Auckland West | Peter Carr | | 5,402 | John W. Kealy |
| Avon | Dan Sullivan | | 4,460 | James Neil Clarke |
| Awarua | James Hargest | | Uncontested | |
| Bay of Islands | Charles Boswell | Sidney Walter Smith | 1,276 | Charles Boswell |
| Bay of Plenty | Bill Sullivan | | 1,679 | Walter William Jonasen |
| Buller | Paddy Webb | | 4,635 | Edward William Nicolaus |
| Central Otago | William Bodkin | | 2,723 | James McIndoe Mackay |
| Christchurch East | Mabel Howard | | 5,537 | Reginald Gilbert Brown |
| Christchurch North | Sidney Holland | | 2,645 | George Manning |
| Christchurch South | Robert Macfarlane | | 4,416 | Ron Guthrey |
| Clutha | James Roy | | 1,587 | Herbert Kerr Edie |
| Dunedin Central | Peter Nielson | | 2,155 | Leonard James Tobin Ireland |
| Dunedin North | Jim Munro | | 2,798 | Alexander Cassie |
| Dunedin South | Fred Jones | | 3,061 | David Murdoch |
| Dunedin West | Gervan McMillan | Phil Connolly | 1,338 | Alexander Smith Falconer |
| Eden | Bill Anderton | | 14 | Wilfred Fortune |
| Egmont | Charles Wilkinson | Ernest Corbett | 2,422 | Edwin Thoms Cox |
| Franklin | Jack Massey | | 3,285 | Aaron Best |
| Gisborne | David Coleman | | 572 | Harry Barker |
| Grey Lynn | John A. Lee | Fred Hackett | 6,059 | John A. Lee |
| Hamilton | Charles Barrell | Frank Findlay | 454 | Charles Barrell |
| Hauraki | Andy Sutherland | | 2,723 | Edmund Colin Nigel Robinson |
| Hawke's Bay | Ted Cullen | | 1,636 | Eric N. Pryor |
| Hurunui | George Forbes | William Gillespie | 1,566 | James William Morgan |
| Hutt | Walter Nash | | 5,260 | John H. Hogan |
| Invercargill | William Denham | | 987 | William Bell |
| Kaiapoi | Morgan Williams | | 761 | Harold Overton |
| Kaipara | Gordon Coates | Clifton Webb | 2,800 | John Stewart |
| Lyttelton | Terry McCombs | | 1,374 | Ted Taylor |
| Manawatu | John Cobbe | Matthew Oram | 2,305 | William Henry Oliver (Note: Father of the historian W. H. Oliver) |
| Marlborough | Ted Meachen | | 450 | Tom Shand |
| Marsden | Jim Barclay | Alfred Murdoch | 1,006 | Jim Barclay |
| Masterton | John Robertson | Garnet Mackley | 494 | John Robertson |
| Mataura | Tom Macdonald | | Uncontested | |
| Mid-Canterbury | Mary Grigg | Geoff Gerard | 634 | David Barnes |
| Motueka | Jerry Skinner | | 301 | John Robert Haldane |
| Napier | Bill Barnard | Tommy Armstrong | 1,273 | Morris Spence |
| Nelson | Harry Atmore | | 191 | Frederick William Huggins |
| New Plymouth | Fred Frost | Ernest Aderman | 1,276 | Fred Frost |
| Oamaru | Arnold Nordmeyer | | 125 | Thomas Ross Beatty |
| Onehunga | Arthur Osborne | | 3,324 | John Park |
| Otahuhu | Charles Petrie | | 464 | Gordon Hamilton |
| Otaki | Leonard Lowry | | 191 | Bert Cooksley |
| Pahiatua | Alfred Ransom | Keith Holyoake | 1,825 | George Anders Hansen |
| Palmerston North | Joe Hodgens | | 212 | Gus Mansford |
| Patea | Harold Dickie | William Sheat | 912 | Alex Langslow |
| Raglan | Lee Martin | Robert Coulter | 108 | Robert James Glasgow |
| Rangitikei | Edward Gordon | | 1,612 | Robert Freeman |
| Remuera | Bill Endean | Ronald Algie | 4,183 | Martyn Finlay |
| Riccarton | Bert Kyle | Jack Watts | 1,322 | Harold Denton |
| Roskill | Arthur Richards | | 962 | Roy McElroy |
| Rotorua | Alexander Moncur | Geoffrey Sim | 715 | Alexander Moncur |
| Stratford | William Polson | | 2,059 | Brian Richmond |
| Tauranga | Frederick Doidge | | 3,625 | Dudley A. Hill |
| Temuka | Jack Acland | | 1,690 | George Harris |
| Thames | Jim Thorn | | 935 | William Alexander Clark |
| Timaru | Clyde Carr | | 1,701 | Jack Satterthwaite |
| Waikato | Stan Goosman | | 4,615 | Charles Croall |
| Waimarino | Frank Langstone | | 1,404 | Roger Oswald Montgomerie |
| Waipawa | Cyril Harker | | 2,091 | Archie Low |
| Wairarapa | Ben Roberts | | 151 | Jimmy Maher |
| Waitaki | David Campbell Kidd | | 821 | John S. Adams |
| Waitemata | Mary Dreaver | Henry Thorne Morton | 321 | Mary Dreaver |
| Waitomo | Walter Broadfoot | | 1,881 | Ben Waters |
| Wallace | Adam Hamilton | | 1,607 | John James Lynch |
| Wanganui | Joe Cotterill | | 2,437 | Eric James Kirk |
| Wellington Central | Peter Fraser | | 1,206 | Will Appleton |
| Wellington East | Bob Semple | | 2,588 | Len Jacobsen |
| Wellington North | Charles Chapman | | 1,897 | Thomas Hislop |
| Wellington South | Robert McKeen | | 4,156 | Ernest Toop |
| Wellington Suburbs | Harry Combs | | 2,581 | Bill Veitch |
| Wellington West | Catherine Stewart | Charles Bowden | 1,183 | Catherine Stewart |
| Westland | James O'Brien | | 2,600 | Frank Chivers |
Māori electorates
| Eastern Maori | Āpirana Ngata | Tiaki Omana | 240 | Āpirana Ngata |
| Northern Maori | Paraire Karaka Paikea | Tapihana Paraire Paikea | 2,438 | Eru Moka Pou |
| Southern Maori | Eruera Tirikatene | | 558 | John Piuraki Tikao-Barrett |
| Western Maori | Toko Ratana | | 3,309 | Pei Te Hurinui Jones |

Table footnotes:
