= Hilda Ross =

New Zealand politician (1883–1959)

The Honourable Dame Hilda Ross DBE CStJ
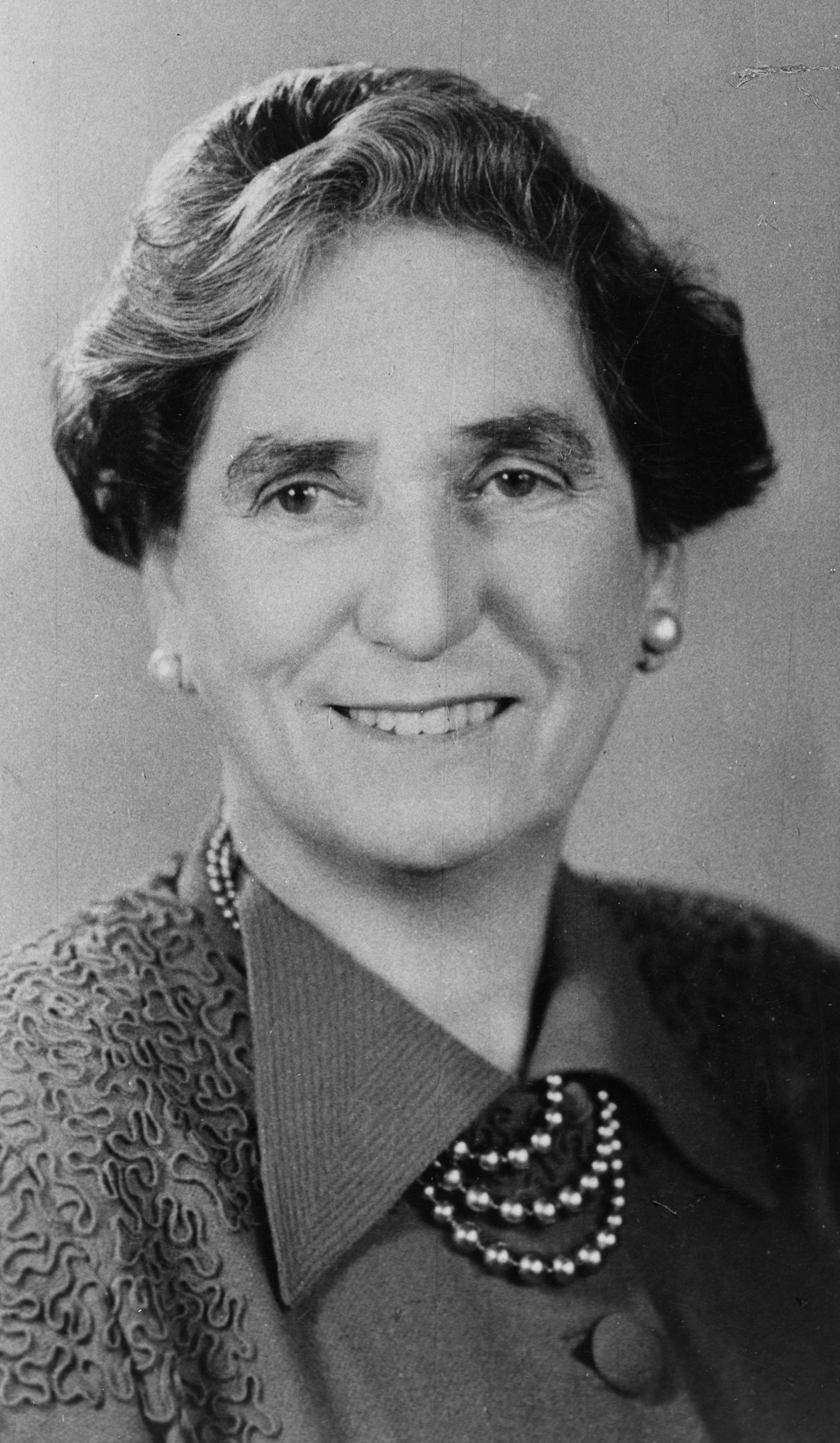
- Hilda Ross, c.1951

Member of the New Zealand Parliament for Hamilton
- In office 1945–1959
- Preceded by: Frank Findlay
- Succeeded by: Lance Adams-Schneider

Personal details
- Born: Grace Hilda Cuthbertha Nixon; 6 July 1883 Auckland, New Zealand
- Died: 6 March 1959 (aged 75) Hamilton, New Zealand
- Party: National
- Spouse: Harry Campbell Manchester Ross (m. 1904; died 1940)

Dame Grace Hilda Cuthbertha Ross DBE CStJ (née Nixon; 6 July 1883 – 6 March 1959), known as Hilda Ross, was a New Zealand politician for the National Party and an activist.

== Early years ==
Nixon was born in Auckland to Adam (a fireman who later became a marine engineer) and Zillah (Johnson) Nixon. Her family lived in both Sydney and Auckland, and she received her education in these cities. She trained as a music teacher and later conducted the Hamilton City Choral Operatic Society.

== Family ==
In 1904, she married Harry Campbell Manchester Ross (died 1940) in Auckland. Her husband founded a furnishing company, "Barton and Ross". They had four sons, including twins who died in infancy. The twins were born in 1907 and survived only a few days but were baptised.

== Political career ==
New Zealand Parliament
Years	Term	Electorate	Party
1945–1946	27th	Hamilton	National
1946–1949	28th	Hamilton	National
1949–1951	29th	Hamilton	National
1951–1954	30th	Hamilton	National
1954–1957	31st	Hamilton	National
1957–1959	32nd	Hamilton	National

Her first elected posts were the Waikato Hospital Board (1941) and the Hamilton Borough Council (1944). She was Deputy Mayor of Hamilton in 1945. Following the death of the incumbent MP for Hamilton, Frank Findlay, she won the 1945 by-election to represent the electorate in the New Zealand Parliament, where she remained until her death 14 years later in 1959. As MP, she held various posts in the First National Government, including Member of the Executive Council (1949–1957), Minister of Social Security (1957), Minister of Welfare of Women and Children (1949–1957), and Minister of Child Welfare (1954–1957).

== Later life ==
In 1952, Ross was appointed as a Commander of the Order of St John. In 1953, she was awarded the Queen Elizabeth II Coronation Medal. Ross was appointed a Dame Commander of the Order of the British Empire in the 1956 New Year Honours. She died on 6 March 1959 in Hamilton.

== Quote ==
- "The Country is today enjoying so much prosperity that married women with children should wake up to their responsibilities in the home and stay at home".

== Legacy ==
- Dame Hilda Ross Memorial Arts Centre & Dame Hilda Ross Memorial Arts Centre Appeal
- A statue of Ross was erected in Hamilton in 2020.

== Gallery ==
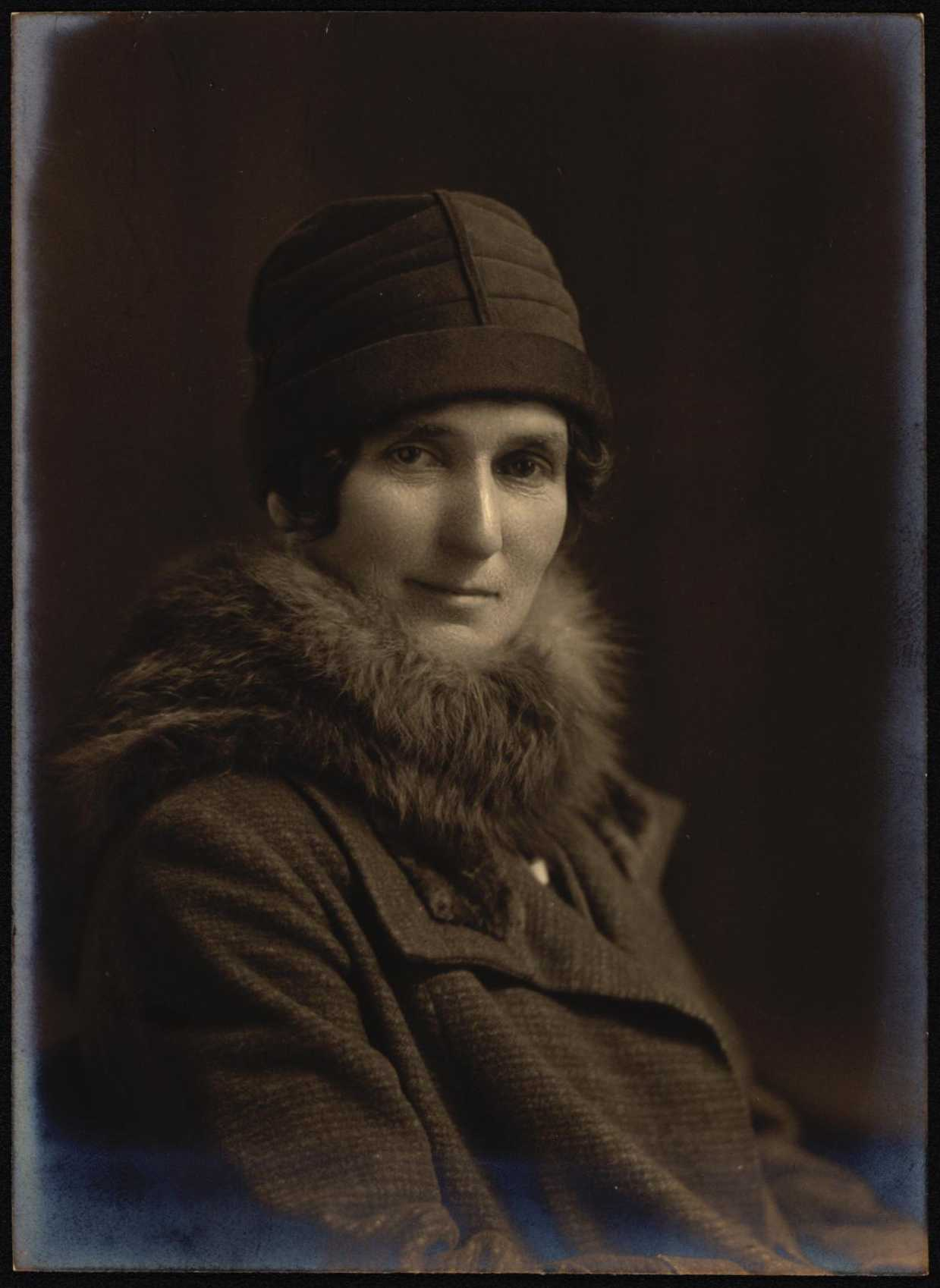
Dame Hilda Ross passport photo (1927)

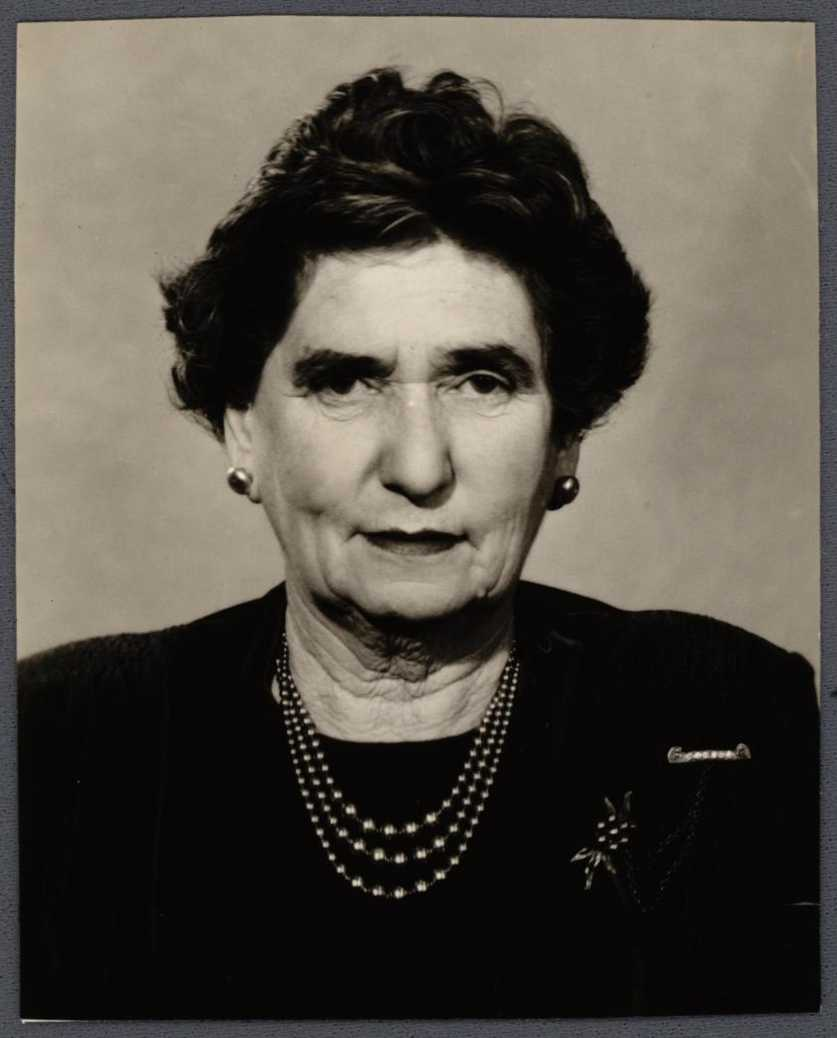
Dame Hilda Ross passport photo (1952)

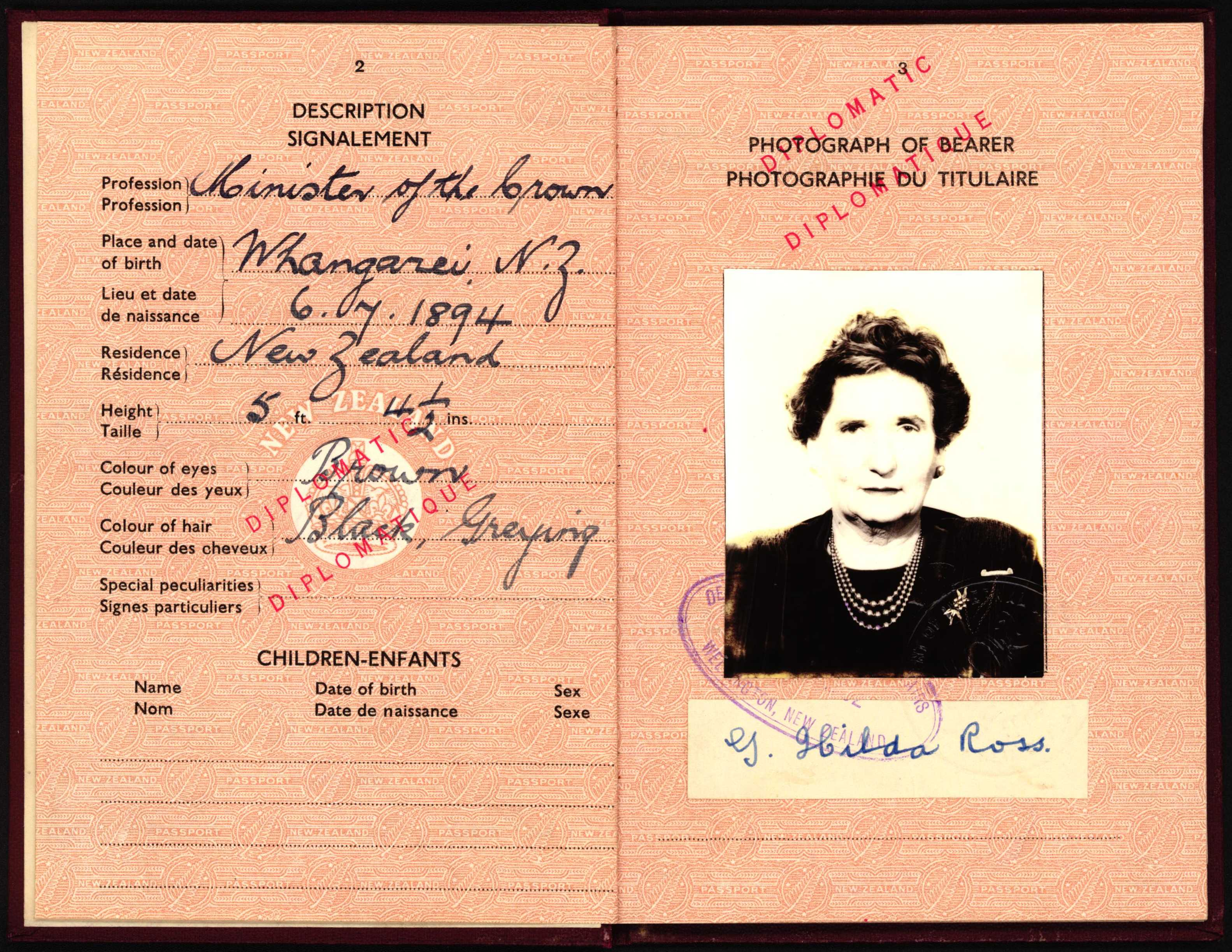
Dame Hilda Ross diplomatic passport (1952)

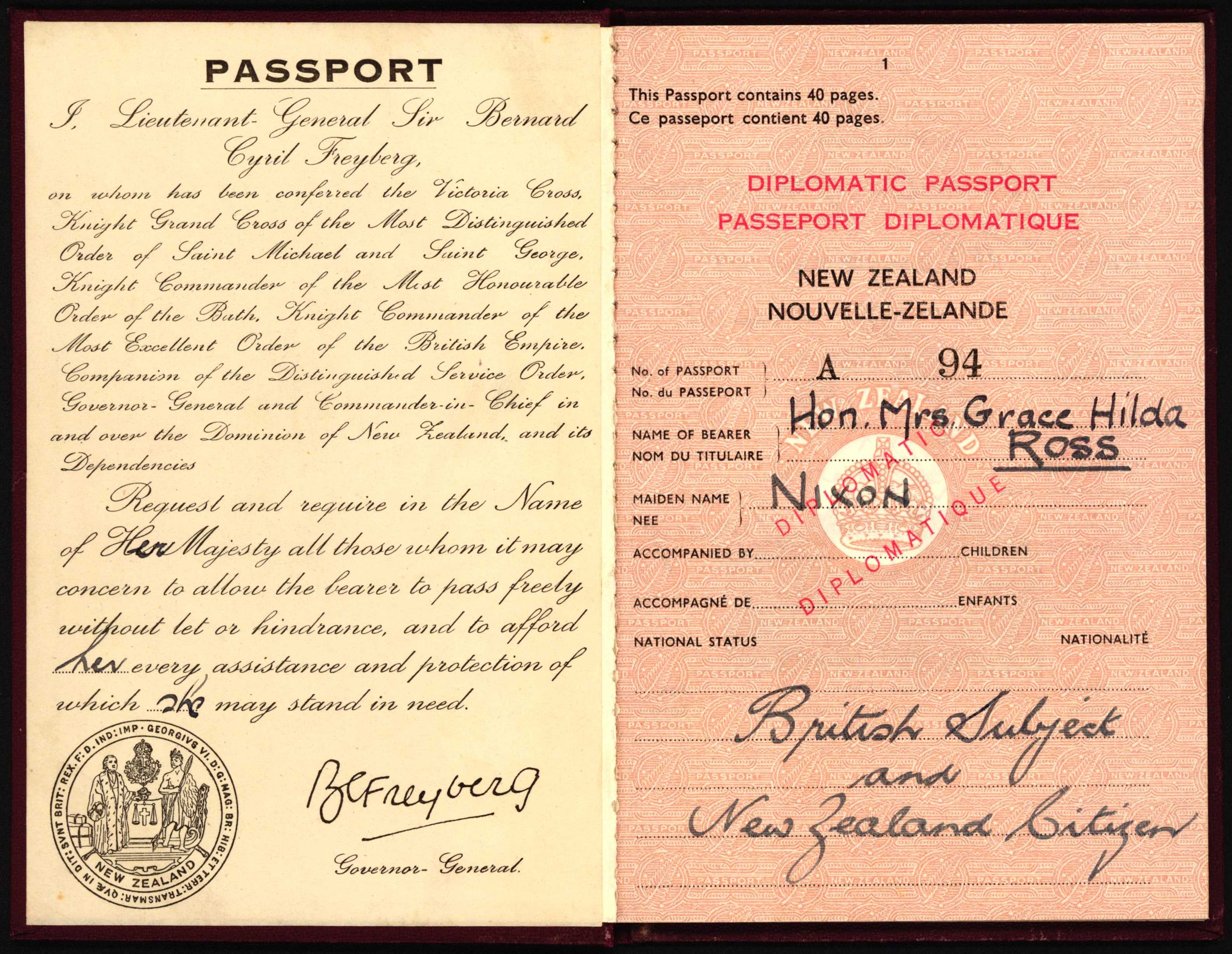
Dame Hilda Ross diplomatic passport (interior) (1952)

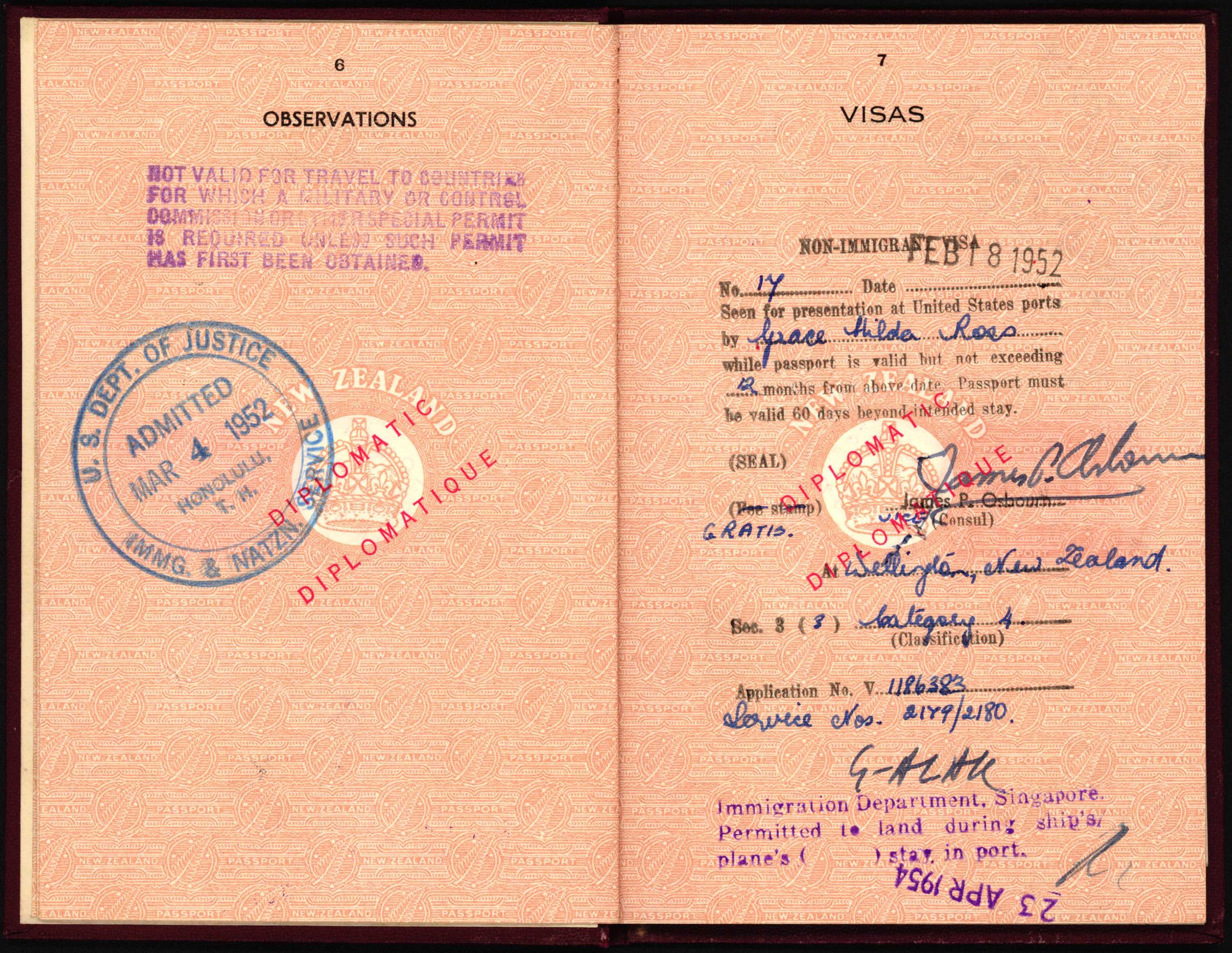
Dame Hilda Ross - Visas in passport (1952)

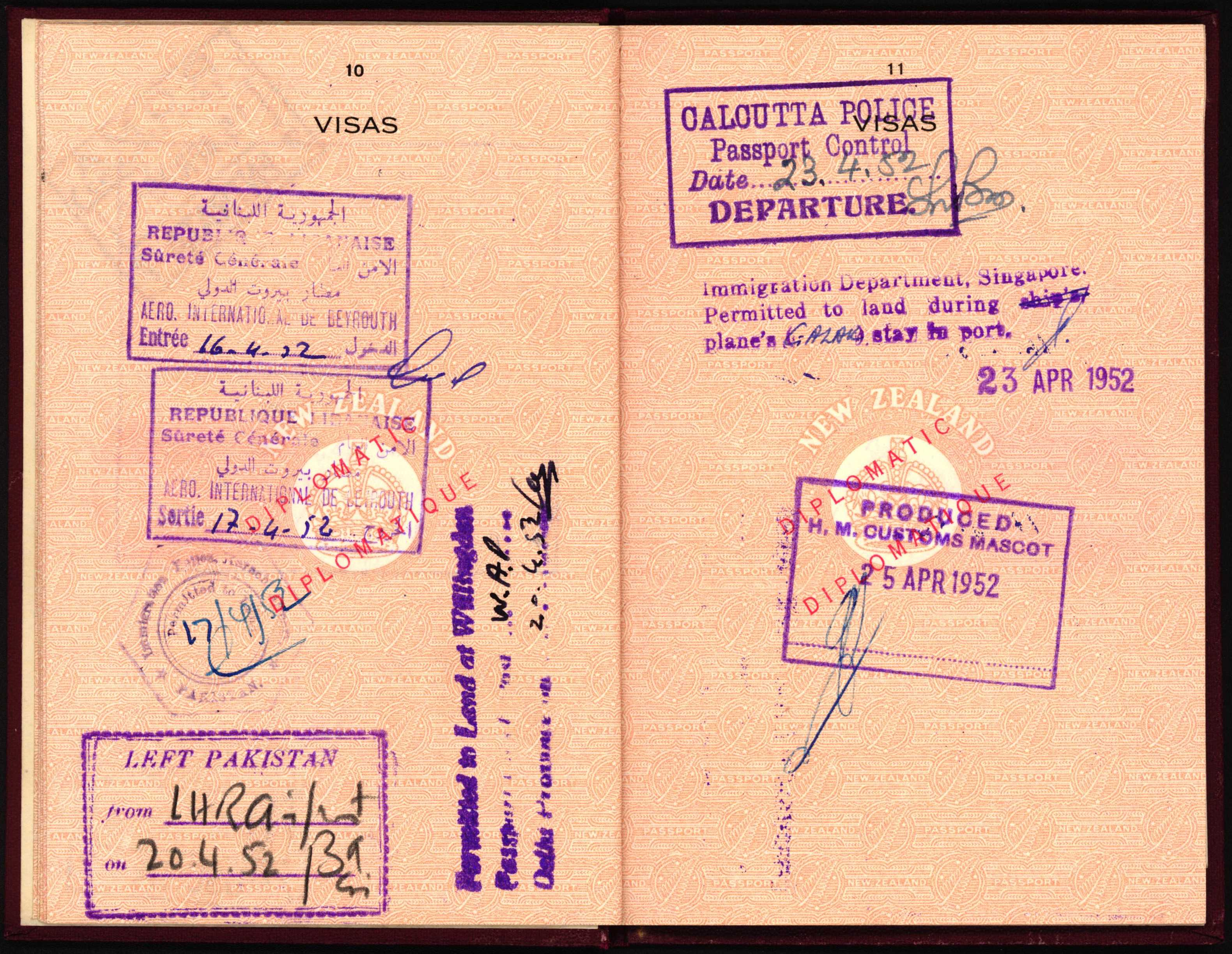
Dame Hilda Ross - visas in passport (1952)

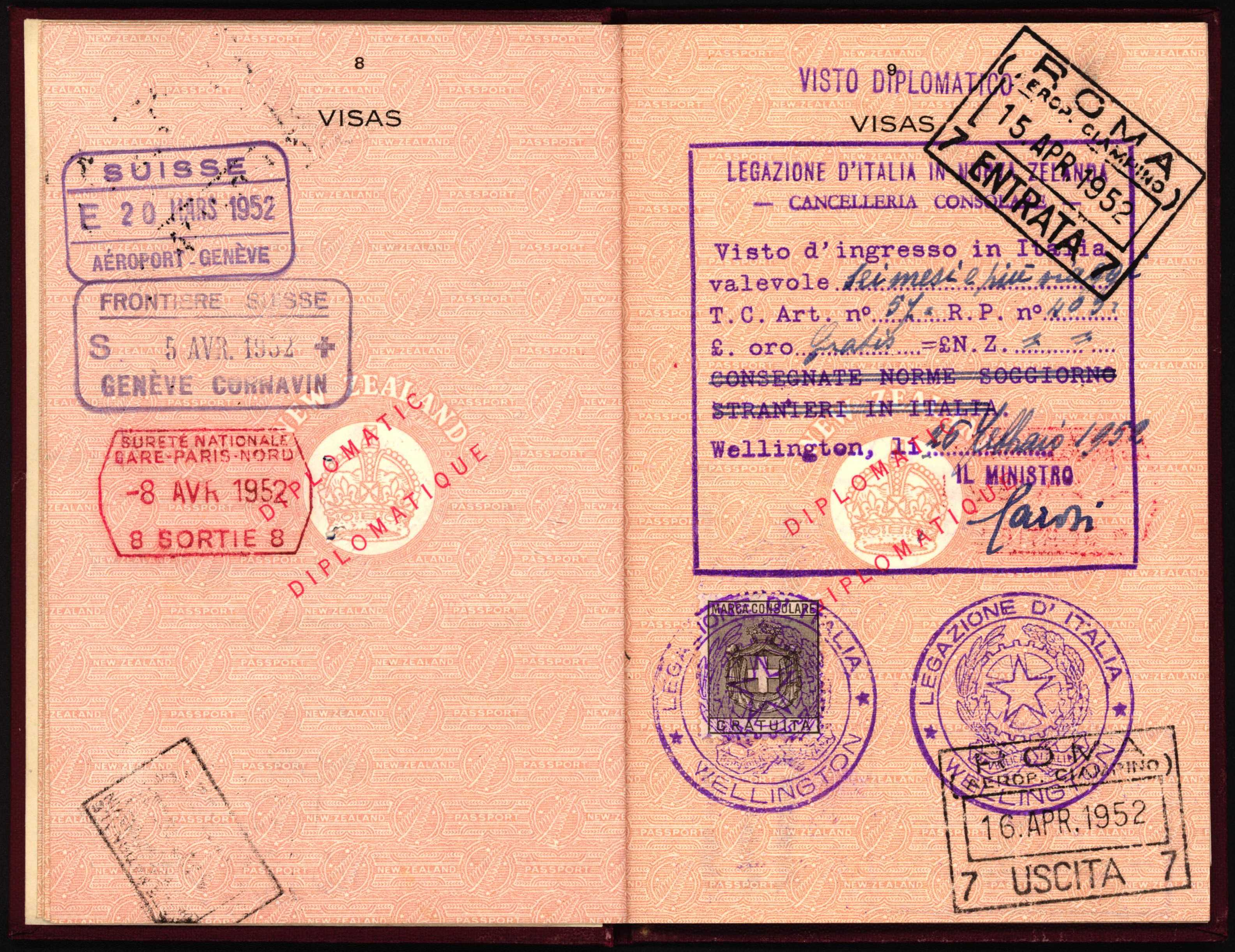
Dame Hilda Ross - Visas in Passport (1952)

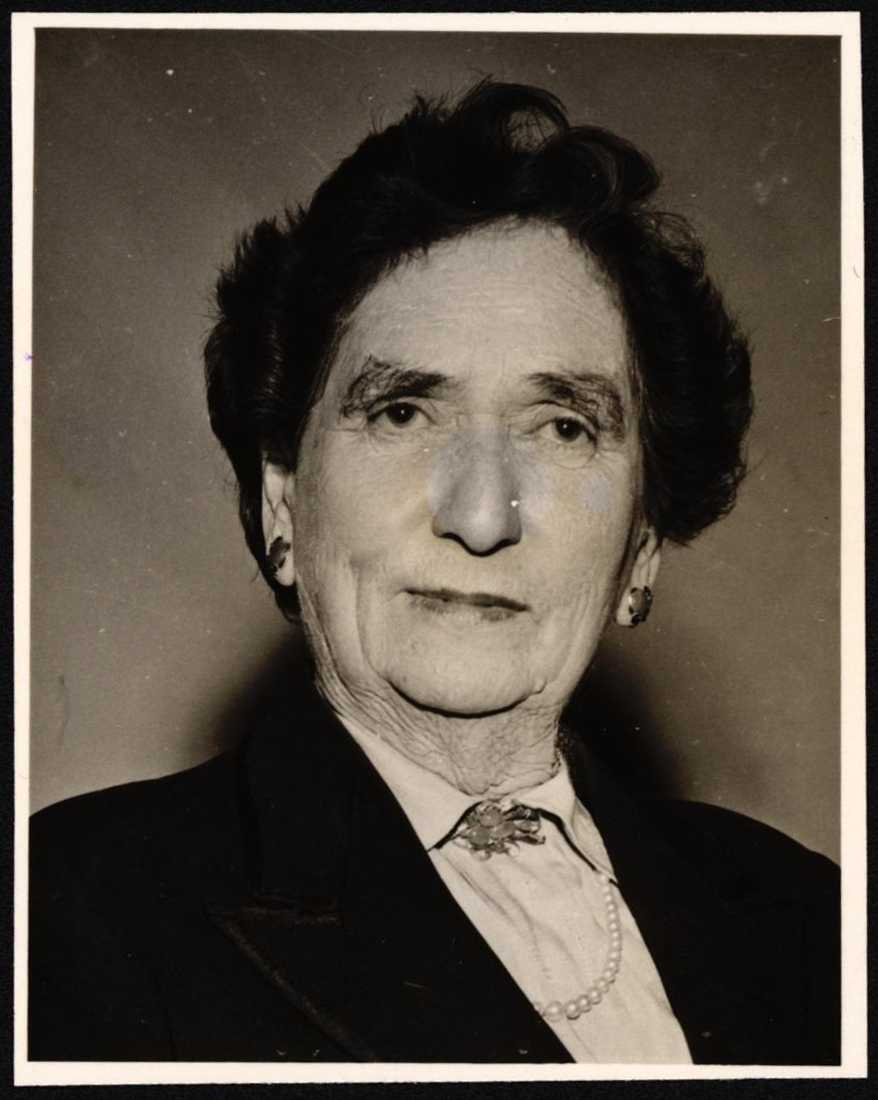
Dame Hilda Ross passport photo (1958)

== See also ==
- List of New Zealand politicians
- List of members of the New Zealand Parliament who died in office

== Notes ==
New Zealand Parliament
Preceded by Frank Findlay	Member of Parliament for Hamilton; 1945–1959	Succeeded by Lance Adams-Schneider
