= Real Democracy Movement (New Zealand) =

Political movement in New Zealand

The Real Democracy Movement of New Zealand was a short-lived political movement in New Zealand founded in 1942. The social credit movement decided to set up a "separate political organisation" the “Real Democracy Movement” at their annual conference in January 1942, but the RDM got only about 4,400 votes in the 1943 election.

The movement's aims, as stated at the first annual conference, held at Lower Hutt on 22 January 1943, was for “economic security combined with individual liberty”, and advocated that all returned servicemen should be paid at least the average wage until they were re-integrated into civil employment.

The movement stood 25 candidates in the 1943 election, and also supported two of the three Fighting Forces League (FFL) candidates. The movement received only 4,421 votes (0.53%, on provisional count of votes).

In a post-election letter, F. Allen (a North Island executive member) stated that the movement wanted fewer controls except that "the people should control money or credit policy, something vastly different from what obtains at present"; and objected to the movement being called a party.

Roly Marks, another North Island executive member, later stood several times for the Social Credit Party. Like nearly half the executive, he was a returned soldier from World War I.
