= Mary Isabella Lee =

New Zealand servant, dressmaker, and coalminer

- Born: 18 June 1871; Coatbridge, Lanarkshire, Scotland
- Died: 7 August 1939 (aged 68); Wellington, New Zealand
- Children: 4, including John A. Lee

Mary Isabella Lee (née Taylor; 18 June 1871 – 7 August 1939) was a New Zealand servant, dressmaker, coalminer and homemaker. She wrote an autobiography which was published 53 years after her death.

== Biography ==
She was born in Coatbridge, Lanarkshire, Scotland, on 18 June 1871 and emigrated to Dunedin, New Zealand with her parents Alison or Alice McDonald and Alexander Taylor in 1877. She suffered physical abuse from her alcoholic mother, which resulted in her deafness and intermittent loss of sight. She left home at 16, but had to return home after spending seven months in hospital while blind.

In 1889, she met and agreed to an informal marriage with Alfred Lee. During this marriage, she worked at a small coal mine her husband had leased, while caring for her infant daughter and pregnant with a son. Alfred was a drinker and gambler, and when he missed her and hit her daughter accidentally, she left him. She then supported herself by dressmaking, washing, sewing and cleaning. She received charitable aid between 1890 and at least 1911, and lived on and off with her parents. She had two more children, though one died in infancy. When they were old enough, her sons contributed to her finances. In her later life, she lived with her sons and their families. She died in Wellington, on 7 August 1939.

The second of her four children, John A. Lee, was a member of parliament for Labour in Auckland East from 1922 to 1928 and in Grey Lynn from 1931 to 1943, forming Democratic Labour in 1940.

Mary Lee wrote an autobiography, The Not So Poor, partly in response to John Lee's fictionalised autobiography, Children of the Poor (1934). Her autobiography was not published until 1992.

== Bibliography ==
- Lee, Mary Isabella (1992). Cooper, Annabel (ed.). The Not So Poor: An Autobiography. Auckland, N.Z: Auckland University Press. ISBN 1869400690.
