= 1963 Grey Lynn by-election =

New Zealand by-election

- 18 May 1963
- Turnout: 15,336 (41.48%)
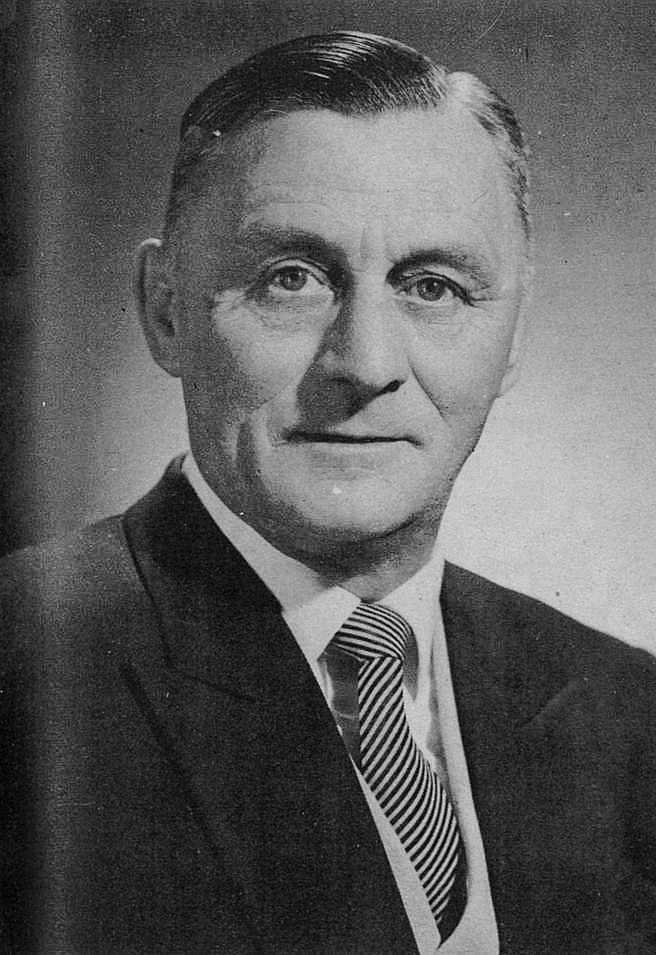

Candidate	Reginald Keeling	Ray Presland
Party	Labour	National
Popular vote	4,172	1,791
Percentage	65.84	28.26
Member before election
Fred Hackett
Labour
Elected Member
Reginald Keeling
Labour

The Grey Lynn by-election 1963 was a by-election held in the Grey Lynn electorate in Auckland during the term of the 33rd New Zealand Parliament, on 18 May 1963.

The by-election was caused by the death of incumbent MP Fred Hackett of the Labour Party on 19 March 1963. The by-election was won by Reginald Keeling, also of the Labour Party.

== Background ==
Fred Hackett had represented Grey Lynn since 1943 when he defeated John A. Lee. Hackett had been ill for some time and was admitted to Auckland Hospital on 25 July 1962 for an operation on his brain, which saved his life. Following the operation he gradually recovered and was discharged in early September. As a result of his health he intended to step down as Deputy Leader of the Opposition, however he did intend to stay in parliament and had already been re-selected to contest Grey Lynn at the upcoming 1963 election, but died on 19 March.

== Candidates ==
Communist Party
George Jackson contested the seat for the Communist Party of New Zealand (CPNZ). An orchardist by profession, he was Chairman of the CPNZ at the time. He had unsuccessfully stood in Ponsonby in both 1957 and 1960.

Labour Party
The Labour Party initially intended for its candidate selected for the by-election to also be for the candidate for Grey Lynn under the newly drawn boundaries which were to come into force for the general election at the end of the year. As a result, this would mean Ritchie Macdonald, the incumbent MP for the soon to be abolished Ponsonby seat, would be unable to contest the selection without resigning in Ponsonby and therefore triggering another by-election. Labour made a similar decision for the selection in the Otahuhu by-election several months earlier. Labour reversed this decision several weeks later as the result of a new ruling from the national executive of the party to hold separate selections for the by-election and general election.

Several names were put forward as candidates including:

- Alex Dreaver, a member of the Auckland City Council since 1953 – son of Mary Dreaver
- Martyn Finlay, a lawyer former MP for North Shore (1946–49) and President of the Labour Party since 1960
- Reginald Keeling, former MP for Gisborne (1949–51; 1954–60)
- Ritchie Macdonald, MP for Ponsonby since 1946
- Thomas Price, a Labour candidate for the Auckland City Council in 1962 and a 1963 by-election

The selection meeting was held on 25 April in the West Lynn Boys' Club Hall in front of a large gathering of branch members. The selection for the general election was held first followed by the "caretaker" selection. Labour selected Macdonald and Keeling as their candidates for the general election and by-election respectively. After missing out on the first selection, Finlay did not contest the by-election ballot. Keeling, who had only recently moved to Auckland, had previously been MP for Gisborne (1949–51; 1954–60). Only a week earlier he had been selected to stand in the North Shore electorate at the general election later in the year and was thus only a stand in until then. Macdonald, who had represented the neighbouring Ponsonby since 1949, won selection to contest Grey Lynn in the subsequent general election. Large portions of Ponsonby were transferred to Grey Lynn.

National Party
Raymond John Presland was chosen to contest the seat for the National Party. He had contested Auckland Central for National in 1960. Several months earlier he had unsuccessfully sought the National nomination at another by-election in Otahuhu. An importer by trade, he was the sole nominee for the party candidacy.

Social Credit
William Alexander "Bill" Ross stood for the Social Credit Party. He was a building contractor and previously an executive member of the Auckland Carpenters' Union. Previously he had contested the safe Labour seat of Ponsonby in the 1957 and 1960 elections.

== Campaign ==
The by-election was noted for its lack of interest from the public. The total of attendances to campaign meetings did not exceed 290 and most meetings were over in less than 90 minutes with only one or two questions from the floor. The overwhelming majority of attendees were either middle-aged or elderly. Only Keeling and Presland held meetings, the Communist and Social Credit parties did not even hold public gatherings. Four cabinet ministers travelled to the electorate to campaign for Presland. Labour MPs from four neighboring electorates as well as the Deputy Leader of the Opposition Hugh Watt campaigned on behalf of Keeling. The campaign finished on the evening of 17 May with speeches from the Prime Minister Keith Holyoake and Leader of the Opposition Arnold Nordmeyer.

== Results ==
The following table gives the election results:

1963 Grey Lynn by-election
Party	Candidate	Votes	%	±%
Labour	Reginald Keeling	4,172	65.84	
National	Ray Presland	1,791	28.26	
Social Credit	Bill Ross	246	3.88	
Communist	George Jackson	128	2.02	
Informal votes		24	0.38	
Majority		2,381	37.57	
Turnout		6,361	41.48	−44.66
Registered electors		15,336		
Labour hold		Swing		

== Aftermath ==
Keeling retained the seat for Labour in a low turnout poll. Keeling did not stand for Grey Lynn at the 1963 general election, standing instead in North Shore where he was defeated. Ritchie Macdonald instead transferred to Grey Lynn following the abolition of his seat of Ponsonby. Both Jackson and Ross contested Grey Lynn again in 1963.
