= 1940 New Zealand Labour Party leadership election =

New Zealand party leadership election

- 4 April 1940
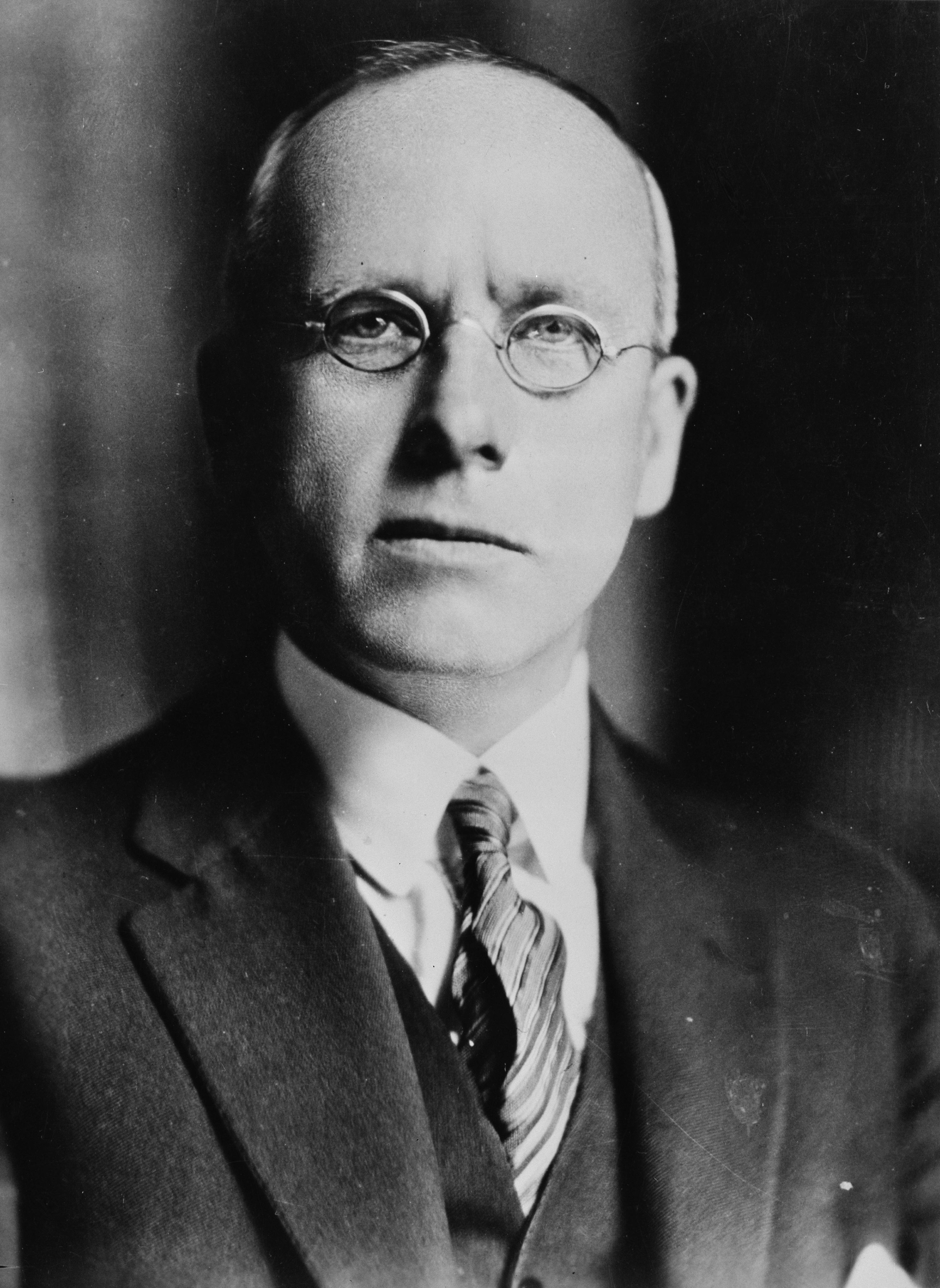

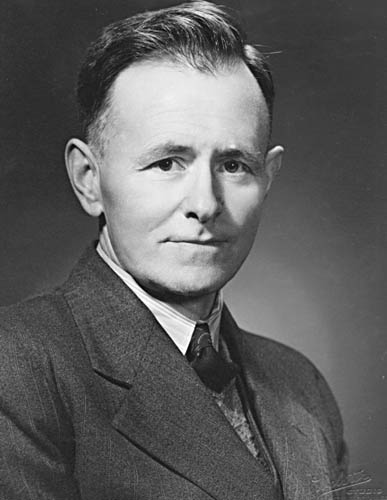

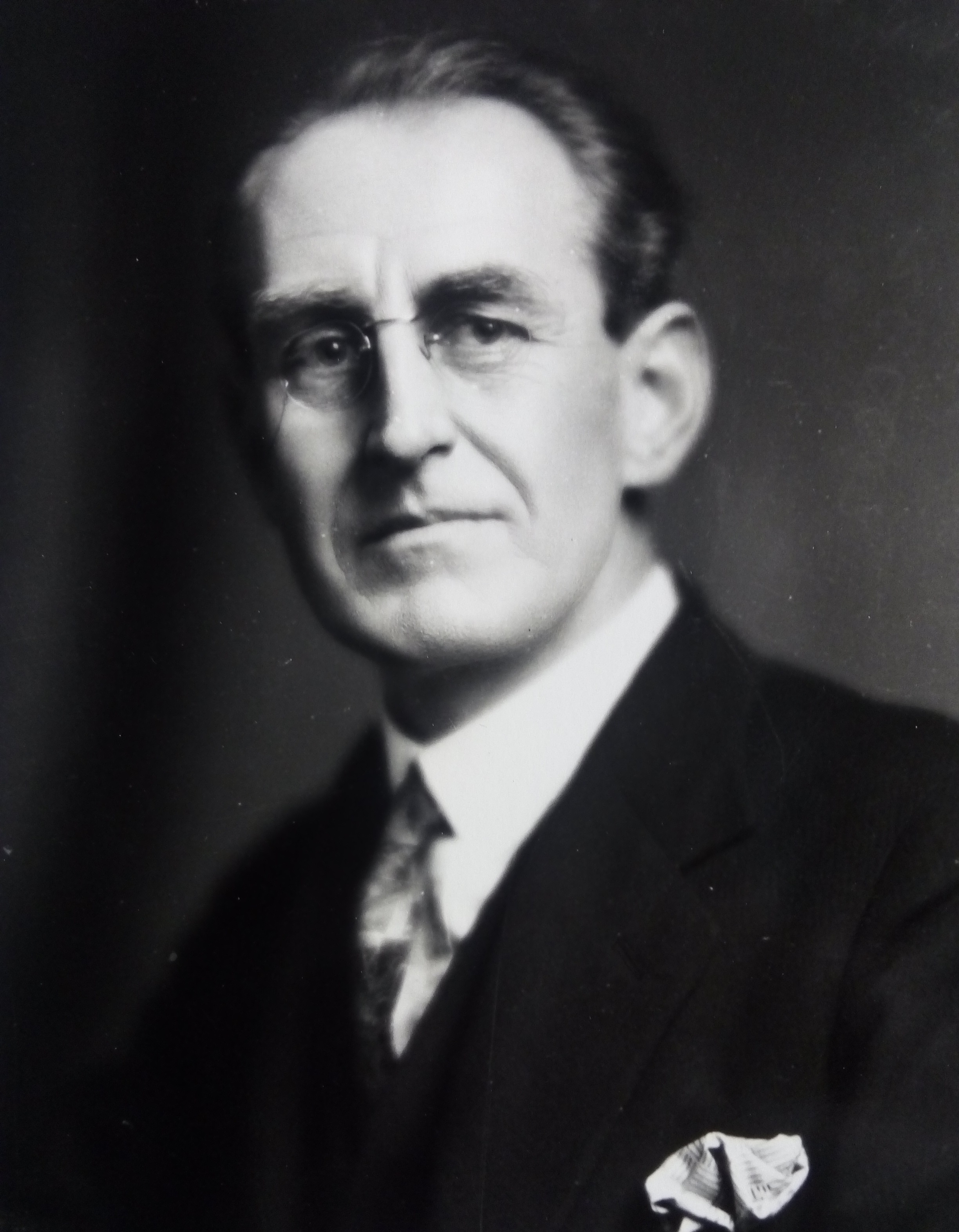
Candidate	Peter Fraser	Gervan McMillan	Clyde Carr
Popular vote	33	12	3
Percentage	68.7%	25.0%	6.2%
Leader before election
Michael Joseph Savage
Leader after election
Peter Fraser

The New Zealand Labour Party leadership election, 1940 was held on 4 April 1940 to choose the fourth leader of the New Zealand Labour Party. The election was won by Wellington Central MP Peter Fraser.

It followed the death of incumbent Labour leader and Prime Minister Michael Joseph Savage.

== Background ==
Despite governing with a healthy majority, Labour was facing antagonism from within its own ranks. The Labour Party had been overtly socialist at its inception, it had gradually drifted away from its earlier radicalism under Savage. Labour MP, John A. Lee, whose outlooks were a combination of socialism and social credit theory, arose as a vocal critic of the party's leadership, accusing it of acting dictatorially and of betraying the party's founding ideals.

After a long and bitter dispute, Lee was expelled from the party by Fraser, establishing the breakaway Democratic Labour Party. Only one other sitting Labour MP, Bill Barnard joined, though many others were sympathetic and gave serious consideration.

== Candidates ==
=== Peter Fraser ===
Fraser had been an MP since 1918. He had served as Michael Joseph Savage's deputy since 1933 and by Savage's death he was effectively holding the office of Prime Minister during the former's battle with colon cancer.

=== Gervan McMillan ===
Gervan McMillan was nominated for the leadership by his close colleague and friend from Otago, Arnold Nordmeyer. He was a staunch supporter of John A. Lee in an increasingly divided caucus. McMillan was of the opinion that Labour's leadership was too conservative and cautious, especially on financial issues. Like Lee, he sponsored a greater use of credit and to further encourage local industries.

=== Clyde Carr ===
Carr had previously served as Labour's party president (1936–1937). After Labour won office in 1935, Carr was not given any ministerial portfolios. As a result, he had become somewhat of a dissident in the Labour caucus. Carr, like McMillan, was also an open sympathiser of John A. Lee's

== Result ==
The election was conducted through a caucus vote by the then parliamentary MPs. Arnold Nordmeyer had proposed a private ballot, however the idea was rejected. Peter Fraser won, with a total of 33 votes, well over half the caucus, while McMillan gained 12 votes and Carr just 3.

Candidate	Votes	%
Peter Fraser	33	68.7
Gervan McMillan	12	25.0
Clyde Carr	3	6.2
Majority	21	34.4
Turnout	48	—N/a

== Aftermath ==
Peter Fraser would lead Labour until he, himself died in 1950. Upon his election, Fraser had to give the party's caucus the right to elect people to Cabinet without the leaders's approval, a practice which has continued as Labour Party policy to this day. Gervan McMillan would later resign from all his parliamentary responsibilities and did not seek re-election in 1943. Carr continued on as a Labour MP, declining to join Lee's splinter party, the Democratic Labour Party. He was later to serve as the Chairman of Committees (1947–1949) and Deputy Speaker (1946–1950) in Fraser's caucus. Bill Barnard joined (and then later resigned from) the Democratic Labour Party but remained as Speaker of the New Zealand House of Representatives until he was defeated in the 1943 general election (standing as an independent, not for the DLP).
