= Harry Dudfield =

New Zealand politician

Harry Dudfield (12 May 1912 – 19 July 1987) was a New Zealand politician of the National Party.

== Biography ==
New Zealand Parliament
Years	Term	Electorate	Party
1951–1954	30th	Gisborne	National

Dudfield was born in Gisborne in 1912. He worked for A. and T. Burt until World War II, when he became a soldier and served in the Middle East, Italy and the Pacific. After the war, he worked for the Department of Health, first in Auckland and then in Tokomaru Bay. As a New Zealand Army Captain with Kayforce, he led an advance party to the Korean War, but was withdrawn to contest the 1951 snap election for the Gisborne electorate.

He won the Gisborne electorate from Labour's Reginald Keeling in the 1951 election, but lost to Keeling in the next election in 1954. He told Parliament in 1952 that he doubted Communist claims that United Nations forces were using germ warfare in Korea. In 1953, Dudfield was awarded the Queen Elizabeth II Coronation Medal.

After his time in Parliament, he worked as a health inspector in Rotorua and then in Tawa. In 1955, he married Mona Lindsay at the Presbyterian Church in St Albans, Christchurch. At the 1980 local-body elections Dudfield stood for the newly created Wellington Regional Council in the Tawa ward. He was defeated by Mervyn Kemp, the sitting Mayor of Tawa, by a large margin. At the 1983 and 1986 elections he stood as a candidate for the Tawa Borough Council, but was unsuccessful on both occasions. On his first attempt he was the highest polling unsuccessful candidate. In his second attempt he polled less votes than any other candidate.

Dudfield died on 19 July 1987 in Tawa, and his wife died on 14 November 2010.
