= Auckland East =

Auckland East was a New Zealand electorate, situated in the east of Auckland. It existed between 1861 and 1887, and again between 1905 and 1946.

== History ==
The Auckland East electorate was established for the 1860–1861 election, when the City of Auckland electorate was split in half. It consisted of most of modern Auckland's central business district. Its boundaries remained largely static until 1875–1876 election, when the focus of the electorate shifted eastwards, making room for Auckland North electorate. It was abolished in the 1887 election, with most of its territory being absorbed by the neighbouring Parnell electorate.

At the 1905 election, a new electorate of the same name was created, again by abolishing a multi-member seat called City of Auckland. The boundaries of the new Auckland East were similar to those of the original, although its borders often shifted. By the 1938 election, it had lost most of the central business district, and was more focused on Parnell, Newmarket, and Grafton. It was abolished in the 1946 election, with most of its territory becoming part of a re-established Parnell electorate.

The first seat called Auckland East existed before political parties. The second seat was initially held by the Liberals, but later swung to the rising Labour Party, with the United Party (the Liberals' successor) capturing it only once after its initial loss. The seat also briefly belonged to the Reform Party, which captured it in a by-election but was unable to keep it.

John A. Lee failed to win the seat for Labour in the 1921 by-election, but won it in the 1922 election and the 1925 election. However he lost the seat in the 1928 election (by 37 votes), which he later blamed on boundary changes. In 1927 the Representation Commission proposed altering the boundaries of the Parnell electorate; which if confirmed would have made the electorate "dry" or no-licence, and without an authority which could issue temporary licences for the Ellerslie and Alexandra Park raceways. Following objections, the boundary between the Parnell and Auckland East electorates was adjusted to include a hotel in the Parnell electorate (so retaining the licensing committee).

Emily Maguire contested the 1928 election for the Reform Party, but was unsuccessful against James Donald of the United Party.

=== Election results ===
Key

Independent Liberal Independent Liberal Reform Labour United

Election	Winner
1861 election	Thomas Russell
1866 election	Archibald Clark
1871 election	Julius Vogel
1875 election	William Rees
1879 election	William Speight
1881 election	Sir George Grey
1884 election	Sir George Grey
(Electorate abolished 1887–1905)
1905 election	Frederick Baume
1908 election	Frederick Baume
1910 by-election	Arthur Myers
1911 election	Arthur Myers
1914 election	Arthur Myers
1919 election	Arthur Myers
1921 by-election	Clutha Mackenzie
1922 election	John A. Lee
1925 election	John A. Lee
1928 election	James Donald
1931 election	Bill Schramm
1935 election	Bill Schramm
1938 election	Bill Schramm
1943 election	Bill Schramm
(electorate abolished 1946; see Parnell)

== Election results ==
=== 1943 election ===
1943 general election: Auckland East
Party	Candidate	Votes	%	±%
Labour	Bill Schramm	7,167	47.08	−11.18
National	Harry Tom Merritt	6,205	40.76	−1.27
Democratic Labour	Leo Steve Dromgoole	1,366	8.97	
Independent	Ron Howell	127	0.83	
Real Democracy	Frederick Jordan	96	0.63	
People's Movement	Richard Culver	46	0.30	
Informal votes		199	1.30	+0.59
Majority		962	6.32	−10.89
Turnout		15,220	81.85	−6.38

=== 1938 election ===
1938 general election: Auckland East
Party	Candidate	Votes	%	±%
Labour	Bill Schramm	8,887	58.26	+6.28
National	Harry Tom Merritt	6,261	41.03	
Informal votes		109	0.71	
Majority		2,626	17.21	−2.57
Turnout		15,257	88.23	

=== 1935 election ===
1935 general election: Auckland East
Party	Candidate	Votes	%	±%
Labour	Bill Schramm	6,140	51.98	+10.32
Reform	Harold Percy Burton	3,803	32.20	+8.06
Democrat	James Donald	1,649	13.96	
Independent	Thomas Lamont	218	1.84	
Majority		2,337	19.78	
Turnout		11,810		

=== 1931 election ===
1931 general election: Auckland East
Party	Candidate	Votes	%	±%
Labour	Bill Schramm	3,893	41.66	
Reform	Harold Percy Burton	2,256	24.14	
United	William Henry Horton	1,754	18.77	
Women's Candidate	Ellen Melville	1,002	10.72	
Independent	John Alexander Arthur	439	4.70	
Majority		1,637	17.52	+17.17
Turnout		9,344	73.70	−5.74
Registered electors		12,678		

=== 1928 election ===
1928 general election: Auckland East
Party	Candidate	Votes	%	±%
United	James Donald	4,254	39.59	
Labour	John A. Lee	4,217	39.25	−5.70
Reform	Emily Maguire	2,274	21.16	
Majority		37	0.34	−2.55
Informal votes		220	2.01	+0.92
Turnout		10,965	79.45	−7.55
Registered electors		13,802		

=== 1925 election ===
1925 general election: Auckland East
Party	Candidate	Votes	%	±%
Labour	John A. Lee	4,477	44.95	−7.90
Reform	James Stewart	4,189	42.06	
Liberal	H. Oakley Browne	1,293	12.98	
Majority		288	2.89	−4.34
Informal votes		110	1.09	−0.42
Turnout		10,069	87.00	+0.35
Registered electors		11,573		

=== 1922 election ===
1922 general election: Auckland East
Party	Candidate	Votes	%	±%
Labour	John A. Lee	5,226	52.85	+20.04
Reform	Clutha Mackenzie	4,511	45.62	+6.86
Informal votes		150	1.51	
Majority		715	7.23	
Turnout		9,887	86.65	+27.57
Registered electors		11,409		

=== 1921 by-election ===
1921 Auckland East by-election
Party	Candidate	Votes	%	±%
Reform	Clutha Mackenzie	2,613	38.76	−0.01
Labour	John A. Lee	2,212	32.81	
Liberal	George Russell	1,053	15.62	
Independent	George H Foster	863	12.80	
Majority		401	5.94	
Turnout		6,741	59.08	−24.68

=== 1919 election ===
1919 general election: Auckland East
Party	Candidate	Votes	%	±%
Liberal	Arthur Myers	3,718	40.50	−26.05
Reform	Clutha Mackenzie	3,560	38.77	
Labour	Robert Frederick Way	1,756	19.12	
Informal votes		146	1.59	+0.01
Majority		158	1.72	−31.39
Turnout		9,180	83.76	+6.03
Registered electors		10,959		

=== 1914 election ===
1914 general election: Auckland East
Party	Candidate	Votes	%	±%
Liberal	Arthur Myers	5,039	66.55	+3.70
Reform	Arthur Holmes	2,532	33.44	
Informal votes		120	1.58	−0.66
Majority		2,507	33.11	+5.18
Turnout		7,571	77.73	−1.14
Registered electors		9,740		

=== 1911 election ===
1911 general election: Auckland East
Party	Candidate	Votes	%	±%
Liberal	Arthur Myers	4,485	62.85	+4.43
Independent Labour	Arthur Withy	2,490	34.89	
Informal votes		160	2.24	
Majority		1,993	27.93	−10.52
Turnout		7,135	78.87	+13.85
Registered electors		9,046		

=== 1910 by-election ===
1910 Auckland East by-election
Party	Candidate	Votes	%	±%
Independent Liberal	Arthur Myers	3,180	58.42	
Labour	George Davis	1,087	19.97	
Reform	William Richardson	754	13.85	−23.45
Independent	Reginald Walter Hill	309	5.67	
Labour	George Irving McKnight	75	1.37	
Majority		2,093	38.45	
Turnout		5,443	65.02	−8.67

=== 1908 election ===
1908 general election: Auckland East
Party	Candidate	Votes	%	±%
Liberal	Frederick Baume	3,358	55.37	+9.40
Conservative	William Richardson	2,262	37.30	+16.83
Ind. Labour League	John Nicholson Harle	374	6.16	
Informal votes		70	1.15	−0.35
Majority		1,096	18.07	+2.28
Turnout		6,064	73.69	−6.43
Registered electors		8,228		

=== 1905 election ===
1905 general election: Auckland East
Party	Candidate	Votes	%	±%
Liberal	Frederick Baume	2,535	45.97	
Conservative	Harry Bamford	1,664	30.17	
Conservative	William Richardson	1,129	20.47	
Socialist	Robert Frederick Way	103	1.86	
Informal votes		83	1.50	
Majority		871	15.79	
Turnout		5,514	80.12	
Registered electors		6,882		

=== 1881 election ===
1881 general election: Auckland East
Party	Candidate	Votes	%	±%
Independent	Sir George Grey	349	52.56	
Independent	James Clark	315	47.43	
Majority		34	5.12	
Turnout		664	71.78	
Registered electors		925		
