= 1910 Auckland East by-election =

New Zealand by-election

- 16 June 1910
- Turnout: 5,443
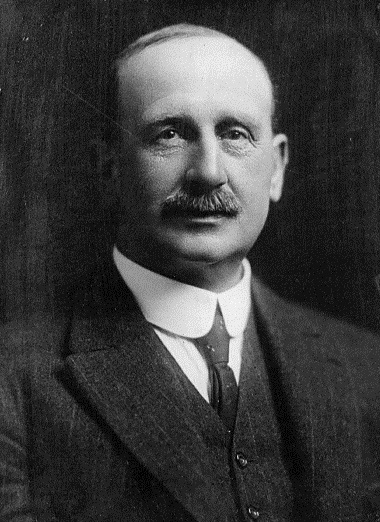

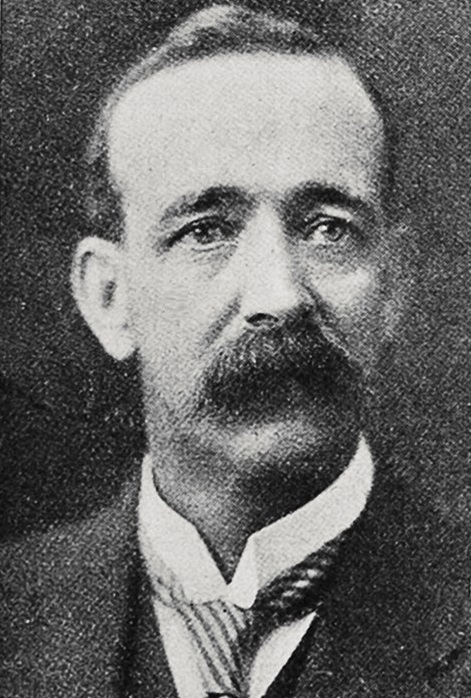

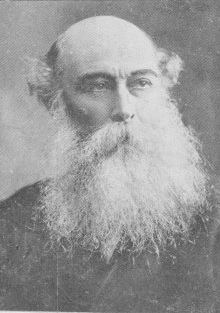
Candidate	Arthur Myers	George Davis	William Richardson
Party	Independent Liberal	Labour	Reform
Popular vote	3,180	1,087	754
Percentage	58.42	19.97	13.85
Member before election
Frederick Baume
Liberal
Elected Member
Arthur Myers
Independent Liberal

The Auckland East by-election was a by-election in the New Zealand electorate of Auckland East, an urban seat at the top of the North Island.

The by-election was held on 16 June 1910, and was precipitated by the death of sitting Liberal member of parliament Frederick Baume.

== Background ==
The election was won by Baume's cousin and former Mayor of Auckland, Arthur Myers who stood as an independent Liberal.

William Richardson, former secretary to opposition leader William Massey ran as a prohibitionist candidate. He opposed moves the Ward administration was making claiming it was working "hand in glove" with the liquor industry. Richardson had stood for the Auckland East seat in both the 1905 and 1908 elections placing third and second respectively.

Another opposition candidate was Reginald Walter Hill, who ran as an independent supporter of the Reform Party who only registered candidacy at the last minute.

Two Labour Party candidates ran against each other, with George Davis coming in second place. George Irving McKnight was originally chosen by the Labour Party, but proved unsatisfactory. His endorsement was revoked and the party chose to sponsor Davis instead. The prohibition league also endorsed Davis as Myers owned a brewery.

== Result ==
The following table gives the election results:

1910 Auckland East by-election
Party	Candidate	Votes	%	±%
Independent Liberal	Arthur Myers	3,180	58.42	
Labour	George Davis	1,087	19.97	
Reform	William Richardson	754	13.85	−23.45
Independent	Reginald Walter Hill	309	5.67	
Labour	George Irving McKnight	75	1.37	
Majority		2,093	38.45	
Turnout		5,443	65.02	−8.67
