= Fred Hackett =

New Zealand politician

The Honourable Fred Hackett
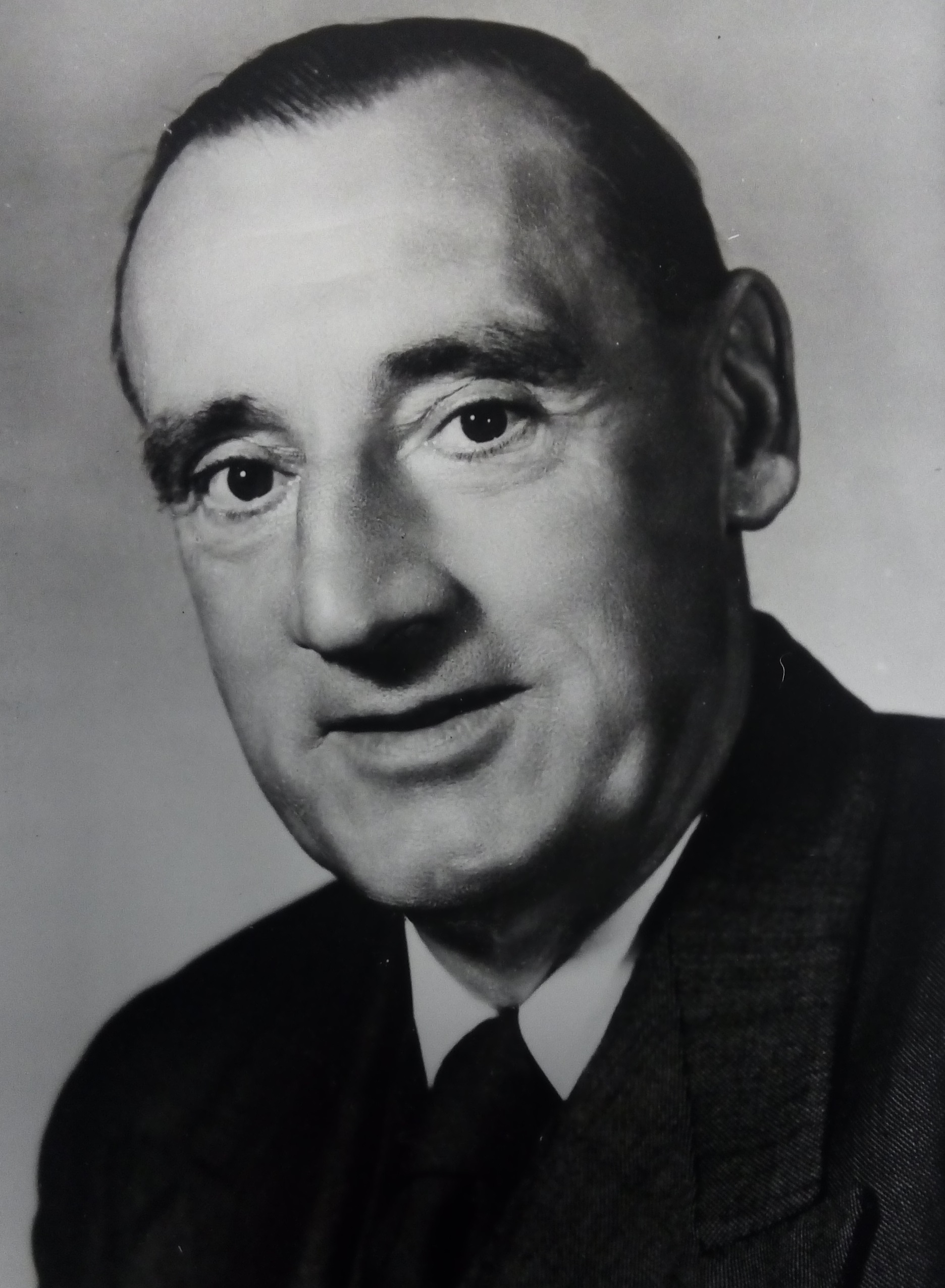

6th Deputy Leader of the Labour Party
- In office 7 June 1962 – 19 March 1963
- Leader: Walter Nash
- Preceded by: Jerry Skinner
- Succeeded by: Hugh Watt

20th Minister of Labour
- In office 12 December 1957 – 12 December 1960
- Prime Minister: Walter Nash
- Preceded by: John McAlpine
- Succeeded by: Tom Shand

33rd Minister of Immigration
- In office 12 December 1957 – 12 December 1960
- Prime Minister: Walter Nash
- Preceded by: Ralph Hanan
- Succeeded by: Tom Shand

6th Minister of Transport
- In office 18 October 1947 – 13 December 1949
- Prime Minister: Peter Fraser
- Preceded by: James O'Brien
- Succeeded by: Stan Goosman

33rd Postmaster-General
- In office 19 December 1946 – 13 December 1949
- Prime Minister: Peter Fraser
- Preceded by: Paddy Webb
- Succeeded by: Walter Broadfoot

Member of the New Zealand Parliament for Grey Lynn
- In office 25 September 1943 – 19 March 1963
- Preceded by: John A. Lee
- Succeeded by: Reginald Keeling

Personal details
- Born: 11 November 1901 Southampton, England
- Died: 19 March 1963 (aged 61) Auckland, New Zealand
- Party: Labour
- Spouse: Ivy Lily Bradford (m. 1923)
- Children: 4

Frederick Hackett (11 November 1901 – 19 March 1963) was a New Zealand politician of the Labour Party. He was a minister in both the First and Second Labour Governments of New Zealand and later the deputy leader of the opposition.

== Early life ==
Hackett was born in Southampton in 1901. He was educated locally and played association football in his youth. He found employment in the British Merchant Navy transporting refugees. He became a gunner in the Royal Navy during World War I. In 1921 he moved to New Zealand and he married Ivy Lily Bradford in Dunedin in 1923; together they had four children (three sons and one daughter). He became an active unionist and in 1922 Hackett gained employment at the Auckland Tramways Board. He was a prominent member of the Auckland Tramways Union for the next twenty years.

== Political career ==
=== Member of Parliament ===
New Zealand Parliament
Years	Term	Electorate	Party
1943–1946	27th	Grey Lynn	Labour
1946–1949	28th	Grey Lynn	Labour
1949–1951	29th	Grey Lynn	Labour
1951–1954	30th	Grey Lynn	Labour
1954–1957	31st	Grey Lynn	Labour
1957–1960	32nd	Grey Lynn	Labour
1960–1963	33rd	Grey Lynn	Labour

Hackett was the Member of Parliament for Grey Lynn from 1943 to 1963, when he died. He defeated John A. Lee in the electorate after Lee was expelled from the Labour Party following the "Lee Affair". After the end of World War II he was chairman of the Auckland rehabilitation committee which aided in the provision of employment placings, housing and furniture loans, educational assistance and trade-training subsidies to ex-service personnel, as well as services to widows of service personnel.

Contemporary politician Martyn Finlay said Hackett was an extremely effective representative for his electorate due to his ability to use the life experiences he acquired to relate personally with constituents; "Hackett learnt his trade in the best university of all - that of practical experience on the job."

Hackett was described by contemporaries as a party hack, though he was well-liked by caucus members and the wider Labour Party.

In 1953, Hackett was awarded the Queen Elizabeth II Coronation Medal.

=== Cabinet Minister ===
He was a cabinet minister in the Fraser Ministry of the First Labour Government: Postmaster-General and Minister of Telegraphs (1946–1949), Minister of Transport (1947–1949), Minister of Marine (1947–1949), Minister in charge of the Public Trust Office (1946–1947), State Fire Insurance (1946–1947), and Government Life Insurance Department (1946–1947). In 1948, as Minister of Transport, he increased the speed limit on the open road in New Zealand from 40 to 50 miles per hour (which it had been prior to the passing of emergency wartime regulations).

Hackett was opposed to New Zealand joining the International Monetary Fund, arguing that the state should have sole right to govern the country's finances.

Towards the end of the First Labour Government Hackett made a speech in New Plymouth where he stated that "The first duty of any government is to stay in office." It was said in rebuke to sentiments that when people were suffering in economic hardship they turned to Labour, but after prosperity had been restored Labour was deemed expendable. The remark was seen as 'cynical but true'.

In the Second Labour Government, he was Minister of Labour, Minister of Mines, and Minister of Immigration from 1957 to 1960. Prior to the announcement of the ministry Bill Fox, former vice-president of the Federation of Labour, was widely tipped to become Minister of Labour, but incoming Prime Minister Walter Nash confounded expectations by appointing Hackett (a former unionist) to the portfolio instead. As Minister of Labour he represented New Zealand at the 1959 International Labour Organisation conference in Geneva. There, he was unanimously elected as chairman of the government group at the conference. His largest challenge as Minister of Immigration was the decline of immigrants to New Zealand following the economic upturn in Europe during the late 1950s. As Minister for Mines he approved for Shell, BP and Todd Oil Services to explore for oil offshore in the Kapuni oil field in 1959, this decision later led to the beginning of a large industry in the Taranaki region.

=== Deputy Leader of the Opposition ===
Following Labour's defeat in 1960, Hackett served on the opposition frontbench and in June 1962 Hackett was elected as the deputy leader of the Labour Party, in preference to Arnold Nordmeyer and Hugh Watt, upon the unexpected death of Jerry Skinner. He beat Nordmeyer on the second ballot after Watt (a fellow Aucklander) had been eliminated in the first ballot for the position, as a compromise candidate as was regarded by many within the Party as a middle roader. Hackett also likely received sympathy votes as he was known to have been ill.

On 25 July 1962 he was admitted to Auckland Hospital for an operation on his brain, which saved his life. Following the operation he recovered steadily and was discharged in early September. During his absence Nordmeyer acted as deputy leader until Hackett returned to Parliament on 27 November 1962.

Following Skinner's death Walter Nash favoured Hackett to replace him when he retired prior the 1963 election, but with the death of Hackett, Nash was eventually left to be replaced by Arnold Nordmeyer. Before he died, Hackett informed the caucus that he would also resign the deputy-leadership when Nash retired. He was replaced by Hugh Watt. He did, however, intend to stay in parliament and had already been re-selected to contest Grey Lynn at the upcoming 1963 general election.

== Death ==
On 19 March 1963 Hackett collapsed and died at his New Lynn home. He was buried at Purewa Cemetery. He was survived by his wife, three sons and daughter.

== Notes ==
New Zealand Parliament
Preceded by John A. Lee	Member of Parliament for Grey Lynn; 1943–1963	Succeeded by Reginald Keeling
Political offices
Preceded by Paddy Webb	Postmaster-General and Minister of Telegraphs; 1946–1949	Succeeded by Walter Broadfoot
Preceded by James O'Brien	Minister of Transport; 1947–1949	Succeeded by Stan Goosman
Preceded by James O'Brien	Minister of Marine; 1947–1949	Succeeded by Stan Goosman
Preceded by Ralph Hanan	Minister of Immigration; 1957–1960	Succeeded by Tom Shand
Preceded by John McAlpine	Minister of Mines; 1957–1960	Succeeded by Tom Shand
Preceded by John McAlpine	Minister of Labour; 1957–1960	Succeeded by Tom Shand
Party political offices
Preceded by Jerry Skinner	Deputy Leader of the Labour Party; 1962–1963	Succeeded by Hugh Watt
