= George Davis (New Zealand politician) =

New Zealand politician and trade unionist

George Davis JP
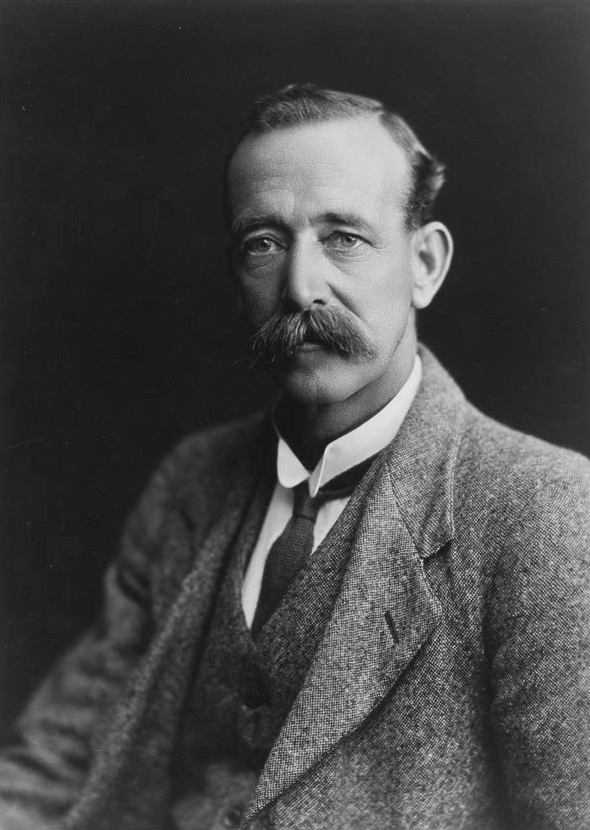

Auckland City Councillor
- In office 1919–1923
- In office 1927–1929

Personal details
- Born: 1876 England
- Died: 20 September 1937 (aged 60–61) New Zealand
- Party: IPLL (1904-1910); Labour (1910-12); United Labour (1912-16); Labour (1916-37)
- Profession: Trade unionist

George Davis JP (1876 – 20 September 1937) was a New Zealand politician and trade unionist.

== Biography ==
=== Early life ===
Born in England in 1876, Davis sailed to New Zealand as a child settling in Auckland and eventually became a trade unionist. He became the Secretary of the Auckland Drivers' Union in 1899, a position he held until retiring just prior to his death due to ill health. At 38 years of service he was the longest serving union secretary in Auckland. In 1909 he was made a Justice of the Peace.

=== Political career ===
Davis contested the 1910 Auckland East by-election as the official candidate of the Labour Party where he came in second place. George Irving McKnight had originally been chosen by the Labour Party, however he proved unsatisfactory. His endorsement was rescinded and Labour chose to sponsor Davis instead. The local prohibition league also endorsed Davis as the Liberal candidate (and eventual winner) Arthur Myers owned a brewery.

He stood for the Roskill electorate in the New Zealand House of Representatives in 1919 for the Labour Party where he placed third out of four candidates.

Davis was a member of the Auckland City Council serving from 1919 to 1923 and again between 1927 and 1929. Davis was also Chairman of the Auckland Labour Representation Committee.

=== Death ===
Davis died in 1937. He was survived by his wife and adult children.
