= Mayoral elections in Tawa =

Elections were held at regular times in Tawa, New Zealand, from its proclamation as a borough in 1953 to its abolition in 1989. Elections for the office of mayor were held every three years. The polling was conducted using the standard first-past-the-post electoral method. Only three elections were contested in a public vote.

== Election results ==
=== 1953 election ===
George Turkington was elected mayor unopposed.

=== 1954 by-election ===
Jock Davidson was elected mayor unopposed.

=== 1955 election ===
Mayor Jock Davidson resigned in December 1955. A by-election was avoided when the council decided to elect one of its own members to serve the remainder of the term. Councillor Mervyn Kemp was elected unanimously at a council meeting on 14 December 1955.

=== 1956 election ===
Mervyn Kemp was re-elected mayor unopposed.

=== 1959 election ===
1959 Tawa mayoral election
Party	Candidate	Votes	%	±%
Independent	Mervyn Kemp	1,221	61.63	
Ind. Progressive	Arthur Cornish	758	38.26	
Informal votes		2	0.10	
Majority		463	23.37	
Turnout		1,981		

=== 1962 election ===
Mervyn Kemp was re-elected mayor unopposed.

=== 1965 election ===
Mervyn Kemp was re-elected mayor unopposed.

=== 1968 election ===
Mervyn Kemp was re-elected mayor unopposed.

=== 1971 election ===
1971 Tawa mayoral election
Party	Candidate	Votes	%	±%
Independent	Mervyn Kemp	2,412	65.82	
Independent	Alfred Howard	1,252	34.17	
Majority		1,160	31.65	
Turnout		3,664	73.00	

=== 1974 election ===
Mervyn Kemp was re-elected mayor unopposed.

=== 1977 election ===
Mervyn Kemp was re-elected mayor unopposed.

=== 1980 election ===
Mervyn Kemp was re-elected mayor unopposed.

=== 1983 election ===
Roy Mitchell was elected mayor unopposed.

=== 1986 election ===
Doris Mills was elected mayor unopposed.

=== 1987 by-election ===
1987 Tawa mayoral by-election
Party	Candidate	Votes	%	±%
Independent	David Watt	3,445	74.45	
Independent	Roger Bradshaw	1,182	25.54	
Majority		2,263	48.90	
Turnout		4,627	57.00	
