= John Fletcher (New Zealand politician) =

New Zealand politician

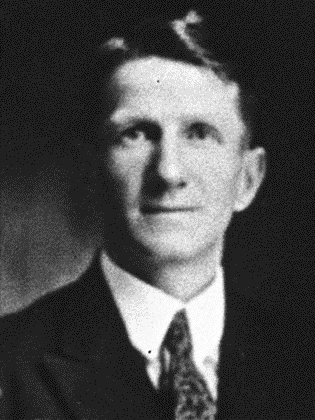

Member of the New Zealand Parliament for Grey Lynn
- In office 14 November 1928 – 12 November 1931
- Preceded by: Fred Bartram
- Succeeded by: John A. Lee

Personal details
- Born: 22 December 1888 Kirkintilloch, Scotland
- Died: 15 February 1934 (aged 45) Auckland, New Zealand
- Resting place: Hillsborough Cemetery, Auckland
- Relations: James Fletcher (brother); James Muir Cameron Fletcher (nephew)

John Shearer Fletcher (22 December 1888 – 15 February 1934) was a New Zealand member of the House of Representatives for Grey Lynn in Auckland. Born in Scotland, he came to New Zealand in 1916 to join his brothers in their construction business, out of which grew Fletcher Construction.

== Early life ==
Fletcher was born at Kirkintilloch, Scotland, the son of a builder, John Shearer Fletcher, and his wife, Janet Montgomery. He received his entire education through scholarships. He was one of thirteen children.

By age 24, Fletcher was headmaster under the Kirkintilloch school board for technical and commercial classes. He then moved to Glasgow and became secretary for the Scottish Class Teachers' Association, and was on the executive of the Scottish Education Institute. He was vice-president of the Young Men's Christian Association (YMCA). He undertook studies in construction in the United States and in Canada.

== Professional career in New Zealand ==
In 1916, Fletcher migrated to Dunedin, New Zealand, to join his brothers in their construction business. The company had been founded in 1909 after his brother James had come to Dunedin in the previous year. His brother James started to concentrate on business in Auckland and Wellington, and John Shearer Fletcher took over the Dunedin branch. Fletcher was an executive member of the Dunedin Manufacturers' Association. Of poor health, he retired from business during the 1920s and moved to Auckland.

== Member of Parliament ==
New Zealand Parliament
Years	Term	Electorate	Party
1928–1930	23rd	Grey Lynn	United
1930–1931	Changed allegiance to:		Independent

Fletcher represented the Grey Lynn electorate in the House of Representatives from 1928 to 1931. In the 1928 election, Fletcher defeated Fred Bartram for Grey Lynn. After having threatened his government in September 1929 to cross the house over unemployment and economic issues, Fletcher became an independent during 1930. In the 1931 election, he was defeated by John A. Lee of the Labour Party.

== Private life and death ==
Fletcher married Alice Emily Murphy in 1919. In Auckland, Fletcher participated in public life, and he was active with the YMCA, other social movements, and belonged to the Rotary Club. He was interested in politics and economics, and involved in association football, cricket, and lawn bowls. He died on 15 February 1934 and is buried at Hillsborough Cemetery in Auckland. His wife died on 28 June 1976.

== Notes ==
New Zealand Parliament
Preceded by Fred Bartram	Member of Parliament for Grey Lynn; 1928–1931	Succeeded by John A. Lee
