= 1921 Auckland East by-election =

New Zealand by-election

- 2 December 1921
- Turnout: 6,621
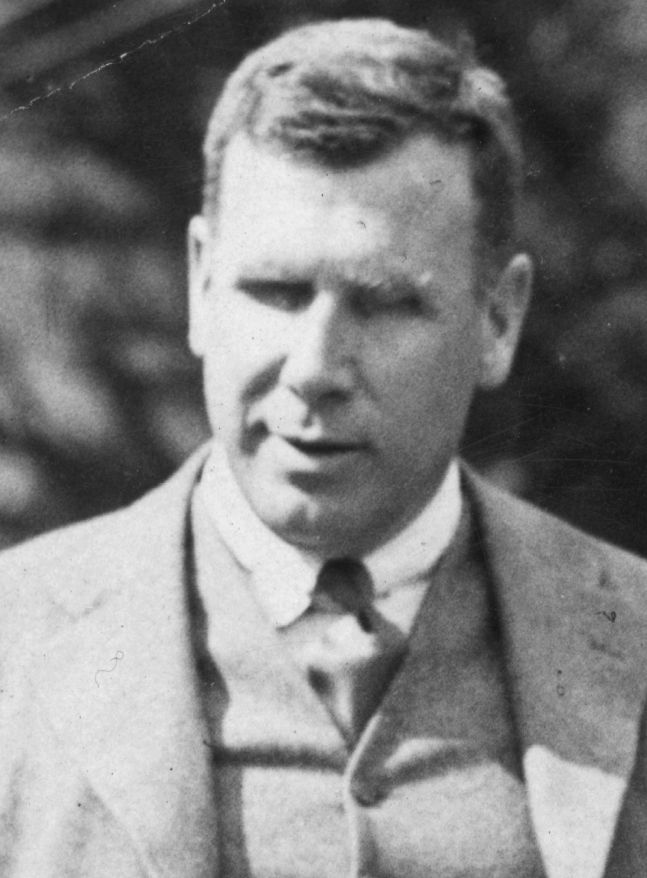

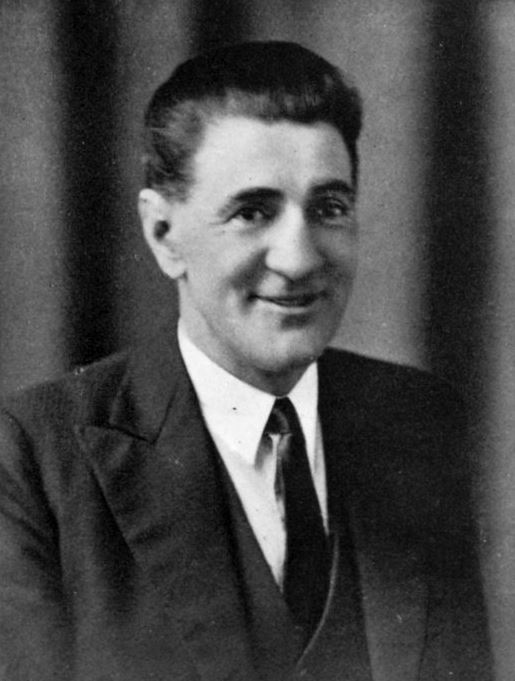

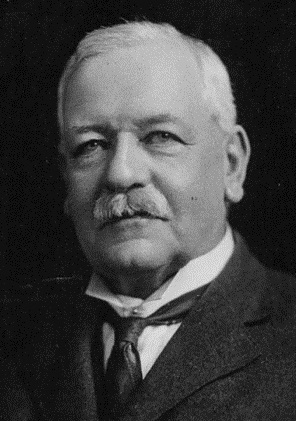
Candidate	Clutha Mackenzie	John A. Lee	George Warren Russell
Party	Reform	Labour	Liberal
Popular vote	2,613	2,212	1,053
Percentage	38.76	32.81	15.62
Member before election
Arthur Myers
Liberal
Elected Member
Clutha Mackenzie
Reform

The 1921 Auckland East by-election was a by-election in the New Zealand electorate of Auckland East, an urban seat at the top of the North Island.

The by-election was held on 2 December 1921, and was precipitated by the resignation of sitting Liberal member of parliament and former Mayor of Auckland, Arthur Myers.

== Background ==
The Labour Party selected John A. Lee, the President of the Auckland Labour Representation Committee, as their candidate. Unsuccessful nominees for the Labour candidacy were Rex Mason, James Purtell and Robert Frederick Way.

== Result ==
The following table gives the election results:

1921 Auckland East by-election
Party	Candidate	Votes	%	±%
Reform	Clutha Mackenzie	2,613	38.76	−0.01
Labour	John A. Lee	2,212	32.81	
Liberal	George Russell	1,053	15.62	
Independent	George H Foster	863	12.80	
Majority		401	5.94	
Turnout		6,741	59.08	−24.68

== Aftermath ==
Lee defeated Mackenzie in the 1922 election; both had war disabilities.
