= Reginald Keeling =

New Zealand politician

Reginald Keeling QSO JP
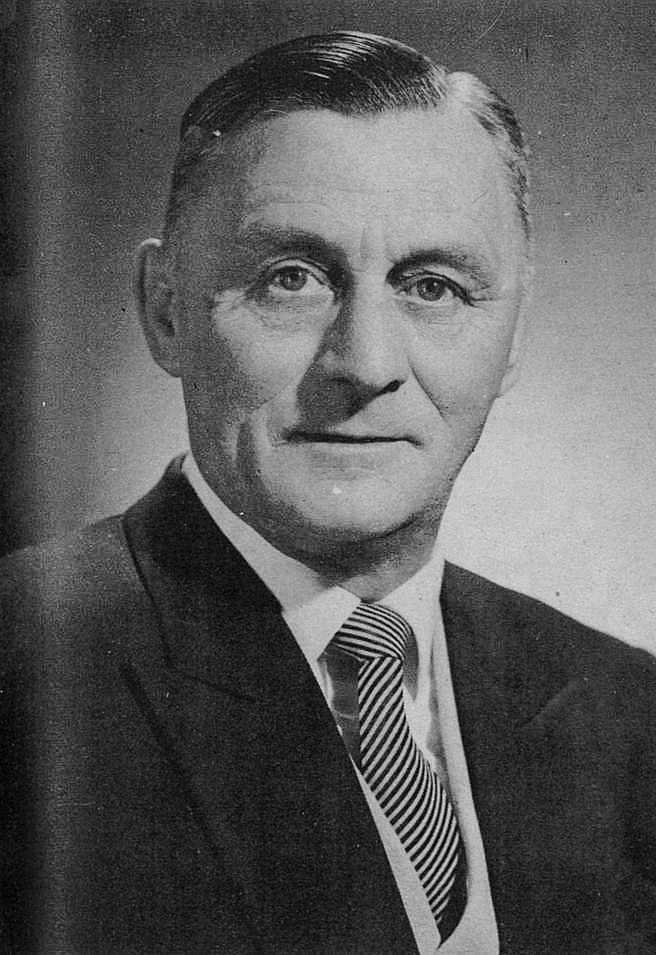

Member of the New Zealand Parliament for Gisborne
- In office 13 November 1954 – 26 November 1960
- Preceded by: Harry Dudfield
- Succeeded by: Esme Tombleson
- In office 30 November 1949 – 1 September 1951
- Preceded by: David Coleman
- Succeeded by: Harry Dudfield

Personal details
- Born: 15 January 1904 Fulham, London, England
- Died: 7 August 1991 (aged 87) Auckland, New Zealand
- Party: Labour
- Spouse: Christina Mather Murray (m. 1939)

Reginald Alfred Keeling QSO JP (15 January 1904 – 7 August 1991) was a New Zealand politician of the Labour Party.

== Biography ==
=== Early life and career ===
Keeling was born in 1904 in Fulham to Alfred J. Keeling. He was educated at Fulham Central School. Upon leaving school he joined Maypole Margarine Works as a cadet in the accounting department. After obtaining his articles he emigrated to New Zealand in 1928 to join Waitemata Electric Power Board as accountant. In 1932 he was appointed manager of Morris Hedstrom Tonga. He was a social activist and an active member of the Labor Party in both England and New Zealand upon returning to New Zealand in 1936, he moved from accounting to social work with the newly formed Child Welfare Division of the Education Department.

He was promoted to District Child Welfare Officer for the East Coast based in Gisborne. He remained in that post until entering Parliament in 1949. An avid sportsman, he was a football referee for twenty years, played senior club tennis well into his thirties and was a keen keel boat sailor. He was President of Poverty Bay Football Association 1940-61, President NZFA 1960-61, President of Auckland Football Association 1961-87.

=== Local politics ===
From that point he made a career well into his eighties out of both national and local body politics. He was Deputy Mayor of Gisborne 1953-59, Member of Cook Hospital Board 1953-61, Member Waitemata Electric Power Board 1965-87, Mayor of Henderson 1965-74, Member Auckland Regional Authority 1965-81, Deputy Mayor of Waitemata City 1977-80. In the 1980 New Year Honours, Keeling was appointed a Companion of the Queen's Service Order for public services.

=== Member of Parliament ===
New Zealand Parliament
Years	Term	Electorate	Party
1949–1951	29th	Gisborne	Labour
1954–1957	31st	Gisborne	Labour
1957–1960	32nd	Gisborne	Labour
1963	33rd	Grey Lynn	Labour

He represented the Poverty Bay electorate of Gisborne from 1949 to 1951, when he was defeated by Harry Dudfield of National, and again from 1954 to 1960, when he was again defeated, this time by the National candidate Esme Tombleson.

Keeling was Chairman of Committees during the Second Labour Government (1957–60). The Labour government held a working majority of one meaning the management of business in the house became vital to avoid the government losing an important vote. Keeling was praised for his skills in conducting committee business, especially for his quick rulings which were both firm and stuck, setting good precedence.

He then represented the Auckland electorate of Grey Lynn briefly in 1963 from 18 May to 29 October, after the death of Fred Hackett. He stood for North Shore in the 1963 general election but was defeated.

=== Death ===
Keeling died on 7 August 1991, aged 87.

== Notes ==
New Zealand Parliament
Preceded by David Coleman	Member of Parliament for Gisborne; 1949–1951 1954–1960	Succeeded by Harry Dudfield
Preceded by Harry Dudfield	Member of Parliament for Gisborne; 1949–1951 1954–1960	Succeeded by Esme Tombleson
Preceded by Fred Hackett	Member of Parliament for Grey Lynn; 1963	Succeeded by Ritchie Macdonald
Political offices
Preceded by Cyril Harker	Chairman of Committees of the House of Representatives; 1957–1960	Succeeded by Roy Jack
Preceded by Frederick George William Wilsher	Mayor of Henderson; 1965–1974	Succeeded by Assid Corban
