= Clutha Mackenzie =

New Zealand politician

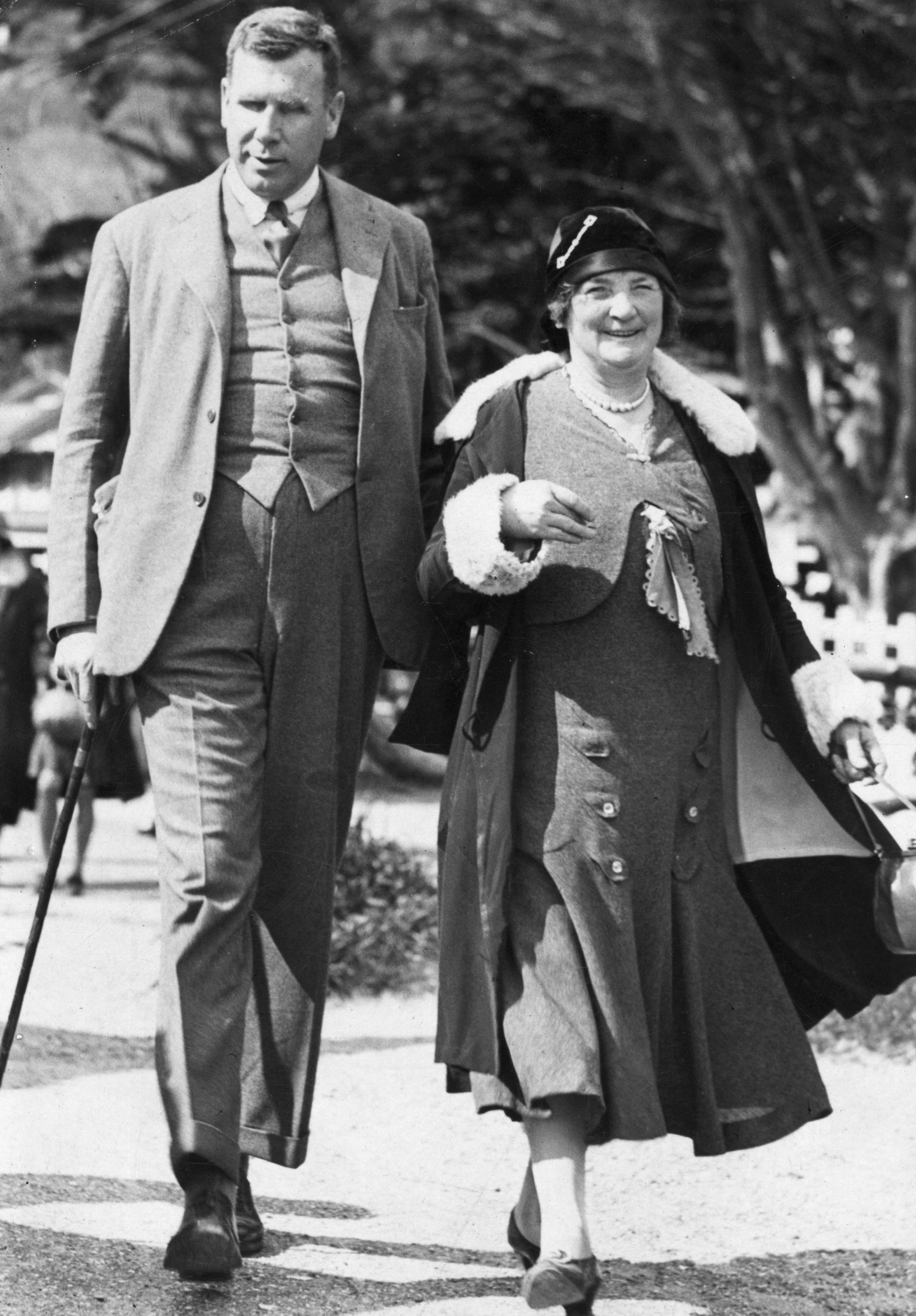
Clutha Mackenzie in 1931

Sir Clutha Nantes Mackenzie (11 February 1895 – 30 March 1966) was a New Zealand politician and worker for the blind. He was briefly a Reform Party Member of Parliament.

== Biography ==
New Zealand Parliament
Years	Term	Electorate	Party
1921–1922	20th	Auckland East	Reform

Mackenzie was born in Balclutha in 1895. He was the youngest child of Sir Thomas Mackenzie, who was High Commissioner in London and was previously a Liberal politician (and Prime Minister in 1912). Mackenzie Jr. enlisted in the Army in World War I. He was blinded at Chunuk Bair during the Gallipoli campaign and was sent to the No. 2 New Zealand General Hospital at Walton-on-Thames to convalesce. At the hospital he was one of the patients of his sister Mary, who was a member of the Voluntary Aid Detachment here. After recovering he was sent to the live with other blind soldiers in a house in Portland before attending St Dunstan's, the Institute for the Blind Soldiers and Sailors. At the institute he learnt Braille as well as how to type.

Mackenzie won the Auckland East electorate in a 1921 by-election after the resignation of Arthur Myers, but was defeated in the next election in 1922 by John A. Lee.

Mackenzie was active in organisations for the blind; he was attached to the UN and was Chairman of the World Braille Council. He was appointed a Knight Bachelor in the 1935 New Year Honours. Later that year he was awarded the King George V Silver Jubilee Medal. In 1953, Mackenzie was awarded the Queen Elizabeth II Coronation Medal.

Mackenzie died in Auckland in 1966, and his ashes were buried in the Dunedin Northern Cemetery.

== Notes ==
New Zealand Parliament
Preceded by Arthur Myers	Member of Parliament for Auckland East; 1921–1922	Succeeded by John A. Lee
