= Fred Bartram =

New Zealand politician

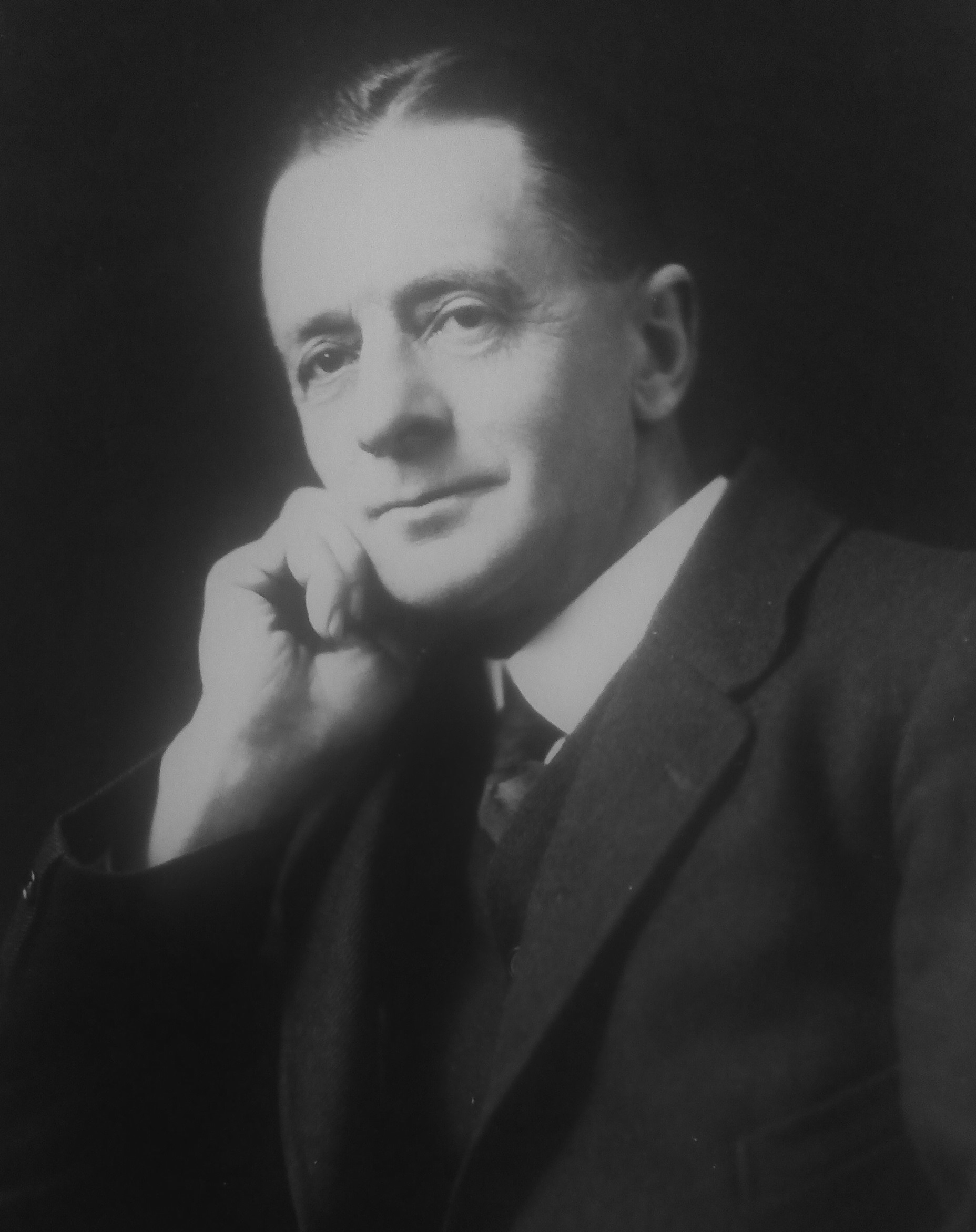

Member of the New Zealand Parliament for Grey Lynn
- In office 17 December 1919 – 14 November 1928
- Preceded by: John Payne
- Succeeded by: John Fletcher

Personal details
- Born: 1869 Warwick, England
- Died: 21 December 1948 (aged 78–79) Auckland, New Zealand
- Party: Labour

Frederick Notley Bartram (1869 – 21 December 1948) was a New Zealand member of parliament for Grey Lynn in Auckland.

== Biography ==
=== Early life ===
Fred Bartram was born in 1869 in England. He attended King's Grammar School, Warwick for his education. In 1890, he left England and sailed to Australia where he lived for five years in Melbourne and in 1892 he married. He then moved to New Zealand in 1895 and took up work as an agent selling life insurance in Christchurch. While in Christchurch, he joined the New Zealand Socialist Party in 1906. He was also secretary of the Addington School Committee.

Later in 1913, whilst in Gisborne, he established the town's branch of the United Labour Party. Later he moved to Auckland.

=== Political career ===
New Zealand Parliament
| Years | Term | Electorate | Party |
|---|---|---|---|
| 1919–1922 | 20th | Grey Lynn | Labour |
| 1922–1925 | 21st | Grey Lynn | Labour |
| 1925–1928 | 22nd | Grey Lynn | Labour |

Fred Bartram held the seat of Grey Lynn from 1919 until 1928 when he was defeated.

In the 1931 general election, Bartram was controversially replaced as the Labour candidate for Grey Lynn by John A. Lee, who won the seat back for Labour. Bartram stood as an Independent Labour candidate in 1931 following the selection scandal, finishing last out of four candidates, and resented Lee thereafter. However, Bartram rejoined the Labour Party in 1940 following the expulsion of Lee and was active in the party's Grey Lynn branch up until his death.

He was also a member of the Auckland City Council between 1929 and 1933. He was also a member of the Auckland Hospital Board, Auckland Drainage Board and Auckland Transport Board.

=== Later life and death ===
Bartram died at his home in Grey Lynn on 21 December 1948 aged 79. He was survived by his wife, four daughters as well as many grandchildren and great-grandchildren.

== Notes ==
New Zealand Parliament
| Preceded by John Payne | Member of Parliament for Grey Lynn; 1919–1928 | Succeeded by John Fletcher |
