= Grey Lynn (electorate) =

Grey Lynn is a former New Zealand parliamentary electorate, in the city of Auckland. It existed from 1902 to 1978, and was represented by nine Members of Parliament.

== Population centres ==
The Representation Act 1900 had increased the membership of the House of Representatives from general electorates 70 to 76, and this was implemented through the 1902 electoral redistribution. In 1902, changes to the country quota affected the three-member electorates in the four main centres. The tolerance between electorates was increased to ±1,250 so that the Representation Commissions (since 1896, there had been separate commissions for the North and South Islands) could take greater account of communities of interest. These changes proved very disruptive to existing boundaries, and six electorates were established for the first time, including Grey Lynn, and two electorates that previously existed were re-established.

During this electorate's existence, it was centred on the suburb of Grey Lynn. In the 1902 election, the electorate was classed as a mix of rural and urban (with a two to one ratio), and comprised areas just west of the central part of Auckland. In the 1907 electoral redistribution, the electorate was classed as fully urban, and the country quota thus no longer applied.

== History ==
The electorate existed from 1902 to 1978. George Fowlds of the Liberal Party was the electorate's first representative. He served for three terms as was beaten in the 1911 election by the independent left-wing politician John Payne.

In 1919 Ellen Melville was one of three women who stood at short notice when women were able to stand as candidates for election to parliament. She stood on behalf of the Reform Party and came second in Grey Lynn.

Grey Lynn was held from the 1919 election by Labour's Fred Bartram until he was defeated in 1928 by John Fletcher of the United Party. During 1930, Fletcher became an independent. There was disagreement in the Labour Party regarding the nomination for the 1931 election, with John A. Lee chosen over their previous representative Fred Bartram, resulting in the latter to stand as an independent. Four candidates stood in total, with Lee defeating the incumbent.

=== Members of Parliament ===
The electorate was represented by nine Members of Parliament.

Key

Liberal Independent Labour Labour Independent United Democratic Labour

Election	Winner
1902 election	George Fowlds
1905 election	George Fowlds
1908 election	George Fowlds
1911 election	John Payne
1914 election	John Payne
1919 election	Fred Bartram
1922 election	Fred Bartram
1925 election	Fred Bartram
1928 election	John Fletcher (Note: John Fletcher became an independent during 1930.)
1931 election	John A. Lee
1935 election	John A. Lee
1938 election	John A. Lee
1943 election	Fred Hackett
1946 election	Fred Hackett
1949 election	Fred Hackett
1951 election	Fred Hackett
1954 election	Fred Hackett
1957 election	Fred Hackett
1960 election	Fred Hackett
1963 by-election	Reginald Keeling
1963 election	Ritchie Macdonald
1966 election	Ritchie Macdonald
1969 election	Eddie Isbey
1972 election	Eddie Isbey
1975 election	Eddie Isbey
(Electorate abolished 1978; see Auckland Central)

Table footnotes:

== Election results ==
=== 1975 election ===
1975 general election: Grey Lynn
Party	Candidate	Votes	%	±%
Labour	Eddie Isbey	8,268	51.58	−9.03
National	Jens Meder	5,429	33.87	+6.90
Values	Loren Robb	1,472	9.18	
Social Credit	Bill Ross	977	6.09	−0.94
Socialist Action	Matt Robson	31	0.19	
Socialist Unity	Bruce Skilton	30	0.18	
Majority		2,839	17.71	−15.92
Turnout		16,027	71.99	−13.65
Registered electors		22,262		

=== 1972 election ===
1972 general election: Grey Lynn
Party	Candidate	Votes	%	±%
Labour	Eddie Isbey	9,887	60.61	+16.10
National	Jens Meder	4,400	26.97	+1.09
Social Credit	Bill Ross	1,148	7.03	+2.29
Values	Wayne Houston	814	4.99	
New Democratic	Martin Spratt	63	0.38	
Majority		5,487	33.63	+15.01
Turnout		16,312	85.64	−1.45
Registered electors		19,045		

=== 1969 election ===
1969 general election: Grey Lynn
Party	Candidate	Votes	%	±%
Labour	Eddie Isbey	6,966	44.51	
National	Jens Meder	4,051	25.88	
Independent Labour	Kevin Ryan	3,887	24.84	
Social Credit	Bill Ross	743	4.74	−6.19
Majority		2,915	18.62	
Turnout		15,647	87.09	+4.25
Registered electors		17,965		

=== 1966 election ===
1966 general election: Grey Lynn
Party	Candidate	Votes	%	±%
Labour	Ritchie Macdonald	8,329	59.77	−2.24
National	Horace Alexander Nash	3,930	28.20	
Social Credit	Bill Ross	1,523	10.93	+5.09
Communist	Peter McAra	152	1.09	
Majority		4,399	31.57	−3.06
Turnout		13,934	82.84	−2.46
Registered electors		16,820		

=== 1963 election ===
1963 general election: Grey Lynn
Party	Candidate	Votes	%	±%
Labour	Ritchie Macdonald	9,383	62.01	
National	Jolyon Firth	4,598	30.38	
Social Credit	Bill Ross	885	5.84	+1.96
Communist	George Jackson	264	1.74	−0.28
Majority		5,240	34.63	
Turnout		15,130	85.30	+43.82
Registered electors		17,737		

=== 1963 by-election ===
1963 Grey Lynn by-election
Party	Candidate	Votes	%	±%
Labour	Reginald Keeling	4,172	65.84	
National	Ray Presland	1,791	28.26	
Social Credit	Bill Ross	246	3.88	
Communist	George Jackson	128	2.02	
Informal votes		24	0.38	
Majority		2,381	37.57	
Turnout		6,361	41.48	−44.66
Registered electors		15,336		
Labour hold		Swing		

=== 1960 election ===
1960 general election: Grey Lynn
Party	Candidate	Votes	%	±%
Labour	Fred Hackett	8,761	63.78	−3.37
National	Brian Zouch	4,165	30.32	
Social Credit	Frederick Thomas Morley	693	5.04	
Communist	Dick Wolf	117	0.85	
Majority		4,596	33.45	−5.83
Turnout		13,736	86.14	−7.57
Registered electors		15,945		

=== 1957 election ===
1957 general election: Grey Lynn
Party	Candidate	Votes	%	±%
Labour	Fred Hackett	9,893	67.15	+2.51
National	Bernard Griffiths	4,106	27.87	
Social Credit	Ernest Richard James	733	4.97	
Majority		5,787	39.28	+2.65
Turnout		14,732	93.71	+2.79
Registered electors		15,720		

=== 1954 election ===
1954 general election: Grey Lynn
Party	Candidate	Votes	%	±%
Labour	Fred Hackett	8,483	64.64	−0.35
National	Tom McGowan	3,676	28.01	
Social Credit	Samuel Hank Charles Jones	835	6.36	
Communist	Rita Smith	129	0.98	
Majority		4,807	36.63	+6.65
Turnout		13,123	90.92	+2.25
Registered electors		14,432		

=== 1951 election ===
1951 general election: Grey Lynn
Party	Candidate	Votes	%	±%
Labour	Fred Hackett	8,265	64.99	+6.95
National	Harold Barry	4,452	35.01	
Majority		3,813	29.98	−11.98
Turnout		12,717	88.67	−5.23
Registered electors		14,341		

=== 1949 election ===
1949 general election: Grey Lynn
Party	Candidate	Votes	%	±%
Labour	Fred Hackett	7,362	58.04	−14.40
National	John Leon Faulkner	3,159	24.02	
Democratic Labour	John A. Lee	2,627	19.98	
Majority		4,203	41.96	−2.93
Turnout		13,148	93.90	−0.98
Registered electors		14,002		

=== 1946 election ===
1946 general election: Grey Lynn
Party	Candidate	Votes	%	±%
Labour	Fred Hackett	9,537	72.44	+13.43
National	Harold Barry	3,627	27.56	
Majority		5,910	44.89	+9.17
Turnout		13,164	94.28	−0.07
Registered electors		13,962		

=== 1943 election ===
1943 general election: Grey Lynn
Party	Candidate	Votes	%	±%
Labour	Fred Hackett	10,010	59.01	
Democratic Labour	John A. Lee	3,951	23.29	−56.26
National	Ellen Melville	2,802	16.52	
Real Democracy	Joseph Alexander Govan	410	2.42	−18.03
People's Movement	George Edward Plane	91	0.54	
Informal votes		322	1.86	+0.03
Majority		6,059	35.72	−23.38
Turnout		17,286	94.35	+1.67
Registered electors		18,321		

=== 1938 election ===
1938 general election: Grey Lynn
Party	Candidate	Votes	%	±%
Labour	John A. Lee	11,584	79.55	+4.78
National	Joseph Alexander Govan	2,977	20.45	
Informal votes		272	1.83	−1.05
Majority		8,607	59.10	−1.85
Turnout		14,833	92.68	+3.52
Registered electors		16,005		

=== 1935 election ===
1935 general election: Grey Lynn
Party	Candidate	Votes	%	±%
Labour	John A. Lee	9,828	74.77	+16.99
United	George Wildish	1,816	13.81	
Democrat	Hilton Basil Moore Arthur	1,290	9.81	
Communist	Henry Mornington Smith	210	1.59	
Informal votes		379	2.88	+2.00
Majority		8,012	60.95	+33.27
Turnout		13,144	89.16	+5.90
Registered electors		14,741		

=== 1931 election ===
1931 general election: Grey Lynn
Party	Candidate	Votes	%	±%
Labour	John A. Lee	6,767	57.78	
Independent	John Fletcher	3,525	30.10	−16.43
United	Walter Harry Murray	1,037	8.85	
Independent Labour	Fred Bartram	382	3.26	−42.73
Informal votes		104	0.88	−0.18
Majority		3,242	27.68	
Turnout		11,815	83.26	−4.07
Registered electors		14,190		

=== 1928 election ===
1928 general election: Grey Lynn
Party	Candidate	Votes	%	±%
United	John Fletcher	5,489	46.53	
Labour	Fred Bartram	5,425	45.99	−6.67
Reform	Patrick Buckley Fitzherbert	684	5.79	
Independent	Louisa Paterson	72	0.61	
Informal votes		126	1.06	−0.26
Majority		64	0.54	
Turnout		11,796	87.33	−3.47
Registered electors		13,507		

=== 1925 election ===
1925 general election: Grey Lynn
Party	Candidate	Votes	%	±%
Labour	Fred Bartram	6,061	52.66	−3.73
Reform	Ellen Melville	5,296	46.01	
Informal votes		152	1.32	+0.07
Majority		765	6.64	−7.40
Turnout		11,509	90.80	−1.75
Registered electors		12,674		

=== 1922 election ===
1922 general election: Grey Lynn
Party	Candidate	Votes	%	±%
Labour	Fred Bartram	5,648	56.39	+20.37
Reform	William John Holdsworth	4,241	42.34	
Informal votes		126	1.25	−0.10
Majority		1,407	14.04	+8.53
Turnout		10,015	92.55	+6.49
Registered electors		10,821		

=== 1919 election ===
1919 general election: Grey Lynn
Party	Candidate	Votes	%	±%
Labour	Fred Bartram	3,141	36.02	
Reform	Ellen Melville	2,660	30.51	
Liberal	George Fowlds	2,405	27.58	
Independent	Lindsay Garmson	214	2.45	
Independent Labour	Paul Richardson	180	2.06	
Informal votes		118	1.35	−0.33
Majority		481	5.51	
Turnout		8,718	86.06	−0.14
Registered electors		10,130		

=== 1914 election ===
1914 general election: Grey Lynn
Party	Candidate	Votes	%	±%
Independent Labour	John Payne	2,933	34.04	−16.07
Reform	Murdoch McLean	2,844	33.01	
United Labour	George Fowlds	2,838	32.94	−16.62
Informal votes		145	1.68	+1.37
Majority		89	1.03	+0.49
Turnout		8,615	86.20	+5.09
Registered electors		9,994		

=== 1911 election ===
1911 general election: Grey Lynn, first ballot
Party	Candidate	Votes	%	±%
Liberal	George Fowlds	3,117	44.64	−9.94
Independent Labour	John Payne	2,191	31.38	
Reform	Walter Harry Murray	1,568	22.45	
Informal votes		106	1.51	−0.57
Turnout		6,982	81.79	−0.41
Second ballot result
Independent Labour	John Payne	3,470	50.11	+18.73
Liberal	George Fowlds	3,432	49.56	+4.92
Informal votes		22	0.31	−1.20
Majority		38	0.54	
Turnout		6,924	81.11	−0.68
Registered electors		8,536		

=== 1908 election ===
1908 general election: Grey Lynn, first ballot
Party	Candidate	Votes	%	±%
Liberal	George Fowlds	4,035	54.58	+3.00
Conservative	Oliver Nicholson	3,146	42.55	
Independent Labour	James Ulysses Brown	57	0.77	
Informal votes		154	2.08	+1.16
Majority		889	12.02	+7.92
Turnout		7,392	82.20	+0.87
Registered electors		8,992		

=== 1905 election ===
1905 general election: Grey Lynn
Party	Candidate	Votes	%	±%
Liberal	George Fowlds	2,891	51.58	−0.15
Conservative	John Farrell	2,661	47.48	
Informal votes		52	0.92	+1.95
Majority		230	4.10	+1.23
Turnout		5,604	81.33	+5.71
Registered electors		6,890		

=== 1902 election ===
1902 general election: Grey Lynn
Party	Candidate	Votes	%	±%
Liberal	George Fowlds	2,108	51.43	
Liberal–Labour	Thomas Taylor Masefield	1,990	48.56	
Majority		118	2.87	
Turnout		4,098	75.62	
Registered electors		5,419		
