= Lee affair =

1930s political scandal in New Zealand

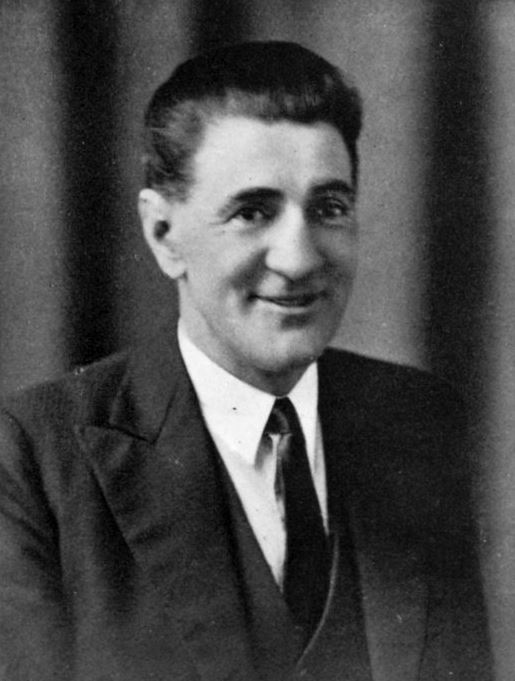
John A. Lee

The Lee affair was an event that transpired in the late 1930s in New Zealand revolving around the unequivocally socialist Labour Party MP John A. Lee and his repeated public critiques of his party's leadership. The affair culminated in Lee's expulsion from the Labour Party in March 1940. He subsequently established his own political party, the further-left Democratic Labour Party, causing a sizeable rift in Labour Party membership. The events have been described as the Labour Party's first major crisis of identity, with the nature of the dispute and the manner of its resolution significantly affecting the subsequent development of the party for decades. Lee's biographer, Erik Olssen, described the Lee affair as having "marked a key battle in the triumph of authority over democracy."

== Background ==
In-between the 1931 and 1935 elections a division of opinion began to manifest in the Labour Party caucus as to whether loans or credit should be the primary method of funding economic recovery and end the effects of the Great Depression. As a result, financial affairs were beginning to dominate party policy and general Labour concerns. This led to the development inside caucus of a monetary reform group, mainly from the more militant socialist wing of the party under the leadership of John A. Lee.

Throughout the 1930s many Labour MPs had communicated clumsily on the concept of credit leading to confusion as to the party's exact position. This left Labour in a difficult position when eventually elected.

== Guarded criticism ==
Lee became something of a Young Turk in the Labour ranks. He seemed impatient with the party leadership which he believed to belong to an older generation. During the selection of his Cabinet, in both 1935 and in 1938, Prime Minister Michael Joseph Savage had ignored Lee's personal appeals for insertion, thinking him too wild and unconventional. Eventually Savage compromised making Lee an under-secretary – a post not previously known in New Zealand politics. Undoubtedly the largest reason for Lee's exclusion was that Savage personally disliked him. The two had a history of opposing each other on policy issues (notably Savage's loan proposals) and Lee opposed his selection as leader in 1933. When Savage announced his cabinet to caucus, it was clear that the caucus felt that Lee had been unjustly treated. More importantly, both of Savage's chief lieutenants Peter Fraser and Walter Nash thought Lee should have a place, and it was they who prevailed upon Savage to include him at the cabinet table on issues related to his role as Under-Secretary to the Prime Minister.

The treatment Lee received turned out to be a great mistake. Some very ordinary men had been included, for geographical considerations, like Jones, or from old loyalties, like Webb. An able and aggressive man like Lee might more justly and more wisely have been given a very demanding job. To make him Under-Secretary to a man with whom he did not get on [Savage] was worse than casting him aside.

At the beginning of 1936 Lee got the impression in cabinet that the government hoped to postpone a pledge to guarantee prices for a year and were abandoning party policy. Typically impatient and resentful, Lee thought cabinet were acting as a brake on financial progress, but Walter Nash thought Lee's views were an illusion born of frustration and boredom, as he was given very little to do. In fact both ministers and public servants alike were proceeding with immense drive, but having a man so disaffected at cabinet meetings was becoming counter-productive. Savage decided that he should instead be put in charge of state housing; and later in the year Lee became Under-Secretary to finance minister Nash instead.

After finally winning the Treasury benches, the initial sense of camaraderie and intra-party democracy which had given such vivacity to Labour, steadily declined as a result of the burdens of office. The senior leadership seemed somewhat inclined to simply disregard caucus decisions that they disliked leaving some MPs feeling begrudged. Credit theory was one such topic where this was prevalent. It was not always the case and in some instances Cabinet accepted public credit measures for projects, but only after being pushed into it by a large caucus majority. Lee and his socialistic allies, were also greatly influenced by social credit theory. They believed that the government needed to immediately take control of New Zealand's financial system. The fiscally conservative Finance Minister Nash opposed this, and blocked Lee's proposals to nationalise the Bank of New Zealand.

Such antagonism between Lee's followers and Nash's highlighted a larger division. The older members enjoyed support of the trade unions. Hence, they were able to drive the party vehicle as they pleased. By contrast, the pro-Lee dissidents were mostly individual members who supported Labour out of their own intellectual morals and principles rather than out of possessing a working-class background. Lee gained allies in the party who had such backgrounds and attempted a backbench revolt after the 1938 election to pressure the election of cabinet by the caucus. After a bitter debate amongst MPs the proposal was successful 26 votes to 23 however Savage over-ruled the vote and proceeded to inform the press that cabinet would remain unchanged.

The episode became more and more public over time. That it should have developed in the way it did was largely the result of Lee's own personality. While he was generally conceded to have great intellectual and oratorical gifts, it was widely considered that excessive vanity and obstreperousness clouded his judgement. However, Lee was by no means the sole source of the friction in caucus, which intensified from 1936 to 1940, but he was in personality, its focus, by pressing his opinions and rebuttals further than any other fellow dissentients.

== Rebellion ==
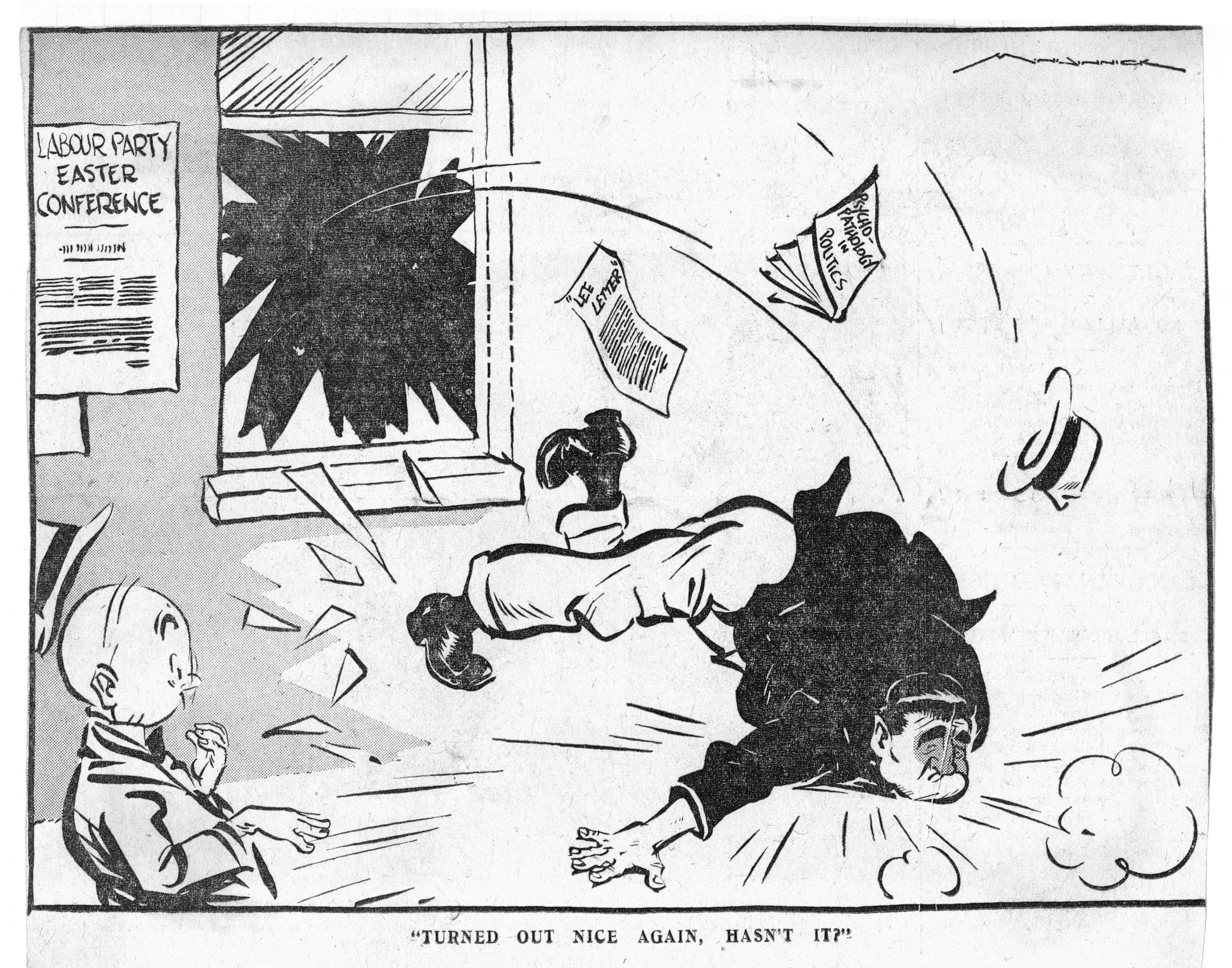
A cartoon showing Lee thrown out the window of the 1940 Labour Party Conference.

When Savage relented, to the extent of increasing by one the number of cabinet ministers, he selected David Wilson (and not Lee) as the extra minister. To Lee's fury his fellow dissidents nominated Gervan McMillan rather than himself for the position, Wilson winning 19 votes to 15. In December 1938 the infamous "Lee Letter" appeared. It contained many attacks on the financial orthodoxy and over-cautiousness of Walter Nash. It received wide publicity and led many in the public to question Labour's unanimity. Lee professed to have written it under the supposition that it would be seen only by Labour members, not the populace.

The Labour National Executive called Lee to appear before it, and gave him warnings about the consequences to himself of such behaviour. However, Lee continued his attacks on the leadership, more and more publicly. It was to be an article bitterly accusing the cancer-stricken Savage of being "mentally as well as physically ill" that proved to be Lee's downfall. In a 1939 article entitled 'Psycho-pathology in politics', Lee wrote:

An odd politician becomes physically, becomes mentally sick ... sycophants pour flattery on him ... He becomes vain of mind and short of temper. Whatever this problem of what I call pathology in politics occurred, except that the party managed to cut off the diseased limb, it went down to crashing defeat.

Party and public alike were aghast that someone would write so critically of a prime minister who was widely known to be desperately sick. Lee was then sacked as an under-secretary by Savage and over 50 party branches endorsed Lee's expulsion. Without any preliminary notice, his expulsion from the Labour Party was moved at the 1940 annual conference. Following a rancorous deliberation by members, the motion was carried by a vote of 546 to 344. Lee's final conduct made it near impossible for many of his sympathisers to defend him, even if he retained a certain following among some supporters who continued to agree with his criticisms of cabinet autocracy. Savage died a day later.

== Outcomes ==
The consequences of the Lee affair were unfortunate for the Labour Party. His dismissal reduced the enthusiasm of the party's members, with many active branch workers either resigning or returning to mere membership. In some areas whole branches were reported to have disappeared altogether, though the impact of World War II also made some impact on membership reduction. Nevertheless, it coincided with the establishment of Lee's new breakaway party the Democratic Labour Party founded in April 1940 just after Lee's expulsion. When Lee was expelled the Labour Party had 51,175 members. After just one year membership had sunk to 35,481 and after the 1943 election it had receded to a mere 13,995. The party attracted many of the more radical and disenchanted Labour members, but more importantly only one of Lee's sympathisers in Parliament joined him, Bill Barnard.

The Democratic Labour Party contested the 1943 election though it performed poorly with both Lee and Barnard losing their seats (Barnard had run as an independent, disagreeing with Lee's autocratic running of the DLP). With no parliamentary presence the party vanished into the political oblivion. Gaining 4.3% of the vote, the Democratic Labour Party did fulfil its one expectation of splitting the Labour vote, costing Labour several marginal electorates. This allowed the opposition National Party to gain 9 seats, though Labour still remained in office.

== See also ==
- List of political scandals in New Zealand
