= John A. Lee =

New Zealand politician (1891–1982)

John A. Lee DCM
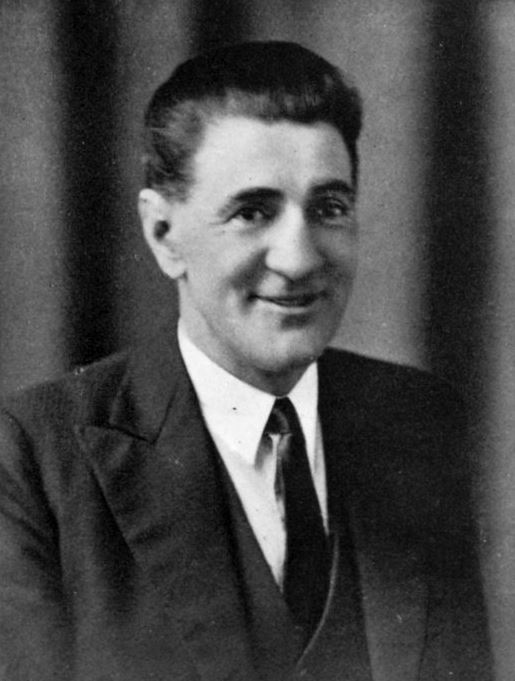

Member of the New Zealand Parliament for Grey Lynn
- In office 2 December 1931 – 25 September 1943
- Preceded by: John Fletcher
- Succeeded by: Fred Hackett

Member of the New Zealand Parliament for Auckland East
- In office 7 December 1922 – 14 November 1928
- Preceded by: Clutha Mackenzie
- Succeeded by: James Donald

Personal details
- Born: 31 October 1891 Dunedin, New Zealand
- Died: 13 June 1982 (aged 90) Auckland, New Zealand
- Party: Democratic Labour Party (1940–49); Labour Party (1919–40)
- Spouse: Mollie Lee
- Parent: Mary Isabella Taylor (mother)
- Awards: Distinguished Conduct Medal

Military service
- Allegiance: New Zealand Army
- Years of service: 1916-18
- Rank: Private
- Battles/wars: World War I

John Alfred Alexander Lee DCM (31 October 1891 – 13 June 1982) was a New Zealand politician and writer. He is one of the more prominent avowed socialists in New Zealand's political history.

Lee was elected as a member of parliament in 1922. After the Labour Party's victory in 1935, Lee was passed over for appointment to cabinet, instead becoming an under-secretary. He became a critic of the leadership of his party and was expelled in 1940, subsequently founding his own left-wing party, the Democratic Labour Party. He lost his parliamentary seat at the 1943 election.

== Biography ==
=== Early life ===
Lee was born in Dunedin in 1891, the son of Alfred Lee and Mary Isabella Taylor. His parents were not married, and at the time of his birth, they had already separated due to his father's gambling and alcoholism. Lee's mother had little income, and the family experienced considerable financial hardship. Lee did not do well at school, and he was often truant. In 1905, he left school to work, and became involved in petty crime. In 1908, he was convicted of theft, and served time at a boarding school for juvenile delinquents. He attempted to escape several times and was eventually successful. Historian Erik Olssen has documented that after wandering the country for a time, Lee found work in Raetihi, but was then jailed for liquor smuggling and breaking and entering.

Three years after being released, Lee enlisted in the New Zealand Expeditionary Force, and served in World War I. He was awarded the Distinguished Conduct Medal for action at Messines in June 1917, but was repatriated after being wounded in March 1918 and losing his left arm. He arrived back in New Zealand in July 1919, and established a small business. Lee wrote a novel Citizen into Soldier in 1937 inspired by his wartime experiences.

=== Early political career ===
New Zealand Parliament
Years	Term	Electorate	Party
1922–1925	21st	Auckland East	Labour
1925–1928	22nd	Auckland East	Labour
1931–1935	24th	Grey Lynn	Labour
1935–1938	25th	Grey Lynn	Labour
1938–1940	26th	Grey Lynn	Labour
1940–1943	Changed allegiance to:		Democratic Labour

Not long after returning home, Lee became active in the Labour Party. Lee had been a committed socialist for some time, having read a large amount of Marxist literature over the years. He is said to have heard the speeches of Bob Semple and Harry Scott Bennett through the bars of his jail cell, and in the army, he had been known as "Bolshie Lee" for his views. Lee's status as a veteran was considered valuable by the Labour Party, as the party's anti-conscription stance had caused many to brand it unpatriotic — Lee, a decorated and wounded soldier, was able to counter this perception quite effectively. By 1920, Lee was on the Labour Party's national executive.

In 1921, Lee contested the by-election in the Auckland East electorate caused by the resignation of Arthur Myers, but he was defeated by Clutha Mackenzie. Historian Olssen claimed that Lee "emerged with enhanced mana" from the campaign after strong speeches on key aspects of Labour's policies in the areas of education, the establishment of a state shipping service, management of speculation around land purchases and the establishment of public works. He was said to have focused on reaching both skilled and unskilled workers and their wives, campaigning for a free nationalised medical service, stronger national systems to support unemployed and provide sickness insurance, extension of entitlement to pensions and endorsement of "equality between the sexes". Lee's arguments were all seen by Olssen as supporting the main position of the Labour Party: "that the cake should be divided more equitably and democracy perfected". In the 1922 general election, however, he stood again and was elected, continuing to speak on equity issues in education, in support of Labour's policy that equality of opportunity was key for the health and education of the young to build economic growth. It has been said that in his speeches on defence, Lee went beyond the party's pacifist position, but he did gain some influence by being elected to a sub-committee to establish a defence policy. He soon became one of the better known Members of Parliament, noted for his powerful oratory and strong views. He also played a considerable role in the Labour Party's internal policy formulation, where he had a strong interest in foreign affairs, defence and economics.

Lee was re-elected in the 1925 election for Auckland East with a majority of 750, but (he later claimed) because of boundary changes, he was narrowly defeated (by 37 votes) in the 1928 election. In 1927 the Representation Commission had proposed altering the boundaries of the Parnell electorate; which if confirmed would have made the electorate "dry" or no-licence, and without an authority which could issue temporary licences for the Ellerslie and Alexandra Park raceways. Following objections, the boundary between the Parnell and Auckland East electorates was adjusted to include a hotel in the Parnell electorate (so retaining its licensing committee).

So after the 1928 election, Lee took a job managing the Palace Hotel in Rotorua (though he did not drink) for Ernest Davis.

In the 1931 election, Lee won the electorate of Grey Lynn, having controversially defeated another former MP, Fred Bartram, for the Labour nomination. The major political issue of the day was the Great Depression, and Lee played a significant role in the formulation of Labour's economic policies. Lee also wrote his first novel, Children of the Poor — the book was largely autobiographical, and was a considerable success. The book argued that poverty generated crime and vice, and that only a socialist programme could solve society's problems. He produced a sequel The Hunted in 1936. In the early 1930s Lee served on the Auckland Rugby League's board and later served as chairman. In 1935, he was awarded the King George V Silver Jubilee Medal.

Lee caused ructions in the Auckland Labour Party ahead of the 1935 mayoral election. He incited a selection controversy after the Labour Party selected local businessman Joe Sayegh over prominent lawyer and MP Rex Mason at the behest of Auckland Labour Representation Committee executive Fred Young. Sayegh was regarded as a competent city councillor and respectable individual, but he was given little chance of defeating Citizens Committee candidate Ernest Davis (Lee's former employer). As Young had also been employed by Davis for many years, Lee and several other Labour MPs asserted that Young had been bribed by Davis to make certain the selection of a weak Labour mayoral candidate for the mayoralty.Lee agitated against Sayegh's campaign and tried to discredit him, labeling him as a "dumb wop fellow who could not even speak English". Despite Lee's interference, Sayegh polled better than anticipated in the election, losing to Davis by only 363 votes and topping the poll in the council vote where Labour secured a majority.

=== Rebel ===
When Labour won the 1935 election with a large majority, and formed its first government, many expected Lee to enter Cabinet. However, Lee did not have the support of Michael Joseph Savage, the new prime minister. Savage appears to have considered Lee too radical and uncontrolled, while Lee considered Savage too cautious. The two had clashed on a number of policy issues, and in the end, Lee was not awarded ministerial rank — instead, he became an under-secretary. This position did not, however, have any legal authority until the following year, when Lee threatened to resign. Given responsibility for housing, Lee quickly moved to implement a "socialist" plan for state housing, with the construction of many new dwellings for the poor.

While Lee was highly enthusiastic about his housing program, he became increasingly unhappy with the new government's economic policies, which he saw as overly cautious. Lee gradually emerged as the leader of Labour's left-wing faction, opposed primarily by the more orthodox Minister of Finance, Walter Nash. Lee and his allies, as well as being strongly socialist, were influenced by social credit theory, and believed that the government should take immediate control of the country's financial system. Nash opposed this, and was able to block proposals put forward by Lee to nationalise the Bank of New Zealand. Gradually, Lee's criticism of the Labour Party's leadership became increasingly public.

As well as arguing for a more socialist policy platform, Lee also criticised the Labour Party's internal structure. In particular, he sought to abolish the tradition of having the Prime Minister appoint Cabinet — instead, he wished Cabinet to be elected by caucus. This was rejected by Savage, and Lee began to portray himself not merely as a campaigner for socialism but as a campaigner for internal party democracy. This stance won Lee considerable support from those who otherwise disliked his views. Lee's attacks came at a time of considerable difficulty for the Labour Party — Michael Joseph Savage was now seriously ill, and World War II was breaking out.

=== Departure from the Labour Party ===
Lee was censured by the Labour Party conference of 1939, but continued to attack Labour's leaders for what Lee regarded as Labour's failure to implement socialist policies. On 25 March 1940, Lee was finally expelled from the Labour Party. Lee subsequently published a further attack on Savage and his leadership of the Labour Party entitled "Expelled from the Labour Party for telling the truth: psycho-pathology in politics". Savage died two days later, and was succeeded as prime minister by Peter Fraser, a member of the faction opposed to Lee's left-wingers. Lee quickly announced the establishment of the new Democratic Labour Party, with himself as leader. He was joined by Bill Barnard, the Speaker and former Mid-Canterbury Labour MP Horace Herring. Others like John Payne, Labour MP Rex Mason and Independent MP Harry Atmore were sympathetic to the party.

However, Lee soon alienated many of his supporters (including Barnard) with what was seen as an "autocratic" leadership style, ironic considering his complaints against Savage. In the 1943 election, the Democratic Labour Party put forward 52 candidates, including Keith Hay, Alfred E. Allen and Colin Scrimgeour (who stood against Peter Fraser in Wellington Central). The DLP won only 4.3% of the vote, Lee lost his seat to Labour candidate Fred Hackett, and none were elected. Barnard stood as an Independent and also lost. The DLP did not stand any candidates in the 1946 election, but Lee stood as the sole DLP candidate for Grey Lynn in the 1949 election and got 2,627 votes, coming third.

=== Death and legacy ===
Although his parliamentary career was over, Lee continued to write. He remained strongly hostile to the Labour Party, and denounced its leaders as traitors to the working class. In 1963, he published his political memoirs, entitled Simple on a Soap-box. He continued to comment on political matters for some time, although he surprised many with his defence of the United States in the Vietnam War. He was awarded an honorary LLD by the University of Otago in 1969. Lee died in Auckland in 1982. His wife, Marie (Mollie) Lee, had died in 1976. They had no children, although they raised Lee's three nephews after his sister's death. Lee was cremated at Purewa Cemetery and Crematorium.

In his will, Lee asked that his private papers be deposited with Auckland Libraries a year after his death. Amongst his papers are his scrapbooks, which reflect his opinionated personality. Photographs and newspaper clippings have been attached with pink elastoplast. There are numerous annotations in red ballpoint - welcoming to family and friends but fostered grudges against his foes for decades.

Bill Pearson wrote "People condemned the novels of John A. Lee out of Puritanism but they did not doubt that he was lifting the screen from the indecent truth."

In 1989, Mervyn Thompson adapted Children of the Poor into a successful musical play.

In 1975 the corner at the intersection of Great North Road and Point Chevalier Road, in the Auckland suburb of Point Chevalier, was named after Lee, as was a new block of pensioner flats nearby.

In 2017, Lee's personal document archives held at Auckland Libraries were included in the UNESCO Memory of the World Aotearoa New Zealand Ngā Mahara o te Ao register.

== Sporting involvement ==
Lee was also involved with sport. In 1924 he was the patron of the Parnell Rugby League Football Club. He was the president of the Newton Rangers Rugby League club in 1933 and was heavily involved with Auckland Rugby League being the president for many years until his retirement from the position at the start of 1942.

== Works ==
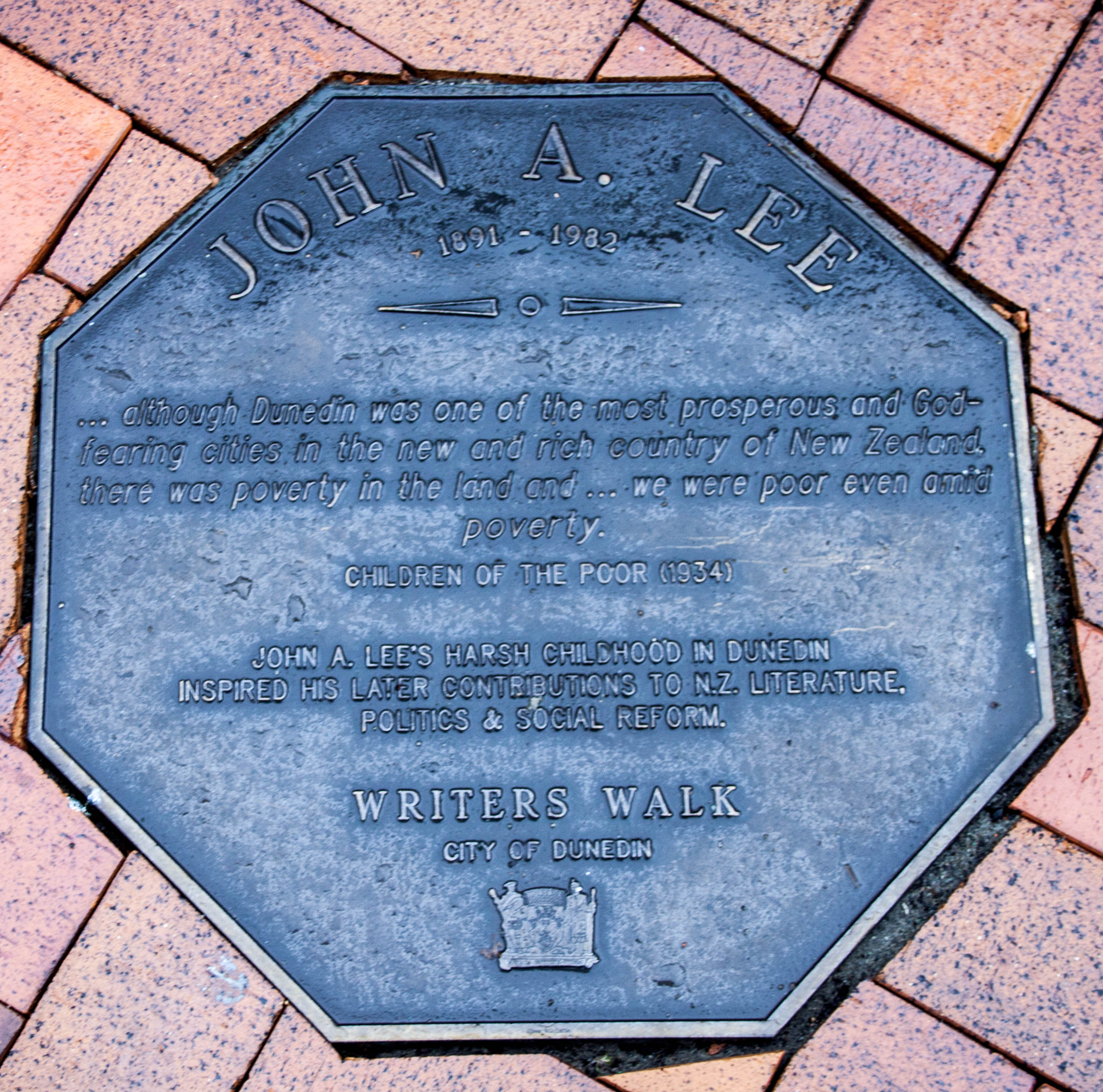
Memorial plaque dedicated to John A. Lee in Dunedin, on the Writers' Walk on the Octagon

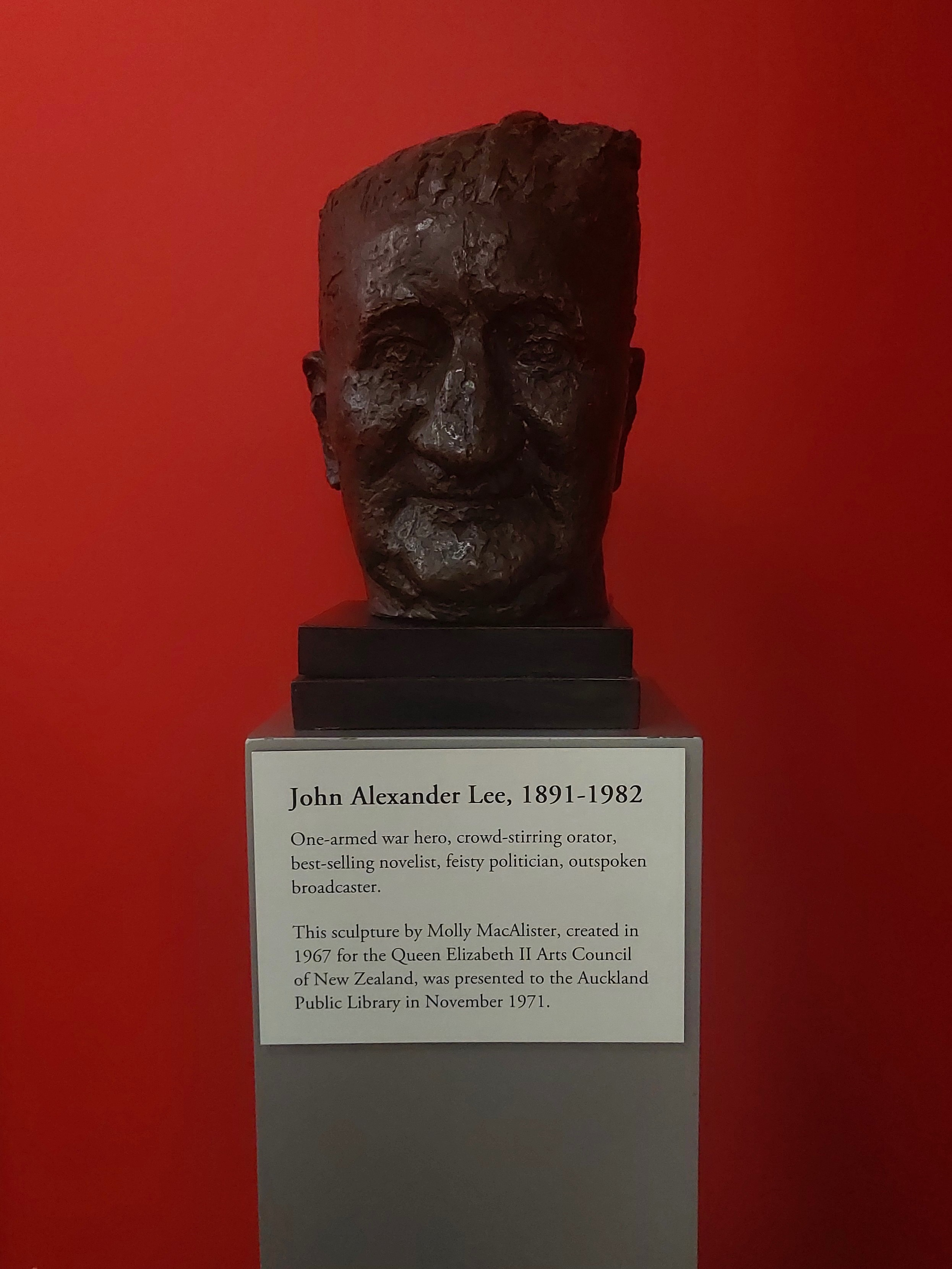
Head of John A. Lee sculpted by Molly Macalister, 1967. Heritage Collections Reading Room, Central City Library, Auckland.

Books (first publication)

- Children of the Poor, 1934.
- The Hunted, 1936.
- Civilian into Soldier, 1937.
- Socialism in New Zealand, 1938.
- The Yanks are Coming, 1943.
- Shining with the Shiner, 1944.
- Simple on a Soapbox, 1963.
- Shiner Slattery, 1964
- Rhetoric at the Red Dawn, 1965.
- The Lee Way to Public Speaking, 1965
- Delinquent Days, 1967.
- Mussolini's Millions, 1970
- Political Notebooks, 1973.
- For Mine is the Kingdom, 1975
- Soldier, 1976
- The Scrim-Lee Papers. 1976 (with CG Scrimgeour & Tony Simson)
- Roughnecks, Rolling Stones & Rouseabouts, 1977
- Early Days in New Zealand, 1977
- The John A. Lee Diaries 1936–1940, 1981
- The Politician, 1987 (but written in 1936.)

Plus numerous pamphlets mainly published during his political days. Lee also produced a political journal, "John A Lee's Weekly" (which underwent several name changes) from 1940 to 1954.

New Zealand Parliament
Preceded by Clutha Mackenzie	Member of Parliament for Auckland East; 1922–1928	Succeeded by James Donald
Preceded by John Fletcher	Member of Parliament for Grey Lynn; 1931–1943	Succeeded by Fred Hackett
