= John Payne (New Zealand politician) =

New Zealand politician

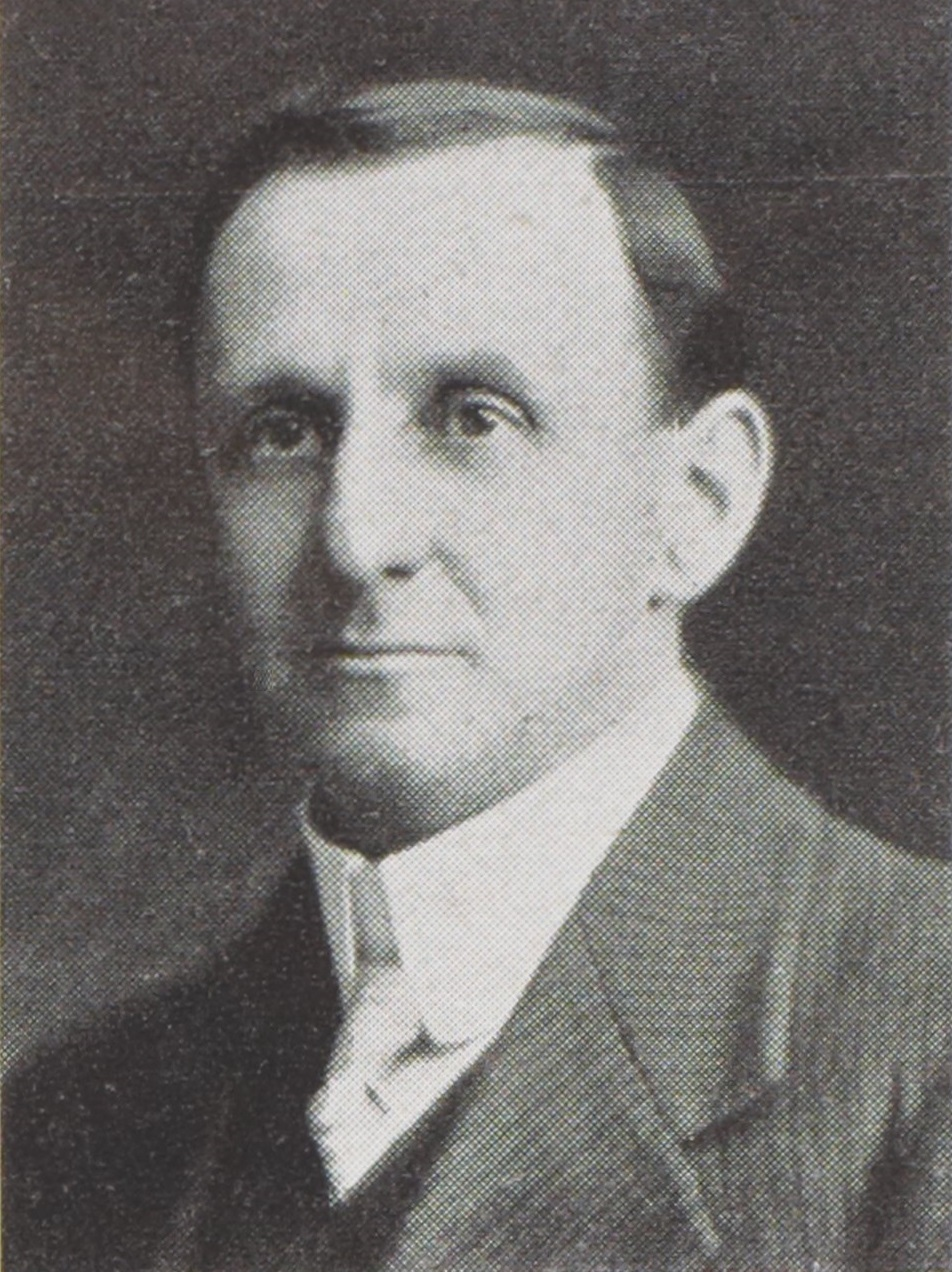

Member of the New Zealand Parliament for Grey Lynn
- In office 14 December 1911 – 17 December 1919
- Preceded by: George Fowlds
- Succeeded by: Fred Bartram

Personal details
- Born: 23 November 1871 Manchester, England
- Died: 27 January 1942 (aged 70) Napier, New Zealand
- Party: Labour

John Payne (23 November 1871 – 27 January 1942) was a New Zealand politician.

== Early years ==
Payne was born in Manchester, England. His father was clerk to a solicitor, and Payne himself initially took up office employment, but later migrated to New Zealand. There, he worked as a farmhand and a goldminer before turning to accountancy. He taught finance in Auckland for a time, and was also involved in the early film business in New Zealand.

== Member of Parliament ==
New Zealand Parliament
Years	Term	Electorate	Party
1911–1914	18th	Grey Lynn	Labour
1914–1916	19th	Grey Lynn	Independent Labour
1916–1919	Changed allegiance to:		Independent

In the 1911 general election, Payne stood for Parliament, contesting the seat of Grey Lynn on a left-wing platform for the original Labour Party. Among his proposals were free tertiary education, legislation to increase the power of workers, an expansion of social welfare, a state bank, and the abolition of the Legislative Council. He was elected, defeating George Fowlds of the Liberal Party in a run-off.

In Parliament, Payne supported the Liberals, despite apparently having agreed to support the Reform Party in exchange for their backing in the Grey Lynn run-off. Accusations were made that he had been bribed, and although these were later withdrawn, Payne's relationship with Reform was severely damaged. In 1913, when the Social Democratic Party was established, Payne unofficially allied himself with it, but did not join. In the 1914 election, Payne was re-elected with Social Democrat support—along with two Social Democrats and three members of the United Labour Party, Payne was part of the loose left-wing grouping in Parliament.

=== Independent ===
When World War I broke out, however, tensions later arose between Payne and his fellow leftists. Payne was a supporter of New Zealand's participation in the war, including the introduction of conscription, which other leftists fiercely opposed.

Payne was also criticised for his strong anti-German sentiment. He was associated with the Anti-German League; he advocated that no man of Austrian or German descent for four generations back should be allowed to enlist, he sent the Army (and tabled in Parliament) a list of 50 people with German names who were guilty of atrocities and of spying for Germany.

When the Social Democrats and the United Labour Party formed the modern Labour Party in 1916, Payne declined to join.

== Later life ==
Payne did not seek re-election in the 1919 New Zealand general election, partly for reasons of health. He lived in Australia until 1935, and served as private secretary to Jack Lang, the Labor Party Premier of New South Wales for a time. After his return to New Zealand, he became a supporter of Labour dissident John A. Lee, and wrote articles for Lee's publication. He died in 1942 from heart failure.

New Zealand Parliament
Preceded by George Fowlds	Member of Parliament for Grey Lynn; 1911–1919	Succeeded by Fred Bartram
