= Democratic Labour Party (New Zealand) =

- Abbreviation: DLP
- Founded: 1940; 85 years ago
- Dissolved: 1949; 76 years ago
- Split from: Labour Party
- Ideology: Democratic socialism Social credit
- Political position: Left-wing

The Democratic Labour Party (DLP) was a left-wing political party in New Zealand in the 1940s. It was a splinter from the larger Labour Party, and was led by the prominent socialist John A. Lee.

== Party history ==
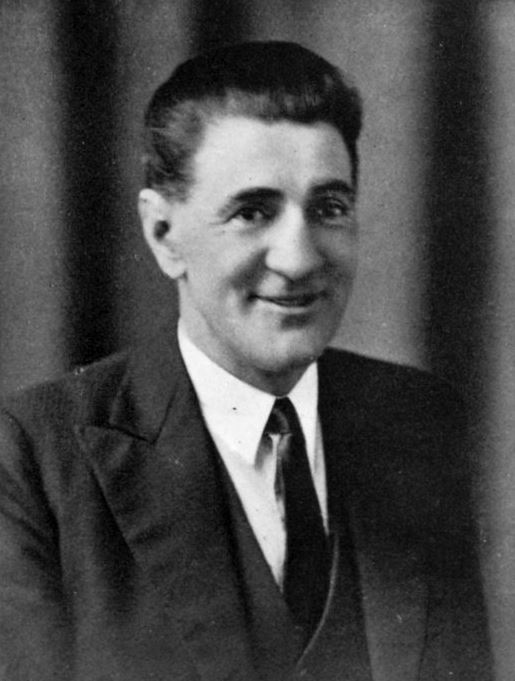
John A. Lee

The Democratic Labour Party originated in the internal disputes within the first Labour Party government, which lasted from 1935 to 1949. The division was primarily between moderates, such as Michael Joseph Savage, Peter Fraser, and Walter Nash, and radicals like Lee. Lee and his allies criticised the "cautious" approach taken by the party's leadership, and advocated a considerably stronger policy line. Lee's views were a mixture of conventional socialist theory and the social credit theory of monetary reform. He was also strongly critical of the Labour Party's internal structures, calling its leadership unaccountable and autocratic. MPs sympathetic to Lee’s credit ideas were Arnold Nordmeyer, Bill Barnard, Clyde Carr, Gervan McMillan and also Bill Anderton, Dan Sullivan, Gordon Hultquist and William John Lyon (Hultquist and Lyon both died while serving in World War II).

In 1940, after a long period of rebellion against the party leadership, Lee was finally expelled from the Labour Party. He quickly moved to establish the Democratic Labour Party. One other MP, Bill Barnard, joined him as well as former Labour MP Horace Herring and at least one other, Rex Mason, gave serious consideration to joining. Former MP John Payne was also sympathetic.

When Savage died, Fraser was tipped to succeed him as Prime Minister. During the ensuing leadership election, two of his dissident opponents, Gervan McMillan and Clyde Carr were Lee sympathizers. Even those openly loyal to the party were divided. However, Fraser did win and Labour stayed on its moderate platform for his decade long spell as party leader.

Before long, however, internal tensions developed in the new party, with Barnard accusing Lee of behaving in an egotistical and autocratic manner — this was ironic, considering Lee's criticism of the old Labour Party leadership on the same grounds.

In the 1943 elections, the DLP fielded 52 candidates including Lee, Keith Hay, Alfred E. Allen, Colin Scrimgeour (who stood against Peter Fraser in Wellington Central) and Norman Douglas. They were all defeated. The DLP candidate for Auckland East, F.O. Leo Steve Dromgoole (RNZAF) got Captain Paul Lenihan (USMC) to drop election leaflets from a C-47 on a “test flight” over Auckland and Devonport on 22 September

Barnard stood for re-election as an independent rather than a DLP candidate, but was also defeated. The Democratic Labour Party received only 4.3% of the total vote, and ceased to exist in 1947.

The party did not stand any candidates in the 1946 general election, but Lee again stood as a DLP candidate in the 1949 general election for the Grey Lynn electorate and got 2,627 votes, coming third.

== See also ==
- Category:Democratic Labour Party (New Zealand) politicians
