= Mayor of Tawa =

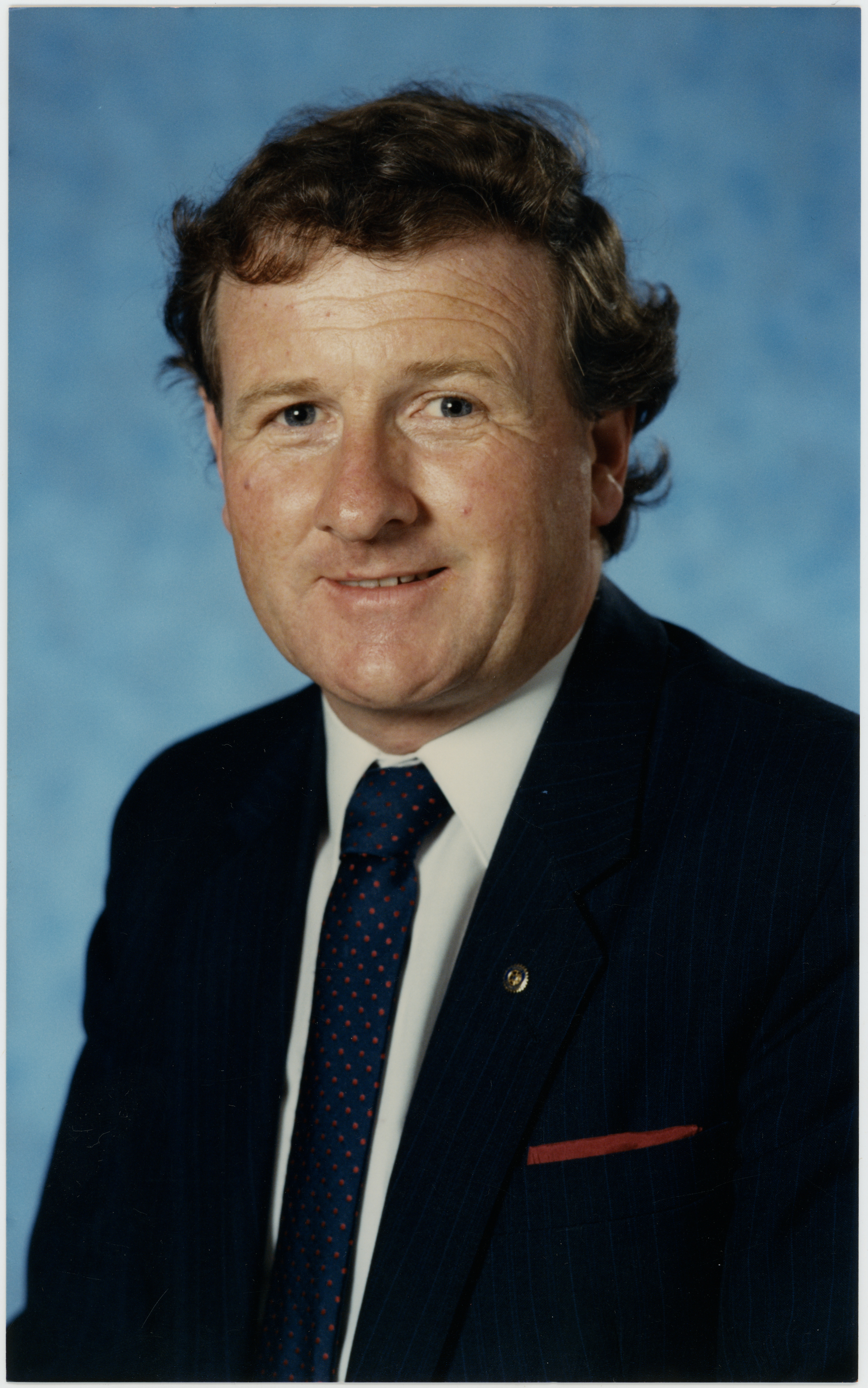
- David Watt, the last mayor of Tawa
- Style: His/Her Worship
- Term length: Three years, renewable
- Inaugural holder: George Turkington
- Formation: 1953
- Final holder: David Watt
- Abolished: 1989
- Superseded by: Mayor of Wellington

The Mayor of Tawa officiated over the Tawa Flat Borough of New Zealand, which was administered by the Tawa Borough Council. The office existed from 1953 until 1989, when Tawa Borough was amalgamated into the Wellington City Council as part of the 1989 local government reforms. There were six holders of the office.

== History ==
The office was preceded by the chairman of the Tawa Town Board. The then chairman, George Turkington, was elected the first mayor in 1953 when Tawa was constituted as a borough. He resigned after only six months in May 1954 after he was appointed to the Local Government Commission. Turkington was replaced by Maurice McDonald "Jock" Davidson, who himself resigned after 18 months after deciding to move elsewhere. Mervyn Kemp then became mayor and held the office for 28 years. Upon Kemp's retirement, councillor Roy Mitchell was elected mayor for three years. Doris Mills (Tawa's only female mayor) was elected in 1986 but died in office on 17 June 1987. The deputy mayor David Watt was acting mayor until a by-election was held where Watt was elected mayor, becoming Tawa's final mayor.

Upon amalgamation with the Wellington City Council, Watt was elected a councillor for the new Tawa Ward alongside Tawa Borough Councillor Kerry Prendergast. He served as Wellington's deputy-mayor from 1989 until he retired in 1995. Prendergast succeeded him as deputy from 1995 to 2001, when she was elected Mayor of Wellington, a post she was to hold until 2010 when she was defeated.

== List of mayors ==
Mayors of Tawa were:

	Name	Term
1	George Turkington	1953–1954
2	Jock Davidson	1954–1955
3	Mervyn Kemp CBE	1955–1983
4	Roy Mitchell	1983–1986
5	Doris Mills	1986–1987†
6	David Watt	1987–1989

== See also ==
- Mayoral elections in Tawa
