= Arthur Myers =

New Zealand politician, and rugby league administrator (1868–1926)

The Honourable Sir Arthur Myers
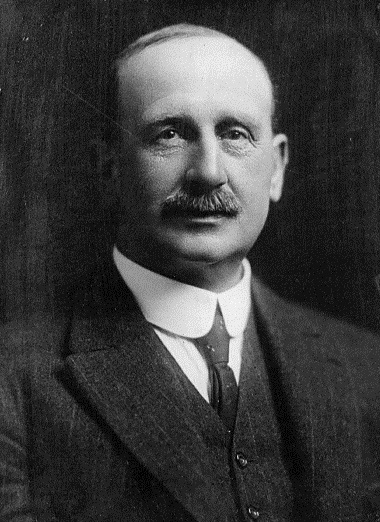

20th Minister of Finance
- In office 28 March 1912 – 10 July 1912
- Prime Minister: Thomas Mackenzie
- Preceded by: Joseph Ward
- Succeeded by: James Allen

Member of the New Zealand Parliament for Auckland East
- In office 16 June 1910 – 3 October 1921
- Preceded by: Frederick Baume
- Succeeded by: Clutha Mackenzie

20th Mayor of Auckland City
- In office 3 May 1905 – 25 February 1909
- Preceded by: Edwin Mitchelson
- Succeeded by: Charles Grey

Personal details
- Born: 19 May 1868 Ballarat, Victoria, Australia
- Died: 9 October 1926 (aged 58) London, England
- Party: Liberal

Sir Arthur Mielziner Myers (19 May 1868 – 9 October 1926) was a New Zealand politician. He was Mayor of Auckland City from 1905 to 1909, Member of the House of Representatives from 1910 to 1921, and a Cabinet Minister. Today he is remembered mainly for the public works constructed in Auckland during his term as Mayor, and partly from his donations, including Grafton Bridge and Myers Park.

== Early life ==
Myers was born in Ballarat, Victoria, Australia, the child of Louis Myers and Catherine Ehrenfried. Both were German Jewish immigrants to Australia, with Ehrenfried's brothers moving with her for the Gold Rush, and Myers to become a trader and pawnbroker. Following the death of his father in 1870, his mother moved to Wellington, New Zealand. Myers went to Wellington College from 1880 to 1883. His main sporting interests were rowing and swimming. The family moved to Auckland in 1886, where his uncle, Louis Ehrenfried had moved the family brewing business from Thames. Later, in 1897, the successful brewery was combined with that of Logan Campbell to form Campbell and Ehrenfried. An able administrator and already something of a financial wizard at the age of 30, Myers became managing director of the merged company following the death of his uncle in 1897.

In 1903 Myers journeyed to London to marry Vera Anita Levy who he had met two years before. She was the daughter of Benjamin Levy, one of the owners of a large British business empire with interests in Australia. Married in London, they returned to New Zealand, where his wife became a well-known hostess and patron of the local cultural scene. It was she who encouraged Myers to eventually run for public office.

== Public life ==
New Zealand Parliament
Years	Term	Electorate	Party
1910–1911	17th	Auckland East	Independent Liberal
1911–1914	18th	Auckland East	Liberal
1914–1919	19th	Auckland East	Liberal
1919–1921	20th	Auckland East	Liberal

Myers ran for and succeeded in becoming Mayor of Auckland City for the term 1905 to 1909. He improved the finances of the city administration, improved services such as the water supply and drainage. The construction of the new Auckland Town Hall was largely due to his efforts, as was the new Grafton Bridge across Grafton Gully. Myers Park, located between Karangahape Road and Mayoral Drive, is named after him, as in 1913 he donated £10,000 to develop the previously overgrown gully into a child-friendly park and to build the adjacent 'Myers Free Kindergarten' (still operating in the same heritage building). One of his few major failures was an unsuccessful attempt to reduce the plethora of local Councils then governing the Auckland isthmus. Nevertheless, he had become known as a popular and effective politician.

Active in the volunteer defence movement, he served as major in the 1st Battalion Auckland Infantry Volunteers and as commanding officer, with the rank of lieutenant colonel, of the New Zealand Forces Motor Service Corps.

Myers donated the Myers cup to the new Auckland Rugby League in 1910. It was contested as the top prize in the inaugural 1910 season and again in 1911. In 1914 Myers was elected the Auckland Rugby League president and he served in this role until his death in 1926.

After a break from politics for a world tour, he entered Parliament for the seat of Auckland East in the 1910 by-election, replacing his cousin Frederick Baume and won comfortably. He held his seat until 3 October 1921 when he resigned between general elections, resulting in the 1921 by-election. He was an Independent initially, and from 1911 he stood for the Liberal Party.

In the short-lived Mackenzie Ministry of 28 March to 10 July 1912 he held three important portfolios; Finance, Defence, Railways, also the Tax Department. From 12 August 1915 to 25 August 1919 he served as Minister of Customs and Minister in charge of Munitions and Supplies, Pensions, Advertising and National Provident Fund during the wartime National (coalition) Ministry, where the gained much acclaim for his efficiency and impartiality. In the 1924 New Year Honours, he was appointed a Knight Bachelor, in recognition of his public services.

Deciding to leave politics—as he had no wish for a long period of opposition for his party—he left politics in 1921, and also left New Zealand, as he had promised his wife at the time of their wedding that they would eventually return to London where she had grown up. The departure was seen a great loss by many locals. Active for the National Bank of New Zealand, he otherwise led a semi-retired life and took up golf. He died in London in 1926 due to the effects of a series of heart attacks. He was survived by his children and his wife Vera. His son, Ken Myers, took over the company. A grandson, Douglas Myers, became CEO of Campbell and Ehrenfried in 1965 and later created Lion Nathan.

New Zealand Parliament
Preceded by Frederick Baume	Member of Parliament for Auckland East; 1910–1921	Succeeded by Clutha Mackenzie
Political offices
Preceded by Edwin Mitchelson	Mayor of Auckland City; 1905–1909	Succeeded by Charles Grey
Preceded by John A. Millar	Minister of Railways; 1912	Succeeded by William Herries
