= Electoral history of Arnold Nordmeyer =

Elections featuring New Zealand politician

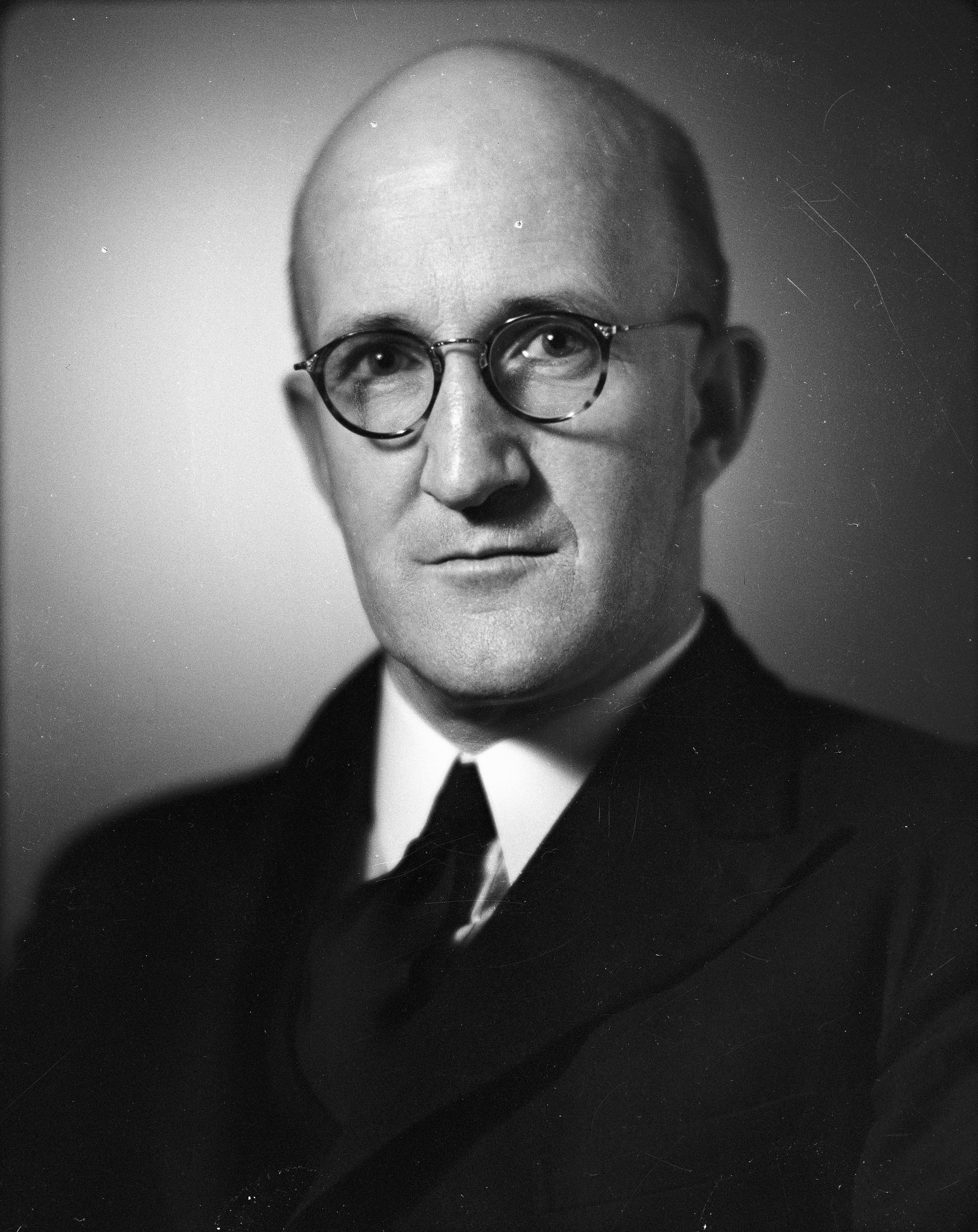
Arnold Nordmeyer in the 1950s.

This is a summary of the electoral history of Arnold Nordmeyer, Leader of the Labour Party (1963–65) and Member of Parliament for Oamaru (1935–49), Brooklyn (1951–54) & Island Bay (1954–69).

== Parliamentary elections ==
=== 1935 election ===
1935 general election: Oamaru
Party	Candidate	Votes	%	±%
Labour	Arnold Nordmeyer	5,296	50.93	
United	Jack MacPherson	4,154	39.94	−1.53
Democrat	Herbert Gladstone Hill	948	9.11	
Informal votes		136	1.30	+0.92
Majority		1,142	10.98	
Turnout		10,398	92.36	+3.84
Registered electors		11,257		

=== 1938 election ===
1938 general election: Oamaru
Party	Candidate	Votes	%	±%
Labour	Arnold Nordmeyer	5,971	53.07	+3.14
National	Frank Cooney	5,213	46.33	
Informal votes		66	0.58	−0.72
Majority		758	6.73	−4.25
Turnout		11,250	95.33	+2.97
Registered electors		11,801		

=== 1943 election ===
1943 general election: Oamaru
Party	Candidate	Votes	%	±%
Labour	Arnold Nordmeyer	5,151	47.81	−5.26
National	Thomas Ross Beatty	5,026	46.65	
Democratic Labour	George Barclay	339	3.14	
People's Movement	George Percival Cuttriss	167	1.55	
Informal votes		90	0.83	+0.25
Majority		125	1.16	−5.57
Turnout		10,773	96.67	+1.34
Registered electors		11,143		

=== 1946 election ===
1946 general election: Oamaru
Party	Candidate	Votes	%	±%
Labour	Arnold Nordmeyer	7,079	50.6	+2.8
National	Thomas Ross Beatty	6,847	49.0	+2.4
Independent Liberal	George Percival Cuttriss	56	0.4	−1.51
Informal votes		53	0.3	−0.5
Majority		232	1.6	+0.5
Turnout		14,035	94.8	−1.8
Registered electors		14,736		

=== 1949 election ===
1949 general election: Oamaru
Party	Candidate	Votes	%	±%
National	Thomas Hayman	7,415	54.6	
Labour	Arnold Nordmeyer	6,721	45.4	−3.1
Informal votes		64	0.4	+0.1
Majority		694	5.0	
Turnout		14,950	95.0	+0.2
Registered electors		15,658		

=== 1951 by-election ===
1951 Brooklyn by-election
Party	Candidate	Votes	%	±%
Labour	Arnold Nordmeyer	5,287	63.56	
National	Len Jacobsen	2,902	34.88	
Communist	Connie Birchfield	129	1.55	−0.59
Majority		2,385	28.67	
Turnout		8,318	63.60	−22.13
Registered electors		13,077		
Labour hold		Swing		

=== 1951 election ===
1951 general election: Brooklyn
Party	Candidate	Votes	%	±%
Labour	Arnold Nordmeyer	6,375	58.35	−5.21
National	Charles William Clift	4,549	41.64	
Majority		1,826	16.71	−11.96
Turnout		10,924	83.53	+19.93
Registered electors		13,077		

=== 1954 election ===
1954 general election: Island Bay
Party	Candidate	Votes	%	±%
Labour	Arnold Nordmeyer	8,594	58.48	
National	John Maurice Whitta	5,159	35.10	
Social Credit	Daniel Gardiner	821	5.58	
Communist	Ron Smith	120	0.81	
Majority		3,824	26.02	
Turnout		14,694	87.29	−1.37
Registered electors		16,833		

=== 1957 election ===
1957 general election: Island Bay
Party	Candidate	Votes	%	±%
Labour	Arnold Nordmeyer	9,368	61.16	+2.68
National	Saul Goldsmith	5,159	33.68	
Social Credit	Eric Elliott	683	4.45	
Communist	Ray Nunes	105	0.68	
Majority		4,209	27.48	+1.46
Turnout		15,315	91.20	+3.91
Registered electors		16,792		

=== 1960 election ===
1960 general election: Island Bay
Party	Candidate	Votes	%	±%
Labour	Arnold Nordmeyer	7,459	53.26	−7.90
National	Fairlie Curry	5,668	40.47	
Social Credit	John Albert Cameron	748	5.34	
Communist	Ron Smith	128	0.91	
Majority		1,791	12.79	−14.69
Turnout		14,003	85.96	−5.24
Registered electors		16,290		

=== 1963 election ===
1963 general election: Island Bay
Party	Candidate	Votes	%	±%
Labour	Arnold Nordmeyer	8,372	54.96	+1.70
National	Fairlie Curry	5,984	39.28	−1.19
Social Credit	John Albert Cameron	711	4.66	−0.68
Communist	Ron Smith	164	1.07	+0.16
Majority		2,388	15.67	+2.88
Turnout		15,231	87.43	+1.47
Registered electors		17,419		

=== 1966 election ===
1966 general election: Island Bay
Party	Candidate	Votes	%	±%
Labour	Arnold Nordmeyer	7,267	53.71	−1.25
National	Saul Goldsmith	4,461	32.97	
Social Credit	K A Marshall	1,487	10.99	
Democratic	John Albert Cameron	174	1.28	−3.38
Communist	Ron Smith	139	1.02	−0.05
Majority		2,806	20.74	+5.07
Turnout		13,528	78.89	−8.54
Registered electors		17,147		

== Local elections ==
=== 1971 civic election ===
1971 civic elections: Wellington Hospital Board
Party	Candidate	Votes	%	±%
Labour	Arnold Nordmeyer	22,915	79.31	
Citizens'	Alan Fraser	15,610	54.03	
Citizens'	Phoebe Brown	15,295	52.94	
Citizens'	Malcolm Nicholson	15,247	52.77	
Citizens'	Gilbert McLean	13,645	47.23	
Citizens'	Gerald Bridge	13,530	46.83	
Citizens'	Nancy Horrocks	12,690	43.92	
Labour	Florence Vincent	12,606	43.63	
Labour	Warwick McKean	12,323	42.65	
Labour	June Lewin	11,174	38.67	
Labour	Stan Rodger	9,615	33.28	
Labour	Terrence Hayden	9,575	33.14	
Civic Reform	Catherine Stafford	3,773	13.05	
Civic Reform	Don McMillan	3,562	12.32	
Civic Reform	Colin Percy	1,784	6.17	
Turnout		28,890		

== Leadership elections ==
=== 1954 Leadership election ===
Candidate	Votes	%
Walter Nash	17	56.67
Arnold Nordmeyer	9	30.00
Abstentions	4	13.33
Majority	6	20.00
Turnout	30	—N/a

=== 1963 Leadership election ===
Candidate	Votes	%
Arnold Nordmeyer	34	100.0
Turnout	34	—N/a

=== 1965 Leadership election ===
Candidate	Votes	%
Norman Kirk	25	71.4
Arnold Nordmeyer	10	28.6
Majority	15	42.8
Turnout	35	—N/a

== Party elections ==
=== 1940 Party Conference ===
1940 Presidential election
Candidate	Votes	%
James Roberts	571	58.62%
Gervan McMillan	320	32.85%
Jim Barclay	48	4.92%
Arnold Nordmeyer	35	3.59%

=== 1948 Party Conference ===
1948 Presidential election
Candidate	Votes	%
James Roberts	387	57.76%
Arnold Nordmeyer	252	37.61%
Clyde Carr	14	2.08%
John Mathison	14	2.08%
Informal	3	0.44%

1948 Vice Presidential election
Candidate	Votes	%
Arnold Nordmeyer	368	52.57%
Dick Barter	124	17.71%
Mabel Howard	77	11.00%
Philip Connolly	44	6.28%
Archie Grant	27	3.85%
John Mathison	23	3.28%
Alan Baxter	18	2.57%
Martyn Finlay	15	2.14%
Jim Kent	4	0.57%

=== 1949 Party Conference ===
1949 Presidential election
Candidate	Votes	%
James Roberts	468	64.55%
Arnold Nordmeyer	218	30.06%
Mabel Howard	26	3.58%
John Mathison	13	1.79%

1949 Vice Presidential election
Candidate	Votes	%
Arnold Nordmeyer	475	63.41%
Dick Barter	101	13.48%
Jim Collins	59	7.87%
Philip Connolly	51	6.80%
Martyn Finlay	31	4.13%
Mabel Howard	22	2.93%
Ben Waters	7	0.93%
John Mathison	3	0.40%

=== 1950 Party Conference ===
1950 Presidential election
Candidate	Votes	%
Arnold Nordmeyer	458	60.02%
James Roberts	299	39.18%
George Manning	6	0.78%
