= 1951 New Zealand Labour Party leadership election =

New Zealand party leadership election

← 1940	17 January 1951	1954 →
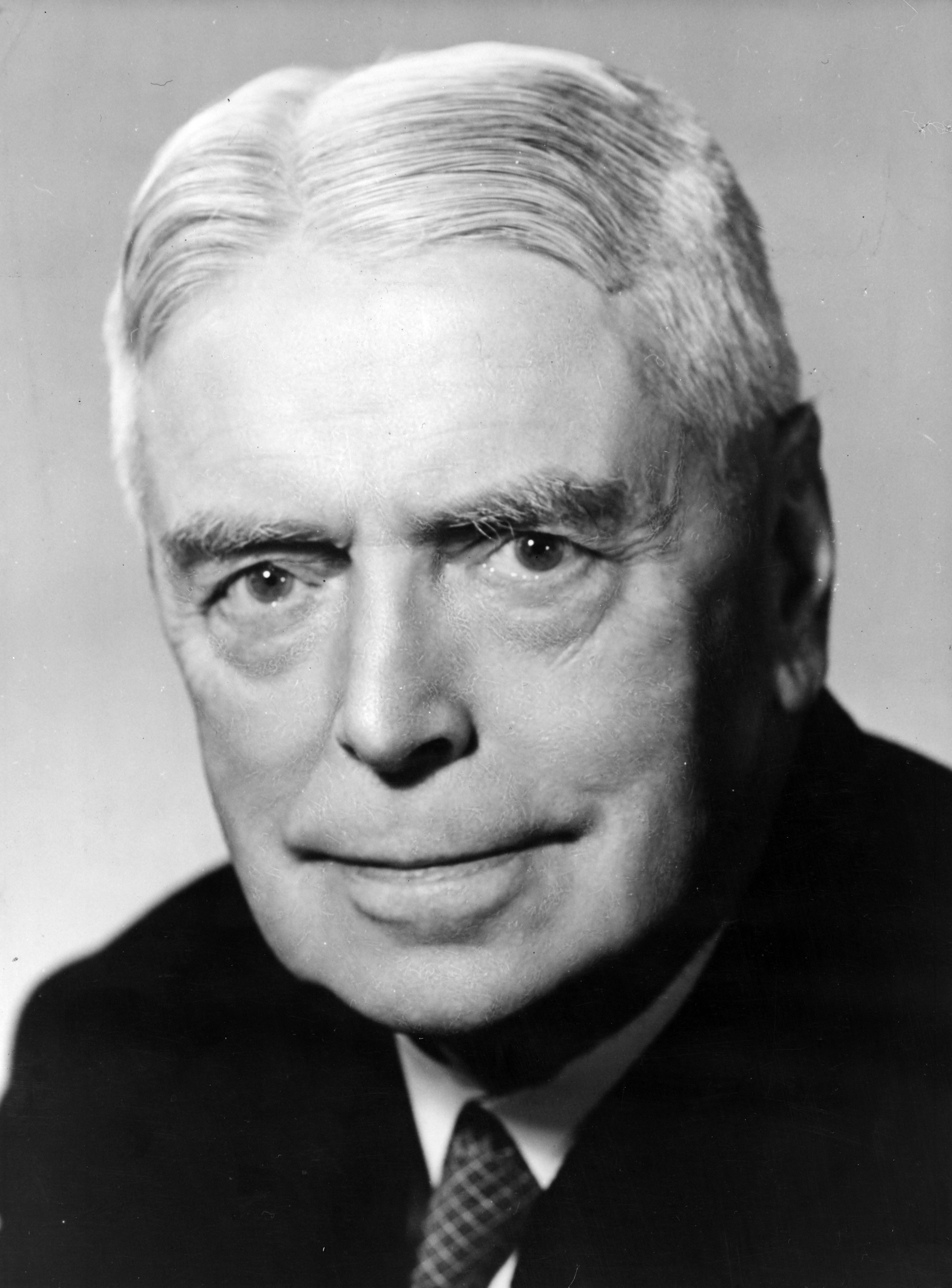
Candidate	Walter Nash
Popular vote	elected unopposed
Leader before election
Peter Fraser
Leader after election
Walter Nash

The 1951 New Zealand Labour Party leadership election was held on 17 January to choose the fifth leader of the New Zealand Labour Party. The election was won by Hutt MP and incumbent deputy-leader Walter Nash.

== Background ==
Labour leader Peter Fraser had led the party since 1940. He led New Zealand through the majority of World War II and retained power in the 1943 and 1946 elections. An ailing Fraser was unable to win the 1949 election and Labour lost power after 14 years in office. Just one year later he died, leading to the position of party leader to become vacant. Deputy Leader of the Opposition Walter Nash had been acting leader since Fraser was taken ill the year earlier and was viewed as an obvious successor.

As the election of Nash to replace Fraser was viewed as an inevitability, most speculation at the time was concentrated on the deputy leadership and the imminent by-election for Fraser's seat of Brooklyn. Both of these questions revolved around former cabinet minister Arnold Nordmeyer (seen as a viable contender for both positions) but had lost his seat in the 1949 election. As acting leader, Nash brought the election of leader to before the by-election meaning Nordmeyer was unable to contest either position as only elected members of the caucus were eligible to stand. There was also suggestions that the deputy leadership should be left vacant until after the by-election.

== Candidates ==
=== Walter Nash ===
Nash had served as a Member of Parliament since 1929. Most saw Nash, Fraser's deputy, as the most logical, or even inevitable, successor as leader.

=== Jerry Skinner ===
Jerry Skinner was seen by many as Labour's rising star. However, despite speculation that he may seek leadership, but was dismissed as mere media gossip. Skinner ruled himself out in favour of Nash, which was then seconded by Angus McLagan.

=== Arnold Nordmeyer ===
Arnold Nordmeyer was also seen as a contender for future leadership, but lost his seat in Parliament in 1949. When Fraser died in December 1950 Nordmeyer was selected to stand for Labour in the by-election for Fraser's seat. The date set by caucus for the leadership election was scheduled before Nordmeyer could re-enter Parliament. The haste taken was an indication that Nordmeyer was considered a threat to Nash and his supporters. According to Warren Freer Nash as acting leader brought the selection forward to 17 January, causing quite an argument in caucus, although caucus eventually voted by a majority of two to proceed with the early vote.

== Result ==
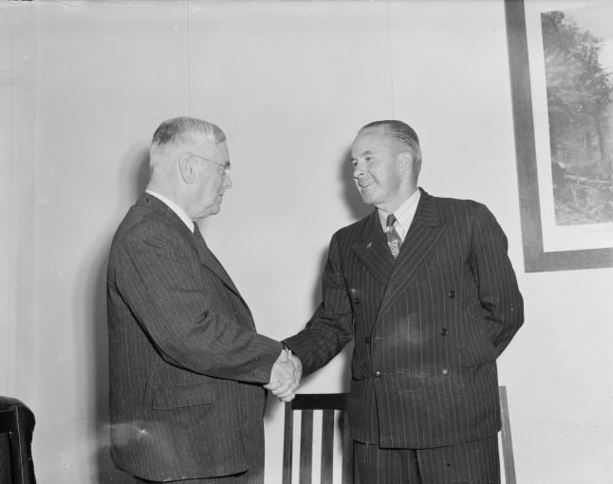
Nash and Skinner congratulating each other.

As Nash was the only officially nominated candidate, he was elected unopposed as leader. Jerry Skinner was then elected as Nash's Deputy-leader. The vote for the deputy position was Skinner twenty-two, Terry McCombs seven and Fred Hackett two. Both Angus McLagan and Mick Moohan were likewise nominated to stand for the deputy leadership, but both declined to do so.

=== Deputy-leadership ballot ===
Candidate	Votes	%
Jerry Skinner	22	70.96
Terry McCombs	7	22.58
Fred Hackett	2	6.45
Majority	15	48.38
Turnout	31	—

== Aftermath ==
Nash would remain the Labour Party's leader until his retirement in early 1963. He led them to successive election losses in 1951 and 1954, though led them successfully in 1957. Upon Nash's election acting-Prime Minister Keith Holyoake congratulated him on winning the leadership. Nash's first act as leader was to attend a morning tea function honouring Sir John Anderson, the chairman of the Port of London Authority, who also congratulated Nash.
