= 1963 Labour Party leadership election =

Labour Party leadership elections were held in the following countries in 1963:

- 1963 Labour Party leadership election (UK)
- 1963 New Zealand Labour Party leadership election
