= Alice May Parkinson =

New Zealand murderer (1889–1949)

Alice May Parkinson (29 December 1889 – 21 July 1949) was a New Zealand murderer. Her subsequent trial and conviction became a subject of contemporary controversy for New Zealand socialist and feminist campaigners due to the perceived severity of her sentence compared to male criminals.

== Early life: 1889–1915 ==
Parkinson was born in Hampden, Hawke's Bay, New Zealand, in 1889. She was one of 12 children of George Parkinson, a farm labourer and Isabella Beazley. Her parents belonged to the Salvation Army of New Zealand. She left home at fourteen years of age (1903) and undertook a period of initial domestic service in Hastings in the Hawkes Bay area of New Zealand, until she moved to Napier and later became a pantrymaid at the Masonic and General Hotels in that same city, in 1909. At that time, she became involved with Walter Albert West, a railway worker, and had a relationship with him, which lasted for six years. Parkinson became pregnant in 1914 but produced a stillbirth on 1 January 1915.

== Manslaughter and trial (1915) ==
Although Walter West had initially promised to wed Parkinson, he ultimately broke that promise. In March 1915, she travelled to Nelson Crescent in Napier, and shot him in the head and chest, thereafter trying to kill herself through a bullet wound to her temple. She was convicted of manslaughter due to the perceived provocation involved and Chief Justice Stout sentenced her to life imprisonment and hard labour at Christchurch's Addington Prison.

== Imprisonment, release and death (1915–1921, 1949) ==
However, her conviction and imprisonment did not prevent the emergence of a widespread leniency campaign. The writer and penal reformer Blanche Baughan regularly visited Parkinson from about 1917 onwards and campaigned for her welfare and release. Harry Holland and his Social Democrat Party (New Zealand), as well as the New Zealand Truth newspaper all campaigned for her early release. The Release Alice Parkinson campaign rallies were well attended publicly. Socialist and feminist organisations also mobilised and Parkinson was released in 1921, into the custody of her widowed mother in Tinokino. Thereafter, she married Charles O'Loughlin, a carpenter in 1924. They had several children together and O'Loughlin died in 1942. On 21 July 1949, Parkinson died.

== Significance ==
Parkinson's trial and circumstances were used by the New Zealand Women's Christian Temperance Union and other feminist and socialist supporters to criticise what they saw as the disproportionate punishment of female offenders compared to their male counterparts, such as convicted paedophiles. Parkinson's supporters took the opportunity to call for female entry to professional occupations like the New Zealand Police, judiciary, jury trial composition reform, prison service and parliamentary representation. At a time when illegitimacy and extramarital pregnancy were stigmatised, Parkinson's pregnancy and nonmarital sexuality had stigmatised her, and was held to explain her response to West's refusal to marry the aggrieved woman. Her subsequent unemployment and indebtedness also affected public perceptions in her favour.
