= Blanche Baughan =

Poet, writer, penal reformer

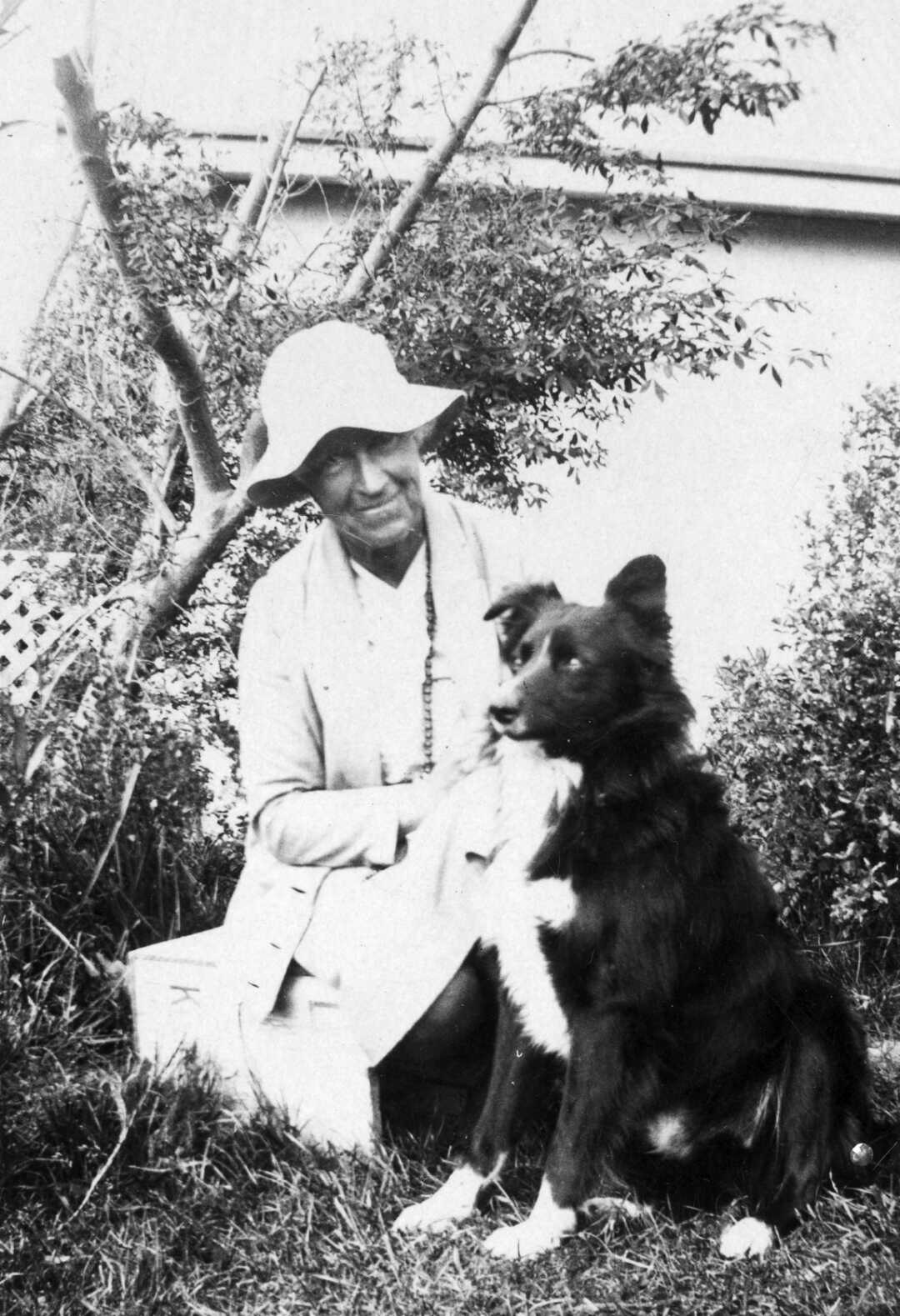
- Baughan with her dog in 1935
- Born: Blanche Edith Baughan; 16 January 1870; Putney, England
- Died: 20 August 1958 (aged 88); Christchurch, New Zealand
- Education: Royal Holloway College
- Occupations: Poet, travel writer, naturalist and prison reformer
- Writing career
- Genres: Poetry, travel literature

Blanche Edith Baughan (16 January 1870 – 20 August 1958) was a New Zealand poet, writer, botanist and penal reformer.

== Early life and education ==
Baughan was born in Putney, Surrey, England, on 16 January 1870, one of six children of John Baughan and Ruth Baughan (née Catterns). Baughan attended Brighton High School for Girls. In 1887 she began her studies at Royal Holloway College; she was one of 15 students who won an entrance scholarship of £50 a year. She studied for a London University degree graduating in 1891 with a BA Class 1 Honours in classics; it was the first First Class Honours degree awarded to Royal Holloway College and Baughan was one of the first women to attend the college.

== Family ==
Baughan’s mother Ruth was mentally ill and in 1878 Ruth and John divorced after living apart for two years. After the divorce John Baughan moved the family to Brighton where he died in 1880. Ruth lived in several different psychiatric hospitals or with relatives until her death in 1902. Sources about Baughan have conflicting accounts of her family and life during this period: some record Baughan as caring for her mother however Baughan’s biographer Carol Markwell found no record of this. Similarly some sources assert that Ruth murdered John but Markwell’s research found that he died of natural causes.

After John’s death the family of six children continued to live in Montpelier Rd, Brighton with the eldest daughter Kate as head of the household. One of her sisters Minnie worked in the Scottish Women's Hospitals in Serbia during World War I.

== Career ==
=== After graduation ===
After graduation Baughan lived and worked in the Settlement Movement in Shoreditch and Hoxton in the East End of London. There she saw poverty, disease, unsafe working conditions and poor living standards. After this she did private tutoring. She was active in the suffrage movement, having attended Royal Holloway College at the same time as suffragist Emily Davison. In 1894 Baughan visited Quebec and had a brief love affair but she did not progress the relationship; she had vowed not to marry as she thought married women had dull lives and she was concerned that her mother's mental illness might be hereditary. During this time she was writing poetry and her first volume was published in 1898. She also began walking and hiking in the Lake District.

=== Life in New Zealand ===
In December 1899 Baughan left England on the steamship Ruahine arriving in Wellington in 1900. She took up a domestic job in Ormondville. In 1901–02 she travelled around the Pacific Islands and Australia, returning to England in 1902 to attend her sister's wedding; she was in England when her mother died. On her return to New Zealand that year she settled in Chorlton on Banks Peninsula where she became involved with the community. In 1904 she travelled to Africa where she visited the Victoria Falls. She later wrote an article about the Falls in the Lyttelton Times. She made her last visit to England in 1906. In 1910 after some ill health she moved to Clifton in Sumner and finally to Akaroa in 1930. She became part of the literary community making friends with other writers such as Jessie Mackay, Johannes Carl Andersen, James Cowan and the Australian A.G. Stephens. Baughan, Jessie Mackay and another writer Mary Colborne-Veel founded the Canterbury Women's Club in 1913 to learn about topics of interest in the wider world such as social work, education, the arts and current events.

Baughan was a lover of the natural world. She called herself "a nature mystic". With her love of hiking and mountaineering, which had begun in England, she explored many parts of the country, writing about them in her travel essays. She collected plant specimens from the Westland side of the Copland Pass and a species of Ranunculus Ranunculus Baughani was named after her. In 1914, recognising that forest habitats and birds were being threatened, she joined conservationist Harry Ell and botanist Leonard Cockayne as founding members of the New Zealand Forest and Bird Protection Society; the society foundered during World War I but was succeeded by the Forest and Bird Society.

She was interested in spirituality, mysticism and the natural world and immersed herself in Hindu Vedanta philosophy. In 1914–1915 she travelled to America where she was able to visit the Vedanta temple in San Francisco and make contact with some swamis, with whom she later corresponded. With her humanitarian and spiritual beliefs she supported conscientious objection during World War I. Her association with that cause, support for conscientious objector Archibald Baxter and the fact that she spoke German put her under some scrutiny at that time.

In 1936, Baughan was elected unopposed as a member of the Akaroa Borough Council, in a by-election following the resignation of William Hoffman. She was the first woman elected to the council, and stood for office following a dispute with the council over the state of the road outside her house. She did not seek re-election in 1938.

== Death ==
Baughan died in Akaroa in 1958.

== Writing ==
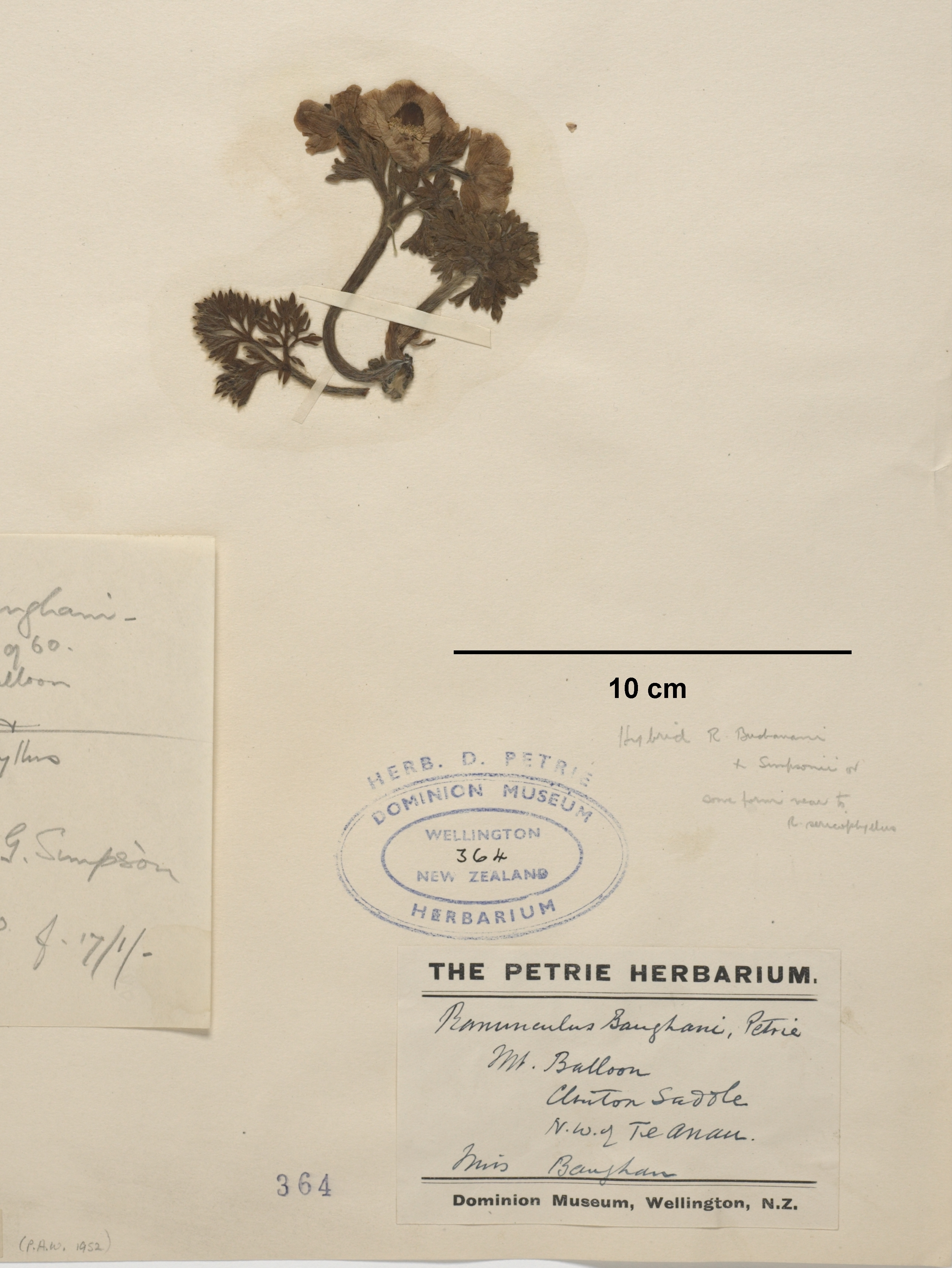
Specimen of Ranunculus Baughani collected by Baughan and identified by Donald Petrie, 1913

Baughan's first volume of poetry, Verses (1898), was published before she arrived in New Zealand. It was well-received by reviewers. Her second volume Reuben and Other Poems was published in 1903, and her third, Shingle-short and Other Verses, was published in 1908. Some of the poems in Reuben and Other Poems were written in England and have English subjects while others were written in New Zealand. Because many publishers were prejudiced against women authors she published under the name B.E. Baughan so as not to reveal her gender. Reviewers of her first three volumes of poetry assumed they were written by a man but her identity was revealed in 1909. In 1912 she published a volume of prose sketches of colonial life, titled Brown Bread from a Colonial Oven. It was Baughan's only published work of fiction and much of it is about life on Banks Peninsula; many of the stories had been previously published in magazines or newspapers. In the years just before World War I she felt her poetry writing talent was diminishing. She published one more book of poetry Poems from the Port Hills in 1923.

Baughan wrote for periodicals in New Zealand, Australia and Britain, including The Spectator which paid her for her essays and poems. As a result of her walking and mountaineering she established herself as travel writer and her article about the Milford Track, "The Finest Walk in the World", was published in The Spectator in 1909. Her first book of essays was published in 1916 and reprinted in 1922 as Glimpses of New Zealand Scenery. Whitcombe and Tombs published a number of her essays as books and booklets including ones on Arthur's Pass and the Otira Gorge in 1925 and on Mt Egmont in 1929.

In the last decades of her life Baughan worked on her only novel Two New Zealand Roses. It was never published and is considered to be strongly autobiographical.

== Prison reform ==
As a result of her spiritual beliefs, being able to live on private means and her experience of social work in London, Baughan was committed to, and campaigned for, civil liberty and prison reform. She was a prison visitor at the Addington Reformatory where she met convicted murderer Alice Parkinson, joining the campaign for Parkinson's welfare and release. To gain an insight into the prison system she also took a job at Point Halswell prison in Wellington. An article in The Spectator prompted her, with her friend Berta Burns, to found the first branch of the Howard League for Penal Reform outside Britain in 1924. She believed in reform not only of prisoners but of prisons and the justice system, called for an end to the death penalty and flogging of prisoners, and offered shelter and assistance to released prisoners. She proposed that prisoners suggest reforms to the system and that psychologists and trained staff be employed in prisons. Using her writing talent Baughan penned many letters and articles in newspapers and gave lectures on prison reform. In 1936, assisted by another penal reformer Frederick de la Mare and printed by Bob Lowry, she published the book People in Prison using the pseudonym 'TIS'. While it was controversial at the time it was far-sighted in advocating for probation, probation officers and treatment of prisoners' alcohol and mental health problems.

== Awards ==
In 1935, she was awarded the King George V Silver Jubilee Medal for her contribution to social services.

== Selected works ==
=== Travel writing ===
- The Victoria Falls (1907) – published in the Lyttleton Times
- The Finest Walk in the World (1909) – first published in The Spectator
- Snow Kings of the Southern Alps (1910)
- Uncanny Country (1911)
- Forest and Ice (1913)
- A River of Pictures and Peace (1913)
- The Summit Road: its scenery, botany and geology (1914) – written with Leonard Cockayne and Robert Speight

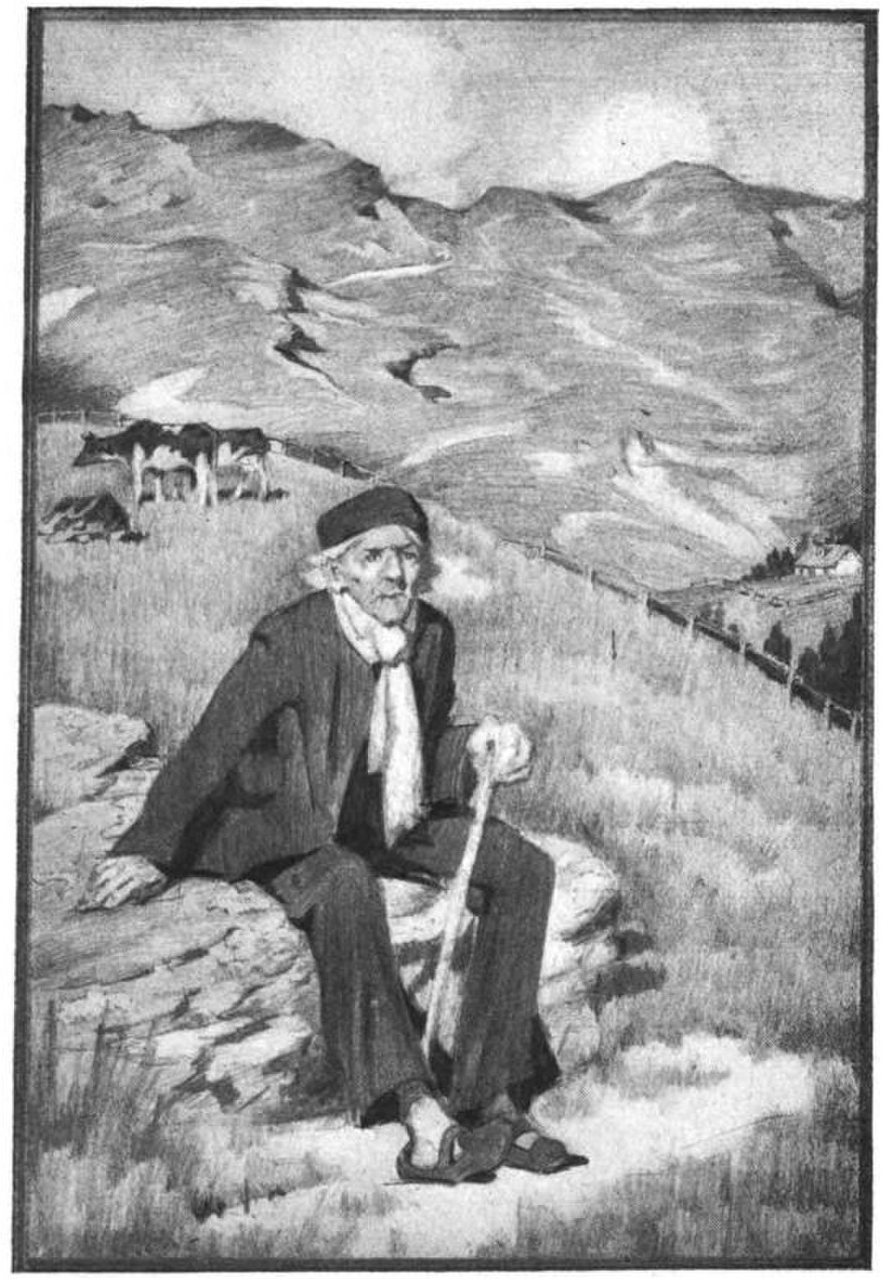
Frontispiece from Brown Bread from a Colonial Oven, illustration by Dagmar Huie

- Studies in New Zealand Scenery (1916)
- Akaroa (1919)
- Glimpses of New Zealand Scenery (1922)
- Arthur's Pass and the Otira Gorge (1925)
- Mt. Egmont (1929)

=== Other non-fiction ===
- People in Prison (1936)

=== Poetry ===
- Baughan, Blanche Edith (1898), Verses (1st ed.), Westminster: Archibald Constable & Co., OCLC 13085408, OL 24173198M, Wikidata Q114873511
- Baughan, Blanche Edith (1903), Reuben and other poems (1st ed.), Westminster: Archibald Constable & Co., OCLC 8492962, OL 21044323M, Wikidata Q113452008
- Baughan, Blanche Edith (1908), Shingle-Short and Other Verses (1st ed.), Christchurch: Whitcombe & Tombs Limited, OCLC 9305049, OL 22893361M, Wikidata Q115662209
- Baughan, Blanche Edith (1923), Poems from the Port Hills (1st ed.), Auckland: Whitcombe & Tombs Limited, OCLC 9864843, OL 43761912M, Wikidata Q114874597

=== Fiction ===
- Baughan, Blanche Edith (1912), Brown Bread from a Colonial Oven: being sketches of up-country life in New Zealand, Illustrator: Frances Dagmar Huie (1st ed.), London: Whitcombe & Tombs Limited, OCLC 18574921, OL 39218202M, Wikidata Q115111271
