= Berta Burns =

New Zealand journalist and political activist

Violet Alberta Jessie "Berta" Burns (12 March 1893 – 26 December 1972) was a New Zealand journalist and political activist. She was born on 12 March 1893.

Burns met the writer Blanche Baughan in 1919 and the two were to remain life-long friends, with shared interests in social work, women's rights and writing. They worked together to set up the first branch of the Howard League for Penal Reform outside Britain in 1924.

She was a member of the National Party and became the chair of the party's Brooklyn branch in 1947. At the 1949 election she was National's candidate in Brooklyn against Labour Prime Minister Peter Fraser, where she raised National's vote but still lost by nearly 3,000 votes. After Fraser died she put herself forward to contest the by-election for the seat, but lost to Len Jacobsen. At the 1951 snap election she stood in the neighbouring Wellington Central seat, where she again finished runner-up. Burns is said to have "waged spirited campaigns in safe Labour seats".
