= Howard League for Penal Reform Canterbury =

New Zealand organisation

- Founded: 1924; 102 years ago
- Type: Lobbying group
- Purpose: Prison reform, criminal justice
- Region served: New Zealand
- Website: https://howardleague.org.nz/

The Howard League for Penal Reform Canterbury is an organisation based in Christchurch, New Zealand, that lobbies for prison reform and works in Canterbury prisons. It is based on the British Howard League for Penal Reform.

== History and purpose ==
The Howard League was formed by Blanche Baughan, Berta Burns and others in 1924, to advocate for criminal justice reform. It was the first League to be set up outside Britain. Baughan noted, in a dictated piece written in the 1950s:

The New Zealand Howard League for Penal Reform was started in 1924 in Christchurch by three people all convinced of the need. One soon resigned, but the others carried on and got information from the Howard League in England.

We began to hold meetings and to be well scoffed at, and badly reported in the newspapers – the name Howard being interpreted as that of E.J. Howard, M.P., a prominent Labourite. By 1928, however, we had managed to get groups interested in other centres and emphasised the fact that the League was for penal reform, and that we were not an 'aftercare society', though the Prisons Board wanted us to be. We affiliated ourselves to the English League and began at last to get sensible notices from the Press.

Teething troubles quickly began and how our baby League managed to weather them I hardly know; but we had a few faithful members and survived a war, a slump, hostility from the authorities, contempt from some of the public and complete indifference from most of it. We went on writing letters to the Press, taught it how to spell the strange words "psychology" and "psychiatry" and gradually convinced people that we were not a set of sentimental softies, but were seriously asking for less mass treatment, more individual attention to prisoners and altogether a more scientific approach to crime and criminals. We also convinced our Courts that compared with figures obtained from England they were too freely sending to Borstal and prison, instead of making proper use of the newer methods of probation of which New Zealand was still very shy. Prison libraries were much improved through our activities, prison concerts and lectures more freely allowed in conjunction with the WEA. We urged the establishment and training of women police, proper understanding and care of the mentally crippled (which we had not yet got) in spite of the 1928 Mental Hospitals Amendment Act, and perhaps most important of all, kept on discovering bit by bit and exposing the pretences and shame that covered much of our real penal system and lulled our people into believing that it was really efficient.

The League has certainly in these ways gradually educated New Zealand towards accepting the much better policy introduced in the last few years by our present Controller General of Prisons and Under Secretary of Justice.

We have always, of course, advocated the abolition of Capital Punishment and it was the League that initiated the success agitation against the hanging of the three Niue Islanders recently convicted.

We have never been very numerous, but we can claim at least to have been faithful to maintaining the continuity of our aims" (cited from upcoming book on NZ Howard League).

In 1928, after more branches were set up around the country the League became a New Zealand wide organisation. The League was active in Christchurch from 1924 to 1974, and over the years a number of people were prominent in the organisation. One involved from the start until his death was Charles (C.R.N.) Mackie, also known for his pacifist work (see citation in Te Ara: The Encyclopedia of New Zealand, that does not mention Mackie's key role in the early years of the Howard League). Later, Lincoln Efford was among the leading lights of the organisation.

The Howard League in Canterbury fronted many attempts to improve the penal system in New Zealand. The anti-flogging, anti-capital punishment stance also included a push towards 'scientific' methods of prison reform, including a rehabilitative approach, psychological assessments of prisoners and humane treatment. After the war, all Howard League branches were involved with ex-conscientious objectors in advertising the conditions in NZ prisons.

== Folding and re-launch ==
Once the hardline Controller of Prisons, Berkeley Dallard, retired in 1951, the prison system began a long process of reform. The Howard League got more voice, and by the 1960s the Canterbury Branch had largely run out of steam, as so many of its proposals were introduced. However, almost as soon as it folded, things started deteriorating again, and the Auckland Branch remained the lone voice for many years.

The Canterbury branch was relaunched by Kathie Dunstall MNZM in February 1998 to work on reform of the penal system and especially to fight against the huge increase in prison numbers. Fact sheets on the prison system and regular newsletters were sent out to a large national mailing list of around 500 names. The Canterbury Branch has, more recently, assisted in setting up new branches in Wellington and Dunedin. As the title 'New Zealand Howard League for Penal Reform' has been taken over by an Auckland group, the new branches have reformed as the National Coalition of Howard Leagues (inc).
