= 1963 New Zealand Labour Party leadership election =

New Zealand party leadership election

- 26 February 1963
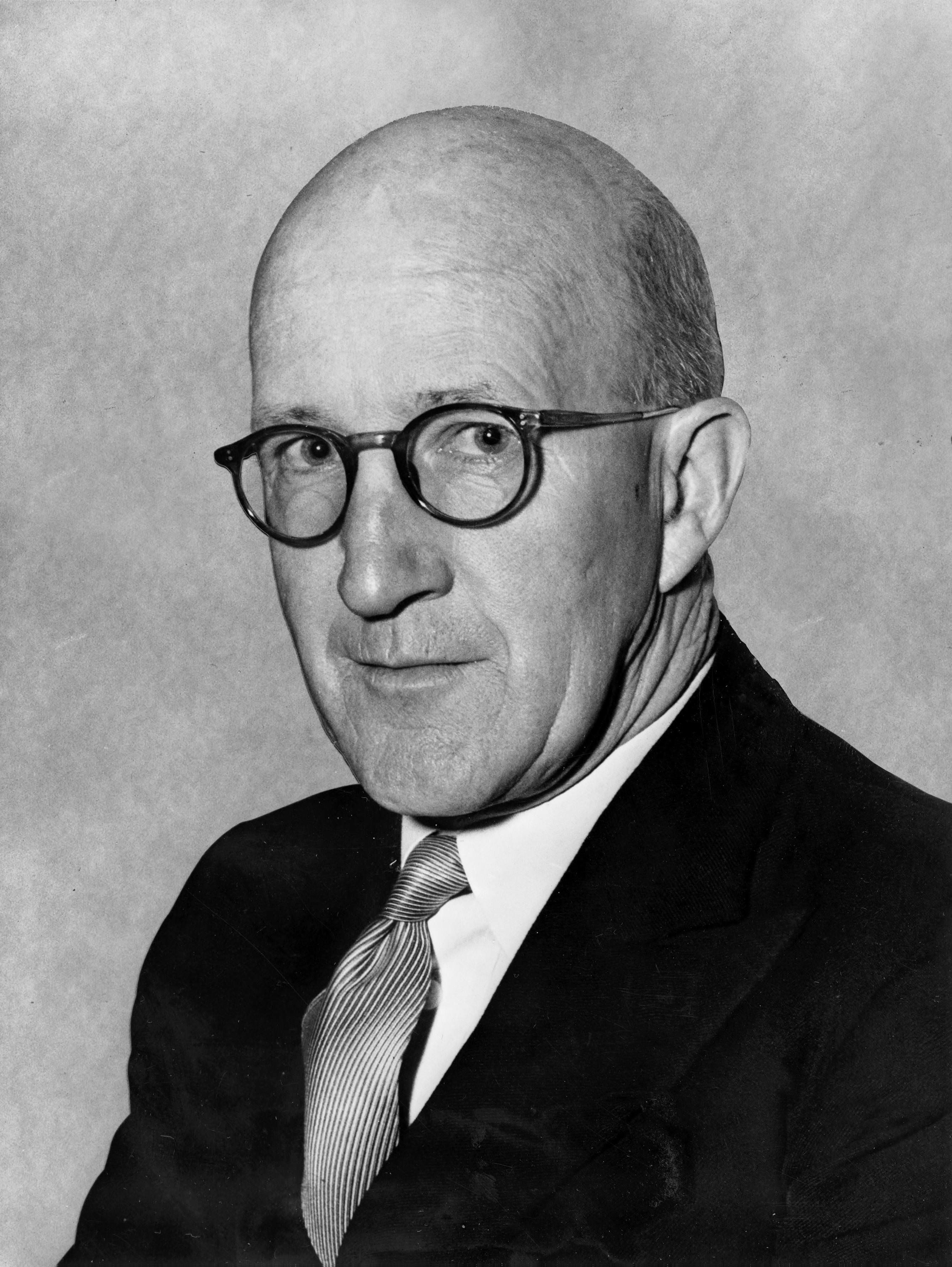
Candidate	Arnold Nordmeyer
Popular vote	elected unopposed
Leader before election
Walter Nash
Leader elect
Arnold Nordmeyer

The 1963 New Zealand Labour Party leadership election was held on 26 February to choose the sixth leader of the New Zealand Labour Party. The election was won by Island Bay MP Arnold Nordmeyer.

This is the first time that a new leader had been elected which wasn't triggered by the death of the previous leader.

== Background ==
Leader Walter Nash had led Labour since 1951 and after his government's defeat in 1960 he defied expectations by not announcing his intention to retire from the leadership. The night of the election he stated he would lead the Labour Party "as long as the Labour Party wants me to lead it" in response to a question from a journalist. Pressure within the Labour Party membership built up for a leadership change, though Nash was reluctant to stand down and was determined not be succeeded by Arnold Nordmeyer. His preferred successor, Jerry Skinner, died in April 1962 though Nash decided still to remain leader for the 1963 election with Fred Hackett elected as his new deputy. By June 1962 Nash told the caucus that he would resign at the end of the year unless caucus requested otherwise. In December 1962 party president Martyn Finlay (who had a strained relationship with Nash) wrote a letter to the caucus recommending a change in leadership, though was careful enough not to specifically suggest a successor. At the beginning of the final caucus meeting of the year Nash told caucus that he would resign at a caucus meeting in February and he would not be a candidate for re-election. In February 1963 Nash finally retired as leader of the Labour Party. Both of Nash's deputy leaders were unable to succeed him, as Hackett was now known to be terminally ill, and other potential leadership contenders Michael Moohan, Norman Kirk and Hugh Watt ruled themselves out.

== Candidates ==
=== Arnold Nordmeyer ===
Arnold Nordmeyer had been a contender for the leadership for many years prior. By 1963 his only convincing rival, Jerry Skinner, had died in April 1962 and Fred Hackett, another contender, was terminally ill. In the previous Labour government he had been Minister of Finance from 1957 to 1960. Nordmeyer, while seen by the press as the likeliest successor to Skinner for the deputy leadership, was defeated in the caucus ballot by Hackett. Despite this earlier defeat, he was once again seen by media as the likely candidate to succeed Nash as leader.

== Result ==
As Nordmeyer was the only officially nominated candidate, he was universally elected as leader. For the deputy leadership, Hugh Watt defeated Norman Kirk in a ballot held at the subsequent caucus meeting. Nash remained leader until 31 March and Nordmeyer took over his roles as party leader and Leader of the Opposition.

=== Deputy-leadership ballot ===
Name	Votes	Percentage
Hugh Watt	17	51.5%
Norman Kirk	16	48.5%

== Aftermath ==
Nordmeyer was the first leader of the party to have been born in New Zealand and one of only a few who had become leader without holding the deputy leadership first. He led Labour to an election loss in 1963 where Labour's vote did increase though only equated to one extra seat. He would remain the Labour Party's leader until 1965 when he was ousted as leader by Norman Kirk.
