= Connie Birchfield =

New Zealand housekeeper, trade unionist, communist, bookseller and activist

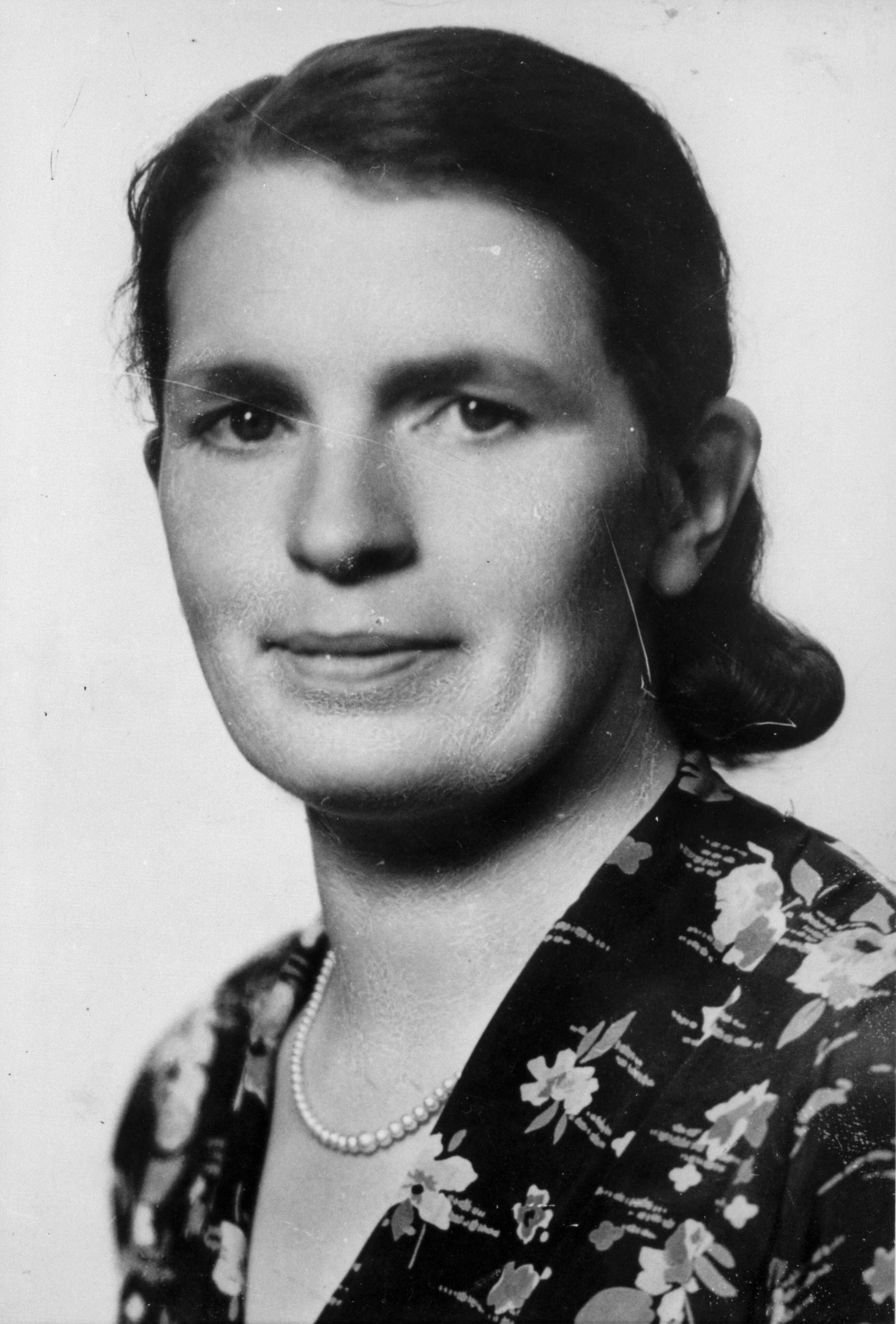
Connie Birchfield in 1943, aged 45.

Constance Alice "Connie" Birchfield (27 July 1898 – 9 May 1994) was a New Zealand housekeeper, trade unionist, hotel maid, communist, bookseller, and political activist. She was born in Haydock, Lancashire, England on 27 July 1898.

Birchfield stood for the House of Representatives four times in safe Labour seats; in general elections for Brooklyn in the 1949 election, for Island Bay in the 1951 election, and for Petone in the 1954 election; and receiving 241, 99, and 120 votes respectively. She also stood for Brooklyn in the 1951 Brooklyn by-election, getting 129 votes.
