= 1951 Brooklyn by-election =

New Zealand by-election

- 17 February 1951
- Turnout: 13,077 (63.60%)
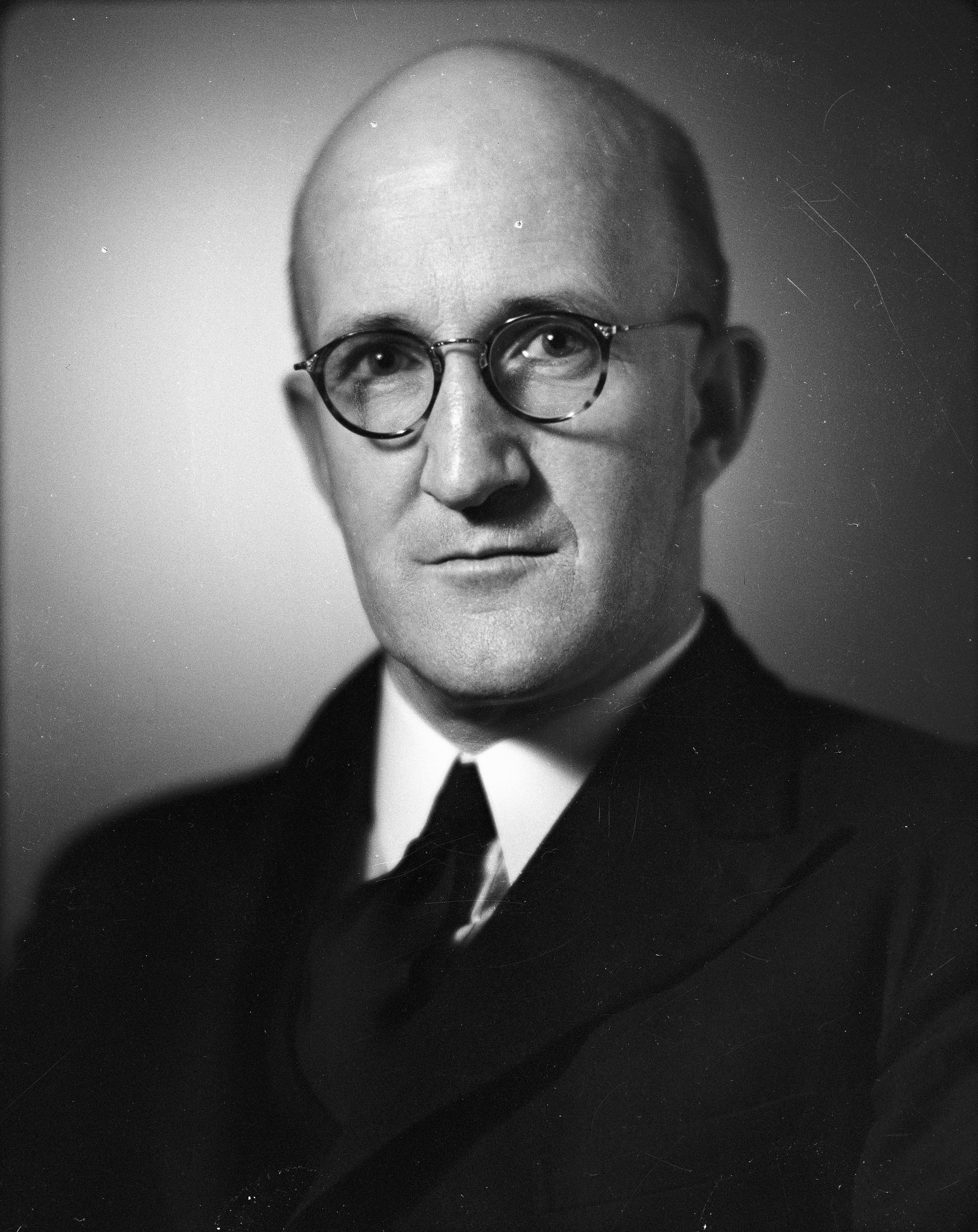

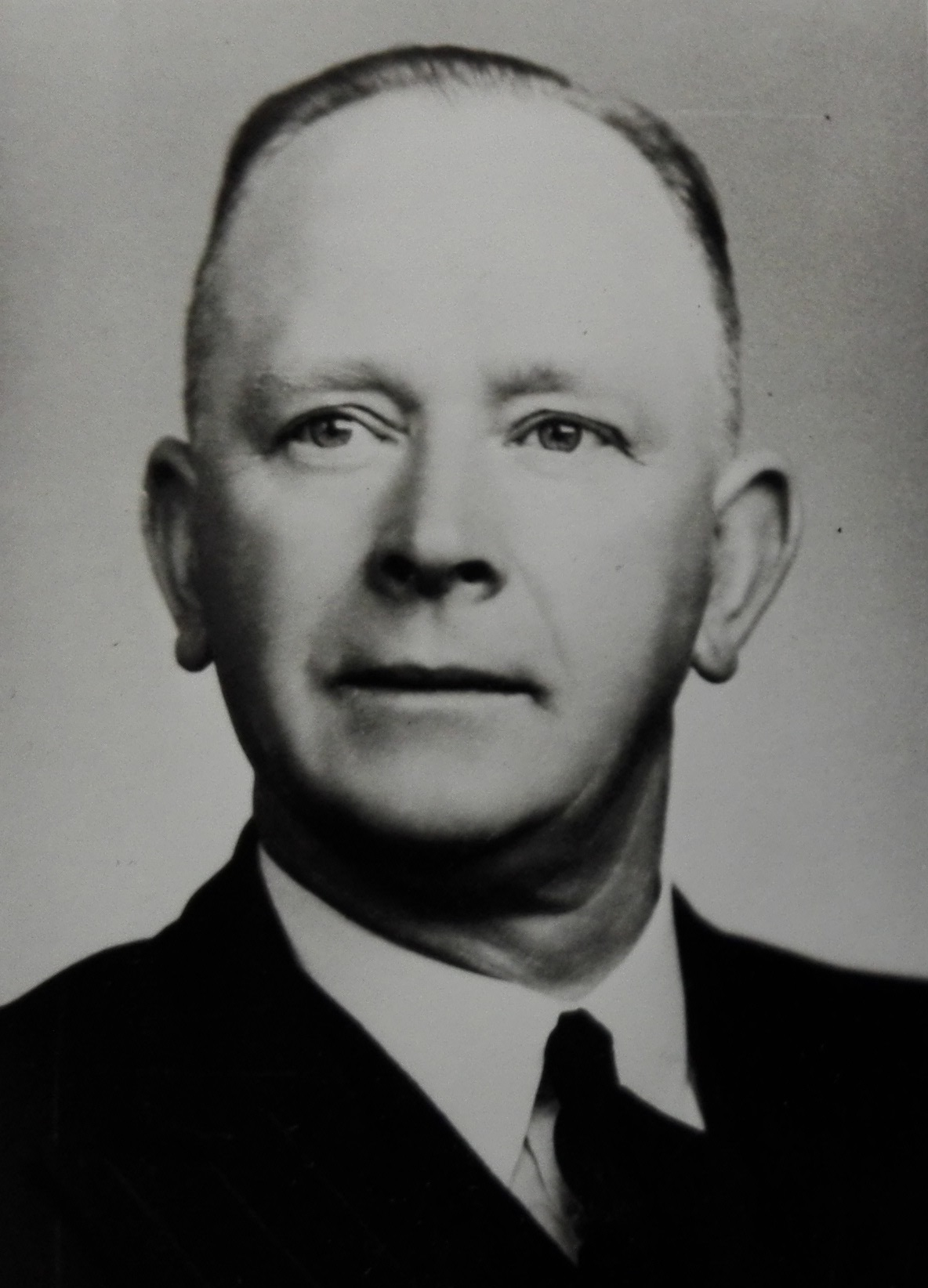
Candidate	Arnold Nordmeyer	Len Jacobsen
Party	Labour	National
Popular vote	5,287	2,902
Percentage	63.56	34.88
Member before election
Peter Fraser
Labour
Elected Member
Arnold Nordmeyer
Labour

The Brooklyn by-election 1951 was a by-election held in the Brooklyn electorate in Wellington during the 29th New Zealand Parliament, on 17 February 1951.

== Background ==
The by-election was caused by the death of incumbent MP Peter Fraser, who had been prime minister until the 1949 general election, on 17 December 1950 after a long illness. Labour's deputy leader, Walter Nash deliberately brought the election of leader to replace Fraser to before the by-election so that if the Labour candidate was successful they would be unable to either participate or contest the position as only elected members of the caucus were eligible to stand. His decision caused a heated debate in caucus, though it was eventually voted for by a caucus majority of two to proceed with the early vote.

== Candidates ==
=== Communist Party ===
The Communist Party (CPNZ) initially offered not to contest the by-election, approaching the Labour Party to withdraw in their favour on condition that Labour adopt several CPNZ policy platforms, notably an immediate withdrawal of New Zealand troops from the Korean War. Labour (who supported the Korean War) rebuffed the offer so the CPNZ ran a candidate. Connie Birchfield, their candidate for Brooklyn in 1949, was selected to stand again.

=== Labour Party ===
Initial speculation was that former cabinet minister and current party president Arnold Nordmeyer, who had lost his seat of Oamaru in 1949, would likely be Labour's candidate. Three other names were also speculated as possible Labour nominees:

- Jim Collins, the vice-president of the Wellington Trades Council and secretary of the Wellington Labour Representation Committee. He had stood as a Labour candidate for the Wellington City Council five times between 1931 and 1941.
- Frank Kitts, a Wellington City Councillor, president of Labour's Wellington Central branch and Labour's mayoral candidate in 1950, who was only narrowly defeated.
- Roy Thomas, the president of the Wellington Labour Representation Committee and former national secretary of the Printing and Related Trades Union.

Nordmeyer was the unanimous choice of the national executive and local selection committee over the other nominations.

=== National Party ===
There were four nominees for the National Party candidacy:

- Berta Burns, a former schoolteacher and journalist who was National's candidate for Brooklyn in 1949.
- Samuel Frickleton, a Victoria Cross recipient from the First World War working as a contact officer at the Rehabilitation Department.
- Leonard Theodore Jacobsen, a local businessman who was a Wellington City Councillor from 1944 until 1950 and National's candidate for Miramar in 1946.
- Elizabeth Reenberg, a nurse who was a Citizens' Association candidate for the Wellington Hospital Board at the 1950 local-body elections.

Jacobsen was chosen after winning a ballot of local party members.

== Results ==
The following table gives the election results:

1951 Brooklyn by-election
Party	Candidate	Votes	%	±%
Labour	Arnold Nordmeyer	5,287	63.56	
National	Len Jacobsen	2,902	34.88	
Communist	Connie Birchfield	129	1.55	−0.59
Majority		2,385	28.67	
Turnout		8,318	63.60	−22.13
Registered electors		13,077		
Labour hold		Swing		

== Outcomes ==
Nordmeyer was elected with a 2.35% swing. While National had won the 1949 election, both the 1950 local body elections and the by-election result pointed to the fact that National's hold on power was tenuous. National's vote fell causing party officials concern over many urban seats which had been won in 1949 only by low majorities. Deputy Prime Minister Keith Holyoake denied that the government's popularity had been impaired and stated that Labour had not offered any worthy suggestions on how the problems of the day could be handled.
