= Brooklyn (New Zealand electorate) =

Brooklyn was a New Zealand parliamentary electorate in Wellington city from 1946 to 1954. It was represented by two prominent members of the Labour Party: Peter Fraser, who was Prime Minister (1940–1949), and Arnold Nordmeyer, who was later Minister of Finance (1957–1960).

== Population centres ==
The 1941 New Zealand census had been postponed due to World War II, so the 1946 electoral redistribution had to take ten years of population growth and movements into account. The North Island gained a further two electorates from the South Island due to faster population growth. The abolition of the country quota through the Electoral Amendment Act, 1945 reduced the number and increased the size of rural electorates. None of the existing electorates remained unchanged, 27 electorates were abolished, eight former electorates were re-established, and 19 electorates were created for the first time, including Brooklyn. The electorate was based on the southern suburbs of Wellington city, around the hill suburb of Brooklyn, as follows:

All that area bounded by a line commencing at a point in the City of Wellington at the junction of The Terrace and Vivian Street; thence along the middle of Vivian Street and its production to a point in line with the middle of the reserve between Cambridge Terrace and Kent Terrace; thence southerly along the middle of that reserve to Ellice Street, and along the middle of Ellice Street, Dufferin Street, and Rugby Street to a point in line with the western boundary of the Government House Grounds; thence to and along the western boundary of the Government House Grounds and the production of that boundary to a point in the middle of Hospital Road; thence along the middle of Hospital Road, Adelaide Road, Riddiford Street, and Hall Street to the middle of the western end of the last-mentioned street; thence along a right line due west to the middle of Hutchison Road; thence along the middle of Hutchison Road, Finnimore Terrace, Dransfield Street, Liardet Street, Short Street, Moffitt Street, Krull Street, Mana Street, Raleigh Street, Veronica Street, Mornington Road, Clarence Street, and Borlase Street, to and across Happy Valley Road, to and along the middle of the road reserve forming the northern boundaries of Lots 17, 13, 9, 5, and 1 of Section 14, Ohiro District, and along the production of that middle-line to a point on the eastern boundary of the Wellington Water-supply Reserve; thence northerly along the eastern boundary of that reserve to its intersection with the south-western boundary of Section 3, Upper Kaiwarra District; thence along a right line to the south-eastern corner of Section 10, Ohiro District; thence along the south-eastern boundary of the Town Belt to a point in line with the middle of Durham Street; thence to and along the middle of Durham Street, Aro Street, St. John Street, Abel Smith Street, and The Terrace to the point of commencement.

The Brooklyn electorate was abolished through the 1952 electoral redistribution, and its area divided between the Wellington Central, Island Bay, and Karori electorates. These changes came into effect through the 1954 election.

== History ==
The electorate existed from 1946 to 1954, but both the MPs who held the seat were prominent in the Labour Party; Peter Fraser, who was Prime Minister of New Zealand from 1940–1949 in the First Labour Government; and after Fraser's death on 12 December 1950 Arnold Nordmeyer, who was later Minister of Finance in the Second Labour Government from 1957–1960, famous for the Black Budget that contributed to Labour's defeat at the 1960 election. In 1954 Nordmeyer moved to the Island Bay electorate.

=== Members of Parliament ===
Key

Labour

Election	Winner
1946 election	Peter Fraser
1949 election	Peter Fraser
1951 by-election	Arnold Nordmeyer
1951 election	Arnold Nordmeyer
(Electorate abolished in 1954; see Island Bay)

== Election results ==
=== 1951 election ===
1951 general election: Brooklyn
Party	Candidate	Votes	%	±%
Labour	Arnold Nordmeyer	6,375	58.35	−5.21
National	Charles William Clift	4,549	41.64	
Majority		1,826	16.71	−11.96
Turnout		10,924	83.53	+19.93
Registered electors		13,077		

=== 1951 by-election ===
1951 Brooklyn by-election
Party	Candidate	Votes	%	±%
Labour	Arnold Nordmeyer	5,287	63.56	
National	Len Jacobsen	2,902	34.88	
Communist	Connie Birchfield	129	1.55	−0.59
Majority		2,385	28.67	
Turnout		8,318	63.60	−22.13
Registered electors		13,077		
Labour hold		Swing		

=== 1949 election ===
1949 general election: Brooklyn
Party	Candidate	Votes	%	±%
Labour	Peter Fraser	7,176	63.91	−1.84
National	Berta Burns	4,220	37.58	
Communist	Connie Birchfield	241	2.14	
Majority		2,956	26.32	−5.16
Turnout		11,228	85.73	−1.36
Registered electors		13,096		

=== 1946 election ===
1946 general election: Brooklyn
Party	Candidate	Votes	%	±%
Labour	Peter Fraser	8,216	65.75	
National	Stewart Hardy	4,281	34.45	
Majority		3,935	31.48	
Turnout		12,497	87.09	
Registered electors		14,349		
