= Arnold Nordmeyer =

New Zealand politician (1901–1989)

The Reverend and Honourable Sir Arnold Nordmeyer ONZ KCMG
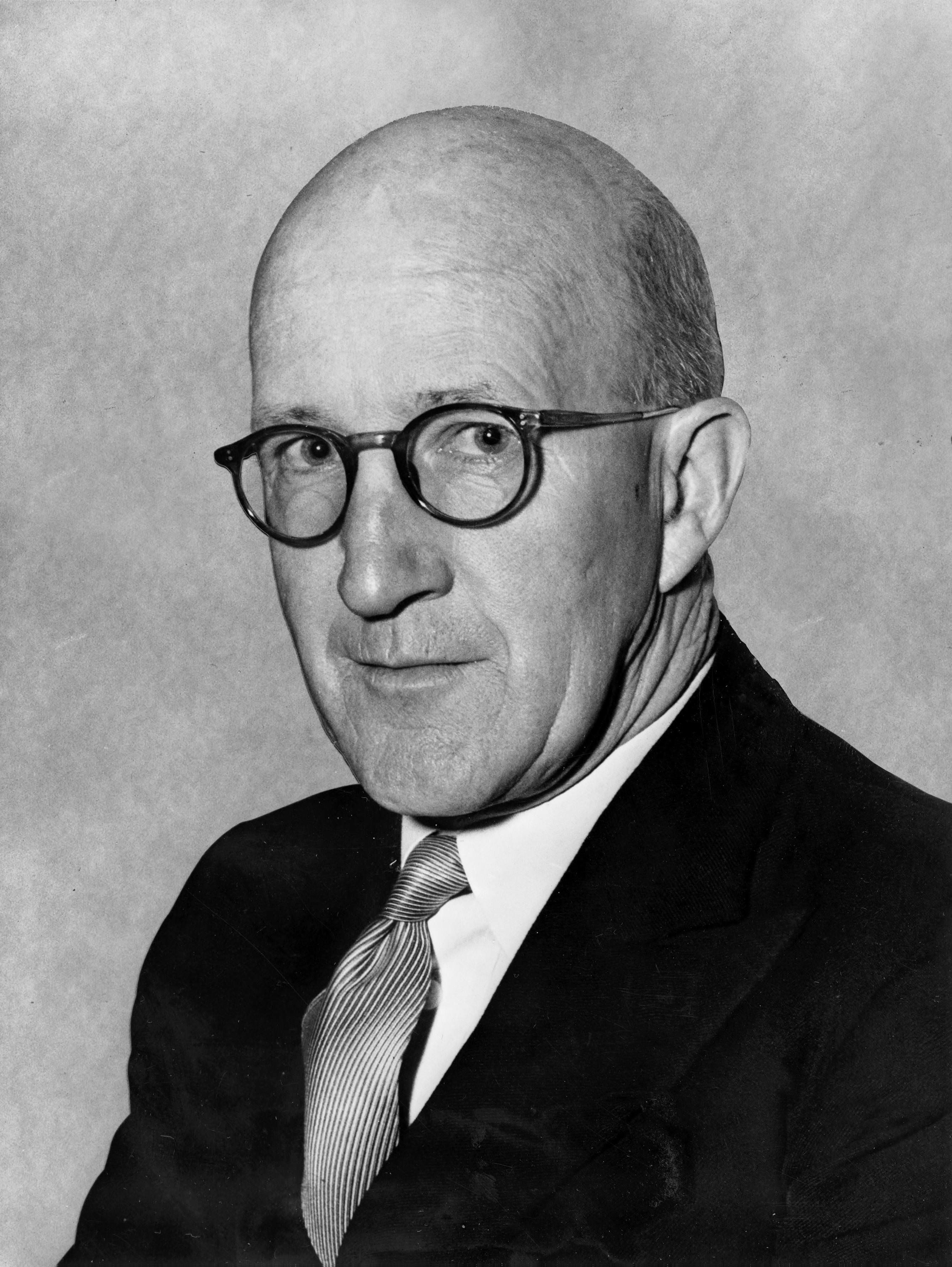
- Nordmeyer in 1954

18th Leader of the Opposition
- In office 1 April 1963 – 16 December 1965
- Prime Minister: Keith Holyoake
- Deputy: Hugh Watt
- Preceded by: Walter Nash
- Succeeded by: Norman Kirk

30th Minister of Finance
- In office 12 December 1957 – 12 December 1960
- Prime Minister: Walter Nash
- Preceded by: Jack Watts
- Succeeded by: Harry Lake

16th Minister of Industries and Commerce
- In office 29 May 1947 – 12 December 1949
- Prime Minister: Peter Fraser
- Preceded by: Dan Sullivan
- Succeeded by: Charles Bowden

13th Minister of Health
- In office 21 January 1941 – 29 May 1947
- Prime Minister: Peter Fraser
- Preceded by: Tim Armstrong
- Succeeded by: Mabel Howard

Member of the New Zealand Parliament for Island Bay
- In office 13 November 1954 – 29 November 1969
- Preceded by: Robert McKeen
- Succeeded by: Gerald O'Brien

Member of the New Zealand Parliament for Brooklyn
- In office 17 February 1951 – 13 November 1954
- Preceded by: Peter Fraser

Member of the New Zealand Parliament for Oamaru
- In office 27 November 1935 – 30 November 1949
- Preceded by: Jack MacPherson
- Succeeded by: Thomas Hayman

Personal details
- Born: 7 February 1901 Dunedin, New Zealand
- Died: 2 February 1989 (aged 87) Wellington, New Zealand
- Party: Labour
- Spouse: Frances Maria Kernahan (married 28 October 1931)
- Children: Two
- Relatives: Jim Edwards (son-in-law)
- Education: University of Otago
- Profession: Presbyterian minister

Sir Arnold Henry Nordmeyer ONZ KCMG (born Heinrich Arnold Nordmeyer, 7 February 1901 – 2 February 1989) was a New Zealand politician and Presbyterian minister. As a member of Parliament (MP) he played a crucial role in the Labour Party, serving from 1935 to 1969. He served as minister of finance (1957–1960) and later as leader of the Labour Party and leader of the Opposition (1963–1965). Although he was a prominent statesman, Nordmeyer never ascended to the role of prime minister.

Despite facing backlash for the 1958 "Black Budget" as finance minister, his political legacy primarily revolves around his economic policies, especially his introduction of New Zealand's comprehensive national health service as minister of health (1941–1947).

== Early life ==
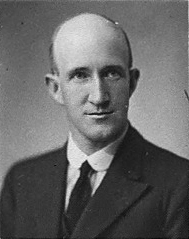
Nordmeyer, c. 1935

Nordmeyer was born on 7 February 1901 in Dunedin, New Zealand. His father was a German immigrant, his mother was from Northern Ireland. He was educated at Waitaki Boys' High School, and at the University of Otago where he completed his BA. After graduating he studied theology, having always been highly religious. At university he became known for his skills in debating which were to serve him well in his later career. Although he did not join the Labour Party until 1933, he became increasingly sympathetic to the party's views. It was at this time that he met Walter Nash who may have been influential in shaping his views in health and social policy. In 1925 Nordmeyer received his ordination as a Presbyterian minister and was appointed to a position in the small town of Kurow.

While in Kurow during the Great Depression, Nordmeyer witnessed firsthand the effects of the economic downturn on the community and people of the town, which lead him to study radical political theory in pursuit of a solution. He also became interested in the welfare of workers involved in the construction of a hydroelectric dam on the Waitaki River. He became increasingly politically active as a result witnessing both the working conditions of the labourers and the poor living conditions of the unemployed men and their families who were attracted to the area by the promise of work. At Kurow, Nordmeyer, along with local doctor and future Labour MP Gervan McMillan and school headmaster Andrew Davidson developed ideas of how to apply Christian ethics to politics to solve the miseries of unemployment, poverty and illness – ideas that were later implemented by the First Labour Government of New Zealand. It was also in Kurow that Nordmeyer met his future wife, Frances Kernahan whom he married in 1931.

== Political career ==
=== Member of Parliament ===
New Zealand Parliament
Years	Term	Electorate	Party
1935–1938	25th	Oamaru	Labour
1938–1943	26th	Oamaru	Labour
1943–1946	27th	Oamaru	Labour
1946–1949	28th	Oamaru	Labour
1951	29th	Brooklyn	Labour
1951–1954	30th	Brooklyn	Labour
1954–1957	31st	Island Bay	Labour
1957–1960	32nd	Island Bay	Labour
1960–1963	33rd	Island Bay	Labour
1963–1966	34th	Island Bay	Labour
1966–1969	35th	Island Bay	Labour

Shortly before the 1935 election Nordmeyer stepped down from his church position, stating an intent to contest the Oamaru seat for the Labour Party. He was elected. The 1935 election itself was a huge victory for Labour and the party's leader, Michael Joseph Savage, became the country's first Labour Prime Minister.

In Parliament Nordmeyer proved to be a skilled debater but also had a somewhat troubled relationship with his party's leadership. Nordmeyer became part of the faction led by John A. Lee who criticised Savage's policies as too moderate. Gradually, however, Nordmeyer became disillusioned with Lee, alleging that Lee was egotistical and self-important. Nordmeyer later co-operated with more moderate politicians such as Walter Nash in drafting the party's social security policies. He chaired both the caucus committee and the parliamentary select committee which considered the matters in more depth. Eventually the committees recommended a scheme containing a means-tested pension, universal superannuation, and free healthcare for hospital treatments, maternity care and general practitioner consultations all to be financed via direct taxation. At Nordmeyer's insistence, the health and pensions schemes would be combined into a single measure which later became the Social Security Act 1938.

After the 1938 election that Labour won resoundingly, tensions between the moderate and extreme wings of the party became worse. Nordmeyer attempted to take a position between both groups but was generally closer to Lee's camp than to the other. The year 1940 saw both the death of Savage and the expulsion from the Labour Party of Lee, a move which Nordmeyer opposed. He was one of the few speakers against the motion to expel Lee at the party conference that year, an action which would in later years give him a reputation for political courage. Nordmeyer nominated Gervan McMillan, an old friend from Kurow and a supporter of Lee, as the party's new leader. McMillan, however, was defeated by Peter Fraser, Savage's chief lieutenant.

=== Cabinet minister ===
In 1941 Nordmeyer became Minister of Health. In this role, which he held until 1947, he was responsible (along with Walter Nash) for introducing state subsidies for doctor's visits. The New Zealand Branch of the British Medical Association had disagreed with the government on the process of free general practitioner consultations where they refused to accept a state fee for their services. Doctors argued that the relationship between themselves and patients was dependent on a direct payment by the patient. A compromise was eventually reached where doctors would continue to charge patients directly after which time patients could then claim a social security rebate. With this initial hurdle overcome, Nordmeyer progressed with the governments agenda over the next six years introducing further benefits for pharmaceutical prescriptions, dental care, hospital outpatients and X-ray diagnosis.

From 1947 to 1949, Nordmeyer was Minister of Industries and Commerce. He was charged with the administration of New Zealand's comprehensive system of import licensing controls and was an advocate for the establishment of new industries and having greater protection for local industries. He also pushed for development policies designed to make New Zealand more economically self-sufficient. By this time he came to be regarded as one of the most senior members of the government.

In the 1949 election, however, Labour was defeated by the National Party under Sidney Holland. Nordmeyer himself lost his seat of Oamaru against Thomas Hayman. In late 1950 Peter Fraser died and Nordmeyer was elected in the 1951 by-election as his replacement in the seat of Brooklyn. In 1954 he won the Island Bay seat, which he held until he retired in 1969.

In the short period between Fraser's death and Nordmeyer's return to Parliament Walter Nash had been hastily elected leader of the Labour Party. The speed of Nash's ascent is sometimes seen as evidence that his supporters considered Nordmeyer a threat. Nordmeyer, although he had worked with Nash before, opposed Nash's appointment as he objected to Nash's leadership style and considered Nash to be both autocratic and uninspiring. In 1954 Nordmeyer began a challenge for the leadership. Although Nordmeyer gained considerable backing from certain sectors of the party, Nash enjoyed strong union support and defeated the challenge in caucus on 23 June 1954.

Following the unsuccessful challenge to Nash, Nordmeyer together with Bill Anderton and Phil Connolly were called before The Labour Party National Executive and given warnings about the threat of divisiveness to the party.

=== Minister of Finance ===
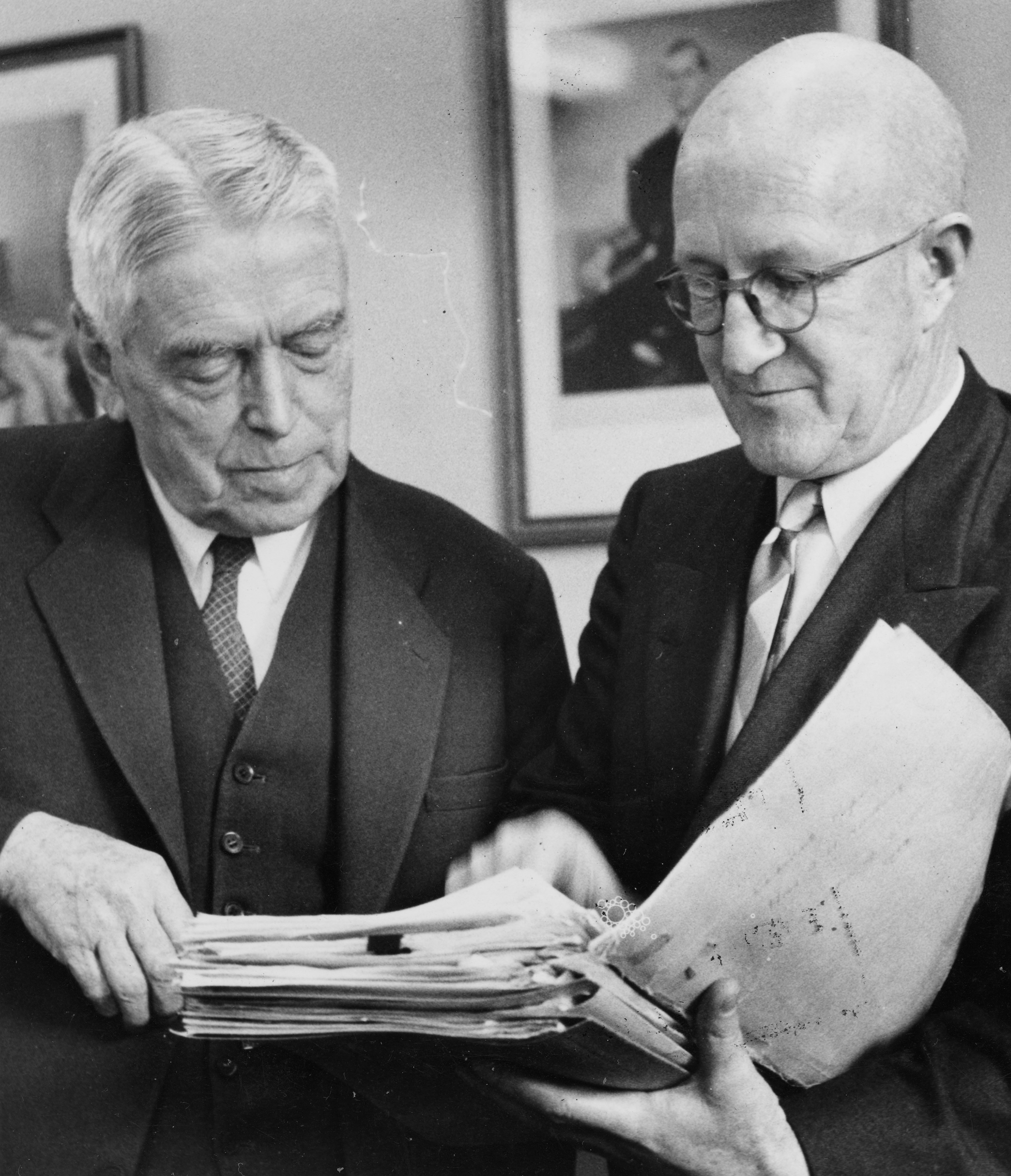
Nash and Nordmeyer in 1958

When Labour won the 1957 election Nordmeyer was made Minister of Finance and was ranked third within the government. A short time after taking office Nordmeyer uncovered that the country was on the brink of a balance of payments crisis and decided to take strong measures in response. His first Budget (generally known as "the Black Budget") introduced a number of unpopular changes, including significant tax increases. The particularly large tax increases for alcohol and tobacco, coupled with Nordmeyer's strong religious background, created the impression that he was attempting to impose puritan-like reforms (Nordmeyer did not drink or smoke). Nordmeyer's idea was that a short sharp corrective budget would fix the economic situation and from then on there would be nothing other than improvement until the next election.

The crisis was largely averted and the balance of payments situation was resolved favourably. As a result, the taxes were reduced in Nordmeyer's next two budgets. However this did not quell the unpopularity of his first budget. Consequently, Labour was duly voted out of office in the 1960 election, something that many historians blame on Nordmeyer's "Black Budget".

=== Leader of the Opposition ===
Despite attracting considerable blame for Labour's loss of support Nordmeyer was elected to lead the Labour Party when Nash retired in 1963. Future interim prime minister Hugh Watt became Nordmeyer's deputy leader. His first test as leader came with a by-election in the normally safe seat of Grey Lynn which Labour managed to retain and slightly increase their majority. This boosted confidence ahead of the 1963 election where Nordmeyer led Labour to slightly increase its vote share and gain one seat from National.

The memory of the "Black Budget" still haunted Nordmeyer's profile, however, and many within the party believed that it was time for "a new generation" to take control. In 1965 a group of Labour MP's formed a group known as the 'Mafia' who were dedicated to replacing Nordmeyer with Norman Kirk. This was due to some within the Labour caucus thinking Nordmeyer "out of touch" with his Members and vice versa, some considering him an autocratic loner, despite his considerable debating abilities. Over time Nordmeyer had drifted to the right of the Labour Party despite being on the left and defending Lee in the 1930s. This caused him to lose support among Labour's more radical members. Even members on the right and those who were more appreciative of his abilities also came to the conclusion that Labour would be unelectable under Nordmeyer's leadership. Kirk eventually emerged as the favourite candidate to succeed Nordmeyer and in a vote on 9 December 1965, Nordmeyer was defeated by 25 votes to 10. His defeat severed a link with Labour's past as Nordmeyer, by then, was alone among his colleagues as having served in the first Labour government's cabinet. Historians regard his replacement with Kirk as transitioning Labour into a new generation.

After his defeat Nordmeyer did not wish for a shadow cabinet position and decided to sit on the backbench, but he did offer himself again as a candidate at the 1966 election. He remained a respected figure in the Labour Party for his experience and service and continued to be regarded by historians as one of the best ministers the Labour Party had produced. A later Deputy Prime Minister of New Zealand quipped about Nordmeyer:

... the best Prime Minister we never had.

— Michael Cullen

== Retirement from politics ==
Nordmeyer remained in Parliament for another four years, retiring at the 1969 election. At the 1971 local-body elections he was elected a member of the Wellington Hospital Board.

Between 1971 and 1974, Nordmeyer served as president of the New Zealand Insurance Workers' Union. Nordmeyer was the first public figure to be elected president, as earlier union leaders had been full-time insurance workers. He was elected president due to the union's desire for someone with more experience in industrial and financial fields.

Nordmeyer later held a number of government appointments after retiring from parliament. In 1970 he was appointed chairman of the Freezing Industry Disputes Committee, an appointment which led to him becoming conciliator in several other industrial areas subsequently. In 1974 he was appointed chairman of the board of the New Zealand Superannuation Corporation which was the controlling organisation for the compulsory pension savings' scheme of the Third Labour Government (led by Kirk). The posting was short-lived however as the subsequent Third National Government were to abolish the commission after winning power the next year. He then became the chairman of Maui Development Ltd and also was a director of the Reserve Bank of New Zealand.

Nordmeyer was one of the staunchest opponents of capital punishment and was also staunchly opposed to abortion, being a patron of New Zealand's main anti-abortion group Society for the Protection of the Unborn Child (SPUC).

Nordmeyer died in Wellington on 2 February 1989, survived by his wife Frances and their two children. His family declined the offer of a state funeral instead opting to scatter his ashes by Lake Ōhau.

== Personal life ==
Nordmeyer married Frances Maria Kernahan in Oamaru on 28 October 1931. The couple had two children, Alan and Alison. Alison married Labour MP Jim Edwards. In the 1989 Queen's Birthday Honours, Lady Nordmeyer was appointed a Companion of the Queen's Service Order for community service. Nordmeyer was a teetotaller and did not smoke.

== Honours and recognition ==
In 1953, Nordmeyer was awarded the Queen Elizabeth II Coronation Medal. In the 1970 Queen's Birthday Honours, he was appointed a Companion of the Order of St Michael and St George, for services to politics. In the 1975 Queen's Birthday Honours, he was promoted to Knight Commander of the Order of St Michael and St George, for public services. On 6 February 1987, Nordmeyer was the fifth appointee to the Order of New Zealand.

== See also ==
- Electoral history of Arnold Nordmeyer – An article about his electoral history.

== Notes ==
New Zealand Parliament
Preceded by Jack MacPherson	Member of Parliament for Oamaru; 1935–1949	Succeeded by Thomas Hayman
Preceded by Peter Fraser	Member of Parliament for Brooklyn; 1951–1954	Constituency abolished
Preceded by Robert McKeen	Member of Parliament for Island Bay; 1954–1969	Succeeded by Gerald O'Brien
Political offices
Preceded by Tim Armstrong	Minister of Health; 1941–1947	Succeeded by Mabel Howard
Preceded by Dan Sullivan	Minister of Industries and Commerce; 1947–1949	Succeeded by Charles Bowden
Preceded by Jack Watts	Minister of Finance; 1957–1960	Succeeded by Harry Lake
Preceded by Walter Nash	Leader of the Opposition; 1963–1965	Succeeded by Norman Kirk
Party political offices
Preceded by James Roberts	President of the Labour Party; 1950–1955	Succeeded by Mick Moohan
Preceded by Walter Nash	Leader of the Labour Party; 1963–1965	Succeeded by Norman Kirk
