= 1954 New Zealand Labour Party leadership election =

New Zealand party leadership election

- 23 June 1954
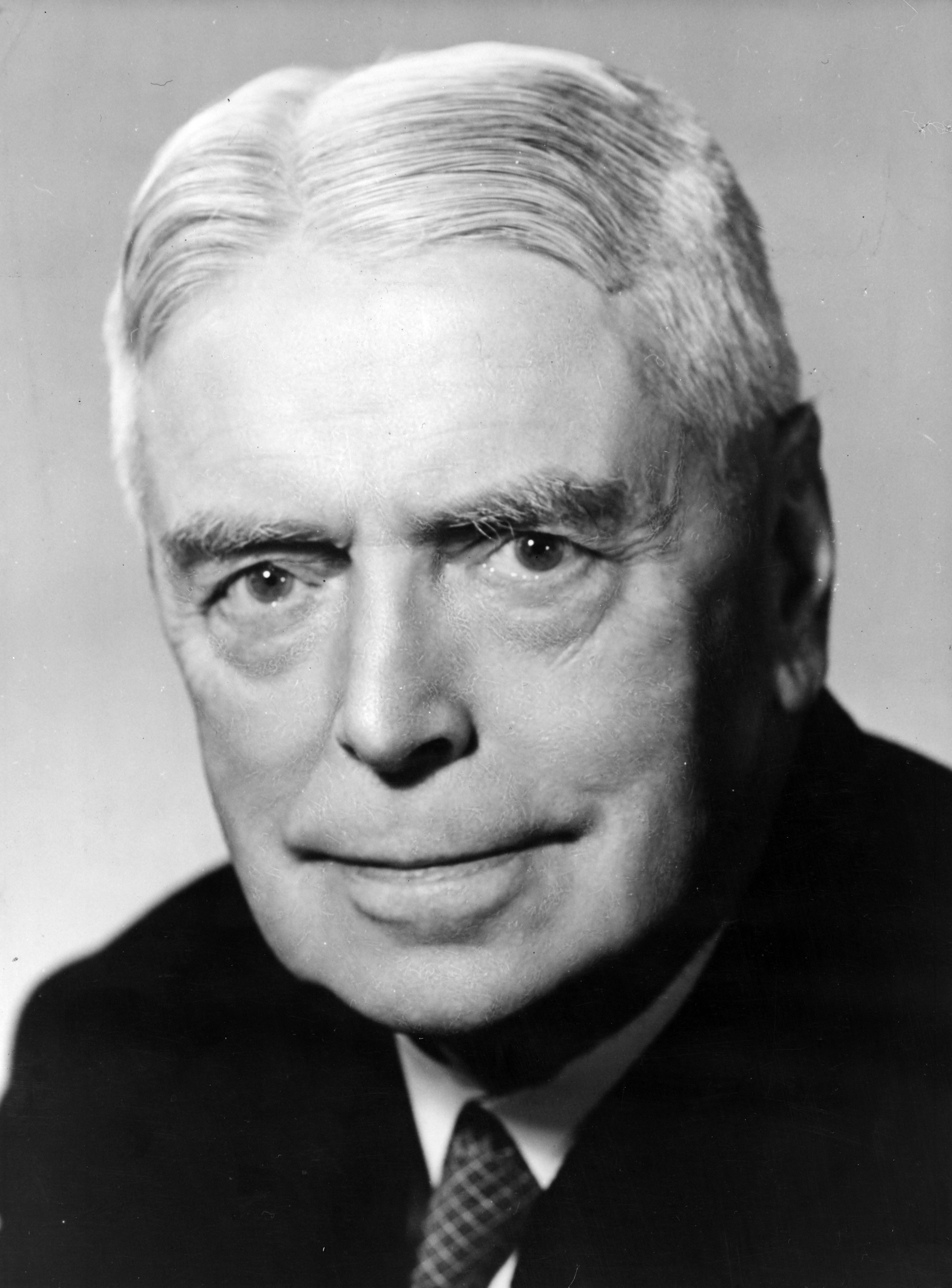

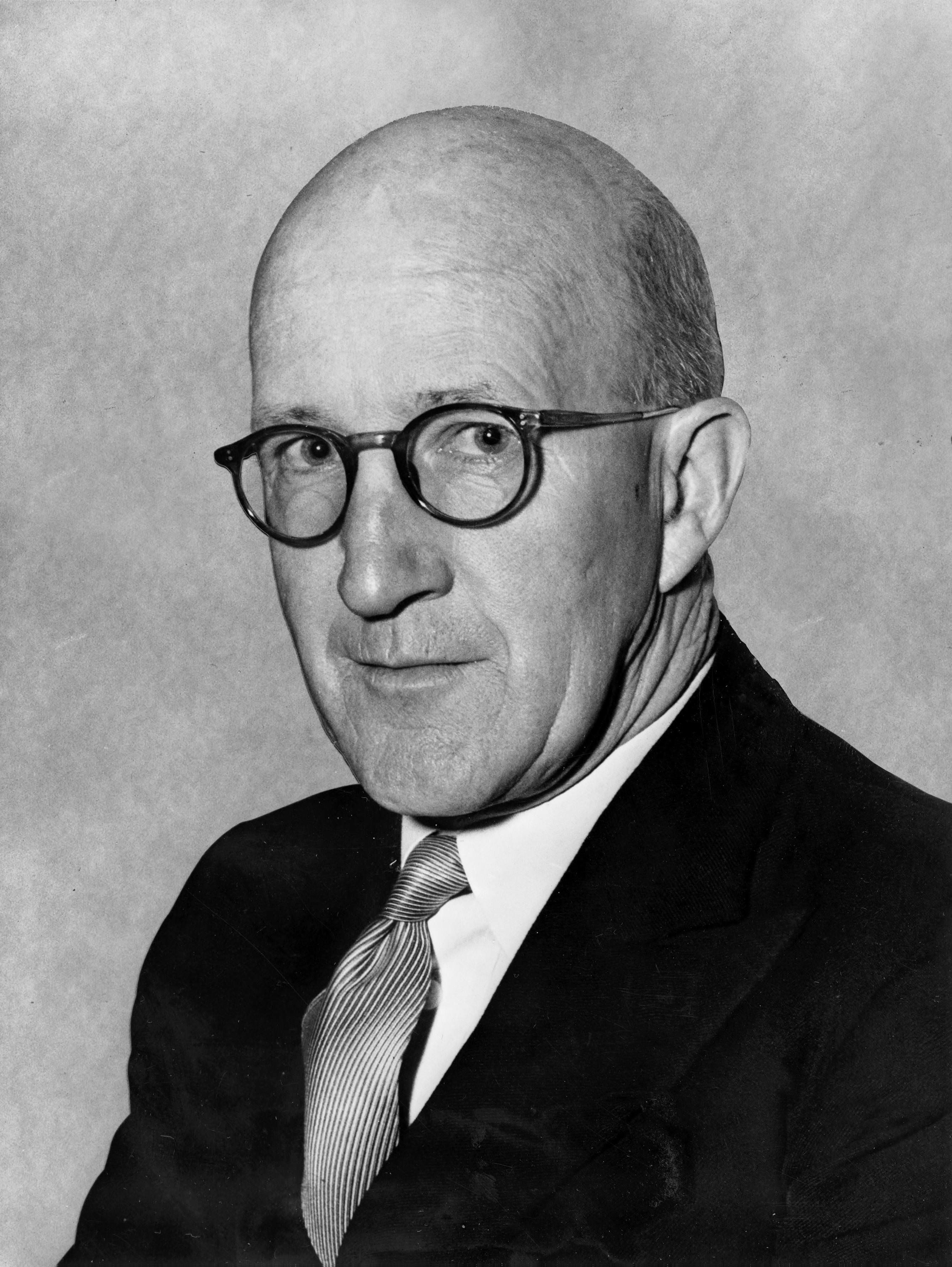
Candidate	Walter Nash	Arnold Nordmeyer
Popular vote	17	9
Percentage	56.66%	30.00%
Leader before election
Walter Nash
Leader after election
Walter Nash

The 1954 New Zealand Labour Party leadership election was held on 23 June 1954 to determine the future leadership of the New Zealand Labour Party. The election was won by Hutt MP Walter Nash, the incumbent leader.

== Background ==
Nash's initial handling of the leadership of the Labour party was seen as rather mediocre. He had difficult obstacles, chiefly the waterfront dispute. Nash attempted to take a moderate position in the dispute, stating "we are not for the waterside workers, and we are not against them". Labour's neutral position merely ended up displeasing both sides, however, and Nash was widely accused of indecision and lack of courage. Labour was defeated heavily in the 1951 snap election.

In May 1953, Rex Mason informed Nash that several members were complaining to him about the party's leadership to him and that he thought that the majority wanted a new leader to take over. Later, in February 1954, MP Angus McLagan referred to a newspaper article questioning Nash's leadership which resulted in a unanimous call for a date to be set for new leadership selection.

== Candidates ==
=== Walter Nash ===
Nash had been Labour's leader since 1951. While his leadership was questioned by caucus colleagues, Nash had overwhelming support from the Trade Unions, who backed the party financially. Likewise, party branches from all over the country passed resolutions confirming their support for Nash, sending a message to prospective challengers. Nash was nominated by Mick Moohan for the leadership.

=== Arnold Nordmeyer ===
Nordmeyer had been an MP since 1935, though briefly out of parliament from 1949 to 1951. He was the then President of the party and it was speculated he may have been involved with leaking the media report quoted by McLagan. Nordmeyer was nominated by Warren Freer for the leadership.

== Result ==
Under pressure from the grass roots members and trade unions, the majority of Labour's caucus voted for Nash. Some, such as Moohan, switched sides and voted for Nash in recognition of the increasing unpopularity of a leadership change. According to Nash himself, only nine votes were cast against him. The four Maori MPs abstained from the vote.

=== Leadership ballot ===
Candidate	Votes	%
Walter Nash	17	56.67
Arnold Nordmeyer	9	30.00
Abstentions	4	13.33
Majority	6	20.00
Turnout	30	—N/a

== How each MP voted ==
A list of each MP's vote.

MP	Leader Vote
Bill Anderton	Nordmeyer
Clyde Carr	Nash
Charles Chapman	Nash
Harry Combs	Nash
Phil Connolly	Nordmeyer
Joe Cotterill	Nash
Warren Freer	Nordmeyer
Fred Hackett	Nordmeyer
Mabel Howard	Nash
Wally Hudson	Nash
Paddy Kearins	Nordmeyer
Jim Kent	Nash
Ritchie Macdonald	Nash
Robert Macfarlane	Nordmeyer
Rex Mason	Nordmeyer
Jock Mathison	Nash
Robert McKeen	Nash
Angus McLagan	Nash
Ethel McMillan	Nash
Mick Moohan	Nash
Walter Nash	Nash
Arnold Nordmeyer	Nordmeyer
Tiaki Omana	Abstain
Tapihana Paraire Paikea	Abstain
Iriaka Ratana	Abstain
Bob Semple	Nash
Jerry Skinner	Nash
John Stewart	Nordmeyer
Eruera Tirikatene	Abstain
Hugh Watt	Nash

== Aftermath ==
The affair was messy and won little support from either public or party. As a result, Nordmeyer, Bill Anderton and Phil Connolly were called before Labour's National Executive. Nash himself was shocked at Nordmeyer's level of support. Nash would remain leader until 1963, when he retired. Nordmeyer took his place as leader, though was only to hold the post for two years. Jerry Skinner remained as deputy-leader, he was re-elected unopposed for the position.
