= Bob Tizard =

New Zealand politician

The Right Honourable Bob Tizard CNZM
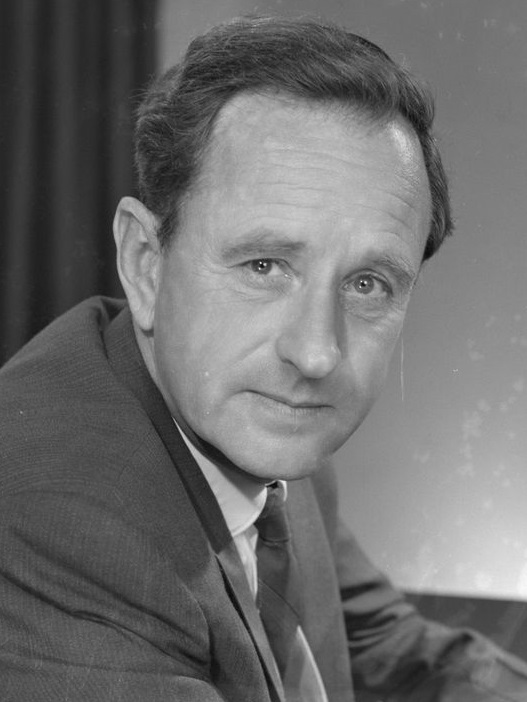
- Tizard in 1968

6th Deputy Prime Minister of New Zealand
- In office 10 September 1974 – 12 December 1975
- Prime Minister: Bill Rowling
- Preceded by: Hugh Watt
- Succeeded by: Brian Talboys

29th Minister of Defence
- In office 24 July 1987 – 9 February 1990
- Prime Minister: David Lange; Geoffrey Palmer
- Preceded by: Frank O'Flynn
- Succeeded by: Peter Tapsell

17th Minister of Science and Technology
- In office 26 July 1984 – 9 February 1990
- Prime Minister: David Lange; Geoffrey Palmer
- Preceded by: Ian Shearer
- Succeeded by: Margaret Austin

5th Minister of Energy
- In office 26 July 1984 – 16 September 1987
- Prime Minister: David Lange
- Preceded by: Bill Birch
- Succeeded by: David Butcher

16th Minister of Statistics
- In office 26 July 1984 – 16 September 1987
- Prime Minister: David Lange
- Preceded by: John Falloon
- Succeeded by: Margaret Shields

34th Minister of Finance
- In office 6 September 1974 – 12 December 1975
- Prime Minister: Bill Rowling
- Preceded by: Bill Rowling
- Succeeded by: Robert Muldoon

22nd Minister of State Services
- In office 8 December 1972 – 10 September 1974
- Prime Minister: Norman Kirk
- Preceded by: Jack Marshall
- Succeeded by: Arthur Faulkner

3rd Minister of Health
- In office 8 December 1972 – 10 September 1974
- Prime Minister: Norman Kirk
- Preceded by: Lance Adams-Schneider
- Succeeded by: Tom McGuigan

Personal details
- Born: Robert James Tizard; 7 June 1924 Auckland, New Zealand
- Died: 28 January 2016 (aged 91) Auckland, New Zealand
- Party: Labour
- Spouses: Catherine Maclean (m. 1951; div. 1980) Mary Nacey (m. 1983, divorced) Beryl Vignale (m. 1989)
- Children: 5; including Judith

Military service
- Branch/service: Royal New Zealand Air Force
- Years of service: 1943–45
- Rank: Flying Officer
- Battles/wars: World War II

Robert James Tizard CNZM (7 June 1924 – 28 January 2016) was a Labour politician from New Zealand. He served as the sixth deputy prime minister, the minister of Finance, minister of Health and minister of Defence.

== Biography ==
=== Early life and career ===
Born in Auckland on 7 June 1924, Tizard was the son of Jessie May Tizard (née Phillips) and Henry James Tizard. He was educated at Meadowbank School and Auckland Grammar School, and earned a university scholarship in 1940. He was the dux of the school in 1941. In March 1943 he joined the Royal New Zealand Air Force. A navigator, he was commissioned as a pilot officer in February 1945, and promoted to flying officer in August 1945.

After the war, Tizard studied at Auckland University College, graduating with a Bachelor of Arts in 1948 and a Master of Arts in 1950. Majoring in history, his MA thesis was entitled Mr H.E. Holland's Blueprint for New Zealand and the World, Harry Holland having been a previous leader of the New Zealand Labour Party. He was involved in student politics and unionism and was president of the Auckland University Students' Association in 1948. He became a lecturer at Auckland University and was also a teacher at Tamaki College and Mount Albert Grammar School. By 1957 he was Mount Albert Grammar School's assistant headmaster.

=== Political career ===
Tizard made his first foray into national politics when he unsuccessfully ran for the Remuera electorate at the 1951 general election and again at the 1954 general election. He was finally successful at the 1957 election, winning in the electorate of Tamaki.

==== Member of Parliament ====
New Zealand Parliament
Years	Term	Electorate	Party
1957–1960	32nd	Tamaki	Labour
1963	33rd	Otahuhu	Labour
1963–1966	34th	Pakuranga	Labour
1966–1969	35th	Pakuranga	Labour
1969–1972	36th	Pakuranga	Labour
1972–1975	37th	Otahuhu	Labour
1975–1978	38th	Otahuhu	Labour
1978–1981	39th	Otahuhu	Labour
1981–1984	40th	Otahuhu	Labour
1984–1987	41st	Panmure	Labour
1987–1990	42nd	Panmure	Labour

Tizard was the Member of Parliament for Tamaki for the next three years. For the duration of the Second Labour Government Tizard was a backbencher. In the dying days of the government, Prime Minister Walter Nash overruled security services advice and approved the naturalization of a European emigrant living in Tizard's constituency who had in his youth been linked with Marxist circles, but had lived in New Zealand for many years and had a New Zealand wife and children. The police had not given him a clearance because, in their view, he had not accepted "New Zealand ideals". Nash minuted in 1960 that he should be allowed to naturalise. The file lay on his desk without action for many months however. Tizard found the file and took it to the Minister of Internal Affairs, Bill Anderton (who was the only minister in Wellington during the 1960 election period because he was not standing) and he signed the necessary approval. At the 1960 general election he was defeated by National's Robert Muldoon. Thereafter Tizard and Muldoon developed an intense rivalry with each other, occasionally bitter.

He returned to parliament in a 1963 by-election in the Otahuhu electorate, but in the 1963 general election was elected MP for Pakuranga. When United States Vice President Spiro Agnew visited Wellington in mid-January 1970, Tizard along with several other Labour Members of Parliament including Arthur Faulkner, Jonathan Hunt, and Martyn Finlay boycotted the state dinner in protest at American policy in Vietnam. However, other Labour MPs including Opposition Leader Norman Kirk attended the function which dealt with the Nixon Doctrine. In 1972 he became MP for Otahuhu again. In 1984 he became MP for Panmure, until he retired in 1990.

==== Third Labour Government ====
Tizard was Shadow Minister of Finance under leader Norman Kirk. Contrary to expectation, Tizard was instead appointed as Minister of Health and Minister of State Services when the Third Labour Government was elected in 1972. Bill Rowling was made Minister of Finance. Tizard was unhappy when informed of the decision but vowed he would put his all in to the job he was given. When exiting Kirk's office he said to colleague Warren Freer "I'll show the bastard what can be done with health". Tizard and Muldoon (the outgoing finance minister) believed Kirk withheld the finance portfolio for personal reasons and that Kirk's ill health made him impatient to achieve his objectives and wanted to eliminate the possibility of progress being hampered by a potentially reluctant minister. Both Freer and Deputy Prime Minister Hugh Watt had favoured Tizard for Finance, but Kirk thought he was not steady enough for the role and was suspicious of him as an "intellectual". Regardless, he soon proved one of Kirk's most effective ministers. As health minister he established a new practice nurse scheme, instigated changes to group practices and amalgamated several hospitals. At his retirement in 1990 Tizard said he was still then complimented on his work in the health portfolio.

Following the death of Kirk in 1974, Tizard was elected the Labour Party's deputy leader and consequently became Deputy Prime Minister of New Zealand. He was elected in an exhaustive caucus ballot, in the final iteration he defeated the Minister of Defence Arthur Faulkner 28 votes to 26. Kirk's replacement as Prime Minister, Bill Rowling, appointed Tizard to the portfolio that he had wanted all along – Minister of Finance. As Minister of Finance, Tizard's 1975 budget introduced a number of progressive measures, such as an expansion of spending on education which provided a standard bursary for all students in tertiary studies. He devalued the New Zealand Dollar by 15% to help local manufacturers and exporters. Overall his period in the finance portfolio was overshadowed by the impacts of the 1973 oil crisis which constrained what he could do.

==== Opposition ====
After the surprise defeat of the Third Labour Government in 1975 Tizard remained on the front bench as both Deputy Leader of the Opposition and Shadow Minister of Finance. On 1 November 1979 he was challenged for the deputy leadership by David Lange the new MP for Mangere. Lange succeeded in the challenge, narrowly defeating Tizard 20 votes to 18. Tizard did not take the defeat graciously, repeatedly referring in the caucus meeting to colleagues who voted against him as 'bastards'. Tizard even went as far as to tell Lange "I will never vote for you while your arsehole points to the ground".

In 1983 when Lange became leader Tizard was dropped from the finance portfolio and made Shadow Minister of Energy instead. Tizard made no secret of his displeasure in the demotion stating "If he [Lange] wants to give jobs for the boys that is his business."

==== Fourth Labour Government ====
In the Fourth Labour Government he was elected to the cabinet, due to being one of the few MPs with previous ministerial experience. Initially he held the roles of Minister of Energy, Minister of Statistics and Minister of Science and Technology during the governments first term from 1984 to 1987. After attaining cabinet rank again he found himself amongst colleagues belonging to a younger generation of thought different from his own leading him to once again be blocked from an economic portfolio. He turned his attention instead to safeguarding his portfolios from the privatisation agenda of finance minister Roger Douglas and his backers (the "Rogernomes"), fighting against energy corporatisation wherever he could. He was confronted with nearly all of the country's energy resources having been committed to the Think Big policies of the previous government which hampered his plans to convert New Zealand vehicles to alternative fuels. He suspended use of the controversial National Development Act and assisted with being repealed by the National Development Act Repeal Act. Likewise he decided to reinstate control over the construction of hydo-electric dams to the Ministry of Works and Development. Due to his refusal to sell Petrocorp he was removed from the energy portfolio at the end of the term.

As Minister of Science and Technology he established a review into government funding of scientific research. Despite their differences in the past, Tizard increasingly found himself on side with Lange who also came to oppose much of Douglas' agenda. He retracted his previous grudge against Lange and supported him when Douglas challenged for the leadership. Linking back to his earlier pledge to never vote for him, Tizard told Lange "I don't expect you to lie horizontally on the table so I can vote for you".

During the government's second term Tizard retained only the Science and Technology portfolio, but was also appointed Minister of Defence from 1987 to 1990. During this term he celebrated the milestone 30 years as a Member of Parliament. As Minister of Defence he pushed for the approval of purchasing four new Anzac-class frigates which was contentious due to significant opposition to the idea from the Labour Party membership. In 1989 he caused controversy when he said the recently deceased Japanese Emperor Hirohito was a war criminal who should have been "shot or publicly chopped up" at the end of World War II. Tizard also garnered public attention when he walked out of a live television interview with journalist Lindsay Perigo after Perigo persistently asked, despite warnings from Tizard, questions outside the intended topic of the interview. He briefly returned to the picture after realising he was still wearing the stage microphone.

In August 1989 Tizard announced he would retire from politics at the next general election. When Lange's replacement as Prime Minister Geoffrey Palmer held a complete reelection of cabinet in early 1990 Tizard was dropped from the cabinet due to his impending retirement. This went against a promise made to him by Lange that he could stay on as a minister until the end of the term. Angry with the outcome Tizard threatened to resign and force a by-election unless he could come to an agreement with the government over a car and housing arrangements for himself and his wife.

=== Life after parliament ===
His daughter Judith replaced him as MP for Panmure in 1990. She was a member of the Auckland Regional Council (ARC) and resigned after entering parliament. Tizard stood as the Labour candidate to fill the vacancy on the ARC. In a surprise result he was defeated in the by-election by Bruce Jesson of the incipient Alliance party. Tizard was annoyed but not surprised with the loss saying "It's no skin off my nose if the public want to be misguided and vote for a bunch of splinters." At the 1992 local-body elections he stood as a candidate for the newly created Auckland Regional Services Trust, but was unsuccessful.

In 2007 Tizard announced his candidacy for the Auckland District Health Board. He was elected to the board, at the age of 83.

In 2009, at the age of 85, Bob Tizard was asked to speak, as a historian, on aspects of World War II at a dinner held to honour Captain Jack Lyon, a New Zealand war hero and former Labour Party Member of Parliament. An mp3 recording of the 25-minute speech is available.

=== Death ===
Tizard died in Auckland on 28 January 2016, aged 91.

== Honours and awards ==
Tizard was appointed a member of Her Majesty's Privy Council in 1985. In the 2000 Queen's Birthday Honours, Tizard was appointed a Companion of the New Zealand Order of Merit, for public services.

== Personal life ==
While at university, Tizard met Catherine Maclean, while he was president of the Auckland University Students Association. On their second date Tizard told Maclean he was "going into politics. And I'm going to marry you." They married in 1951. The couple moved to Avondale and started a family, having four children in six years starting with Anne, followed by Linda, Judith and Nigel. They moved in 1957 to Glendowie in the Tamaki electorate. She then returned to university to complete her degree in zoology, and later began teaching at Auckland University before the couple divorced in 1980. Catherine was later Mayor of Auckland from 1983 to 1990 and Governor-General of New Zealand from 1990 to 1996. He is the father of former Consumer Affairs minister Judith Tizard, who succeeded her father as the Member of Parliament for Panmure in 1990.

Tizard later met Mary Nacey, with whom he had a son, Joe, in 1982. They married in 1983 with fellow Labour MP Russell Marshall (a Methodist minister) performing the ceremony and another MP, Sir Basil Arthur, was the best man. They subsequently divorced.

He then married Beryl Vignale of Canada in 1989. The couple had previously been engaged in 1944 during World War II. While Minister of Defence, following his second divorce, Tizard advertised in a Canadian Air Force magazine to find Beryl. He received ten replies, eight giving information on her whereabouts and two saying 'If you find her please tell me where she is'. While visiting Canada en route to attend the 50th anniversary of the Commonwealth Air Training Plan he visited Beryl for the first time since the war. Also having been married twice, she later repaid the visit before moving to New Zealand permanently to marry Tizard.

Tizard was interested in sport, particularly cricket, squash and golf. He was a member and administrator of the Auckland University Cricket Club. He was a captain at the Remuera Golf Club and represented it in several inter-club competitions. He also possessed an extensive stamp collection which in 1990 was valued at $500,000.

== Notes ==
New Zealand Parliament
Preceded by Eric Halstead	Member of Parliament for Tamaki; 1957–1960	Succeeded by Robert Muldoon
Preceded by James Deas	Member of Parliament for Otahuhu; 1963 1972–1984	Vacant Constituency abolished, recreated in 1972 Title next held by himself
Vacant Constituency recreated after abolition in 1963 Title last held by himself	Member of Parliament for Otahuhu; 1963 1972–1984	Constituency abolished
New constituency	Member of Parliament for Pakuranga; 1963–1972	Succeeded by Gavin Downie
New constituency	Member of Parliament for Panmure; 1984–1990	Succeeded by Judith Tizard
Political offices
Preceded by Lance Adams-Schneider	Minister of Health; 1972–1974	Succeeded by Tom McGuigan
Preceded by Jack Marshall	Minister of State Services; 1972–1974	Succeeded by Arthur Faulkner
Preceded by Bill Rowling	Minister of Finance; 1974–1975	Succeeded by Robert Muldoon
Preceded by Hugh Watt	Deputy Prime Minister of New Zealand; 1974–1975	Succeeded by Brian Talboys
Preceded by John Falloon	Minister of Statistics; 1984–1987	Succeeded by Margaret Shields
Preceded by Bill Birch	Minister of Energy; 1984–1987	Succeeded by David Butcher
Preceded by Ian Shearer	Minister of Science and Technology; 1984–1990	Succeeded by Margaret Austin
Preceded by Frank O'Flynn	Minister of Defence; 1987–1990	Succeeded by Peter Tapsell
Party political offices
Preceded by Hugh Watt	Deputy-Leader of the Labour Party; 1974–1979	Succeeded by David Lange
