= 1931 Hauraki by-election =

New Zealand by-election

- 27 May 1931
- Turnout: 8,161
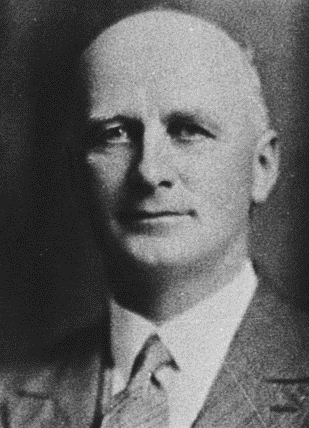

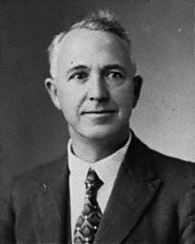

Candidate	Walter Massey	Charles Robert Petrie	Ebenezer Allan
Party	Reform	Labour	United
Popular vote	4,023	2,599	997
Percentage	49.29	31.84	12.21
Member before election
Arthur Hall
Reform
Elected Member
Walter Massey
Reform

The Hauraki by-election of 1931 was a by-election held in the Hauraki electorate during the 23rd New Zealand Parliament, on 27 May 1931. It was caused by the death of incumbent MP Arthur Hall of the Reform Party and was won by Walter Massey.

== Results ==
The following table gives the election results:

1931 Hauraki by-election
Party	Candidate	Votes	%	±%
Reform	Walter Massey	4,023	49.47	
Labour	Charles Robert Petrie	2,599	31.96	
United	Ebenezer Allan	997	12.26	−19.74
Country Party	Alexander Ross	513	6.31	
Majority		1,424	17.51	7.80
Turnout		8,132		
