= 33rd New Zealand Parliament =

Term of the Parliament of New Zealand

33rd Parliament of New Zealand
←	32nd Parliament	34th Parliament	→
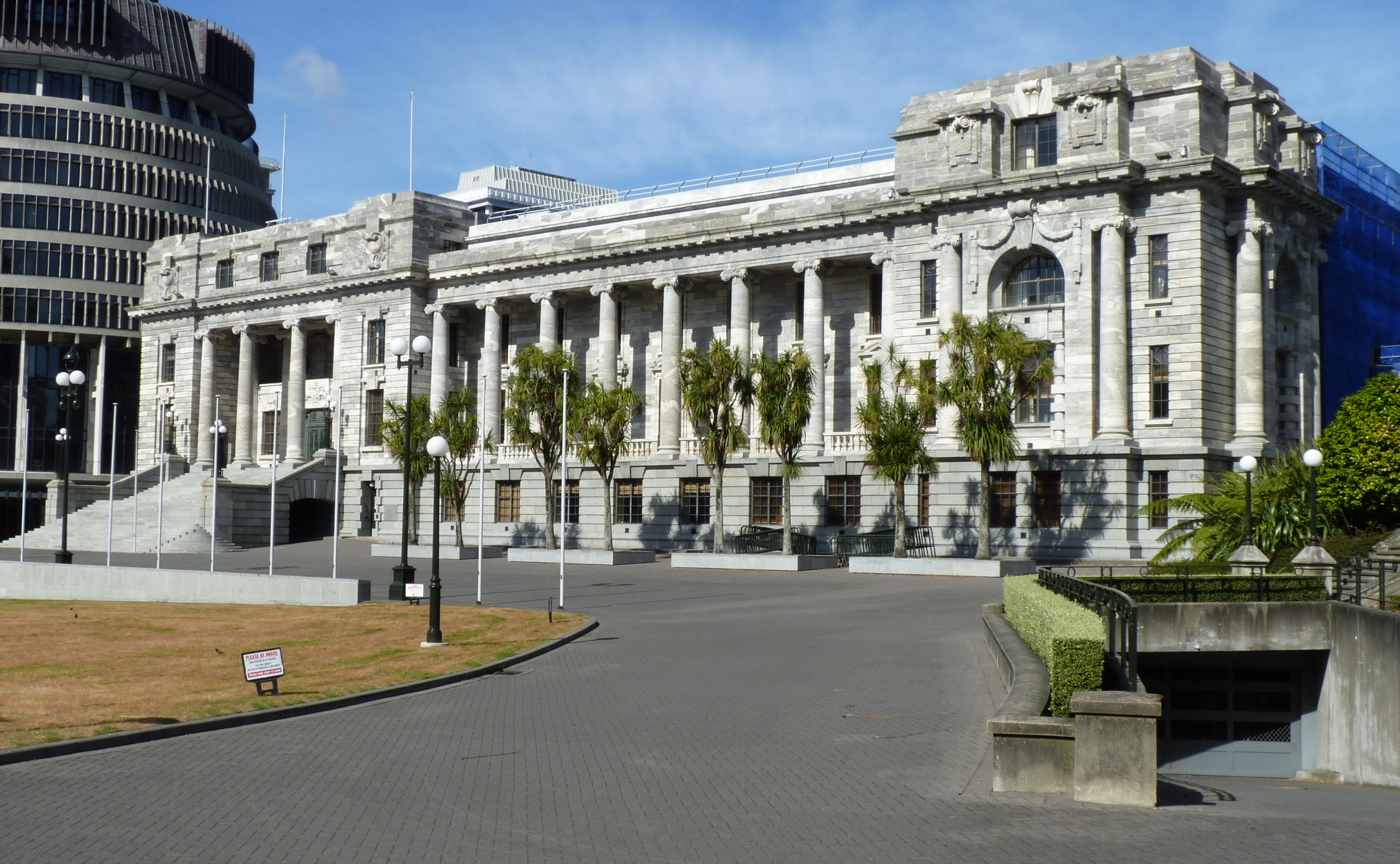
- Parliament House, Wellington

Overview
- Legislative body: New Zealand Parliament
- Term: 20 June 1961 – 25 October 1963
- Election: 1960 New Zealand general election
- Government: Second National Government

House of Representatives
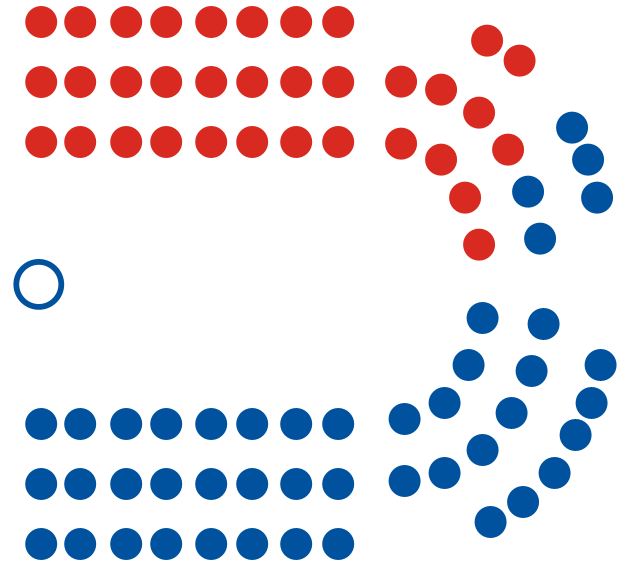
- Members: 80
- Speaker of the House: Ronald Algie
- Prime Minister: Keith Holyoake
- Leader of the Opposition: Arnold Nordmeyer — Walter Nash until 31 March 1963

Sovereign
- Monarch: HM Elizabeth II
- Governor-General: HE Brigadier Sir Bernard Edward Fergusson from 9 November 1962 — HE The Viscount Cobham until 13 September 1962

The 33rd New Zealand Parliament was a term of the New Zealand Parliament. It was elected at the 1960 general election on 26 November of that year.

== 1960 general election ==
The 1960 general election was held on Saturday, 26 November. A total of 80 MPs were elected; 51 represented North Island electorates, 25 represented South Island electorates, and the remaining four represented Māori electorates; this was the same distribution used since the 1957 election. 1,310,742 voters were enrolled and the official turnout at the election was 89.8%.

== Sessions ==
The 33rd Parliament sat for four sessions (there were two sessions in 1963), and was prorogued on 25 October 1963.

Session	Opened	Adjourned
first	20 June 1961	1 December 1961
second	7 June 1962	14 December 1962
third	12 February 1963	12 February 1963
fourth	20 June 1963	25 October 1963

== Ministries ==
The Labour Party under Walter Nash had been in power since the 1957 election as the second Labour Government, but was defeated by the National Party at the 1960 election by a twelve-seat margin. Keith Holyoake formed the second Holyoake Ministry on 12 December 1960, which stayed in power until Holyoake stepped down in early 1972. The second National Government remained in place until its defeat at the 1972 election towards the end of that year.

== Overview of seats ==
The table below shows the number of MPs in each party following the 1960 election and at dissolution:

Affiliation	Members	
Affiliation	At 1960 election	At dissolution
National Government	46	46
Labour Opposition	34	34
Total	80	80
Working Government majority	12	12

Notes

- The Working Government majority is calculated as all Government MPs less all other parties.

== Initial composition of the 33rd Parliament ==
The table below shows the results of the 1960 general election:

Key

National Labour Social Credit

Electorate results for the 1960 New Zealand general election
Electorate	Incumbent	Winner	Majority	Runner up
General electorates
Ashburton	Geoff Gerard		2,558	George Glassey
Auckland Central	Bill Anderton	Norman Douglas	1,846	Ray Presland
Avon	John Mathison		4,216	Lorrie Pickering
Awarua	Gordon Grieve		3,000	J P Wyatt
Bay of Plenty	Percy Allen		2,411	Thomas Godfrey Santon
Buller	Jerry Skinner		1,546	Ernie King
Christchurch Central	Robert Macfarlane		1,935	Tom Flint
Clutha	James Roy	Peter Gordon	3,863	Joseph Fahey
Dunedin Central	Phil Connolly		842	Norman Scurr
Dunedin North	Ethel McMillan		2,475	Brenda Bell
Eden	Duncan Rae	John Rae	1,902	Russell Gordon Penney
Egmont	William Sheat		3,933	J W Watson
Fendalton	Jack Watts	Harry Lake	2,722	Bill Rowling
Franklin	Alfred E. Allen		5,197	Howard Preston
Gisborne	Reginald Keeling	Esme Tombleson	291	Reginald Keeling
Grey Lynn	Fred Hackett		4,596	Brian Zouch
Hamilton	Lance Adams-Schneider		2,583	Sir Basil Arthur
Hastings	Ted Keating	Duncan MacIntyre	300	Ted Keating
Hauraki	Arthur Kinsella		2,635	Albert Clifford Tucker
Hawkes Bay	Cyril Harker		3,682	John Woolf
Heretaunga	Phil Holloway	Ron Bailey	2,576	Vere Hampson-Tindale
Hobson	Sidney Walter Smith	Logan Sloane	1,401	Vernon Cracknell
Hurunui	William Gillespie		2,731	Arthur Adcock
Hutt	Walter Nash		2,349	George Barker
Invercargill	Ralph Hanan		1,926	Oliver James Henderson
Island Bay	Arnold Nordmeyer		1,791	Fairlie Curry
Karori	Jack Marshall		4,313	Olive Smuts-Kennedy
Lyttelton	Norman Kirk		260	Jim Hay
Manawatu	Blair Tennent		3,120	Leonard Thomas Fischer
Manukau	Leon Götz		245	Cyril Stamp
Marlborough	Tom Shand		1,747	Robert William Hope
Marsden	Don McKay		4,351	John Swanson Reid
Miramar	Bill Fox		467	Bernard Lyons
Mornington	Wally Hudson		2,246	George Robert Thorn
Mount Albert	Warren Freer		1,676	Clarice Anderson
Napier	Jim Edwards		1,405	William John Gunn
Nelson	Stan Whitehead		1,767	Colin Wilson Martin
New Plymouth	Ernest Aderman		1,693	Ron Barclay
North Shore	Dean Eyre		1,817	Peter Lawrence Smith
Onehunga	Hugh Watt		4,705	Paul Brian Phillips
Onslow	Henry May		790	Maida Clark
Otago Central	Jack George		4,344	Brian MacDonell
Otahuhu	James Deas		2,774	Thomas Tucker
Otaki	Jimmy Maher	Allan McCready	2,044	Thomas William Cameron
Pahiatua	Keith Holyoake		4,934	Kingsley McKane
Palmerston North	Philip Skoglund	Bill Brown	133	Philip Skoglund (Note: Skoglund was first on election night, but lost after special votes were counted)
Patea	Roy Jack		2,304	David Costello Valley
Petone	Mick Moohan		2,918	Dick Martin
Piako	Stan Goosman		5,376	Henry Uttinger
Ponsonby	Ritchie Macdonald		4,744	Neil McLaughlan
Raglan	Douglas Carter		1,371	Alan Baxter
Rangitikei	Norman Shelton		3,889	Shaun Cameron
Remuera	Ronald Algie		6,109	Barry Gustafson
Riccarton	Mick Connelly		2,022	Deena V. Sergel
Rodney	Jack Scott		4,157	Phil Amos
Roskill	Arthur Faulkner		1,374	Geoffrey Taylor
Rotorua	Ray Boord	Harry Lapwood	358	Ray Boord
Selwyn	John McAlpine		2,839	John Palmer
St Albans	Neville Pickering	Bert Walker	298	Neville Pickering
St Kilda	Bill Fraser		835	Jim Barnes
Stratford	Thomas Murray		4,388	H M St George
Sydenham	Mabel Howard		4,793	Derek Quigley
Tamaki	Bob Tizard	Robert Muldoon	1,148	Bob Tizard
Tauranga	George Walsh		5,239	D C Goodfellow
Timaru	Clyde Carr		357	Ronald Erle White
Waikato	Geoffrey Sim		3,041	Arthur John Ingram
Waipa	Hallyburton Johnstone		3,241	Bob Reese
Wairarapa	Bert Cooksley		2,088	Allan Goldsmith
Waitakere	Rex Mason		3,709	John Herbert Wilkinson
Waitaki	Thomas Hayman		1,972	Les McKay
Waitemata	Norman King		1,249	Jolyon Firth
Waitomo	David Seath		3,951	Duncan Barclay McLaren
Wallace	Brian Talboys		5,736	E Harris
Wanganui	Joe Cotterill	George Spooner	160	E J Crotty
Wellington Central	Frank Kitts	Dan Riddiford	381	Frank Kitts
Westland	Jim Kent	Paddy Blanchfield	3,844	D A Hogg
Māori electorates
Eastern Maori	Tiaki Omana		3,025	Arnold Reedy
Northern Maori	Tapihana Paikea		3,372	George Russell Harrison
Southern Maori	Eruera Tirikatene		3,947	Rangi Tutaki
Western Maori	Iriaka Rātana		4,666	Pei Te Hurinui Jones

Table footnotes:

== By-elections during 33rd Parliament ==
There were a number of changes during the term of the 33rd Parliament.

Electorate and by-election		Date	Incumbent	Cause	Winner
Hurunui	1961	10 June	William Gillespie	Death	Lorrie Pickering
Waitaki	1962	10 March	Thomas Hayman	Death	Allan Dick
Buller	1962	7 July	Jerry Skinner	Death	Bill Rowling
Timaru	1962	21 July	Clyde Carr	Resignation	Sir Basil Arthur
Otahuhu	1963	16 March	James Deas	Death	Bob Tizard
Northern Maori	1963	16 March	Tapihana Paikea	Death	Matiu Rata
Grey Lynn	1963	18 May	Fred Hackett	Death	Reginald Keeling
