= 1963 New Zealand Royal Visit Honours =

Awards list for New Zealand

1963 Royal Visit Honours
- Previous: 1963 New Year Honours; Next: 1963 bravery awards
- Type: New Zealand royal honours: Royal Victorian Order
- Date: 11–18 February 1963
- Country: New Zealand
- Total recipients: 14

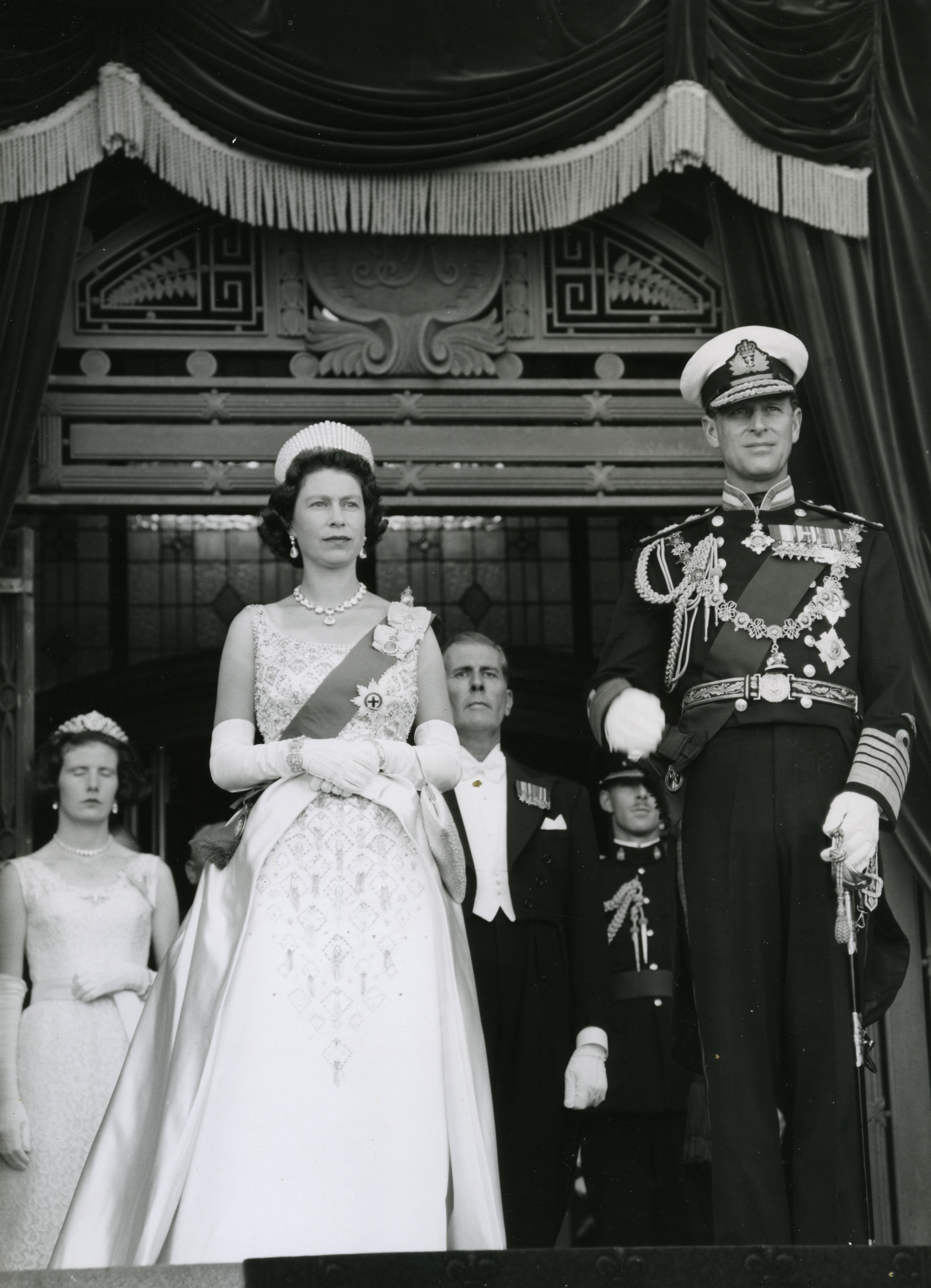
The Queen and the Duke of Edinburgh at the State Opening of Parliament in Wellington during their 1963 visit to New Zealand

The 1963 New Zealand Royal Visit Honours were appointments by Elizabeth II to the Royal Victorian Order, to mark her visit to New Zealand that year. During her visit, the Queen attended celebrations at Waitangi. The honours were announced on 11 and 18 February 1963.

The recipients of honours are listed here as they were styled before their new honour.

== Royal Victorian Order ==
=== Knight Grand Cross (GCVO) ===
- Brigadier Sir Bernard Edward Fergusson GCMG DSO OBE – governor-general of New Zealand.
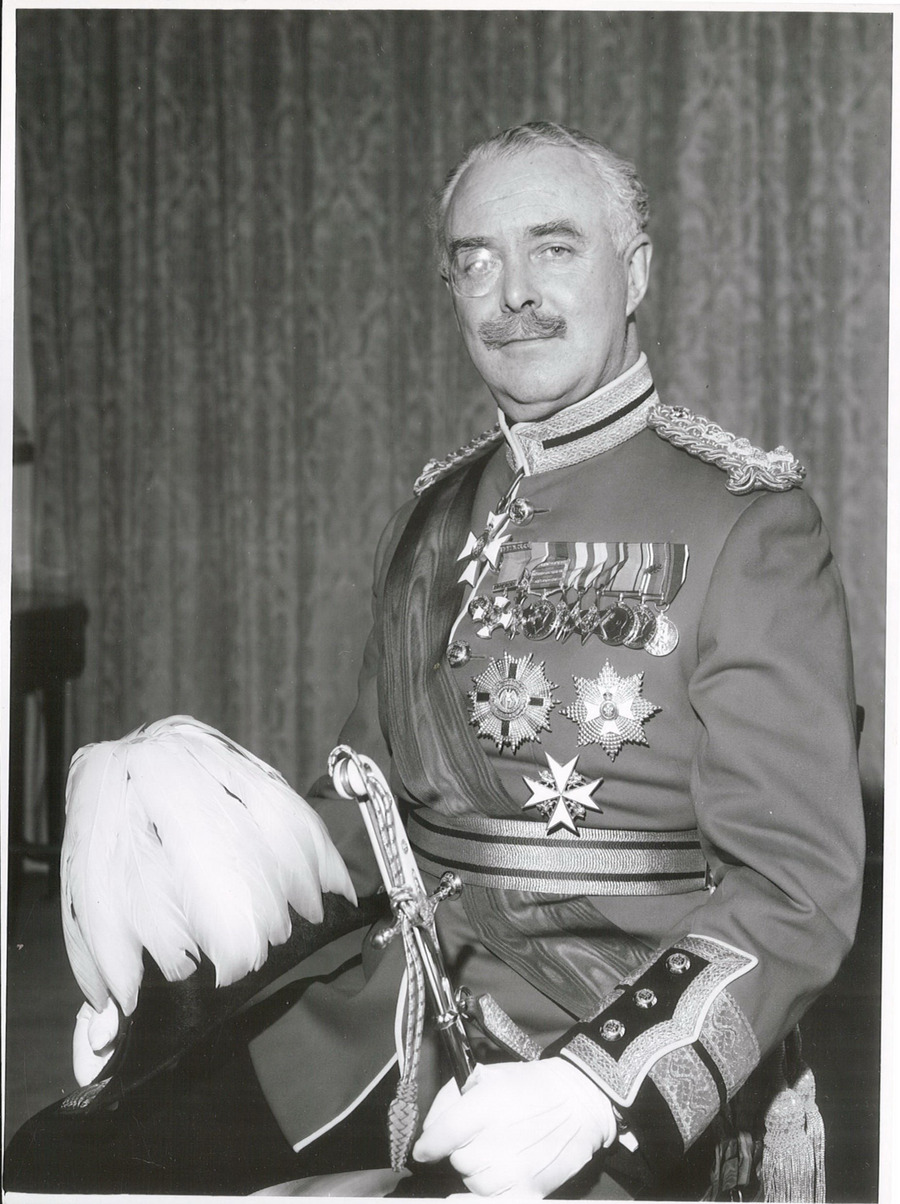
Sir Bernard Fergusson

=== Knight Commander (KCVO) ===
- Frank Leon Aroha Götz – Minister of Internal Affairs; of Auckland.
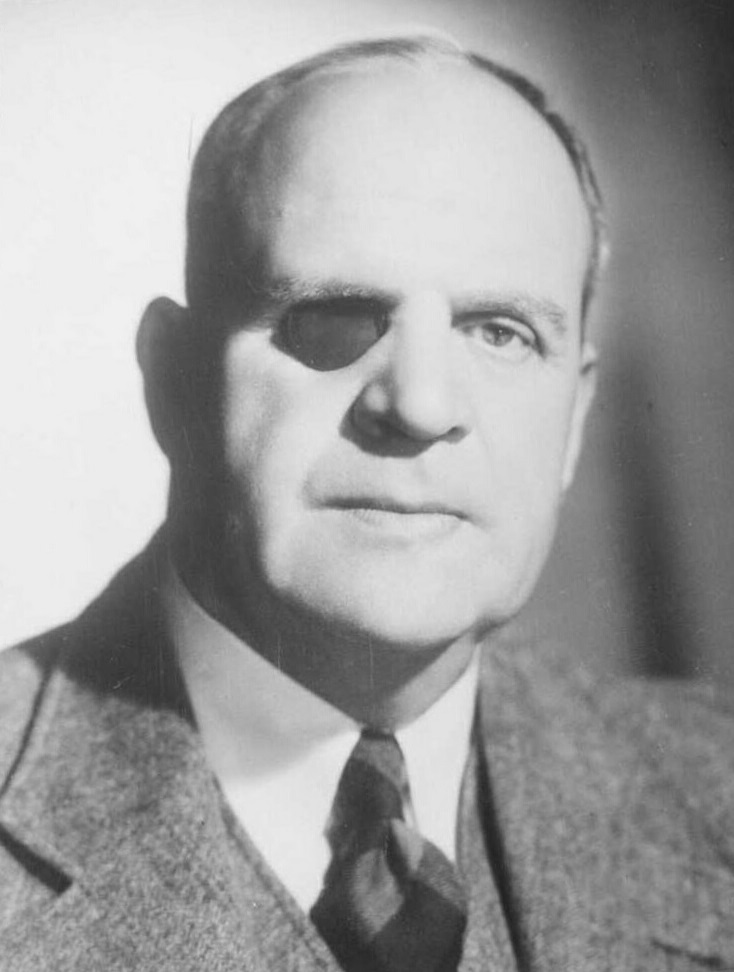
Sir Leon Götz

=== Commander (CVO) ===
- John Valentine Meech – of Wellington.
- Carl Leslie Spencer – of Wellington.

=== Member, fourth class (MVO) ===
- Major John Websiter Mawson – Royal New Zealand Armoured Corps; of Wellington.
- Patrick Jerad O'Dea MVO – of Lower Hutt.
- Charles Henry Williams MVO – of Wellington.

In 1984, Members of the Royal Victorian Order, fourth class, were redesignated as Lieutenants of the Royal Victorian Order (LVO).

=== Member, fifth class (MVO) ===
- Alonzo George Edgar Beal BEM – of Wellington.
- Major Harry Bowen Honnor – Royal Regiment of New Zealand Artillery; of Wellington.
- Douglas Alexander Johnston – of Wellington.
- Silvanus Gordon Mudge – of Wellington.

== Royal Victorian Medal ==
=== Silver (RVM) ===
- Arthur Henry Hart – detective sergeant, New Zealand Police; of Wellington.
- Angus William McDougall – detective senior sergeant, New Zealand Police; of Wellington.
- Harold Eugene Symonds – of Lower Hutt.
