= Walter Massey =

Walter Massey may refer to:

- Walter Edward Massey (1864–1901), president of Massey-Harris
- Walter E. Massey (born 1938), educator, physicist, and business executive
- Walter Massey (actor) (1928–2014), Canadian actor
- Walter William Massey (1882–1959), New Zealand politician of the Reform Party
