= John Boscawen =

New Zealand politician (born 1956)

The Honourable John Boscawen
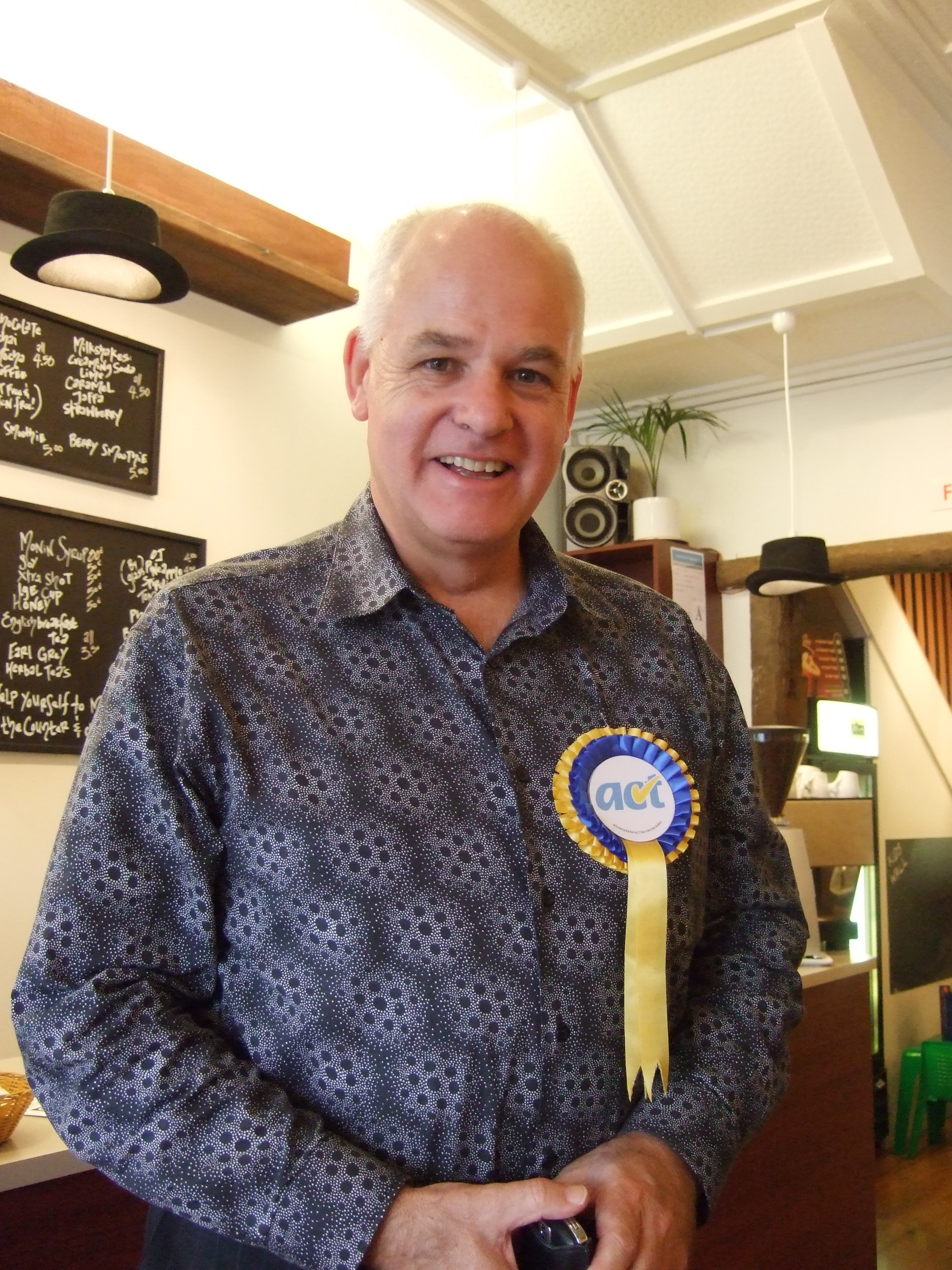
- Boscawen in 2009

Minister of Consumer Affairs
- In office 18 August 2010 – 3 May 2011
- Prime Minister: John Key
- Preceded by: Heather Roy
- Succeeded by: Simon Power

Deputy Leader of ACT Party
- In office 10 August 2010 – c. November 2012
- Leader: Rodney Hide
- Preceded by: Heather Roy
- Succeeded by: Kenneth Wang

Member of the New Zealand Parliament for ACT Party List
- In office 2008–2011

Personal details
- Party: ACT New Zealand
- Occupation: Businessman

John Spencer Boscawen (born December 1956) is a former New Zealand politician. He is a member of the ACT New Zealand Party and served as a member of the New Zealand House of Representatives from 2008 to 2011.

Boscawen briefly served as deputy leader of the ACT Party from August 2010 until sometime around the end of 2012, and Minister of Consumer Affairs from August 2010 until May 2011, and as ACT's parliamentary leader from May 2011 until the 2011 general election.

== Business career ==
Boscawen was an accountant in the 1980s, but became insolvent after borrowing heavily to invest in the sharemarket before the stockmarket crash of 1987. With help from his parents, he was able to return to investing, developing the K-Mart Plaza in Hastings.

He became an associate member of the New Zealand Business Roundtable.

== Political career ==
New Zealand Parliament
Years	Term	Electorate	List	Party
2008–2011	49th	List	4	ACT

ACT New Zealand was formed in 1994 and Boscawen became a member the following year. In 1996, he stood unsuccessfully for the party in the Epsom electorate. He has served on the party's board and has been its treasurer. In the 2004 ACT Party leadership election, he backed Stephen Franks to succeed Richard Prebble, over the eventual winner Rodney Hide.

However, Boscawen would later serve as Hide's Epsom campaign manager for the 2005 election and overall campaign manager in 2008. He also donated NZ$100,000 to the party. Before entering parliament he was best known for his campaign against the Electoral Finance Act, for which he organised protests and legal action and spent more than NZ$140,000.

=== Member of Parliament ===
In 2008, Boscawen was ranked fourth on the ACT party's list and also stood, unsuccessfully, in the North Shore electorate. With ACT winning 3.65% of the vote at the 2008 general election, Boscawen entered parliament as ACT's fourth list MP. ACT supported the Fifth National Government on confidence and supply; its leader and deputy leader, Rodney Hide and Heather Roy, were appointed as ministers outside of Cabinet. Boscawen sat on the Finance and Expenditure, Commerce, and Parliamentary Service select committees, and was ACT's spokesperson for a range of issues including Housing, Transport, Energy and Economic Development.

In 2009, Boscawen stood as ACT's candidate for the Mount Albert electorate, in the Mount Albert by-election. Boscawen placed fourth (968 votes), winning 4.72% of the votes cast. Boscawen provided the media with one of the memorable images of the by-election, when an environmentalist squashed a lamington on Boscawen's head during a live televised candidates debate.

On 17 August 2010, Boscawen challenged Roy for the deputy leader role and was successful with a 3–2 caucus vote. This decision followed Roy's attempt the previous year, which had been supported by ACT MP and co-founder Sir Roger Douglas, to replace Hide as party leader. As the new deputy leader, Boscawen was appointed to the government roles of Minister of Consumer Affairs and Associate Minister of Commerce, which had been respectively held by Roy and Hide as part of ACT's confidence and supply agreement with the governing National Party. As associate commerce minister, he was responsible for oversight of the Commerce Commission. While consumer affairs minister, Boscawen initiated consumer law reform that was eventually passed into law in 2013.

Hide resigned as ACT leader in May 2011 and was replaced by former Reserve Bank governor and National Party leader Don Brash, who was not at that time a member of parliament. Boscawen was retained as deputy leader but resigned his ministerial portfolios to become the parliamentary leader of the ACT Party. He was succeeded in both portfolios by National's Simon Power. On 9 May 2011 Boscawen was granted the right to retain the title of the Honourable for his lifetime.

While Boscawen was initially listed second on the ACT party list for the November 2011 general election, he announced in September that he would be retiring from politics. Boscawen declined to stand on the party list but contested the electorate vote in Tāmaki, which he, accurately, did not expect to win. Although he announced he would retire from politics, ACT referred to him as the party's deputy leader up until the end of 2012.

=== Post-parliamentary career ===
In January 2013 Boscawen became the president of the ACT Party. On 2 February 2014, after unsuccessfully running to be ACT Leader and Epsom candidate, he relinquished the role of president to allow classical liberal philosopher Jamie Whyte to become ACT Leader and David Seymour to become the party's new Epsom candidate.

== Philanthropy ==
Boscawen is a trustee of the Auckland Philharmonia Foundation and the Otahuhu College Foundation.
