= James Deas (politician) =

New Zealand politician

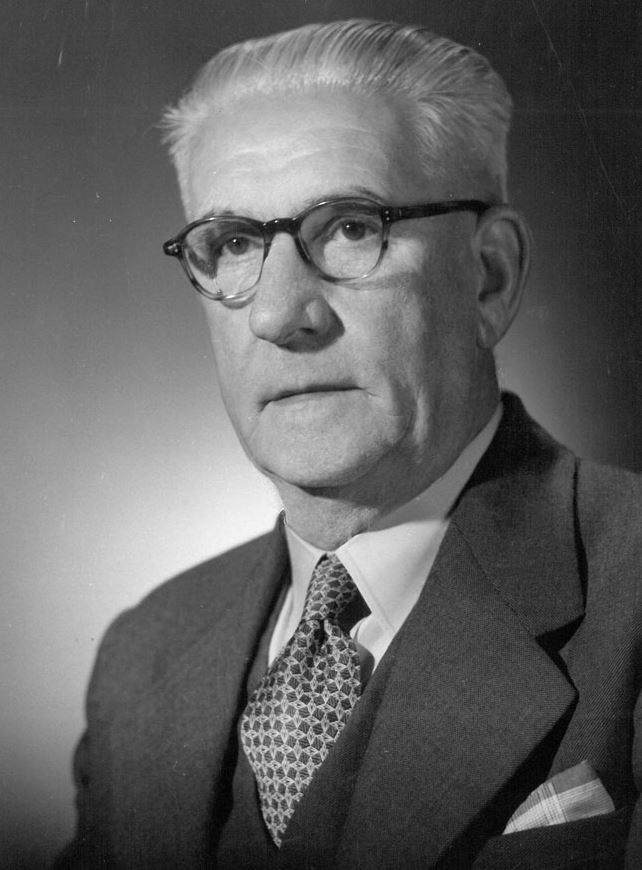

Member of the New Zealand Parliament for Otahuhu
- In office 13 November 1954 – 27 January 1963
- Preceded by: Leon Götz
- Succeeded by: Bob Tizard

Personal details
- Born: 1891 Leslie, Fife, Scotland
- Died: 27 January 1963 (aged 71–72) Auckland, New Zealand
- Party: Labour
- Children: 2

James Mackie Deas (1891 – 27 January 1963) was a New Zealand politician of the Labour Party.

== Biography ==
=== Early life and career ===
Deas was born in Leslie, Fife, Scotland, in 1891. He served in World War I as a member of the Black Watch and later worked for the Ministry of Pensions before moving to New Zealand in 1926. He settled in Papatoetoe and became a district newspaper correspondent for The New Zealand Herald.

He was secretary of the Otahuhu Unemployment Committee during the Great Depression. Deas then became a publisher for several suburban newspapers in South Auckland before joining the reporting staff of The New Zealand Herald during World War II. He moved to Wellington and spent four years as a journalist in the Parliamentary Press Gallery.

=== Political career ===
New Zealand Parliament
Years	Term	Electorate	Party
1954–1957	31st	Otahuhu	Labour
1957–1960	32nd	Otahuhu	Labour
1960–1963	33rd	Otahuhu	Labour

Following the war Deas moved back to Auckland and was elected Mayor of Otahuhu from 1950 to 1954. He was also a member of the Otahuhu High School Committee and chairman of the Otahuhu District School Committee. In addition he was President of the Otahuhu Free Kindergarten. In 1953, he was awarded the Queen Elizabeth II Coronation Medal.

He unsuccessfully stood as the Labour Party candidate for Otahuhu in the 1951 election. He won the Otahuhu electorate in 1954 and represented it until 1963, when he died. During the Second Labour Government Deas became quite critical of Prime Minister Walter Nash in caucus, thinking him too preoccupied with matters pertaining to foreign affairs and going as far as accusing him of ignoring domestic affairs. His sentiments were shared by many other MPs.

=== Death ===
Deas caught a severe bronchial chill in London whilst travelling from the 1962 Commonwealth Parliamentary Association conference in Lagos. He died suddenly at Middlemore Hospital on 27 January 1963, aged 71. He was survived by his wife and two sons.

The resulting 1963 by-election when he died was won by Bob Tizard.

== Notes ==
New Zealand Parliament
Preceded by Leon Götz	Member of Parliament for Otahuhu; 1954–1963	Succeeded by Bob Tizard
Political offices
Preceded by Albert Murdoch	Mayor of Otahuhu; 1950–1954	Succeeded by Jack Murdoch
