= Minister of Consumer Affairs (New Zealand) =

New Zealand minister of the Crown

The Minister of Consumer Affairs was a minister in the government of New Zealand with the responsibilities including corporate law and governance, financial markets, competition policy, consumer policy, protecting intellectual property, and trade policy and international regulatory cooperation, most of which is now administered by the Ministry of Business, Innovation and Employment. The position was established in 1984 and was absorbed into the office of Minister of Commerce and Consumer Affairs after the 2014 general election.

== List of ministers ==
The following ministers held the office of Minister of Consumer Affairs.

Key

Labour National NZ First Independent Alliance ACT

No.	Name	Portrait	Term of Office		Prime Minister
1	Margaret Shields		24 August 1987	2 November 1990	Lange
1	Margaret Shields		24 August 1987	2 November 1990	Palmer
1	Margaret Shields		24 August 1987	2 November 1990	Moore
2	Katherine O'Regan		2 November 1990	16 December 1996	Bolger
3	Robyn McDonald		16 December 1996	31 August 1998	Bolger
3	Robyn McDonald		16 December 1996	31 August 1998	Shipley
4	Peter McCardle		31 August 1998	10 December 1999	Shipley
5	Phillida Bunkle		10 December 1999	23 February 2001	Clark
-	Jim Anderton; Acting Minister		23 February 2001	15 August 2002	Clark
6	Judith Tizard		15 August 2002	19 November 2008	Clark
7	Heather Roy		19 November 2008	17 August 2010	Key
8	John Boscawen		17 August 2010	3 May 2011	Key
9	Simon Power		4 May 2011	14 December 2011	Key
10	Chris Tremain		14 December 2011	2 April 2012	Key
11	Simon Bridges		3 April 2012	30 January 2013	Key
12	Craig Foss		30 January 2013	6 October 2014	Key

== See also ==
- Ministry of Business, Innovation and Employment
- Minister of Commerce and Consumer Affairs
