= 1963 Otahuhu by-election =

New Zealand by-election

← 1960 general	16 March 1963	1963 general →
- Turnout: 9,683 (51.10%)
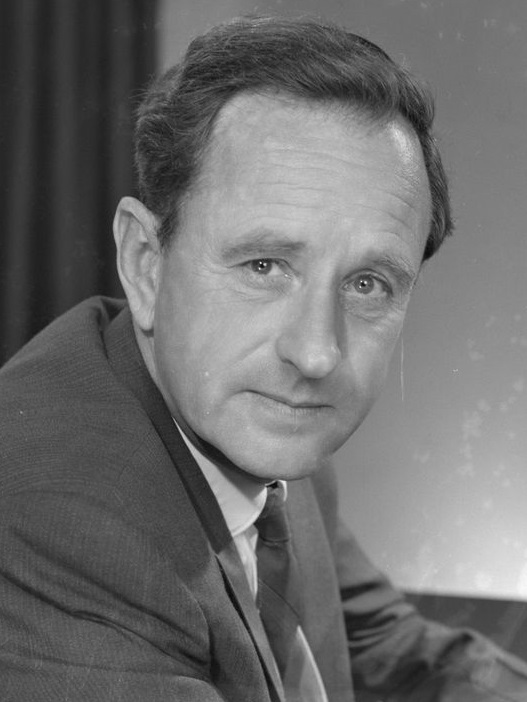

Candidate	Bob Tizard	Thomas Tucker
Party	Labour	National
Popular vote	6,108	3,450
Percentage	63.07	35.64
Member before election
James Deas
Labour
Elected Member
Bob Tizard
Labour

The Otahuhu by-election 1963 was a by-election held in the Otahuhu electorate in Auckland during the term of the 33rd New Zealand Parliament, on 16 March 1963.

== Background ==
The by-election was caused by the death of incumbent MP James Deas of the Labour Party on 27 January 1963. It was held the same day as the Northern Maori by-election.

== Candidates ==
=== Communist ===
The Communist Party chose trade unionist Stan Hieatt, who contested the Otahuhu seat in 1960, as their candidate once again.

=== Labour ===
As the Otahuhu electorate was scheduled for abolition at the end of the parliamentary session so the selection for the by-election candidate was also set to choose the candidate for the to be created Pakuranga electorate. The Labour Party chose the president of the Auckland Labour Representation Committee Bob Tizard, who had been MP for Tamaki from 1957 to 1960, as their candidate. Both party president Martyn Finlay and Colin Moyle (Labour's candidate for Hobson in 1957) were rumored to stand but both opted to stand in other electorates (Finlay in Waitakere and Moyle in Manukau) thus Tizard was selected unopposed.

=== National ===
The National Party chose Thomas Tucker a local taxation consultant, who contested Otahuhu in 1960, as their candidate. He won selection in preference to Lloyd Elsmore, the Mayor of Ellerslie, and Ray Presland, who stood for National in Auckland Central electorate in 1960.

=== Social Credit ===
The Social Credit Party decided not to contest the election. Party leader Vernon Cracknell said that the election was pointless and a misappropriation of taxpayer funds due to the seat being scheduled for abolition. "The byelection in Otahuhu, a seat which will be abolished in a few months' time, is unnecessary and a waste of public money" said Cracknell.

== Results ==
The following table gives the election results:

1963 Otahuhu by-election
Party	Candidate	Votes	%	±%
Labour	Bob Tizard	6,108	63.07	
National	Thomas Tucker	3,450	35.64	−3.69
Communist	Stan Hieatt	125	1.29	+0.60
Majority		2,658	27.45	
Turnout		9,683	51.10	−39.89
Registered electors		18,947		
Labour hold		Swing		

== Aftermath ==
The by-election was won by Bob Tizard who represented it from 16 March to 29 October only. When the electorate was abolished and replaced by the Pakuranga electorate at the 1963 election election, Tizard was elected for the Pakuranga seat instead. Tucker stood for National in Roskill, losing to Arthur Faulkner, while Hieatt stood unsuccessfully for the Onehunga seat.
