= Papatoetoe Rugby League Football Club =

Defunct NZ rugby league club, based in Auckland

Club information
- Full name: Papatoetoe Rugby League Football Club
- Short name: Papatoetoe
- Colours: Blue and Gold
- Founded: 1929
- Exited: 1932

Former details
- Grounds: Papatoetoe Recreation Ground; Wallace Road Reserve
- Coach: Joe Bennett (1929), J. Gedye (1929), Laurence Lovett (1931), Gallagher (1931), W. Coon (1931), and Joseph Henderson (1931)
- Captain: Mattson (1931)
- Competition: Auckland Rugby League

The Papatoetoe Rugby League Football Club was a rugby league club in Auckland, New Zealand which existed for 4 years from 1929 to 1932. They competed in the Auckland Rugby League lower grade competitions. They were made up of players from the suburb of Papatoetoe in South Auckland. At the time of their existence the area was rural, while today due to urban sprawl it has become a populated suburb of Auckland.

== History ==
=== Papatoetoe Schoolboys ===
==== Schoolboys (1926) ====
The first mention of a rugby league team in Papatoetoe was in fact 3 years before their clubs formation and was a schoolboy team formed from schools in the area.

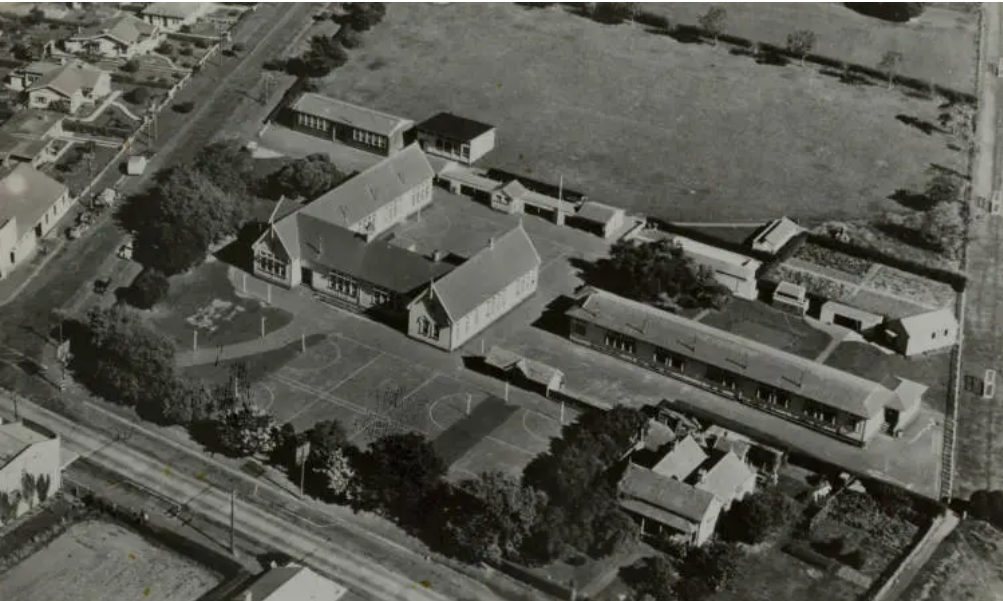
Papatoetoe Central Primary School in 1949. It opened in 1857.

It was the first ever year that schoolboy rugby league had been played in Auckland with games only beginning towards the end of the year in September. Papatoetoe schoolboys played a drawn game with Otahuhu on October 16, 1926, at Carlaw Park. The match was a curtain raiser to the Roope Rooster final between Richmond Rovers and Devonport United (North Shore Albions). Their two tries were scored by Manning and Pinfold.

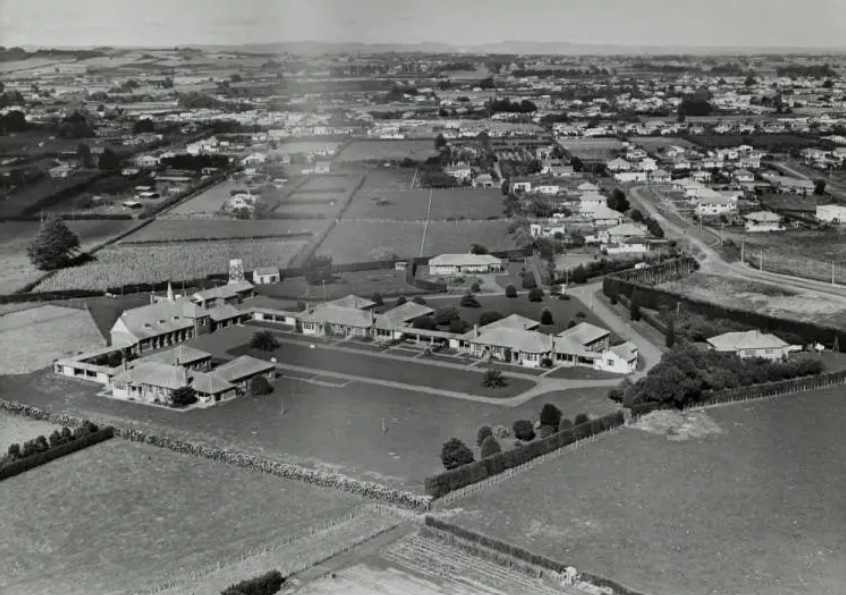
Dingwall Presbyterian Orphanage in Papatoetoe in 1930, where some of the schoolboys players came from.

It was stated that as well as including players from the Papatoetoe Primary School they also "included a number of the Papatoetoe Orphanage boys". The two school matches had been refereed by G. McCowatt, and Bill Mincham who had played for Auckland in 1915. His son Ted Mincham later played for New Zealand. The Auckland Star said that they 4 schoolboy teams that had played the curtain raisers "gave a good exhibition of football, making the play open, and throwing the ball about at every opportunity. It is intended next season to have a schoolboys' competition. Already a set of caps for the winners and a valuable cup have been offered for competition". Their only other match for the year was a 16–8 defeat to a Richmond West schoolboy side in the rugby league strong hold of Grey Lynn.

==== Schoolboys (1927) ====
The Papatoetoe schoolboys team of 1927 played in a much more organised competition with 10 games played. They won 4 and lost 6, scoring 40 and conceding 138. Their first win was against Otahuhu on May 28 when they won 6–0. On June 4 the Papatoetoe schoolboys played Richmond at Carlaw Park as one of the curtain raisers to the senior mens game. The Papatoetoe side also played a game against Otahuhu a day earlier at Carlaw Park as a curtain raiser to the Devonport v Richmond senior mens game on Kings Birthday.

==== Schoolboys (1928) ====
In 1928 the Papatoetoe schoolboys team finished 6th of 7 teams winning just 2 matches and drawing 1 of their 11 played. They beat Māngere Schoolboys 8–0 on June 30, and Ellerslie 14-0 a week later on July 14, but their other reported results were a 0–30 loss to Newmarket and a 0–22 loss to Richmond Schoolboys on August 18.

=== 1929 Inaugural Papatoetoe club season ===
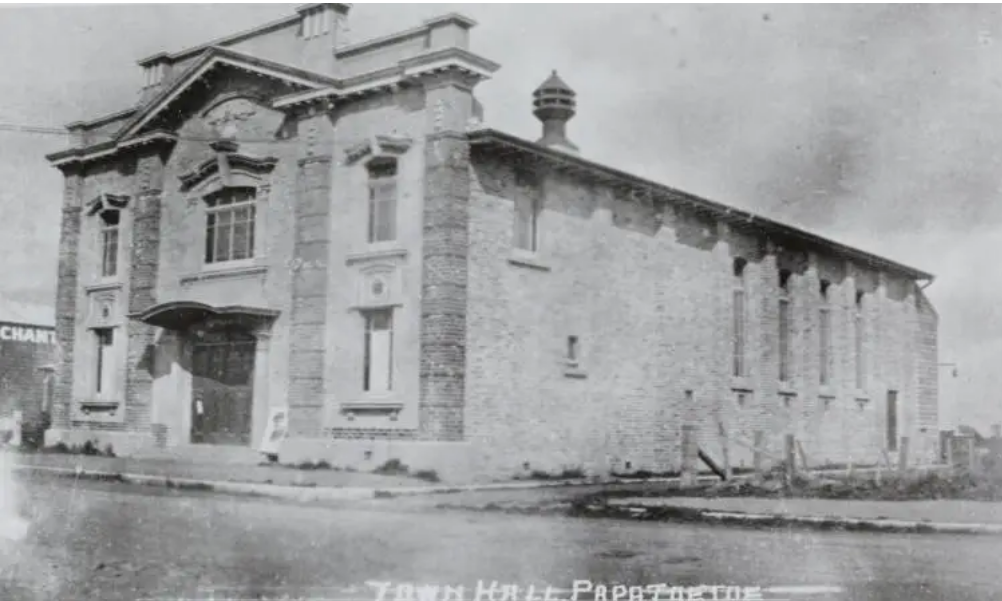
Papatoetoe Town Hall in 1925. The club was formed at a meeting here and they also held several social occasions here.

It was reported in the Sun newspaper on April 5, 1929, that during the week “an enthusiastic and well-attended meeting was held in the Papatoetoe Town Hall” to “discuss the advisability of forming a rugby league football club in Papatoetoe. The day the club had officially formed as in fact Tuesday, April 2. The convenors of the meeting were Mr. J. Gedye and Mr. Claude Gartside Culpan, and they explained the reasons for calling the meeting. It was then unanimously decided to form a club which would be called “Papatoetoe Rugby League Football Club”. They had decided to field three teams in the Auckland Rugby League competitions with a practice held on the following Saturday when official team coaches Joe Bennett and J. Gedye would meet the players. Mr. Ivan Culpan, secretary of the Auckland Rugby League also visited during the evening to give some advice. The same evening that the club was formed a deputation from the club “waited on the Papatoetoe Town Board and asked that they be allowed a portion of the local sports areas for the playing of the competition games. The board realising that the progress of the district warranted progress in sport, gave the deputation a very favourable hearing”. The Town Board had received the deputation on the Tuesday indicating that the initial meeting may have taken place on Monday, 1 April. The Town Board was said to have referred the matter to the “Reserves Committee”.

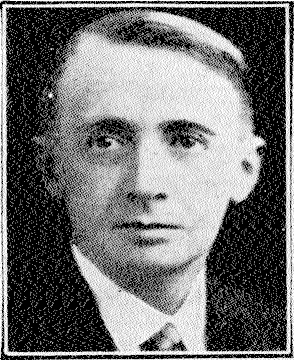
Arthur Hall, the clubs patron. He was a Member of Parliament representing the Reform Party.

The following officers were elected to their inaugural committee:- Patron, Mr. Arthur William Hall, M.P.; president, Mr. W. Civil; secretary, Mr. Claude Culpan; treasurer, Mr. J. Gedye; committee, Messrs. J. Bennett, R. Harper, L. Pinfold, Clarence Gartside Culpan, jun., R. Bennett; coaches, Messrs. J. Bennett and J. Gedye. Their coach, Joe Bennett was a New Zealand international rugby league player from 1920 and had played at senior and representative level from 1910 to 1920 in Auckland.

The Papatoetoe Town Board decided a few weeks later, at their May 1 meeting that they would “invite a conference of league and rugby football organisations to discuss provision of playing areas” for the 1929 season. The following evening the codes met and it was “decided to ask the respective organisations to make applications for grounds on the following basis: rugby union, 2; rugby league, 1; hockey, 1”. In the meantime the Papatoetoe club had been unable to gather enough players for three teams and was only able to enter one team, which would play in the 6th B Grade. However they did also field a team in the schoolboys competition. On May 1 the club requested assistance from the Auckland Rugby League in the purchase of jerseys, with the matter referred to the finance committee, giving them the power to act. Although not mentioned at the time it was later mentioned that the clubs colours were blue and gold.

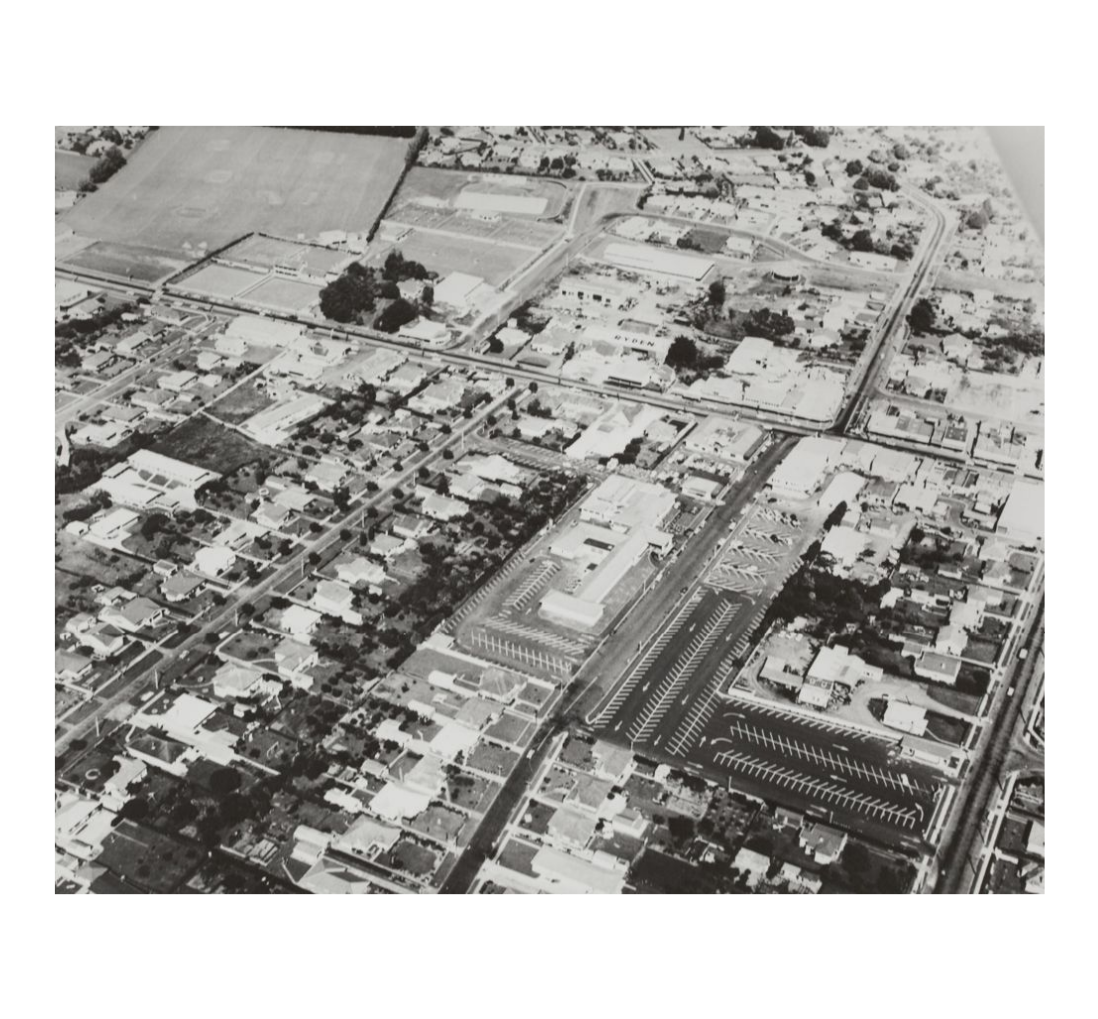
The Papatoetoe Recreation Ground in 1964 where the sides played matches in the upper left.

Their first ever match was against Richmond B at the Papatoetoe Recreation Ground at 2pm on May 4, 1929, with Mr. W. Weston refereeing. The team struggled, losing 37–0, however the Richmond club was the strongest junior club in Auckland in the 1920s and 30s and the Richmond B team would go on to win the grade undefeated, thrashing most teams by similar scores. The first ever Papatoetoe team was published in the New Zealand Herald and was: R. Docherty, Leonard Leaning, Alexander Bow, A. Culpan, R. Field, T. Fielder, Stanley Lusby, Kenneth Pennell, J. Harvey, George Mains, Samuel Pinfold, G. Hamilton, Ronald Leaning, and T. Greer. They performed creditably in the 1929 season, finishing 6th in the 9 team competition, with 5 wins, a draw, and 8 losses, scoring 140 points and conceding 215.

On June 15 the first ever senior game of rugby league was played in Papatoetoe when Otahuhu and Point Chevalier Senior B teams met at the Papatoetoe Recreation Ground. The two teams were first and second on the table and finished that way at the end of the season. A crowd of 1,000 interested onlookers turned up to see Otahuhu upset the leaders 10–6. The Auckland Star wrote that “it was a wise move to play a senior match at Papatoetoe, and it is to be hoped that the Auckland League will send teams more often to the district”.

To raise money and foster club spirit the club held a series of “progressive card evenings” in the club's rooms, with the first held on Thursday, August 8. It was reported that Mr H. McMechan and Mr. Barrington won prizes at the first event. It was reported in mid November that “in view of the success of [the] card evenings held weekly during the winter months…, it was decided at a function held in the Renown Hall on Thursday evening to continue the evenings for a further period. An average attendance of about forty people was reported by the committee”. On November 2 the league club entered an 880-yard relay team in the opening carnival of the Papatoetoe Amateur Athletic and Cycle Club at the recreation ground. In early October the Papatoetoe Town Board “sought the cooperation of the Auckland Rugby League in a gala day attraction at the opening of the band rotunda” at the Wallace Road Park Reserve on December 14. The league referred the matter to the Papatoetoe League Club for report. The Wallace Road Reserve was situated behind the Papatoetoe Town Hall on the present day site of the Allan Brewster Leisure Centre.

=== 1930 Season (4th, 5th and Schoolboy Grades) ===
The 1930 season saw Papatoetoe field teams in the 4th and 5th grades as well as a schools team. On May 6 a conference was held by the Papatoetoe Town Board with representatives of the league club, the rugby union club, hockey club, cricket club, and amateur athletic and cycling clubs. The meeting was to discuss the paying of fees by the clubs for the use of sports areas in the town district. The suggestion by the Town Board was that the clubs would be charged £7 10s for a playing area for a season. The clubs “expressed the opinion that the charge was not excessive, considering the work the board intended to carry out, but they questioned the ability of their clubs to find the money”.

On Thursday evening, May 22 the club held an “old time dance” at the Papatoetoe Town Hall with music supplied by the Papatoetoe Old Time Orchestra. The hall was decorated in the clubs colours of blue and gold with Mr. J. Henderson and W. Postlewait “in charge of the floor”. The club was congratulated by patron, and M.P. A.W. Hall on the progress that they had made since their inception. Competition dances were held along with a Euchre tournament which was won by Mrs. F. Lusby and Mr. Lusby. At the same event the club's secretary, Mr. Claude Gartside Culpan said three teams had been entered for the season and training was being given to thirty schoolboys. Claude Culpan was a brother of Ivan Culpan, long time secretary of Auckland Rugby League, and Nelson Culpan who was on the New Zealand Rugby League board. Ultimately they didn't field 3 adult teams but did field one more than the previous season with two sides playing.

The 4th Grade team only won around 3 of their matches, losing 9 to finish near the bottom of the standings. Likewise the 5th Grade team struggled, reportedly winning 2 matches and losing 12. Their team for the 7th of June match was Hely, McCauley, Leaning (2), Pinfold, Pennell, Hamilton, Hyland, Billington, Paterson, Marshall, Fielder, Graham, Matson, and Lusby. Their primary schools side performed much better, winning at least 5 of their games, drawing 1, and losing 4 to finish relatively high in the 18 team standings.

On December 4 the club held their final card evening of the year at the Renown Hall in Papatoetoe. Their card season had run from May to December, and a “large attendance of players and supporters of the club” was present. Treasurer Mr. Laurence Lovett presented the prizes for the evening and reported that the club had had a successful season financially. Their patron, the Reform Party M.P. Arthur Hall made a lengthy speech about the comparison's between parliament and sports which was quoted in part in the Auckland Star on November 3.

=== 1931 season (3rd Open, 4th, 7th, and Schoolboy Grades) ===
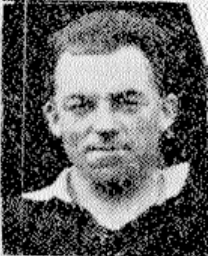
Neville St George, their auditor.

At their 1931 annual meeting in mid April a large attendance of players and supporters was present. With F. Healy presiding the report and balance sheet showed that the club was in a sound financial position. The following officers were elected:- Patron, Mr. Arthur Hall, M.P.; president, Mr. J. Franklin; vice presidents, Messrs. Eric Holdsworth Burton, W. Balderson, G. Cregan, F.E. Carr, H.C. Ernest, William Dulihanty, P. Dawson, J. Walker, W. Young, Thomas Richard Smytheman, William Nesbitt, B.L. Liversy, F. White, Albert George Grinter, P.E. Suttie, W. Willcox, C.J. Mahon, J. Gedye, P.W. Walker, Dr. James Jefcoate Valentine and Alfred Barrett Jameson; secretary, Mr. Laurence William Lovett; assistant secretary, Mr. C. Patterson; auditor, Mr. Neville St George; chairman of committee, Mr. J. Kidd; club captain, Mr. Joseph Henderson; coaches, Messrs. Laurence Lovett, Gallaher, Coon, Henderson; executive committee, Messrs. J. Kidd, E. Leaning, C.G. Culpan, F. Healy, E. Morris, N. Harris, W. Coon, R. Marshall, and J. Henderson. Their auditor, Neville St George was a former New Zealand rugby league international who was still playing senior rugby league at this time but nearing the end of his career. He was living in Papatoetoe at the time despite playing for the North Shore Albions based in Devonport where he had grown up. They decided to nominate five teams for the season, third grade open, fourth grade, fifth grade, sixth grade, and schoolboys. Almost immediately after being named patron once more, Arthur Hall collapsed while in Wellington due to an intracerebral hemorrhage on April 16 and died 2 days later at Wellington Hospital aged 50.

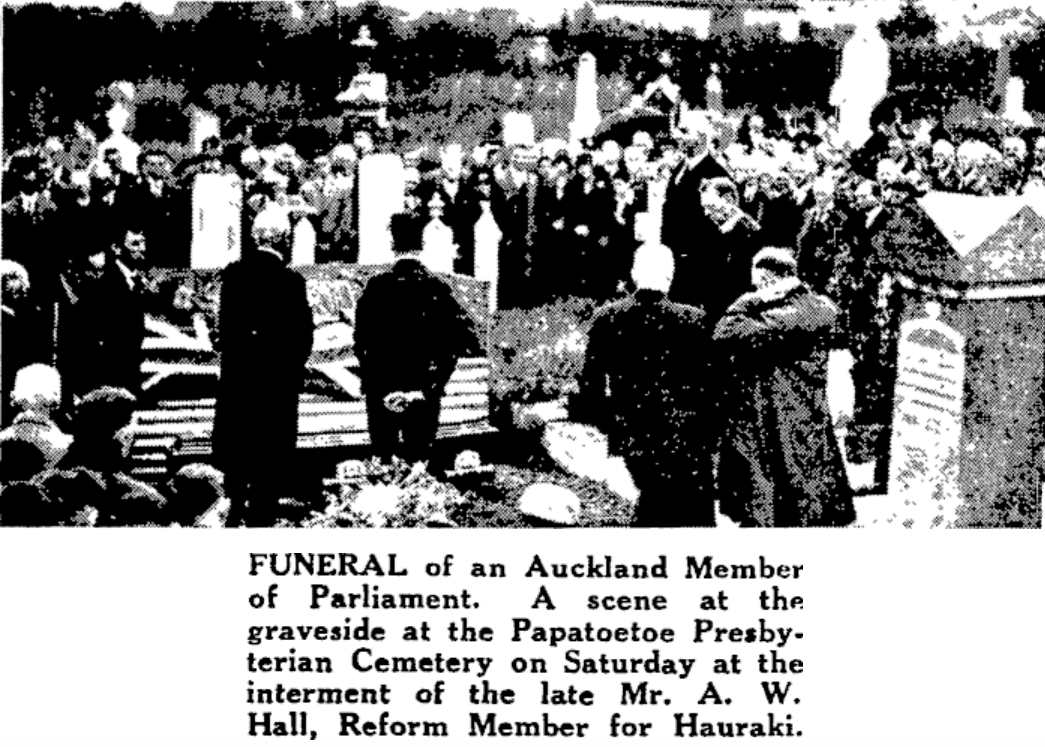
The funeral of the Papatoetoe clubs patron, MP Arthur Hall on April 20, 1931.

Very few results were reported during the season. Of the 3rd grade open sides 12 matches only 3 results were reported. They were a 27–0 loss to Marist Old Boys on June 20, a win by default over Glen Lynn on July 4, and a 17–0 loss to Richmond Rovers on July 11. They then lost to Ponsonby United in the first round of the knockout competition on September 5. Their team for their first match of the season was Abbott, Campbell, Dawson, Billington, McDonald, Pinfold, Dockerty, Rawson, Mattson (captain), Pennell, Linburn, Culpan, Fowler, Green, and McKenzie. Their 4th Grade side finished towards the bottom of the standings with just one reported win (5-0 v Papakura on June 27), and 9 losses. The win over Papakura was played at Prince Edward Park in Papakura and a small piece describing the match was published in the Franklin Times. Their winning try came in the second half after they broke out and followed up a kick to score near the posts. The Papatoetoe 7th Grade team faired a little better, winning 3 matches, drawing 2, and losing 4, with 6 other results not reported. This meant that they finished around mid table in the 8 team competition. Their primary school team had 5 wins reported and just 1 loss with 9 scores not reported meaning they likely finished in the first 3 out of 10 sides competing.

On June 3 the club published a notice in the Auckland Star newspaper thanking Mr. R. Hatton for his donation for their jersey fund, while they posted a similar notice on the same day in the New Zealand Herald thanking Mr. R. Hilton. On July 24 the club held their annual ball at the Papatoetoe Town Hall. The hall was decorated in their blue and gold colours with Mr. J. Franklin, the club president welcoming visitors. While Messrs. Laurence Lovett, J. Smith, J. Henderson, Rawlands, and Kidd in charge of the programme.

=== 1932 Final Season (5th grade, Schoolboys) ===
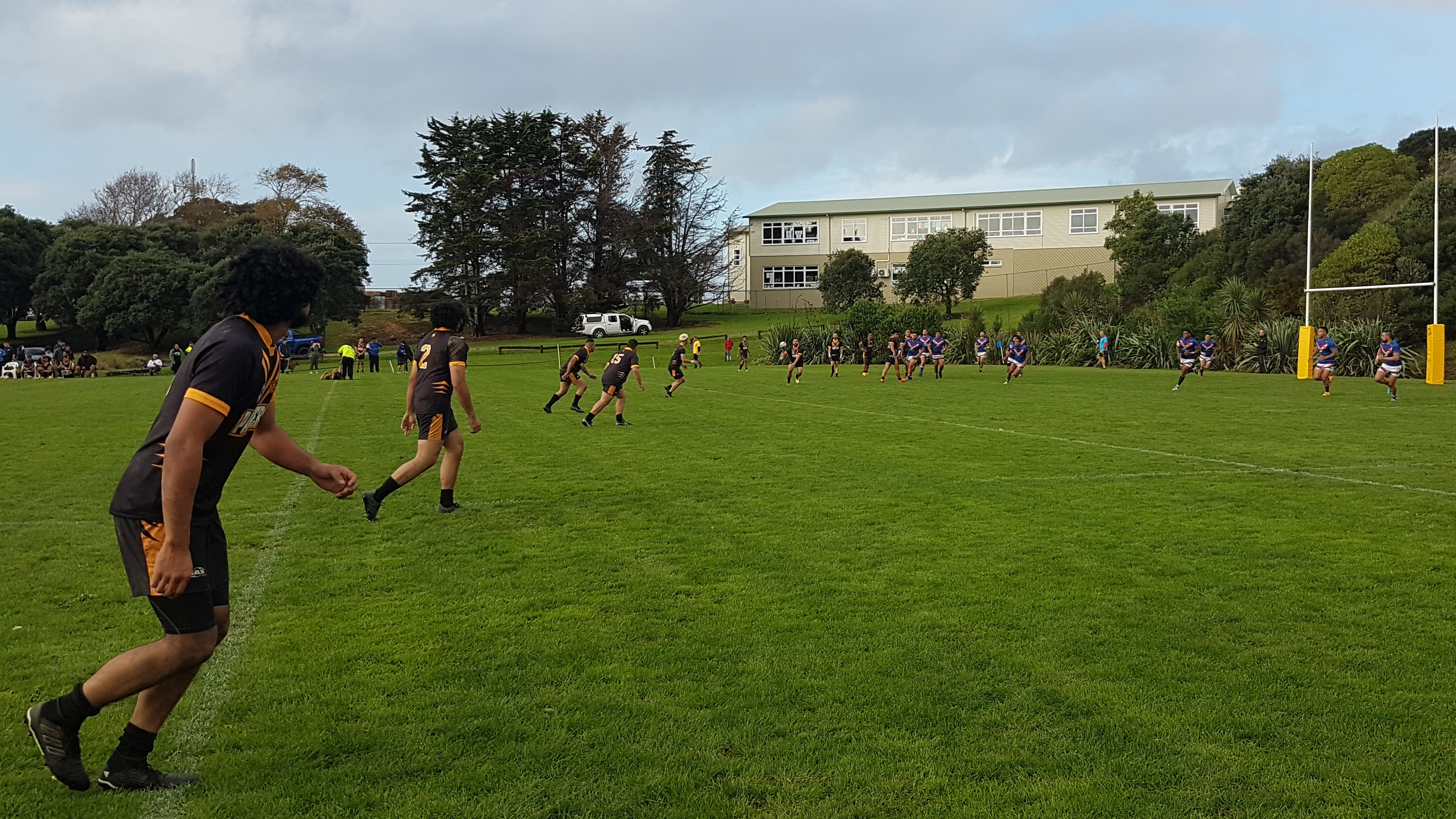
Papatoetoe Panthers v Te Atatū Roosters at Kohuora Park, Papatoetoe in 2022.

In 1932 the Papatoetoe club only fielded a single side in the adult grades, which was in the 5th Grade, and their schoolboys team once more. The 5th Grade team struggled and reportedly only won one match, 13–0 against Akarana on August 27, and 12 losses where they struggled to score any points. Their schoolboys side was also not particularly competitive, winning 2, losing 9, and having 8 results not reported to finish near the bottom of the standings. Following the season the club no longer fielded any teams and rugby league was not represented by any clubs in the area until the Papatoetoe Panthers club formed decades later which is based at Kohuora Park in Papatoetoe.

=== Team Records ===
==== Most Senior Team ====
The season record for the most senior men's team in the club.

Year	Grade	Club Name	Pld	W	D	L	PF	PA	PD	Pts	Position (Teams)
1929	6th B	Papatoetoe	14	5	1	8	140	215	-75	11	6th of 9
1930	4th	Papatoetoe	18	3	0	9	73	227	-154	6	10th of 11
1931	3rd Open	Papatoetoe	12	1	0	2	0	44	-44	2	4th of 6
1932	5th	Papatoetoe	16	1	0	12	20	268	-248	2	11th of 12
1929-32	TOTAL	-	60	10	1	33	233	754	-521	21	

==== Schoolboy Team Record ====
Year	Grade	Club Name	Pld	W	D	L	PF	PA	PD	Pts	Position (Teams)
1926	Schoolboys	Papatoetoe	2	0	1	1	14	22	-8	1	5th of 6
1927	Schoolboys	Papatoetoe	10	4	0	6	40	138	-98	8	6th of 9
1928	Schoolboys	Papatoetoe	11	2	1	8	33	166	-30	5	6th of 7
1929	Schoolboys	Papatoetoe	19	4	3	9	91	170	-79	11	7th of 11
1930	Schoolboys	Papatoetoe	14	5	1	4	73	68	5	11	6th of 9
1931	Schoolboys	Papatoetoe	15	5	0	1	63	12	51	10	4th of 18
1932	Schoolboys	Papatoetoe	19	2	0	9	18	49	-31	4	7th of 9
1929-32	TOTAL	-	90	22	6	38	332	625	-293	50	
