= Judith Tizard =

New Zealand politician

The Honourable Judith Tizard
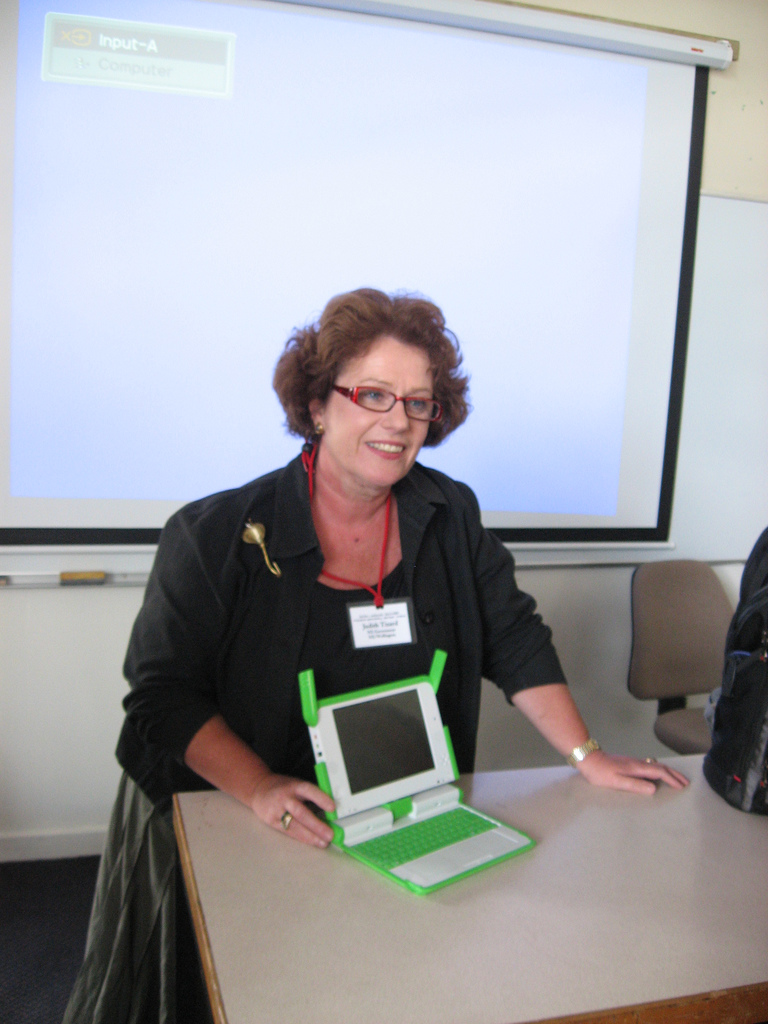
- Tizard at the 2007 Kiwi Foo Camp

6th Minister of Consumer Affairs
- In office 15 August 2002 – 19 November 2008
- Prime Minister: Helen Clark
- Preceded by: Jim Anderton
- Succeeded by: Heather Roy

Member of the New Zealand Parliament for Auckland Central
- In office 12 October 1996 – 8 November 2008
- Preceded by: Sandra Lee
- Succeeded by: Nikki Kaye

Member of the New Zealand Parliament for Panmure
- In office 27 October 1990 – 12 October 1996
- Preceded by: Bob Tizard
- Succeeded by: Seat abolished

Personal details
- Born: Judith Ngaire Tizard; 3 January 1956 (age 70) Auckland, New Zealand
- Party: Labour
- Parents: Bob Tizard (father); Catherine Tizard (mother)
- Education: University of Auckland
- Profession: Restaurant owner and manager

Judith Ngaire Tizard (born 3 January 1956) is a former New Zealand politician, and a member of the Labour Party.

== Early life and career ==
Tizard was born at Auckland's St Helen's maternity hospital in Pitt Street in 1956. She was educated at Glendowie College. Born into a political family, her mother, Dame Catherine Tizard, served as Mayor of Auckland City and as Governor-General and her father, Bob Tizard, was a prominent Labour Party cabinet minister and Deputy Prime Minister. She followed her parents into politics, joining the Labour Party herself in 1973.

After moving from Auckland to Wellington, when her father became a cabinet minister, Tizard began studying politics at Victoria University and got a job in the Labour Party Research Unit from 1976 to 1977. She became more enthusiastic about her work, spending more time in that than study before returning to Auckland and working as a cook in a restaurant owned by one of her friends. She was elected a member of the Auckland Electric Power Board in 1977, remaining a member until 1983. Her mother commented that it was "...another telling demonstration of the power of a recognisable name on a ticket. As she (Judith) said herself, who in their right mind would elect a 21-year-old barmaid to run a power board? That's how she had described herself on the ticket."

Later, Tizard finished her Bachelor of Arts (BA) in History from the University of Auckland. She became a waitress, restaurant owner, and manager of O'Connells Restaurant on O'Connell St in Auckland (1978–1982), and was involved in the catering industry (1981–1984). In 1986 she stood unsuccessfully for a seat on the Auckland City Council in 1986 in the central ward, but narrowly missed out on election. She was elected a member of the Auckland Regional Council in 1988. She was re-elected in 1989 before resigning in 1991.

== Member of Parliament ==
New Zealand Parliament
Years	Term	Electorate	List	Party
1990–1993	43rd	Panmure		Labour
1993–1996	44th	Panmure		Labour
1996–1999	45th	Auckland Central	11	Labour
1999–2002	46th	Auckland Central	19	Labour
2002–2005	47th	Auckland Central	21	Labour
2005–2008	48th	Auckland Central	18	Labour

Tizard stood unsuccessfully for the safe National seat of Remuera in the 1981 election. She was an electorate secretary in the Mount Albert electorate for Helen Clark from 1984 to 1987. In 1986 Tizard sought the Labour nomination for the seat of Papatoetoe, but lost out to Ross Robertson. At the 1987 election she contested Remuera again. Election night projections suggested she had taken the seat off National; ultimately she reduced the majority of Doug Graham to just 406 votes. She was the only Labour candidate to come remotely close to winning Remuera. From 1987 to 1990 she was an electorate secretary in the Panmure electorate for her father. From 1987 to 1989 she was vice-president of the Auckland Regional Council of the Labour Party.

On his retirement she succeeded her father as Labour's candidate for Panmure. She entered Parliament at the 1990 election and in November 1990 she was appointed Labour's spokesperson for Immigration and Arts & Culture by Labour leader Mike Moore. After being re-elected in 1993, she shifted her candidacy to Auckland Central, which she won in the 1996 election, defeating Sandra Lee. In 1993, Tizard was awarded the New Zealand Suffrage Centennial Medal. In 1999, Tizard served as the Minister assisting the Prime Minister on Auckland issues, which would develop into the portfolio of Minister for Auckland Issues in 2002.

She became a Minister outside of Cabinet, serving as Minister of Consumer Affairs, Associate Minister for Arts, Culture and Heritage, Associate Minister of Transport, Associate Minister of Commerce, and Minister responsible for Archives New Zealand and the National Library.

Before the 2008 general election Tizard was placed 38th on Labour's list, down from 18th in 2005. This was a relatively low placing for a minister. She was then defeated in her electorate by National's Nikki Kaye by a margin of 1,497 votes. Due to the scale of Labour's defeat that year, her list placing was too low to allow her to remain in Parliament as a list MP; her only chance of returning would be if Labour list MPs quit.

On 25 March 2011, Labour list MP Darren Hughes resigned from Parliament. Whilst Tizard was next in line, Labour Party president Andrew Little expressed preference for Louisa Wall to replace Hughes as she intended to contest the 2011 general election, unlike Tizard and the four other list candidates preceding Wall (Mark Burton, Mahara Okeroa, Martin Gallagher and Dave Hereora). Tizard, like her lower-ranked colleagues, decided not to take the seat.

Tizard now works in the constituency office of Phil Twyford, incumbent Member for Te Atatū.

== Controversy ==
In 2008 Tizard championed an amendment to the Copyright Act, which required internet service providers (ISPs) to develop policies to terminate the Internet account of repeat copyright infringers. She defended this position when meeting Internet lobby groups, saying it is necessary to protect New Zealand artists, and referred to the release of New Zealand film Sione's Wedding, which, she claimed, was damaged by unlawful distribution on the Internet.

On 16 October 2008, a press release was published by Tizard responding to "alarmist claims made by a small group of IT commentators in the media that recent amendments to the Copyright Act would have ISPs cutting off the accounts of their users based on unsubstantiated accusations of copyright infringement. [...] This is quiet [sic] simply untrue, and I am sure they know it." That press release seems to have been retracted.

On 23 March 2009, the Prime Minister John Key announced that the law would not take effect and would be re-written.

== Personal life ==
In 1993, aged 37, Tizard had a hysterectomy and surgery for uterine cancer from which she recovered.

== Notes ==
Political offices
Preceded by Jim Anderton	Minister of Consumer Affairs; 2002–2008	Succeeded by Heather Roy
New Zealand Parliament
Preceded by Sandra Lee	Member of Parliament for Auckland Central; 1996–2008	Succeeded by Nikki Kaye
Preceded by Bob Tizard	Member of Parliament for Panmure; 1990–1996	Constituency abolished
