= Leon Götz =

New Zealand politician (1892–1970)

The Honourable Sir Leon Götz KCVO
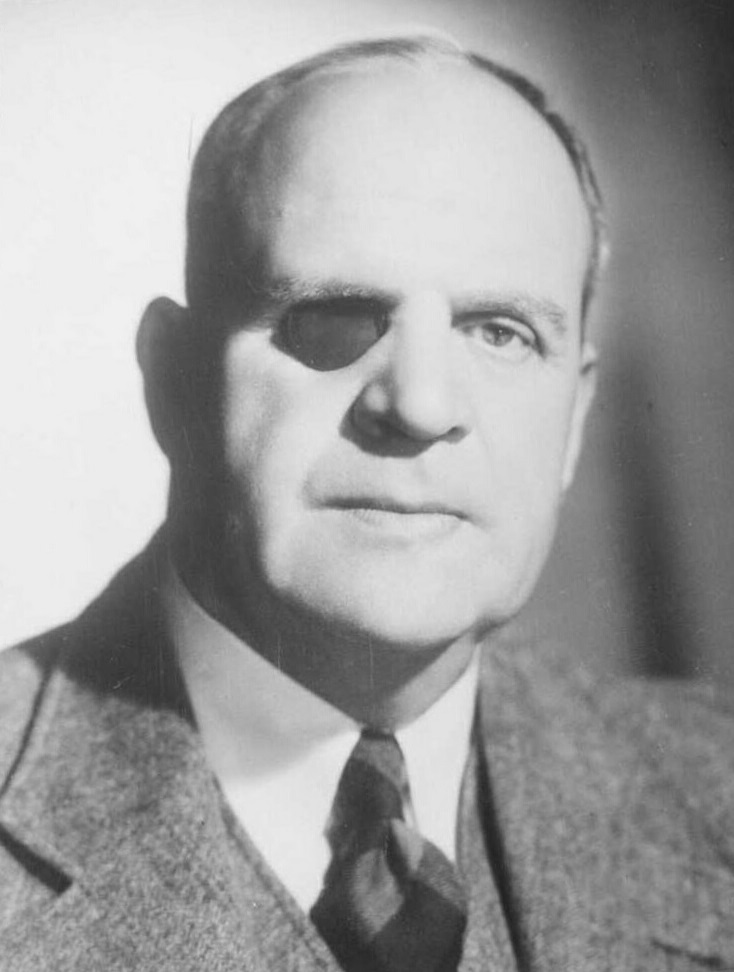
- Götz in 1957

9th High Commissioner of New Zealand to Canada
- In office 31 March 1965 – 30 August 1968
- Prime Minister: Keith Holyoake
- Preceded by: John S. Reid
- Succeeded by: Dean Eyre

17th Minister of Internal Affairs
- In office 12 December 1960 – 20 December 1963
- Prime Minister: Keith Holyoake
- Preceded by: Bill Anderton
- Succeeded by: David Seath

6th Minister of Island Territories
- In office 12 December 1960 – 20 December 1963
- Prime Minister: Keith Holyoake
- Preceded by: John Mathison
- Succeeded by: Ralph Hanan

Member of the New Zealand Parliament for Manukau
- In office 13 November 1954 – 30 November 1963
- Preceded by: New constituency
- Succeeded by: Colin Moyle

Member of the New Zealand Parliament for Otahuhu
- In office 30 November 1949 – 13 November 1954
- Preceded by: Charles Robert Petrie
- Succeeded by: James Deas

Personal details
- Born: 12 September 1892 Auckland, New Zealand
- Died: 14 September 1970 (aged 78) Rotorua, New Zealand
- Party: National
- Relatives: Enid McElwee (niece)
- Education: Otago University

Sir Frank Leon Aroha Götz KCVO (12 September 1892 – 14 September 1970) was a New Zealand politician of the National Party. Noted as a colourful character, he was commonly referred to by parliamentary colleagues as "the pirate" as he wore a black patch over a missing eye.

== Biography ==
=== Early life and career ===
Götz was born in Auckland. He received his education in France (at the insistence of his Alsatian father) and at King's College, Wanganui Collegiate School, and Otago University. He was a rubber planter in Malaya from 1913. He served in World War I in the Malayan States Rifles and in the RAF, and lost his right arm and eye in an explosives accident. He returned to Malaya, but came to New Zealand again in 1925 when the rubber market collapsed.

Until 1935, he was general manager of New Zealand reparation estates in Western Samoa. He was then a broadcaster for 2ZB, a radio station in Wellington. This was followed by working for an Auckland-based insurance company, of which he eventually became manager. He had also worked in journalism and advertising as well, due to being a fluent linguist, a teacher of multiple languages.

=== Political career ===
New Zealand Parliament
Years	Term	Electorate	Party
1949–1951	29th	Otahuhu	National
1951–1954	30th	Otahuhu	National
1954–1957	31st	Manukau	National
1957–1960	32nd	Manukau	National
1960–1963	33rd	Manukau	National

In 1946, Götz unsuccessfully contested Auckland Central, being beaten by Labour's Bill Anderton. He then sought the National Party nomination for the Mount Albert by-election in 1947, but lost to Jack Garland.

Götz then represented the Otahuhu electorate from 1949 to 1954. In 1953, he was awarded the Queen Elizabeth II Coronation Medal. He was then the MP for Manukau from 1954 to 1963. In 1963 he was defeated when standing for Manurewa. He was appointed Minister of Internal Affairs, Ministers for Civil Defence and Minister of Island Territories on 12 December 1960, and held these posts until his defeat three years later. He had been a backbencher for 11 years and was 68 years old, but Prime Minister Keith Holyoake thought him capable to be a minister despite Deputy Prime Minister Jack Marshall not thinking him qualified.

He had ministerial responsibility for acclimatisation (as the New Zealand Wildlife Service was a division of the Department of Internal Affairs) and was caught returning from a duck shooting trip by a local ranger carrying more than the legal limit allowed, causing significant embarrassment for the government.

As Internal Affairs was responsible for the 1963 Royal Tour, Götz was knighted at the end of the tour in 1963 by being appointed a Knight Commander of the Royal Victorian Order for personal services to the sovereign, which caused some jealousy amongst his colleagues. In March 1964, Götz was granted the right to retain the title of The Honourable in recognition of his term as a member of the Executive Council of New Zealand.

=== Later life and death ===
From 1965 to 1968 he was the High Commissioner to Canada. While there he occupied much of his time hunting bears near the Arctic Circle. When his term expired he retired to Rotorua. Götz died on 14 September 1970 in Rotorua. He was survived by his wife.

== Notes ==
Diplomatic posts
Preceded by John S. Reid	High Commissioner to Canada; 1965–1968	Succeeded by Dean Eyre
Political offices
Preceded by Bill Anderton	Minister of Internal Affairs; 1960–1963	Succeeded by David Seath
Preceded by John Mathison	Minister of Island Territories; 1960–1963	Succeeded by Ralph Hanan
New Zealand Parliament
Vacant Constituency recreated after abolition in 1938 Title last held by Arthur Osborne	Member of Parliament for Manukau; 1954–1963	Succeeded by Colin Moyle
Preceded by Charles Robert Petrie	Member of Parliament for Otahuhu; 1949–1954	Succeeded by James Deas
