= Panmure (electorate) =

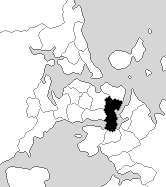
Panmure electorate boundaries between 1993 and 1996

Panmure is a former New Zealand parliamentary electorate in the southern suburbs of the city of Auckland, from 1984 to 1996. In the four parliamentary terms of its existence, it was first represented by Bob Tizard of the Labour Party, and then by his daughter Judith Tizard.

== Population centres ==
The 1981 census had shown that the North Island had experienced further population growth, and three additional general seats were created through the 1983 electoral redistribution, bringing the total number of electorates to 95. The South Island had, for the first time, experienced a population loss, but its number of general electorates was fixed at 25 since the 1967 electoral redistribution. More of the South Island population was moving to Christchurch, and two electorates were abolished, while two electorates were recreated. In the North Island, six electorates were newly created (including Panmure), three electorates were recreated, and six electorates were abolished. These changes came into effect with the 1984 election.

== History ==
Panmure was a safe electorate for the Labour Party. It was first held by Bob Tizard, who had first been elected in 1957 in Tamaki and who had since 1972 represented the Otahuhu electorate. Bob Tizard retired at the 1990 election and was succeeded by his daughter, Judith Tizard. At the 1987 election, she had stood in the Remuera electorate, where she got close to unseating National's Doug Graham.

When the Panmure electorate was abolished in 1996, Judith Tizard stood instead in Auckland Central.

=== Members of Parliament ===
Key

Labour

Election	Winner
1984 election	Bob Tizard
1987 election	Bob Tizard
1990 election	Judith Tizard
1993 election	Judith Tizard
(Electorate abolished in 1996; see Maungakiekie)

== Election results ==
=== 1993 election ===
1993 general election: Panmure
Party	Candidate	Votes	%	±%
Labour	Judith Tizard	8,028	52.14	+8.81
Alliance	Bruce Jesson	4,451	28.90	
National	Cushla Wren	2,238	14.53	
Christian Heritage	Barry Pepperell	250	1.62	
Natural Law	Raylene Lodge	130	0.84	
Majority		3,277	21.28	+14.38
Turnout		15,397	79.82	−0.24
Registered electors		19,289		

=== 1990 election ===
1990 general election: Panmure
Party	Candidate	Votes	%	±%
Labour	Judith Tizard	6,890	43.33	
National	Gray Bartlett	5,792	36.42	
NewLabour	Joce Jesson	1,480	9.30	
Green	Bryan Bennett	1,274	8.01	
Democrats	Joe Clark	221	1.38	
Social Credit	Harold Knox	136	0.85	
NZ Party	Clyde Johnson	75	0.47	
Communist League	Ruth Gray	33	0.20	
Majority		1,098	6.90	
Turnout		15,901	80.06	−0.80
Registered electors		19,859		

=== 1987 election ===
1987 general election: Panmure
Party	Candidate	Votes	%	±%
Labour	Bob Tizard	9,650	58.98	+2.37
National	T J C Elliot	5,403	33.02	
Democrats	Annamarie Clifford	1,306	7.98	
Majority		4,247	25.96	−6.66
Turnout		16,359	80.86	−8.44
Registered electors		20,229		

=== 1984 election ===
1984 general election: Panmure
Party	Candidate	Votes	%	±%
Labour	Bob Tizard	10,374	56.61	
National	Carolyn Tedesco	4,395	23.98	
NZ Party	Albert Orme	2,077	11.33	
Social Credit	Joe Clark	1,402	7.65	
Values	Joyce Claire Morse	77	0.42	
Majority		5,979	32.62	
Turnout		18,325	89.30	
Registered electors		20,519		
