= Heather Roy =

New Zealand politician (born 1964)

The Honourable Heather Roy
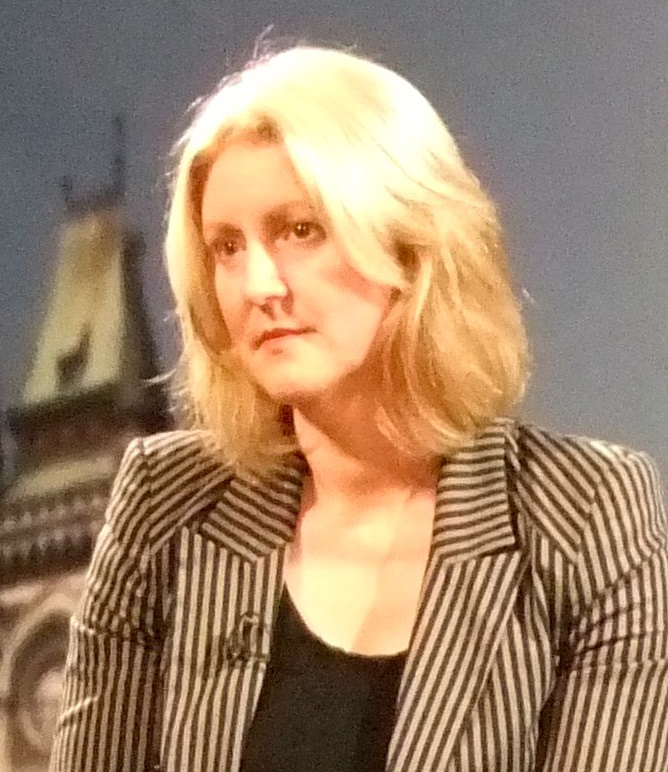

Minister of Consumer Affairs
- In office 19 November 2008 – 17 August 2010
- Prime Minister: John Key
- Preceded by: Judith Tizard
- Succeeded by: John Boscawen

Deputy Leader of ACT Party
- In office 2006–2010
- Leader: Rodney Hide
- Preceded by: Muriel Newman
- Succeeded by: John Boscawen

Member of the New Zealand Parliament for ACT Party List
- In office 2002–2011

Personal details
- Born: 5 March 1964 (age 62) Palmerston, Otago
- Party: ACT Party
- Spouse: Duncan Roy
- Children: 5
- Occupation: Physiotherapist, Member of Parliament, New Zealand Army Reserve

Heather Roy (born 5 March 1964) is a former New Zealand politician. She was a Member of Parliament for ACT New Zealand from 2002 until 2011.

Roy was the deputy leader of ACT New Zealand from 17 September 2005 to 17 August 2010. She was also Minister of Consumer Affairs in the John Key-led National Government from 19 November 2008 until 17 August 2010.

== Early life, career and family ==
Roy grew up in Palmerston, Otago as the eldest of six children. She was the deputy head girl and, later, head girl at her secondary school. She studied for a diploma in physiotherapy at Otago Polytechnic. She was introduced to politics in 1984 at the age of 20 when she met her husband Duncan Roy, who at that time was the New Zealand Party candidate for Awarua. The Roys have five children.

Before entering politics, Roy worked as a physiotherapist, medical research co-ordinator, manager of a private kindergarten and as publicity officer for the New Zealand Portrait Gallery. In 2006, she completed basic and corps training as a reserve forces field engineer (Royal New Zealand Engineers) within the New Zealand Army.

== Member of Parliament ==
New Zealand Parliament
Years	Term	Electorate	List	Party
2002–2005	47th	List	9	ACT
2005–2008	48th	List	2	ACT
2008–2011	49th	List	2	ACT

Roy first contested Parliament as a list-only candidate at the 1999 general election, where she was ranked 10th on the ACT New Zealand list. ACT only won enough support for nine MPs so Roy was unsuccessful.

=== In Opposition ===
At the 2002 general election, she contested the electorate of Ohariu-Belmont, where she finished fifth behind incumbent Peter Dunne. With an improved list position of 9 and ACT holding its support from the previous election, Roy was elected for the first time. In her maiden speech, Roy talked of her "fervent" belief in the liberal ideals of "freedom of market, of mind, and of body". In her first term, Roy was ACT spokesperson for ACC; arts, culture and heritage; family; health; internal affairs, occupational safety and health; senior citizens; women; and youth. She was also a member of Parliament's health select committee.

For the 2005 general election, Roy was placed second on the ACT party list, ahead of its deputy leader Muriel Newman. Roy contested but lost Ohariu-Belmont, and was re-elected on the party list. ACT only secured two positions in Parliament, so Roy became the party's deputy leader, whip, and national security spokesperson. For her second term, she served on the social services committee.

In the 2008 election, she contested the electorate of Wellington Central, a seat formerly held by former ACT leader and co-founder Richard Prebble from 1996 to 1999. The seat had been held by Labour since 1999, although the incumbent, Marian Hobbs, was retiring. Roy finished fourth but was re-elected to Parliament on the ACT party list for the third time.

=== Supporting the National-led government ===
In November 2008, National Party leader John Key formed a new government with support from ACT New Zealand and other small parties. As part of the National–ACT agreement, Roy was appointed as Minister of Consumer Affairs, Associate Minister of Defence and Associate Minister of Education. In the latter two roles, Roy commissioned reviews of the New Zealand Defence Force (including a study on voluntary national service) and of special education. She advocated for, without success, the reversal of New Zealand's nuclear free policy. She also announced reforms to independent schools, including increased government subsidies to independent schools in 2009. As Minister of Consumer Affairs, Roy launched a "consumer reform" discussion document in June 2010, approved the creation of New Zealand's first financial sector consumer dispute resolution schemes, and established new regulations requiring water efficiency labels to be fastened to electrical appliances including washing machines, dishwashers, taps, toilets and showers.

The 2008–2011 term saw dysfunction and disruption in the ACT New Zealand leadership. ACT founder Sir Roger Douglas, with Roy's support, was reported as leading unsuccessful moves to remove Epsom MP Rodney Hide as ACT leader in November 2009. At the ACT party conference in March 2010, Roy used her deputy leader's speech to criticise the party's reliance on Hide and the Epsom electorate. In August 2010, Roy was removed as deputy leader and replaced by John Boscawen. She was also removed as a government minister. In exit press, Roy denied being part of an attempt to replace Hide as leader. Less than twelve months later, in April 2011, Hide was succeeded as leader by Don Brash.

In June 2011, Roy announced she would leave Parliament at the 2011 general election. In her final year in office, she took charge of the Education (Freedom of Association) Amendment Bill, a private member's bill which had been in her name from 2005 to 2008 but was transferred to Sir Roger Douglas when Roy became a minister. The bill proposed to make membership of student associations and unions voluntary and faced strong opposition from student unions. The bill eventually passed its third reading in September 2011.

== Career after politics ==
Following the 2011 election, Roy was appointed non-executive board chair of the pharmaceutical lobby group, Medicines NZ. She left the role in early 2018.

Roy has appeared as a political commentator advocating for lowering the 5% threshold for parties to be represented in Parliament and for public opinion polls to be banned during the election voting period.
