= Ōtāhuhu (electorate) =

Electorate in Auckland, New Zealand

Map of boundaries at the 2026 general election

Ōtāhuhu, previously named Otahuhu, is a parliamentary electorate in the 2026 New Zealand general election. The electorate previously existed as an electorate in the southern suburbs of the city of Auckland, from 1938 to 1963, and then from 1972 to 1984.

== Population centres ==
The 1931 New Zealand census had been cancelled due to the Great Depression, so the 1937 electoral redistribution had to take ten years of population growth into account. The increasing population imbalance between the North and South Islands had slowed, and only one electorate seat was transferred from south to north. Five electorates were abolished, one former electorate (Onehunga) was re-established, and four electorates were created for the first time, including Otahuhu.

For the purposes of the country quota, the 1936 census had determined that some 30% of the population lived in urban areas, and the balance in rural areas. Since the 1969 election, the number of electorates in the South Island was fixed at 25, with continued faster population growth in the North Island leading to an increase in the number of general electorates. There were 84 electorates for the 1969 election, and the 1972 electoral redistribution saw three additional general seats created for the North Island, bringing the total number of electorates to 87. Together with increased urbanisation in Christchurch and Nelson, the changes proved very disruptive to existing electorates. In the South Island, three electorates were abolished, and three electorates were newly created. In the North Island, five electorates were abolished, two electorates were recreated (including Otahuhu), and six electorates were newly created.

The Otahuhu electorate was located in the south of Auckland. Settlements that fell into the initial Otahuhu electorate were Howick, Papatoetoe, Māngere, Manurewa, and Brookby.

The re-created 2026 electorate was pushed south-easterly from the prior Panmure-Ōtāhuhu electorate, and included the population centres of Ōtāhuhu, Middlemore, Ōtara, Clover Park and parts of Papatoetoe. Initial proposals included western Flat Bush, though this was changed after public consultation.

== History ==
The first representative, elected in 1938, was Charles Robert Petrie. In the previous parliamentary term, Petrie had represented the Hauraki electorate, which then had covered the South Auckland suburbs. Petrie retired in 1949.

In the 1963 general election the seat was abolished and Bob Tizard stood in Pakuranga, so only represented Otahuhu from 16 March (after a by-election due to the death of James Deas) to 29 October 1963. He later returned to the seat when it was reconstituted. When it was abolished in 1984, he stood in Panmure.

The electorate was re-created for the 2026 general election onwards to accommodate general population growth in South Auckland, with the preceding Panmure-Ōtāhuhu electorate losing the titular suburb of Panmure to Maungakiekie.

=== Members of Parliament ===
Key

Labour National

Election	Winner
1938 election	Charles Robert Petrie
1943 election	Charles Robert Petrie
1946 election	Charles Robert Petrie
1949 election	Leon Götz
1951 election	Leon Götz
1954 election	James Deas
1957 election	James Deas
1960 election	James Deas
1963 by-election	Bob Tizard
(Electorate abolished 1963–1972; see Pakuranga)
1972 election	Bob Tizard (2nd period)
1975 election	Bob Tizard (2nd period)
1978 election	Bob Tizard (2nd period)
1981 election	Bob Tizard (2nd period)
(Electorate abolished in 1984; see Panmure)
2026 election	Jenny Salesa

== Election results ==
=== 2026 election ===
The next election will be held on 7 November 2026. Candidates for Otahuhu are listed at Candidates in the 2026 New Zealand general election by electorate § Otahuhu. Official results will be available after 27 November 2026.

=== 1981 election ===
1981 general election: Otahuhu
Party	Candidate	Votes	%	±%
Labour	Bob Tizard	8,803	56.12	−0.98
National	Stuart McDowell	3,639	23.20	
Social Credit	Ken Harris	3,189	20.33	
Socialist Unity	Ella Ayo	54	0.34	+0.20
Majority		5,164	32.92	−2.35
Turnout		15,685	82.77	+25.17
Registered electors		18,950		

=== 1978 election ===
1978 general election: Otahuhu
Party	Candidate	Votes	%	±%
Labour	Bob Tizard	8,896	57.10	+1.30
National	Ray Ah Chee	4,134	26.53	
Social Credit	Ken Harris	2,288	14.68	
Values	I M Johnson	236	1.51	
Socialist Unity	Ella Ayo	23	0.14	
Majority		4,762	30.57	−6.68
Turnout		15,577	57.60	−19.10
Registered electors		27,041		

=== 1975 election ===
1975 general election: Otahuhu
Party	Candidate	Votes	%	±%
Labour	Bob Tizard	8,838	55.80	−12.55
National	Lois Morris	5,053	31.90	
Social Credit	Patrick Ford	1,020	6.44	
Values	Peter Johnston	879	5.54	
Socialist Unity	Barbara Miller	26	0.16	
Independent	Joseph Erwin Moosman	22	0.13	−0.25
Majority		3,785	23.89	−20.35
Turnout		15,838	76.70	−10.43
Registered electors		20,648		

=== 1972 election ===
1972 general election: Otahuhu
Party	Candidate	Votes	%	±%
Labour	Bob Tizard	9,891	68.35	
National	D C Brooker	3,488	24.10	
Social Credit	E R James	935	6.46	
New Democratic	Catherine Mary Langstone	101	0.69	
Independent	Joseph Erwin Moosman	56	0.38	
Majority		6,403	44.24	
Turnout		14,471	87.13	
Registered electors		16,608		

=== 1963 by-election ===
1963 Otahuhu by-election
Party	Candidate	Votes	%	±%
Labour	Bob Tizard	6,108	63.07	
National	Thomas Tucker	3,450	35.64	−3.69
Communist	Stan Hieatt	125	1.29	+0.60
Majority		2,658	27.45	
Turnout		9,683	51.10	−39.89
Registered electors		18,947		
Labour hold		Swing		

=== 1960 election ===
1960 general election: Otahuhu
Party	Candidate	Votes	%	±%
Labour	James Deas	9,247	56.19	−2.82
National	Thomas Tucker	6,473	39.33	
Social Credit	Allan Donovan	622	3.77	
Communist	Stan Hieatt	114	0.69	
Majority		2,774	16.85	−5.90
Turnout		16,456	90.99	−3.74
Registered electors		18,084		

=== 1957 election ===
1957 general election: Otahuhu
Party	Candidate	Votes	%	±%
Labour	James Deas	8,927	59.01	+7.15
National	Clive Haszard	5,485	36.26	
Social Credit	Frederick Coles Jordan	714	4.72	−0.84
Majority		3,442	22.75	+11.28
Turnout		15,126	94.73	+1.63
Registered electors		15,966		

=== 1954 election ===
1954 general election: Otahuhu
Party	Candidate	Votes	%	±%
Labour	James Deas	8,162	51.86	+8.04
National	Leonard Bradley	6,356	40.38	
Social Credit	Frederick Coles Jordan	875	5.56	
Independent	Rita Violet Fulljames	344	2.18	
Majority		1,806	11.47	
Turnout		15,737	93.10	+1.39
Registered electors		16,902		

=== 1951 election ===
1951 general election: Otahuhu
Party	Candidate	Votes	%	±%
National	Leon Götz	9,668	56.18	+2.13
Labour	James Deas	7,540	43.82	
Majority		2,128	12.36	+4.26
Turnout		17,208	91.71	−3.82
Registered electors		18,762		

=== 1949 election ===
1949 general election: Otahuhu
Party	Candidate	Votes	%	±%
National	Leon Götz	8,493	54.05	
Labour	Alex Dixon	7,218	45.95	
Majority		1,275	8.10	
Turnout		15,711	95.53	+1.35
Registered electors		16,445		

=== 1946 election ===
1946 general election: Otahuhu
Party	Candidate	Votes	%	±%
Labour	Charles Robert Petrie	6,957	50.81	+3.89
National	Albert Murdoch	6,737	49.19	
Majority		220	1.60	−1.88
Turnout		13,694	94.18	+5.24
Registered electors		14,539		

=== 1943 election ===
1943 general election: Otahuhu
Party	Candidate	Votes	%	±%
Labour	Charles Robert Petrie	6,251	46.92	−11.95
National	Gordon Hamilton	5,787	43.43	
Democratic Labour	Clare Jowsey	811	6.08	
Real Democracy	Cyril James Mahon	345	2.58	
Informal votes		128	0.96	+0.66
Majority		464	3.48	−15.53
Turnout		13,322	88.94	−4.82
Registered electors		14,977		

=== 1938 election ===
1938 general election: Otahuhu
Party	Candidate	Votes	%	±%
Labour	Charles Robert Petrie	7,020	58.87	
National	Kenneth Tennent	4,753	39.86	
Informal votes		36	0.30	
Majority		2,267	19.01	
Turnout		11,924	93.76	
Registered electors		12,717		
