= 1963 New Zealand bravery awards =

The 1963 New Zealand bravery awards were announced via a special honours list dated 21 May 1963, and posthumously recognised two police officers killed in the line of duty with the award of the Queen's Police Medal for Gallantry. Further bravery awards were also included in that year's New Year and Queen's Birthday Honours.

== Queen's Police Medal (QPM) ==
- Wallace Chalmers – detective inspector, New Zealand Police; of Auckland. Posthumous award.
- Neville Wilson Power – detective sergeant, New Zealand Police; of Te Atatū. Posthumous award.
