= National Development Act 1979 =

Act of Parliament in New Zealand

National Development Act

New Zealand Parliament

Legislative history
- Introduced by: Third National Government of New Zealand
- Passed: 1979

Related legislation
- National Development Act Repeal Act 1986; Resource Management Act 1991
- Status: Repealed

The National Development Act 1979 was an Act of Parliament in New Zealand. It was a controversial Act and was repealed by the National Development Act Repeal Act 1986.

== Background ==
To help speed up the Think Big initiative, the Third National Government of New Zealand passed the National Development Act in December 1979. The act, according to supporters, allowed the government to plan and act decisively and 'cut through red tape' to enable development. However, there was significance resistance to the act with concerns around the speed, secrecy and lack of public consultation. More particularly there was opposition to the lack of environmental safeguards for the utilisation of natural resources. The opposition to the act was led by the Coalition for Open Government which had been formed by Sir Guy Powles, the former Chief Ombudsman of New Zealand. There were 341 public submissions on the act and only 5 endorsed the act with all others being opposed. The Minister for National Development, Bill Birch, largely ignored the counterarguments but Prime Minister Robert Muldoon did make some minor amendments based on the submissions, notably a clause that allowed the Court of Appeal to consider government decisions made under the act. Critics were still unimpressed and three National MPs (Mike Minogue, Ian Shearer and Marilyn Waring) voted with the opposition against the bill, though it passed anyway. The act, and its part in enabling the controversial Think Big policy, reduced Muldoon and his governments popularity with its 'dogmatic arrogance of executive power'.

== See also ==
- Lists of acts of the New Zealand Parliament
- Resource Management Act 1991
- Environment of New Zealand
