= Arthur Hall (New Zealand politician) =

New Zealand politician (1880–1931)

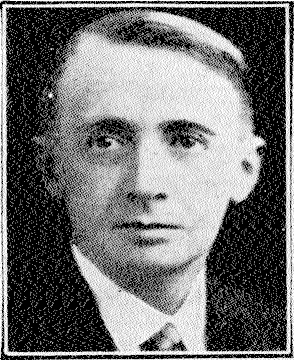

Arthur William Hall (3 August 1880 – 18 April 1931) was a New Zealand politician of the Reform Party and a farmer.

== Early life and interests ==
He was born in the Auckland suburb of One Tree Hill in 1880. He was the youngest son of Robert Hall of Remuera, who had been president of the Auckland A&P Association and chairman of the One Tree Hill Road Board. Hall Jr received his education at St John's College and then went farming at One Tree Hill, in the Waikato and then at Māngere. He settled in Papatoetoe in 1906 at the latest and had farms there and at East Tāmaki. His last residence in Papatoetoe was in St George Street.

A keen bowler, Hall chaired the Papatoetoe Bowling Club for two years during the 1910s. He was also the patron of the Papatoetoe Rugby League Football Club from 1929 to 1931.

== Political career ==
New Zealand Parliament
Years	Term	Electorate	Party
1928–1931	23rd	Hauraki	Reform

He served on the inaugural Papatoetoe Town Board from May 1919. From his second term, he was chairman of the town board until he entered parliament (i.e. six years). He was the representative of the Auckland Suburban Local Bodies on the Railway Advisory Board.

He represented the Hauraki electorate from 1928 to 1931 when he died in office.

== Family and death ==
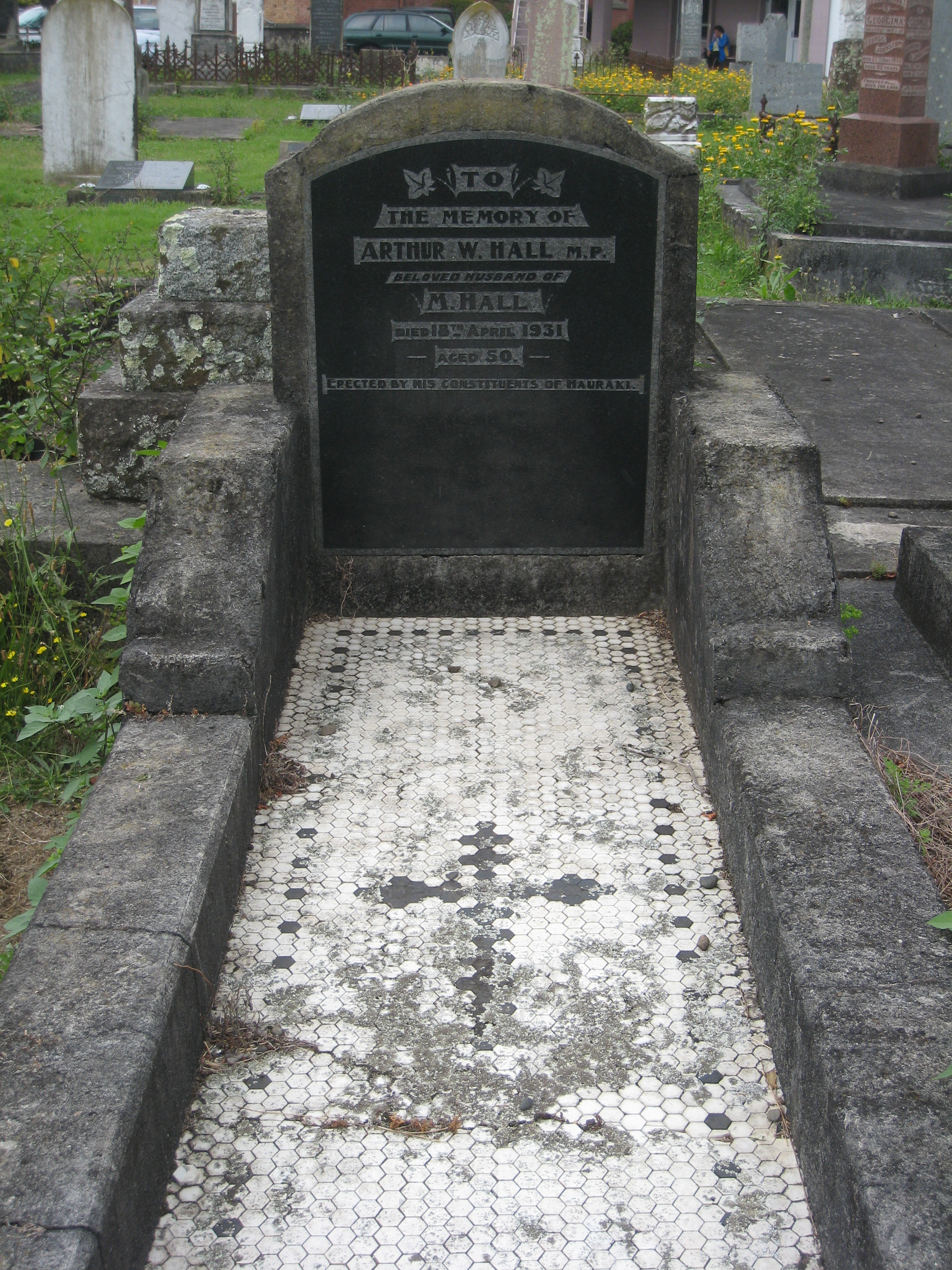
Arthur Hall's grave

Hall married Margaret Scott at her brother's residence at Paterangi (Waikato) on 18 April 1906.

He had an intracerebral hemorrhage on 16 April 1931 followed by emergency surgery in a Wellington hospital, but died in the early hours of 18 April at age 50. He was survived by his wife and their daughter. He was buried at Papatoetoe Presbyterian Cemetery, with the Hon. Arthur Stallworthy representing the prime minister at the funeral.

New Zealand Parliament
New constituency	Member of Parliament for Hauraki; 1928–1931	Succeeded by Walter William Massey
