= National Development Act Repeal Act 1986 =

Act of Parliament in New Zealand

National Development Act Repeal Act

New Zealand Parliament
- Long title: An Act to repeal the National Development Act 1979 and to make provision incidental thereto

Legislative history
- Introduced by: Fourth Labour Government of New Zealand
- Passed: 1986

Related legislation
- National Development Act 1979; Resource Management Act 1991
- Status: Current legislation

The National Development Act Repeal Act 1986 was an Act of Parliament in New Zealand that repealed the controversial National Development Act 1979.

== See also ==
- Lists of acts of the New Zealand Parliament
- Resource Management Act 1991
- Environment of New Zealand
