= Walter William Massey =

New Zealand politician (1882–1959)

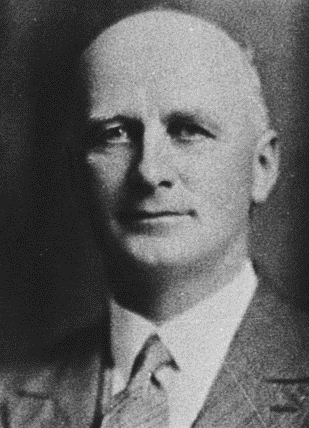
- Massey, c. 1931

Member of the New Zealand Parliament for Hauraki
- In office 1931–1935
- Preceded by: Arthur Hall
- Succeeded by: Charles Robert Petrie

Personal details
- Born: 28 January 1883; Māngere, Auckland, New Zealand
- Died: 8 November 1959 (aged 76); Auckland, New Zealand
- Resting place: Māngere Lawn Cemetery, Auckland, New Zealand
- Political party: Reform
- Spouse: Ruby Violet Longuet
- Parent(s): William Massey; Christina Paul
- Relatives: Jack Massey (brother)

New Zealand Parliament
Years	Term	Electorate	Party
1931	23rd	Hauraki	Reform
1931–1935	24th	Hauraki	Reform

Walter William Massey (28 January 1882 – 8 November 1959) was a New Zealand politician of the Reform Party.

He represented the Hauraki electorate from the 1931 by-election (after the death of Arthur Hall), to 1935 when he was defeated by Charles Robert Petrie of the Labour Party.

He was a son of Prime Minister William Massey, and brother of Jack Massey who represented the Franklin electorate.

In 1935, he was awarded the King George V Silver Jubilee Medal.

New Zealand Parliament
Preceded by Arthur Hall	Member of Parliament for Hauraki; 1931–1935	Succeeded by Charles Robert Petrie
