= Charles Robert Petrie =

New Zealand politician

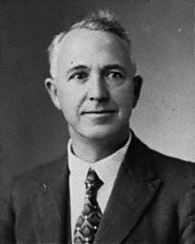

Member of the New Zealand Parliament for Otahuhu
- In office 15 October 1938 – 30 November 1949
- Preceded by: Seat established
- Succeeded by: Leon Götz

6th Mayor of Otahuhu
- In office 1935–1944
- Preceded by: Hubert Thomas Clements
- Succeeded by: Albert Murdoch

Personal details
- Born: 1882 Glasgow, Scotland
- Died: 6 October 1958 (aged 75–76) Ōtāhuhu, New Zealand
- Party: Labour
- Occupation: Shopkeeper

Charles Robert Petrie (1882 – 6 October 1958) was a New Zealand politician of the Labour Party.

== Biography ==
New Zealand Parliament
Years	Term	Electorate	Party
1935–1938	25th	Hauraki	Labour
1938–1943	26th	Otahuhu	Labour
1943–1946	27th	Otahuhu	Labour
1946–1949	28th	Otahuhu	Labour

Petrie was born in Glasgow, Scotland and arrived in New Zealand in 1911. He was an active Presbyterian.

A shopkeeper in Ōtāhuhu, he was first elected to the Otahuhu Borough Council in 1924, and served as mayor between 1935 and 1944.

Petrie unsuccessfully contested the Hauraki electorate in the 1931 election against Walter William Massey of the Reform Party. He represented the Hauraki electorate from 1935 to 1938, then the Otahuhu electorate from 1938 to 1949, when he retired.

In 1953, Peterson was awarded the Queen Elizabeth II Coronation Medal. He died in 1958 and was buried at Otahuhu Cemetery.

Petrie was the sole Labour Member of Parliament to represent the Hauraki electorate in its history.

== Notes ==
New Zealand Parliament
Preceded by Walter William Massey	Member of Parliament for Hauraki; 1935–1938	Succeeded by John Manchester Allen
New constituency	Member of Parliament for Otahuhu; 1938–1949	Succeeded by Leon Götz
Political offices
Preceded by Thomas Clements	Mayor of Otahuhu; 1935–1944	Succeeded by Albert Murdoch
