= Hauraki (general electorate) =

Hauraki is a former New Zealand parliamentary electorate, from 1928 to 1987 and 1993 to 1996. In the 1987 general election it was renamed Coromandel, the name that had been used from 1972 to 1981. In 1993 it reverted to Hauraki, but became Coromandel again for the first MMP election in 1996.

== Population centres ==
In the 1927 electoral redistribution, the North Island gained a further electorate from the South Island due to faster population growth. Five electorates were abolished, two former electorates were re-established, and three electorates, including Hauraki, were created for the first time. These changes came into effect with the 1928 election. In its original form, the Hauraki electorate extended from the Hauraki Plains up the coast to Auckland. Settlements that fell into the electorate were Howick, Papatoetoe, Māngere, Manurewa, Brookby, Meremere, Miranda, and Waitakaruru. In the 1937 electoral redistribution, the Hauraki electorate moved significantly south, losing all the South Auckland suburbs to the new Otahuhu electorate, and gaining Morrinsville.

In the 1946 electoral redistribution, the Hauraki electorate moved to the north-east, losing Morrinsville, but gaining Paeroa and most of the Coromandel Peninsula, including Thames, Whitianga, and Coromandel township.

The 1987 electoral redistribution took the continued population growth in the North Island into account, and two additional general electorates were created, bringing the total number of electorates to 97. In the South Island, the shift of population to Christchurch had continued. Overall, three electorates were newly created, three electorates were recreated, and four electorates were abolished (including Hauraki). All of those electorates were in the North Island. Changes in the South Island were restricted to boundary changes. These changes came into effect with the 1987 election.

== History ==
The electorate was represented by nine Members of Parliament. The first representative was Arthur Hall, who died in office on 18 April 1931. This caused the 1931 by-election, which was won by Walter William Massey.

In 1972 and 1987, the electorate was abolished and replaced with the Coromandel electorate.

=== Members of Parliament ===
Key

Reform Labour National

Election	Winner
1928 election	Arthur Hall
1931 by-election	Walter William Massey
1931 election	Walter William Massey
1935 election	Charles Robert Petrie
1938 election	John Manchester Allen
1942 by-election	Andy Sutherland
1943 election	Andy Sutherland
1946 election	Andy Sutherland
1949 election	Andy Sutherland
1951 election	Andy Sutherland
1954 election	Arthur Kinsella
1957 election	Arthur Kinsella
1960 election	Arthur Kinsella
1963 election	Arthur Kinsella
1966 election	Arthur Kinsella
1969 election	Leo Schultz
(Abolished 1972–1978; see Coromandel)
1978 election	Leo Schultz
1981 election	Graeme Lee
1984 election	Graeme Lee
{Abolished 1987–1993; see Coromandel)
1993 election	Warren Kyd
(Electorate abolished in 1996; see Coromandel)

The name Hauraki was used in 1999 for a Māori electorate; please refer to Hauraki Maori.

== Election results ==
=== 1993 election ===
1993 general election: Hauraki
Party	Candidate	Votes	%	±%
National	Warren Kyd	7,568	40.85	
Alliance	Jeanette Fitzsimons	5,698	30.75	
Labour	Rachel Garden	3,183	17.18	
NZ First	Sharon O'Flaherty	1,593	8.59	
Christian Heritage	Ross Jackson	289	1.55	
McGillicuddy Serious	Gregory Clive Smith	148	0.79	
Defence Movement	James Brian Boswell	47	0.25	
Majority		1,870	10.09	
Turnout		18,526	83.10	
Registered electors		22,291		

=== 1984 election ===
1984 general election: Hauraki
Party	Candidate	Votes	%	±%
National	Graeme Lee	9,070	43.9	−1.5
Social Credit	Alasdair Thompson	5,638	27.3	
Labour	Gary Taylor	4,653	22.5	
NZ Party	Peter Hepburn	1,227	5.9	
Values	Marion Donald	71	0.4	
Majority		3,432	16.6	+7.5
Turnout		22,607	93.2	+3.9

=== 1981 election ===
1981 general election: Hauraki
Party	Candidate	Votes	%	±%
National	Graeme Lee	8,996	45.4	
Social Credit	Gordon Miller	7,209	36.3	+3.1
Labour	Carl Jensen	3,636	18.3	
Majority		1,787	9.1	
Turnout		22,298	89.3	+19.2

=== 1978 election ===
1978 general election: Hauraki
Party	Candidate	Votes	%	±%
National	Leo Schultz	8,022	44.3	
Social Credit	Gordon Miller	6,003	33.2	
Labour	John Williams	3,668	20.3	
Values	Michael Fraser Donoghue	390	2.2	
Majority		2,019	11.1	
Turnout		25,876	70.1	

=== 1943 election ===
There were five candidates in 1943, with the election won by Andy Sutherland over Edmund Colin Nigel Robinson.

=== 1942 by-election ===
1942 Hauraki by-election
Party	Candidate	Votes	%	±%
National	Andy Sutherland	3,805	77.41	
Independent	Henry Thomas Head	1,082	22.01	
Informal votes		29	0.58	
Majority		2,723	55.39	
Turnout		4,916		
Registered electors				

=== 1935 election ===
1935 general election: Hauraki
Party	Candidate	Votes	%	±%
Labour	Charles Robert Petrie	5,325	45.37	+9.99
Reform	Walter Massey	4,781	40.74	−23.88
Democrat	Stanley Rickards	1,629	13.88	
Informal votes		75	0.63	−0.05
Majority		544	4.63	
Turnout		11,735	89.64	+10.41
Registered electors		13,090		

=== 1931 election ===
1931 general election: Hauraki
Party	Candidate	Votes	%	±%
Reform	Walter Massey	6,078	64.62	+15.15
Labour	Charles Robert Petrie	3,328	35.38	+3.42
Informal votes		64	0.68	
Majority		2,750	29.24	+11.73
Turnout		9,470	79.23	
Registered electors		11,953		

=== 1931 by-election ===
1931 Hauraki by-election
Party	Candidate	Votes	%	±%
Reform	Walter Massey	4,023	49.47	
Labour	Charles Robert Petrie	2,599	31.96	
United	Ebenezer Allan	997	12.26	−19.74
Country Party	Alexander Ross	513	6.31	
Majority		1,424	17.51	7.80
Turnout		8,132		

=== 1928 election ===
1928 general election: Hauraki
Party	Candidate	Votes	%	±%
Reform	Arthur Hall	3,826	41.71	
United	Ebenezer Allan	2,935	32.00	
Labour	Charles Robert Petrie	2,411	26.29	
Majority		891	9.71	
Informal votes		54	0.59	
Turnout		9,226	87.60	
Registered electors		10,532		
