= Minister of Internal Affairs (New Zealand) =

New Zealand minister of the Crown

Minister of Internal Affairs of New Zealand
- Coat of Arms of New Zealand

- Flag of New Zealand

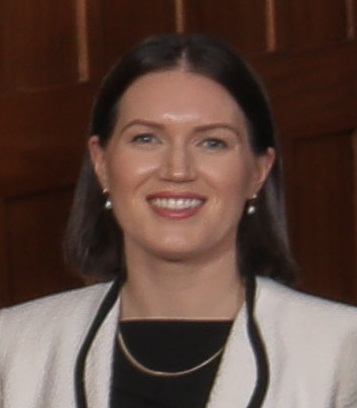
- Incumbent; Brooke van Velden since 27 November 2023
- Department of Internal Affairs
- Style: The Honourable
- Member of: Cabinet of New Zealand; Executive Council
- Reports to: Prime Minister of New Zealand
- Appointer: Governor-General of New Zealand
- Term length: At His Majesty's pleasure
- Formation: 6 January 1909
- First holder: John Findlay
- Salary: $288,900
- Website: www.beehive.govt.nz

The Minister of Internal Affairs is a minister in the New Zealand Government with responsibility over the Department of Internal Affairs. The position of Minister of Internal Affairs has existed since the Department of Internal Affairs replaced the Colonial Secretary's office from 19 November 1907. The responsibilities of the office have been progressively reduced as other ministerial roles have been spun-off from the Department of Internal Affairs. Today his or her remit includes internal security and administering applications for citizenship.

== List of ministers ==
The following ministers held the office of Minister of Internal Affairs.

Key

Liberal Reform United Labour National United
New Zealand First Mauri Pacific United Future ACT

No.	Name	Portrait	Term of Office		Prime Minister
1	John Findlay		19 November 1907	6 January 1909	Ward
2	David Buddo		6 January 1909	28 March 1912	Ward
3	George Russell		28 March 1912	10 July 1912	Mackenzie
4	Francis Bell		10 July 1912	12 August 1915	Massey
(3)	George Russell		12 August 1915	25 August 1919	Massey
5	John Bird Hine		4 September 1919	17 January 1920	Massey
(4)	Francis Bell		17 January 1920	14 May 1920	Massey
6	George James Anderson		17 May 1920	1 March 1921	Massey
7	William Downie Stewart Jr		1 March 1921	27 June 1923	Massey
8	Richard Bollard		27 June 1923	25 August 1927	Massey
8	Richard Bollard		27 June 1923	25 August 1927	Bell
8	Richard Bollard		27 June 1923	25 August 1927	Coates
9	Māui Pōmare		25 August 1927	10 December 1928	Coates
10	Philip De La Perrelle		10 December 1928	22 September 1931	Ward
10	Philip De La Perrelle		10 December 1928	22 September 1931	Forbes
11	Adam Hamilton		22 September 1931	28 January 1933	Forbes
12	Alexander Young		28 January 1933	6 December 1935	Forbes
13	Bill Parry		6 December 1935	13 December 1949	Savage
13	Bill Parry		6 December 1935	13 December 1949	Fraser
14	William Bodkin		13 December 1949	26 November 1954	Holland
15	Sid Smith		26 November 1954	12 December 1957	Holland
15	Sid Smith		26 November 1954	12 December 1957	Holyoake
16	Bill Anderton		12 December 1957	12 December 1960	Nash
17	Leon Götz		12 December 1960	20 December 1963	Holyoake
18	David Seath		20 December 1963	9 February 1972	Holyoake
19	Allan Highet		9 February 1972	8 December 1972	Marshall
20	Henry May		8 December 1972	12 December 1975	Kirk
20	Henry May		8 December 1972	12 December 1975	Rowling
(19)	Allan Highet		12 December 1975	26 July 1984	Muldoon
21	Peter Tapsell		26 July 1984	24 July 1987	Lange
22	Michael Bassett		24 July 1987	9 February 1990	Lange
22	Michael Bassett		24 July 1987	9 February 1990	Palmer
23	Margaret Austin		9 February 1990	2 November 1990	Palmer
23	Margaret Austin		9 February 1990	2 November 1990	Moore
24	Graeme Lee		2 November 1990	28 November 1993	Bolger
25	Warren Cooper		28 November 1993	29 February 1996	Bolger
26	Peter Dunne		29 February 1996	16 December 1996	Bolger
27	Jack Elder		16 December 1996	10 December 1999	Bolger
27	Jack Elder		16 December 1996	10 December 1999	Shipley
28	Mark Burton		10 December 1999	13 November 2000	Clark
29	George Hawkins		13 November 2000	19 October 2005	Clark
30	Rick Barker		19 October 2005	19 November 2008	Clark
31	Richard Worth		19 November 2008	2 June 2009	Key
32	Nathan Guy		16 June 2009	13 December 2011	Key
33	Amy Adams		14 December 2011	2 April 2012	Key
34	Chris Tremain		3 April 2012	27 January 2014	Key
(26)	Peter Dunne		28 January 2014	21 October 2017	Key
(26)	Peter Dunne		28 January 2014	21 October 2017	English
35	Tracey Martin		26 October 2017	6 November 2020	Ardern
36	Jan Tinetti		6 November 2020	1 February 2023	Ardern
36	Jan Tinetti		6 November 2020	1 February 2023	Hipkins
37	Barbara Edmonds		1 February 2023	27 November 2023	Hipkins
38	Brooke van Velden		27 November 2023	present	Luxon
