= Electoral history of Bill Rowling =

List of elections featuring Bill Rowling as a candidate

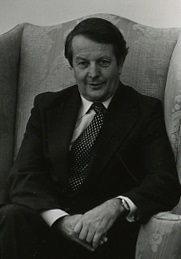
Bill Rowling in 1975

This is a summary of the electoral history of Bill Rowling, Prime Minister of New Zealand (1974–75), Leader of the Labour Party (1974–83), Member of Parliament for Buller (1962–72) and later Tasman (1972–84).

== Parliamentary elections ==
=== 1960 election ===
1960 general election: Fendalton
Party	Candidate	Votes	%	±%
National	Harry Lake	9,500	55.54	
Labour	Bill Rowling	6,778	39.62	
Social Credit	John Forster	826	4.82	
Majority		2,722	15.91	
Turnout		17,104	90.47	−2.90
Registered electors		18,904		

=== 1962 by-election ===
1962 Buller by-election
Party	Candidate	Votes	%	±%
Labour	Bill Rowling	5,242	44.98	
National	Ernie King	4,846	41.58	+5.58
Social Credit	P. H. Matthews	1,566	13.44	−1.36
Majority		396	3.40	
Informal votes		37	0.32	
Turnout		11,691	79.40	−12.70
Registered electors		14,724		
Labour hold		Swing		

=== 1963 election ===
General election, 1963: Buller
Party	Candidate	Votes	%	±%
Labour	Bill Rowling	7,338	52.28	+7.30
National	Ernie King	5,667	40.37	+1.21
Social Credit	E Wells	1,033	7.35	
Majority		1,671	11.90	+8.50
Turnout		14,038	90.91	+11.51
Registered electors		15,440		

=== 1966 election ===
General election, 1966: Buller
Party	Candidate	Votes	%	±%
Labour	Bill Rowling	6,510	48.36	−3.92
National	Ernie King	4,668	34.67	−5.70
Social Credit	W P B Dobier	2,286	16.97	
Majority		1,822	13.53	+1.63
Turnout		13,464	87.98	−2.93
Registered electors		15,303		

=== 1969 election ===
General election, 1969: Buller
Party	Candidate	Votes	%	±%
Labour	Bill Rowling	8,319	53.36	+5.00
National	Ernie King	5,497	35.25	+0.58
Social Credit	D L Hodgkinson	1,774	11.37	
Majority		2,822	18.10	+4.57
Turnout		15,590	87.67	−0.31
Registered electors		17,782		

=== 1972 election ===
General election, 1972: Tasman
Party	Candidate	Votes	%	±%
Labour	Bill Rowling	8,046	52.52	
National	Gerald Hunt	6,212	40.55	
Social Credit	John Brinsdon	882	5.75	
New Democratic	Gary Eggers	177	1.15	
Majority		1,834	11.97	
Turnout		15,317	89.57	
Registered electors		17,099		

=== 1975 election ===
General election, 1975: Tasman
Party	Candidate	Votes	%	±%
Labour	Bill Rowling	8,344	46.09	−6.43
National	Peter Malone	7,815	43.17	
Social Credit	Rudolph Muller	1,020	5.63	
Values	Patsy J. McGrath	693	3.82	
Independent	Adrian Hayter	238	1.31	
Majority		529	2.92	−9.05
Turnout		18,100	88.22	−1.35
Registered electors		20,516		

=== 1978 election ===
General election, 1978: Tasman
Party	Candidate	Votes	%	±%
Labour	Bill Rowling	8,973	49.08	+2.99
National	Ruth Richardson	7,179	39.27	
Social Credit	Rudolph Muller	1,726	9.44	+3.81
Values	Patsy J. McGrath	362	1.98	−1.84
Independent	Christopher Vine	40	0.21	
Majority		1,794	9.81	+6.18
Turnout		18,280	78.93	−9.29
Registered electors		23,159		

=== 1981 election ===
General election, 1981: Tasman
Party	Candidate	Votes	%	±%
Labour	Bill Rowling	8,803	41.57	−7.51
National	Edward Krammer	6,557	30.96	
Social Credit	Pat King	3,664	17.30	
Independent	Ken Waldron	99	0.46	
Majority		2,246	10.60	+0.79
Turnout		19,123	90.30	+11.37
Registered electors		21,176		

== Leadership elections ==
=== 1974 Leadership election ===
Candidate	Votes	%
Bill Rowling	44	83.01
Hugh Watt	9	16.99
Majority	35	66.03
Turnout	53	—

=== 1980 Leadership election ===
Candidate	Votes	%
Bill Rowling	19	51.40
David Lange	18	48.60
Majority	1	2.70
Turnout	37	—

== Party elections ==
=== 1966 Party Conference ===
1966 Vice-Presidential election; first ballot
Candidate	Votes	%
Bill Rowling	244	37.02%
Henry May	238	36.11%
Sir Basil Arthur	177	26.85%

1966 Vice-Presidential election; second ballot
Candidate	Votes	%
Henry May	321	50.23%
Bill Rowling	318	49.76%

=== 1967 Party Conference ===
1967 Vice-Presidential election
Candidate	Votes	%
Henry May	323	51.68%
Bill Rowling	302	48.32%

=== 1968 Party Conference ===
1968 Vice-Presidential election
Candidate	Votes	%
Henry May	334	50.22%
Bill Rowling	331	49.77%

=== 1969 Party Conference ===
1969 Presidential election
Candidate	Votes	%
Norman Douglas	380	56.80%
Bill Rowling	206	30.79%
George Webber	83	12.40%

1969 Vice-Presidential election
Candidate	Votes	%
Bill Rowling	422	64.71%
Henry May	212	31.03%
Sonja Davies	41	6.00%
George Spooner	6	0.87%
Ted Keating	2	0.29%
