= 1893 New Zealand Liberal Party leadership election =

- 28 April 1893
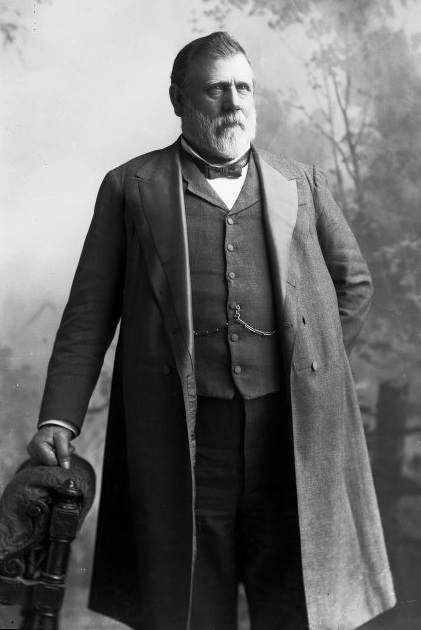

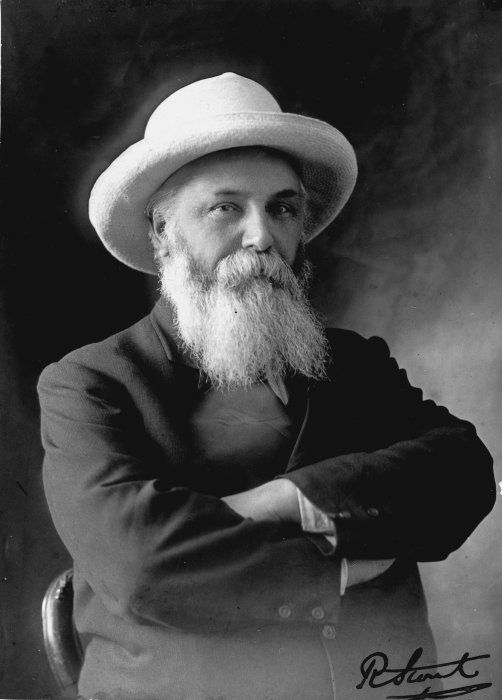
| Candidate | Richard Seddon | Robert Stout |
| Leader's seat | Westland | Inangahua |
| Popular vote | Unopposed | Did not stand |
Leader before election
John Ballance
Leader after election
Richard Seddon

The New Zealand Liberal Party leadership election 1893 was held to decide the second leader of the New Zealand Liberal Party. The position went to Westland MP and incumbent deputy leader Richard Seddon.

== Background ==
John Ballance underwent bowel surgery in 1893, but was clearly dying. He was visited by all of his cabinet members in the days before his death with the exception of Joseph Ward. Ballance eventually died on 27 April 1893 by which time the jostling for position had already started.

== Candidates ==
=== Richard Seddon ===
Seddon had been a Member of Parliament since 1879 and had been serving as Ballance's deputy since his appointment as Leader of the Opposition in 1889. Most saw him as Ballance's natural heir. Compared with many Liberal MPs, he was extremely popular with the masses; a desirable trait with an election looming.

=== Robert Stout ===
Ballance's preferred successor was said to have been Robert Stout his former colleague in the Grey and Stout-Vogel ministries. He asked Stout to return to parliament and be his successor. Stout agreed. As Stout was not an MP at the time of Ballance's death, he was never able to contest the leadership officially. Two cabinet members (John McKenzie and William Pember Reeves) favoured a postponement of the appointment of a new leader until Stout could be present. Stout re-entered parliament after a winning a by-election in Inangahua on 8 June 1893.

== Result ==
Seddon claimed the leadership (and therefore premiership) initially on an interim basis, as Ballance's deputy there was little opposition to this by cabinet. At a cabinet meeting on 28 April 1893 Seddon was confirmed as acting Premier. However, no formal leadership vote was held thereafter.

== Aftermath ==
Seddon would remain the leader of the Liberal Party until his own death in 1906. Stout continued to agitate against him. Seddon proved to be a popular figure with the masses and continued to lead the Liberals for a further 13 years until his death.
