= 1964 United States presidential election in Iowa =

- November 3, 1964

Nominee	Lyndon B. Johnson	Barry Goldwater
Party	Democratic	Republican
Home state	Texas	Arizona
Running mate	Hubert Humphrey	William E. Miller
Electoral vote	9	0
Popular vote	733,030	449,148
Percentage	61.88%	37.92%
County results
Johnson
50–60%
60–70%
70–80%
Goldwater
50–60%
60–70%
President before election
Lyndon B. Johnson
Democratic
Elected President
Lyndon B. Johnson
Democratic

The 1964 United States presidential election in Iowa took place on November 3, 1964, as part of the 1964 United States presidential election. Iowa voters chose nine representatives, or electors, to the Electoral College, who voted for president and vice president.

Iowa was won by incumbent President Lyndon B. Johnson (D–Texas), with 61.88% of the popular vote, against Senator Barry Goldwater (R–Arizona), with 37.92% of the popular vote. As of the 2024 presidential election, this is the last election in which Pottawattamie County, Plymouth County, Mahaska County, Mills County, Harrison County, Grundy County, Shelby County, Montgomery County, Fremont County, Ida County, and Osceola County voted for a Democratic presidential candidate. This was the first time since 1948 that the state would back a Democrat in a presidential election, and the last such occasion until 1988.

As of 2024, this remains the strongest performance by a Democrat in Iowa.

== Results ==
Presidential Candidate	Running Mate	Party	Electoral Vote (EV)	Popular Vote (PV)	
Lyndon B. Johnson	Hubert Humphrey	Democratic	9	733,030	61.88%
Barry Goldwater	William E. Miller	Republican	0	449,148	37.92%
E. Harold Munn	Mark A. Shaw	Prohibition	0	1,902	0.16%
Eric Hass	Henning Blomen	Socialist Labor	0	182	0.02%
Clifton DeBerry	Edward Shaw	Socialist Workers	0	159	0.01%
—	—	Write-ins	0	118	0.01%

=== Results by county ===
County	Lyndon B. Johnson Democratic		Barry Goldwater Republican		Various candidates Other parties		Margin		Total votes cast
County	#	%	#	%	#	%	#	%	Total votes cast
Adair	2,851	59.25%	1,953	40.59%	8	0.17%	898	18.66%	4,812
Adams	1,941	59.49%	1,321	40.48%	1	0.03%	620	19.01%	3,263
Allamakee	3,504	48.67%	3,691	51.26%	5	0.07%	-187	-2.59%	7,200
Appanoose	4,960	63.14%	2,872	36.56%	24	0.31%	2,088	26.58%	7,856
Audubon	3,011	61.64%	1,871	38.30%	3	0.06%	1,140	23.34%	4,885
Benton	6,614	65.59%	3,453	34.24%	17	0.17%	3,161	31.35%	10,084
Black Hawk	30,716	60.80%	19,744	39.08%	56	0.11%	10,972	21.72%	50,516
Boone	7,699	67.92%	3,543	31.26%	93	0.82%	4,156	36.66%	11,335
Bremer	5,045	56.44%	3,880	43.41%	14	0.16%	1,165	13.03%	8,939
Buchanan	5,621	63.71%	3,187	36.12%	15	0.17%	2,434	27.59%	8,823
Buena Vista	5,245	58.30%	3,747	41.65%	5	0.06%	1,498	16.65%	8,997
Butler	3,370	49.33%	3,462	50.67%	0	0.00%	-92	-1.34%	6,832
Calhoun	4,407	64.53%	2,422	35.47%	0	0.00%	1,985	29.06%	6,829
Carroll	7,807	76.49%	2,387	23.39%	13	0.13%	5,420	53.10%	10,207
Cass	4,006	48.87%	4,182	51.01%	10	0.12%	-176	-2.14%	8,198
Cedar	4,617	59.69%	3,106	40.16%	12	0.16%	1,511	19.53%	7,735
Cerro Gordo	13,156	62.44%	7,884	37.42%	31	0.15%	5,272	25.02%	21,071
Cherokee	4,336	57.62%	3,180	42.26%	9	0.12%	1,156	15.36%	7,525
Chickasaw	4,545	63.28%	2,632	36.65%	5	0.07%	1,913	26.63%	7,182
Clarke	2,659	63.13%	1,546	36.70%	7	0.17%	1,113	26.43%	4,212
Clay	4,631	59.76%	2,999	38.70%	119	1.54%	1,632	21.06%	7,749
Clayton	5,624	58.89%	3,923	41.08%	3	0.03%	1,701	17.81%	9,550
Clinton	14,267	63.32%	8,219	36.48%	47	0.21%	6,048	26.84%	22,533
Crawford	5,024	62.51%	2,999	37.31%	14	0.17%	2,025	25.20%	8,037
Dallas	7,447	66.13%	3,763	33.41%	52	0.46%	3,684	32.72%	11,262
Davis	2,966	67.38%	1,424	32.35%	12	0.27%	1,542	35.03%	4,402
Decatur	3,331	68.19%	1,542	31.57%	12	0.25%	1,789	36.62%	4,885
Delaware	4,623	57.32%	3,427	42.49%	15	0.19%	1,196	14.83%	8,065
Des Moines	13,894	70.31%	5,830	29.50%	38	0.19%	8,064	40.81%	19,762
Dickinson	3,490	58.77%	2,443	41.14%	5	0.08%	1,047	17.63%	5,938
Dubuque	23,695	70.06%	10,104	29.87%	24	0.07%	13,591	40.19%	33,823
Emmet	3,487	57.14%	2,611	42.78%	5	0.08%	876	14.36%	6,103
Fayette	6,900	55.28%	5,567	44.60%	15	0.12%	1,333	10.68%	12,482
Floyd	5,317	58.80%	3,721	41.15%	5	0.06%	1,596	17.65%	9,043
Franklin	3,582	59.10%	2,452	40.46%	27	0.45%	1,130	18.64%	6,061
Fremont	2,703	56.77%	2,044	42.93%	14	0.29%	659	13.84%	4,761
Greene	3,828	63.95%	2,141	35.77%	17	0.28%	1,687	28.18%	5,986
Grundy	3,582	52.61%	3,215	47.22%	11	0.16%	367	5.39%	6,808
Guthrie	3,962	64.46%	2,169	35.29%	15	0.24%	1,793	29.17%	6,146
Hamilton	5,195	62.35%	3,127	37.53%	10	0.12%	2,068	24.82%	8,332
Hancock	3,857	62.89%	2,269	37.00%	7	0.11%	1,588	25.89%	6,133
Hardin	5,459	58.67%	3,828	41.14%	17	0.18%	1,631	17.53%	9,304
Harrison	4,575	58.75%	3,203	41.13%	9	0.12%	1,372	17.62%	7,787
Henry	4,223	56.44%	3,247	43.40%	12	0.16%	976	13.04%	7,482
Howard	3,841	61.84%	2,360	38.00%	10	0.16%	1,481	23.84%	6,211
Humboldt	3,376	59.96%	2,250	39.96%	4	0.07%	1,126	20.00%	5,630
Ida	2,905	59.48%	1,977	40.48%	2	0.04%	928	19.00%	4,884
Iowa	4,261	60.00%	2,828	39.82%	13	0.18%	1,433	20.18%	7,102
Jackson	5,130	62.52%	3,066	37.37%	9	0.11%	2,064	25.15%	8,205
Jasper	10,216	65.65%	5,321	34.19%	24	0.15%	4,895	31.46%	15,561
Jefferson	4,135	59.79%	2,755	39.84%	26	0.38%	1,380	19.95%	6,916
Johnson	14,717	68.08%	6,860	31.73%	41	0.19%	7,857	36.35%	21,618
Jones	5,511	63.55%	3,154	36.37%	7	0.08%	2,357	27.18%	8,672
Keokuk	4,790	64.69%	2,597	35.08%	17	0.23%	2,193	29.61%	7,404
Kossuth	6,893	64.58%	3,776	35.38%	5	0.05%	3,117	29.20%	10,674
Lee	12,244	65.89%	6,321	34.02%	17	0.09%	5,923	31.87%	18,582
Linn	40,106	64.66%	21,845	35.22%	78	0.13%	18,261	29.44%	62,029
Louisa	2,624	58.56%	1,845	41.17%	12	0.27%	779	17.39%	4,481
Lucas	3,310	62.93%	1,935	36.79%	15	0.29%	1,375	26.14%	5,260
Lyon	2,747	46.28%	3,185	53.66%	3	0.05%	-438	-7.38%	5,935
Madison	3,518	60.87%	2,250	38.93%	12	0.21%	1,268	21.94%	5,780
Mahaska	6,396	62.68%	3,787	37.11%	22	0.22%	2,609	25.57%	10,205
Marion	7,911	66.80%	3,903	32.96%	28	0.24%	4,008	33.84%	11,842
Marshall	9,815	60.68%	6,323	39.09%	38	0.23%	3,492	21.59%	16,176
Mills	2,463	50.38%	2,424	49.58%	2	0.04%	39	0.80%	4,889
Mitchell	3,868	60.69%	2,489	39.06%	16	0.25%	1,379	21.63%	6,373
Monona	3,971	64.18%	2,208	35.69%	8	0.13%	1,763	28.49%	6,187
Monroe	3,186	66.50%	1,588	33.15%	17	0.35%	1,598	33.35%	4,791
Montgomery	3,489	52.86%	3,101	46.98%	11	0.17%	388	5.88%	6,601
Muscatine	8,020	59.07%	5,547	40.86%	10	0.07%	2,473	18.21%	13,577
O'Brien	4,295	49.73%	4,336	50.20%	6	0.07%	-41	-0.47%	8,637
Osceola	2,498	58.08%	1,798	41.80%	5	0.12%	700	16.28%	4,301
Page	4,402	47.80%	4,775	51.85%	32	0.35%	-373	-4.05%	9,209
Palo Alto	4,441	66.81%	2,206	33.19%	0	0.00%	2,235	33.62%	6,647
Plymouth	5,691	53.62%	4,920	46.36%	2	0.02%	771	7.26%	10,613
Pocahontas	3,988	65.68%	2,079	34.24%	5	0.08%	1,909	31.44%	6,072
Polk	74,194	66.27%	37,280	33.30%	479	0.43%	36,914	32.97%	111,953
Pottawattamie	17,569	55.25%	14,208	44.68%	22	0.07%	3,361	10.57%	31,799
Poweshiek	5,213	62.55%	3,109	37.31%	12	0.14%	2,104	25.24%	8,334
Ringgold	2,260	58.85%	1,571	40.91%	9	0.23%	689	17.94%	3,840
Sac	4,358	59.68%	2,937	40.22%	7	0.10%	1,421	19.46%	7,302
Scott	31,526	61.70%	19,488	38.14%	84	0.16%	12,038	23.56%	51,098
Shelby	4,148	58.12%	2,928	41.03%	61	0.85%	1,220	17.09%	7,137
Sioux	4,233	34.35%	8,078	65.55%	12	0.10%	-3,845	-31.20%	12,323
Story	12,329	59.82%	8,188	39.73%	93	0.45%	4,141	20.09%	20,610
Tama	6,057	63.04%	3,543	36.88%	8	0.08%	2,514	26.16%	9,608
Taylor	2,780	56.25%	2,162	43.75%	0	0.00%	618	12.50%	4,942
Union	3,751	59.89%	2,502	39.95%	10	0.16%	1,249	19.94%	6,263
Van Buren	2,555	60.02%	1,700	39.93%	2	0.05%	855	20.09%	4,257
Wapello	13,971	71.48%	5,524	28.26%	51	0.26%	8,447	43.22%	19,546
Warren	6,639	64.14%	3,679	35.54%	33	0.32%	2,960	28.60%	10,351
Washington	4,587	57.92%	3,315	41.86%	17	0.21%	1,272	16.06%	7,919
Wayne	3,062	60.49%	1,994	39.39%	6	0.12%	1,068	21.10%	5,062
Webster	13,005	66.23%	6,576	33.49%	54	0.28%	6,429	32.74%	19,635
Winnebago	3,677	61.11%	2,331	38.74%	9	0.15%	1,346	22.37%	6,017
Winneshiek	5,811	59.55%	3,941	40.38%	7	0.07%	1,870	19.17%	9,759
Woodbury	26,841	60.70%	17,347	39.23%	30	0.07%	9,494	21.47%	44,218
Worth	2,936	62.16%	1,777	37.62%	10	0.21%	1,159	24.54%	4,723
Wright	4,998	63.78%	2,831	36.13%	7	0.09%	2,167	27.65%	7,836
Totals	733,030	61.88%	449,148	37.92%	2,361	0.20%	283,882	23.96%	1,184,539

==== Counties that flipped from Republican to Democratic ====
- Adair
- Adams
- Appanoose
- Audubon
- Benton
- Black Hawk
- Boone
- Bremer
- Buchanan
- Buena Vista
- Calhoun
- Cerro Gordo
- Cedar
- Cherokee
- Clarke
- Clay
- Clayton
- Clinton
- Crawford
- Decatur
- Dallas
- Decatur
- Delaware
- Dickinson
- Emmet
- Fayette
- Floyd
- Franklin
- Fremont
- Greene
- Guthrie
- Hamilton
- Hancock
- Hardin
- Harrison
- Henry
- Des Moines
- Humboldt
- Ida
- Iowa
- Jackson
- Jasper
- Jefferson
- Jones
- Keokuk
- Kossuth
- Lee
- Linn
- Lousia
- Lucas
- Madison
- Mahaska
- Marion
- Marshall
- Mills
- Mitchell
- Monona
- Montgomery
- Muscatine
- Osceola
- Johnson
- Monroe
- Polk
- Plymouth
- Pocahontas
- Pottawattamie
- Poweshiek
- Ringgold
- Sac
- Scott
- Shelby
- Story
- Tama
- Taylor
- Union
- Van Buren
- Warren
- Washington
- Wayne
- Webster
- Winnebago
- Winneshiek
- Woodbury
- Worth
- Wright

== See also ==
- United States presidential elections in Iowa
