= 1980 Labour Party leadership election =

Labour Party leadership elections were held in the following countries in 1980:

- 1980 Labour Party leadership election (UK)
- 1980 New Zealand Labour Party leadership election
