= John Moorfield =

Māori language academic

John Moorfield QSO
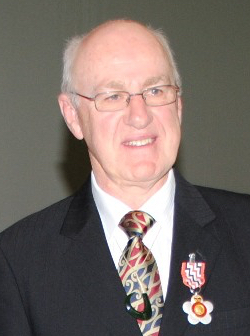
- Moorfield in 2010
- Born: John Cornelius Moorfield; 18 October 1943; Huntly, New Zealand
- Died: 19 May 2018 (aged 74)
- Other name: Te Murumāra
- Scientific career
- Fields: Māori language
- Workplaces: University of Waikato; University of Otago; Auckland University of Technology

John Cornelius Moorfield QSO (18 October 1943 – 19 May 2018), also known as Te Murumāra, was a New Zealand academic whose expertise was in the teaching of the Māori language. His work, including the publication of resources for learners of the language, contributed to the language's revitalisation. Since his death the eponymous Te Murumāra Foundation continues his work of Māori language education.

== Early life and education ==
Born at Huntly Hospital on 18 October 1943, and raised in Te Kauwhata, Moorfield was the son of Moya Ella Winifred Moorfield (née Walker) and her husband Robert Peter Moorfield. Despite being Pākehā (a New Zealander of European descent), he was educated at St Stephen's School—a Māori boys' boarding school at Bombay, south of Auckland—where his teachers included Hoani Waititi. Moorfield became captivated by the Māori language, and went on to study at the University of Auckland, and he was one of the first students to complete a Bachelor of Arts majoring in Māori language.

After graduating from Auckland, Moorfield went to Auckland Secondary Teachers' College in 1967 to train as a schoolteacher, and began his quest for an effective method of teaching the Māori language.

In 1984, Moorfield completed a Master of Education at the University College of Wales, Aberystwyth, where his thesis was titled, An analysis of the bilingual method: theoretical and practical considerations. In 1998, he earned a Doctor of Literature degree from the University of Otago, based on his body of work of textbooks and resources for adult learners of the Māori language.

== Career ==
After leaving teachers' college, Moorfield taught at Ngaruawahia High School, Wesley College, and Tuakau College, secondary schools in the Waikato and South Auckland.

Moorfield was appointed to the staff of the University of Waikato in 1976, working and teaching alongside Tīmoti Kāretu, Te Wharehuia Milroy and Hirini Melbourne. Concerned at the inadequacy of available resource material to support the teaching of the Māori language to adult students, Moorfield set about compiling audio resources and writing appropriate books. The resulting Te Whanake series of resources and textbooks has been recognised internationally as a model for minority language education programmes. At Waikato, Moorfield was also responsible for the establishment of the first Māori-medium undergraduate degree programme.

After 21 years at Waikato, Moorfield moved to the University of Otago in 1997, and his Te Whanake system for Māori language learning was implemented at all levels. There he began collaborating with Tania Ka'ai, and in 2007 both Moorfield and Ka'ai moved to Auckland University of Technology to take professorships in Māori innovation and development. Notable doctoral students of Moorfield's include Hana O'Regan.

In 2005, Moorfield published a Māori–English dictionary entitled Te Aka (meaning "The Vine"), which is available both in print and online.

Moorfield died of cancer on 19 May 2018.

== Honours ==
In the 2010 Queen's Birthday Honours, Moorfield was appointed a Companion of the Queen's Service Order, for services to Māori language education.

== Publications ==
Published works by Moorfield include:

- Moorfield, John C. (2000). Nga Kupu me nga Tikanga. Auckland: Longman. ISBN 978-0582542556.
- —— (2001). Te Pihinga (2nd ed.). Auckland: Longman. ISBN 0-582-54327-4.
- —— (2002). Te Kākano: Pukapuka Tātaki = Study Guide (2nd ed.). Auckland: Longman. ISBN 9780582545458.
- —— (2004). Te Kōhure (2nd ed.). Auckland: Pearson Education New Zealand. ISBN 9780582545199.
- —— (2005). Te Aka: Māori-English, English-Māori Dictionary and Index. Auckland: Pearson Education. ISBN 978-0582548367.
