= Tasman (New Zealand electorate) =

Tasman is a former New Zealand parliamentary electorate, from 1972 to 1996.

== Population centres ==
Since the 1969 election, the number of electorates in the South Island was fixed at 25, with continued faster population growth in the North Island leading to an increase in the number of general electorates. There were 84 electorates for the 1969 election, and the 1972 electoral redistribution saw three additional general seats created for the North Island, bringing the total number of electorates to 87. Together with increased urbanisation in Christchurch and Nelson, the changes proved very disruptive to existing electorates. In the South Island, three electorates were abolished, and three electorates were newly created (including Tasman). In the North Island, five electorates were abolished, two electorates were recreated, and six electorates were newly created. The Tasman and West Coast electorates replaced the former Buller and Westland electorates in 1972.

Population centres of the original Tasman electorate were Collingwood, Tākaka, Motueka, Richmond, Havelock, Picton, Owen River, Murchison, Saint Arnaud, and Springs Junction. In the 1977 electoral redistribution, the city of Nelson had experienced population growth and many of the Nelson suburbs were transferred from the Nelson electorate to the Tasman electorate. To compensate for this, Springs Junction went to the West Coast electorate, and Picton was transferred to the Marlborough electorate. There were only minor boundary changes through the 1983 electoral redistribution. In the 1987 electoral redistribution, the remaining area of the Marlborough Sounds including Havelock transferred to the Marlborough electorate.

== History ==
Labour's Bill Rowling had represented the Buller electorate since the 1962 Buller by-election and when Buller was abolished in 1972, Rowling transferred to the Tasman electorate. Rowling was leader of the Labour Party from 1974 to 1983, and was Prime Minister at the beginning of that period (September 1974 – December 1975) while representing Tasman. After Rowling lost a Labour leadership challenge by David Lange in 1983, he retired at the 1984 election and was succeeded by Ken Shirley in the Tasman electorate. Shirley was defeated in 1990 by Nick Smith of the National Party.

In 1996, the first mixed-member proportional (MMP) election, the electorate was combined with the West Coast electorate to form the West Coast-Tasman electorate. At that time, Smith transferred to the Nelson electorate.

=== Members of Parliament ===
Key

Labour National

Election	Winner
1972 election	Bill Rowling
1975 election	Bill Rowling
1978 election	Bill Rowling
1981 election	Bill Rowling
1984 election	Ken Shirley
1987 election	Ken Shirley
1990 election	Nick Smith
1993 election	Nick Smith
(Electorate abolished 1996; see West Coast-Tasman)

== Election results ==
=== 1993 election ===
1993 general election: Tasman
Party	Candidate	Votes	%	±%
National	Nick Smith	11,017	51.14	+1.07
Labour	Geoff Rowling	6,958	32.30	
Alliance	Peter Radford	2,539	11.78	
NZ First	Allen Maisey	461	2.14	
Christian Heritage	Klaas van Maanen	235	1.09	
McGillicuddy Serious	Grant Knowles	149	0.69	−0.35
Independent	Steve Richards	80	0.37	
Natural Law	Mark Rayner	76	0.35	
Independent	Ken Waldron	25	0.11	−0.22
Majority		4,059	18.84	+8.07
Turnout		21,540	86.29	−0.39
Registered electors		24,962		

=== 1990 election ===
1990 general election: Tasman
Party	Candidate	Votes	%	±%
National	Nick Smith	10,440	50.07	
Labour	Ken Shirley	8,194	39.29	−11.47
Green	Henry James	1,091	5.23	
NewLabour	Paul Mustow	704	3.37	
Social Credit	Charlene Gazzard	159	0.76	
Democrats	Bob Paget	120	0.57	
McGillicuddy Serious	Grant Knowles	72	0.34	
Independent	Ken Waldron	70	0.33	+0.12
Majority		2,246	10.77	
Turnout		20,850	86.68	−2.56
Registered electors		24,052		

=== 1987 election ===
1987 general election: Tasman
Party	Candidate	Votes	%	±%
Labour	Ken Shirley	10,262	50.76	+4.37
National	Gerald Hunt	9,250	45.76	+8.39
Democrats	Rudolf Muller	453	2.24	
Independent	Hugh Monahan	105	0.51	
Values	Philip Lister	99	0.48	
Independent	Ken Waldron	44	0.21	−0.14
Majority		1,012	5.00	−4.01
Turnout		20,213	89.24	−1.78
Registered electors		22,648		

=== 1984 election ===
1984 general election: Tasman
Party	Candidate	Votes	%	±%
Labour	Ken Shirley	9,543	46.39	
National	Gerald Hunt	7,689	37.37	
NZ Party	Adrian Hayter	1,714	8.33	
Social Credit	Pat King	1,551	7.53	−9.77
Independent	Ken Waldron	74	0.35	−0.11
Majority		1,854	9.01	
Turnout		20,571	91.02	+0.72
Registered electors		22,599		

=== 1981 election ===
1981 general election: Tasman
Party	Candidate	Votes	%	±%
Labour	Bill Rowling	8,803	41.57	−7.51
National	Ted Krammer	6,557	30.96	
Social Credit	Pat King	3,664	17.30	
Independent	Ken Waldron	99	0.46	
Majority		2,246	10.60	+0.79
Turnout		19,123	90.30	+11.37
Registered electors		21,176		

=== 1978 election ===
1978 general election: Tasman
Party	Candidate	Votes	%	±%
Labour	Bill Rowling	8,973	49.08	+2.99
National	Ruth Richardson	7,179	39.27	
Social Credit	Rudolf Muller	1,726	9.44	+3.81
Values	Patsy J. McGrath	362	1.98	−1.84
Independent	Christopher Vine	40	0.21	
Majority		1,794	9.81	+6.18
Turnout		18,280	78.93	−9.29
Registered electors		23,159		

=== 1975 election ===
1975 general election: Tasman
Party	Candidate	Votes	%	±%
Labour	Bill Rowling	8,344	46.09	−6.43
National	Peter Malone	7,815	43.17	
Social Credit	Rudolf Muller	1,020	5.63	
Values	Patsy J. McGrath	693	3.82	
Independent	Adrian Hayter	238	1.31	
Majority		529	2.92	−9.05
Turnout		18,100	88.22	−1.35
Registered electors		20,516		

=== 1972 election ===
1972 general election: Tasman
Party	Candidate	Votes	%	±%
Labour	Bill Rowling	8,046	52.52	
National	Gerald Hunt	6,212	40.55	
Social Credit	John Brinsdon	882	5.75	
New Democratic	Gary Eggers	177	1.15	
Majority		1,834	11.97	
Turnout		15,317	89.57	
Registered electors		17,099		
