= Ngaruawahia High School =

Location
- 56 Kent Street, Ngāruawāhia. New Zealand; Waikato; 3720; New Zealand; 37.660450°S 175.158588°E

Information
- Type: State Co-educational Secondary School
- Motto: Wahia Nga Rua
- Founded: 1963
- Ministry of Education Institution no.: 127
- Principal: Rebecca Hodgson
- Gender: Co-Ed
- International students: 3
- Hours in school day: 8:45 am – 2:40 pm
- Houses: Haunui, Te-Matua -o-Maui, Marumaru-Atua, Hinemoana
- Color: Green/Black/White/Purple
- Sports: Rugby, Basketball, Volleyball, Hockey and Netball
- Socio-economic decile: 2D
- Website: ngaruawahiahigh.school.nz

Ngaruawahia High School (often abbreviated NHS) is a state co-educational school situated in Ngāruawāhia, New Zealand. The school was opened in 1963 and the current principal is Rebecca Hodgson. Mr. Chris Jarnet retired at the end of 2022.

The school typically hosts a Year 9–13 roll which fluctuates between 150 and 250 students each year and also provides learning opportunities to adult students.

== Enrolment ==
As of July 2026, Ngaruawahia High School has a roll of 356 students, of which 226 (63.5%) identify as Māori.

As of 2026, the school has an Equity Index of 534, placing it amongst schools whose students have the most socioeconomic barriers to achievement (roughly equivalent to deciles 1 and 2 under the former socio-economic decile system).

== Academic ==
The school offers NCEA courses to senior students and allows some students to study certain subjects by enrolling with The Correspondence School. The school is also affiliated with foreign student exchange programs. Ngaruawahia High School has signed up to the Te Kotahitanga programme, intended to improve the academic performance of Maori students.

== Sports ==
The New Zealand football club Ngaruawahia United was formed in 1968 and is made up primarily of the teenagers attending the secondary school.

== Ngaruawahia regatta ==
The school embraces the local regatta, a traditional perseverance of New Zealand's history and Māori culture. An event is held every year in March on the Waikato River.

== Controversies ==
In March 2010, a 14-year-old student at the school, Bronwyn Ormbsy-Ward, was assaulted by at least three girls. The attack happened outside school grounds, and video footage was wildly circulated. After viewing the footage, Bronwyn's mother laid a complaint with police. In August 2011, a 17-year-old and her friend were refused use of school toilets at interval, after finding all other toilets in the school locked. They were also denied use of staff room toilets. Upon returning to the staff room to 'beg' to use the toilets, they were told "there's a bush out there." Principal Robyn Roa, who introduced the strict policy, later apologised. The girl's mother, who is writing a complaint to the school's board, said that an apology was not enough, calling the staff 'immature' and 'pathetic'.

== Recent history ==
- In 2011, mainly in response to the attack of former student Bronwyn Ormbsy-Ward, of which a video was widely circulated, principal Robyn Roa introduced a ban on all electronic devices, which includes cellphones and iPods. She also said the prevalence of violence among young girls was a worrying trend and was unsure whether it was because they were prone to gossip or whether it was a cultural shift.
- In 2014, it was reported that the school would replace traditional classrooms with a modern approach to education in an attempt to "restore the school's once glowing reputation".

== Notable staff ==
- John Moorfield – Māori language academic

== Notable alumni ==
- Shaun Kenny-Dowall – Sydney Roosters and New Zealand national rugby league team
- Jacinda MacDonald – Royal NZ Army Medical Corps, member of the New Zealand Order of Merit
