= William Cowlishaw =

New Zealand cricketer

Personal information
- Full name: William Patten Cowlishaw
- Born: 1 November 1839; Sydney, Australia
- Died: 27 March 1903 (aged 63); Christchurch, New Zealand
- Source: Cricinfo, 15 October 2020

William Patten Cowlishaw (1 November 1839 – 27 March 1903) was a New Zealand barrister, provincial politician, and cricketer.

Born in Sydney on 1 November 1839, he graduated Master of Arts from the University of Sydney. He received his legal training with Rowley, Holdsworth, and Garrick, and was admitted to the bar in 1863. He visited Canterbury in New Zealand from June 1863. He soon returned to New Zealand and went into partnership with E. F. B. Harston in August 1863. Then, Garrick also moved to Christchurch and joined the partnership, and they soon bought out Harston, becoming Garrick & Cowlishaw. In 1883, they took on James Bickerton Fisher as a partner.

Cowlishaw played in one first-class match for Canterbury in 1864/65.

Cowlishaw was the provincial solicitor for the Canterbury Provincial Council in 1864 and 1865. When Charles Bowen resigned from the provincial council's Avon seat, he won the resulting by-election, beating Musgrave Anderson.

== See also ==
- List of Canterbury representative cricketers
