= Rolland O'Regan =

New Zealand surgeon, activist and politician (1904–1992)

Rolland O'Regan FRCS
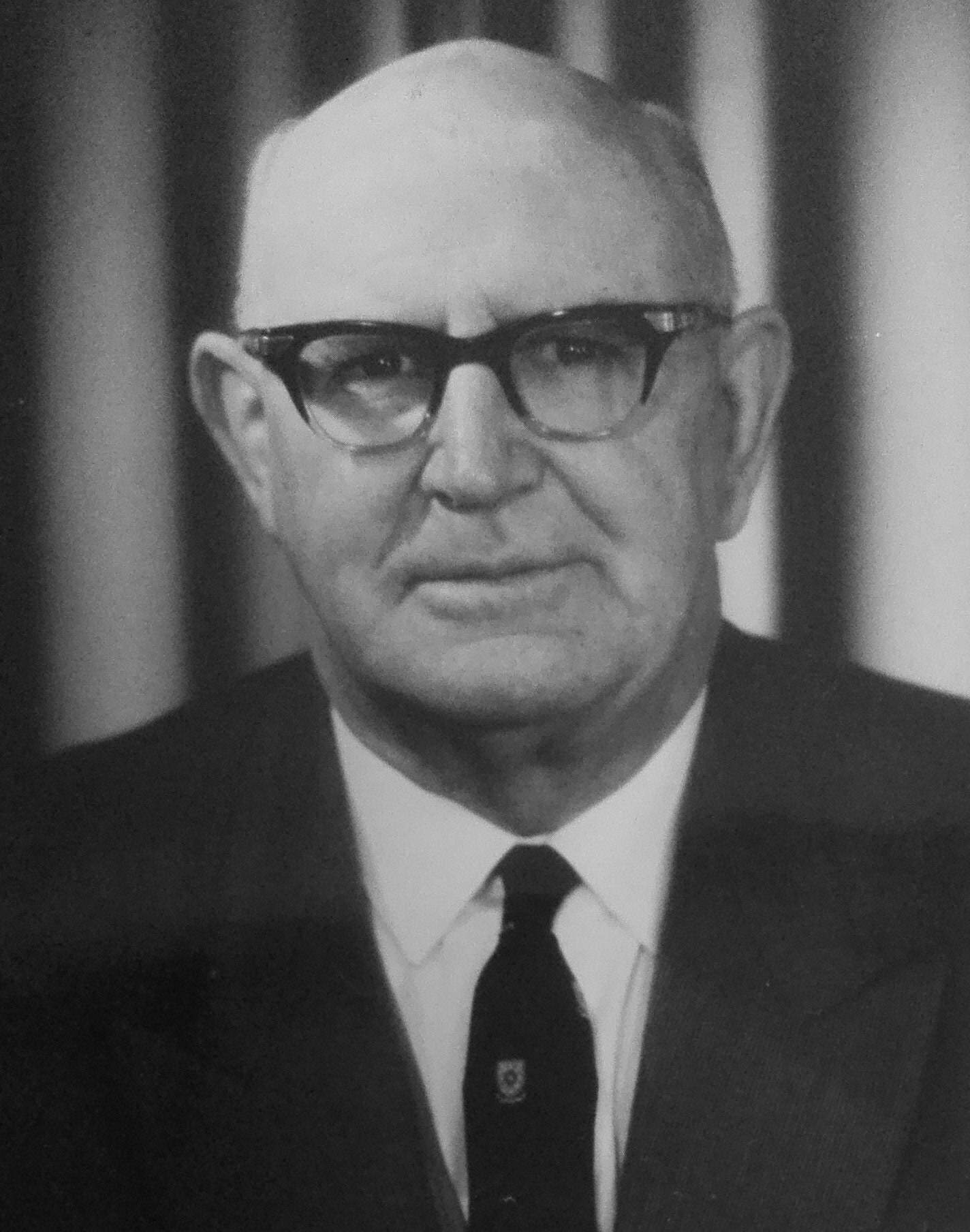

36th Chair of Wellington Harbour Board
- In office 1971–1974
- Preceded by: Eric Malcolm Hodder
- Succeeded by: Henry Alan James

Member of the Wellington City Council
- In office 9 October 1965 – 12 October 1974
- Constituency: At-large

Personal details
- Born: John Arthur Rolland O'Regan; 1 June 1904
- Died: 20 November 1992 (aged 88) Wellington, New Zealand
- Party: Labour
- Spouse: Rena Ruiha Bradshaw
- Relations: Patrick O'Regan (father); Tipene O'Regan (son); Hana O'Regan (granddaughter)
- Education: University of Otago
- Profession: Surgeon

Rolland O'Regan FRCS (born John Arthur Rolland O'Regan; 1 June 1904 – 20 November 1992) was a New Zealand surgeon, activist and politician. He was the son of judge Patrick O'Regan and the father of Richard Mark O'Regan and businessman and academic Sir Tipene O'Regan.

== Biography ==
=== Early life and career ===
O'Regan was born in 1904 and was educated at St Patrick's College. His father was Patrick O'Regan, then a Member of Parliament and later a prominent Wellington judge of the Arbitration Court.

He married Rena Bradshaw (of Ngāi Tahu descent) in 1932 and would later change his name by deed poll from John Arthur Rolland O'Regan to Rolland O'Regan.

=== Medical career ===
He received his tertiary education at the University of Otago, where he studied medicine, graduating as a doctor in 1928. He became a house surgeon at Wellington Hospital for several years, before moving to Britain to do further postgraduate studies. He returned to New Zealand and set up a medical practice of his own. He supported the First Labour Government in their reform of the healthcare system, one of only a few doctors who did so.

During World War II he served as a surgeon aboard three different hospital ships (the Maunganui, Oranje and Pacific Star) where he was largely responsible for the evacuation of wounded Allied servicemen from Burma.

O'Regan was President of the Cancer Society for two years from 1963 to 1965. In 1973 he was elected to the council of the New Zealand Neurological Foundation.

=== Political career ===
O'Regan got his first taste of political activism when he became the chairman of the Citizens' All Black Tour Association that called for the abandonment of the 1960 All Black tour to South Africa. He unsuccessfully lobbied for the government to intervene and cancel the tour alongside such figures as George Nēpia and Vincent Bevan. He remained the chairman until 1966.

In 1965 O'Regan was elected to the Wellington City Council on a Labour Party ticket. He was a popular councillor, always polling highly, and topped the poll on two consecutive elections. He retired from the council in 1974. He was also a member of the Wellington Harbour Board. He was first elected in 1968 and served three years as chairman (1971–74). In 1974 was elected president of the Harbours Association at its annual conference, succeeding Sir Henry Blyde.

O'Regan stood for election to the New Zealand House of Representatives for the Labour Party for the seat of Wellington Central in 1966 finishing runner-up. Soon afterwards O'Regan was approached to stand for Labour in the 1967 Petone by-election, however he was not selected as a candidate. From 1969 to 1970 he was a member of the Labour Party executive.

=== Later life and death ===
He was famed as a tireless public advocate and was a member of the Victoria University Council, the Wellington Polytechnic Council, the Carter Observatory Board and the Wellington Free Ambulance executive. In 1977 the Wellington City Council opened a block of 32 flats in Newtown, next to Wellington Zoo, that housed 70 pensioners. It was named Rolland O'Regan House in his honour for services to the city.

O'Regan died on 20 November 1992, aged 88, and was buried at Karori Cemetery.

== Notes ==
Political offices
| Preceded by Eric Malcolm Hodder | Chair of Wellington Harbour Board; 1971–1974 | Succeeded by Henry Alan James |
