= John Munro (New Zealand politician born 1839) =

New Zealand politician (1839–1910)

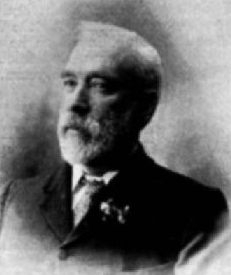
John Munro

John Munro (1839 – 23 November 1910) was a 19th-century Member of Parliament from the West Coast, New Zealand.

== Early life ==
Munro was born in Glasgow, Scotland, in 1839. He came to New Zealand on the Lady Egidia, arriving in Dunedin in 1862. He moved to Invercargill and had an auctioneering business from 1864 to 1867, when he moved to Westport.

== Political career ==
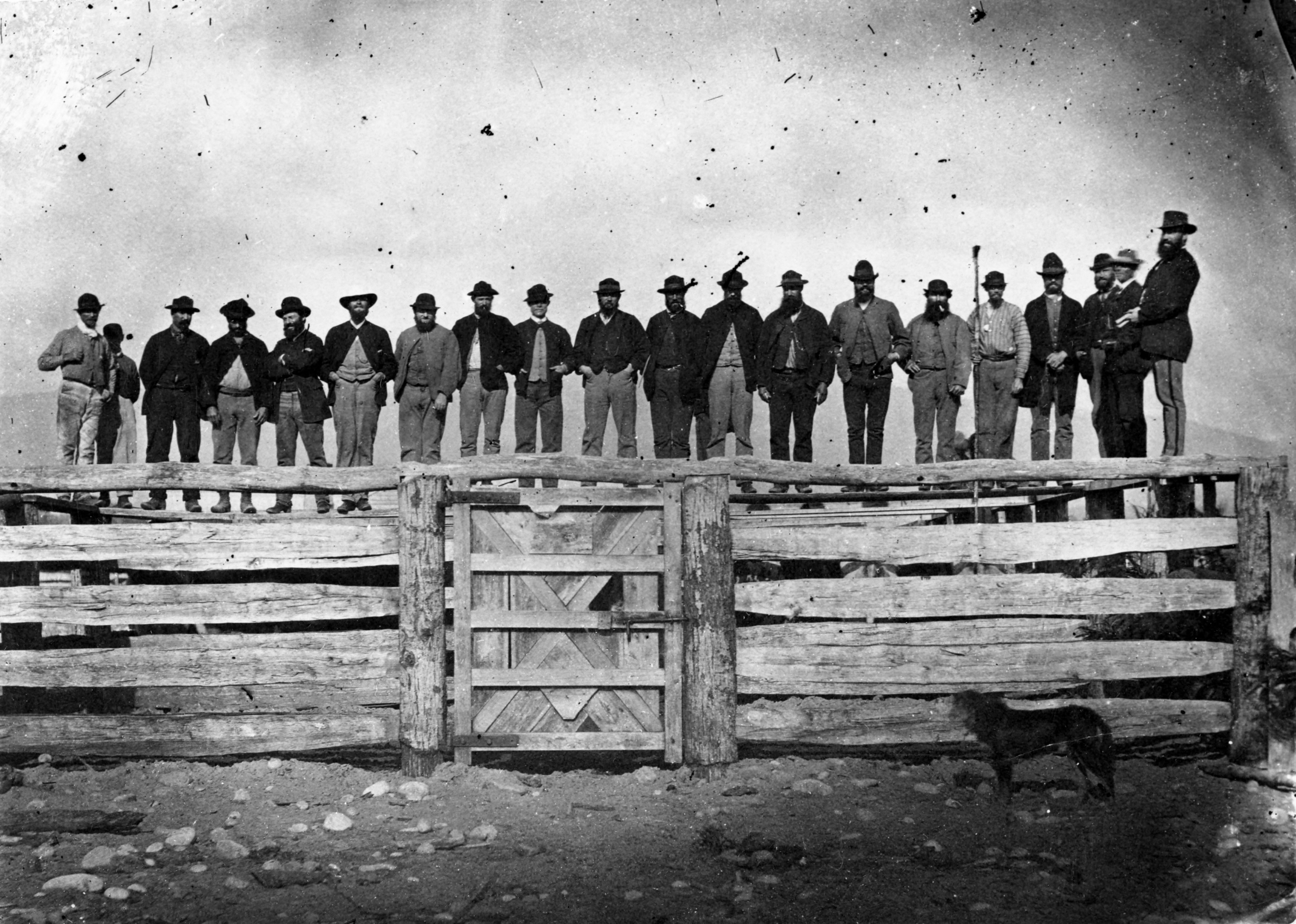
Row of butchers at a stockyard sale at South Spit in Westport, with auctioneer John Munro on the far right

New Zealand Parliament
| Years | Term | Electorate | Party |
|---|---|---|---|
| 1881–1884 | 8th | Buller | Independent |

He was Mayor of Westport for five terms; in 1876–1877 and in 1879–1881. Munro was an independent Liberal (political parties would only form after the 1890 general election). He was considered as one of three possible Liberal candidates for the 1879 general election in the Buller electorate, the others being Eugene O'Conor and James Bickerton Fisher. Fisher was eventually chosen and he beat the incumbent Joseph Henry.

O'Connor and Munro were nominated for the 1881 general election in the Buller electorate. Munro and O'Connor received 423 and 415 votes, respectively; a majority of eight votes for Munro, who was thus declared elected. Munro served until the end of the term in 1884, when he was defeated by Roderick McKenzie.

== Death ==
His wife died on 11 July 1910. He died only a few months later on 23 November 1910, and was survived by four sons and four daughters.

New Zealand Parliament
| Preceded by James Bickerton Fisher | Member of Parliament for Buller; 1881–1884 | Succeeded by Eugene O'Conor |
