= Bill Rowling =

Prime Minister of New Zealand from 1974 to 1975

The Right Honourable Sir Bill Rowling KCMG PC
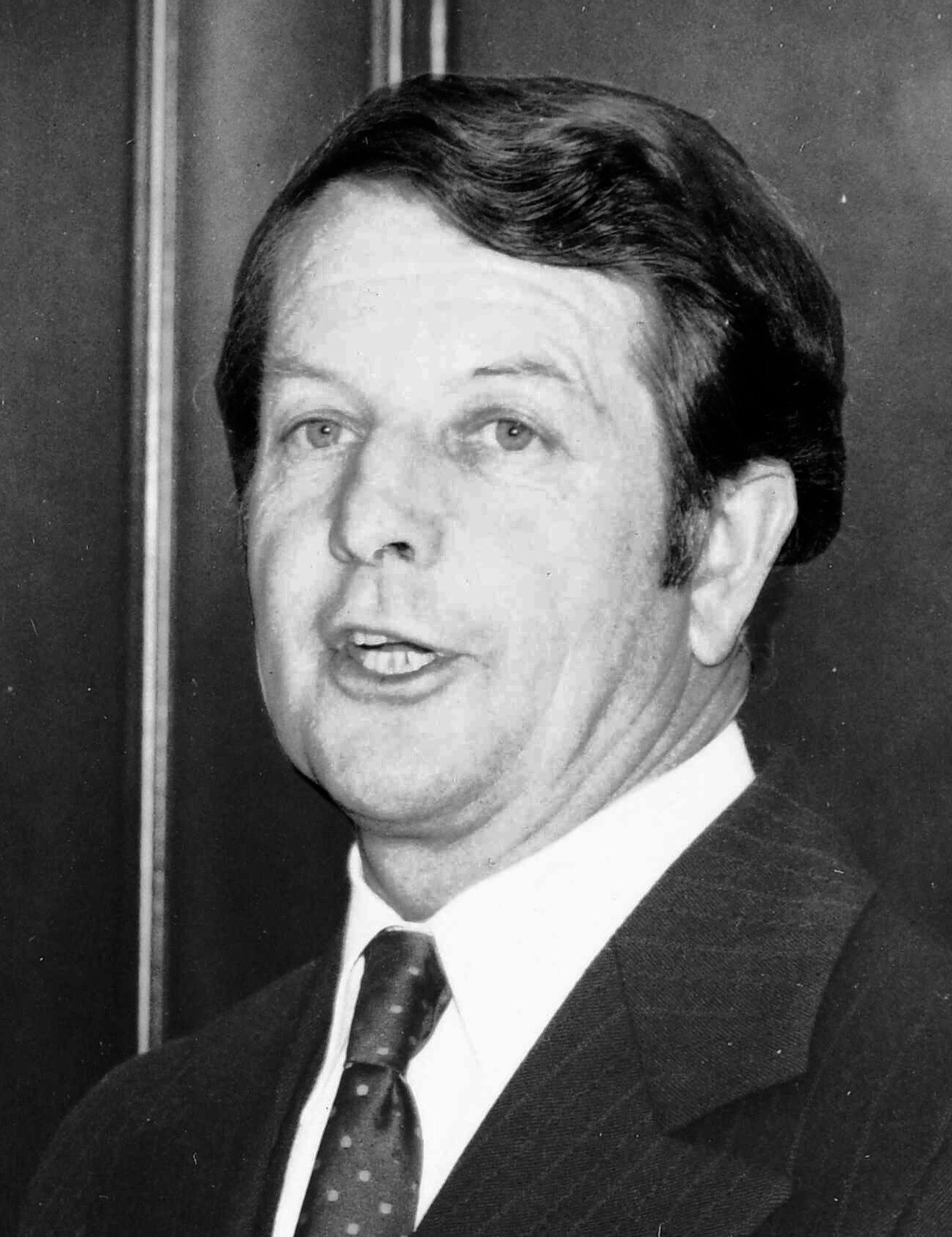
- Rowling in 1974

30th Prime Minister of New Zealand
- In office 6 September 1974 – 12 December 1975
- Monarch: Elizabeth II
- Governor-General: Denis Blundell
- Deputy: Bob Tizard
- Preceded by: Norman Kirk (Note: Hugh Watt served as acting prime minister from 31 August to 6 September 1974.)
- Succeeded by: Robert Muldoon

10th New Zealand Ambassador to the United States
- In office 5 March 1985 – 20 February 1988
- Prime Minister: David Lange
- Preceded by: Lance Adams-Schneider
- Succeeded by: Tim Francis
Senior political offices and ministerial positions held
22nd Leader of the Opposition
In office 12 December 1975 – 3 February 1983
Monarch	Elizabeth II
Prime Minister	Robert Muldoon
Deputy	Bob Tizard; David Lange
Preceded by	Robert Muldoon
Succeeded by	David Lange
7th Leader of the Labour Party
In office 6 September 1974 – 3 February 1983
Deputy	Bob Tizard; David Lange
Preceded by	Norman Kirk (Note: Hugh Watt acted from 31 August to 6 September 1974.)
Succeeded by	David Lange
17th Minister of Foreign Affairs
In office 6 September 1974 – 12 December 1975
Prime Minister	Himself
Preceded by	Norman Kirk
Succeeded by	Brian Talboys
33rd Minister of Finance
In office 8 December 1972 – 6 September 1974
Prime Minister	Norman Kirk
Preceded by	Robert Muldoon
Succeeded by	Bob Tizard
11th Minister of Statistics
In office 8 December 1972 – 6 September 1974
Prime Minister	Norman Kirk
Preceded by	Robert Muldoon
Succeeded by	Mick Connelly
22nd President of the Labour Party
In office 5 May 1970 – 8 May 1973
Leader	Norman Kirk
Preceded by	Norman Douglas
Succeeded by	Charles Bennett
Member of the New Zealand Parliament for Tasman Buller (1962–1972)
In office 7 July 1962 – 14 July 1984
Preceded by	Jerry Skinner
Succeeded by	Ken Shirley

Personal details
- Born: Wallace Edward Rowling; 15 November 1927 Motueka, New Zealand
- Died: 31 October 1995 (aged 67) Nelson, New Zealand
- Party: Labour
- Spouse: Glen Elna Reeves (m. 1951)
- Children: 5
- Education: University of Canterbury
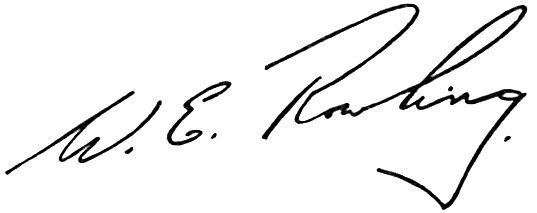
- Signature

Military service
- Branch/service: New Zealand Army
- Years of service: 1956–1961
- Rank: Captain
- Battles/wars: Malayan Emergency

Sir Wallace Edward "Bill" Rowling KCMG PC (/ˈroʊlɪŋ/; 15 November 1927 – 31 October 1995) was a New Zealand politician and diplomat who served as the 30th prime minister of New Zealand and the seventh leader of the Labour Party from 1974 to 1975. He later served as the 10th New Zealand ambassador to the United States from 1985 to 1988.

Before entering politics, Rowling worked as a teacher and briefly served in the army; he became a member of Parliament (MP) in the 1962 Buller by-election. Not long after entering parliament Rowling began to rise through Labour's internal hierarchy, and he was Party President from 1970 to 1973. He was serving as Minister of Finance (1972–1974) when he was appointed prime minister following the death of the highly popular Norman Kirk.

Rowling's Labour Government's effort to retrieve the economy ended with an upset victory by the National Party in November 1975. Rowling continued to lead the Labour Party, winning the popular vote in two consecutive elections in which National won the most seats. Upon retiring from the party's leadership in 1983, he was knighted. He served as Ambassador to the United States from 1985 to 1988.

== Early life ==
Rowling was born in a country suburb of Māriri neighbouring the town of Motueka, near Nelson. He was a member of a long-established farming family. His father, Arthur Rowling, started his own orchard and was the chairman of the Motueka Labour Representation Committee. Rowling's father was friends with many prominent Labour Party politicians including Michael Joseph Savage, Peter Fraser, Paddy Webb and Bob Semple. They were regular visitors to the family home and made an impression on Rowling during his youth. He was educated at the local primary school and later Nelson College. He left aged 17 and attempted to enlist in the New Zealand Army to serve in J Force during the occupation of Japan. However authorities discovered he was under 18 preventing him from going.

He attended the University of Canterbury, gaining a master's degree in economics. He also attended the Christchurch College of Education (currently, University of Canterbury), qualifying as a teacher. After completing his education, Rowling taught at several schools around the country, including at Motueka, Christchurch, Waverley and in Northland. In 1953 he joined the Maori Education Service, teaching at a school in Whangape. He became involved in local political organising and formed a new branch of the Labour Party in the area. In 1955–56 he was awarded a Fulbright fellowship to the United States and taught at a junior high school in Seattle. He returned to New Zealand and taught at Hūkerenui. He resumed his role as a political organiser and was elected chairman of the Hobson Labour Representation Committee.

In 1958, Rowling left teaching and joined the New Zealand Army for four years eventually gaining the rank of captain. He became assistant director of Army Education. He spent a short time serving abroad in Malaysia and Singapore, a deployment connected with the Malayan Emergency. While assistant director he also lectured economics part-time at Canterbury University as well as studying accountancy.

== Member of Parliament ==
New Zealand Parliament
Years	Term	Electorate	Party
1962–1963	33rd	Buller	Labour
1963–1966	34th	Buller	Labour
1966–1969	35th	Buller	Labour
1969–1972	36th	Buller	Labour
1972–1975	37th	Tasman	Labour
1975–1978	38th	Tasman	Labour
1978–1981	39th	Tasman	Labour
1981–1984	40th	Tasman	Labour

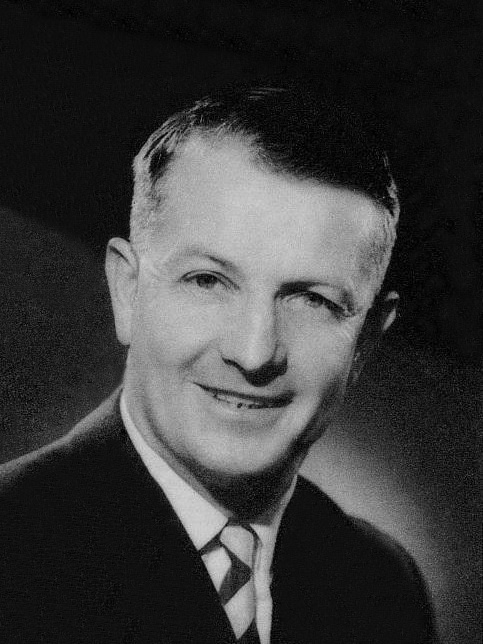
Campaign photo during the Buller by-election, 1962

In the 1960 election, Rowling was selected as the Labour Party's candidate for the Fendalton electorate in Christchurch. Fendalton was regarded as a safe National seat, and Rowling was defeated by the National Party's Harry Lake (who was appointed Minister of Finance in the new National government). Two years later, however, Rowling successfully contested the by-election for Buller, which had been caused by the death of prominent Labour MP Jerry Skinner. Rowling, with a farming background, became Labour's spokesperson on Agriculture and Lands, portfolios previously held by Skinner. Rowling was to hold the Buller seat until the election of 1972, when the seat was dissolved – Rowling then contested successfully the new seat of Tasman, which he did travelling up and down the electorate by Commer campervan, which he lived in for the time.

Not long after entering parliament Rowling began to rise through Labour's internal hierarchy. At the 1966, 1967 and 1968 party conferences Rowling stood for the vice-presidency of the Labour Party, but was narrowly defeated by Henry May on each occasion, however he managed to defeat May in 1969. The following year he was elevated to party presidency. He was the first person to be elected to their first term as president unopposed in Labour history. While Labour was in opposition under Labour leader Norman Kirk Rowling was spokesperson for several portfolios including Overseas Trade, Marketing, Broadcasting, Mines, Planning Development and natural resources.

In the lead up to the 1972 election Kirk tried to persuade Rowling to transfer from the more marginal Tasman seat to the safe Christchurch seat of Avon. Kirk feared Rowling (by then party president) might lose his seat and did not want to lose his economics expertise. Rowling refused on the grounds that such a self interested move would not be befitting of a party president.

=== Minister of Finance ===
When the Labour Party won power under Norman Kirk in the 1972 election, Rowling was appointed Minister of Finance. This could be seen as a considerable promotion for someone without prior ministerial experience, though the government was inexperienced as a whole with Labour's deputy leader Hugh Watt the only minister with prior cabinet experience. His allocation of the finance portfolio was contrary to expectation, given Bob Tizard had been the finance spokesperson when in opposition. Both Warren Freer and Watt had favoured Tizard for the finance portfolio, but Kirk thought he was not steady enough for the role and was suspicious of him as an "intellectual". Rowling was New Zealand's first finance minister who was also a qualified economist.

As finance minister, Rowling imbued nationalistic sentiments, declaring his goal to make sure the country was developed "by New Zealanders for New Zealanders" and warned that New Zealanders were in danger of losing control of their own country and its industries. The Labour government enjoyed a record budget surplus in its first year and revalued the currency accordingly. However, the slowing global economy, an unprecedented rise in oil prices and a rapid rise in government expenditure led to soaring inflation by 1974.

The remainder of Rowling's term as Minister of Finance was somewhat turbulent; from late in 1973, a series of externally generated crises, of which the 'oil shocks' were the most serious, destabilised the New Zealand economy. These added to other problems, such as growing overseas debt and falling export prices. The government had spent large fulfilling its election promises and Kirk was loath to reduce spending despite the economic conditions worsening. Rowling's instinct was to reduce government expenditure to which Kirk would accuse him of being a tightwad.

=== Prime Minister (1974–1975) ===
- Premiership of Bill Rowling; 6 September 1974 – 12 December 1975
- Monarch: Elizabeth II
- Cabinet: Third Labour Government of New Zealand
- Party: New Zealand Labour Party
- Appointed by: Denis Blundell

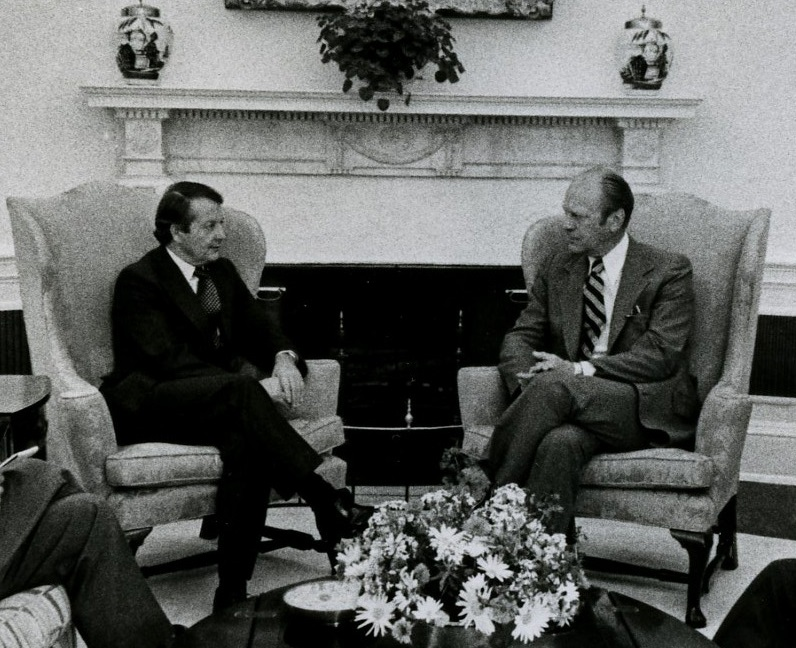
Rowling (left) with US President Gerald Ford in 1975

In August 1974 Norman Kirk died unexpectedly. His deputy, Hugh Watt, took on the role of acting prime minister for several days while the Labour Party caucus chose a new leader. Rowling was one of several ministers speculated as potentially succeeding Kirk, though Watt was initially seen as the frontrunner. After several other possible candidates ruled themselves out, the field was narrowed to a two-way race between Rowling and Watt, with Rowling now being seen as the front-runner to win. However, the party's National Executive and the Federation of Labour still preferred Watt.

A caucus vote was held on 6 September 1974 where Rowling received a surprisingly large majority, beating Watt 44 votes to 9. At age 46, he became the youngest New Zealand Prime Minister since 1887. Rowling was officially confirmed as party leader and 30th Prime Minister on 6 September 1974. In the cabinet reshuffle following Kirk's death, Rowling took the foreign affairs portfolio. He was appointed to the Privy Council. Rowling had the option of replacing Kirk in the safe Labour seat of Sydenham but chose to remain in his (more marginal) home electorate of Tasman. Rowling considered the idea of holding a snap election under the guise of seeking a personal mandate for himself as prime minister. He was dissuaded from doing so to avoid looking opportunistic and due to Labour having trouble fundraising. Close colleagues in the cabinet were more keen on the idea, but the wider caucus (many of whom held marginal seats) were more reluctant. Agriculture minister Colin Moyle attempted, but failed, to convince Rowling to hold a snap election in October 1974 which he was convinced Labour would have won with the loss of only one or two seats.

Unlike the pro-life Kirk, Rowling was pro-choice. In June 1975, he set up the Royal Commission on Contraception, Sterilisation and Abortion; it issued a report in 1977, with recommendations that were incorporated into the Contraception, Sterilisation, and Abortion Act 1977.

Although Rowling also served as Minister of Foreign Affairs, his government concentrated primarily on domestic affairs. While Rowling's deputy Bob Tizard had replaced him as Minister of Finance, the seriousness of the economic downturn required the Prime Minister's attention. The Government defended heavy overseas borrowing as necessary to protect jobs. In August 1975, the New Zealand dollar was devalued by 15% to assist local manufacturers and exporters. The recession was the worst in 40 years and Rowling focused on ensuring mass unemployment did not ensue. His main policy approaches to do this were stimulatory spending to ensured domestic demand did not drop further and to persuade trade unions to agree to wage moderation. Overall the fiscal outlook during his premiership was overshadowed by the ongoing impacts of the 1973 oil crisis which constrained what could be done. Nevertheless, his government introduced a number of progressive measures, such as an expansion of spending on education by providing a standard bursary for all students in tertiary studies from 1975. Another major financial policy during Rowling's premiership was a comprehensive superannuation scheme in which employees and employers each contributed a minimum of 4% of gross earnings.

==== 1975 general election ====
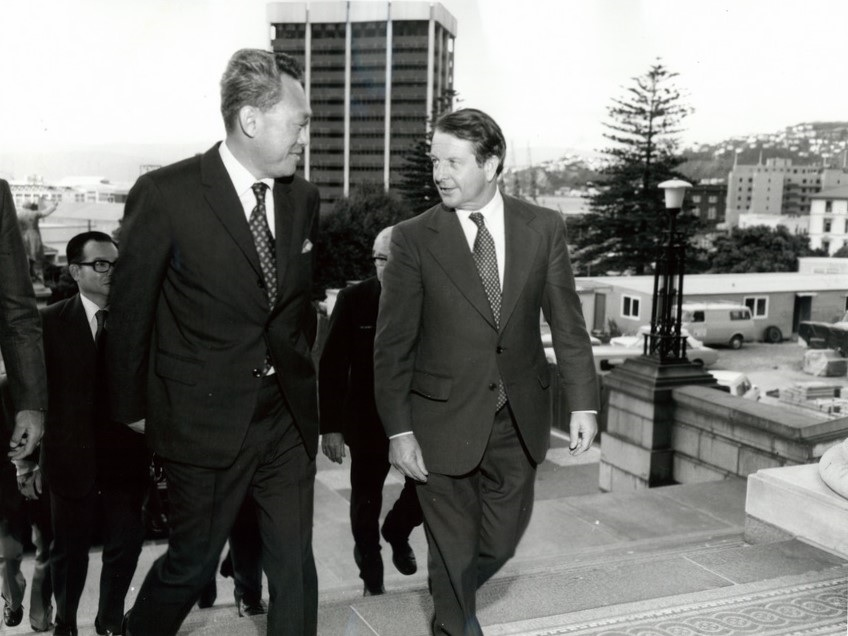
Rowling (right) with Singaporean Prime Minister Lee Kuan Yew in April 1975

During the 1975 election campaign, Rowling was attacked by the Opposition led by Robert Muldoon, and was generally characterised as being weak and ineffective. Rowling supporters responded with a "Citizens for Rowling" campaign which enlisted high-profile New Zealanders such as Sir Edmund Hillary to praise Rowling's low-key consultative approach. The campaign was labelled as being elitist, and was generally regarded as having backfired on Rowling. While highlighting his strengths, the campaign did not play to them. According to biographer John Henderson, Rowling "...was averse to the public image grooming process − the play-acting side of politics repelled him."

The November election resulted in a surprise defeat for the Labour Party, and Rowling was unable to retain the premiership.

Rowling himself felt that he never had the opportunity to show his leadership capabilities while prime minister. Henderson stated that had Rowling been re-elected he had every intention of initiating the economic reform that was delayed by Muldoon and eventually became Rogernomics, albeit in a more planned manner and slower pace.

=== Leader of the Opposition ===
After resigning as prime minister, Rowling managed to retain the party leadership, though murmurs about the effectiveness of his leadership abounded. His first test as leader of the Opposition came soon when Labour had to defend one of its seats in early 1976 at a by-election in Nelson. The by-election was seen as crucial to Rowling's future as commentators were suggesting he could not withstand two losses in a row. Labour fought a strong campaign and not only retained the seat but increased their majority as well. The success in Nelson periodically quietened the speculation about Rowling's leadership.

Rowling then had to deal with two scandals involving two of his MPs, his approach to which, were regarded as heavy-handed and unnecessary in many circles. In 1976 Island Bay MP and party vice-president Gerald O'Brien was charged by police for allegedly indecently inviting two boys back to his motel room for a drink. Despite the charges being thrown out, O'Brien was subsequently deselected by Labour as its Island Bay candidate. O'Brien maintained that it was nothing but an attempt by political enemies to "get rid of me". He also stated that he got more sympathy from members of the National Party than from his own party.

This was followed by the 'Moyle Affair', in which Labour MP Colin Moyle was accused by Muldoon of having been 'picked up' by the police the previous year on suspicion of homosexual activities. A Commission of Inquiry ensued and Moyle eventually resigned from Parliament intending to vindicate himself by winning a by-election for his seat of Mangere. Rowling met with him and persuaded his close friend Moyle not to seek the nomination for the 1977 by-election. Large numbers protested at the 1977 Labour Party Conference; many in the LGBT community never forgave him.

Rowling gradually managed to improve public perceptions of him which were ironically assisted by the Moyle and O'Brien 'affairs' where his public reputation for timidity turned around. The Evening Post reporter Mike Nicolaidi stated "He [Rowling] is considered by some to be 'a mouse' in public, but his roar is being increasingly heard within the party machine." At the 1978 election Rowling led a strong campaign which saw a huge turnaround in Labour's fortunes, actually winning more votes than National. The election night result had National with more seats, but many seats had small majorities and it was conceivable that if special votes overturned enough electorates Labour could form a government. Ultimately this did not eventuate and Labour remained in opposition. Rowling's leadership was credited with the turnaround in public opinion.

Following the 1978 election Rowling alienated some Māori after removing Matiu Rata, the party's experienced and well-regarded Māori Affairs spokesman, from the Opposition front bench. Earlier, Rowling had replaced Rata with himself as convenor of Labour's Māori Affairs Committee. Rata complained about the insensitivity of Labour's Māori policy and went on to form his own Māori rights party, Mana Motuhake. Rata resigned his seat in fought a by-election for his constituency but Labour's candidate Bruce Gregory retained the electorate for Labour.

Labour suffered ructions after Shadow Minister of Transport and Communications Roger Douglas released an "Alternative Budget" against Rowling's wishes. The proposals were not official Labour policy and their publication was seen by Rowling as a challenge to his authority and Douglas was sacked from the shadow cabinet on 30 June 1980. Douglas then became an agitator against Rowling. Throughout 1980, Labour's poll rating steadily declined eventually reaching the point where they were barely ahead of the Social Credit Party (a minor party). In response to this he was subjected to a leadership challenge at the end of the year. Rowling narrowly survived by one vote (his own). He was visibly angered by the challenge, calling his challengers (dubbed the Fish and Chip Brigade) "nakedly ambitious rats" to the press, a comment that he refused to retract.

At the 1981 election Labour once again secured more votes than the National Party but still failed to gain a majority of seats. Rowling (as in 1978) claimed a moral victory.

Following the election loss there were serious discussions regarding the future of affiliated trade unions in the Labour Party. Labour was frequently attacked for being the 'party of unions' despite only 15% of unions being affiliated and providing just 8% of the annual party funds. In February 1982 Rowling gave a speech at a Labour regional conference in Timaru where he suggested Labour should sever formal links with trade unions, citing the party's public perception being too closely associated with unions and that there had been a large demographic shift in members from the working class to middle-class liberals. Rowling was supported by his Shadow Minister for Labour, Fred Gerbic, and several leading union figures such as national secretary of the New Zealand Electrical and Related Trades Union Tony Neary and secretary of the Wellington Clothing Workers Union Frank Thorn who stated their belief that their affiliation fees were too high and offered little benefit in return. Others such as Jim Knox, the secretary of the New Zealand Federation of Labour and Jim Anderton, the president of the Labour Party, were opposed and argued for a continuing union presence in the party. By March the debate heated up with Rowling and Gerbic publicly expressing another concern that some affiliated unions had members of other parties, in particular the Socialist Unity Party (SUP). Anderton publicly disagreed with Rowling stating that the SUP had no influence in the Labour Party and that "The entire membership of the SUP could be written on the back of a postage stamp." At Labour's annual conference in May 1982 the conference delegates rejected Rowling's proposal and union affiliation remained. As a result of this failure Douglas publicly questioned Rowling's leadership qualities and lack of direction. Rowling did not respond though Anderton staunchly defended Rowling from Douglas' comments.

While Rowling had largely managed to undo his negative image, many people in the Labour Party nevertheless believed that it was time for a change and he announced his retirement from the leadership to the Labour caucus in late 1982. In February 1983 Rowling was succeeded as leader by the charismatic David Lange, who went on to defeat Muldoon in the 1984 election. After relinquishing the leadership he remained on the front bench as Shadow Minister of Foreign Affairs. Rowling retired from parliament at the 1984 election.

== Later life and death ==
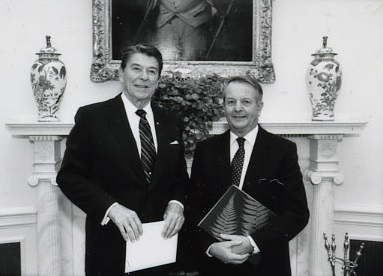
Rowling (right) with US President Ronald Reagan in 1985

After leaving politics, Rowling was appointed by Lange as Ambassador to the United States, serving from 1985 to 1988. He held that position when the issue of nuclear weapons and ANZUS flared up between the United States and New Zealand, and he travelled extensively across the country explaining the policy. He later became president of the New Zealand Institute of International Affairs.

Exasperated at Labour's free-market Rogernomics economic platform initiated by his successor, Rowling eventually let his party membership lapse, expressing dismay at policies undertaken by both the Fourth Labour and Fourth National governments. He was disappointed that the Labour government had disintegrated and led to Lange's resignation as prime minister. He felt the caucus made a significant error in re-electing Douglas (who had been a thorn in Rowling's side years earlier) to cabinet which caused Lange to quit. Rowling stated that the vote indicated caucus was "bent on its own political destruction." He was supportive of Helen Clark replacing Mike Moore for the leadership of the Labour Party in 1993. He stated he felt Clark's style of leadership would be better suited to working with other parties such as the Alliance.

Rowling later became highly involved in a number of community organisations, charities and trusts. He was chairman of the 1992 commemorations of Abel Tasman's mapping of New Zealand. He also played a prominent role at the Museum of New Zealand, and is considered to have been the "driving force" behind the eventual establishment of Te Papa despite drastic public spending cutbacks. In 1988 the government had appointed him as chairman of the Museum Project Development Board. In 1992 he was appointed to the Museum of New Zealand board and he became chairman of the board in 1994. Rowling resigned from the board on 9 October 1995 citing ill-health. His family did not disclose the nature of the illness to media, only stating it was "serious."

Later in that same month, Rowling died of cancer in Nelson on 31 October 1995.

== Personal life ==
While teaching near Lake Rotoiti he met Glen Reeves. They married in 1951 at Waverley Anglican Church. They had five children. The couple's second child died when she was five months old in 1957; another daughter, Kim, committed suicide at the age of 18. Rowling was a practising Anglican. In retirement he took up jogging and participated in several marathons.

== Honours and awards ==
In the 1983 Queen's Birthday Honours, Rowling was appointed a Knight Commander of the Order of St Michael and St George. He was conferred an honorary law doctorate by the University of Canterbury in 1987, and he was honoured by the Netherlands as a Commander in the Orde van Oranje-Nassau.

In the 1988 Queen's Birthday Honours, Glen, Lady Rowling, was appointed a Companion of the Queen's Service Order for community service.

== See also ==
- Electoral history of Bill Rowling

== Notes ==
New Zealand Parliament
Preceded by Jerry Skinner	Member of Parliament for Buller; 1962–1972	Constituency abolished
New constituency	Member of Parliament for Tasman; 1972–1984	Succeeded by Ken Shirley
Political offices
Preceded by Norman Kirk	Prime Minister of New Zealand; 1974–1975	Succeeded by Robert Muldoon
Preceded by Norman Kirk	Minister of Foreign Affairs; 1974–1975	Succeeded by Brian Talboys
Preceded by Robert Muldoon	Minister of Finance; 1972–1974	Succeeded by Bob Tizard
Preceded by Robert Muldoon	Minister of Statistics; 1972–1974	Succeeded by Mick Connelly
Preceded by Robert Muldoon	Leader of the Opposition; 1975–1982	Succeeded by David Lange
Party political offices
Preceded by Norman Douglas	President of the Labour Party; 1970–1973	Succeeded by Charles Bennett
Preceded by Norman Kirk	Leader of the Labour Party; 1974–1983	Succeeded by David Lange
Diplomatic posts
Preceded by Lance Adams-Schneider	Ambassador to the United States; 1985–1988	Succeeded by Tim Francis
