= James Bickerton Fisher =

New Zealand politician (1843–1910)

Member of the New Zealand Parliament for Buller
- In office 9 September 1879 – 8 November 1881

Personal details
- Born: 2 November 1843 Diss, Norfolk, England
- Died: 23 January 1910 (aged 66) Christchurch, New Zealand
- Resting place: Linwood Cemetery
- Party: Independent

James Bickerton Fisher (2 November 1843 – 23 January 1910) was a 19th-century Member of Parliament from the West Coast, New Zealand.

== Family genealogy ==
Old notes from the Rev Thomas Richard Fisher, James Bickerton Fisher's father, had his family originating in Packington, England, and being related to the Fishers of Packington manor, but they actually lived nearby in Eastcote and Barston and were just cousins to the Fishers of Packington.

James Bickerton Fisher's line descended from Thomas Fisher born 1460, the eldest son and heir to Clement Fisher of Eastcote who died circa 1505. Thus Thomas Fisher was elder brother to John Fisher of Packington. Although Thomas Fisher also worked for the king, his descendants focused on farming rather than politics or the military and where not quite as famous or wealthy as their Packington cousins, however they are recorded in historical records as a being a very influential family in both Eastcote and Barston for some 250 years.

Most history or genealogical books have John Fisher of Packington descending from Osbernus Piscator. Osbernus is recorded in the Doomsday Survey of 1085/86 (the first recorded census of England) as a land owner in Carlton, and Sharnbrook in Bedfordshire. His family came from Normandy, France, in about 990 AD and are recorded as living in England during the reign of Edward the Confessor (1042–1066). Osbernus Piscator's son Alanus Piscator died circa 1100 and from his descendants came Nicholas Piscator alias Fisher who died circa 1280. Some books claim the Packington Fishers descended from Nicholas, but this is recognised as a generalisation. Nicholas's line mostly descended to Sir Thomas Fisher of London and Middlesex and to Robert Fisher of Chetwynd. Another line from Osbernus led to Saint John Fisher, Bishop of Rochester, beheaded by Henry VIII in 1535.

== Early life and family ==
Fisher was born on 2 November 1843 at Diss in Norfolk, England. He arrived in Wellington on the Myrtle in 1857 and finished his education at Christ's College in Christchurch.

Fisher married in Australia on 23 October 1880 Helen Margaret Nicol born in Warrnambool, Australia, in 1856, the daughter of Gilbert Nicol of Rosehill, Warrnambool whose family had settled that town. She died on 13 June 1882 aged 26, nine days after giving birth to their daughter Nellie.

From this marriage he had one child Nellie Minnie Fisher born on 4 June 1882 and who died in 1941 aged 59. She married on 18 August 1914 at Wellington, Francis Reginald Aveling who was born in London in 1884 and whom she had met on the steamer Mooltan whilst travelling to London with her family. They lived in Thorndon and Hataitai in Wellington. They had one son, Captain Bruce Hamilton Aveling MBE born in Wellington on 4 July 1914. He married Grace Annie Swhan Georgetti in 1947 and they had two sons, Michael Hamilton and Peter Hamilton.

James Bickerton Fisher married secondly on 28 December 1886 in Oamaru Rose Louisson born in 1862 and who died in 1915 aged 53. Rose was the daughter of Cecil Louisson an hotelier and brewer of England then Australia and later Christchurch and Palmerston North.

From this marriage there were two children:

1. George Bickerton Fisher born on 26 May 1888 and who died in 1974 aged 86
2. Dorothy Bickerton Fisher born on 29 November 1889 and who died in 1974 aged 85

== Life in New Zealand ==
Fisher in his later years

New Zealand Parliament
Years	Term	Electorate	Party
1879–1881	7th	Buller	Independent

After school, Fisher trained as a solicitor with Francis James Garrick and received his call to the bar in 1868. From 1870, Fisher practised in Westport where he became Crown Prosecutor.

Fisher represented the Westport electorate in the Nelson Provincial Council from 24 November 1873 until 6 June 1874. He represented the Buller electorate in the House of Representatives from 1879 to 1881, when he retired. He returned to Christchurch in 1882 and after practising by himself for some time, he became a partner in Garrick, Cowlishaw and Fisher, solicitors of Gloucester Street. Fisher was the solicitor for Christchurch City Council. He retired on 1 January 1910 aged 67 and died later that month, on 23 January, after a short illness at his home "Upton" in 97 Blighs Road, Papanui. He was interred at Linwood Cemetery. After his death his estate was valued at 24,266 pounds.

New Zealand Parliament
Preceded by Joseph Henry	Member of Parliament for Buller; 1879–1881	Succeeded by John Munro
