= Diane Charlie-Puna =

Cook Islands public servant

Diane Charlie-Puna is Cook Islands public servant. She was named secretary of the Ministry of Infrastructure in 2018. She previously served as the ministry's director of corporate services.

Prior to this, Charlie-Puna spent 15 years working in public sector management and leadership. Charlie-Puna has of a Masters of Philosophy degree with First Class Honours, under the supervision of Tania Ka'ai and Rachael Ka'ai-Mahuta. She received her MBA in 2011. She also serves on the board of the Pacific Water and Wastewater Association.
