= Inangahua (electorate) =

Inangahua is a former parliamentary electorate in the Buller District, which is part of the West Coast region of New Zealand, from 1881 to 1896. The town of Inangahua Junction, which gave the electorate its name, was located in the adjacent Buller electorate until 1887.

== Population centres ==
The previous electoral redistribution was undertaken in 1875 for the 1875–1876 election. In the six years since, New Zealand's European population had increased by 65%. In the 1881 electoral redistribution, the House of Representatives increased the number of European representatives to 91 (up from 84 since the 1875–76 election). The number of Māori electorates was held at four. The House further decided that electorates should not have more than one representative, which led to 35 new electorates being formed, including Inangahua, and two electorates that had previously been abolished to be recreated. This necessitated a major disruption to existing boundaries.

The original electorate was landlocked. Springs Junction and Reefton were located in the Inangahua electorate, but the township of Inangahua itself was located in the adjacent Buller electorate. In the 1887 electoral redistribution, the electorate expanded to the north and the west, gained access to the coast, and gained the townships of Inangahua, Owen River (a settlement during the gold rush), and Murchison.

== History ==
Inangahua was represented by six Members of Parliament: Thomas S. Weston from 1881 to 1883 (resigned), Edward Shaw from 1883 to 1884 (retired), Stuart Menteath from 1884 to 1887 (elected for Te Aro electorate). Richard Reeves represented the electorate from 1887 to 1893, when he was adjudged bankrupt. He was challenged in the 1890 election by John Drake, a representative of Labour Unionists. The incumbent won the election by a one-vote margin (1003 votes to 1002).

Robert Stout was briefly a member in 1893 (from 8 June to 8 November) after Reeves (a fellow Liberal Party member) resigned when he became bankrupt. Stout successfully stood in the City of Wellington electorate in the 1893 election. The last representative for Inangahua was Patrick O'Regan from 1893 to 1896. When Inangahua was abolished in 1896, O'Regan was elected for Buller.

=== Members of Parliament ===
Key

Independent Liberal

Election	Winner
1881 election	Thomas S. Weston
1883 by-election	Edward Shaw
1884 election	Stuart Menteath
1887 election	Richard Reeves
1890 election	Richard Reeves
1893 by-election	Robert Stout
1893 election	Patrick O'Regan
(Electorate abolished in 1896; see Buller)

== Election results ==
=== 1893 election ===
1893 general election: Inangahua
Party	Candidate	Votes	%	±%
Liberal	Patrick O'Regan	1,121	38.91	+9.58
Independent	William Goodwin Collings	917	31.83	
Liberal	Richard Reeves	843	29.26	
Majority		204	7.08	−34.28
Turnout		2,881	82.74	
Registered electors		3,482		

=== 1893 by-election ===
1893 Inangahua by-election
Party	Candidate	Votes	%	±%
Liberal	Robert Stout	1,899	70.67	
Liberal	Patrick O'Regan	788	29.33	
Majority		611	41.36	
Turnout		2,687		

=== 1890 election ===
1890 general election: Inangahua
Party	Candidate	Votes	%	±%
Liberal	Richard Reeves	1,103	50.03	
Conservative	John Drake	1,102	49.97	
Majority		1	0.04	
Turnout		2,205	64.09	
Registered electors		3,440		

=== 1881 election ===
General election, 1881: Inangahua
Party	Candidate	Votes	%	±%
Independent	Thomas S. Weston	739	57.11	
Independent	Richard Reeves	516	39.88	
Independent	William McLean	39	3.01	
Majority		223	17.23	
Turnout		1,294	65.89	
Registered electors		1,964		
