= Eugene O'Conor =

New Zealand politician

Eugene Joseph O'Conor (23 February 1835 – 5 July 1912) was a New Zealand Member of Parliament for the Buller electorate, in the South Island.

== Private life ==
Born in Ireland in 1835, O'Conor went to Victoria, Australia in 1854, and came to New Zealand in the early 1860s. He was a cattle dealer and storekeeper. O'Conor had 'several useful inventions patented' and lectured on his opinion that Francis Bacon (Baconian theory) was the author of Shakespeare's plays. He was a significant land owner on the West Coast.

== Member of Parliament ==
New Zealand Parliament
Years	Term	Electorate	Party
1871–1875	5th	Buller	Independent
1884–1887	9th	Buller	Independent
1887–1890	10th	Buller	Independent
1890–1893	11th	Buller	Independent

O'Conor was a member of the Nelson Provincial Council. From November 1869 to October 1873, he represented the Buller electorate. From May 1874 until the abolition of the Nelson Province in October 1876, he represented the Westport electorate. From June 1874, he was on the Nelson Executive Council for a time (the source does not record an end date).

Eugene O'Conor represented the Buller electorate in the New Zealand House of Representatives from 1871 to 1875 and again between 1884 and 1893. He was known as the 'Buller Lion' for his strong advocacy of local interests and was opposed to 'party government'. O'Conor had advanced ideas and promoted democratic measures, including removing the property qualification for the franchise and having the Legislative Council directly elected by the people.

== Death ==
O'Conor died on 5 July 1912 in Nelson. His wife had pre-deceased him in 1890. They had no children, and he left the majority of his estate to destitute children and old people in Westport.

== See also ==
The Karamea Special Settlement 1874

== Notes ==
New Zealand Parliament
New constituency	Member of Parliament for Buller; 1871–1875; 1884–1893	Succeeded by Joseph Henry
Preceded by John Munro	Member of Parliament for Buller; 1871–1875; 1884–1893	Succeeded by Roderick McKenzie
