= James Colvin =

New Zealand politician (1844–1919)

The Honourable James Colvin
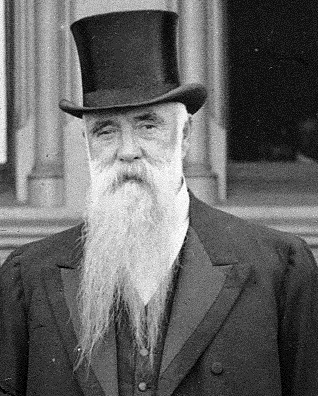

9th Mayor of Westport
- In office 1898–1900
- Preceded by: Hans Larsen
- Succeeded by: James Scanlon

Member of the New Zealand Parliament for Buller
- In office 1899–1919
- Preceded by: Patrick O'Regan
- Succeeded by: Harry Holland

Personal details
- Born: 1844 County Donegal, Ireland
- Died: 29 October 1919 (aged 74–75) Wellington, New Zealand
- Party: Liberal

James Colvin (1844 – 29 October 1919) was a New Zealand Member of Parliament for Buller, in the South Island.

== Early life ==
Colvin was born in 1844 in County Donegal, Ireland, where he received his education. He emigrated to Victoria, Australia in 1861 and went gold mining in Creswick and Daylesford. He came to New Zealand in 1862 and joined the Otago gold rush in Dunstan and Wakatipu, from where he went to the gold fields in the Wakamarina Valley in Marlborough; he set up a store in the latter place. When he was a young man, Colvin was held up by a member of the Burgess-Sullivan gang (also known as the Maungatapu Murderers) near where George Dobson had been murdered a few days previously. Unknown to his interrogator James Colvin was carrying 2,000 pounds worth of gold on his saddle, and managed to pass unmolested.

== Political career ==
New Zealand Parliament
Years	Term	Electorate	Party
1899–1902	14th	Buller	Independent Liberal
1902–1905	15th	Buller	Liberal
1905–1908	16th	Buller	Liberal
1908–1911	17th	Buller	Liberal
1911–1914	18th	Buller	Liberal
1914–1919	19th	Buller	Liberal

He served on numerous boards and committees: the Buller County Council (1885–89), Westport Harbour Board (Chairman 1890), and was mayor of Westport between 1898 and 1900.

Colvin stood in the Buller electorate in the 1896 election but was defeated by Patrick O'Regan. He defeated O'Regan in 1899 as a supporter of Richard Seddon, and represented the Buller electorate in the House of Representatives for twenty years until his death in 1919. At the 1899 election, Colvin stood as an Independent Liberal rather than an official Liberal candidate.

From 1906 until 1909 he was the Liberal Party's junior whip.

Colvin served as the Chairman of Committees from 1910 to 1911. In the house, he had the nickname 'uncle Colvin', given to him by Thomas Wilford in 1899 when they both entered Parliament. He was Minister of Mines in 1912 in the Mackenzie cabinet.

Colvin was killed at 10 pm on 29 October 1919 by a tram as he left Parliament House. Parliament was still sitting, and the news reached the debating chamber within 15 minutes, which resulted in the immediate adjournment of proceedings.

== Notes ==
Political offices
Preceded by Thomas Wilford	Chairman of Committees of the House of Representatives; 1910–1911	Succeeded by Frederic Lang
New Zealand Parliament
Preceded by Patrick O'Regan	Member of Parliament for Buller; 1899–1919	Succeeded by Harry Holland
