= Mayor of Westport, New Zealand =

The Mayor of Westport officiated over the borough of Westport in on the West Coast of New Zealand's South Island. The office was created in 1873 when Westport was gazetted as a borough by the Nelson Provincial Council, and ceased with the 1989 local government reforms, when Westport Borough, Buller County and Inangahua County merged to form Buller District. The first mayor of Westport was James Wilson Humphrey.

== List of mayors ==
The following is a complete list of the mayors of Westport:

	Name	Portrait	Term of office
1	James Wilson Humphrey		1873–1874
2	Robert Whyte		1874–1876
3	John Munro		1876–1878
(2)	Robert Whyte (2nd time)		1878
4	William Reeve Haselden		1878–1880
(3)	John Munro (2nd time)		1880–1882
(4)	William Reeve Haselden (2nd time)		1882–1884
5	John Hughes		1884–1889
6	James Suisted		1889–1890
7	John Marshall		1890–1892
(6)	James Suisted (2nd time)		1892–1894
8	Hans Larsen		1894–1898
9	James Colvin		1898–1900
10	James Scanlon		1900–1903
11	Samuel James Riley		1903–1904
12	Fergus Ferguson Munro		1904–1905
13	George Hargreaves Gothard		1905–1908
14	James Horace Greenwood		1908–1913
15	Arthur Leaver		1913–1920
16	John Menzies		1920–1926
17	Charles Greenland		1926
18	James Hamilton Harkness		1927–1933
19	John Kilkenny		1933–1939
20	John Robertson		1939–1953
21	James Hunter		1953–1956
22	John Watson		1956–1968
23	Bill Craddock		1968–1977
24	Jack Dellaca		1977–1983
25	Pat O'Dea		1983–1989
