= Fish and Chip Brigade =

Nickname for group of New Zealand Labour politicians

The December 1980 photo that gave the group its name (from left): Lange, Bassett, Douglas, and Moore

The Fish and Chip Brigade was a humorous name given to four leading members of the New Zealand Labour Party who became senior members in the Fourth Labour Government (1984–1990). The politicians in the 'brigade' were future Prime Ministers David Lange and Mike Moore, future Minister of Finance Roger Douglas, and future Minister of Health and Local Government Dr. Michael Bassett.

The epithet, originally used from 1980 as a term of contempt by the then ruling National Party, came about after a newspaper photograph was published showing the four politicians tucking into a meal of takeaway fish and chips after a failed leadership coup in which they had attempted to replace then Labour Party leader, Bill Rowling, with Lange on 12 December 1980. The photograph, taken by Geoff Dale for The New Zealand Herald, instantly became an iconic image of New Zealand politics. The term is still used in a derogatory way by some sectors of New Zealand, in particular in reference to the hard-line neoliberal economic policies of the Fourth Labour Government, which became known as "Rogernomics". In this context, the name of Labour minister and future Minister for State Owned Enterprises Richard Prebble is also frequently added to those of the four politicians in the photograph. Prebble was present at the time but is not seen in the photo itself. A long standing rumour is that Moore was not expected to be present, but after smelling the fish and chips whilst walking down the corridor, he decided to join in.

The fish and chips were purchased at Molesworth Fish Supply on Molesworth Street, across the road from Parliament House. The shop was demolished in 2003 to make way for the Kate Sheppard Apartments. It had been slated for demolition in the late 1980s, but its significance was seen as such that Lange's successor as Prime Minister, Geoffrey Palmer, stepped in to save it. At the time of its closure it was still frequented by Prebble, the last member of the grouping still in Parliament.

== See also ==
- Politics of New Zealand
