= Tania Ka'ai =

New Zealand education academic

- Other name: Tania Kaai-Oldman
- Education: University of Waikato
- Scientific career
- Workplaces: Auckland University of Technology
- Thesis: Te tātari i te kaupapa (1995)
- Notable students: Diane Charlie-Puna; Hana O'Regan

Tania Marie Ka'ai (born 1957), sometimes known as Tania Kaai-Oldman, is a New Zealand education academic. She is a full professor of language revitalisation at the Auckland University of Technology.

== Academic career ==
Ka'ai was born in Auckland, and is affiliated with Ngāi Tahu and Ngāti Porou. She trained as a primary school teacher, and then earned a Bachelor of Education, and a Master of Philosophy. Ka'ai earned a 1995 education PhD from the University of Waikato, with a thesis titled ' Te tātari i te kaupapa' , which looked at ways the New Zealand qualifications framework could be used as a tool for indigenous knowledge to be integrated and recognised as a valid part of the education system in New Zealand. In 1996 Ka'ai became Foundation Chair of the Department of Māori Studies at the University of Otago, followed by Dean of the School of Māori, Pacific & Indigenous Studies, from which she was stood down in contentious circumstances, Ka'ai moved to the Auckland University of Technology with John Moorfield. Notable students include Diane Charlie-Puna and Hana O'Regan.

Ka'ai's research is centred on learning of indigenous languages (particularly te reo) in formal and semi-formal educational settings. She is a strong advocate for te reo being compulsory in New Zealand schools.

Ka'ai is a director of Te Ipukarea Research Institute, the National Māori Language Institute, at AUT since 2008. She is also a director of Te Whare o Rongomaurikura, the Centre for Language Revitalisation, since 2011.

Ka'ai developed a training programmer for the Te Kohanga Reo National Trust, was national co-ordinator of a parenting programme for the Māori Women’s Welfare League, has assessed grants for the Health Research Council, and was on the editorial board for He Pūkenga Kōrero – A Journal of Māori Studies for six years from 1997. Ka'ai was part of the Māori Reference Group for the Foundation of Research, Science and Technology, and for the Tertiary Education Commission.

== Selected works ==
- Ka'ai, Tania. Introduction to Māori culture and society. Longman, 2004.
- Ka'ai, Tania M., and Rawinia Higgins. "Te ao Māori–Māori world-view." Ki Te Whaiao–An Introduction to Māori Culture and Society. Auckland: Pearson Education (2004): 13–25.
- Jenkins, Kuni, and Tania Ka’ai. "Maori education: A cultural experience and dilemma for the state–a new direction for Maori society." The politics of learning and teaching in Aotearoa–New Zealand (1994): 79–148.
- Ka’ai, Tania. "Te hiringa taketake: Mai i te Kohanga Reo i te kura= Maori pedagogy: te Kohanga Reo and the transition to school." MSc Thesis, ResearchSpace@ Auckland, 1990.
- Ka'ai, Tania. "Te mana o te reo me ngā tikanga: Power and politics of the language." (2004).

== Personal life ==
Ka'ai is of Ngāti Porou, Ngāi Tahu, Native Hawaiian, Cook Island Māori, and Samoan descent.
