= Ken Shirley =

New Zealand politician

Kenneth Lex Shirley (born 12 August 1950) is a former New Zealand politician. He was a member of the ACT New Zealand party, although was previously a member and Cabinet minister of the Labour Party.

== Early life ==
Shirley was born on 12 August 1950, the son of World War II veteran Wallace Keown Shirley. He was educated at Heretaunga College in Upper Hutt, and went on to study at Victoria University of Wellington, graduating with a Bachelor of Science degree in 1975. He became a resources manager at the Nelson Catchment Board. He and his wife Jenny had two children.

== Member of Parliament ==
New Zealand Parliament
Years	Term	Electorate	List	Party
1984–1987	41st	Tasman		Labour
1987–1990	42nd	Tasman		Labour
1996–1999	45th	List	3	ACT
1999–2002	46th	List	2	ACT
2002–2005	47th	List	7	ACT

He joined the Labour Party in 1977 after moving to Richmond. In 1978 he became the secretary of the Tasman electorate committee. A year later he became the secretary of the Tasman campaign committee. When Tasman MP, and former Labour leader, Bill Rowling announced his retirement Shirley contested the nomination to replace him. From a field of seven (including John Blincoe, Annette King and Stephen Rainbow) he was selected as Labour's candidate.

Shirley first entered Parliament in the 1984 election, when he stood as the Labour Party candidate in the Tasman electorate. At the time, there was considerable tension in the Labour Party over the policies of the Minister of Finance, Roger Douglas – the policies were based around economic deregulation and free trade, and traditionalists saw them as a betrayal of the party's left-wing roots. Shirley aligned himself with the faction that supported Douglas. Shirley was not a member of the faction's so-called "Troika" (consisting of Douglas, Richard Prebble, and David Caygill), but was nevertheless a notable supporter of the reforms Douglas promoted.

=== Cabinet minister ===
Eventually, the Prime Minister, David Lange, fired Douglas as finance minister and then himself resigned. In the re-arrangement that followed, Shirley briefly held Cabinet rank as Minister of Fisheries, Associate Minister of Agriculture, Associate Minister of Forestry, and Associate Minister of Health. He lost these positions when the Labour Party was defeated in the 1990 election. Shirley himself lost his Tasman seat to National's Nick Smith, leaving him outside Parliament.

=== ACT New Zealand ===
When Douglas and his allies created the ACT New Zealand party, Shirley was involved. In ACT's first electoral campaign, the 1996 election, Shirley was ranked in third place on the ACT party list, and re-entered Parliament as a list MP.

He has previously served as ACT's deputy leader, and in 2004, he was one of four candidates to seek the party's leadership after the retirement of Richard Prebble.

On the retirement of Jonathan Hunt, he sought election as Speaker of the House of Representatives, but placed third behind Margaret Wilson and Clem Simich.

He remained a list MP until the 2005 election, in which only two ACT MPs were returned.

== Post-parliamentary career ==
In May 2006, Shirley was appointed Executive Director of Organics Aotearoa New Zealand (OANZ), the peak industry body representing the organic sector, which is charged with implementing a strategy to boost New Zealand's organic production to $1 billion by 2013.

In July 2007 the Researched Medicines Industry Association, a pharmaceuticals industry group, announced that Shirley was to be their new Chief Executive Officer, an appointment he took up in September 2007.

From July 2010 to 2018, he was the chief executive of the Road Transport Forum (RTF), representing road transport interests.

Political offices
Preceded by Colin Moyle	Minister of Fisheries; 1990	Succeeded by Doug Kidd
New Zealand Parliament
Preceded by Bill Rowling	Member of Parliament for Tasman; 1984–1990	Succeeded by Nick Smith
