= 1883 Inangahua by-election =

New Zealand by-election

The 1883 Inangahua by-election was a by-election held on 14 May 1883 during the 8th New Zealand Parliament in the West Coast electorate of Inangahua.

The by-election was caused by the resignation of the incumbent MP Thomas S. Weston. The by-election was won by Edward Shaw.

He was opposed by Edward Wakefield, who opposed the Government. Wakefield got large majorities at Brunnerton and Black's Point.

== Results ==
The following table gives the election result:

1883 Inangahua by-election
| Party | Candidate | Votes | % | ±% |
|---|---|---|---|---|
| Independent | Edward Shaw | 826 | 51.43 | |
| Independent | Edward Wakefield | 780 | 48.57 | |
| Turnout | | 1606 | | |
| Majority | | 46 | 2.86 | |
