= 1893 Inangahua by-election =

New Zealand by-election

- 8 June 1893
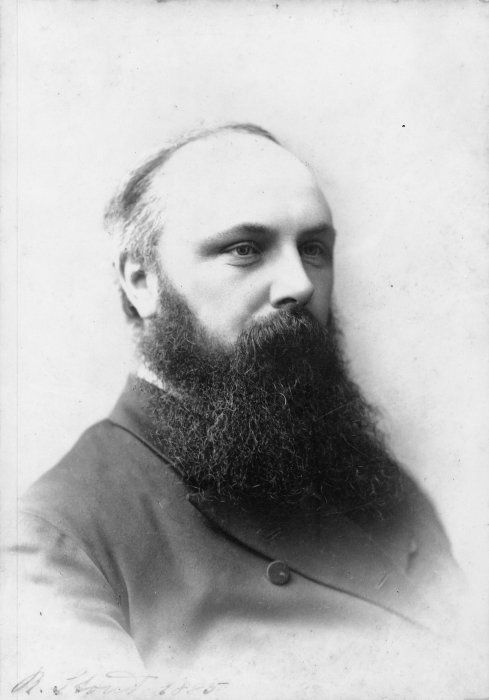

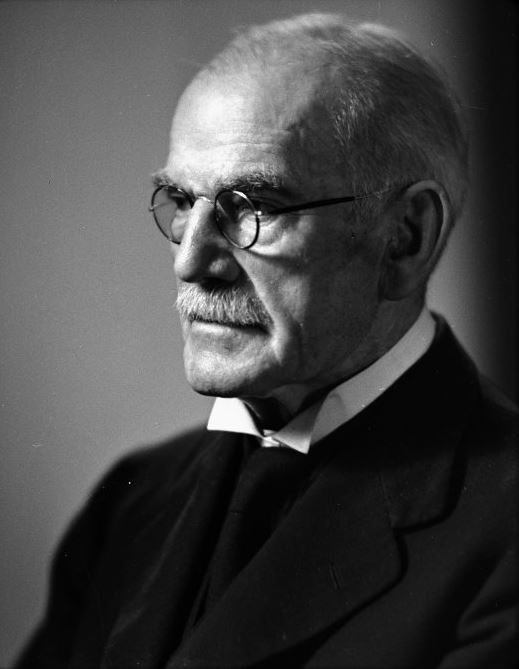
Candidate	Sir Robert Stout	Patrick O'Regan
Party	Liberal	Liberal
Popular vote	1,899	788
Percentage	70.67	29.33
Member before election
Richard Reeves
Independent
Elected Member
Robert Stout
Liberal

The Inangahua by-election of 1893 was a by-election held on 8 June 1893 during the 11th New Zealand Parliament in the West Coast seat of Inangahua.

The by-election was held because of the bankruptcy of the previous member of parliament Richard Reeves who had won the seat by just one vote.

This election saw Robert Stout, a twice former premier, who had been out of parliament since 1887 return under the newly organised New Zealand Liberal Party. Patrick O'Regan would also stand for the New Zealand Liberal Party in later years and won the seat of Inangahua at the 1893 New Zealand general election. This was the last by-election (or general election) in New Zealand held before the introduction of universal suffrage.

== Results ==
The following table gives the election results:

1893 Inangahua by-election
Party	Candidate	Votes	%	±%
Liberal	Robert Stout	1,899	70.67	
Liberal	Patrick O'Regan	788	29.33	
Majority		611	41.36	
Turnout		2,687		
