= Patrick O'Regan (politician) =

New Zealand politician

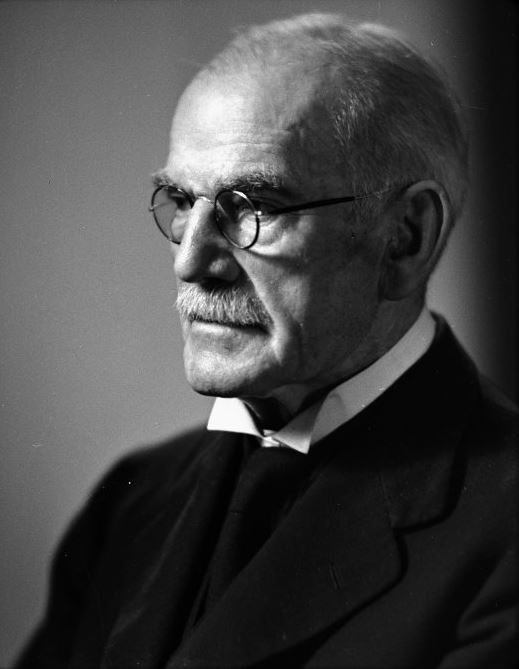
- O'Regan c. 1940

Member of the New Zealand Parliament for Inangahua
- In office 1893–1896
- Preceded by: Robert Stout
- Succeeded by: Constituency abolished

Member of the New Zealand Parliament for Buller
- In office 1896–1899
- Preceded by: Roderick McKenzie
- Succeeded by: James Colvin

Personal details
- Born: Patrick Joseph O'Regan; 6 February 1869 Charleston, New Zealand
- Died: 24 April 1947 (aged 78) Wellington, New Zealand
- Party: Liberal
- Spouse: Clara Emma Haycock (m. 1898)
- Children: 6
- Relatives: Rolland O'Regan (son); Tipene O'Regan (grandson); Hana O'Regan (great-granddaughter)

Patrick Joseph O'Regan (6 February 1869 – 24 April 1947) was a Member of Parliament for Inangahua and Buller, in the South Island of New Zealand. He was later appointed to the Legislative Council.

== Early life ==
O'Regan was born in Charleston, on the West Coast of New Zealand to Patrick O'Regan (an Irish immigrant and goldminer) and his wife Mary.

== Political career ==
New Zealand Parliament
Years	Term	Electorate	Party
1893–1896	12th	Inangahua	Liberal
1896–1899	13th	Buller	Liberal

O'Regan represented Inangahua (1893–1896) and Buller (1896–1899) in the New Zealand House of Representatives. He was defeated in the 1899 election when he stood for re-election in Buller.

He was involved with the Knights of Labour and Henry George's Single Tax Movement. In 1896, O'Regan introduced the Proportional Representation Bill into Parliament: it failed to carry the second reading by only 6 votes.

A lawyer by profession, O'Regan represented striking workers in 1913 and conscientious objectors charged with sedition in World War I.

O'Regan supported Labour's Peter Fraser in the 1918 by-election in Wellington Central and Harry Holland in the 1918 by-election in Wellington North. However, he did not join the Labour Party.

O'Regan was made a judge of the Court of Arbitration in 1937 and a member of the Legislative Council on 9 September 1946 and he held that position for the few months until his death in Wellington on 24 April 1947.

He was the father of surgeon and activist Rolland O'Regan.

New Zealand Parliament
Preceded by Robert Stout	Member of Parliament for Inangahua; 1893–1896	Constituency abolished
Preceded by Roderick McKenzie	Member of Parliament for Buller; 1896–1899	Succeeded by James Colvin
