= P. H. Matthews =

New Zealand politician (1903–1967)

Pressly Hemingway Matthews
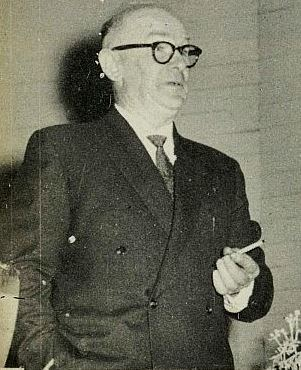

2nd Leader of the Social Credit Party
- In office 8 May 1960 – 13 May 1962
- Deputy: John O'Brien
- Preceded by: Wilfrid Owen
- Succeeded by: Vernon Cracknell

Personal details
- Born: 21 February 1903 New Zealand
- Died: 25 September 1967 (aged 64) Tākaka, New Zealand
- Party: Social Credit

Pressly Hemingway Matthews (21 February 1903 – 25 September 1967) was a New Zealand politician and, from 1960 to 1962, the second leader of New Zealand's Social Credit Party.

== Biography ==
Matthews was the only son of David Pressly Matthews (1854–1937). His mother was a daughter of Janet Simpson, a resident of Nelson. His father was from Dunedin and worked for the Otago Daily Times before he became a contractor during the gold boom in Paeroa and Waihi. The family moved to Wellington in 1905 where his father had a chain of butcher shops. His father farmed in Tākaka from 1918 to 1936.

Matthews became leader of the Social Credit Party at the party's annual conference in Wellington in May 1960 for the 1960 general election. The campaign opening was a disaster as he altered his address just before the opening meeting, and three candidates missed the nomination deadline. He was replaced by Vernon Cracknell in 1962. Spiro Zavos describes Presley [sic] Matthews as an obscure (even to Social Crediters) leader.

Matthews married Euphemia "Phemie" Suckling at St Andrew's Church in Christchurch on 21 August 1929. His wife was from Tai Tapu outside of Christchurch. The reception was held at the Masonic Hall in Gloucester Street.

Matthews had been a broadcasting technician and unionist in Auckland; he was first president (1934) of the Radio Workers Union and worker's representative on the Arbitration Court. He was also a local activist in Orakei, and had been in the Labour Party for many years until he resigned in 1939.

About 1951 he moved to Tākaka to farm, and formed a branch of Social Credit. He stood in the Buller electorate in the 1957 election and 1960 election, coming third each time; and also stood in the Buller 1962 by-election. He was active with many organisations in Tākaka.

In May 1960 Matthews was elected party leader. His 1960 manifesto proposed policies such as introducing a Bill of Rights to limit the powers of Government, free travel to pensioners on Government-owned services outside of holiday periods, rationalising trading hours and holding a referendum on the liquor licensing debate.

Aged 64, Matthews committed suicide with a gun in Tākaka on 25 September 1967.
