= 1980 New Zealand Labour Party leadership election =

New Zealand party leadership election

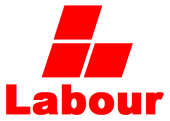
- 12 December 1980
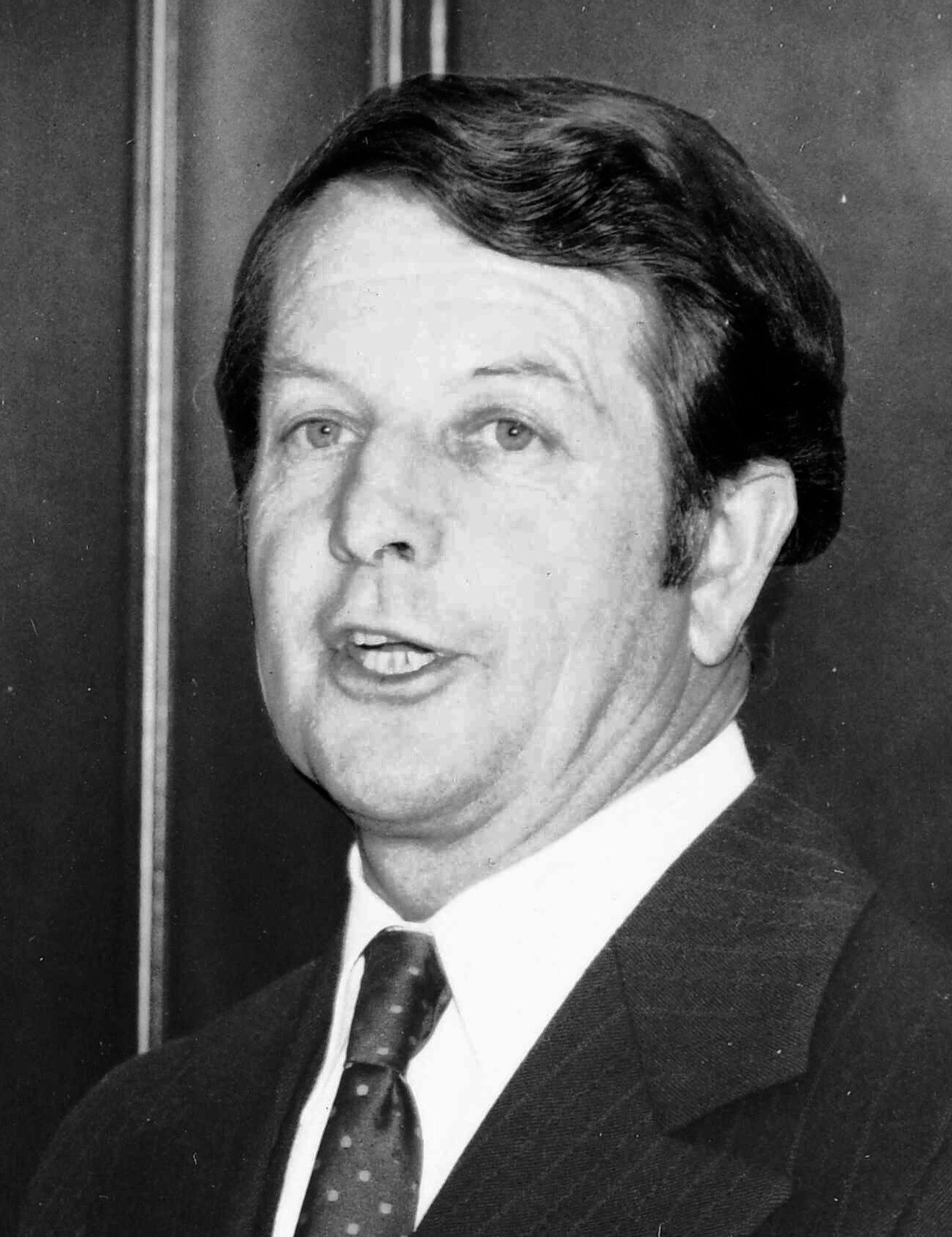

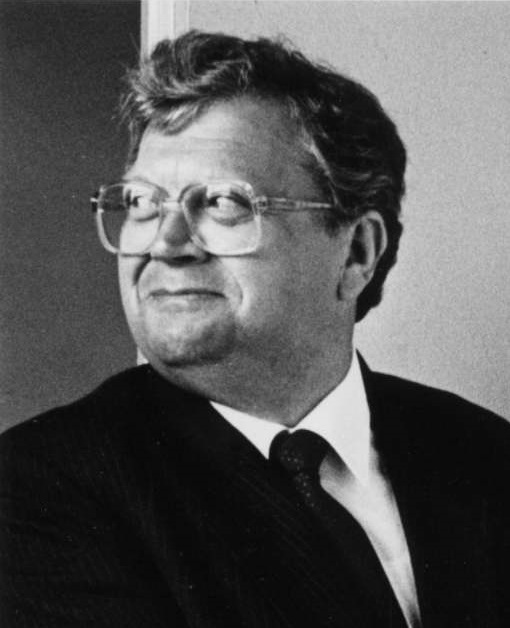
Candidate	Bill Rowling	David Lange
Popular vote	19	18
Percentage	51.40%	49.60%
Leader before election
Bill Rowling
Leader after election
Bill Rowling

The 1980 New Zealand Labour Party leadership election was held on 12 December 1980 to determine the leadership of the New Zealand Labour Party. The leadership was retained by former Prime Minister Bill Rowling, who had led the party for the last six years.

== Background ==
Rowling was already seriously considering resigning from politics altogether. After the 1978 election, it was clear that his days as leader were numbered and a leadership challenge was imminent. Earlier in 1980 Rowling sacked Roger Douglas from his shadow cabinet as consumer affairs and transport spokesperson for releasing an unauthorised alternative budget, fuelling prospects of a leadership challenge from Douglas' friend David Lange. Many were also weary of the fact that Labour was still polling well below National and just barely ahead of the Social Credit Party, who reached their popularity zenith during the East Coast Bays by-election.

== Candidates ==
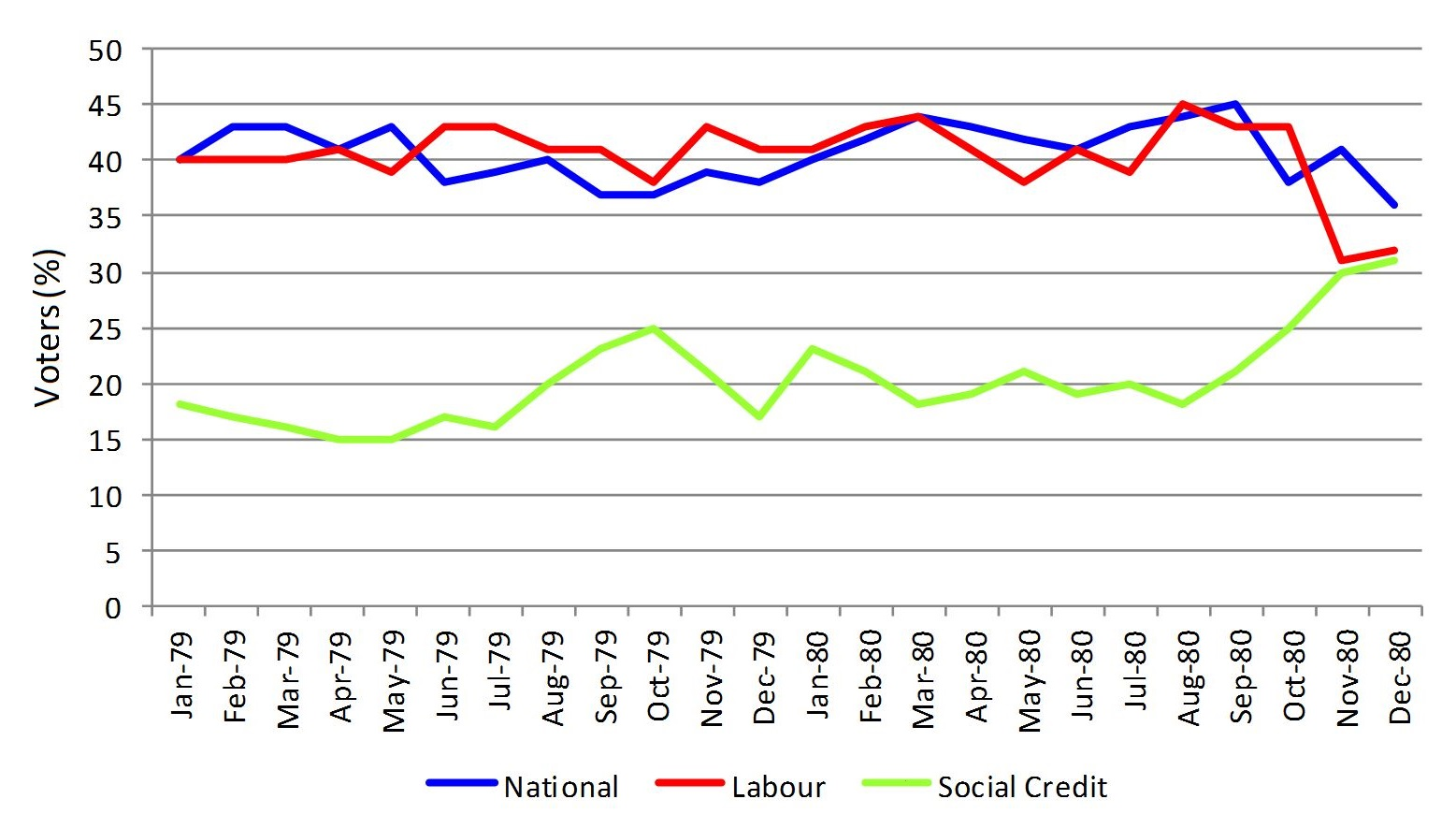
Poor polling results helped instigate a challenge to Rowling.

=== Bill Rowling ===
Bill Rowling had been leader for six years including as prime minister in 1974–75 despite Labour defeats in the 1975 and 1978 elections. However, he was able to claim a moral victory in the latter where Labour polled more votes overall than National, although they won fewer seats. His contemporaries argued that Labour's losses reflected badly on Rowling himself, despite making a substantial effort in rebuilding the party's membership during its time in opposition. Also, the fact that Rowling lacked the backing of the trade unions was crippling in Labour's circles and hampered his leverage in party structure.

=== David Lange ===
After entering parliament in a by-election that received much media attention and helped propel him to the deputy leadership of the Labour Party in 1979, Lange became Labour's rising star. Lange was Shadow Minister for Social Welfare from 1978 to 1979 and since 1979 had been Deputy Leader of the Opposition, Shadow Attorney-General, Shadow Minister of Justice and Shadow Minister of Pacific Island Affairs. Lange had always been a critic of Rowling and came "to resent the bloody-mindedness with which he clung to the leadership."

== Result ==
A caucus vote was held on 12 December 1980 where half the attendees supported a leadership change, and the other half opposed. After a silent pause, Rowling added that he too opposed, bringing the total votes for himself to 19 and enabling him to cling on to the party's leadership by a single vote.

=== Leadership ballot ===
Candidate	Votes	%
Bill Rowling	19	51.40
David Lange	18	48.60
Majority	1	2.70
Turnout	37	—N/a

== How each MP voted ==
A list of each MP's vote.

MP	Leader Vote
Basil Arthur	Rowling
Ron Bailey	Lange
Michael Bassett	Lange
Mary Batchelor	Lange
Kerry Burke	Rowling
David Butcher	Rowling
David Caygill	Rowling
Gordon Christie	Rowling
Fraser Colman	Rowling
Mick Connelly	Lange
Mel Courtney	Lange
Roger Douglas	Lange
Arthur Faulkner	Lange
Warren Freer	Rowling
Fred Gerbic	Rowling
Bruce Gregory	Lange
Ann Hercus	Rowling
Jonathan Hunt	Rowling
Eddie Isbey	Lange
John Kirk	Lange
David Lange	Lange
Brian MacDonell	Lange
Russell Marshall	Rowling
Ralph Maxwell	Lange
Mike Moore	Lange
Geoffrey Palmer	Rowling
Richard Prebble	Lange
Paraone Reweti	Rowling
Jack Ridley	Lange
Stan Rodger	Rowling
Bill Rowling	Rowling
John Terris	Rowling
Whetu Tirikatene-Sullivan	Rowling
Bob Tizard	Rowling
Gerard Wall	Lange
Koro Wētere	Rowling
Trevor Young	Lange

Three MPs were not present. Both Frank O'Flynn and Joe Walding were overseas and Bill Fraser was absent due to illness. Given the closeness of the result, their presence could have changed the result. Walding was a Rowling supporter whilst O'Flynn was likely to back Lange. Fraser was also thought to have favoured a leadership change.

== Aftermath ==
Rowling remained leader until 1983. He was visibly wounded by the challenge and called Lange's supporters 'nakedly ambitious rats', which he refused to retract. Later, Lange and a group of his core supporters (Roger Douglas, Michael Bassett, Richard Prebble and Mike Moore) became known as the "Fish and Chip Brigade" due to a picture published at the time with the group (minus Prebble) eating Fish and chips in Douglas' office after the vote. The brigade blamed the loss on one 'turncoat' who switched allegiance at the last moment, later revealed to have been Koro Wētere.

Lange noted the lack of any ideological motives about the election to be odd, stating "It was a mixture of loyalty, distrust, calculation, idealism and opportunism which decided the vote". Following the coup attempt Lange resigned as deputy leader in January 1981 to offer himself for re-election as a vote of confidence. At Labour's first caucus meeting of the year he was re-elected as deputy leader.
