= Hana O'Regan =

Māori language advocate and academic

Hana O'Regan ONZM
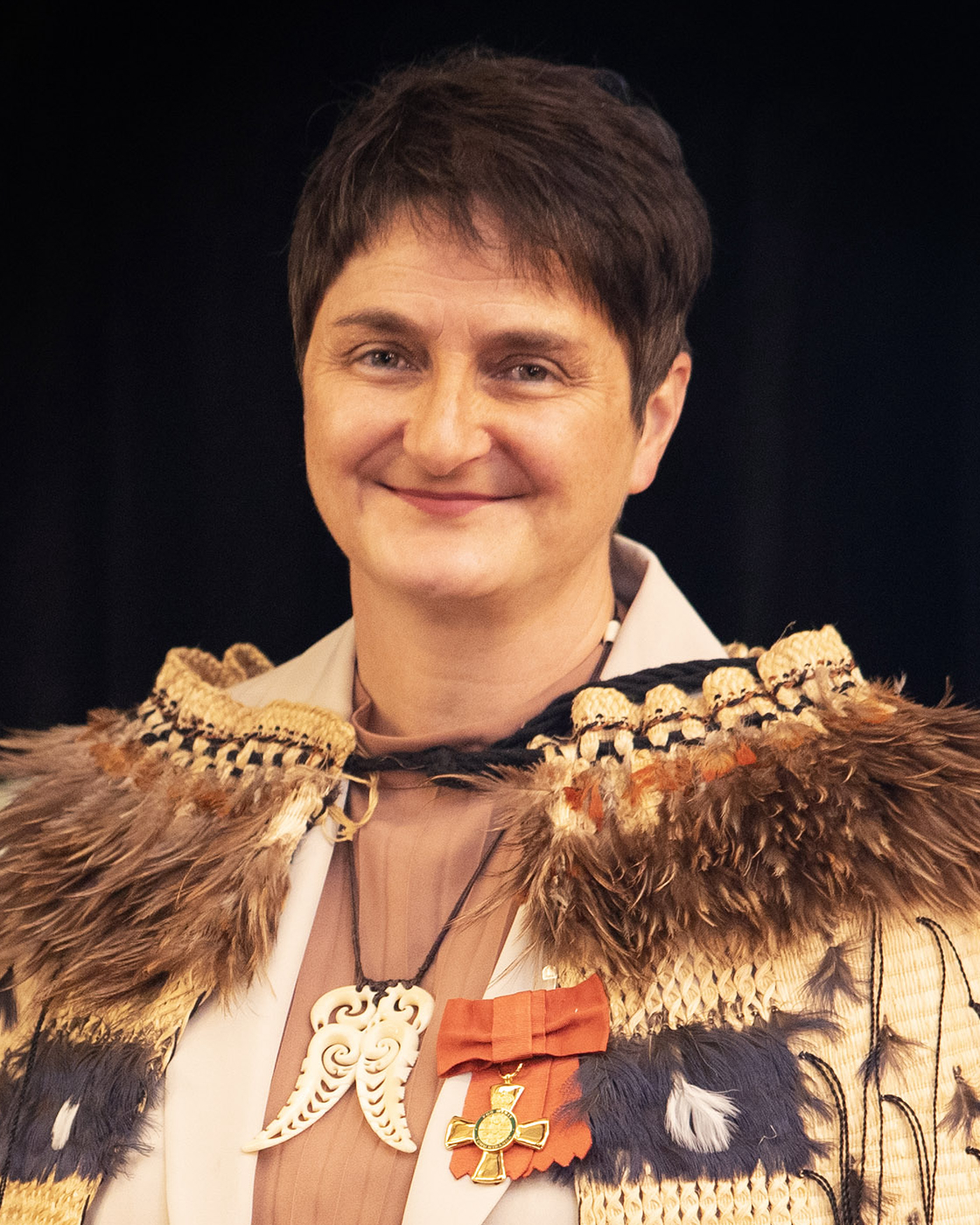
- O'Regan in 2024
- Born: Hana Merenea O'Regan; 1973 (age 52–53); Wellington, New Zealand
- Board member of: Māori Language Commission
- Relatives: Tipene O'Regan (father); Rolland O'Regan (grandfather); Patrick O'Regan (great-grandfather)

Academic background
- Education: Auckland University of Technology
- Thesis: Te tīmataka mai o te waiatataka mai o te reo (2017)
- Doctoral advisor: Tania Ka'ai

Academic work
- Discipline: Māori language
- Sub-discipline: Language revitalisation
- Institutions: Christchurch Polytechnic Institute of Technology

Hana Merenea O'Regan ONZM (born 1973) is a Māori language advocate and academic in New Zealand. She is a member of the Ngāi Tahu iwi (tribe).

== Early life and education ==
O'Regan was born in Wellington, the youngest of five children, to Tipene O'Regan, an academic, and Sandra O'Regan, a nurse. O'Regan attended Kelburn Normal School, Roseneath Primary School, and Auckland's Queen Victoria Māori Girls' Boarding School. She spent her final school year as an AFS exchange student at Chaeng Ron Wittiya School in Bangkok, Thailand.

O'Regan studied Māori studies and political science at Victoria University of Wellington and graduated with a BA in 1993. The following year, she completed a postgraduate diploma in Māori studies at the University of Otago. Her dissertation was entitled Mahu Kura Kai Tahu. In 1998, O'Regan completed a master's degree in Māori studies, also at Otago.

O'Regan later undertook doctoral studies at Auckland University of Technology, with Tania Ka'ai as her supervisor. She submitted her thesis, titled Te tīmataka mai o te waiatataka mai o te reo in 2016, and graduated PhD in July 2017.

== Career ==
In the early 1990s, O'Regan worked as a researcher for a number of organisation, including the Education Policy Division of Te Puni Kōkiri and Aoraki Consultant Services. In 1993, she was appointed assistant research officer for Te Tira Whakaemi Kōrero: Māori Research Unit at Victoria University and she also tutored in the Māori Studies Departments of both Victoria and Otago.

In 1997, O'Regan moved to Christchurch, where she was appointed head of the Māori language programme at CPIT (Christchurch Polytechnic Institute of Technology). After four years at that institution, she took up the position of manager of the Māori Language Unit of the Ngāi Tahu tribal organisation where she helped develop and lead the tribal language strategy. She returned to CPIT as Dean of Te Puna Wānaka, the new Faculty of Māori Studies, in 2006. She also held positions as kaiārahi – director of Māori and Pasifika, and director of the Student Services Division. In 2015, she was appointed general manager of oranga (well-being) for Ngāi Tahu.

O'Regan has been a member of the Māori Language Commission, Te Taura Whiri i te Reo Māori, since 2003. In 2015, O'Regan was appointed a member of the Flag Consideration Panel for the New Zealand flag referendums. She was appointed a member of the Waitangi Tribunal in June 2021 for a three-year term.

O'Regan is also a writer of poetry, waiata (songs), and non-fiction articles and papers. Much of her non-fiction writing is on Kāi Tahu tribal stories and histories.

In the 2024 New Year Honours, O'Regan was appointed an Officer of the New Zealand Order of Merit, for services to education.

=== Publications ===
- O'Regan, H. (2001). Ko Tahu, ko au: Kāi Tahu tribal identity. Christchurch: Horomaka Publishing.
- O'Regan, H., Kāretu, T., O'Regan, T., & Rangipunga, C. (2007). Kupu: a collection of contemporary Māori poetry. Christchurch: Ake Associates.
- O'Regan, H., Rangipunga, C., & Ake Associates. (2009). Kura kaumātua, he hokika mahara: Recalling the memories. Christchurch: Ake Associates.
