= Edward Shaw (politician) =

New Zealand politician (1847 or 1848 – 1889)

Member of the New Zealand Parliament for Inangahua
- In office 14 May 1883 – 24 June 1884
- Preceded by: Thomas S. Weston
- Succeeded by: Stuart Menteath

Personal details
- Born: Edward Shaw; 1847 or 1848
- Died: February 1889 (age 41) Hawthorn, Victoria, Australia
- Resting place: Boroondara General Cemetery
- Occupation: solicitor, judge

Edward Shaw (1847 or 1848 – February 1889) was a 19th-century member of the New Zealand Parliament.

Shaw was originally an English barrister. He worked at Bishop's school in Nelson. From there, he went to the Inangahua area of the Buller District on the West Coast as a resident warden and magistrate in Inangahua Junction, Reefton and Westport.

New Zealand Parliament
Years	Term	Electorate	Party
1883–1884	8th	Inangahua	Independent

He represented the Inangahua electorate from 1883 to 1884, following the resignation of Thomas S. Weston. At the 1884 general election he stood instead for the Wellington electorate of Te Aro, but was unsuccessful. After leaving politics in 1884, he later became a district judge. He later worked as a solicitor in Hawthorn near Melbourne. He died in Hawthorn and was buried at Boroondara General Cemetery on 23 February 1889 aged 41 years.

New Zealand Parliament
Preceded by Thomas S. Weston	Member of Parliament for Inangahua; 1883–1884	Succeeded by Stuart Menteath
