= Joseph Henry (politician) =

New Zealand politician

New Zealand Parliament
Years	Term	Electorate	Party
1876–1879	6th	Buller	Independent

Joseph Henry (1853–1894) was a 19th-century Member of Parliament from the West Coast, New Zealand.

He represented the Buller electorate from the 1876 election to 1879, when he was defeated by James Bickerton Fisher.

New Zealand Parliament
Preceded by Eugene O'Conor	Member of Parliament for Buller; 1876–1879	Succeeded by James Bickerton Fisher
