= Buller (electorate) =

Buller is a former New Zealand parliamentary electorate, from 1871 to 1972. It was represented by eleven Members of Parliament.

== Population centres ==
The 1870 electoral redistribution was undertaken by a parliamentary select committee based on population data from the 1867 New Zealand census. Eight sub-committees were formed, with two members each making decisions for their own province; thus members set their own electorate boundaries. The number of electorates was increased from 61 to 72, and Buller was one of the new electorates. The Buller electorate was created from areas that previously belonged to the Waimea and Westland electorates. Settlements located in the initial electorate area were Westport, Inangahua Junction, and Reefton. For the 1879 election, polling booths were in Westport, Charleston, Brighton, Addison's, Waimangaroa, Inangahua Junction, Lyell, and Karamea.

== History ==
The electorate's first representative was Eugene O'Conor, who was successful in the 1871 election, but he was defeated at the next election in 1876 by Joseph Henry. Henry in turn was defeated by James Bickerton Fisher at the 1879 election. Fisher retired at the end of the parliamentary term in 1881.

Fisher was succeeded by John Munro, who won the 1881 election. Munro was defeated at the next election in 1884 by Eugene O'Conor, who thus started his second period of representation. O'Conor, who joined the Liberal Party, was beaten in 1893 election by Roderick McKenzie. In the 1896 election, McKenzie successfully stood in the Motueka electorate.

Patrick O'Regan won the 1896 election in the Buller electorate. At the 1899 election, he was defeated by James Colvin, who held the electorate until his death in 1919.

From 1919 the Buller electorate was represented by two radical trade unionists from the coal mines of the West Coast, Harry Holland and Paddy Webb. Harry Holland and then Jerry Skinner died in office.

In 1972, the electorate was split into the West Coast and Tasman electorates.

=== Members of Parliament ===
The Buller electorate was represented by eleven MPs:

Key

Independent Liberal Independent Liberal Labour

Election	Winner
1871 election	Eugene O'Conor
1876 election	Joseph Henry
1879 election	James Bickerton Fisher
1881 election	John Munro
1884 election	Eugene O'Conor
1887 election	Eugene O'Conor
1890 election	Eugene O'Conor
1893 election	Roderick McKenzie
1896 election	Patrick O'Regan
1899 election	James Colvin
1902 election	James Colvin
1905 election	James Colvin
1908 election	James Colvin
1911 election	James Colvin
1914 election	James Colvin
1919 election	Harry Holland
1922 election	Harry Holland
1925 election	Harry Holland
1928 election	Harry Holland
1931 election	Harry Holland
1933 by-election	Paddy Webb
1935 election	Paddy Webb
1938 election	Paddy Webb
1943 election	Paddy Webb
1946 election	Jerry Skinner
1949 election	Jerry Skinner
1951 election	Jerry Skinner
1954 election	Jerry Skinner
1957 election	Jerry Skinner
1960 election	Jerry Skinner
1962 by-election	Bill Rowling
1963 election	Bill Rowling
1966 election	Bill Rowling
1969 election	Bill Rowling
(Electorate abolished 1972; see Tasman and West Coast)

== Election results ==
=== 1969 election ===
1969 general election: Buller
Party	Candidate	Votes	%	±%
Labour	Bill Rowling	8,319	53.36	+5.00
National	Ernie King	5,497	35.25	+0.58
Social Credit	D L Hodgkinson	1,774	11.37	
Majority		2,822	18.10	+4.57
Turnout		15,590	87.67	−0.31
Registered electors		17,782		

=== 1966 election ===
1966 general election: Buller
Party	Candidate	Votes	%	±%
Labour	Bill Rowling	6,510	48.36	−3.92
National	Ernie King	4,668	34.67	−5.70
Social Credit	W P B Dobier	2,286	16.97	
Majority		1,822	13.53	+1.63
Turnout		13,464	87.98	−2.93
Registered electors		15,303		

=== 1963 election ===
1963 general election: Buller
Party	Candidate	Votes	%	±%
Labour	Bill Rowling	7,338	52.28	+7.30
National	Ernie King	5,667	40.37	+1.21
Social Credit	E Wells	1,033	7.35	
Majority		1,671	11.90	+8.50
Turnout		14,038	90.91	+11.51
Registered electors		15,440		

=== 1962 by-election ===
1962 Buller by-election
Party	Candidate	Votes	%	±%
Labour	Bill Rowling	5,242	44.98	
National	Ernie King	4,846	41.58	+5.58
Social Credit	P. H. Matthews	1,566	13.44	−1.36
Majority		396	3.40	
Informal votes		37	0.32	
Turnout		11,691	79.40	−12.70
Registered electors		14,724		
Labour hold		Swing		

=== 1960 election ===
1960 general election: Buller
Party	Candidate	Votes	%	±%
Labour	Jerry Skinner	6,380	47.58	−3.11
National	Ernie King	4,834	36.05	
Social Credit	P. H. Matthews	1,984	14.79	+5.70
Independent	Oscar Bergh	210	1.56	
Majority		1,546	11.53	−6.41
Turnout		13,408	91.48	−1.05
Registered electors		14,656		

=== 1957 election ===
1957 general election: Buller
Party	Candidate	Votes	%	±%
Labour	Jerry Skinner	7,563	50.69	−7.07
National	Norman Leon Bensemann	4,886	32.74	
Social Credit	P. H. Matthews	1,357	9.09	
Majority		2,677	17.94	−7.63
Turnout		13,806	92.53	+2.00
Registered electors		14,920		

=== 1954 election ===
1954 general election: Buller
Party	Candidate	Votes	%	±%
Labour	Jerry Skinner	7,559	57.76	+3.11
National	Derisly Manwell Carson	4,211	32.17	
Social Credit	W T Eggleston	1,319	10.07	
Majority		3,348	25.57	+16.28
Turnout		13,089	90.53	+4.53
Registered electors		14,458		

=== 1951 election ===
1951 general election: Buller
Party	Candidate	Votes	%	±%
Labour	Jerry Skinner	7,215	54.65	−3.42
National	Phil McDonald	5,988	45.35	+3.42
Majority		1,227	9.29	−6.84
Turnout		13,203	86.00	−6.31
Registered electors		15,352		

=== 1949 election ===
1949 general election: Buller
Party	Candidate	Votes	%	±%
Labour	Jerry Skinner	7,941	58.07	−2.71
National	Phil McDonald	5,735	41.93	+2.71
Majority		2,206	16.13	−5.42
Turnout		13,676	92.31	−2.57
Registered electors		14,814		

=== 1946 election ===
1946 general election: Buller
Party	Candidate	Votes	%	±%
Labour	Jerry Skinner	8,211	60.78	
National	Phil McDonald	5,299	39.22	
Majority		2,912	21.55	
Turnout		13,510	94.88	
Registered electors		14,239		

=== 1933 by-election ===
1933 Buller by-election
Party	Candidate	Votes	%	±%
Labour	Paddy Webb	4,799	68.10	
Liberal–Labour	H. Ian Simson	2,249	31.90	
Informal votes		343	4.86	+3.14
Majority		2,550	36.18	
Turnout		7,048	71.36	−17.66

=== 1931 election ===
1931 general election: Buller
Party	Candidate	Votes	%	±%
Labour	Harry Holland	6,136	71.01	
Reform	John Menzies	2,505	28.99	
Majority		3,631	42.02	
Informal votes		151	1.72	
Turnout		8,792	89.02	
Registered electors		9,876		

=== 1928 election ===
1928 general election: Buller
Party	Candidate	Votes	%	±%
Labour	Harry Holland	5,988	70.33	+11.12
Reform	Dugald Macdonald Robertson	2,371	27.85	
Majority		3,617	42.48	+23.20
Informal votes		154	1.80	+0.95
Turnout		8,513	90.84	−3.08
Registered electors		9,371		

=== 1925 election ===
1925 general election: Buller
Party	Candidate	Votes	%	±%
Labour	Harry Holland	4,704	59.21	−0.59
Reform	Charles Beilby	3,172	39.92	
Majority		1,532	19.28	−1.60
Informal votes		68	0.85	−0.45
Turnout		7,944	93.92	+2.12
Registered electors		8,458		

=== 1922 election ===
1922 general election: Buller
Party	Candidate	Votes	%	±%
Labour	Harry Holland	4,413	59.80	+2.10
Reform	John Menzies	2,872	38.91	
Majority		1,541	20.88	+4.56
Informal votes		94	1.27	+0.36
Turnout		7,379	91.80	−1.31
Registered electors		8,038		

=== 1919 election ===
1919 general election: Buller
Party	Candidate	Votes	%	±%
Labour	Harry Holland	3,545	57.70	
Liberal	Denis Quinlan O'Brien	2,542	41.38	
Majority		1,003	16.32	
Informal votes		56	0.91	−0.45
Turnout		6,143	93.11	+11.81
Registered electors		6,597		

=== 1914 election ===
1914 general election
Party	Candidate	Votes	%	±%
Liberal	James Colvin	3,594	67.00	
Reform	George Powell	1,399	26.08	
Social Democrat	Hugh Gillen	371	6.91	
Majority		2,195	40.92	
Informal votes		73	1.36	
Turnout		5,364	81.30	
Registered electors		6,597		

=== 1899 election ===
1899 general election: Buller
Party	Candidate	Votes	%	±%
Independent Liberal	James Colvin	2,846	55.37	
Liberal	Patrick O'Regan	2,294	44.63	
Majority		552	10.74	
Turnout		5,140	87.68	
Registered electors		5,862		

=== 1893 election ===
1893 general election: Buller
Party	Candidate	Votes	%	±%
Liberal	Roderick McKenzie	1,817	53.11	
Independent	Eugene O'Conor	1,604	46.89	
Majority		213	6.23	
Turnout		3,421	84.39	
Registered electors		4,054		

=== 1879 election ===
1879 general election: Buller
Party	Candidate	Votes	%	±%
Independent	James Bickerton Fisher	410	55.56	
Independent	Joseph Henry	328	44.44	
Majority		82	11.11	
Informal votes		19	2.51	
Turnout		757	66.00	
Registered electors		1,147		
