= 1962 Buller by-election =

New Zealand by-election

- 7 July 1962
- Turnout: 11,691 (79.40%)
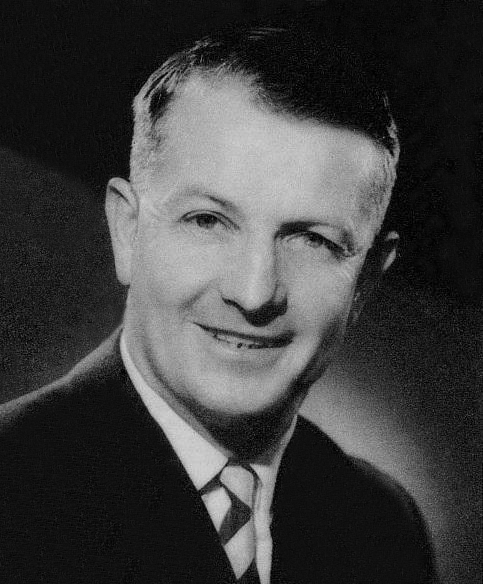

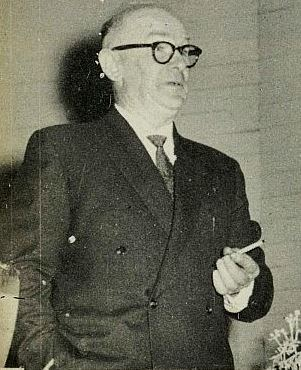
Candidate	Bill Rowling	Ernie King	P. H. Matthews
Party	Labour	National	Social Credit
Popular vote	5,242	4,846	1,566
Percentage	44.98	41.58	13.44
Member before election
Jerry Skinner
Labour
Elected Member
Bill Rowling
Labour

The Buller by-election 1962 was a by-election held in the Buller electorate in the West Coast during the term of the 33rd New Zealand Parliament, on 7 July 1962.

The by-election was caused by the death of incumbent MP Jerry Skinner of the Labour Party (and a likely future leader) on 26 April 1962. The by-election was won by Bill Rowling, also of the Labour Party (and a future leader). The Social Credit candidate P. H. Matthews was also the leader of the party.

== Date ==
The initial date of the by-election announced by the Prime Minister Keith Holyoake was 21 July, contrary to expectations it would be early to mid June, by extending the time allowed for the issue of the writ in order to coincide with another by-election in Timaru. The Leader of the Opposition Walter Nash criticized the decision saying it was a "nullification of democracy" and motivated to place the election after the budget to allow the government to spend its money electioneering. The Social Credit Party were also critical of the decision claiming National were frightened following its decreased majorities at the recent by-elections in Hurunui and Waitaki. The decision to delay was later threatened on legal grounds by the Labour Party who challenged it in the Supreme Court. The government backed down and changed the date to 7 July.

== Candidates ==
=== Labour ===
There were several names put forward as potential Labour nominees for the Labour Party candidacy:

- Mr M. Organ, a Labour Party member formerly of the Westport branch
- Robert Philp, the chairman of the Buller County Council
- Neville Pickering, the former MP for St Albans
- Claude Rielly, of the Takaka branch of the Labour Party
- Bill Rowling, Labour's candidate for Fendalton in 1960
- Terry Skinner, Secretary of the Southern Buller Labour Representation Committee (Jerry Skinner's son)
- Philip Skoglund, the former MP for Palmerston North and Minister of Education

Rielly declined the invitation to seek the nomination and Philp withdrew after he suffered a mild stroke. Rowling was chosen after winning a ballot of local party members at a meeting of party members in Murchison.

=== National ===
Two people sought the National Party candidature.

- Ernie King, a stud stock specialist from Appleby who was National's candidate for Buller in 1960
- Charles Mclntosh Robertson, a company manager from Westport

King was chosen as the National candidate after winning a ballot of members at a meeting in Motueka.

=== Social Credit ===
The Social Credit Party chose P. H. Matthews as their candidate. Matthews was leader of the party and had contested Buller in both 1957 and 1960.

== Campaign ==
The New Zealand Broadcasting Corporation announced there would be no pre-election addresses broadcast in the by-election but would have full coverage of the polling results.

== Results ==
The following table gives the election results:

1962 Buller by-election
Party	Candidate	Votes	%	±%
Labour	Bill Rowling	5,242	44.98	
National	Ernie King	4,846	41.58	+5.58
Social Credit	P. H. Matthews	1,566	13.44	−1.36
Majority		396	3.40	
Informal votes		37	0.32	
Turnout		11,691	79.40	−12.70
Registered electors		14,724		
Labour hold		Swing		
