= Remuera (electorate) =

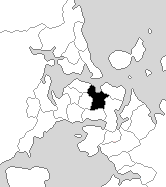
Remuera electorate boundaries between 1993 and 1996

Remuera is a former New Zealand parliamentary electorate, in the city of Auckland. It existed from 1938, when it replaced the Parnell electorate, until 1996. It was consistently held by members of the National Party.

== Population centres ==
The 1931 New Zealand census had been cancelled due to the Great Depression, so the 1937 electoral redistribution had to take ten years of population growth into account. The increasing population imbalance between the North and South Islands had slowed, and only one electorate seat was transferred from south to north. Five electorates were abolished, one former electorate (Onehunga) was re-established, and four electorates were created for the first time, including Remuera. The Remuera electorate replaced the Parnell electorate, covering almost exactly the same area as Parnell had since the 1927 electoral redistribution.

For the purposes of the country quota, the 1936 census had determined that the Remuera electorate was fully urban. The electorate comprised a number of east Auckland suburbs, most notably Remuera itself. The area is high-income, and has been represented by a succession of National Party MPs.

== History ==
The electorate existed from 1938 to 1996. The first representative was Bill Endean, who served from 1938 for one term to 1943. Endean was controversial within the National Party and in the party's 50-year history written by Barry Gustafson, it is remarked that in 1938, there was "some resistance to the National MP" in the Remuera electorate. His nomination for the planned 1941 general election only occurred after Sidney Holland had stepped in. The 1941 election was postponed due to the war, though, and Endean failed to get selected by the National Party for the 1943 election; Ronald Algie was chosen instead. Endean was overseas at the time of the selection, but even if he had been present, Gustafson believes that the "elderly, dull Endean would have been no match for the clever and witty Algie". Endean was the first sitting National MP who failed to get re-selected.

On election night 1987 a shock upset in the electorate was predicted on election night. Labour candidate Judith Tizard was initially predicted as the winner, but ultimately came 406 votes short after all votes were counted. Labour had never come remotely close to winning the seat before, even in high-tide elections. Labour's temporary surge amongst traditional National stalwarts caused Prime Minister David Lange to question the direction his government was taking under Rogernomics. In a 1996 interview he recalled, "That election night was a great revelation for me. That was an apprehension on my part that we had actually abandoned our constituency. And it set me to think what on earth have we done that we come within 400 votes of winning the true-blue seat of Remuera. And that struck me as being a dangerous flirtation, and an act of treachery to the people we were born to represent."

With the introduction of mixed-member proportional (MMP) representation in 1996, Remuera was included in the new electorate of Epsom.

=== Members of Parliament ===
Key

National

Election	Winner
1938 election	Bill Endean
1943 election	Ronald Algie
1946 election	Ronald Algie
1949 election	Ronald Algie
1951 election	Ronald Algie
1954 election	Ronald Algie
1957 election	Ronald Algie
1960 election	Ronald Algie
1963 election	Ronald Algie
1966 election	Allan Highet
1969 election	Allan Highet
1972 election	Allan Highet
1975 election	Allan Highet
1978 election	Allan Highet
1981 election	Allan Highet
1984 election	Doug Graham
1987 election	Doug Graham
1990 election	Doug Graham
1993 election	Doug Graham
(Electorate abolished in 1996; see Epsom)

== Election results ==
=== 1993 election ===
1993 general election: Remuera
Party	Candidate	Votes	%	±%
National	Doug Graham	12,584	59.94	+0.64
Alliance	Mary Tierney	3,965	18.88	
Labour	Peter Haynes	3,633	17.30	
McGillicuddy Serious	Kerry Hoole	347	1.65	+0.68
Christian Heritage	Joanne Phimster	247	1.17	
Natural Law	Graeme Lodge	129	0.61	
Defence Movement	Luke Holmes	86	0.40	
Majority		8,619	41.06	+6.02
Turnout		20,991	85.20	+0.65
Registered electors		24,636		

=== 1990 election ===
1990 general election: Remuera
Party	Candidate	Votes	%	±%
National	Doug Graham	11,777	59.30	+9.80
Labour	Carl Harding	4,409	22.20	
Green	Mark Fitzsimons	2,682	13.50	
NewLabour	Wayne Hope	599	3.01	
McGillicuddy Serious	Kerry Hoole	194	0.97	
Democrats	Thomas Keith Park	114	0.57	
Blokes Liberation Front	Russell Duulroo	85	0.42	
Majority		7,368	37.09	+35.04
Turnout		19,860	84.55	−3.25
Registered electors		23,487		

=== 1987 election ===
1987 general election: Remuera
Party	Candidate	Votes	%	±%
National	Doug Graham	9,770	49.50	+5.00
Labour	Judith Tizard	9,364	47.44	
Democrats	B F Clegg	319	1.61	
NZ Party	Sue Martin	175	0.88	
Revolutionary Army	Sibling Ward	107	0.54	
Majority		406	2.05	−14.98
Turnout		19,735	87.80	−2.73
Registered electors		22,477		

=== 1984 election ===
1984 general election: Remuera
Party	Candidate	Votes	%	±%
National	Doug Graham	9,102	44.50	
NZ Party	Kenneth Sandford	5,619	27.47	
Labour	Wayne Sellwood	4,914	24.02	
Social Credit	Thomas Keith Park	599	2.92	
Values	Cathryn Symons	217	1.06	
Majority		3,483	17.03	
Turnout		20,451	90.53	+5.84
Registered electors		22,590		

=== 1981 election ===
1981 general election: Remuera
Party	Candidate	Votes	%	±%
National	Allan Highet	9,360	53.75	−1.59
Labour	Judith Tizard	4,525	25.98	
Social Credit	Eddie Hagen	2,755	15.82	+3.83
Values	Jeanette Fitzsimons	475	2.72	−4.77
Independent	Malcolm Moses	189	1.08	
Liberal Democratic	B R Harker	107	0.61	
Majority		5,105	29.32	−4.26
Turnout		17,411	84.69	+28.91
Registered electors		20,557		

=== 1978 election ===
1978 general election: Remuera
Party	Candidate	Votes	%	±%
National	Allan Highet	9,511	55.34	−8.38
Labour	Lee Goffin	3,740	21.76	
Social Credit	Eddie Hagen	2,062	11.99	
Values	Jeanette Fitzsimons	1,288	7.49	
Christian Democratic	Tom Weal	338	1.96	
Right to Life	Patricia Sue Crowther	245	1.42	
Majority		5,771	33.58	−14.45
Turnout		17,184	55.78	−23.65
Registered electors		30,806		

=== 1975 election ===
1975 general election: Remuera
Party	Candidate	Votes	%	±%
National	Allan Highet	11,483	63.72	+4.08
Labour	G B Mead	2,827	15.68	
Values	Bill Davies	2,363	13.11	
Social Credit	Peggy Clark	809	4.48	−0.91
Right to Life	L D B Gee	483	2.68	
Alpha	C C Wallace	55	0.30	
Majority		8,656	48.03	+11.06
Turnout		18,020	79.43	−9.12
Registered electors		22,685		

=== 1972 election ===
1972 general election: Remuera
Party	Candidate	Votes	%	±%
National	Allan Highet	9,869	59.64	−7.19
Labour	Rex Stanton	3,751	22.67	
Values	Reg Clough	1,736	10.49	
Social Credit	Peggy Clark	893	5.39	+0.04
Independent	Clyde Campbell	237	1.43	
New Democratic	Bruce William Cox	59	0.35	
Majority		6,118	36.97	−2.06
Turnout		16,545	88.55	+1.12
Registered electors		18,684		

=== 1969 election ===
1969 general election: Remuera
Party	Candidate	Votes	%	±%
National	Allan Highet	12,153	66.83	+0.59
Labour	Hamish Keith	5,056	27.80	
Social Credit	Peggy Clark	974	5.35	−5.47
Majority		7,097	39.03	−4.65
Turnout		18,183	87.43	−3.80
Registered electors		20,795		

=== 1966 election ===
1966 general election: Remuera
Party	Candidate	Votes	%	±%
National	Allan Highet	10,127	66.42	
Labour	Bill Nairn	3,467	22.74	
Social Credit	Peggy Clark	1,651	10.82	+6.58
Majority		6,660	43.68	
Turnout		15,245	83.63	−4.04
Registered electors		18,227		

=== 1963 election ===
1963 general election: Remuera
Party	Candidate	Votes	%	±%
National	Ronald Algie	10,772	68.10	+0.06
Labour	Fred Goodall	3,771	23.84	
Social Credit	Peggy Clark	672	4.24	
Liberal	Owen Alfred Addison	602	3.80	
Majority		7,001	44.26	+3.56
Turnout		15,817	87.67	+0.26
Registered electors		18,041		

=== 1960 election ===
1960 general election: Remuera
Party	Candidate	Votes	%	±%
National	Ronald Algie	10,212	68.04	+5.06
Labour	Barry Gustafson	4,103	27.34	
Social Credit	Margaret Morley	692	4.61	
Majority		6,109	40.70	+9.81
Turnout		15,007	87.41	−5.11
Registered electors		17,167		

=== 1957 election ===
1957 general election: Remuera
Party	Candidate	Votes	%	±%
National	Ronald Algie	9,717	62.98	+3.85
Labour	Russell Penney	4,951	32.09	
Social Credit	Ethel Maude Wood	759	4.91	
Majority		4,766	30.89	+5.99
Turnout		15,427	92.52	+3.79
Registered electors		16,674		

=== 1954 election ===
1954 general election: Remuera
Party	Candidate	Votes	%	±%
National	Ronald Algie	8,415	59.13	−12.94
Labour	Bob Tizard	4,871	34.23	+6.31
Social Credit	Horace Leslie Richards	944	6.63	
Majority		3,544	24.90	−19.25
Turnout		14,230	88.73	+1.07
Registered electors		16,037		

=== 1951 election ===
1951 general election: Remuera
Party	Candidate	Votes	%	±%
National	Ronald Algie	8,727	72.07	+2.04
Labour	Bob Tizard	3,381	27.92	
Majority		5,346	44.15	+4.09
Turnout		12,108	87.66	−5.17
Registered electors		13,811		

=== 1949 election ===
1949 general election: Remuera
Party	Candidate	Votes	%	±%
National	Ronald Algie	8,878	70.03	+2.55
Labour	Hugh Watt	3,799	29.96	
Majority		5,079	40.06	+5.10
Turnout		12,677	92.83	+0.75
Registered electors		13,655		

=== 1946 election ===
1946 general election: Remuera
Party	Candidate	Votes	%	±%
National	Ronald Algie	8,512	67.48	+10.79
Labour	James Freeman	4,102	32.51	
Majority		4,410	34.96	+15.05
Turnout		12,614	92.08	−1.15
Registered electors		13,698		

=== 1943 election ===
1943 general election: Remuera
Party	Candidate	Votes	%	±%
National	Ronald Algie	11,907	56.69	
Labour	Martyn Finlay	7,724	36.77	
Democratic Labour	Leo Patrick McMahon	439	2.09	
People's Movement	Edward William Sinton	296	1.40	
Independent	Hugh Kendal	278	1.32	
Real Democracy	Suzanne Mabel Milne	165	0.78	
Informal votes		193	0.91	+0.11
Majority		4,183	19.91	
Turnout		21,002	93.23	+0.99
Registered electors		22,527		

=== 1938 election ===
1938 general election: Remuera
Party	Candidate	Votes	%	±%
National	Bill Endean	9,605	58.27	
Labour	Mary Dreaver	6,744	40.91	
Informal votes		132	0.80	
Majority		2,861	17.35	
Turnout		16,481	92.24	
Registered electors		17,866		
