= Chris Leitch (politician) =

New Zealand politician (died 2023)

11th Leader of the Social Credit Party
- In office 17 June 2018 – 20 January 2023
- Deputy: Amanda Vickers
- Preceded by: Stephnie de Ruyter

13th Deputy Leader of the Democratic Party
- In office 22 September 2013 – 17 June 2018
- Preceded by: John Pemberton
- Succeeded by: Amanda Vickers

Personal details
- Born: 1953 or 1954
- Died: 20 January 2023 (aged 70)
- Party: Social Credit
- Other political affiliations: Alliance (1991–1997)
- Spouse: Anne Wood
- Profession: Dance teacher

Christopher John Leitch (1953 or 1954 – 20 January 2023) was a New Zealand politician. He was the leader of the Social Credit Party from 2018 until his death in 2023.

== Biography ==
=== Early life and career ===
Leitch was interested in soccer and cricket as a child and at age 11 also became interested in dancing (also an interest of his parents) and danced first socially and then competitively. He won the Auckland region youth age division competitions and later was the winner of multiple national competitions between the age of 15 and 17. By the time he was 18 he began teaching dancing as well while still learning himself, being tutored by Maurice Taylor, one of New Zealand's leading dance examiners and fellow of the New Zealand Federal Association of Dance Teachers. Aged 20 Leitch moved to Whangārei where, with the help of his parents, he established his own dance studio named "The John Leitch Dance Studio" covering nine other Northland towns. He was a life member of the New Zealand Federal Association of Teachers of Dancing, which registered with the New Zealand Council of Dance and affiliated to both the equivalent Australian association and the Imperial Society of Teachers of Dancing in London.

=== Political career ===
Leitch joined the Social Credit Party in the early 1970s, "to try to make a difference" following his father's example. His first campaigning was for former Whangarei mayor Joyce Ryan, later becoming chairman of Social Credit's Whangarei Branch. He stood in the Whangarei electorate in 1984 for Social Credit and again in 1987 for the Democrat Party (a renamed Social Credit). After the 1984 election he was Social Credit's spokesman on industrial relations. By 1988 he was party spokesman for housing and co-led a nationwide campaign with party leader Neil Morrison to convince banks to cut mortgage interest rates. In 1988 he became President of the Democrat Party. As president, Leitch changed the party structure in 1989 from nineteen regions to seven divisions with the goal of spreading resources more fairly and giving members at the electorate level a greater say in policy development. The party would then hold seven divisional conferences a year instead of the previous three, in a bid to generate publicity for its policies. At the end of 1991 the Democrats joined an alliance of four parties (alongside the NewLabour Party, Mana Motuhake and the Greens) which became known as the Alliance.

He was selected to be the Alliance candidate at the 1992 Tamaki by-election caused by the resignation of Sir Robert Muldoon. The National government was unpopular at the time after reneging on several election pledges. Leitch campaigned well and was ahead in two of the three opinion polls conducted holding an eight-point lead over National Party candidate Clem Simich five days before election day. Leitch did not win the normally safe National seat, but reduced National's majority by 29.5% and pushed the Labour Party candidate into a distant third place, describing his near victory as a "miracle". Soon after his Tamaki campaign he stood as a candidate at the 1992 local-body elections for the newly created Auckland Regional Services Trust on the Alliance ticket and was successful. He remained a member of the trust until 1997 when he decided to retire from politics.

Leitch returned to politics ahead of the 2014 election, being elected as deputy leader of the Democrats in September 2013, and selected as candidate for the Whangarei electorate. At the 2017 election he stood again in Whangarei and was second on the list.

In 2015 Leitch was the Northland organiser of a campaign opposing the Trans-Pacific Partnership, and later an organiser for a similar campaign in 2017 opposed to Chinese involvement in the financing and construction of infrastructure in Northland. In late-2017 he stood in a by-election for the Whangarei District Council in the Denby Ward, but was unsuccessful.

In June 2018 Leitch was elected party leader and the party voted to change its name back to Social Credit. Under Leitch's leadership the party increased activities frequently putting out press releases and occasionally full-page ads in newspapers. On 8 February 2022, Social Credit released a press statement advocating for an end to the government's vaccine mandate. Leitch travelled to Wellington to attend the anti-mandate 2022 Wellington protests and spoke to protesters directly on 11 February 2022. Leitch later called for the government to compensate all people who lost their jobs due to vaccine mandate regulations.

== Personal life ==
Leitch was married to a former dance partner, Anne Wood, who travelled to the United Kingdom and studied dance techniques under ballroom A-listers. They were a couple off the dance floor at the time before going their separate ways, each marrying other people before meeting again in later life and marrying.

His father John contested Onehunga in 1960 and 1963, while his brother Tim contested North Shore in 2014, and his son Andrew contested New Lynn in 2014 and Mount Roskill in 2016 and 2017.

Leitch died of cancer on 20 January 2023, aged 70.

== Notes ==
Party political offices
Preceded by Stephnie de Ruyter	Leader of the Social Credit Party; 2018–2023	Vacant
Preceded by John Pemberton	Deputy Leader of the Democratic Party; 2013–2018	Succeeded by Amanda Vickers
Preceded by Stefan Lipa	President of the Democratic Party; 1988–1993	Succeeded by Margaret Cook
