= 1967 Palmerston North by-election =

New Zealand by-election

- 2 December 1967
- Turnout: 15,791 (76.39%)
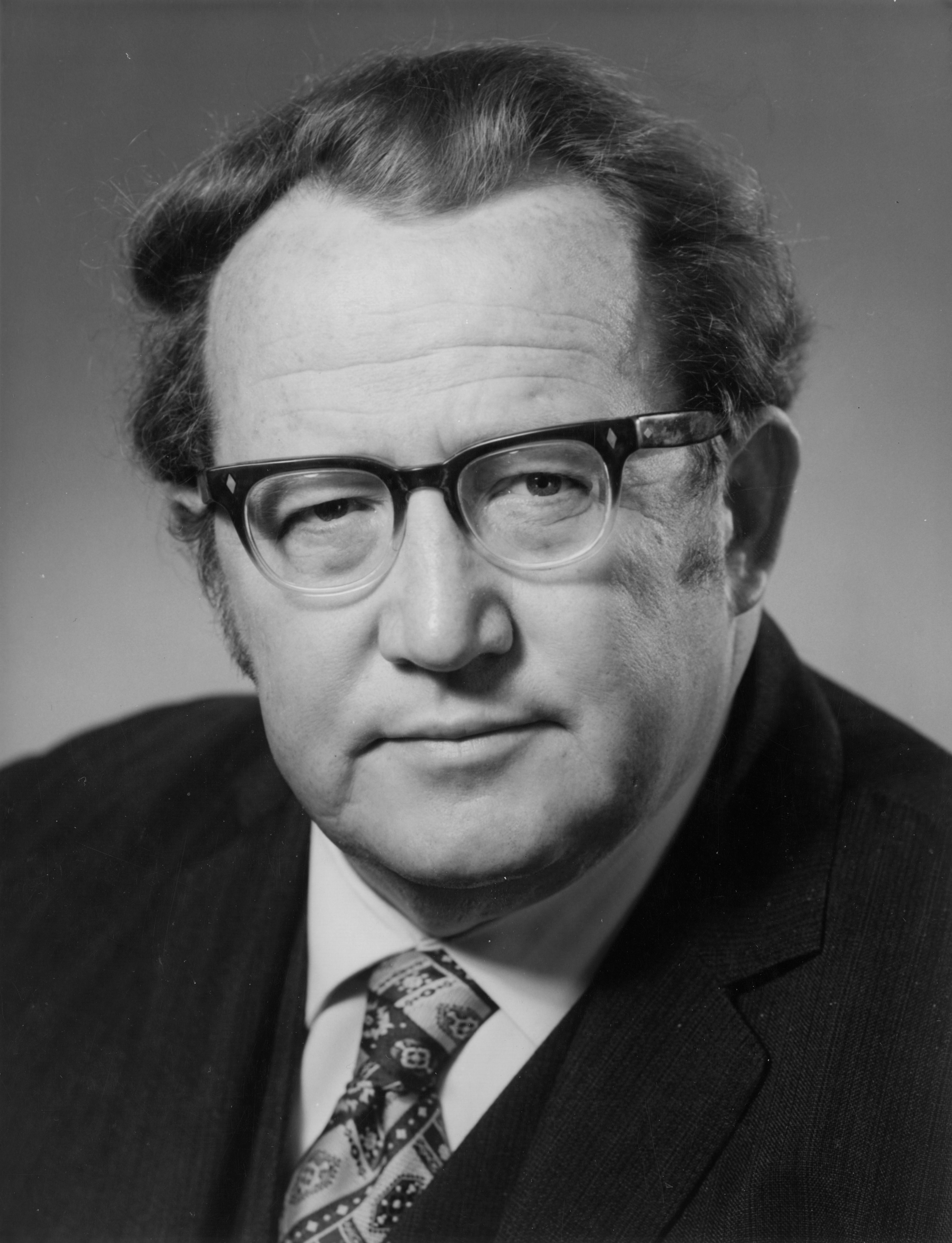

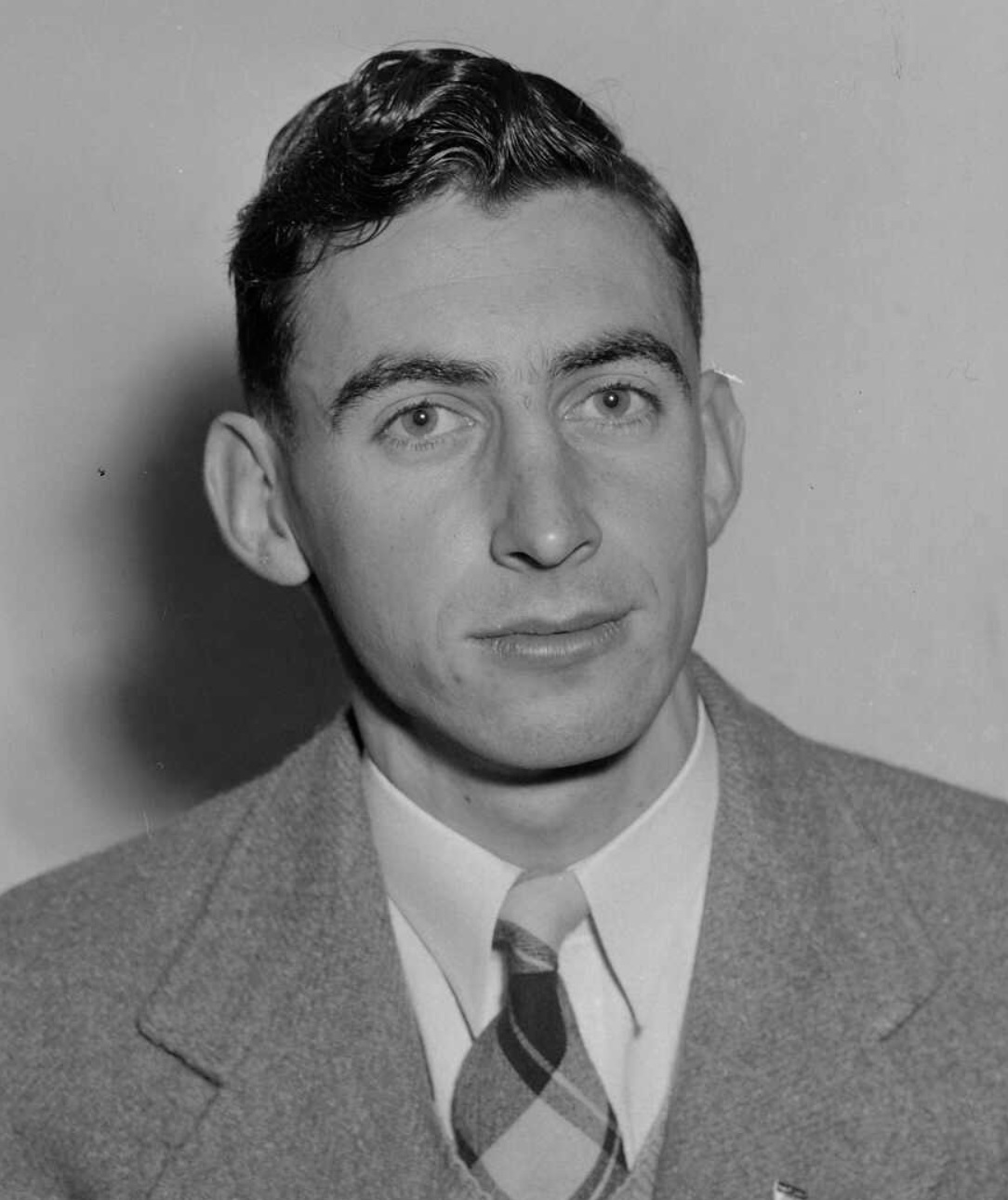

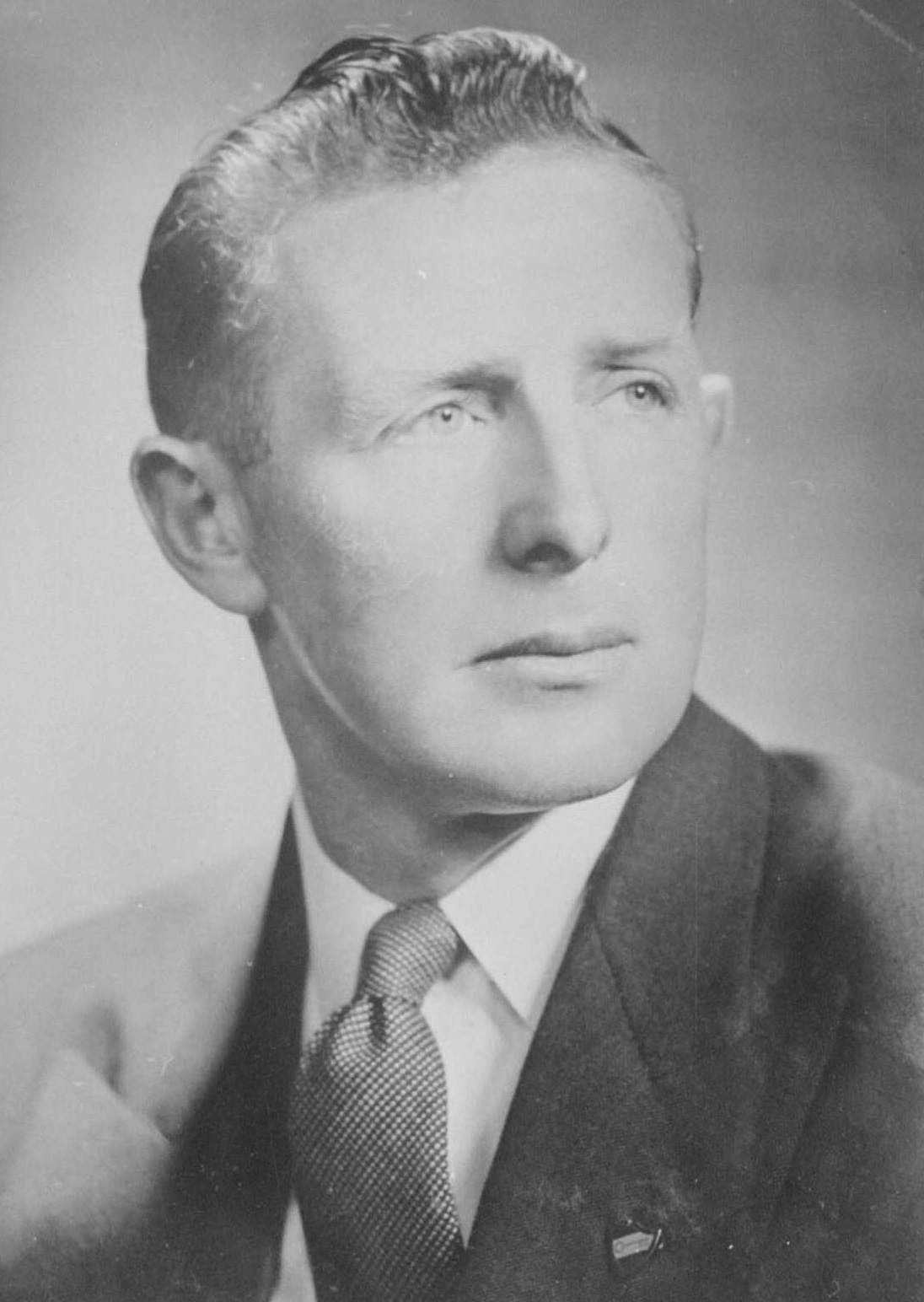
Candidate	Joe Walding	Gordon Cruden	John O'Brien
Party	Labour	National	Social Credit
Popular vote	6,939	6,347	2,410
Percentage	43.94	40.19	15.26
MP before election
Bill Brown
National
Elected MP
Joe Walding
Labour

The Palmerston North by-election of 1967 was a by-election for the electorate of Palmerston North on 2 December 1967 during the 35th New Zealand Parliament.

== Background ==
The by-election resulted from the death of the sitting member Bill Brown of the National Party on 16 October 1967. Brown had held the seat since 1960, when he won it from Philip Skoglund of the Labour Party.

== Candidates ==
Labour

The Labour Party ran Joe Walding, its candidate at the previous election, for the by-election. Walding, a food exporter and Palmerston North City Councillor since 1959, had polled well in the 1966 election where he led the count on election night, but special votes tipped to give Brown a 259-vote victory.

National

The National Party selected Palmerston North City Councillor Gordon Cruden as its candidate.

Social Credit

The Social Credit Party had four nominees to stand in the seat. Three withdrew in favour of the party's deputy leader John O'Brien. In the previous three elections he had contested the Manawatu electorate.

Others

Jamie Wedderspoon, a 22-year-old political science student at Victoria University, stood as a candidate. Wedderspoon, who was a member of the Labour Party for 6½ years, disagreed on Labour's position of opposing the Vietnam War and believed that New Zealand should keep troops in Vietnam to fight communist expansion.

The newly formed centrist Democratic Progress Party selected Mr J. Goldingham, the manager of the Palmerston North branch of a sewing machine company, as their candidate.

== Results ==
The following table contains the election results:

1967 Palmerston North by-election
Party	Candidate	Votes	%	±%
Labour	Joe Walding	6,939	43.94	−0.56
National	Gordon Cruden	6,347	40.19	
Social Credit	John O'Brien	2,410	15.26	
Democratic Labour	Jamie Wedderspoon	61	0.39	
Democratic Progress	J Q Goldingham	34	0.22	
Majority		592	3.75	
Turnout		15,791	76.39	−12.56
Registered electors		19,873		
Labour gain from National		Swing		

The by-election was won by Joe Walding of the Labour Party, and he held the seat for the next two elections, 1969 and 1972.
