= Joe Walding =

New Zealand politician

The Honourable Joe Walding
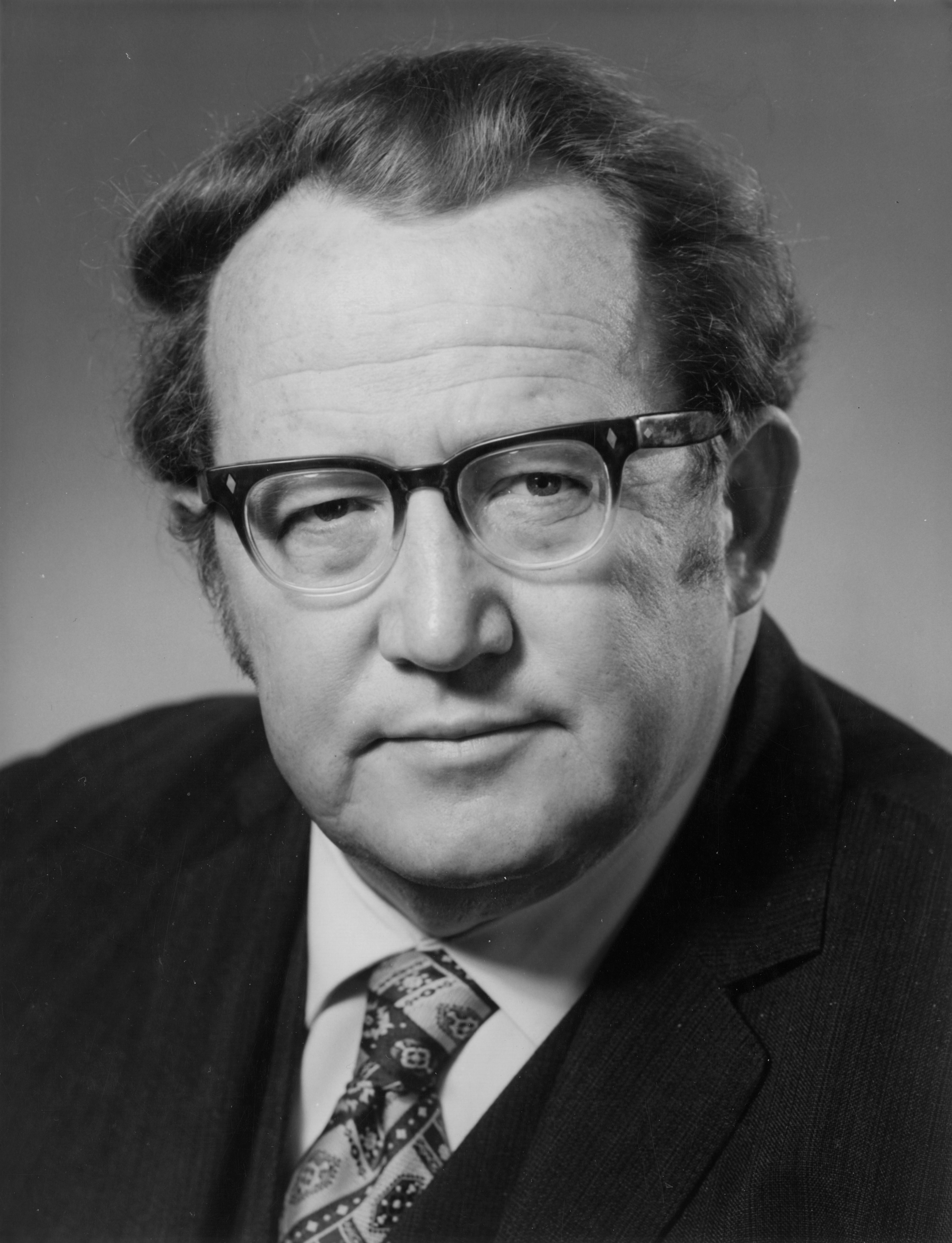

17th High Commissioner to the United Kingdom
- In office 21 February 1985 – 5 June 1985
- Prime Minister: David Lange
- Preceded by: Bill Young
- Succeeded by: Bryce Harland

3rd Minister of Overseas Trade
- In office 8 December 1972 – 12 December 1975
- Prime Minister: Norman Kirk; Bill Rowling
- Preceded by: Brian Talboys
- Succeeded by: Brian Talboys

2nd Minister of the Environment
- In office 8 December 1972 – 10 September 1974
- Prime Minister: Norman Kirk
- Preceded by: Duncan MacIntyre
- Succeeded by: Whetu Tirikatene-Sullivan

Member of the New Zealand Parliament for Palmerston North
- In office 25 November 1978 – 28 November 1981
- Preceded by: John Lithgow
- Succeeded by: Trevor de Cleene
- In office 2 December 1967 – 29 November 1975
- Preceded by: Bill Brown
- Succeeded by: John Lithgow

Personal details
- Born: 18 June 1926 Christchurch, New Zealand
- Died: 5 June 1985 (aged 58) London, England
- Party: Labour
- Spouse: Eileen Norma Paul (m. 1950)
- Children: 6

Joseph Albert Walding (18 June 1926 – 5 June 1985) was a New Zealand politician of the Labour Party. He represented the Palmerston North electorate for several terms. After his retirement from Parliament, he became High Commissioner to the United Kingdom, but died within months of taking the post.

== Biography ==
=== Early life ===
Walding was born in Christchurch, in 1926. He went to school in that city. When he was 15, he joined the New Zealand Merchant Navy and later the British Merchant Navy. The impressions that he gained through the war shaped his outlook on life. He became a carpenter after the war, working in the Wellington area.

He married Eileen Norma Walding (née Paul) of Feilding in 1950. They had six daughters. After the marriage, the couple moved to Palmerston North. Walding joined his mother's catering business, Smith and Walding. Together with his brother Charlie, he developed the company into a successful venture. In 1957, Walding established Prepared Foods Co Ltd, a gourmet food and canning business with an export focus.

=== Political career ===
New Zealand Parliament
Years	Term	Electorate	Party
1967–1969	35th	Palmerston North	Labour
1969–1972	36th	Palmerston North	Labour
1972–1975	37th	Palmerston North	Labour
1978–1981	39th	Palmerston North	Labour

Walding was first elected a member of the Palmerston North City Council in 1959; councillors were already elected for three year terms at that time. He was re-elected in 1962 and 1965. Having been elected to Parliament in 1967, he did not stand for the City Council again in 1968.

Walding stood unsuccessfully against Bill Brown for the Palmerston North seat in the 1966 election. Following Brown's sudden death in 1967, Walding successfully contested the resulting 1967 by-election against four others: Gordon Cruden (National Party), John O'Brien (Social Credit Party), Goldingham (Progress) and Jamie Wedderspoon (Democratic Labour).

Walding represented the Palmerston North electorate for the next eight years. After entering parliament he was designated as Labour's spokesperson for the environment and conservation.

During the Third Labour Government between 1972 and 1975, he was Minister of Overseas Trade, Minister for the Environment, Minister for Sport and Recreation and Associate Minister of Foreign Affairs. As Minister for the Environment he was deeply involved in the government decision in February 1973 to not raise the level of Lake Manapouri, fulfilling one of Labour's key election pledge during the Save Manapouri campaign. He then helped create an independent body, the Guardians of Lake Manapouri, Monowai, and Te Anau (composed of leading members of the protest) to oversee management of the lake levels. As Minister for Sport and Recreation he initiated the "Come Alive" campaign in 1973 which urged Kiwis to get active and participate in sport and other physical hobbies.

As Minister of Overseas Trade he made major trading market breakthroughs with both China and the Soviet Union in response to New Zealand's need to grow overseas markets after the United Kingdom cut trading ties after joining the European Common Market. At the same time he still was able to achieve favourable concessions from the United Kingdom. He solved New Zealand's problem with a beef sales quota to the United States while on a visit to Mexico. He convinced Mexico to sell its beef supply to the United States allowing New Zealand to sell more of its beef surpluses to Mexico instead of the United States. Both countries benefitting from the arrangement. In 1973 he made the first official visit by a New Zealand government minister to China since the 1949 Chinese Communist Revolution and famously rode a bicycle down the Great Wall of China. He travelled with Agriculture and Fisheries minister Colin Moyle frequently to many overseas countries, particularly Iran, Russia and China, to open more export markets for New Zealand's primary produce.

In 1975 he was defeated by John Lithgow for the Palmerston North seat. Following his defeat he was elected vice-president of the Labour Party at the 1977 party conference (after failing to win the presidency) and was re-elected at the 1978 conference. In 1978 he in turn defeated Lithgow to regain the Palmerston North seat and return the parliament. Labour was still in opposition and he was appointed Shadow Minister of Trade and Industry and later Shadow Minister of Overseas Trade. In 1979 he stood again for the Labour Party presidency but was defeated by Jim Anderton 586 votes to 527. Six months prior to the 1981 election, he announced his retirement from Parliament citing ill-health.

A group of Labour MPs (Michael Bassett, Roger Douglas, Mike Moore and Richard Prebble) organised a challenge to Anderton for the presidency at the 1982 party conference. They approached Walding to stand for party president, though he declined.

He later became a key advisor to David Lange while he was leader of the opposition and was heavily involved in Labour's successful 1984 election campaign. During the campaign he accompanied Lange on his hectic schedule of public hustings as an organiser and confidante earning him the title "Mr Lange's minder".

=== High Commissioner ===
In late 1984, he was appointed High Commissioner to the United Kingdom. In March 1985 he made a rare official visit to the Soviet Union and met with Soviet Premier Konstantin Chernenko just before Chernenko's death.

=== Death ===
Three months after starting the position, he died on 5 June 1985 in London. He collapsed following an evening dinner at his official residence in Chelsea before being rushed to St. Stephen's Hospital shortly after 10pm. He was survived by his wife and six daughters.

Walding's wife, Eileen Walding, was appointed a Companion of the Queen's Service Order for community service in the 1990 New Year Honours. She died in Havelock North on 8 June 2017.

== Notes ==
Political offices
Preceded by Brian Talboys	Minister of Overseas Trade; 1972–1975	Succeeded by Brian Talboys
New title	Minister for Sport and Recreation; 1972–1975	Succeeded by Allan Highet
Preceded by Duncan MacIntyre	Minister for the Environment; 1972–1974	Succeeded by Whetu Tirikatene-Sullivan
New Zealand Parliament
Preceded by Bill Brown	Member of Parliament for Palmerston North; 1967–1975 1978–1981	Succeeded by John Lithgow
Preceded by John Lithgow	Member of Parliament for Palmerston North; 1967–1975 1978–1981	Succeeded by Trevor de Cleene
Party political offices
Preceded by Gerald O'Brien	Vice-President of the New Zealand Labour Party; 1977–1979	Succeeded by Stu McCaffley
Diplomatic posts
Preceded by Bill Young	High Commissioner of New Zealand to the United Kingdom; 1985	Succeeded by Bryce Harland
