= John Lithgow (New Zealand politician) =

New Zealand politician

Member of the New Zealand Parliament for Palmerston North
- In office 29 November 1975–25 November 1978
- Preceded by: Joe Walding
- Succeeded by: Joe Walding

Personal details
- Born: John Lancelot Lithgow; 13 July 1933 Wanganui, New Zealand
- Died: 1 March 2004 (aged 70)
- Party: National Party, ACT
- Education: Lincoln University

John Lancelot Lithgow (13 July 1933 – 1 March 2004) was a New Zealand National Party politician. He was the member of Parliament for Palmerston North from 1975 to 1978 and, later, a member of Wanganui District Council.

== Early life and career ==
Lithgow was born in Wanganui in 1933. He grew up on his parents' dairy farm and was educated at Wanganui Collegiate School and Lincoln University. He farmed in Southland for two years before working at Imperial Chemical Industries New Zealand (ICI) as a sales representative and later as Manawatu-Wanganui field manager based in Palmerston North. His wife was Ann Lithgow, a social worker.

While working with ICI, Lithgow met with farmers who were disgruntled with the declining state of the agricultural sector which he and they attributed to the Labour Government. In response, as Lithgow told the Manawatu Evening Standard ahead of the 1975 election: "I looked at myself. I was 41, and a member of no political party. I decided that as I had no family, I could put some effort into a party and help, so I wrote out a cheque and joined the National Party."

== Member of Parliament ==
New Zealand Parliament
Years	Term	Electorate	Party
1975–1978	38th	Palmerston North	National

Lithgow helped to revive the National Party organisation in the Palmerston North electorate and was selected as its candidate for the 1975 general election. He won the election, defeating the incumbent Joe Walding by 148 votes. In the campaign, Lithgow claimed Walding had been neglectful of the electorate and spent too much time overseas (Walding held office as Minister of Overseas Trade during the 1972–1975 term).

In his opening address to Parliament in July 1976, Lithgow spoke on the housing pressures Palmerston North was facing at the time, which he attributed to the growth of Massey University. He also addressed the lack of confidence in farming, the effect this had on the wider agricultural industry, and his concern at the "great increase" to benefit payments over the previous three years and that these payments provided "no incentive" for young people to work.

Lithgow was a Robert Muldoon loyalist, describing himself as "a Rob Muldoon man" and Muldoon as "a decent guy." Lithgow supported Muldoon's agriculture, economic management and superannuation policies but voted against the Contraception, Sterilisation, and Abortion Act 1977, which Muldoon supported, and which established a legal framework for abortion in New Zealand.

At the 1978 election, Joe Walding won back the electorate for Labour. Lithgow's loyalty to Muldoon, who had become unpopular in Palmerston North by 1978, was considered a factor in voters unseating Lithgow in favour of Walding. On defeat, Lithgow promised he would continue to campaign on behalf of Palmerston North and intended to recontest the election again in 1981. However, he did not stand again for Parliament until the 1996 election, when he came sixth of seven candidates in Whanganui for ACT New Zealand, and was also placed at 39 on the ACT party list.

== Later life and death ==
Lithgow left Palmerston North for Auckland two months after the 1978 election, where he found employment. He later moved to Wanganui, where he was a member of the Wanganui Savage Club and became a Wanganui district councillor. He continued as a councillor until his death on 1 March 2004.

== Honours and awards ==
In 1977, Lithgow was awarded the Queen Elizabeth II Silver Jubilee Medal. Thirteen years later, he received the New Zealand 1990 Commemoration Medal.

New Zealand Parliament
Preceded by Joe Walding	Member of Parliament for Palmerston North; 1975–1978	Succeeded by Joe Walding
