= George Bryant =

George Bryant may refer to:

- George Bryant (actor) (1862–1943), Australian actor in the silent era
- George Bryant (archer) (1878–1938), American Olympic archer
- George Bryant (baseball) (1857–1907), American baseball player
- George E. Bryant (1832–1907), American politician and general
- George W. Bryant (1873–1947), American football coach for the Virginia Military Institute Keydets, 1895–1896
- George Bryant (New Zealand politician) (born 1938), New Zealand writer, politician and theologian
