= Ronald Algie =

New Zealand politician (1888–1978)

The Honourable Sir Ronald Algie
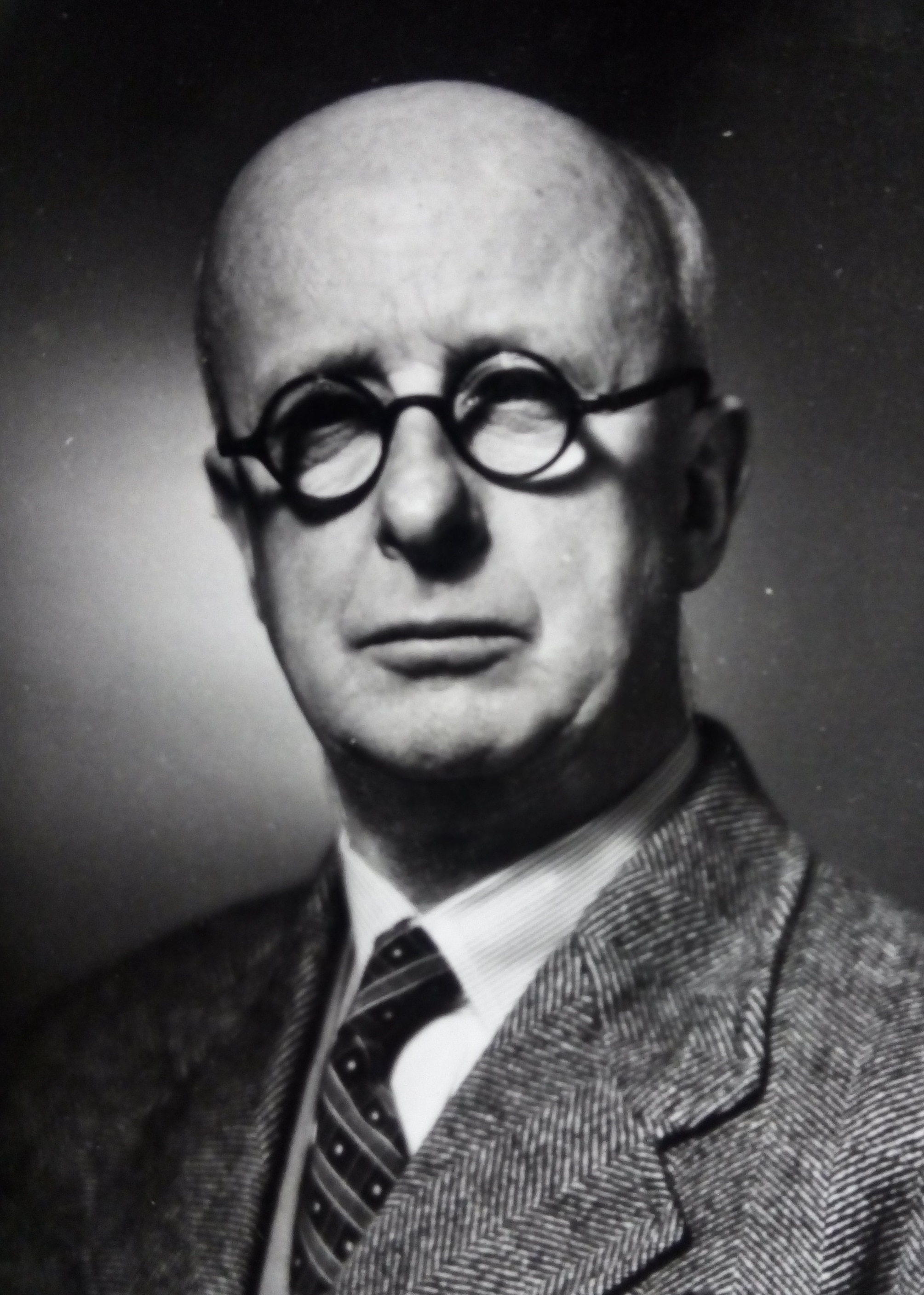

15th Speaker of the House of Representatives
- In office 20 June 1961 – 26 November 1966
- Prime Minister: Keith Holyoake
- Preceded by: Robert Macfarlane
- Succeeded by: Roy Jack

9th Minister for Science and Industrial Research
- In office 19 September 1951 – 12 December 1957
- Prime Minister: Sidney Holland; Keith Holyoake
- Preceded by: Clifton Webb
- Succeeded by: Phil Holloway

6th Minister of Broadcasting
- In office 19 September 1951 – 12 December 1957
- Prime Minister: Sidney Holland; Keith Holyoake
- Preceded by: Frederick Doidge
- Succeeded by: Ray Boord

25th Minister of Education
- In office 13 December 1949 – 12 December 1957
- Prime Minister: Sidney Holland; Keith Holyoake
- Preceded by: Terry McCombs
- Succeeded by: Philip Skoglund

Member of the New Zealand Parliament for Remuera
- In office 25 September 1943 – 26 November 1966
- Preceded by: Bill Endean
- Succeeded by: Allan Highet

Personal details
- Born: Ronald Macmillan Algie; 22 October 1888 Wyndham, New Zealand
- Died: 23 July 1978 (aged 89) Auckland, New Zealand
- Party: National
- Spouse: Helen Adair McMaster (m. 1917; died 1944)
- Profession: Professor

Sir Ronald Macmillan Algie (22 October 1888 – 23 July 1978) was a New Zealand politician who served as Speaker of the House of Representatives for six years in the 1960s. He described himself as "a Tory in the old tradition".

== Early life ==
Algie was born on 22 October 1888, in Wyndham, a small town in New Zealand's Southland Region. He was educated at Arrowtown, Thames High School and Balclutha District High School. He became a teacher at Paeroa District High School before transferring to a school in Ponsonby and later was the junior English master at Seddon Memorial Technical College. He attended Auckland University College to study law and gained an LLB in 1913 and an LLM in 1915. In 1920, aged 31, he became the first professor of law at Auckland University College. He was noted for his strong intellectual performance, and also for his conservative views.

On 4 December 1917 at St Mary's pro-Cathedral, Parnell, Algie married Helen Adair McMaster, a prominent alpinist whose climbs included an ascent of Aoraki / Mount Cook.

== Member of Parliament ==
New Zealand Parliament
Years	Term	Electorate	Party
1943–1946	27th	Remuera	National
1946–1949	28th	Remuera	National
1949–1951	29th	Remuera	National
1951–1954	30th	Remuera	National
1954–1957	31st	Remuera	National
1957–1960	32nd	Remuera	National
1960–1963	33rd	Remuera	National
1963–1966	34th	Remuera	National

In 1937, Algie became the director of the Freedom Association, an organisation that strongly opposed the left-wing Labour Party government of the time. The Freedom Association quickly became linked to the new National Party, and Algie became one of the party's more prominent supporters and was involved in the Remuera electorate. The incumbent MP for Remuera was National's Bill Endean who was unpopular among supporters, so much so that he was nearly deselected for the planned 1941 general election. The 1941 election was postponed due to the war, though, and Endean failed to get selected by the National Party for the 1943 election and Algie was chosen instead. Endean was overseas at the time of the selection, but even if he had been present, Gustafson believes that the "elderly, dull Endean would have been no match for the clever and witty Algie". Endean was the first sitting National MP who failed to get re-selected. Algie won the seat and entered Parliament.

Algie proved to be a skilled Parliamentary debater, and has been described by Hugh Templeton as the best debater of his time. Even opponents such as Bob Semple respected Algie's rhetorical abilities. He was also noted for remaining polite throughout debates, and for his willingness to apologise for any offence he accidentally gave.

=== Cabinet minister ===
After the 1949 election, when Sidney Holland formed the first National government, Algie was immediately elevated to Cabinet. He was initially appointed Minister of Education, and later became Minister of Broadcasting and Minister for Science and Industrial Research. He also co-led the committee that looked into the future of the Legislative Council, the upper house of the New Zealand Parliament, which was abolished from 1951. In the end, however, Algie's proposals for a Senate were not pursued, and New Zealand's parliament has not had an upper house since that time.

In 1953, Algie was awarded the Queen Elizabeth II Coronation Medal. Algie briefly returned to Opposition after the 1957 election, which National lost. In opposition he was appointed Shadow Minister of Foreign Affairs.

=== Speaker of the House ===
When National regained power after the 1960 election, Algie is believed to have wanted the post of Minister of External Affairs, but was not given it (possibly because of his age; he was seventy-two). Instead, he was convinced to take up the Speakership. He officially assumed office at the beginning of the 1961 parliamentary term.

As Speaker, Algie was known for his strong insistence on politeness in debates. He also undertook a number of reforms of Parliamentary procedure to accommodate the changing nature of politics. He served six years as Speaker, retiring at the 1966 election. He was generally praised for his performance in the role and in the 1964 Queen's Birthday Honours Algie was appointed a Knight Bachelor. Algie was succeeded in the Remuera seat by Allan Highet.

Algie died in Auckland on 23 July 1978.

== Notes ==
Political offices
Preceded by Robert Macfarlane	Speaker of the New Zealand House of Representatives; 1960–1966	Succeeded by Roy Jack
Preceded by Clifton Webb	Minister for Science and Industrial Research; 1951–1957	Succeeded by Phil Holloway
Preceded by Frederick Doidge	Minister of Broadcasting; 1951–1957	Succeeded by Ray Boord
Preceded by Terry McCombs	Minister of Education; 1949–1957	Succeeded by Philip Skoglund
New Zealand Parliament
Preceded by Bill Endean	Member of Parliament for Remuera; 1943–1966	Succeeded by Allan Highet
