= Doug Graham (New Zealand politician) =

New Zealand politician

The Right Honourable Sir Douglas Graham KNZM

29th Attorney-General
- In office 5 December 1997 – 10 December 1999
- Prime Minister: Jenny Shipley
- Preceded by: Paul East
- Succeeded by: Margaret Wilson

1st Minister for Treaty of Waitangi Negotiations
- In office 29 November 1993 – 10 December 1999
- Prime Minister: Jim Bolger; Jenny Shipley
- Succeeded by: Margaret Wilson

41st Minister of Justice
- In office 2 November 1990 – 1 February 1999
- Prime Minister: Jim Bolger; Jenny Shipley
- Preceded by: Bill Jeffries
- Succeeded by: Tony Ryall

Member of the New Zealand Parliament for National Party list
- In office 12 October 1996 – 27 November 1999

Member of the New Zealand Parliament for Remuera
- In office 14 July 1984 – 12 October 1996
- Preceded by: Allan Highet
- Succeeded by: Seat abolished

Personal details
- Born: Douglas Arthur Montrose Graham; 12 January 1942 (age 84) Auckland, New Zealand
- Party: National
- Relations: Kennedy Graham (brother); Robert Graham (great-grandfather)
- Profession: Lawyer

Sir Douglas Arthur Montrose Graham KNZM PC (born 12 January 1942) is a former New Zealand politician. He was an MP from 1984 to 1999, representing the National Party.

== Early life and family ==
Graham was born in Auckland, and attended Southwell School and Auckland Grammar School. In 1965 he obtained an LLB from the University of Auckland and became a lawyer, establishing his own practice in 1968. From 1973 to 1983, he lectured in legal ethics at the University of Auckland. He was chairman of the board of the Auckland Regional Orchestra from 1982 to 1983.

His great-grandfather Robert Graham was a member of the 2nd, 3rd and 4th New Zealand parliaments, from 1855 to 1868. In 2008, his brother Kennedy Graham was elected to parliament representing the Green Party. His son, Carrick, is a public relations consultant.

== Member of Parliament ==
New Zealand Parliament
Years	Term	Electorate	List	Party
1984–1987	41st	Remuera		National
1987–1990	42nd	Remuera		National
1990–1993	43rd	Remuera		National
1993–1996	44th	Remuera		National
1996–1999	45th	List	6	National

In the lead up to the 1981 election Graham unsuccessfully challenged Allan Highet for the National nomination for the suburban Auckland electorate of Remuera. Three years later Highet retired and Graham was elected to Parliament in the 1984 election as his replacement. After entering parliament National leader Sir Robert Muldoon designated Graham spokesperson for the Arts, Insurance and EQC. When Muldoon was replaced by his deputy Jim McLay Graham was appointed Shadow Minister for Disarmament and was later allocated the Revenue portfolio as well. He initially retained those roles after McLay was ousted by Jim Bolger, but substituted the Revenue portfolio for Broadcasting in September 1987 but in a major reshuffle in February 1990 he changed back from Broadcasting to Revenue and was also appointed Shadow Minister for Constitutional Issues.

=== Cabinet minister ===
When the National Party won the 1990 election, Graham was appointed to Cabinet, becoming Minister of Justice, Minister of Disarmament and Arms Control, and Minister of Cultural Affairs. In 1993, he became Minister for Treaty of Waitangi Negotiations, perhaps his most prominent role. He was widely praised by both Pākehā and Māori for his work on numerous Treaty settlements, although opponents of the process have voiced criticisms of his policies. Later, Graham also became Attorney-General and Minister for Courts. In the 1996 election, when the Remuera seat was abolished, Graham became a list MP. He was ranked sixth on National's party list, a relatively high placing.

On 21 May 1998 Graham was appointed to the Privy Council and became the Right Honourable Douglas Graham.

== Life after politics ==
He retired from politics at the 1999 election. In the 1999 New Year Honours, Graham was appointed a Knight Companion of the New Zealand Order of Merit, for services as a Minister of the Crown and Member of Parliament.

On 24 February 2012 he was convicted, along with fellow former Justice Minister Bill Jeffries and two other men, of breaching the Securities Act by making untrue statements to investors in his capacity as a director of Lombard Finance. Justice Robert Dobson wrote, "I am satisfied that the accused genuinely believed in the accuracy and adequacy of the ... documents", but that the offences were ones of strict liability so there was no need for "any form of mental intent to distribute documents that were false or misleading". Graham was sentenced to 300 hours' community service and ordered to pay $100,000 in reparation. The Court of Appeal dismissed his appeal against conviction and increased his sentence to six months' home detention and 200 hours' community work, but the Supreme Court restored the original sentence. Retired Court of Appeal judge Sir Edmund Thomas described the convictions as a "grievous miscarriage of justice", saying of the crucial piece of evidence that "you would never ever convict a dog on the basis of the schedule". There have been calls for his knighthood to be revoked, but Prime Minister John Key announced on 1 November 2013 that Graham would keep his knighthood.

== Notes ==
New Zealand Parliament
Preceded by Allan Highet	Member of Parliament for Remuera; 1984–1996	Electorate abolished
Political offices
Preceded by Bill Jeffries	Minister of Justice; 1990–1999	Succeeded by Tony Ryall
New title	Minister for Treaty of Waitangi Negotiations; 1993–1999	Succeeded by Margaret Wilson
Preceded by Paul East	Attorney-General; 1997–1999	Succeeded by Margaret Wilson
