= Allan Highet =

New Zealand politician (1913–1992)

The Honourable Allan Highet QSO
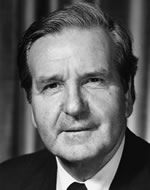

Member of the New Zealand Parliament for Remuera
- In office 26 November 1966 – 14 July 1984
- Preceded by: Ronald Algie
- Succeeded by: Douglas Graham

19th Minister of Internal Affairs
- In office 12 December 1975 – 26 July 1984
- Prime Minister: Robert Muldoon
- Preceded by: Henry May
- Succeeded by: Peter Tapsell
- In office 9 February 1972 – 8 December 1972
- Prime Minister: Jack Marshall
- Preceded by: David Seath
- Succeeded by: Henry May

1st Minister of Local Government
- In office 12 December 1975 – 26 July 1984
- Prime Minister: Robert Muldoon
- Preceded by: Henry May
- Succeeded by: Michael Bassett
- In office 9 February 1972 – 8 December 1972
- Prime Minister: Jack Marshall
- Preceded by: Position established
- Succeeded by: Henry May

6th Minister of Civil Defence
- In office 12 December 1975 – 26 July 1984
- Prime Minister: Robert Muldoon
- Preceded by: Henry May
- Succeeded by: Peter Tapsell
- In office 9 February 1972 – 8 December 1972
- Prime Minister: Jack Marshall
- Preceded by: David Seath
- Succeeded by: Tom McGuigan

2nd Minister for Sport and Recreation
- In office 12 December 1975 – 26 July 1984
- Prime Minister: Robert Muldoon
- Preceded by: Joe Walding
- Succeeded by: Mike Moore

Personal details
- Born: David Allan Highet; 27 May 1913 Dunedin, New Zealand
- Died: 28 April 1992 (aged 78) Auckland, New Zealand
- Party: National
- Spouse(s): Patricia Hoyles; Shona McFarlane
- Children: One daughter
- Relatives: Harry Highet (uncle)
- Occupation: Accountant

David Allan Highet QSO (27 May 1913 – 28 April 1992) was a New Zealand politician. He was an MP from 1966 to 1984, representing the National Party for Remuera, holding the then largest majorities in the House.

== Early life and family ==
Highet was born in Dunedin, the second son of David and Elsie Highet. He attended Otago Boys' High School. Highet's older brother, William Bremner Highet, was an Otago University scholar and professor of neurosurgery, who died when the Ceramic was sunk in 1942.

Highet attended the University of Otago, from where he graduated with a BCom.

Highet tried to enlist in the New Zealand Army in World War II, but was declined due to having suffered from tuberculosis in the 1930s. He served in the Home Guard, reaching the rank of captain.

Highet practised as an accountant and businessman, and was active in the establishment of the Wellington division of the National Party. In 1953, Highet was awarded the Queen Elizabeth II Coronation Medal.

In the 1950s, Highet was a Wellington City Councillor after winning a 1955 by-election. In 1954, Highet won the National nomination for the Wellington Central electorate. Highet's opponent, Labour candidate Frank Kitts, went on to win the seat, and later became the longest-serving Mayor of Wellington.

Highet moved to Auckland in the 1950s, becoming the senior partner in Highet and Toomey, an Auckland accounting firm. In 1960 he became general manager of L. J. Fisher and Co., Ltd and in 1962 he succeeded Hugh Watt to become executive director of the Auckland City Development Association.

Highet was first married to Patricia Hoyles.

In 1976, Highet married prominent New Zealand artist and television personality Shona McFarlane.

Highet fathered one daughter in which they formed a bond later in life and ultimately became a grandfather.

== Member of Parliament ==
New Zealand Parliament
Years	Term	Electorate	Party
1966–1969	35th	Remuera	National
1969–1972	36th	Remuera	National
1972–1975	37th	Remuera	National
1975–1978	38th	Remuera	National
1978–1981	39th	Remuera	National
1981–1984	40th	Remuera	National

Highet was elected to parliament in the 1966 elections as MP for the Auckland electorate of Remuera, succeeding retiring speaker Ronald Algie. He defeated future colleague George Gair for the nomination as National's candidate for the seat.

Highet was appointed to the Cabinet by Prime Minister Jack Marshall in 1971, becoming Minister of Internal Affairs, Minister of Local Government and associate Minister for Health and Social Welfare.

The National Party lost the 1972 elections, and Highet was in opposition until 1975. When Robert Muldoon contested the leadership of the National Party in 1974, Highet was one of two National MPs to support Marshall.

=== Cabinet Minister ===
With the National Party winning the 1975 elections, Highet was appointed to Cabinet again, becoming Minister of Internal Affairs, Minister of Local Government, New Zealand's first Minister for the Arts, and Minister for Sport.

Highet was particularly well regarded for his interest in the arts and sport, having been an opera singer and representative sportsman in his youth. Highet founded the National Youth Orchestra, and was a founding Director of the International Festival of the Arts. During his time as Minister for the Arts, Highet founded the New Zealand Film Commission, the Hillary Commission, and was actively involved in the organisation of the Historic Places Trust, the New Zealand Symphony Orchestra, the Royal New Zealand Ballet, and the Arts Council.

=== Legislation ===
In 1976, Highet introduced the Waitangi Day Act 1976, changing the name of the holiday from New Zealand Day back to Waitangi Day.

In 1977, following a petition to the House, Highet introduced God Defend New Zealand, as New Zealand's official national anthem alongside God Save the Queen.

As Minister of Internal Affairs, Highet oversaw the passage of the Citizenship Act 1977, establishing a New Zealand Citizenship as a separate citizenship, and making British citizens legal aliens for the first time. In November 1979 Highet suggested that the design of the Flag of New Zealand should be changed, and sought an artist to design a new flag with a silver fern on the fly. The proposal attracted little support however.

=== Think Big ===
In 1977, Highet introduced the expression "Think Big" in a speech to a National Party Conference, as a description of the government's then-ambitious major projects in the energy sector. Highet, as Minister of Racing, named the policy after Melbourne Cup-winning racehorse Think Big.

Highet was considered to be a social liberal, and was among a handful of economically liberal members of Muldoon's cabinet.

=== 1980 Olympic boycott ===
Highet was Sports Minister when cabinet decided to support the United States-led boycott to the 1980 Summer Olympics in Moscow. Government stepped in and threatened the New Zealand Olympic and Commonwealth Games Organising Committee (NZOCGA) with funding cuts and cancelled leave for competitors who were in the public service. Highet appealed to the athletes to "think beyond [their] own hopes and ambitions ... any athletes who did go to the Olympic Games would be letting New Zealand down".

=== 1981 Springbok Tour ===
Highet was Minister for Sport during the 1981 Springbok Tour. While Prime Minister Muldoon announced that the New Zealand Government would not intervene to stop the tour going ahead, Highet made public statements indicating that he could use his authority as Internal Affairs Minister, responsible for lotteries funding, to withdraw financial contributions to the New Zealand Rugby Union if the Tour proceeded.

== Retirement ==
Highet suffered grave illness in early 1984, one of the reasons Muldoon called a snap election. Highet retired from politics at the 1984 elections, at the age of 71. National Party member Doug Graham, who had unsuccessfully challenged Highet for the National Party nomination in 1981, won the selection, and succeeded Highet that year.

In the 1986 New Year Honours, Highet was appointed a Companion of the Queen's Service Order for public services.

New Zealand Parliament
Preceded by Ronald Algie	Member of Parliament for Remuera; 1966–1984	Succeeded by Doug Graham
