= Minister for Treaty of Waitangi Negotiations =

New Zealand minister of the Crown

- Coat of arms of New Zealand

- Flag of New Zealand

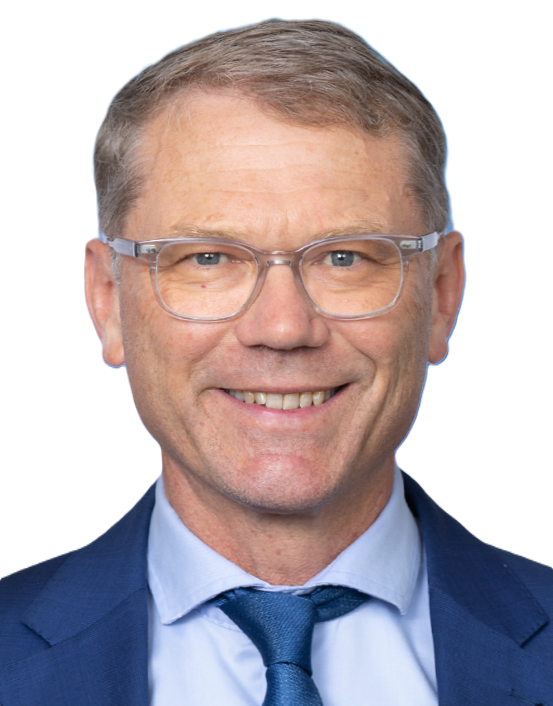
- Incumbent; Paul Goldsmith since 27 November 2023
- Ministry of Justice
- Style: The Honourable
- Member of: Executive Council
- Reports to: Prime Minister of New Zealand
- Nominator: Prime Minister of New Zealand
- Appointer: Governor-General of New Zealand
- Term length: At His Majesty's pleasure
- Formation: 1993
- First holder: Doug Graham
- Unofficial names: Treaty Negotiations Minister
- Salary: $243,841

The Minister for Treaty of Waitangi Negotiations, otherwise known as the Treaty Negotiations Minister or the Minister of Treaty Negotiations, is a minister in the New Zealand Government. The minister is tasked with multiple duties including, but not limited to, overseeing the negotiations of Treaty of Waitangi claims and settlements. The Minister falls under the jurisdiction of the Ministry of Justice.

There is no definitive answer as for when the Ministerial position was established; however, the oldest mention of the position dates to 1993, with the re-election of the Fourth National Government; who was elected on the promise of settling major Treaty claims.

== Responsibilities ==
The primary responsibility of the Minister is to ensure and maintain fair settlements between Māori and the Crown and to provide oversight over the negotiation and settlement process. The lead negotiating power within the Treaty negotiations is the Office of Treaty Settlements; however, this office reports to the Treaty Negotiations Minister, and makes its decisions based on the recommendations of the Cabinet.

Another key responsibility for the Treaty Negotiations Minister is to provide a Crown-backed apology to every claimant, once their settlement has been legislated, as a form of acknowledgement of the government alienation that led to the settlement being lodged, as well as an act of good faith with the hope of future co-operation between the two parties. In 1997, then-Minister Doug Graham said, "The goal is to restore the relationship so that all New Zealanders can face the future without looking back at the problems of the past".

=== Settlement process ===
The settlement process, as a whole, is simple. However, due to the fact that multiple iwi can lay claim to certain assets, such as land and rivers, most settlements are made public after both Claimants and Crown have agreed upon a settlement. This is done to ensure there is no overlap within claims.

There are four stages before a settlement is finalised.

- Stage 1: Pre-Negotiation - Claimants appoint representatives to represent their claims. Minister of Treaty Negotiations appoints Crown representatives.
- Stage 2: Negotiation - Claimants and Crown representatives negotiate a settlement, in the form of a Deed of Settlement and it is proposed to the Claimant group to be accepted or denied. If accepted, Stage 3 begins; however, if denied, Stage 2 is re-negotiated.
- Stage 3: Legislation - The deed is passed into legislation and becomes a legally binding settlement. Settlement also becomes a New Zealand Law.
- Stage 4: Implementation - Claimant and Crown work together to ensure all aspects of the settlement are upheld, to their best abilities.

== History ==
The precursor for the establishment of this position was the establishment of the Waitangi Tribunal in 1975, which allowed Māori to lodge claims against the Crown for breaches of the Treaty of Waitangi. The scope of claims was widened in 1985, when the Labour Government extended the Tribunals jurisdiction, and allowed Māori to claim on breaches dating back to 1840.

The next government action that was a forerunner for the establishment of the Ministerial position was the creation of the Treaty of Waitangi Policy Unit, under the Ministry of Justice, in 1988, which allowed for the Crown to bypass the Tribunal and advise policy for the negotiations of Māori claims.

The Office of Treaty Settlements was established in 1995.

=== Crown settlements ===
Since the 1975 establishment of the Tribunal, there have been more than 2000 claims lodged by multiple iwi, hapu, and whanau. Although most claims consist of small parcels of land, or financial reimbursement, there are few that are very substantial. An example of a substantial claim is the 1986 Ngai Tahu claim, that was ultimately settled in 1998 under the Ngai Tahu Claims Settlement Act, 1998, where Ngai Tahu was awarded $170 million from the Tribunal as Settlement payment for breaches against Ngai Tahu under the Treaty.

By 2010, settlements had totaled $950 million, with the majority, $671 million, being settled within just four settlements, including the aforementioned Ngai Tahu settlement. The remaining three are the Commercial Fisheries (1992) deal, valued at $170 million; the Waikato-Tainui Raupatu (1995) settlement, valued at $170 million; and the Central North Island Forestry (2008) agreement, valued at $161 million.

== List of Treaty Negotiations Ministers ==
This is a list of former, and the incumbent, Ministers responsible for Treaty of Waitangi Negotiations.

Key

Labour National

No.	Name	Portrait	Term of office		Prime Minister
1	Doug Graham		29 November 1993	10 December 1999	Bolger
1	Doug Graham		29 November 1993	10 December 1999	Shipley
2	Margaret Wilson		10 December 1999	28 February 2005	Clark
3	Mark Burton		28 February 2005	31 October 2007	Clark
4	Michael Cullen		31 October 2007	19 November 2008	Clark
5	Chris Finlayson		19 November 2008	26 October 2017	Key
5	Chris Finlayson		19 November 2008	26 October 2017	English
6	Andrew Little		26 October 2017	27 November 2023	Ardern
6	Andrew Little		26 October 2017	27 November 2023	Hipkins
7	Paul Goldsmith		27 November 2023	present	Luxon
