= Philip Skoglund =

New Zealand politician

The Honourable Philip Skoglund
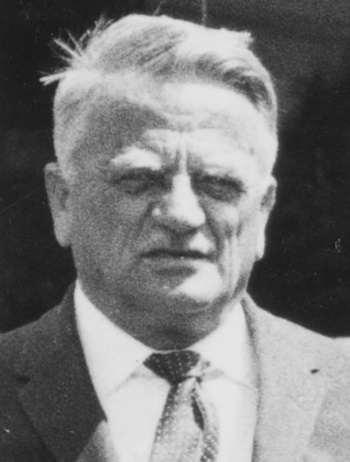

26th Minister of Education
- In office 12 December 1957 – 12 December 1960
- Prime Minister: Walter Nash
- Preceded by: Ronald Algie
- Succeeded by: Blair Tennent

Member of the New Zealand Parliament for Palmerston North
- In office 13 November 1954 – 12 December 1960
- Preceded by: Blair Tennent
- Succeeded by: Bill Brown

Personal details
- Born: Philip Oscar Selwyn Skoglund; 14 June 1899 Greymouth, New Zealand
- Died: 2 November 1975 (aged 76) Palmerston North, New Zealand
- Party: Labour
- Spouse: Olive Kathleen Smith (m. 1930)
- Relatives: Pete Skoglund (brother); Phil Skoglund (son)
- Profession: Teacher

Philip Oscar Selwyn Skoglund (14 June 1899 – 2 November 1975) was a New Zealand politician of the Labour Party who served as a cabinet minister.

== Biography ==
=== Early life and career ===
Skoglund was born in Greymouth in 1899, and educated at Stratford District High School. He then attended the University of Canterbury. He attained a law degree and then managed a Christchurch legal office. In 1923 he became a teacher at Palmerston North Boys' High School. He was also a careers adviser and in charge of the school's commercial department. In 1930 he married Olive Kathleen Smith.

=== Sporting involvement ===
When living in Stratford he became an enthusiastic lawn bowls player. After moving to Palmerston North he joined the Palmerston North Bowling Club and won the senior singles title in 1930. He then joined the Northern Palmerston North Bowling Club. For the next 20 years he was the most successful player in the Manawatu area winning the Manawatu Bowling Championship five times in 1938, 1940, 1944, 1945 and 1949. He also won 14 centre titles and reached the final four in national tournament on four occasions. In the early 1950s he was the secretary and then president of the Manawatu Bowling Centre and organised the 1952 Easter tournament. He was also a bowling correspondent for The Evening Post for several years.

His brother Pete Skoglund and son Phil Skoglund were also champion lawn bowls players.

Skoglund's sporting interests were not confined to bowls. He was vice-president of the Manawatu Rugby Union as well as a selector for the Manawatu rugby team. He was also on the Manawatu Cricket Association, vice-chairman of the New Zealand Turf Institute, and involved in the administration of Manawatu Athletics.

=== Political career ===
New Zealand Parliament
Years	Term	Electorate	Party
1954–1957	31st	Palmerston North	Labour
1957–1960	32nd	Palmerston North	Labour

He stood in the 1935 election in the Stratford electorate for the Labour Party, but was beaten by the incumbent, William Polson.

Skoglund was elected a member of the Palmerston North City Council, where he became chairman of the council's engineers' committee. Later he was deputy mayor of Palmerston North.

At the 1956 local elections he was elected to the Wellington Harbour Board as a representative for Manawatu. He did not serve his full term and resigned in 1958.

He represented the Palmerston North electorate from 1954 to 1960. Skoglund was Minister of Education, Minister for State Insurance and Minister in charge of Earthquake and War Damage Commission in the Second Labour Government from 1957 to 1960. As Minister of Education he introduced free school textbooks for secondary school pupils, raised teacher salaries and commissioned the Hughes Parry report (prepared by Professor David Hughes Parry, a former vice-chancellor of the University of London), which made recommendations for expansions in New Zealand universities. He also held a national conference on technical education which in 1960 led to the establishment of New Zealand's first ever technical institute located in Petone.

Skoglund was defeated by National's Bill Brown in 1960. Skoglund was ahead in the count election night, but lost after special votes were counted. Some, such as Walter Nash and Fintan Patrick Walsh, felt that Roman Catholic voters had turned against Labour at the election because it did not give full support to state aid for private schools although others such as Nash's biographer, Keith Sinclair, doubt whether it was a significant factor.

After his exit from parliament, Skoglund became a secretary to Walter Nash in 1961 while the latter was Leader of the Opposition. He was also a contender for the Labour nomination at the 1962 Buller by-election. He was defeated again in 1963, attempting to regain the Palmerston North seat.

=== Later life and death ===
He was a guest of honour at the first meeting of caucus following Labour's victory in the 1972 election and oversaw the election of the cabinet.

Skoglund died on 2 November 1975, aged 76, survived by his wife and children.

== Notes ==
New Zealand Parliament
Preceded by Blair Tennent	Member of Parliament for Palmerston North; 1954–1960	Succeeded by Bill Brown
Political offices
Preceded by Ronald Algie	Minister of Education; 1957–1960	Succeeded by Blair Tennent
