= Kennedy Graham =

New Zealand politician

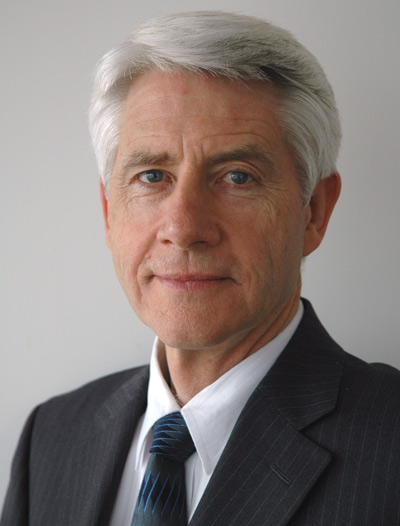
- Graham in 2008

Member of the New Zealand Parliament for Green Party List
- In office 2008–2017

Personal details
- Born: Kennedy Gollan Montrose Graham; 1946 (age 79–80)
- Party: Green Party (until 2017)
- Relations: Doug Graham (brother); Robert Graham (great-grandfather)
- Children: Two
- Education: University of Auckland; The Fletcher School of Law and Diplomacy; Victoria University of Wellington

Kennedy Gollan Montrose Graham (born 1946) is a New Zealand politician, academic and diplomat.

Following a career in diplomacy and international relations with the New Zealand Foreign Service and the United Nations, Graham was elected a Member of the New Zealand House of Representatives for the Green Party in 2008. He retired from Parliament in 2017.

He is the brother of Sir Douglas Graham, a former National Party MP (1984–1999) and cabinet minister (1990–1999). He is also a great-grandson of Robert Graham, an MP from 1855 to 1868.

== Education ==
Graham has a Bachelor of Commerce (BCom) from the University of Auckland, a Masters of Arts (MA) in International Relations from The Fletcher School of Law and Diplomacy at Tufts University in Medford, Massachusetts, and a PhD from Victoria University of Wellington. Graham's PhD thesis, completed in 1983, was titled Nuclear Weapon-Free Zones as an Arms Control Measure.

He received Fulbright and Fletcher scholarships (1972), a McCarthy Fellowship (1986) and a Quatercentenary Fellowship at Emmanuel College, Cambridge University (1995).

== Career ==
As a New Zealand diplomat, Graham was involved in the negotiation of the South Pacific Nuclear Free Zone in the mid-1980s, and represented New Zealand's nuclear-free policy in the Conference on Disarmament in Geneva in the late 1980s. He worked as secretary-general of Parliamentarians for Global Action in New York (1989–1994), where he developed the concept of the "planetary interest" for promotion in parliaments around the world.

From 1996 to 1998, Graham worked in Stockholm at the International Institute for Democracy and Electoral Assistance, holding the position of director of planning and coordination. Graham was also a United Nations official working as a director at the UN University Leadership Academy in Amman, Jordan (1999–2002) and as a senior consultant in the Department of Political Affairs (2005–2006). He was also a visiting professor at the College of Europe in Bruges, Belgium, teaching International Relations at MA level.

In 2007, after returning to New Zealand, he became adjunct senior fellow at the University of Canterbury School of Law, and was a senior lecturer at the Victoria University of Wellington Institute of Governance and Policy Studies.

Graham founded the New Zealand Center for Global Studies in 2013.

== Member of Parliament ==
New Zealand Parliament
Years	Term	Electorate	List	Party
2008–2011	49th	List	9	Green
2011–2014	50th	List	5	Green
2014–2017	51st	List	7	Green

=== First term: 2008–2011 ===
After standing in the Ilam electorate during the 2008 election, Graham was elected as a list MP after counting of the special votes. In his maiden speech, Graham noted that: "We are drawing down on Earth's natural resources, borrowing forward on the human heritage, irretrievably encroaching on our children's right to inherit the Earth in a natural and sustainable state."

In his first term, Graham was a member of the justice and electoral committee and was the Green Party musterer (whip), spokesperson for justice and international climate change, and associate spokesperson for foreign affairs and sustainability.

In July 2009 Graham's International Non-Aggression and Lawful Use of Force Bill was drawn from the member's ballot. The bill would have outlawed the crime of aggression in New Zealand domestic law, with imprisonment for any New Zealand leader involved, and also required the government to table a legal opinion in Parliament before committing any forces to overseas military operations. The bill was voted down at its first reading, 64 to 58.

=== Second term: 2011–2014 ===
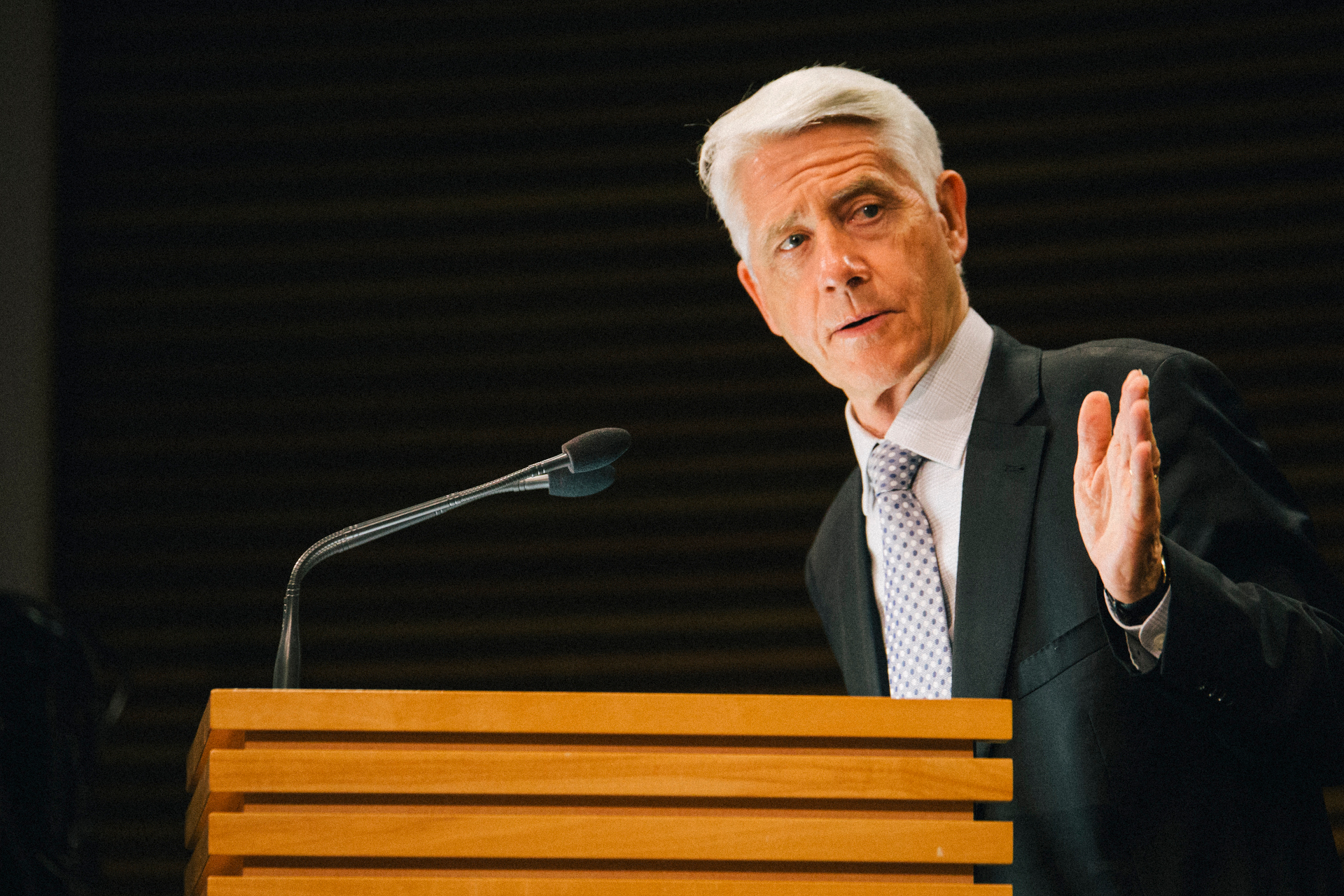
Graham at the Cross-party Climate Change Vivid Report launch in Parliament in March 2017

In 2011, Graham stood again in Ilam and was re-elected as a list MP. He held the Green Party portfolios of climate change, constitutional issues, defence, global affairs and disarmament, and was deputy chair of the foreign affairs, defence and trade committee.

In June 2013, Graham organised a public one-day climate change conference which was held at the old Legislative Council chamber at Parliament. The conference explored the state of climate science, the link between international action and domestic responsibility, the roles of civil society and businesses, available policy mechanisms, and ended with a political panel of MPs discussing climate change.

=== Third term: 2014–2017 ===
At the 2014 general election, Graham was listed at number 7 on the Green party list. He contested the Helensville electorate and was re-elected as a list MP. He continued as the party's spokesperson on foreign affairs and was additionally spokesperson for senior citizens (until 2016) and veterans' affairs and served a second term as a member of the foreign affairs, defence and trade committee.

In October 2015, Graham formed a cross-party group, GLOBE-NZ, working on climate change. GLOBE-NZ is a national chapter of GLOBE-International, and has 35 MPs as members drawn from all seven political parties represented in the 51st Parliament. As chairman of the national chapter, Graham contracted a London-based consultancy, Vivid Economics, to prepare a report on "transformational pathways to carbon neutrality for New Zealand". The report, Net Zero in New Zealand: Scenarios to achieve domestic emission reduction the second half of the century, was launched in the New Zealand Parliament in March 2017. The initiative is regarded as a major step forward in clarifying inter-party discourse and debate on New Zealand's national climate change policy.

In 2016, a private member's bill originally drafted by Graham was introduced by Green co-leader James Shaw. The Public Finance (Sustainable Development Indicators) Amendment Bill proposed that governments report on ecological as well as economical measures, but failed at its first reading in a 48 to 73 vote.

Ahead of the 2017 general election, on 7 August, Graham unexpectedly announced his resignation as a Green Party candidate. Green co-leader Metiria Turei, during and following a pre-election social policy announcement, had revealed she had previously committed benefit and electoral fraud. David Clendon, the party whip, also announced his resignation. Graham and Clendon stated that their resignations were due to the public positions Turei had taken regarding her offending, and her subsequent refusal to step down from her leadership role. They resigned from the party caucus on 8 August, following moves to have them removed. Turei resigned as party co-leader and as a list candidate on 9 August. Graham sought to be returned to the party list (where he had been ranked at 8); the party executive declined his appeal on 12 August.

Graham gave his valedictory speech in Parliament on 16 August. He said he was leaving without "hard feelings", and said that: "If politics transgresses conscience, politics must cede.” Graham noted he was proud of the cross-party group on climate change he formed at Parliament (GLOBE-NZ), which produced a plan for New Zealand to reach zero net carbon emissions by 2050. Graham's work on climate change policy was acknowledged by members of the following parliament with the passage of the Climate Change Response (Zero Carbon) Amendment Act 2019.

== Publications ==
- Graham, Kennedy (2008). Models of Regional Governance: Sovereignty and the future architecture of regionalism. Canterbury University Press.
- Graham, Kennedy (2006). "Regional Security and Global Governance: A study of interaction between regional agencies and the UN Security Council". Brussels: UN University/VUB Institute for European Studies.
- Graham, Kennedy (1999). The Planetary Interest: An Emerging Concept for the Global Age. New Jersey: UCL Press, London & Rutgers.
- Graham, Kennedy (1989). National Security Concepts of States: New Zealand. New York: Taylor & Francis for UNIDIR.

Peer reviewed books, book chapters, books edited

- Graham, Kennedy (2015). 'Global Citizenship & Global Constitutionalism" for publication by Martinus Nijhoff / Brill in 2015.
- Graham, Kennedy (editor) (2008). Models of Regional Governance: Sovereignty and the Architecture of Pacific Regionalism, Christchurch: University of Canterbury Press.
- Graham, Kennedy and Tania Felicio (2006). Regional Security and Global Governance: A Study of Interaction between Regional Agencies and the UN Security Council; With a Proposal for a Regional-Global Security Mechanism, Brussels: VUB University Press.
- Graham, Kennedy (editor) (1999). The Planetary Interest, New Brunswick: Rutgers University Press.
- Graham, Kennedy (1989). National Security Concepts of States: New Zealand, New York: Taylor & Francis, Inc.
