= Democratic Progress Party (New Zealand) =

- Abbreviation: DPP
- Chairperson: Robert David Welch
- Founder: Harry Hughes
- Founded: 1966
- Political position: Centrist

The Democratic Progress Party was a centrist political party that was formed to stand electoral candidates in the mid-1960s.

== History ==
The Democratic Party was founded in mid-1966 in Wellington, promoted by Harry Hughes, a baker from Tawa. According to Hughes, most of the people who became involved had previously been involved with the National or Labour parties but became dissatisfied with how they carried out their policies. The party was guided in its policy by the United Nations Charter in which the role of government was protecting and maintaining the natural democratic way of life of the individual. More specific policies were:

- Encouraging overseas borrowing, while controlling overseas investment
- Supporting military involvement in the Vietnam War
- Holding a referendum on drinking hours
- Increasing pensions and social security benefits to match the cost of living
- Opposing state aid to private schools
- Decreasing immigration for labour

Formed only months before the 1966 general election the party struggled to attract candidates and only contested four seats; Franklin, Heretaunga, Island Bay and Wellington Central. Hughes stood in the Wellington Central electorate, polling last of four candidates with only 1.2% of the votes.

In May 1967, the Progress Party was formed in Napier and merged with the Democratic Party a week later. The new combined party became known as the Democratic Progress Party, self-describing as a "middle of the road" group hoping to contest at least 20 seats at the 1969 general election.

The combined party contested the 1967 Palmerston North by-election, but its candidate came last and won only 0.2% of the votes.
