= John O'Brien (New Zealand politician) =

New Zealand politician

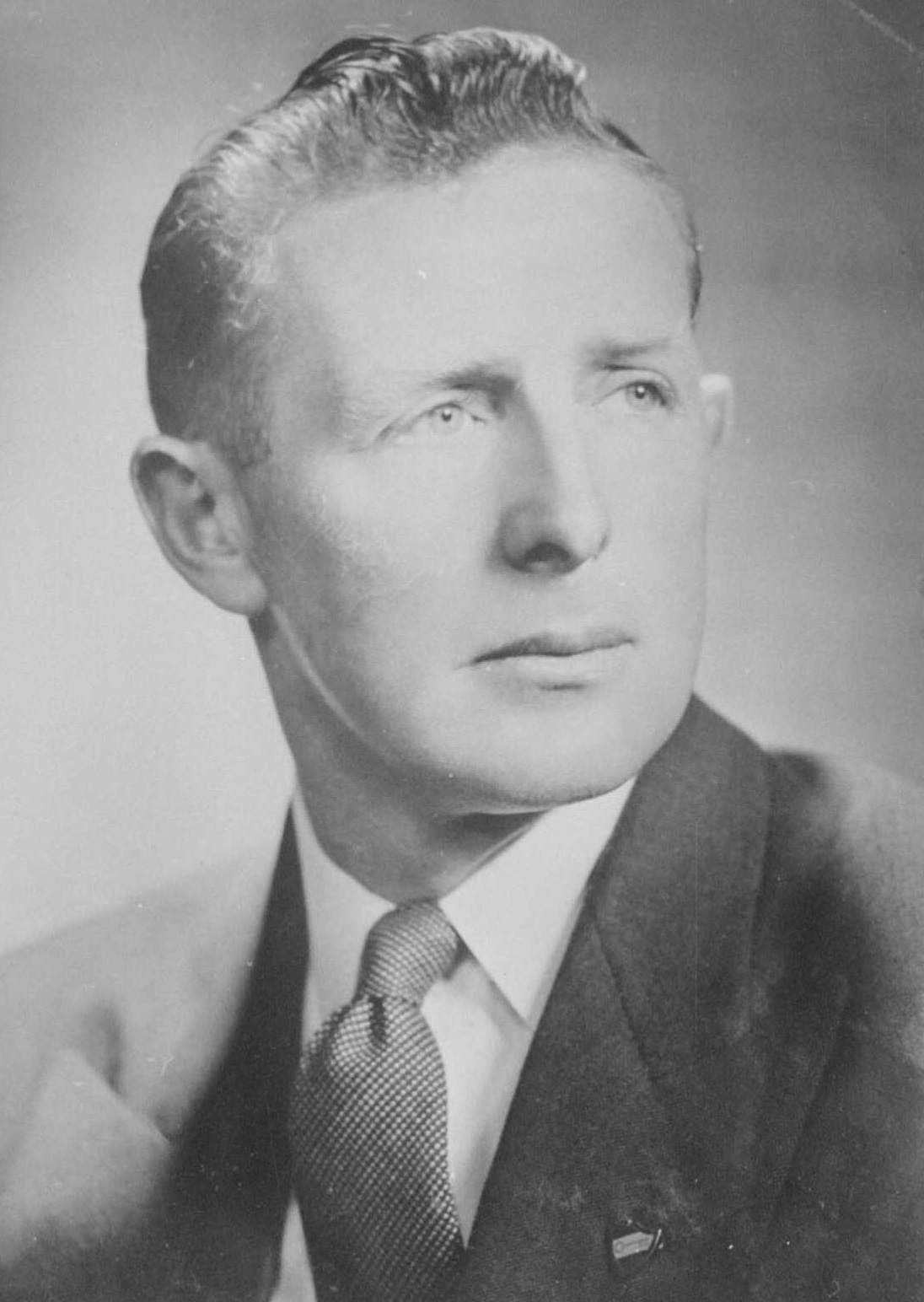

4th Leader of the Social Credit Party
- In office 24 May 1970 – 14 May 1972
- Deputy: Tom Weal
- Preceded by: Vernon Cracknell
- Succeeded by: Bruce Beetham

Personal details
- Born: John Bernard O'Brien; 31 July 1925 Palmerston North, New Zealand
- Died: 12 October 1990 (aged 65) Nelson, New Zealand
- Party: Social Credit

John Bernard O'Brien (31 July 1925 – 12 October 1990) was a political candidate and party leader of Social Credit in New Zealand.

== Biography ==
O'Brien was the Social Credit Party candidate for the Manawatu electorate in the 1957 and 1960 general election placing third. Following the sudden death of Bill Brown, O'Brien unsuccessfully contested the Palmerston North electorate in the 1967 by-election.

In the 1960s, O'Brien was deputy-leader to first P. H. Matthews and then Vernon Cracknell, who was the sole Social Credit MP. Cracknell lost his seat in the 1969 election, and the following year, O'Brien challenged him for the leadership. The contest was bitter, even resulting in brawling between supporters of the two camps. Eventually, O'Brien was successful. Cracknell removed his name from the leadership ballot after his candidate for party president was defeated by another candidate backed by O'Brien. After Cracknell's declination, O'Brien defeated Patrick McMullan of Dunedin for the leadership by 139 votes to 51.

Although a powerful speaker and an energetic organiser, O'Brien was accused by his opponents of being abrasive and overly confrontational. He quickly antagonised many party members, particularly those in the Christchurch branch. O'Brien's leadership of the party lasted only until 1972, when, with Tom Weal, the deputy leader, and others, he quit the party and was replaced by Bruce Beetham.

O'Brien then formed his own group, the New Democratic Party. The New Democrats were one of the larger parties to contest the 1972 election, standing candidates in all but one electorate. In the end, they placed fifth overall, winning merely 0.66% of the vote. They did not win any seats. O'Brien himself stood in the Nelson electorate placing last of five candidates with only 2.97% of the vote. He later sued the Social Credit Party for defamation regarding a statement of claim against him in an article published in The Nelson Mail in 1972. A four and a half day trial was held at the Nelson courthouse where the jury found against O'Brien's $50,000 case, determining that the words in the article in question were not published to readers with authority from the party and nor did the paper infer that it was.

He was from the Palmerston North area. After politics, he ran a shop in Nelson then retired and later died there, aged 65.

== Notes ==
Party political offices
Preceded by Vernon Cracknell	Leader of the Social Credit Party; 1970–1972	Succeeded by Bruce Beetham
Vacant	Deputy Leader of the Social Credit Party; 1960–1970	Succeeded by Tom Weal
