= George Bryant (New Zealand politician) =

New Zealand author and politician

George Bryant QSM JP
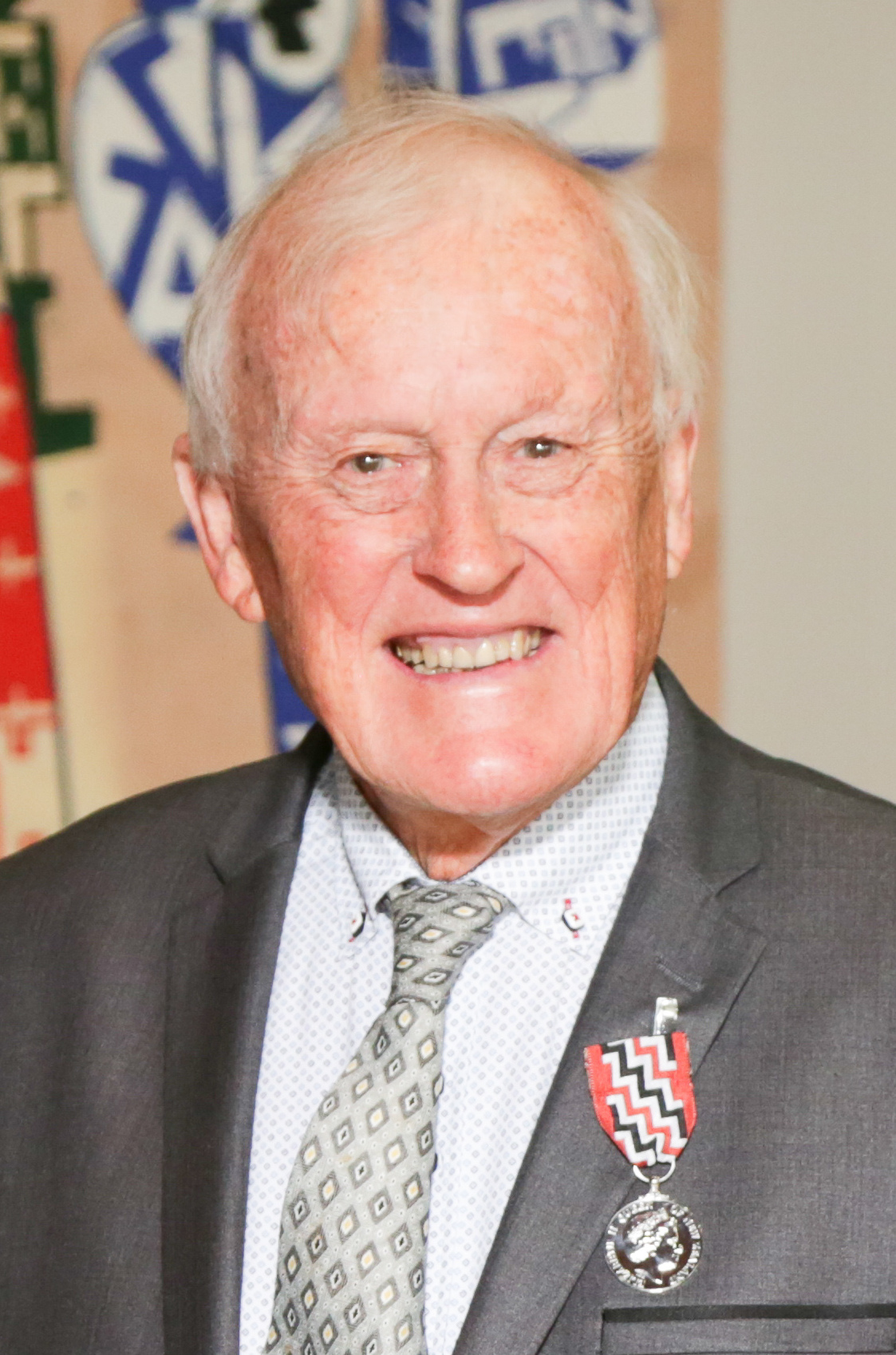
- Bryant in 2019

10th President of the Social Credit Party
- In office 22 May 1976 – 25 August 1979
- Leader: Bruce Beetham
- Preceded by: Don Bethune
- Succeeded by: Stefan Lipa

Personal details
- Born: 29 September 1938 (age 87) Ashburton, New Zealand
- Party: Social Credit
- Spouse: Joan Birtles (m. 1966)
- Children: 2
- Profession: Teacher

George William Bryant QSM JP (born 29 September 1938) is a New Zealand writer, politician and theologian. He was a councillor for Whangarei District Council for six years during the 1980s and twice stood in parliamentary elections for Social Credit.

== Biography ==
=== Early life and career ===
Bryant was born in Ashburton, on 29 September 1938, and raised in the town. He attended Ashburton Borough School and spent five years at Ashburton High School before attending Canterbury University (graduated BA in 1961), Christchurch Teachers' College (diploma in teaching 1961), and Victoria University of Wellington (graduated MA in 1964).

He started his career as a teacher and after various appointments gained the deputy principal's position at Papakura High School (1978–1979) followed by the principalship of Whangarei Girls' High School in 1980, a position he held for fifteen years.

=== Writing ===
Bryant is a writer on New Zealand's people and society. He has written 24 non-fiction books, 20 booklets, edited 50 volumes and written many articles for various magazines and newspapers. His focus has been on politics, religion, education, biographies of leading Kiwis, the environment, world aid, and stories of overcomers and social issues, such as the widening gap between the rich and poor. Bryant's latest work is Life Is... in which he examines the meaning of life, what life on earth is really like, who we are, what we are doing here and what the future holds. In 2010 Bryant, and editor Julie Belding established a not-for-profit publishing company, Day Star Books Ltd. To date they have published nearly 50 books which are aimed to "inspire and give hope". Bryant now spends most of his time holding seminars for Christian writers, mentoring, editing and publishing. He is a member of NZ Society of Authors and an honorary member of NZ Christian Writers.

=== Political career ===
Bryant was a member of the Social Credit Party and was party spokesman for education in the 1970s. He became president of the party from 1976 to 1979. He was the youngest president in the history of the party. He was a party publicist, largely setting the scene for leader Bruce Beetham and two others to enter parliament, and wrote all of Social Credit's election manifestos from 1972 to 1987. He stood for election twice for Social Credit. At the 1969 election he stood in the Piako electorate where he finished second. At the 1975 election he stood in the Rodney electorate where he finished third.

Bryant served six years on the Whangarei City Council (1983–1989) as chairman of its Town Planning Committee.

=== Community service ===
He is a justice of the peace. He is an active local member of Rotary International. Bryant has held leadership roles with Rotary, World Vision and Birthright New Zealand. He was Northland World Vision representative for 15 years, served on the World Vision trust board for four years and was vice-president of New Zealand Birthright (1986–1990) and Whangarei chairman. He was President Northland Mental Health Association, President of the Whangarei Council of Social Services and Chairman Bay of Plenty Symphonia from 2015 to 2016.

In the 2019 New Year Honours he was awarded the Queen's Service Medal for his work in pioneer publishing and the community.

=== Religious activities ===
In 1995 he moved into Christian ministry and was appointed chaplain at Wesley College in Pukekohe and studied theology part-time at St John's Theological College being ordained into Methodist ministry. In 1999 Bryant and his wife Joan pastored the Welcome Bay Community Church in Tauranga and since 2006 he has been assistant minister at the Bethlehem Community Church and St Enoch's, both under Presbyterian auspices. From 1999 to 2004, he was minister at Welcome Bay Community Church and as of 2018 was honorary assistant pastor at St Enoch's Presbyterian Church, Tauranga.

=== Personal life ===
Bryant married Joan Birtles in 1966. They have two adult children.

== Notes ==
Party political offices
Preceded by Don Bethune	President of the Social Credit Party; 1976–1979	Succeeded by Stefan Lipa
