= New Democratic Party (New Zealand) =

- Founder: John O'Brien
- Founded: 14 May 1972
- Dissolved: c. 1976
- Split from: Social Credit Party
- Ideology: Social credit
- Political position: Centre-right

The New Democratic Party of New Zealand was a small political party established in 1972. It was a splinter group from the better-known Social Credit Party.

== History ==
It was founded by former Social Credit leader John O'Brien. O'Brien was considered a powerful and energetic orator, but had a controversial and aggressive leadership style, and alienated many of his followers. After being replaced as leader by Bruce Beetham, O'Brien quit the Social Credit Party with his deputy Tom Weal and established his own group. The party's Dominion chairman was Patrick McMullan of Dunedin who, ironically, had stood against O'Brien for the Social Credit leadership in 1970. In the 1972 election, the New Democrats fielded eighty-six candidates (including Wilfrid Owen), but did not win any seats. The New Democrats won 0.63% of the vote, compared with 6.65% for Social Credit. O'Brien himself stood in the Nelson electorate placing last of five candidates with only 2.97% of the vote.

The party was still in existence in 1975 and was considering standing candidates at the 1975 election. However the party did not end up standing any candidates.

O'Brien later sued the Social Credit Party in 1980 for defamation regarding a statement of claim against him in an article published in The Nelson Mail in 1972. A four and a half day trial was held at the Nelson courthouse where the jury found against O'Brien's $50,000 case, determining that the words in the article in question were not published to readers with authority from the party and nor did the paper infer that it was.
