= Stephnie de Ruyter =

New Zealand politician

Stephnie de Ruyter is a former leader of the New Zealand Democratic Party, a small centre-left New Zealand political party based upon Social Credit economics. The Democrats, who, in June 2018, returned to campaigning under the name Social Credit are currently outside Parliament.

While the Democratic Party was a member of the Alliance, de Ruyter served as an Alliance candidate. In the 1999 election, she was the Alliance's candidate for the Invercargill electorate, and was ranked twenty-second on the party's list. She was not elected. Later, when the Democrats joined Jim Anderton to establish the breakaway Progressive Coalition, de Ruyter took an active role in building the new party. By the time of the 2002 election, de Ruyter was deputy leader of the Democrats and was ranked fifth on the Progressive list. She also stood as the Progressive Coalition's candidate in Invercargill. Once again, she was not elected.

Not long after the 2002 election, the Democrats opted to leave the Progressive Coalition and reestablish themselves as an independent party. The leader of the Democrats, Grant Gillon, along with the former leader John Wright, unsuccessfully urged the party to remain a member of the Progressive Coalition. De Ruyter was elected leader on Gillon standing down and John Wright also leaving.

De Ruyter has also been involved in local-body politics in Invercargill, standing for election to the Southland health board.
