= Palmerston North Bowling Club =

Palmerston North Bowling Club is the oldest bowling club in Manawatu, established in 1889. It is unique in being the only freehold club in Palmerston North and one of a few in New Zealand. It has the largest membership of bowlers in Palmerston North.

== History ==
The Palmerston North Bowling Club was formed at a meeting held in the Commercial Hotel on 23 December 1889 with nine persons in attendance. A special committee was set up in November 1899 to investigate the purchase of a property in Taonui Street and to rent a strip of land on the North Side of the club in Lombard Street in order to allow for more playing area.

On 18 October 1958 the Linton Street complex comprising the new club rooms and two greens was opened by His Worship the Mayor Blair Tennant. As a member Phil Skoglund represented New Zealand at the 1970 Commonwealth Games. In 1989, the club celebrated its 100th year, by hosting a Centennial Tournament. The club annually holds a four player tournament attracting entries from all over New Zealand.

=== Colours ===
The original club colours, decided upon at a meeting held 29 February 1892, were Grey and White striped coat and White hat with Grey band. These colours were re-affirmed at the Annual General Meeting 1900. The colours were changed by the General Committee in 1911, but there is no reference to the alteration. At a special meeting on 30 September 1914 the colours became Navy Blue with Gold facings. Any other changes are not recorded until mention of the present colours of Dark Blue and Gold coming into effect on 12 October 1946.

=== Women’s Section ===
The formation of this followed the holding of a Special General Meeting in September 1975 by the Palmerston North Bowling Club, when the admittance of a Women’s Section was approved.

=== NZ team selection ===
World Bowls 1966 Phil Skoglund

South Africa 1968 Phil Skoglund

Commonwealth Games 1970 Phil Skoglund

Newcastle Pairs 1983 K. A. Wing

Embassy World Bowls 1988 A. J. Seator

=== Achievements ===
In 2008 Palmerston North Bowling Club won the Bowls New Zealand Lion Foundation Men’s National Interclub Championship. That year they also won Manawatu Sportsteam of the year.
