= Bill Brown (New Zealand politician) =

New Zealand politician

William Henry Brown (18 June 1899 – 16 October 1967) was a New Zealand politician of the National Party.

== Biography ==
=== Early life ===
Brown was born in Napier in 1899, the son of Henry Stafford Brown and his wife Ellen Susannah Brown (née Day).

=== Political career ===
New Zealand Parliament
Years	Term	Electorate	Party
1960–1963	33rd	Palmerston North	National
1963–1966	34th	Palmerston North	National
1966–1967	35th	Palmerston North	National

He was a member of the Palmerston North City Council from 1931 to 1935. In 1953, he was awarded the Queen Elizabeth II Coronation Medal.

Brown first contested the Palmerston North electorate at the 1957 election against the incumbent, Philip Skoglund of the Labour Party. That year, Skoglund was confirmed by the voters. However, in the 1960 election, Brown beat Skoglund by the narrow majority of 123 votes. The election night results had Skoglund in the lead, narrowly, but special votes overturned the initial result in Brown's favour. At the 1963 election, Brown had a 772-vote majority to Skoglund. The 1966 election was contested by Brown against Labour's Joe Walding, with Brown holding a 259-vote majority. Brown died in office in 1967. He was succeeded by Walding through a by-election later in 1967.

=== Death ===
Brown died on 16 October 1967 in Kaiapoi while speaking at a function after the opening a section of the Christchurch Northern Motorway.

New Zealand Parliament
Preceded by Philip Skoglund	Member of Parliament for Palmerston North; 1960–1967	Succeeded by Joe Walding
