= Tom Weal =

New Zealand politician

Thomas Kavanagh Weal (7 March 1929 – 29 October 2016) was a New Zealand politician for the Social Credit Political League, the New Democratic Party and the short lived Christian Democrat party.

== Political career ==
Weal served as deputy leader of the Social Credit Political League from 1970 until 1972. He worked as a teacher at St Peter's College in Auckland where one of his students, Stefan Lipa was influenced by him in social credit theory and later became the Social Credit Party President between 1979 and 1987. Another of his students was John Tamihere later a Member of Parliament (1999–2005) (for the Labour Party) and a cabinet Minister (2002–2004). Tamihere was considerably influenced by Weal.

Weal stood as a Social Credit candidate in numerous elections (usually in the electorate of Mt Albert), as well as in by-elections in Fendalton and Hutt in 1967 and 1968, respectively. He was notably misquoted with regards to comments on unemployment during the 1968 Hutt by-election.

Weal quit the Social Credit Political League with John O'Brien in 1972 and joined the New Democratic Party. That party unsuccessfully contested the 1972 election. Weal was later involved with the short lived Christian Democrat party in the 1980s.

== Campaign against UK joining EEC ==
Weal was sent by Social Credit leader John O'Brien to the United Kingdom in 1971 in an effort to stop that country from joining the European Economic Community (EEC), which Social Crediters in New Zealand were deeply concerned about.

In Britain, Weal stated that the British public was not aware of the damage that New Zealand would suffer if Britain joined the Common Market without safeguards for her primary produce. He spent three weeks talking to anti-market groups in England. He promoted a special arrangement for New Zealand if Britain entered the EEC. Weal said he had found that very few people knew exactly what joining the EEC meant for Britain. He thought that that was why there was a great fear of going into Europe at the time. He said: "The public just doesn't know what's going on in Brussels. For this reason they're interested in hearing the Commonwealth view on the negotiations and that's what I've tried to express." Weal was invited to return to Britain and was urged to bring a member of the New Zealand Labour Party with him. "We wouldn't be here to play politics, but just to let people know what's in it for us if Britain joins the EEC", he said. He rejected the idea that he was "meddling" in British politics. "In fact one of the most successful things I did was to deliver a letter outlining New Zealand's objections to British membership to every MP before the Common Market debate", he said. Weal thought that letter had an influence in the fact that more than 100 Labour members signed a petition opposing the entry negotiations.

== Death ==
Weal died on 29 October 2016 in Auckland and was buried at Hautapu Cemetery, Cambridge. Weal's death occurred just four months after the Brexit referendum (23 June 2016) where the United Kingdom voted to leave the European Community, the successor of the EEC.
