= Minister of Trade (New Zealand) =

New Zealand minister of the Crown

- Te Manatū Aorere (Māori)
- Coat of arms of New Zealand

- Flag of New Zealand

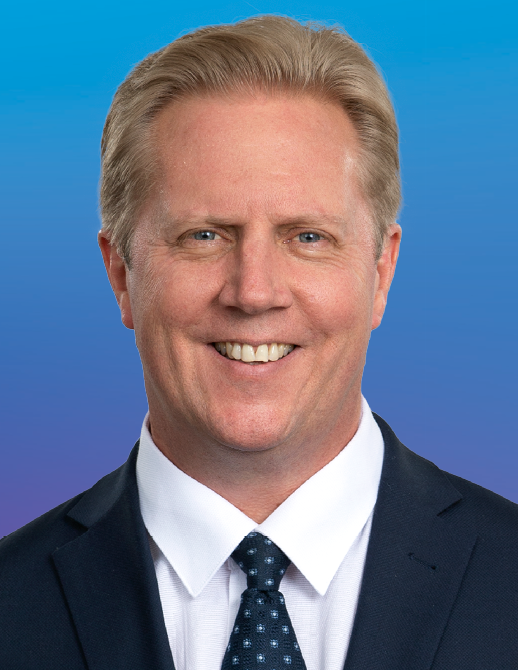
- Incumbent; Todd McClay since 27 November 2023
- Ministry of Foreign Affairs and Trade
- Style: The Honourable
- Member of: Cabinet of New Zealand; Executive Council
- Reports to: Prime Minister of New Zealand
- Appointer: Governor-General of New Zealand
- Term length: At His Majesty's pleasure
- Formation: 1960
- First holder: Jack Marshall (as Minister of Overseas Trade)
- Salary: $288,900
- Website: www.beehive.govt.nz

The Minister of Trade (Māori: Manatū Aorere is a minister in the New Zealand Government appointed by the Prime Minister. The current Minister of Trade is Todd McClay.

== List of ministers ==
The following ministers have held the office of Minister of Trade.

Key

National Labour

No.	Name	Portrait	Term of Office		Prime Minister
1	Jack Marshall		12 December 1960	9 February 1972	Holyoake
2	Brian Talboys		9 February 1972	7 November 1972	Marshall
3	Joe Walding		8 December 1972	12 December 1975	Kirk
3	Joe Walding		8 December 1972	12 December 1975	Rowling
(2)	Brian Talboys		12 December 1975	11 December 1981	Muldoon
4	Warren Cooper		11 December 1981	26 July 1984	Muldoon
5	Mike Moore		26 July 1984	2 November 1990	Lange
5	Mike Moore		26 July 1984	2 November 1990	Palmer
5	Mike Moore		26 July 1984	2 November 1990	Moore
6	Don McKinnon		2 November 1990	16 December 1996	Bolger
7	Lockwood Smith		16 December 1996	10 December 1999	Bolger
7	Lockwood Smith		16 December 1996	10 December 1999	Shipley
8	Jim Sutton		10 December 1999	19 October 2005	Clark
9	Phil Goff		19 October 2005	19 November 2008	Clark
10	Tim Groser		19 November 2008	14 December 2015	Key
11	Todd McClay		14 December 2015	26 October 2017	Key
11	Todd McClay		14 December 2015	26 October 2017	English
12	David Parker		26 October 2017	6 November 2020	Ardern
13	Damien O'Connor		6 November 2020	27 November 2023	Ardern
13	Damien O'Connor		6 November 2020	27 November 2023	Hipkins
(11)	Todd McClay		27 November 2023	Incumbent	Luxon
