= Stefan Lipa =

New Zealand politician

Stefan Lipa (born 1953) (LL.B (Auck) 1975) is a former New Zealand politician. He was president of the Social Credit Party (originally the Social Credit Political League; in 1985 its name was changed to the Democratic Party) from 1979 to 1987 and he was a leading advocate of proportional representation in New Zealand.

== Early life ==
Lipa spent his childhood in Auckland and was educated at St Peter's College where one of the influential teachers was Tom Weal, deputy leader of the Social Credit Political League 1970–1972. Lipa studied law at the University of Auckland and practised law in Auckland.

== Political career ==
Lipa was elected as a dominion councillor of the party in the 1970s. With Bruce Beetham, the leader of the party, he wrote a major submission on electoral reform to the Parliamentary Select Committee on Electoral Reform. The submission proposed, among other things, the introduction of proportional representation into the political system of New Zealand to replace the then current first past the post electoral system. On 23 August 1979, at the party's annual conference, he was, at the age of 26, elected as president of the party, a position he held until 1987. In the New Zealand general election of 1981, the party gained the greatest share of votes in its history, 20.65%. But the party only won two seats, giving poignant nuance to the work Lipa had done on electoral reform. From 1985 the Social Credit name was dropped, and the party became the New Zealand Democratic Party with Lipa continuing as president until 1987. In 1996, New Zealand obtained a proportional representation system when the first past the post system was replaced by the Mixed-Member Proportional Representation electoral system.
