= Social Credit Party (New Zealand) =

New Zealand political party

- Founded: 10 January 1953; 73 years ago
- Dissolved: 28 February 2023; 3 years ago
- Preceded by: Real Democracy Movement
- Headquarters: 42 Reyburn House Lane, Whangārei, 0110
- Ideology: Social credit
- Political position: Centre to centre-left
- Slogan: Here for Good

Website
- socialcredit.nz

The New Zealand Social Credit Party (sometimes called "Socred") was a political party that was New Zealand's third party from the 1950s to the 1980s. It won representation in the New Zealand House of Representatives, holding one seat at times between 1966 and 1981, and two seats from 1981 to 1987. While Social Credit once had significant support, particularly as a protest vote, it was disadvantaged by first-past-the-post voting as it had no geographically concentrated vote. Its most identifiable leaders were Vernon Cracknell (1963–1970), who served just one term in parliament, and Bruce Beetham, who rebuilt the party into a significant political force. At its height under Beetham in 1981, Social Credit achieved 20.7% of the vote.

The party held no seats in its own right after 1987 and subsequently declined. It was named the New Zealand Democratic Party from 1985 to 2018, and was part of the Alliance from 1991 to 2002. The party returned to the Social Credit name in 2018. The Social Credit Party and its logo were deregistered at the party's request on 28 February 2023, following the death of its leader Chris Leitch earlier that year.

The party was based on the ideas of social credit, an economic theory established by C. H. Douglas. Social credit movements also existed in Australia (Douglas Credit Party and Australian League of Rights), Canada (Social Credit Party of Canada), and the United Kingdom (UK Social Credit Party) although the relationship between those movements and the New Zealand movement was not always amicable. The party was also intermittently damaged from allegations of antisemitism, stemming from Douglas' racist views. Beetham formally denounced antisemitism upon his election.

== History ==
=== The Social Credit Association ===
The Social Credit Political League was formed in 1953 out of the membership of the Social Credit Association, an educational organisation. The association focused much of its efforts on the Country Party and New Zealand Labour Party, where it attempted to influence economic policy.

The social credit movement decided to set up a "separate political organisation" the Real Democracy Movement in 1942. RDM got about 4,400 votes in the 1943 election. Roly Marks had stood as a monetary reform candidate on behalf of the Real Democracy Movement in the Wanganui electorate in 1943, and was later made a life member of the League.

Maurice Hayes stood for the Waimate electorate on behalf of the Social Credit Association in the 1951 election, receiving 374 votes and coming third.

Social Credit claimed that the first Labour government, which was elected at the 1935 election, pulled New Zealand out of the Great Depression by adopting certain Social Credit policies. Several followers of Social Credit policies eventually left the Labour Party, where their proposals (for example, those of John A. Lee for housing) were strongly opposed by the "orthodox" Minister of Finance, Walter Nash and other prominent Labour Party members.

In 1940 Lee, who had by then been expelled from the Labour Party, and Bill Barnard formed the Democratic Labour Party. The new party got 4.3% of the vote in the 1943 general election, with both Lee and Barnard losing their seats.

=== Foundation ===
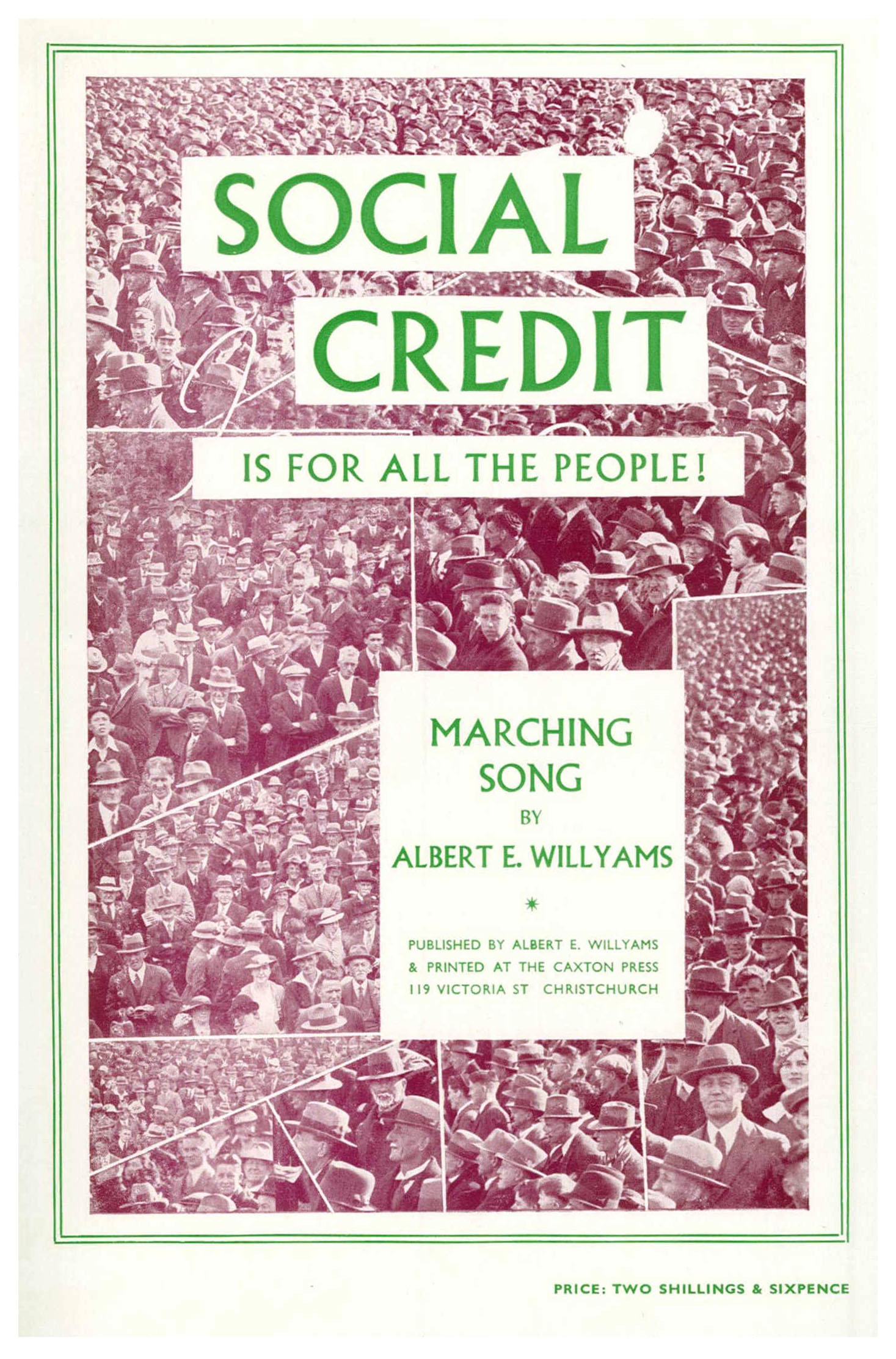
Social Credit marching song from the 1950s

The Social Credit Party was established as the Social Credit Political League. It was founded on 10 January 1953, and grew out of the earlier Social Credit Association.

The party's first leader was Wilfrid Owen, a businessman. Much of the early activity in the party involved formulating policy and promoting social credit theories to the public.

=== Early history (1953–1972) ===
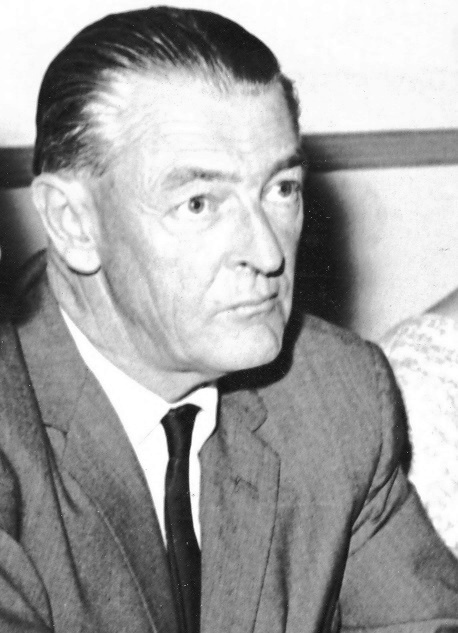
Vernon Cracknell, leader 1963–70, MP for Hobson 1966–69

Social Credit gained support quickly, and in the 1954 elections, the party won 11.13% of the vote. The party failed to win seats in parliament under the first past the post electoral system. The party's quick rise did, however, prompt discussion of the party's policies. National saw Social Credit as a threat in the 1957 election and established a caucus committee to challenge their theories. Gustafson comments that the successes in some seats (Hobson, Rangitikei, East Coast Bays and Pakuranga) came from a "peculiar and infrequent combination of factors", with votes in those seats coming from "a handful of committed monetary reformers plus alienated National voters and the tactical voting of Labour supporters in a seat where Labour could not win".

In 1960 P. H. Matthews replaced Owen as leader, before being replaced three years later by Vernon Cracknell, an accountant. It was not until the 1966 election, however, that the party won its first representation in parliament. Cracknell managed to win the Hobson electorate in Northland in 1966, a region that had been a stronghold of the Country Party. Cracknell narrowly defeated the National Party's Logan Sloane, the incumbent, after having placed second in the previous two elections.

Cracknell did not prove to be a good performer in parliament itself, however, and did not succeed in advancing the Social Credit manifesto. Partly due to this, and partly due to an exceptionally poor campaign, Cracknell was not re-elected in the 1969 election, returning Sloane to parliament and depriving Social Credit of its only seat.

The following year, a leadership contest between Cracknell and another prominent Social Credit member, John O'Brien, ended in disaster, with brawling between supporters of each candidate. The damage done to the party's image was considerable. O'Brien was eventually victorious, but his blunt and confrontational style caused him to lose his position after only a short time in office. He split from Social Credit to found his own New Democratic Party.

=== Popularity zenith (1972–1985) ===
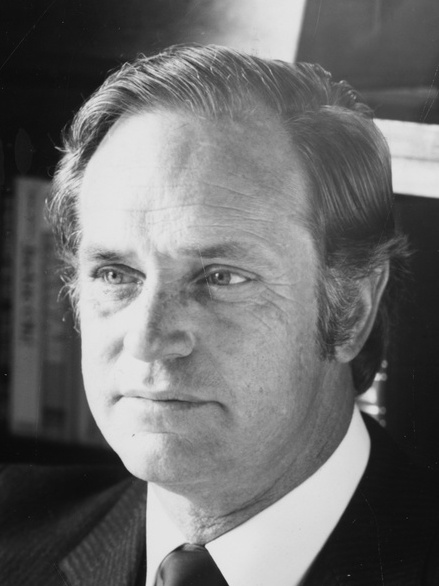
Bruce Beetham, leader 1972–85, MP for Rangitikei 1978–84

O'Brien's replacement was Bruce Beetham, who would become the most well known Social Credit leader. Beetham took over in time for the 1972 election. Despite a relatively strong showing, Social Credit failed to win any seats, a fact that some blamed on the rise of the new Values Party. While the Values Party did not win any seats, many supporters of Social Credit believed that it drew voters away from the older party.

In the 1978 by-election in Rangitikei, caused by the death of National Party MP Roy Jack, Beetham managed to defeat National's replacement candidate and win the seat. Beetham was more successful in parliament than Cracknell had been, and gained Social Credit considerable attention. He also put forward a New Zealand Credit and Currency Bill, intended to implement many Social Credit policies. The Bill was criticised by some of the more extreme Social Credit supporters, who claimed that it was too weak, but was nevertheless strongly promoted in parliament by Beetham. The Bill quickly failed, although this was not particularly unexpected – it had been put forward primarily for the purpose of drawing attention, not because Beetham believed it would succeed.

Beetham retained his seat in the 1978 general election. He was later joined by Gary Knapp, who defeated free-market National Party candidate Don Brash in the 1980 by-election in East Coast Bays (caused by the resignation of the sitting National MP). Knapp, like Beetham, was highly active in parliament.

Led by Beetham and Knapp, Social Credit became a popular alternative to the two major parties. Political scientists debate how much of this was due to Social Credit policies and how much was merely a "protest vote" against the established parties, but one poll recorded Social Credit with as much as 30% of the vote.

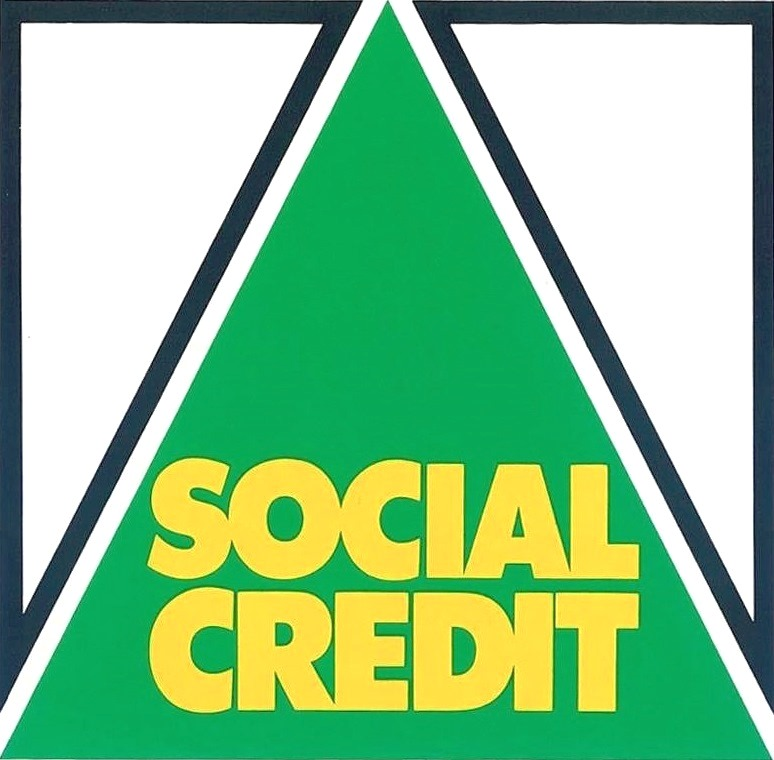
1980s party logo

By the 1981 election, the party's support had subsided somewhat, and Social Credit gained 20.55% of the vote. As expected, the electoral system did not translate this into seats in parliament, but Social Credit did retain the two seats it already held. A year later, it officially dropped "Political League" from its official name, becoming merely the Social Credit Party.

During that parliamentary term, Social Credit's support was damaged by a deal between Beetham and National Party Prime Minister Robert Muldoon. In exchange for Social Credit support for the Clyde Dam, a controversial construction project and part of Think Big, Muldoon undertook to back certain Social Credit proposals. This did considerable harm to Social Credit's popularity, as Muldoon's government (and the project itself) were opposed by most Social Credit members. To make matters worse, Muldoon did not deliver on many of his pledges, depriving Social Credit of any significant victories with which to mitigate its earlier setback.

In 1983, Beetham suffered a minor heart attack, causing him to lose some of his earlier energy. He also became, according to many Social Credit supporters, more demanding and intolerant. This reduced Social Credit's appeal to voters.

In the 1984 election, Beetham lost his Rangitikei seat to a National Party challenger, Denis Marshall. Knapp retained his East Coast Bays seat, and another Social Credit candidate, Neil Morrison, won Pakuranga. Despite still holding the same number of seats, Social Credit won 7.6% of the total vote in 1984, a substantial drop. Some commentators attributed this to the New Zealand Party, an economically right-wing liberal party that opposed Muldoon's government. The New Zealand Party may have taken some of the protest votes that Social Credit once received. It was from this election that the term "Crimplene Suit and Skoda Brigade" was coined for Social Credit (by defeated National Party Pakuranga MP Pat Hunt).

=== Democrats (1985–1991) ===
1980s Democrats party logo

At the party's 1985 conference, the Social Credit name was dropped, and group became the New Zealand Democratic Party (Beetham had earlier argued for a simpler name in 1982). At the 1987 election, the party held two seats in parliament (one was East Coast Bays, held by Garry Knapp; and the other was Pakuranga, held by Neil Morrison). The Democratic Party lost both those seats, removing them from parliament. In 1988, Knapp and a group of other Democrats were involved in a protest at parliament to highlight the Labour government's abandonment on its election promise to hold a referendum on the first-past-the-post electoral system.

The Social Credit name did not vanish immediately, however. In 1986, the year after the party was renamed, Bruce Beetham was removed from the leadership of the Democrats and replaced by Neil Morrison. The Democrats saw their vote slump in 1987 and both its MPs were defeated. By 1990 the party's vote collapsed altogether by which time they had been eclipsed by other third party choices such as the Greens and NewLabour. It is believed that changing the name of the party was a historic mistake and a major cause in the subsequent decline of support.

Beetham was extremely bitter about the Democrats' change of direction, and led a short-lived splinter group called Social Credit-NZ, using the Social Credit label. It failed to win any seats in 1990 and quickly vanished.

=== Alliance years (1991–2002) ===
The Democrats, finding themselves increasingly pressured by the growth of NewLabour (founded by rebel Labour Party MP Jim Anderton) and the Greens, decided to increase cooperation with compatible parties. This resulted in the Democrats joining NewLabour, the Greens and Māori-based party Mana Motuhake in forming the Alliance, a broad left-wing coalition group.

In the 1996 election, which was conducted under the new mixed-member proportional representation electoral system, the Alliance won thirteen seats. Among the MPs elected were John Wright and Grant Gillon, both members of the Democratic Party. However, there was considerable dissatisfaction in the Democratic Party over the Alliance's course. Many Democrats believed that their views were not being incorporated into Alliance party policy, particularly as regards the core economic doctrine of social credit. The Alliance tended towards orthodox taxation based left-wing economics and was not prepared to implement the Democratic Party's somewhat unusual economic theories.

By the 1999 election, the Democrats were one of two remaining component parties in the Alliance as the Greens had left the grouping and the Liberals and NewLabour components dissolved, their members becoming members of the Alliance as a whole rather than of any specific constituent party.

=== Progressive Coalition and independent again (2002–present) ===
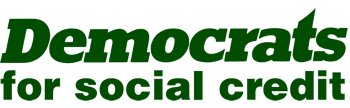
2000s party logo

In 2002, when tensions between the "moderate left" and the "hard left" caused a split in the Alliance, the Democrats followed Jim Anderton's moderate faction and became a part of the Progressive Coalition. In the 2002 election, Grant Gillon and John Wright were placed third and fourth on the party's list. However, the Progressives won only enough votes for two seats, thus leaving the two Democrats outside parliament.

Shortly after the election, the Democrats split from the Progressives, re-establishing themselves as an independent party. However, Gillon and Wright, both of whom opposed the split, chose not to follow the Democrats, instead remaining with the Progressives. The Progressive Coalition became the Progressive Party after the Democrats left. The Democrats chose Stephnie de Ruyter, who had been fifth on the Progressive list, as their new leader.

In 2005, the party re-added "for Social Credit" to its name to supplement its party name. The Democrats contested that year's general election as an independent party and received 0.05% of the party vote. In the 2008 general election, the party again won 0.05% of the party vote.

The party did not apply for broadcasting funding for the 2011 election. During the election, it won 1,432 votes and was the only party to not attract a party vote in an electorate (Mangere). The party fielded thirty electorate candidates and four list only candidates in the 2014 general election but continued to fail to gain any seats in the 51st New Zealand Parliament.

During the 2017 general election, the Democrats for Social Credit ran 26 candidates, namely 13 electorate candidates and 13 list only candidates. The party gained 806 votes on the party vote (0.0%) and failed to win any seats in Parliament.

In June 2018, the party voted to change its name back to Social Credit after Chris Leitch was elected leader.

During the 2020 general election, Social Credit won no seats, obtaining 1,520 votes (0.05%). In 2021 the party opposed COVID-19 vaccine mandates.

The party's registration was cancelled at its own request on 28 February 2023. Leitch died in January 2023 which left "a really big hole" in the party organisation according to party president Gloria Bruni. The party requested deregistration due to membership having dipped below 500 but will still remain active despite being deregistered and being unable to submit a party list at the 2023 general election. Bruni stated that the party intends to rebrand to avoid comparison with the controversial social credit system used by the Chinese Communist Party.

== Accusations of antisemitism (1934–1984) ==
During the 20th century, the social credit movement in New Zealand was accused of indulging in antisemitic conspiracy theories. C. H. Douglas, the founder of the social credit movement, toured New Zealand in 1934 and expounded his view that Jews were involved in a global conspiracy to control finance. His ideas were discussed in the New Zealand Social Credit publication Plain Talk. Social Credit, along with the Department of Internal Affairs, published From Europe to New Zealand: An Account of Our Continental European Settlers by Eric Butler and R.A Lochore, which repeated Jewish financial conspiracy claims. In the 1980 East Coast Bays by-election, the Labour Party attempted to discredit Social Credit with a pamphlet that set out Major Douglas's antisemitic views.

The encyclopedia Te Ara states that the antisemitism of Social Credit ended in the 1970s with the election of leader Bruce Beetham who was more liberal. In the late 1970s the party became concerned about infiltration by the antisemitic League of Rights and ejected members with racist views. Professor Paul Spooney stated that antisemitic sentiment was "largely irrelevant" by the 1970s, but remained present until 1984 when Beetham ejected party members who believed in an international financial Jewish conspiracy.

== Electoral results ==
Election	Seats			Votes	
Election		Of total			Of total
1951	0	0%	0 / 80	374	0.03%
1954	0	0%	0 / 80	122,068	11.13%
1957	0	0%	0 / 80	83,498	7.21%
1960	0	0%	0 / 80	100,905	8.62%
1963	0	0%	0 / 80	95,176	7.94%
1966	1	1.3%	1 / 80	174,515	14.48%
1969	0	0%	0 / 84	121,576	9.07%
1972	0	0%	0 / 87	93,231	6.65%
1975	0	0%	0 / 87	119,147	7.43%
1978	1	1.1%	1 / 92	274,756	16.07%
1981	2	2.17%	2 / 92	372,056	20.65%
1984	2	2.11%	2 / 95	147,162	7.63%
1987	0	0%	0 / 97	105,091	5.74%
1990	0	0%	0 / 97	30,455	1.67%
1993–1999	Part of the Alliance				
2002	Part of the Progressive Coalition				
2005	0	0%	0 / 121	1,079	0.05%
2008	0	0%	0 / 122	1,208	0.05%
2011	0	0%	0 / 121	1,432	0.07%
2014	0	0%	0 / 121	1,730	0.07%
2017	0	0%	0 / 120	806	0.03%
2020	0	0%	0 / 120	1,520	0.05%

== Office holders ==
=== Presidents ===
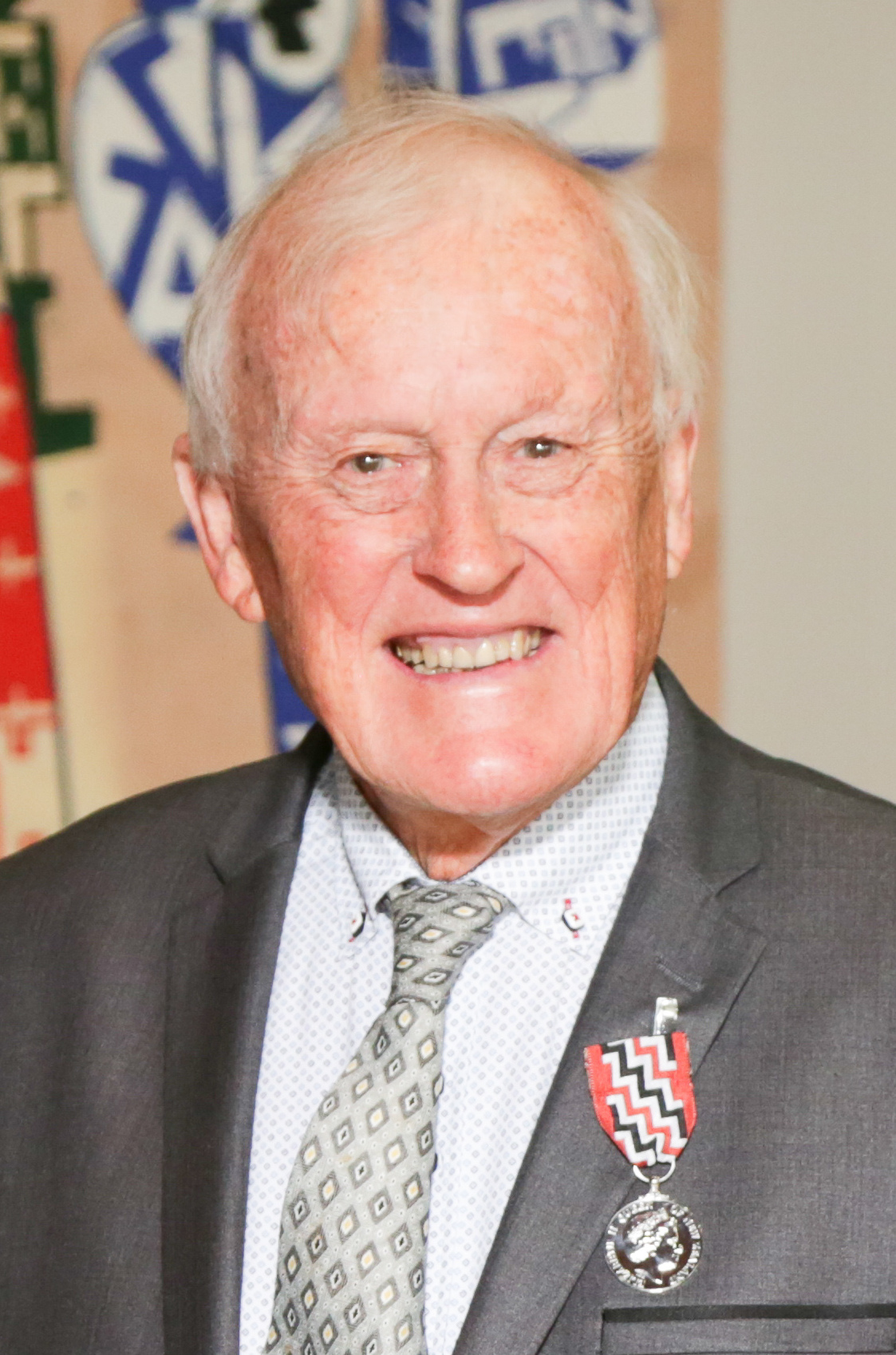
Bryant in 2019

President	Term
Septimus James Edgar Closey	1953
Maurice Hayes	1953–1954
Wilfrid Owen	1954–1956
Winston M. Smith	1956-1958
Mary King	1958–1963
Frank Needham	1966–1970?
Percival John Dempsey	1970–1972
W. A. Evans	1972
Don Bethune	1972–1975
George Bryant	1976–1979
Stefan Lipa	1979–1987
Chris Leitch	1988–1993
Margaret Cook	1993–1999
Peter Kane	1999–2003
John Pemberton	2003–2005
Neville Aitchison	2005–2010
David Wilson	2010–2013
John Pemberton	2013–2015
Harry Alchin-Smith	2015–2017
Ewan Cornor	2017–2018
Gloria Bruni	2018–present

=== Party leader ===
Leader	Term
Wilfrid Owen	1954–1959
Cecil William Elvidge	1959–1960 (acting)
P.H. Matthews	1960–1962
Vernon Cracknell	1963–1970
John O'Brien	1970–1972
Bruce Beetham	1972–1986
Neil Morrison	1986–1988
Garry Knapp	1988–1991
John Wright	1991–2001
Grant Gillon	2001–2002
Stephnie de Ruyter	2002–2018
Chris Leitch	2018–2023

=== Deputy party leader ===
Deputy leader	Term
Robert Young	1954–1958
Frederick Charles Roberts	1958–1959
John O'Brien	1960–1970
Tom Weal	1970–1972
Les Hunter	1972–1977
Jeremy Dwyer	1977–1981
Gary Knapp	1981–1985
Alasdair Thompson	1985–1988
Terry Heffernan	1988–1991
Grant Gillon	1994–2000
Stephnie de Ruyter	2000–2002
John Pemberton	2002–2003

=== Members of parliament ===
Member	In office	Affiliation
Vernon Cracknell	1966–1969	Social Credit
Bruce Beetham	1978–1984	Social Credit
Gary Knapp	1980–1987	Social Credit
Gary Knapp	1980–1987	Democrats
Neil Morrison	1984–1987	Social Credit
Neil Morrison	1984–1987	Democrats
Grant Gillon	1996–2002	Alliance
John Wright	1996–2002	Alliance

== Sources ==
- Bryant, George (1981). Beetham. Palmerston North: The Dunmore Press. ISBN 0-908564-73-2.
- Sheppard, Michael (1981). Social Credit Inside and Out. Dunedin: Caveman Publications. ISBN 0-908562-56-X.
- Zavos, Spiro (1981). Crusade: Social Credit's drive for power. Lower Hutt: INL Print. ISBN 0-86464-025-0.
- Milne, Robert Stephen (1966). Political Parties in New Zealand. Oxford, England: Clarendon Press. pp. 299–303.
- The 1966 Encyclopaedia of New Zealand
