= Electoral history of Jack Marshall =

Parliamentary elections of New Zealand

This is a summary of the electoral history of Jack Marshall, Prime Minister of New Zealand (1972), Leader of the National Party (1972–74), and Member of Parliament for Mount Victoria (1946–54) then Karori (1954–75).

== Parliamentary elections ==
=== 1946 election ===
1946 general election: Mount Victoria
Party	Candidate	Votes	%	±%
National	Jack Marshall	6,520	53.09	
Labour	Eugene Casey	5,609	45.67	
Independent Liberal	John Hart Parry	152	1.23	
Majority		911	7.41	
Turnout		12,281	88.44	
Registered electors		13,885		

=== 1949 election ===
1949 general election: Mount Victoria
Party	Candidate	Votes	%	±%
National	Jack Marshall	6,562	58.44	+5.35
Labour	Nathan Richard Seddon	4,572	40.71	
Independent	Julius Hyde	94	0.83	
Majority		1,808	16.10	+8.69
Turnout		11,228	87.45	+0.99
Registered electors		12,839		

=== 1951 election ===
1951 general election: Mount Victoria
Party	Candidate	Votes	%	±%
National	Jack Marshall	6,556	60.06	+1.62
Labour	Frank Kitts	4,358	39.94	
Majority		2,198	20.12	+4.02
Turnout		10,914	84.36	−3.09
Registered electors		12,936		

=== 1954 election ===
General election, 1954: Karori
Party	Candidate	Votes	%	±%
National	Jack Marshall	8,317	53.30	
Labour	Jim Bateman	6,506	41.72	+5.20
Social Credit	Richard Donald McLaren	778	4.98	
Majority		1,811	11.60	
Turnout		15,601	87.88	+0.50
Registered electors		17,751		

=== 1957 election ===
General election, 1957: Karori
Party	Candidate	Votes	%	±%
National	Jack Marshall	9,481	57.35	+4.05
Labour	Keith Spry	6,420	38.83	
Social Credit	Barney Thomas Daniel	555	3.35	
Independent	Thomas Simpson	75	0.45	
Majority		3,061	18.51	+6.91
Turnout		16,531	92.82	+4.94
Registered electors		17,809		

=== 1960 election ===
General election, 1960: Karori
Party	Candidate	Votes	%	±%
National	Jack Marshall	9,841	61.99	+4.64
Labour	Olive Smuts-Kennedy	5,528	34.83	
Social Credit	Dorothy Wild	505	3.18	
Majority		4,313	27.17	+8.66
Turnout		15,874	88.22	−4.60
Registered electors		17,993		

=== 1963 election ===
General election, 1963: Karori
Party	Candidate	Votes	%	±%
National	Jack Marshall	10,312	59.67	−2.32
Labour	Keith Spry	6,292	36.41	
Social Credit	Barney Thomas Daniel	677	3.92	
Majority		4,020	23.26	−3.91
Turnout		17,281	91.34	+3.12
Registered electors		18,919		

=== 1966 election ===
General election, 1966: Karori
Party	Candidate	Votes	%	±%
National	Jack Marshall	10,961	59.40	−0.27
Labour	Peter Blizard	5,691	30.84	
Social Credit	Stuart Dickson	1,798	9.74	
Majority		5,270	28.56	+5.30
Turnout		18,450	86.59	−4.75
Registered electors		21,305		

=== 1969 election ===
General election, 1969: Karori
Party	Candidate	Votes	%	±%
National	Jack Marshall	11,320	65.65	+6.25
Labour	Roy Tombs	5,094	29.55	
Social Credit	Ron England	828	4.80	
Majority		6,226	36.10	+7.54
Turnout		17,242	89.11	+2.23
Registered electors		19,349		

=== 1972 election ===
General election, 1972: Karori
Party	Candidate	Votes	%	±%
National	Jack Marshall	9,825	55.80	−9.85
Labour	Adam Floyd	5,417	30.76	
Values	Brian Dreadon	1,650	9.37	
Social Credit	Ron England	676	3.83	−0.97
New Democratic	George John Ayo	38	0.21	
Majority		4,408	25.03	−11.07
Turnout		17,606	89.77	−0.66
Registered electors		19,611		

== Leadership elections ==
=== 1972 leadership election ===
Name	Votes	Percentage
Jack Marshall	26	59.10%
Robert Muldoon	18	40.90%
