= List of chief executives of New Zealand Railways =

List of chief executives of New Zealand Railways

== New Zealand Government Railways ==
Titled General Manager unless otherwise specified.

No.	Name	Term of office	
1	J. P. Maxwell	1880	1889
2	James McKerrow (Note: Chief Commissioner)	1889	1894
3	Thomas Ronayne	1895	1913
4	E. H. Hiley	1913	1919
5	Richard McVilly	1919	1924
6	F. J. Jones (Note: Chairman, Government Railways Board)	1924	1928
7	H. H. Sterling	1928	1931
8	Col. J. J. Essen (Note: Temporary Chairman, Government Railways Board)	1931	
(7)	H. H. Sterling (Note: Chairman, Government Railways Board)	1931	1936
9	P. G. Rousssel	1931	1932
10	G. H. Mackley	1933	1940
11	Eugene Casey	1940	1944
12	J. Sawyers	1944	1948
13	Frank Aickin	1948	1951
13	Horace Lusty	1951	1955
14	Wilfred Evelyn Hodges (Note: Chairman, Government Railways Board)	1955	1957
15	Alan Gandell	1955	1966
16	Ivan Thomas	1966	1972
17	T M Small	1972	1976
19	Trevor Hayward	1976	1981

Table footnotes:

== New Zealand Railways Corporation ==
The New Zealand Railways Corporation replaced the New Zealand Railways Department in 1982.

Titled "Chief Executive"

No.	Name	Term of office	
1	Trevor Hayward	1982	1983
2	Gordon Purdy	1983	1987
3	Kevin Hyde	1987	1990

== New Zealand Rail Limited ==
Titled Managing Director: New Zealand Rail was renamed Tranz Rail in 1995.

No.	Name	Term of office	
1	Francis Small	1990	2000
