= Catherine Stuart =

Catherine/Katherine Stuart or Stewart may refer to:

- Catherine of Braganza, wife of Charles II of Great Britain
- Catherine Stewart, character in Chloe (film)
- Katie Stuart, full name Katherine Stuart, Canadian actress
- Catherine Stewart (1881-1957), New Zealand politician
- Katherine Stewart (journalist)

== See also ==
- Catrin Stewart, Welsh actress
