= New Zealand Track Evaluation Carriage =

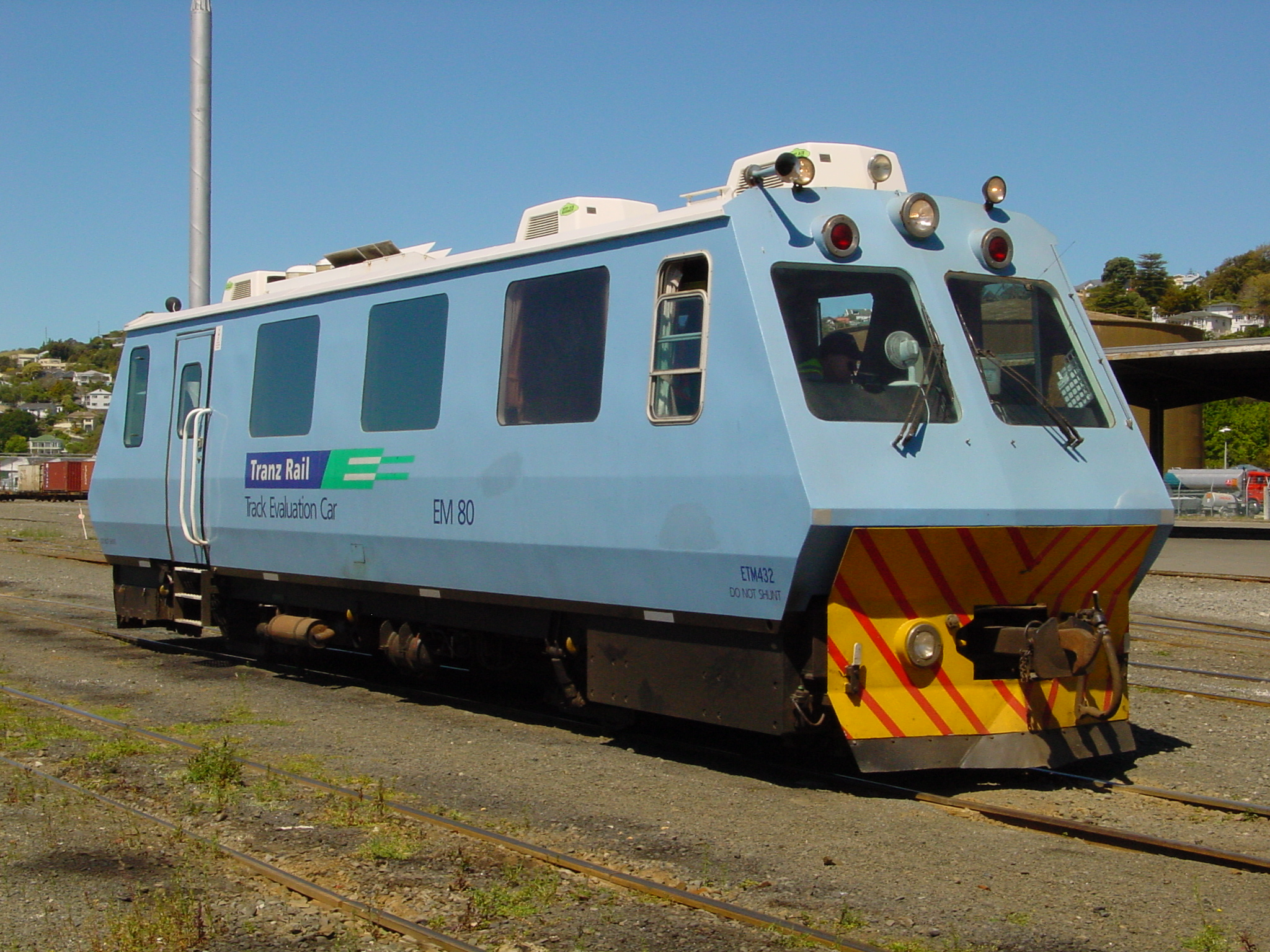
- ETM432 Track Evaluation Car
- Manufacturer: Plasser & Theurer
- Entered service: Current
- Number built: 1
- Number in service: 1
- Fleet numbers: ETM432
- Operators: New Zealand Railways Corporation, Tranz Rail, KiwiRail
- Lines served: All lines

Specifications
- Track gauge: 3 ft 6 in (1,067 mm)

The New Zealand Track Evaluation Carriage is a self-propelled vehicle, usually identified as EM80 or ETM432, and is used in New Zealand to evaluate track conditions.

It is expected to be replaced in its primary role by 2027, but will be kept as a backup.
