= 1974 New Zealand National Party leadership election =

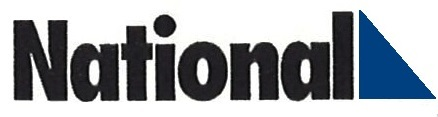
- 9 July 1974
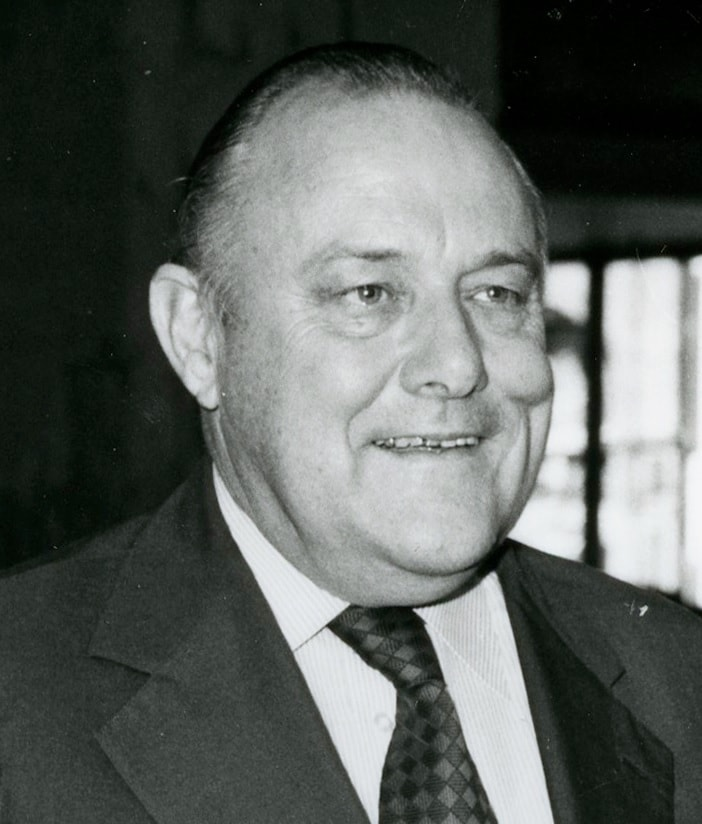
Candidate	Robert Muldoon
Popular vote	elected unopposed
Leader before election
Jack Marshall
Leader after election
Robert Muldoon

The 1974 New Zealand National Party leadership election was held to determine the future leadership of the New Zealand National Party. The election was won by deputy leader and Tamaki MP Robert Muldoon.

== Background ==
Former Prime Minister Jack Marshall's government had been defeated by Labour in the 1972 general election. There had been some caucus dissension in 1974, encouraged by his own deputy, Muldoon, about whether or not Marshall should lead the National Party into the next election, scheduled in 1975. The party executive asked the caucus to affirm that it supported Marshall continuing as leader. On 3 July 1974, the caucus voted 19 to 13 in favour of having a leadership vote. Believing he would probably lose a vote he sought the advice of MP George Gair who strongly urged him not to stand for re-election. Marshall announced his resignation as party leader the next day on 4 July 1974.

== Candidates ==
=== Robert Muldoon ===
Muldoon was a high-profile member of the National Party. He had served as Minister of Finance under Holyoake since 1967 and briefly served as deputy prime minister in 1972 after Holyoake's retirement. It was he whose National's shock win in 1969 was attributed, and as s result Muldoon had challenged Marshall for the leadership in 1972 but was defeated. Muldoon had become a popular figure with the public and adapted well to the new media of television coverage that other politicians struggled with which increased his campaigning abilities. In opposition, Marshall was shown to be ineffectual at the skills required to topple Labour's popular leader Norman Kirk and as a result National's backbenchers were increasingly looking to Muldoon for leadership raising questions of Marshall.

== Result ==
A leadership election was held on 9 July 1974 in which Muldoon was the only candidate and was acclaimed.

== Aftermath ==
Muldoon became Leader of the Opposition and went on to lead the National Party to victory in the 1975 general election, becoming Prime Minister of New Zealand. He remained as his own finance spokesman in Opposition, and in 1975 became the last Prime Minister to date to be his own Minister of Finance. Muldoon would remain in power until the 1984 election. Marshall retired at the 1975 election, serving as Muldoon's Shadow Minister on Overseas Trade until the dissolution of Parliament.
