= Republic of Fiji Islands v Prasad =

2001 Court of Appeal of Fiji judgment

- Court: Court of Appeal of Fiji
- Decided: 1 March 2001
- Citation: (2001) FJCA 2

Case history
- Prior action: (2000) FJHC 121

Court membership
- Judges sitting: Casey P, Barker, Kapi, Ward, Handley JJ

Case opinions
- appeal dismissed; declarations granted Unanimous

Republic of Fiji Islands v Prasad is a 2001 landmark decision of the Court of Appeal of Fiji which upheld the 1997 Constitution of Fiji in the aftermath of the 2000 Fijian coup d'état. The court agreed with the previous High Court of Fiji ruling that the constitution had not been overturned and that Parliament had not been dissolved, but only prorogued. It also found that the office of President of Fiji had only become vacant in December 2000 after Kamisese Mara resigned following the High Court ruling.

The interim government accepted the decision, and new elections were held in August and September 2001.

== Background ==
=== 2000 coups ===
On 19 May 2000 civilian gunmen led by failed businessman George Speight stormed the Fijian Parliament and took Prime Minister Mahendra Chaudhry and his government hostage. Speight claimed to have seized power on behalf of ethnic Fijians, and purported to have revoked the 1997 constitution and appointed himself interim president and opposition MP Timoci Silatolu as interim prime minister. President Kamisese Mara responded by declaring a state of emergency. Following a breakdown in law and order, military defections, and a gun battle at Parliament, Mara sacked Chaudhry for being unable to perform his functions and appointed Tevita Momoedonu, the sole cabinet member who was not in parliament when it was seized, as prime minister. After advising Mara to prorogue parliament for six months, Momoedonu resigned, leaving Mara with "unfettered executive authority".

On 28 May a further breakdown of law and order saw Chief Justice Timoci Tuivaga and other judges advise RFMF commander Frank Bainimarama to take control on the basis of necessity. After a meeting with Bainimarama and former prime minister Sitiveni Rabuka, president Mara purportedly resigned. Bainimarama then declared martial law, revoked the 1997 constitution, and took control of the country, declaring himself head of state. On 3 July 2000 the military transferred its powers to an unelected, all-indigenous Fijian interim government headed by Laisenia Qarase and tasked it with developing a new constitution which would ensure the "paramountcy" of indigenous Fijians.

=== High court ===
On 4 July 2000 Chandrika Prasad, a farmer, filed a case with the High Court at Lautoka claiming to have been adversely affected by the coup. Prasad had been forced off his land by racial violence in the wake of the coup. He sought declarations that the coup was unsuccessful, that the 19 May state of emergency was unconstitutional, that the purported abrogation of the constitution was unconstitutional and the constitution remained in force, that the parliament of Fiji still existed, and that the elected government was still the lawful government. Prasad was assisted in his case by the Fiji Human Rights Commission.

On 15 November 2000 Justice Anthony Gates delivered his judgement, finding that the 19 May 2000 declaration of a state of emergency was lawful, but otherwise finding for Prasad. Speight's purported overturning of the constitution did not conform to the rules for constitutional amendments, so was illegal. The same logic applied to Bainimarama's purported abrogation. The doctrine of necessity invoked by Bainimarama as justification for his actions only permitted upholding the rule of law and the existing constitution, and could not be used to subvert them. The interim government was therefore illegal. Parliament should be summoned as soon as practicable, and the President should appoint a new prime minister who held the confidence of the House of Representatives.

On 21 December 2000 president Mara officially resigned, with his resignation backdated to 29 May.

== Judgment ==
The interim government appealed the court ruling, arguing that the court did not have jurisdiction to decide its legality and that the 1997 constitution had in fact been abrogated. The court heard the case in February 2001, and delivered its judgment on 1 March. The court found that it had jurisdiction to hear the case, and agreed with the High Court that "the doctrine of necessity does not authorise permanent changes to a written constitution, let alone its complete abrogation". It nevertheless considered the question of whether the coup and its aftermath had created a new legal order. Applying an efficacy test, the court found that it had not, as a rival government was "ready and willing" to resume office should the constitution be upheld, and that the change had not been overwhelmingly accepted by the Fijian people. As a result, it disallowed the appeal, but due to the change in circumstances since the high court decision, replaced the high court's declarations with the following:

1. The 1997 Constitution remains the supreme law of the Republic of The Fiji Islands and has not been abrogated
2. Parliament has not been dissolved. It was prorogued on 27 May 2000 for six months.
3. The office of the president under the 1997 Constitution became vacant when the resignation of Ratu Sir Kamisese Mara took effect on 15 December 2000. In accordance with section 88 of that Constitution, the vice-president may perform the functions of the President until 15 March 2001 unless a president is sooner appointed under section 90.

In passing, the court also noted the Judicial Committee of the Privy Council's 1969 decision on Madzimbamuto v Lardner-Burke on the acts of illegal regimes, ruling that the actions of the interim regime could be recognised as valid insofar as they are required for the ordinary orderly running of the state, do not impair the rights of citizens, and do not aid in the usurpation of the constitutional order.

== Aftermath ==
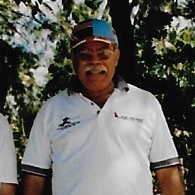
Laisenia Qarase was ultimately reappointed prime minister.

During the court hearing the interim government had promised to abide by the court's ruling, and they accepted the ruling after it had been made. Ousted Prime Minister Mahendra Chaudhry called for immediate elections to restore democratic rule.

On 7 March 2001 the interim government resigned, but acting president Josefa Iloilo refused their resignations and asked them to remain in a caretaker capacity.

On 13 March the Great Council of Chiefs appointed Iloilo as president, with Jope Seniloli as vice-president. The following day he sacked Choudhary and reappointed Tevita Momoedonu, who had served briefly in the role following the coup, as prime minister. Momoedonu formally advised Iloilo to dissolve parliament, then resigned after less than a day in office; Iloilo then reappointed Qarase. The dismissal, dissolution, and reappointment were subsequently unsuccessfully challenged by the Citizens Constitutional Forum in Yabaki v President of the Republic of the Fiji Islands. Elections were finally held on 25 August and 1 September.

== Significance ==
The case is considered to be "the most important constitutional case in the history of Fiji", and a landmark case on the doctrine of necessity and the creation of new legal orders by coups and revolutions. It was the first case where a domestic court had been willing to rule that a current regime which had come to power by a coup was illegal.
