= Stella Casey =

New Zealand activist (1924–2000)

Dame Stella Katherine Casey DBE (née Wright; 22 May 1924 – 7 July 2000) was a New Zealand campaigner for social issues as well as a prominent member of various national organisations.

== Early life and family ==
Stella Katherine Wright was born in New Plymouth on 22 May 1924, the daughter of Stella Regina Wright (née Hickey, 1887–1973), a schoolteacher prior to her wedding, and William James Wright (1883–1959). She was a Roman Catholic.

She was raised at her family dairy farm in Taranaki and was educated at Opunake District High School, and Sacred Heart College, Christchurch. She went on to study at Victoria University College from 1947, graduating Bachelor of Arts in 1948.

In 1948, she married Maurice Eugene Casey, a lawyer and later Judge in the Court of Appeal, who was born in 1923. The couple had either nine or ten children (sources vary).

== Community activities ==
Casey was a member of the Catholic Women's League, the National Council of Women, the Christchurch Polytechnic Council and the New Zealand branch of the Federation of University Women. She compiled a history of the Catholic Women's League of New Zealand which was published just after her death in 2000.

She started her first campaign in 1969 in Browns Bay on Auckland's East Coast Bays when she objected to pornography being on display in shops; this resulted in a nationwide debate. She also lobbied against the use of drugs, raising the issue with local politicians and writing an article titled "Drugs and the Young New Zealander" for the Catholic Women's League in the Diocese of Auckland Publications.

== Honours and awards ==
In the 1991 New Year Honours, Casey was appointed a Dame Commander of the Order of the British Empire, for services to the community. Later that year, in the Queen's Birthday Honours, her husband, by then a Court of Appeal judge, was appointed a Knight Bachelor. In 1993, Stella Casey was awarded the New Zealand Suffrage Centennial Medal.

== Death ==
Casey died in Wellington on 7 July 2000, aged 76. Her husband died in 2012.
