= Charles Bowden (politician) =

New Zealand politician (1886–1972)

The Honourable Charles Bowden
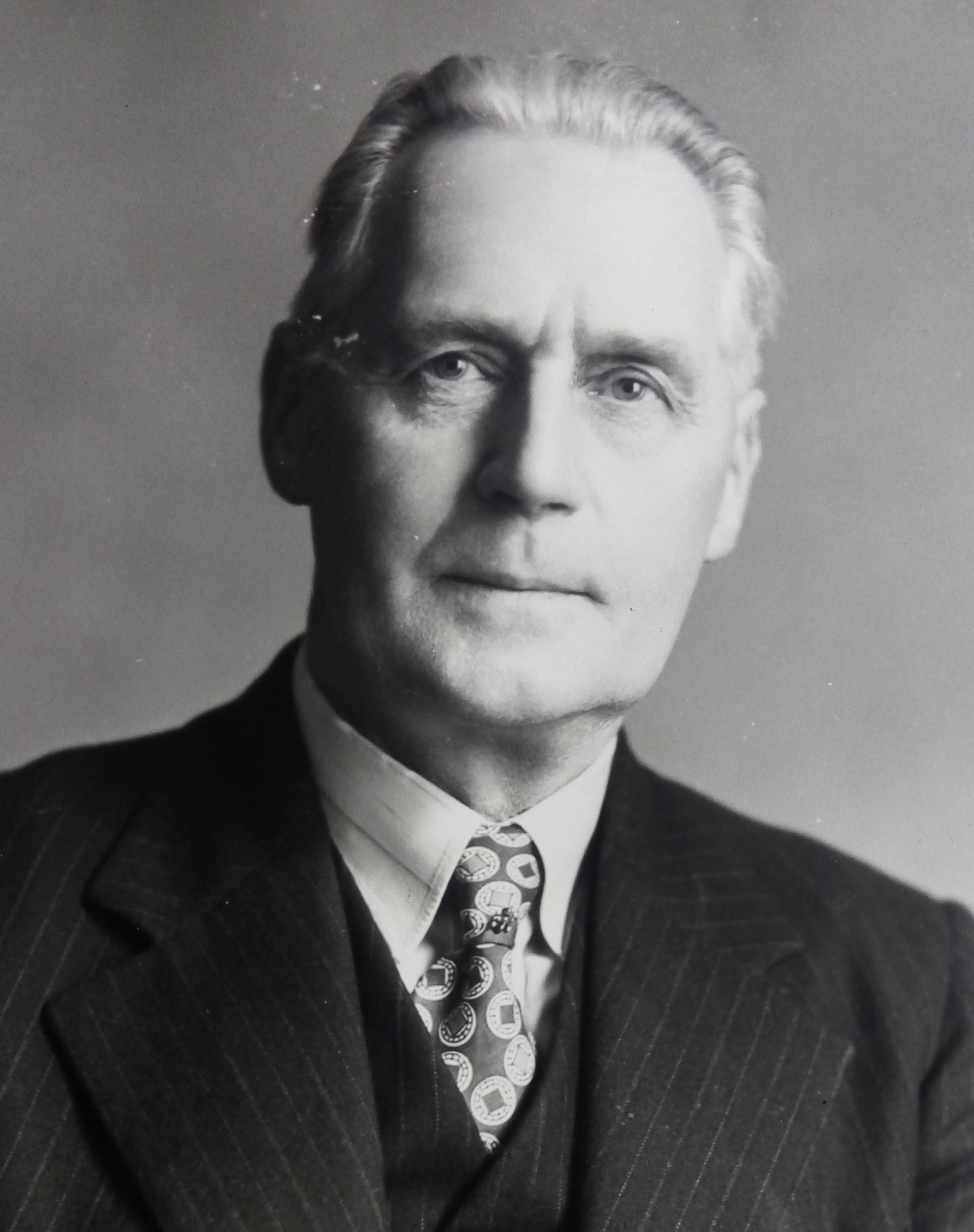

36th Minister of Customs
- In office 13 December 1949 – 26 November 1954
- Prime Minister: Sidney Holland
- Preceded by: Walter Nash
- Succeeded by: Dean Eyre

Personal details
- Born: 13 December 1886 Dunedin, New Zealand
- Died: 10 July 1972 (aged 85) Wellington, New Zealand
- Party: National

Charles Moore Bowden (1886 – 10 July 1972) was a New Zealand politician of the National Party.

== Biography ==
=== Early life and career ===
Bowden was born in Dunedin in 1886, son of John and Agnes Sophia Moore. He received his education at Auckland Grammar School. After school, he was briefly with an auctioneering firm before joining Kempthorne Prosser. When his family moved to Wellington, he joined W.M. Bannatyne and Co, where he moved into accounting. He became self-employed and established the accountancy firm Bowden, Bass and Cox in 1923. In the same year, he was president of the New Zealand Society of Accountants, and afterwards president of the Wellington branch of the Chamber of Commerce (1924–1925). For almost a decade, he was chairman and managing director of Wairarapa Farmers in Masterton (1927–1936), and he was a director of Bannatyne and Co.

=== Political career ===
New Zealand Parliament
Years	Term	Electorate	Party
1943–1946	27th	Wellington West	National
1946–1949	28th	Karori	National
1949–1951	29th	Karori	National
1951–1954	30th	Karori	National

In 1941 Bowden was elected to the Wellington City Council serving one term. He represented the Wellington West electorate in Parliament from 1943 to 1946, and then the Karori electorate from 1946 to 1954, when he retired.

Bowden was a cabinet minister in the First National Government. He was Minister of Customs (1949–1954), Minister of Industries and Commerce (1949–1950), and Minister of Stamp Duties (1949–1952). In 1953, he was awarded the Queen Elizabeth II Coronation Medal. In 1955, Bowden was granted the use of the title of "Honourable" for life, having served more than three years as a member of the Executive Council.

=== Later life and death ===
In May 1955 he was appointed chairman of the Ross Sea Committee to organise New Zealand participation in the Commonwealth Trans-Antarctic Expedition. Bowden Glacier lying on the southeast flank of Salient Ridge that flows northeast to Blue Glacier, Victoria Land, was named by the New Zealand Geographic Board in 1994 for Bowden during Sir Edmund Hillary's South Pole Expedition, part of the Commonwealth Trans-Antarctic Expedition in 1957.

He was appointed director of the Bank of New Zealand and chairman of Heritage New Zealand.

Bowden died on 10 July 1972.

== Notes ==
Political offices
Preceded by Walter Nash	Minister of Customs; 1949-1954	Succeeded by Dean Eyre
New Zealand Parliament
Preceded by Catherine Stewart	Member of Parliament for Wellington West; 1943–1946	Constituency abolished
New constituency	Member of Parliament for Karori; 1946–1954	Succeeded by Jack Marshall
