= 1940 New Zealand National Party leadership election =

New Zealand political party leadership election

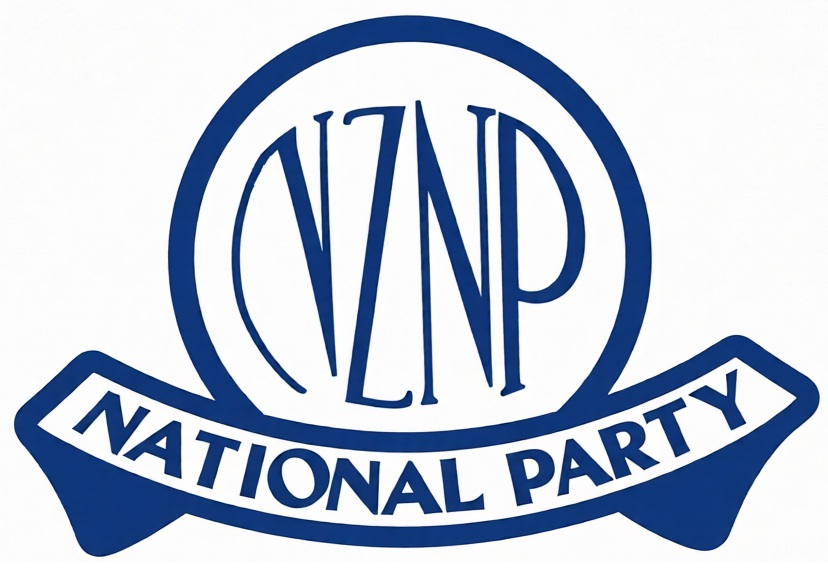
- 26 November 1940
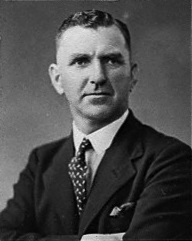

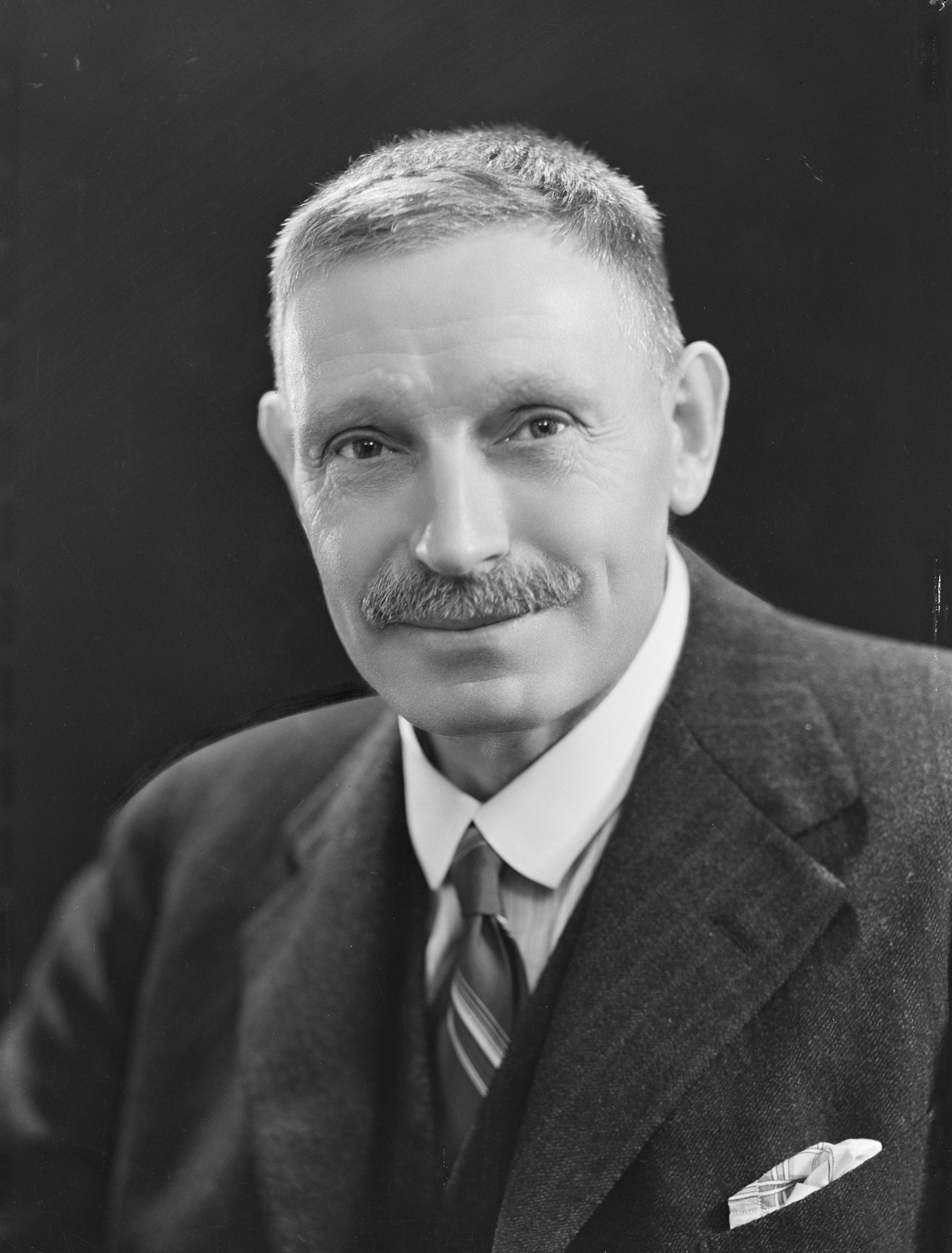
Candidate	Sidney Holland	Adam Hamilton
Popular vote	13	8
Percentage	61.90%	38.10%
Leader before election
Adam Hamilton
Leader after election
Sidney Holland

The 1940 New Zealand National Party leadership election was held to determine the future leadership of the New Zealand National Party. The election was won by Christchurch North MP Sidney Holland.

== Background ==
In July 1940, Hamilton together with Gordon Coates joined the new "War Cabinet" after receiving invitations from Labour Prime Minister Peter Fraser. Sidney Holland together with several other National MPs began to question in caucus whether Hamilton could still carry out the role of Leader of the Opposition in an attempt to oust him. After considerable discussion, the party's dominion executive unanimously decided in November 1940 that Hamilton should be asked to resign. A long discussion in caucus ensued lasting all day which was inconclusive. The next day Hamilton announced he would resign as leader, but would offer himself for election once again in the ensuing ballot.

== Candidates ==
=== Adam Hamilton ===
Hamilton was recognized by his peers and the public as being diligent, transparent and experienced, however he lacked the drive needed for the leadership of a party in opposition. He had never been able to truly establish himself as a leader in his own right, being seen by many as a "seat warmer" for Coates, his previous leader. Hamilton also carried the unpopular legacy of being a senior minister in the coalition government.

=== Sidney Holland ===
Holland had for several years had been acting as Hamilton's private secretary. He was regarded as more dynamic personality that could bring much needed vigour to the opposition benches. In addition, as he had only been an MP since 1935 he did not (in contrast to Hamilton) have any association with the now negatively viewed coalition government from the depression.

== Result ==
The election was conducted through a members ballot by National's parliamentary caucus. The following table gives the ballot results:

Name	Votes	Percentage
Sidney Holland	13	61.90%
Adam Hamilton	8	38.10%

== Aftermath ==
Holland served as Leader of the Opposition for nine years until the National Party won their first general election in 1949 where he became prime minister. Hamilton remained a part of the War Cabinet, which ironically was later joined by Holland, but stayed with National, unlike Coates who became an independent MP. Hamilton contested the 1943 election as a National candidate but did not seek re-election in 1946 choosing to retire.
