= Mabel Newlands =

New Zealand community leader

Mabel Annie Newlands (née Fielding, 1 July 1902 – 13 February 1983), known as Mabel Newlands and also Ann Newlands, was a New Zealand community leader. Born in Pleasant Point, New Zealand, on 1 July 1902, she was a key member of the New Zealand delegation that participated in the drafting of the Universal Declaration of Human Rights and justice of the peace. She unsuccessfully contested the Ashburton electorate in the 1946 election, but Geoff Gerard as the incumbent managed to increase his majority.
