= 1945 New Zealand census =

National census of New Zealand in 1945

The 1945 New Zealand census was held on 25 September. Total population figures for cities, boroughs and counties are included in the 1946 Year Book. It was published in ten volumes, giving information such as population movement, density, housing, jobs, distance from public transport, country of birth, race and religion. Total population, including forces still abroad, was 1,747,679, and was quite unevenly distributed, as shown in this table, which in the printed document is illustrated with maps of both main islands –

City / borough / county	km^{2}	Population per km^{2}
Eden	36	461.39
Waimairi	124	144.21
Heathcote	49	105.79
Peninsula	104	28.76
Manukau	622	21.04
Halswell	104	19.85
Makara	262	19.15
Paparua	352	18.88
Waimate West	215	13.09
Waipa	1,127	13.01
Kairanga	484	11.70
Rangiora	249	11.58
Hawera	495	11.35
Taranaki	593	11.24
Franklin	1,427	10.81
Hutt	1,165	9.88
Piako	1,150	9.50
Manawatu	686	9.11
Waikato	1,676	8.53
Hauraki Plains	603	7.95
Springs	236	7.95
Oroua	492	7.57
Tauranga	1,577	7.37
Egmont	619	7.18
Newmarket	1	6.33
Inglewood	484	6.29
Levels	681	6.25
Eltham	536	6.22
St. Kilda	2	6.14
Malvern	647	5.56
Horowhenua	1,409	5.52
Mount Eden	6	5.29
Matamata	2,409	5.06
Ohinemuri	614	4.98
Otamatea	1,090	4.86
Pahiatua	741	4.86
Ellesmere	596	4.67
Waikouaiti	808	4.67
Raglan	2,424	4.36
Woodville	404	4.36
Stratford	1,085	4.36
Kowai	407	4.29
Rodney	1,235	4.13
Devonport	4	4.09
Riccarton	3	4.05
Whangaroa	622	3.90
Dannevirke	1,111	3.90
Mount Albert	10	3.86
Otorohanga	1,554	3.78
Eyre	453	3.75
Petone	5	3.71
Hawke's Bay	4,333	3.40
Cook	2,049	3.36
Waipukurau	313	3.32
Akaroa	438	3.32
Mangonui	2,481	3.05
Napier	9	3.05
Hobson	1,932	2.97
Geraldine	1,790	2.93
Wellington City	66	2.93
Waiapu	2,054	2.90
Waimea	3,986	2.90
Wanganui	1,191	2.86
Mt Herbert	171	2.86
Onehunga	8	2.86
Waitotara	1,212	2.78
Bruce	1,347	2.78
Rotoroa	2,562	2.74
Auckland City	74	2.63
Christchurch City	67	2.63
Timaru	11	2.55
Southland	9,676	2.47
Whakatane	4,343	2.43
Matakaoa	764	2.43
Wairarapa S.	1,140	2.43
Westport	3	2.39
Waipawa	1,357	2.36
Kiwitea	930	2.36
Kawhia	855	2.32
Waitomo	2,945	2.28
Uawa	663	2.28
Patea	1,531	2.28
Kaitieke	1,424	2.28
Eketahuna	805	2.28
Taieri	2,339	2.28
Clutha	2,631	2.28
Hamilton	15	2.28
Wairoa	3,556	2.20
Clifton	1,150	2.16
Hastings	11	2.16
Thames	1,085	2.12
Rangitikei	4,338	2.08
Hawera	4	2.08
Oamaru	6	2.08
Masterton	1,518	2.05
Wairewa	440	2.05
Otahuhu	5	2.05
Coromandel	1,137	2.01
Palmerston N City	20	2.01
Mauriceville	298	1.97
S. Invercargill	9	1.97
Takaka	1,181	1.85
One Tree Hill	10	1.85
Oxford	824	1.81
Tauranga	4	1.81
Milton	1	1.81
New Plymouth	17	1.74
Waimate	3,582	1.70
Gisborne	14	1.70
Port Chalmers	2	1.66
Dunedin City	62	1.66
Ellerslie	3	1.62
Wanganui City	23	1.62
Ohura	1,077	1.58
Marlborough	4,973	1.58
Ashburton	6,369	1.58
Lower Hutt City	31	1.58
Hokitika	3	1.58
Ashburton	8	1.58
Featherston	2,466	1.54
Invercargill City	24	1.54
Patangata	1,704	1.47
Cheviot	847	1.47
Waitaki	6,195	1.47
Kaikoura	2,406	1.43
Takapuna	11	1.43
Taumarunul	2,274	1.35
Waimarino	2,287	1.35
Blenheim	7	1.35
Inangahua	2,458	1.31
Opotiki	3,647	1.27
Dannevirke	5	1.27
Greymouth	10	1.27
Waimate	3	1.27
Masterton	12	1.24
Queenstown	1	1.24
Akitio	831	1.20
New Lynn	6	1.20
Green Island	4	1.20
Waikohu	2,732	1.16
Grey	4,090	1.16
Waihemo	875	1.16
Otorohanga	1	1.16
Tuapeka	3,595	1.12
Papatoetoe	5	1.12
Johnsonville	3	1.12
Whangarei	14	1.08
Weber	306	1.04
Rangiora	4	1.04
Castlepoint	526	1.00
Te Awamutu	5	1.00
Nelson City	20	1.00
Temuka	3	1.00
Balclutha	3	1.00
Gore	8	1.00
Buller	5,050	0.97
Waipara	2,427	0.97
Feilding	8	0.97
Upper Hutt	9	0.97
Levin	5	0.93
Pahiatua	3	0.93
Mosgiel	4	0.93
Wallace	9,653	0.89
Rotorua	13	0.89
Northcote	5	0.85
Morrinsville	4	0.85
Foxton	3	0.85
Tapanui	1	0.85
Tahunanui	2	0.85
Huntly	6	0.81
Marton	6	0.81
Akaroa	1	0.81
Nightcaps	1	0.81
Kawakawa (Bay of Islands)	1	0.81
Ashley	800	0.77
Maniototo	3,471	0.77
Cambridge	5	0.77
Opotiki	3	0.77
Waipukurau	4	0.77
Kaiapoi	4	0.77
Winton	2	0.77
Whangamomona	1,158	0.73
Sounds	1,308	0.73
Stratford	8	0.73
Matamata	4	0.69
Whakatane	6	0.69
Wairoa	6	0.69
Inglewood	3	0.69
Great Barrier Is	285	0.66
Collingwood	1,456	0.66
Eastbourne	6	0.66
Havelock North	3	0.66
Te Kuiti	7	0.62
Paeroa	6	0.62
Geraldine	2	0.62
Waverley	2	0.62
Leeston	2	0.62
Selwyn	2,471	0.58
Thames	11	0.58
Otaki	6	0.58
Carterton	5	0.58
Picton	4	0.58
Runanga	5	0.58
Awatere	2,639	0.54
Chatham Is	963	0.54
Ngaruawahia	5	0.54
Taumarunui	8	0.54
Waitara	6	0.54
Opunake	3	0.54
Naseby	0	0.54
Rawene (Hokianga)	1	0.54
Waitemata	1,572	0.52
Taupo	8,474	0.50
Vincent	7,568	0.50
Featherston	3	0.50
Lyttelton	10	0.50
Alexandra	3	0.50
Mackenzie	7,094	0.46
Birkenhead	12	0.46
Eltham	6	0.46
Mataura	5	0.46
Riverton	3	0.46
Henderson	5	0.46
Glen Eden	5	0.46
Howick	4	0.46
Taradale	6	0.46
Manaia	2	0.46
Normanby (Hawera)	1	0.46
Havelock (Marlborough	1	0.46
Papakura	8	0.42
Mt Maunganui	4	0.42
Te Puke	4	0.42
Raetihi	4	0.42
Taihape	8	0.42
Shannon	3	0.42
Kaitangata	5	0.42
Hikurangi	4	0.42
Putaruru	4	0.42
Amuri	5,843	0.39
Westland	11,422	0.39
Pukekohe	14	0.39
Woodville	4	0.39
Patea	6	0.39
West Harbour	8	0.39
Roxburgh	2	0.39
Bluff	9	0.39
Pohangina	671	0.35
Murchison	3,657	0.35
Kaitaia	5	0.35
Manurewa	8	0.35
Waihi	17	0.35
Te Aroha	11	0.35
Lawrence	2	0.35
Cromwell	3	0.35
Bull's	3	0.35
Takaka (Takaka)	2	0.35
Dargaville	11	0.31
Martinborough	4	0.31
Motueka	10	0.31
Palmerston	4	0.31
Kaikohe	5	0.31
Helensville	5	0.31
Wyndham	3	0.31
Kihikihi (Waipa)	2	0.31
Tawera	2,437	0.27
Waipawa	7	0.27
Ohakune	8	0.27
Eketahuna	4	0.27
Kamo	3	0.27
Waiuku	5	0.27
Tuakau	5	0.27
Hunterville	3	0.27
Pleasant Point	3	0.27
Kaponga (Eltham)	2	0.27
Southbridge (Ellesmere)	2	0.27
Edendale (Southland)	3	0.27
Greytown	8	0.23
Manunui	5	0.23
Ohura	3	0.23
Otautau	4	0.23
Kawhia (Kawhia)	2	0.23
Hokianga	1,588	0.19
Bay of Islands	2,134	0.19
Stewart Is	1,735	0.19
Richmond	11	0.19
Kumara	3	0.19
Leamington	5	0.19
Onerahi (Whangarei)	4	0.19
Te Karaka (Waikohu)	3	0.19
Whangarei	2,704	0.18
Lake	10,028	0.15
Hampden	3	0.15
Arrowtown	2	0.15
Warkworth	6	0.15
Tinwald	6	0.15
Lumsden	5	0.15
Russell (Bay of Islands)	4	0.15
Outram (Taieri)	4	0.15
Clinton (Clutha)	4	0.15
Waikouaiti	8	0.12
Mangaweka	4	0.12
Mercer (Franklin)	4	0.12
Te Kauwhata (Waikato	5	0.12
Brunner	23	0.08
Kohukohu (Hokianga)	4	0.08
Ohaupo (Waipa)	5	0.08
Patutahi (Cook)	5	0.08
Ross	15	0.04
Fiord	7,861	0.00

Usually, a census is held in New Zealand every five years. However, due to World War II, the 1941 census was postponed through section 36 of the Finance Act, 1940, which authorised the census due in 1941 to be taken between 1942 and 1945 (inclusive). The last completed census had been held in 1936, i.e. nine years earlier.

As Minister of Industries and Commerce, Dan Sullivan was in charge of the Census and Statistics Department and in 1943, he commented that there was little hope for the census to be taken while the war was still going. In early April 1945, it became known that the government had plans to hold the census later that year and on 11 April 1945, acting Prime Minister Walter Nash confirmed that it would take place during the coming September. One objective with the 1945 date was to be able to redefine electorate boundaries just prior to the 1946 general election. Bringing the census forward affected the census data. With World War II continuing until September 1945, with thousands of young men still overseas and the economy still geared to wartime conditions. There was lobbying from conservative circles, for example the Auckland Chamber of Commerce, the Otago-Southland Manufacturers' Association, and the New Zealand Farmers' Federation, for the census to be held in 1946 as originally scheduled. In an editorial, The New Zealand Herald also argued for adherence to the normal schedule, for example to make it easier for statisticians to provide timeline data (since 1881, the census had been held every five years).

Census returns were released as they became known, on a city, borough, town district, or county basis. The first preliminary results were those issued for Havelock Town District, which appeared in newspapers on 3 October 1945. The results from the census were an input to the 1946 electoral redistribution. As the government had, in a surprise move, abolished the country quota through the Electoral Amendment Act, 1945, the redistribution changed the boundaries of every electorate prior to the 1946 general election.
