= Wally Hudson =

New Zealand politician

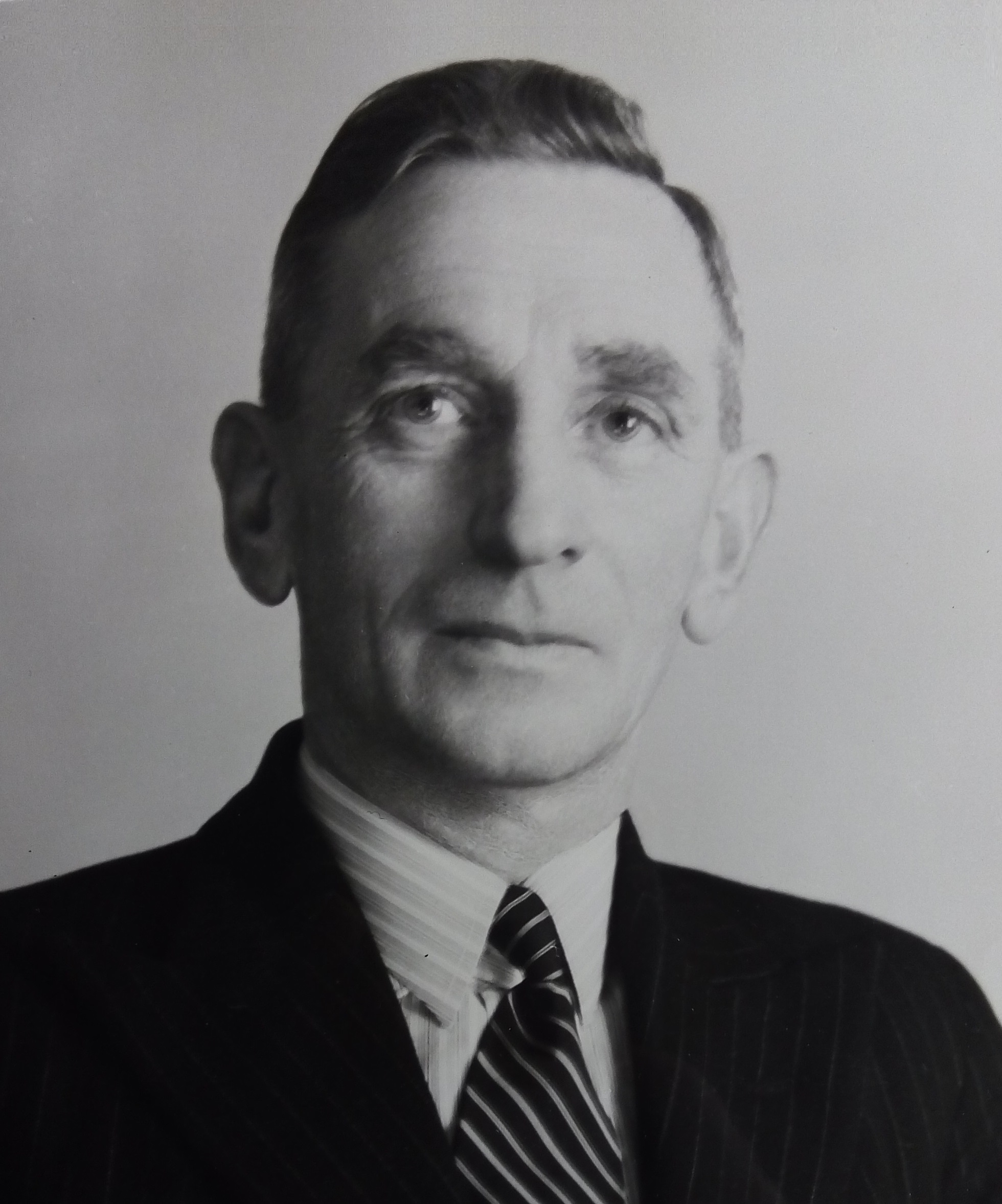
- Hudson in c. 1950

Member of the New Zealand Parliament for Mornington
- In office 27 November 1946 – 30 November 1963

Dunedin City Councillor
- In office 19 June 1945 – 19 November 1947
- Preceded by: Jim Munro

Personal details
- Born: 18 July 1897 Caversham, New Zealand
- Died: 9 June 1972 (aged 74) Dunedin, New Zealand
- Party: Labour
- Spouse: Esther Marion Campbell
- Relatives: Fred Jones (brother-in-law)
- Profession: Bookbinder

Walter Arthur Hudson (18 July 1897 – 9 June 1972) was a New Zealand politician of the Labour Party.

== Biography ==
=== Early life and career ===
Hudson was born in Caversham in 1897. He was educated at the Caversham School and later Caversham Technical College. He then entered the printing trade and became a bookbinder. In 1920 he married Esther Marion Campbell. In 1930 Hudson became an executive member of the Otago branch of the Printing Trades Union and served for four years as president, later becoming vice-president of the national union and later a life member. Hudson was also involved in various local bodies and organisations, such as the Caversham School Committee, Caversham Ratepayers' Association, and Disabled Servicemen's League.

He served in the New Zealand Expeditionary Force for two years in France during World War I. Other than those two years he lived his whole life in Dunedin. His sister Jessie married Labour MP Fred Jones. Wally and his wife helped Jones considerably with his constituency work, especially during World War II when Jones when was engrossed in his role as Minister of Defence.

=== Political career ===
New Zealand Parliament
Years	Term	Electorate	Party
1946–1949	28th	Mornington	Labour
1949–1951	29th	Mornington	Labour
1951–1954	30th	Mornington	Labour
1954–1957	31st	Mornington	Labour
1957–1960	32nd	Mornington	Labour
1960–1963	33rd	Mornington	Labour

He joined the Labour Party in 1928 and served in many positions in the local party. He was president of the Dunedin South Electorate Committee, secretary of the Caversham branch and vice-president of the Otago Labour Representation Committee.

Hudson was also active in local-body politics. In 1944 he stood on the Labour ticket for the Dunedin City Council, and was the highest polling unsuccessful candidate. He was appointed to the city council in 1945 to fill a vacancy caused by the death of Jim Munro. He lost his seat in 1947 along with all other Labour candidates. At the 1950 local elections he was elected to the Otago Hospital Board. He was to remain a member of the Hospital Board for nine years. For six years he was chairman of the Hospital Board's works committee.

He represented the Mornington electorate in the city of Dunedin from the 1946 election to 1963, when he retired. He was the only representative of the Mornington electorate, as the years of its existence match the years that Hudson was a Member of Parliament. Hudson was actively interested in healthcare matters and was twice New Zealand's representative to international parliamentary conferences on the topic in Kenya and Yugoslavia.

In 1953, Hudson was awarded the Queen Elizabeth II Coronation Medal.

=== Later life and death ===
In 1958, Hudson had been appointed to the board of trustees of the Otago Savings' Bank. He was president of the board for two terms; 1962–63 and 1968–69. He was still a board member at the time of his death.

Hudson died in 1972, aged 74, after a short illness.

== Notes ==
New Zealand Parliament
New constituency	Member of Parliament for Mornington; 1946–1963	Constituency abolished
