= Maurice Casey (judge) =

New Zealand jurist

The Right Honourable Sir Maurice Casey

Judge of the Court of Appeal
- In office 6 May 1986 – 28 August 1995

Judge of the High Court
- In office 7 March 1975 – 6 May 1986

Personal details
- Born: Maurice Eugene Casey; 28 August 1923 Christchurch, New Zealand
- Died: 19 January 2012 (aged 88) Auckland, New Zealand
- Spouse: Stella Casey (m. 1948; died 2000)
- Children: 9 or 10
- Relatives: Eugene Casey (father)
- Education: Victoria University College
- Occupation: Lawyer; judge
- Known for: Injunction during Finnigan v New Zealand Rugby Football Union

Sir Maurice Eugene Casey (28 August 1923 – 19 January 2012) was a New Zealand lawyer and judge. He was appointed to the bench of the Supreme Court (now the High Court) in 1975, and elevated to the Court of Appeal in 1986. He retired in 1995.

== Biography ==
Casey was born in Christchurch in 1923. His parents were Eugene and Beatrice Casey. He received his education at St Patrick's College in Wellington, and at Victoria University College (1940–1946) from where he graduated LLM (Hons).

Casey was admitted to the bar in 1946 and practised in Lower Hutt, Blenheim, and from 1950 in Auckland. On 7 March 1975, he was appointed a judge of the Supreme Court, which became the High Court in 1980. He became a household name in New Zealand when his injunction prevented the planned All Blacks tour to South Africa in 1985. Instead, an unofficial tour by a team known as the New Zealand Cavaliers took place in 1986.

Casey was appointed to act as an additional judge of the Court of Appeal for six months from 10 May 1986, and on 6 May 1986 he was formally appointed a judge of that court. The same year, he was appointed privy counsellor. He retired from the Court of Appeal in August 1995. After his retirement, he sat on appellate courts of various Pacific Island nations. He was part of the Fijian Court of Appeal that decided Republic of Fiji Islands v Prasad and found that the interim government installed after the 2000 Fijian coup d'état was unconstitutional.

Casey married Stella Katherine Wright in 1948, and the pair had nine or ten children. His wife was appointed a Dame Commander of the Order of the British Empire, for services to the community, in the 1991 New Year Honours. Casey himself was made a Knight Bachelor six months later in the 1991 Queen's Birthday Honours. He was awarded the Queen Elizabeth II Silver Jubilee Medal in 1977, and the New Zealand 1990 Commemoration Medal in 1990.

Casey died in Auckland on 19 January 2012, his wife having predeceased him in 2000.
