= Mount Victoria (electorate) =

Mount Victoria is a former New Zealand electorate, centred on the inner-city suburb of Mount Victoria in the southern suburbs of Wellington. It existed from 1946 to 1954, and was represented by one Member of Parliament, Jack Marshall.

== Population centres ==
The 1941 New Zealand census had been postponed due to World War II, so the 1946 electoral redistribution had to take ten years of population growth and movements into account. The North Island gained a further two electorates from the South Island due to faster population growth. The abolition of the country quota through the Electoral Amendment Act, 1945, reduced the number and increased the size of rural electorates. None of the existing electorates remained unchanged; 27 electorates were abolished, eight former electorates were re-established, and 19 electorates were created for the first time, including Mount Victoria. The boundary of the electorate in 1946 was as follows:

All that area bounded by a line commencing at a point on the waterfront of Port Nicholson in line with the western boundary of the Boat Harbour; thence southerly along that boundary and the northern side of Herd Street, to and along the middle of Oriental Parade, Prince Street, Roxburgh Street, and Majoribanks Street to the middle of the reserve between Kent Terrace and Cambridge Terrace; thence along the middle of that reserve to and along the middle of Ellice Street, Dufferin Street, and Rugby Street, to a point in line with the western boundary of the Government House Grounds; thence to and along the western boundary of the said Government House Grounds and the production of that boundary to the middle of Hospital Road; thence along the middle of Hospital Road, Adelaide Road, Riddiford Street, and Mein Street, and along the production of the middle-line of the last-mentioned street to the middle of Alexandra Road; thence along the middle of Alexandra Road, Crawford Road, and Seatoun Road [now Rongotai Road] to a point in line with the middle of Onepu Road; thence along the production of the middle-line of Onepu Road to the shore of Evans Bay; thence northerly along the shore of Evans Bay to Point Jerningham, and along the shore of Port Nicholson, including all wharves and extensions seaward, to the point of commencement.

The First Labour Government was defeated in the 1949 election and the incoming National Government changed the Electoral Act, with the electoral quota once again based on total population as opposed to qualified electors, and the tolerance was increased to 7.5% of the electoral quota. There was no adjustment in the number of electorates between the South and North Islands, but the law changes resulted in boundary adjustments to almost every electorate through the 1952 electoral redistribution; only five electorates were unaltered. Five electorates were reconstituted and one was newly created, and a corresponding six electorates were abolished (including Mount Victoria); all of these were in the North Island. These changes took effect with the 1954 election.

== History ==
After the war, Jack Marshall briefly established himself as a barrister, but was soon persuaded to stand as the National Party's candidate for the new Wellington electorate of Mount Victoria in the 1946 election. The electorate was marginal, but he won it by 911 votes. He was, however, nearly disqualified by a technicality—Marshall was employed at the time in a legal case for the government, something which ran afoul of rules barring politicians from giving business to their own firms. However, because Marshall had taken on the case before his election (and so could not have influenced the government's decision to give him employment), it was obvious that there had been no wrongdoing. As such, the Prime Minister, Peter Fraser of the Labour Party, amended the regulations.

Marshall held the electorate for the three terms of its existence. Through the 1954 election, he transferred to the Karori electorate.

Jack Marshall became Prime Minister in the Second National Government in 1972, after Keith Holyoake retired. He was defeated by Norman Kirk in the 1972 election, and was replaced as leader of the National Party by Robert Muldoon in 1974.

=== Members of Parliament ===
The Mount Victoria electorate was represented by one Member of Parliament.

Key

National

Election	Winner
1946 election	Jack Marshall
1949 election	Jack Marshall
1951 election	Jack Marshall
(Electorate abolished 1954; see Wellington Central and Miramar)

== Election results ==
=== 1951 election ===
1951 general election: Mount Victoria
Party	Candidate	Votes	%	±%
National	Jack Marshall	6,556	60.06	+1.62
Labour	Frank Kitts	4,358	39.94	
Majority		2,198	20.12	+4.02
Turnout		10,914	84.36	−3.09
Registered electors		12,936		

=== 1949 election ===
1949 general election: Mount Victoria
Party	Candidate	Votes	%	±%
National	Jack Marshall	6,562	58.44	+5.35
Labour	Nathan Richard Seddon	4,572	40.71	
Independent	Julius Hyde	94	0.83	
Majority		1,808	16.10	+8.69
Turnout		11,228	87.45	+0.99
Registered electors		12,839		

=== 1946 election ===
1946 general election: Mount Victoria
Party	Candidate	Votes	%	±%
National	Jack Marshall	6,520	53.09	
Labour	Eugene Casey	5,609	45.67	
Independent Liberal	John Hart Parry	152	1.23	
Majority		911	7.41	
Turnout		12,281	88.44	
Registered electors		13,885		
