= Mornington (New Zealand electorate) =

Mornington is a former parliamentary electorate from 1946 to 1963, centred on the suburb of Mornington in the city of Dunedin, New Zealand.

== Population centres ==
The 1941 New Zealand census had been postponed due to World War II, so the 1946 electoral redistribution had to take ten years of population growth and movements into account. The North Island gained a further two electorates from the South Island due to faster population growth. The abolition of the country quota through the Electoral Amendment Act, 1945 reduced the number and increased the size of rural electorates. None of the existing electorates remained unchanged, 27 electorates were abolished, eight former electorates were re-established, and 19 electorates were created for the first time, including Mornington. The Mornington electorate was formed from areas that previously belonged to the Dunedin South and Dunedin Central electorates. In the east, it was bounded by the railway. In the north, it extended as far as Brockville. In the southwest, it extended to Green Island.

In the 1952 electoral redistribution, boundary adjustments were minor. In the 1957 electoral redistribution, the Mornington electorate shifted west into areas that previously belonged to the Otago Central electorate. Settlements that were gained in this process include Wingatui, Fairfield, East Taieri, and the town of Mosgiel.

The Mornington electorate was abolished through the 1962 electoral redistribution. Most of its area went to the Otago Central electorate, some went to the Clutha electorate, and its easternmost part went to the Dunedin Central electorate. These changes came into effect through the 1963 election.

== History ==
During this period, the Mornington electorate was represented by one Member of Parliament, Wally Hudson of the Labour Party. When the electorate was abolished in 1963, Hudson retired from Parliament.

=== Members of Parliament ===
Key

Labour

Election	Winner
1946 election	Wally Hudson
1949 election	Wally Hudson
1951 election	Wally Hudson
1954 election	Wally Hudson
1957 election	Wally Hudson
1960 election	Wally Hudson
(Electorate abolished in 1963; see Otago Central, Clutha, and Dunedin Central)

== Election results ==
=== 1960 election ===
1960 general election: Mornington
Party	Candidate	Votes	%	±%
Labour	Wally Hudson	7,635	52.14	−3.41
National	George Robert Thorn	5,389	36.80	
Social Credit	J O Milburn	1,548	10.57	+1.79
Communist	Jack Marston	70	0.47	+0.20
Majority		2,246	15.33	−4.84
Turnout		14,642	90.98	−1.93
Registered electors		16,092		

=== 1957 election ===
1957 general election: Mornington
Party	Candidate	Votes	%	±%
Labour	Wally Hudson	7,756	55.55	+2.02
National	Walter MacDougall	4,939	35.37	+10.42
Social Credit	J O Milburn	1,227	8.78	
Communist	Jack Marston	38	0.27	
Majority		2,817	20.17	−8.40
Turnout		13,960	92.91	+0.85
Registered electors		15,025		

=== 1954 election ===
1954 general election: Mornington
Party	Candidate	Votes	%	±%
Labour	Wally Hudson	7,279	53.53	−10.74
National	Walter MacDougall	3,393	24.95	
Social Credit	J D F Sloan	2,797	20.57	
Communist	John Joseph Hannan	128	0.94	+0.12
Majority		3,886	28.57	+2.79
Turnout		13,597	92.06	+0.89
Registered electors		14,769		

=== 1951 election ===
1951 general election: Mornington
Party	Candidate	Votes	%	±%
Labour	Wally Hudson	9,168	62.47	−1.16
National	Richard Philling	5,385	36.69	
Communist	John Joseph Hannan	121	0.82	−0.60
Majority		3,783	25.78	−2.90
Turnout		14,674	91.17	−3.01
Registered electors		16,094		

=== 1949 election ===
1949 general election: Mornington
Party	Candidate	Votes	%	±%
Labour	Wally Hudson	9,282	63.63	−3.01
National	Geoffrey Stephens	5,097	34.94	
Communist	John Joseph Hannan	208	1.42	
Majority		4,185	28.68	−4.60
Turnout		14,587	94.18	−0.10
Registered electors		15,487		

=== 1946 election ===
1946 general election: Mornington
Party	Candidate	Votes	%	±%
Labour	Wally Hudson	9,372	66.64	
National	Lewis Donald McIver	4,691	33.35	
Majority		4,681	33.28	
Turnout		14,063	94.28	
Registered electors		14,915		
