= Eugene Casey =

New Zealand railways manager (1885–1960)

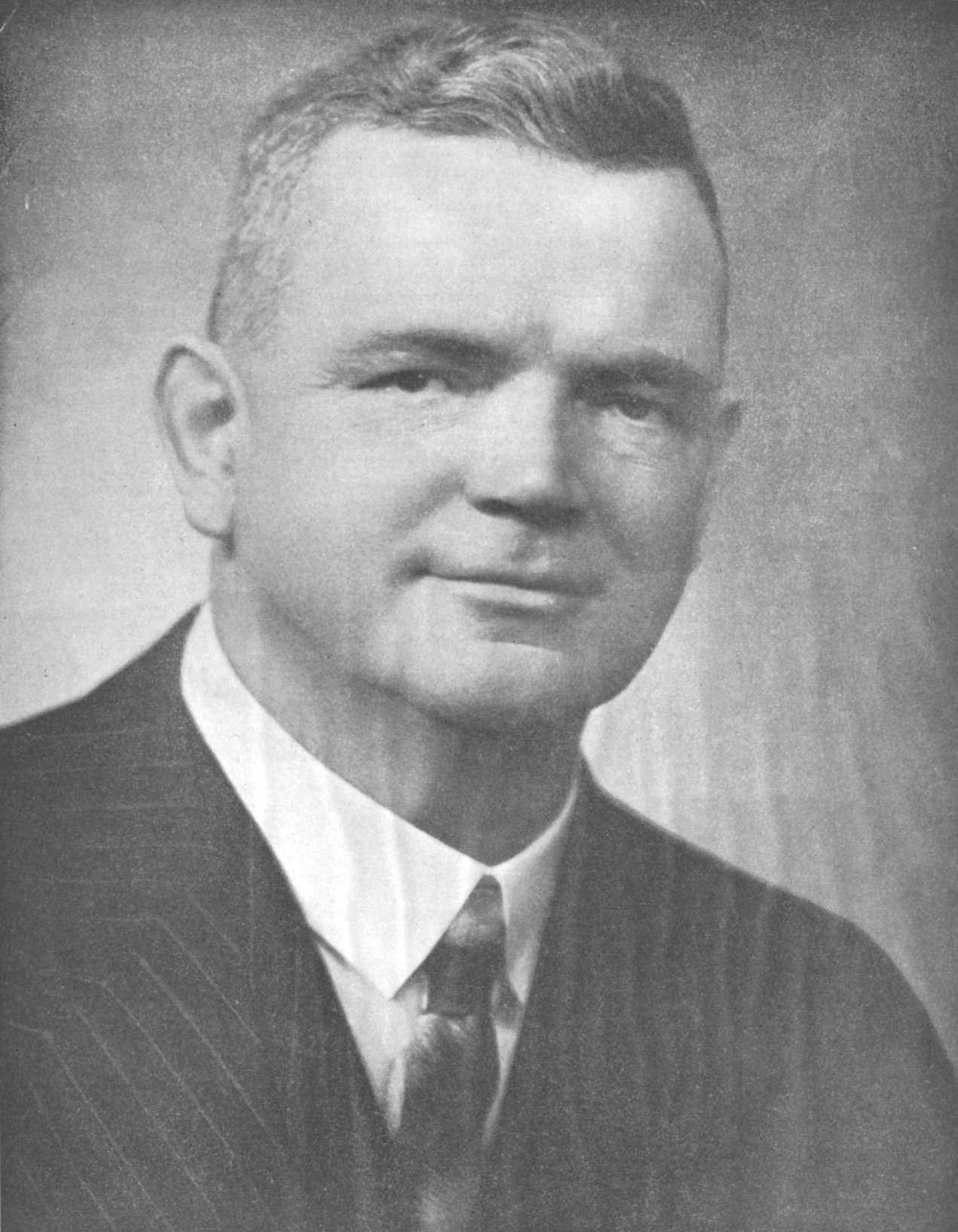
Casey in 1940

Eugene Casey CBE (30 November 1885 – 6 October 1960) was the General Manager of New Zealand Railways Department from 1940 to 1944.

== Biography ==
Casey was born in London on 30 November 1885, moving to New Zealand as a child. He was educated at a Marist Brothers College and then Auckland University College. He was also an associate member of the Institution of Civil Engineers (AMICE).

In 1902 he joined the New Zealand Railways Department as an engineering cadet and was stationed in multiple locations including Greymouth, Wanganui, Auckland and Ohakune. In 1912 he became the assistant engineer for Auckland District. He was then posted to Canterbury in 1921 where he remodeled the station yards on the Midland Line. In 1925 he became and inspecting engineer for new station yards. In 1928 he was appointed divisional superintendent for the North Island. He then became general manager of the department in 1940. Casey retired as general manager in 1944 and was appointed by the government to the Railways Industrial Tribunal, remaining a tribunal member for 15 years.

In the 1946 New Year Honours, Casey was appointed a Commander of the Order of the British Empire, for his services as general manager of the Railways Department.

At the 1946 election he stood as a candidate in the Mount Victoria electorate for the Labour Party. He was defeated by the National Party candidate Jack Marshall. Marshall thought Casey was an able and experienced man, but his professional background was atypical of most Labour candidates of the time. There was an infamous story which circulated in the media prior to the election where Casey met a business friend in the street who commented that he would win the seat as it looked safe for National (thinking erroneously that Casey was the National candidate). At the 1947 local-body elections he stood for the Wellington City Council on the Labour ticket. He was unsuccessful (along with all other Labour candidates) but had the distinction of being the highest polling unsuccessful candidate. At the 1947 and 1948 Labour Party conferences he Casey was a candidate for the party central executive.

Casey died on 6 October 1960 at his home in the Auckland suburb of Milford. He was survived by his wife, four children and 15 grandchildren.

== Personal life and family ==
He married Beatrice Nolan in 1920 at Christchurch, with whom he had two sons and two daughters. One of his sons was Court of Appeal judge Maurice Casey.
