= Clive Drummond =

New Zealand telegraphist, signalman, radio announcer and personality

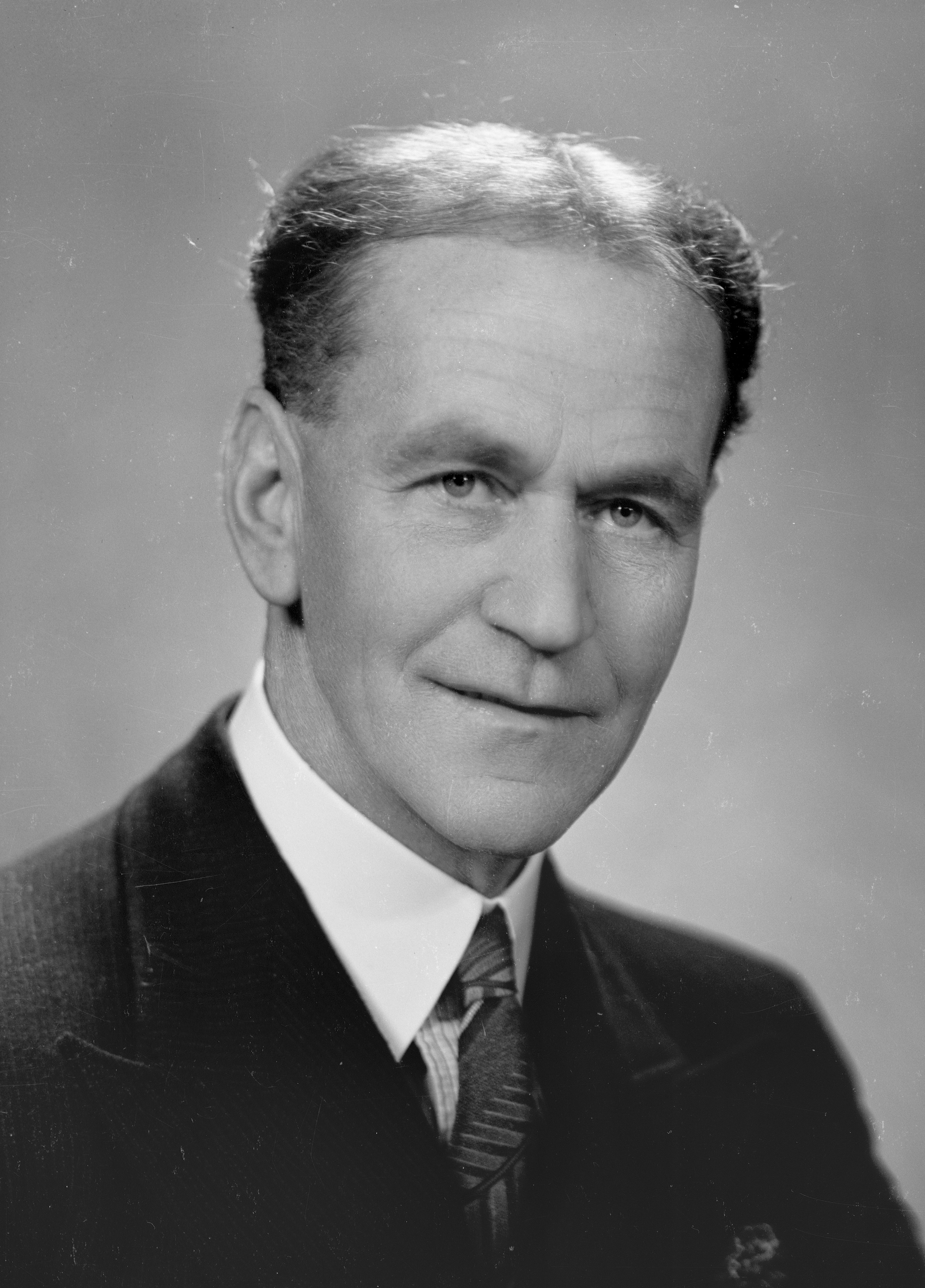
Drummond in 1939

David Archibald Victor Clive Drummond (4 August 1890 – 8 October 1978) was a New Zealand telegraphist, signalman, radio announcer and personality. He was born in Mārahau, New Zealand, on 4 August 1890.

Drummond stood for Parliament in 1943 election, contesting the Wellington West electorate for the People's Movement where he placed third out of four candidates. In 1956 he was elected to the Wellington City Council, serving one term. He did not seek re-election in 1959.
