= Wellington West (New Zealand electorate) =

Wellington West was a parliamentary electorate in the western suburbs of Wellington, New Zealand, from 1938 to 1946. It was represented by two Members of Parliament, including Catherine Stewart, the country's second female MP. It was succeeded by the Karori electorate.

== Population centres ==
The 1931 New Zealand census had been cancelled due to the Great Depression, so the 1937 electoral redistribution had to take ten years of population growth into account. The increasing population imbalance between the North and South Islands had slowed, and only one electorate seat was transferred from south to north. Five electorates were abolished, one former electorate (Onehunga) was re-established, and four electorates were created for the first time, including Wellington West.

By area, the Wellington West electorate was mostly made up from what previously belonged to the Otaki electorate. By population, it mostly gained areas from the Wellington Suburbs electorate. Settlements within the electorate's area were Mākara and Mākara Beach.

== History ==
Wellington West existed from the 1938 election for two parliamentary terms until 1946.

Catherine Stewart was the first representative. She won the election in 1938, when she defeated long-standing MP Robert Wright who had previously represented the Wellington Suburbs electorate. Stewart was the second woman to be elected to Parliament after Elizabeth McCombs. She was defeated in the next (1943 election) by Charles Bowden. At the end of the term in 1946, the electorate was abolished, and Bowden moved to Karori.

=== Members of Parliament ===
Key

Labour National

Election	Winner
1938 election	Catherine Stewart
1943 election	Charles Bowden
(Electorate abolished in 1946, see Karori)

== Election results ==
=== 1943 election ===
1943 general election: Wellington West
Party	Candidate	Votes	%	±%
National	Charles Bowden	7,625	46.80	
Labour	Catherine Stewart	6,442	39.54	−13.38
People's Movement	Clive Drummond	1,050	6.44	
Democratic Labour	Stevenson McDougall	1,042	6.40	
Majority		1,183	7.26	
Turnout		16,293	90.51	+2.76
Registered electors		18,002		

=== 1938 election ===
1938 general election: Wellington West
Party	Candidate	Votes	%	±%
Labour	Catherine Stewart	8,089	52.92	
Independent	Robert Wright (Note: Wright was supported by the National Party.)	7,133	46.66	
Informal votes		64	0.42	
Majority		956	6.25	
Turnout		15,286	87.75	
Registered electors		17,419		

Table footnotes:
