= Ivan Thomas (lawyer) =

New Zealand lawyer (1913–2000

Ivan Thomas (19 June 1913 – 30 March 2000) was the General Manager of New Zealand Railways from 1966 to 1976.

He was born in Waihi the son of Nicholas Thomas a Waihi miner from Cornwall and Grace Naukivis Thomas. He attended Waihi School and Waihi District High School

He joined the NZR on 27 February 1929 as a cadet in the Land Office and then transferred to the Land and Legal Branch.

He studied law, graduating Ll.B. in 1935 when he was awarded the Butterworth Prize in Roman Law. He was one of the Wellington public servants and law clerks who studied part-time at the Victoria University of Wellington.

He transferred to the Law Office in 1936, and (with road transport regulated) appeared for NZR in court and before the Transport Licensing Authority.

In 1951 he was in charge of the Administrative Division of the General Managers’ Office. In 1960 he was appointed Commercial Manager and became Assistant General Manager in 1965.

He was appointed General Manager on 1 November 1966 and retired in 1972.

After his retirement, he was appointed to various government commissions and authorities.
