= 1946 New Zealand general election =

- 26 November 1946 (Māori); 27 November 1946 (general)

All 80 seats in the New Zealand Parliament 41 seats were needed for a majority
- Turnout: 1,047,205 (93.5%)
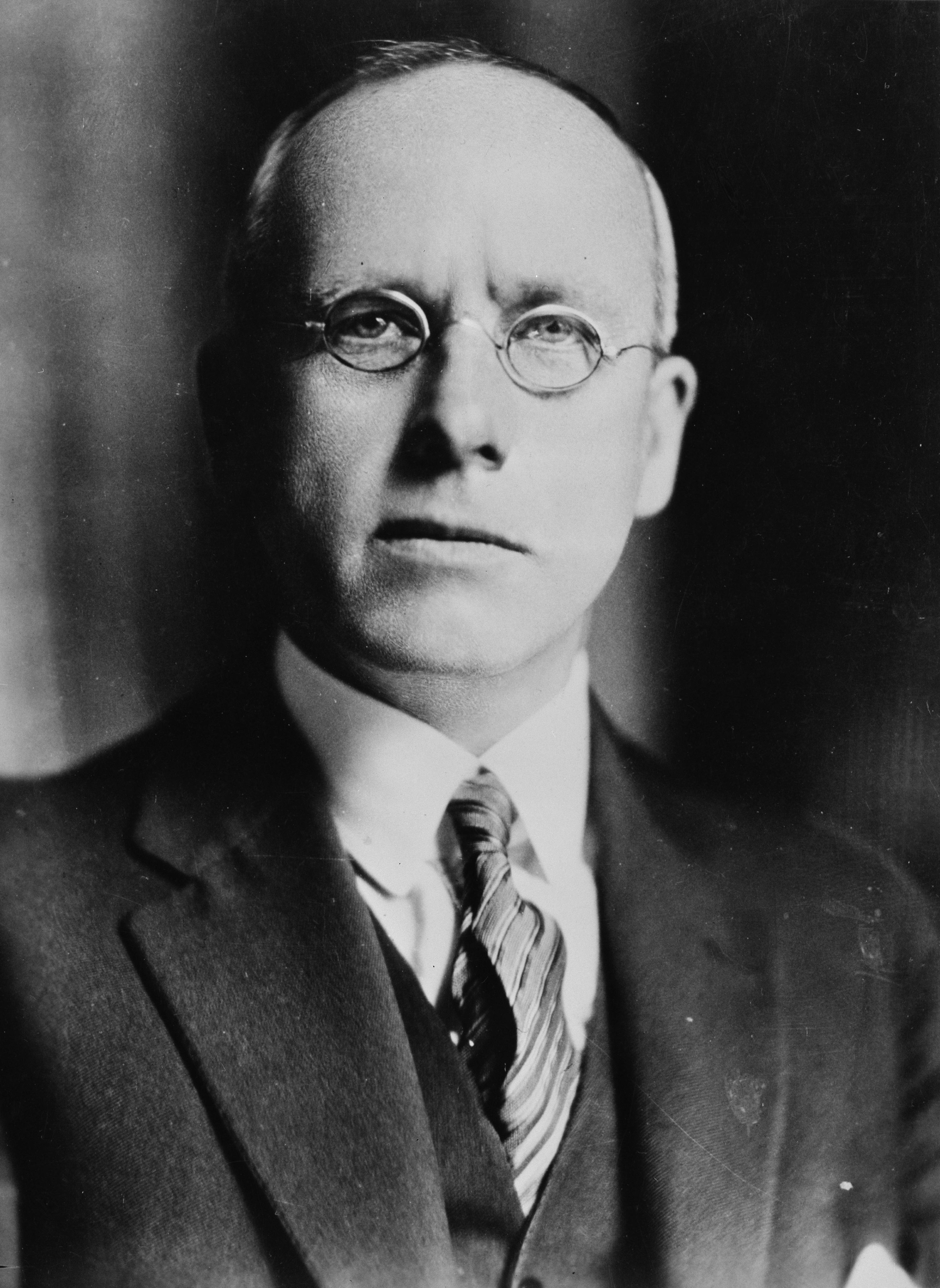

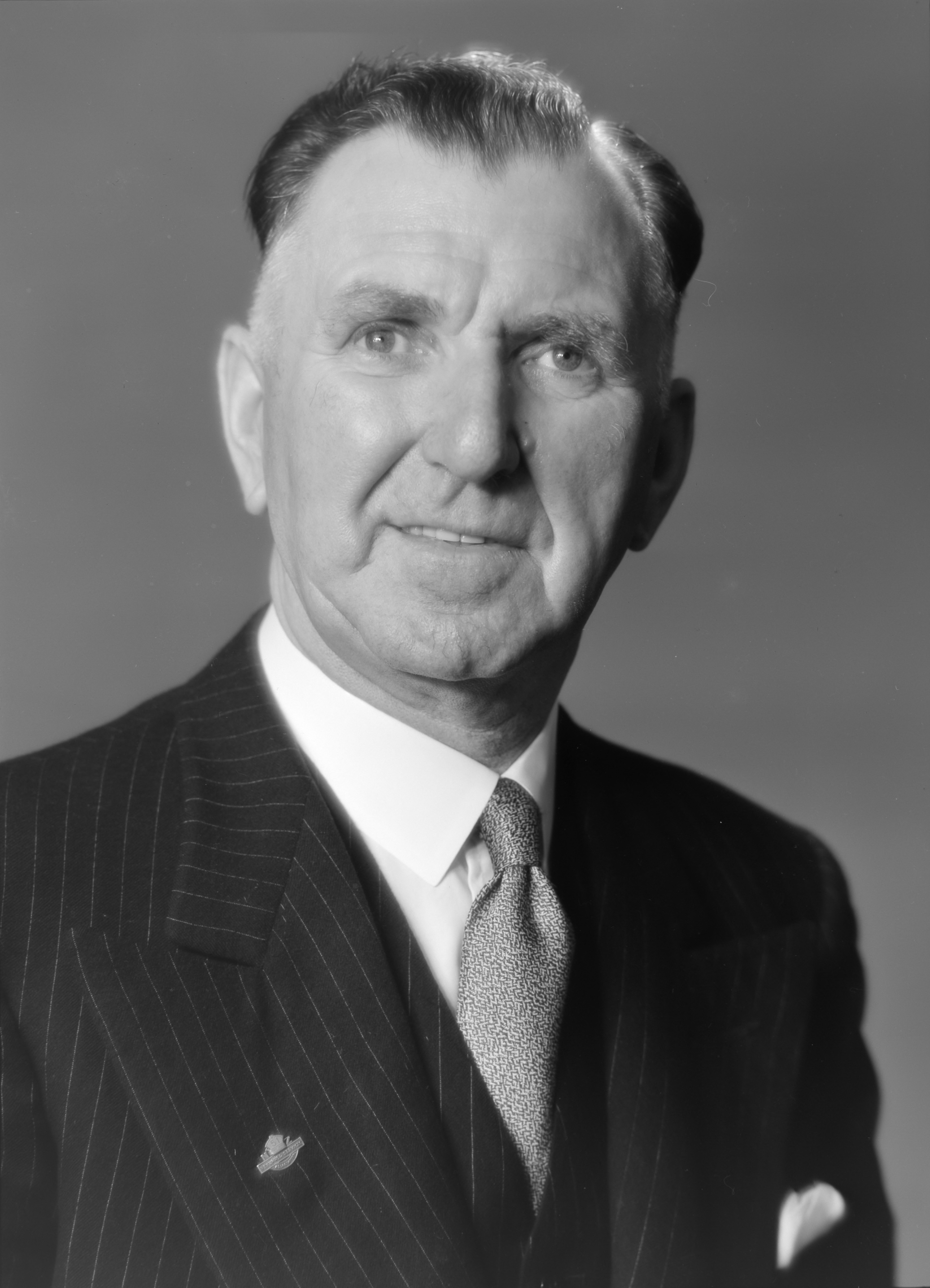
	First party	Second party
Leader	Peter Fraser	Sidney Holland
Party	Labour	National
Leader since	4 April 1940	26 November 1940
Leader's seat	Brooklyn	Christchurch North
Last election	45 seats, 47.6%	34 seats, 42.8%
Seats won	42	38
Seat change	▼3	▲4
Popular vote	536,994	507,139
Percentage	51.3%	48.4%
Swing	▲3.7%	▲5.6%
- Results of the election.
Prime Minister before election
Peter Fraser
Labour
Subsequent Prime Minister
Peter Fraser
Labour

The 1946 New Zealand general election was a nationwide vote to determine the shape of the New Zealand Parliament's 28th term. It saw the governing Labour Party re-elected, but by a substantially narrower margin than in the three previous elections. The National Party continued its gradual rise.

== Background ==
The Labour Party had been in government since winning the 1935 elections, and had been re-elected twice. However, the National Party had managed to overcome the internal problems which had once troubled it, and now presented a credible threat to Labour. National's leader, Sidney Holland, was proving more effective than his predecessor, while the Prime Minister, Peter Fraser, was weary and in poor health. The after-effects of World War II, including ongoing shortages, were affecting the government's popularity.

The next New Zealand census was scheduled for 1946, but having had to postpone the 1941 census due to WWII, the government brought it forward. The 1945 census was held on Tuesday, 25 September, so that the results could be used for the 1946 electoral redistribution prior to the planned 1946 election. In August 1945, there was a first hint that the government considered abolishing the country quota through the Electoral Amendment Act, 1945. The amendment bill was introduced on 18 October 1945 and proposed the complete abolition of the country quota and that electorates be based on adult, as opposed to total, population. The Electoral Amendment Act, 1945 was given royal assent on 12 November and it reduced the number and increased the size of rural electorates. None of the existing electorates remained unchanged, 26 electorates were abolished, 19 electorates were created for the first time, and six former electorates were re-established. The 1946 electoral redistribution had to take ten years of population growth and movements into account. The North Island gained a further two electorates from the South Island due to faster population growth.

=== MPs retiring in 1946 ===
Five Labour MPs and one National MP intended to retire at the end of the Parliament.

Party	Name	Electorate
Labour	Joe Hodgens	Palmerston North
Labour	Leonard Lowry	Otaki
Labour	Peter Neilson	Dunedin Central
Labour	Ben Roberts	Wairarapa
Labour	Paddy Webb	Buller
National	Adam Hamilton	Wallace

== Date of election ==
The election should have been held earlier. The 27th parliament "forgot to mark the calendar, forgot the previous election had been earlier than usual and accidentally ran for two extra months".

== The election ==
The date for the main 1946 elections was 27 November, a Wednesday. Elections to the four Māori electorates were held the day before. 1,081,898 people were registered to vote, and there was a turnout of 93.5%. This turnout was the highest ever recorded at this point. The number of seats being contested was 80, a number which had been fixed since 1902.

== Election results ==
=== Party standings ===
The 1946 election saw the governing Labour Party retain office by a four-seat margin, winning forty-two seats to the National Party's thirty-eight. In the popular vote — Labour won 51.3% and National won 48.4%. The election was a straight fight between the two main parties (unlike the 1943 election), and only 8 of the 76 European electorates had more than two candidates. The Democratic Labour Party did not take part, and National absorbed many of the miscellaneous candidates and splinter movements. The European electorates divided equally and the Maori seats decided the issue.

No other parties won any significant share of the vote, and no independents were elected — only 0.3% of voters did not support one of the two major parties. After Harry Atmore of Nelson died, no candidate who was not from the two main parties managed to enter Parliament until the 1966 elections, when the Social Credit Party won its first seat.

Election results
Party	Candidates	Total votes	Percentage	Seats won	Change
Labour	80	536,994	51.28	42	-3
National	80	507,149	48.43	38	+4
Communist	3	1,181	0.11	0	±0
Independent	9	2,886	0.18	0	-1
Total	172	1,047,210		80	

=== Votes summary ===
Popular Vote
Labour	51.28%
National	48.43%
Others	0.29%

Parliament seats
Labour	52.50%
National	47.50%

=== Initial MPs ===
The table below shows the results of the 1946 general election:

Key

Labour National Independent

Electorate results for the 1946 New Zealand general election
Electorate	Incumbent	Winner	Majority	Runner up
General electorates
Arch Hill	New electorate	Bill Parry	6,585	Edward James Clark
Ashburton	New electorate	Geoff Gerard	1,453	Mabel Newlands
Auckland Central	Bill Parry	Bill Anderton	3,478	Leon Götz
Avon	Dan Sullivan		5,180	Robert Alexander McDowell
Awarua	George Richard Herron		2,588	Gilbert Gregory Mitchell
Bay of Plenty	Bill Sullivan		1,634	Ray Boord
Brooklyn	New electorate	Peter Fraser	3,935	Stewart Hardy
Buller	Paddy Webb	Jerry Skinner	2,912	Phil McDonald
Central Otago	William Bodkin		2,909	Claude Charles Capell
Christchurch Central	New electorate	Robert Macfarlane	4,420	Alan J. Wills
Clutha	James Roy		2,140	John Patrick Thompson
Dunedin Central	Peter Neilson	Phil Connolly	2,000	Stuart Sidey
Dunedin North	Robert Walls		1,630	Norman Jones
Eden	Bill Anderton	Wilfred Fortune	1,281	Warren Freer
Egmont	Ernest Corbett		3,398	Clarence Robert Parker
Fendalton	New electorate	Sidney Holland	3,004	Alan Williams
Franklin	Jack Massey		4,023	Alex Gunn
Gisborne	David Coleman		2,015	Harry Barker
Grey Lynn	Fred Hackett		5,910	Harold Stapleton Barry
Hamilton	Hilda Ross		327	Jack Granville
Hastings	New electorate	Ted Cullen	483	Eric Pryor
Hauraki	Andy Sutherland		2,891	John William Neate
Hawke's Bay	Ted Cullen	Cyril Harker	2,014	Henry Edward Beattie
Hobson	New electorate	Sidney Walter Smith	3,580	Hubert Knox Hatrick
Hurunui	William Gillespie		1,440	John Mathison
Hutt	Walter Nash		2,587	Jim Vogel
Invercargill	William Denham	Ralph Hanan	224	William Denham
Island Bay	New electorate	Robert McKeen	3,958	Herbert Edward Childs
Karori	New electorate	Charles Bowden	2,042	Patrick McGavin
Lyttelton	Terry McCombs		1,543	Ted Taylor
Manawatu	Matthew Oram		2,467	Phil Holloway
Marlborough	Ted Meachen	Tom Shand	179	Ted Meachen
Marsden	Alfred Murdoch		2,149	John Stewart
Miramar	New electorate	Bob Semple	2,482	Len Jacobsen
Mornington	New electorate	Wally Hudson	4,681	Lewis Donald McIver
Mount Albert	New electorate	Arthur Shapton Richards	1,857	Frederick Ashley Hosking
Mount Victoria	New electorate	Jack Marshall	911	Eugene Casey
Napier	Tommy Armstrong		1,845	Alan John Price
Nelson	vacant (Note: Harry Atmore, the previous holder of the Nelson electorate, died on 20 August 1946)	Edgar Neale	585	Cyril Harold Goodman
New Plymouth	Ernest Aderman		405	George Nimmo
North Shore	New electorate	Martyn Finlay	249	Henry Thorne Morton
Oamaru	Arnold Nordmeyer		232	Thomas Ross Beatty
Onehunga	Arthur Osborne		3,424	William Kenneth King
Onslow	New electorate	Harry Combs	1,578	Philip Patrick Lynch
Otahuhu	Charles Robert Petrie		220	Albert Murdoch
Otaki	Leonard Lowry	Jimmy Maher	44	Jim Thorn
Pahiatua	Keith Holyoake		3,697	Otto Ernest Niederer
Palmerston North	Joe Hodgens	Ormond Wilson	928	Gus Mansford
Parnell	New electorate	Duncan Rae	206	Bill Schramm
Patea	William Sheat		870	Richard John O'Dea
Petone	New electorate	Mick Moohan	4,019	George London
Piako	New electorate	Stan Goosman	5,101	Ben Waters
Ponsonby	New electorate	Ritchie Macdonald	3,431	Peter E Dempsey
Raglan	Hallyburton Johnstone	Alan Baxter	13	Hallyburton Johnstone
Rangitikei	Edward Gordon		2,307	John Capstick
Remuera	Ronald Algie		4,410	James Freeman
Riccarton	Jack Watts	Angus McLagan	3,875	Vic Wilson
Rodney	New electorate	Clifton Webb	2,850	Alex Dixon
Roskill	Arthur Shapton Richards	Frank Langstone	155	Roy McElroy
St Albans	New electorate	Jack Watts	86	Morgan Williams
St Kilda	New electorate	Fred Jones	1,248	Leonard James Ireland
Selwyn	New electorate	John McAlpine	472	Alan Sharp
Sydenham	New electorate	Mabel Howard	6,746	Ruric Hunter
Tamaki	New electorate	Tom Skinner	231	John George Concanon Wales
Tauranga	Frederick Doidge		2,704	Dudley A. Hill
Timaru	Clyde Carr		520	Jack Acland
Waikato	Stan Goosman	Geoffrey Sim	4,385	John Dwyer
Waimarino	Frank Langstone	Paddy Kearins	681	Norman Robert Hill
Waimate	New electorate	David Campbell Kidd	789	William Roy Davison
Wairarapa	Ben Roberts	Garnet Mackley	235	George Anders Hansen
Waitakere	New electorate	Rex Mason	2,797	Archibald Morrison Laing
Waitomo	Walter Broadfoot		3,951	Alan George Goldsmith
Wallace	Adam Hamilton	Tom Macdonald	3,716	David Munro
Wanganui	Joe Cotterill		1,934	Eric Merewether
Wellington Central	Peter Fraser	Charles Chapman	1,680	Agnes Weston (Note: Claude Weston died suddenly on 10 November 1946 and was replaced by his wife)
Westland	James O'Brien		4,716	Frank Chivers
Māori electorates
Eastern Maori	Tiaki Omana		1,517	Āpirana Ngata
Northern Maori	Tapihana Paraire Paikea		2,555	James Henare
Southern Maori	Eruera Tirikatene		581	Vernon Ohaia Mason Thomas
Western Maori	Matiu Ratana		6,491	Hoeroa Marumaru

Table footnotes:
