= Catherine Stewart =

New Zealand politician

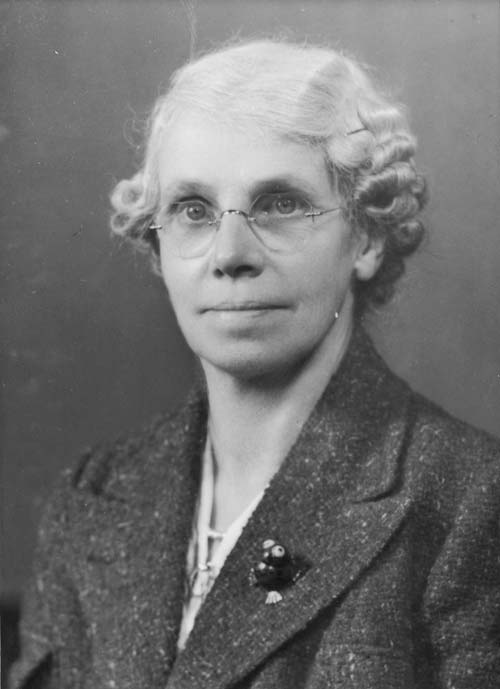

Member of the New Zealand Parliament for Wellington West
- In office 15 October 1938 – 25 September 1943
- Preceded by: Constituency created
- Succeeded by: Charles Bowden

Personal details
- Born: Catherine Campbell Sword; 15 August 1881 Glasgow, Scotland
- Died: 2 April 1957 (aged 75) Glasgow, Scotland
- Party: Labour
- Spouse: Charles Stewart (m. 1900; died 1948)
- Children: 3

Catherine Campbell Stewart (née Sword, 15 August 1881 – 2 April 1957) was a New Zealand politician of the Labour Party.

== Early life ==
Born in Glasgow, she migrated with her family to New Zealand in 1921. She was an ardent suffragette, and a member of the Theosophical Society. At Labour's 1938 conference Stewart stated "I am not speaking as a feminist but as a woman who wishes to stand shoulder to shoulder with our men" in her acceptance to stand as a party candidate.

== Political career ==
New Zealand Parliament
Years	Term	Electorate	Party
1938–1943	26th	Wellington West	Labour

She won the Wellington West electorate in the 1938 election, when she defeated long-standing MP Robert Wright. She was the second woman to be elected to Parliament after Elizabeth McCombs and first to enter parliament as a result of a general election. Stewart saw herself as the "Member for Everywoman" and felt obliged to concentrate on issues in the interests of women, children and those in need. In 1941, she was joined by Mary Dreaver, also of the Labour party, bringing the total of female MPs to two.

Stewart was defeated in the next election held in 1943. This was seen as a result of public vilification due to two of her sons, who were conscientious objectors during World War II. Later she was unsuccessfully nominated for a position on the New Zealand Legislative Council by Labour’s Karori branch in her old electorate.

In both 1941 and 1944 she unsuccessfully stood for the Wellington City Council on a Labour Party ticket. Both elections saw all Labour candidates defeated.

After the death of her husband Charles in 1948, she returned to live in Glasgow, where she died on 2 April 1957.

New Zealand Parliament
New constituency	Member of Parliament for Wellington West; 1938–1943	Succeeded by Charles Bowden
