= New Zealand Railways Corporation =

New Zealand state-owned enterprise

- New Zealand Railways Corporation logo, 1982–1990
- Type: Statutory corporation (1982–1986); State-owned enterprise (1986–present)
- Predecessor: New Zealand Railways Department
- Founded: 1 April 1982
- Headquarters: Wellington, New Zealand
- Area served: New Zealand
- Key people: David McLean, Chairman
- Services: Land ownership
- Revenue: $68,000 (FY2019)
- Website: www.treasury.govt.nz/information-and-services/commercial-portfolio-and-advice/commercial-portfolio/new-zealand-railways-corporation

New Zealand Railways Corporation (NZRC) is the state-owned enterprise that owns the land beneath KiwiRail's railway network on behalf of the Crown. The corporation has existed under a number of guises since 1982, when the old New Zealand Railways Department was corporatised followed by deregulation of the land transport sector. In 1986, the Corporation became a state-owned enterprise, required to make a profit. Huge job losses and cutbacks ensued, and the rail network, rail operations and ferry service of the corporation were transferred to New Zealand Rail Limited in 1990. The Corporation retained ownership of the land beneath the railway network, and charged a nominal rental to New Zealand Rail, which was privatised in 1993, and renamed Tranz Rail in 1995. In 2004, following a deal with Tranz Rail's new owners Toll NZ, the Corporation took over responsibility for maintaining and upgrading the rail network once more, trading under the name ONTRACK. Negotiations with Toll over track access charges concluded after four years with no agreement reached, so the government purchased the entire rail and ferry operations, naming the service KiwiRail. ONTRACK's railway infrastructure and employees were then transferred to KiwiRail in 2008, which itself was initially a subsidiary of the corporation. On 31 December 2012, the Corporation once again became the landowner.

== History ==
The NZRC was created as a statutory corporation by the New Zealand Railways Corporation Act 1981 from the New Zealand Railways Department. It took over the operations of the department from 1 April 1982. Since then, NZRC's role has changed with various governments' policies.

=== Creation ===
New Zealand Railways Corporation logo, 1981–1990

Like the Railways Department that preceded it, the corporation had a responsible Minister, the Minister of Railways. Along with rail operations, the Corporation inherited New Zealand Railways Road Services bus, truck and parcels services and SeaRail interisland ferries.

During the 1980s NZRC faced many business challenges, such as the growth of competition from road freight operators following the deregulation of the land transport industry from 1983 by the repeal of the Transport Licensing Act 1931. The corporation's revenues were halved by the new competition.

=== Booz Allen Hamilton report ===
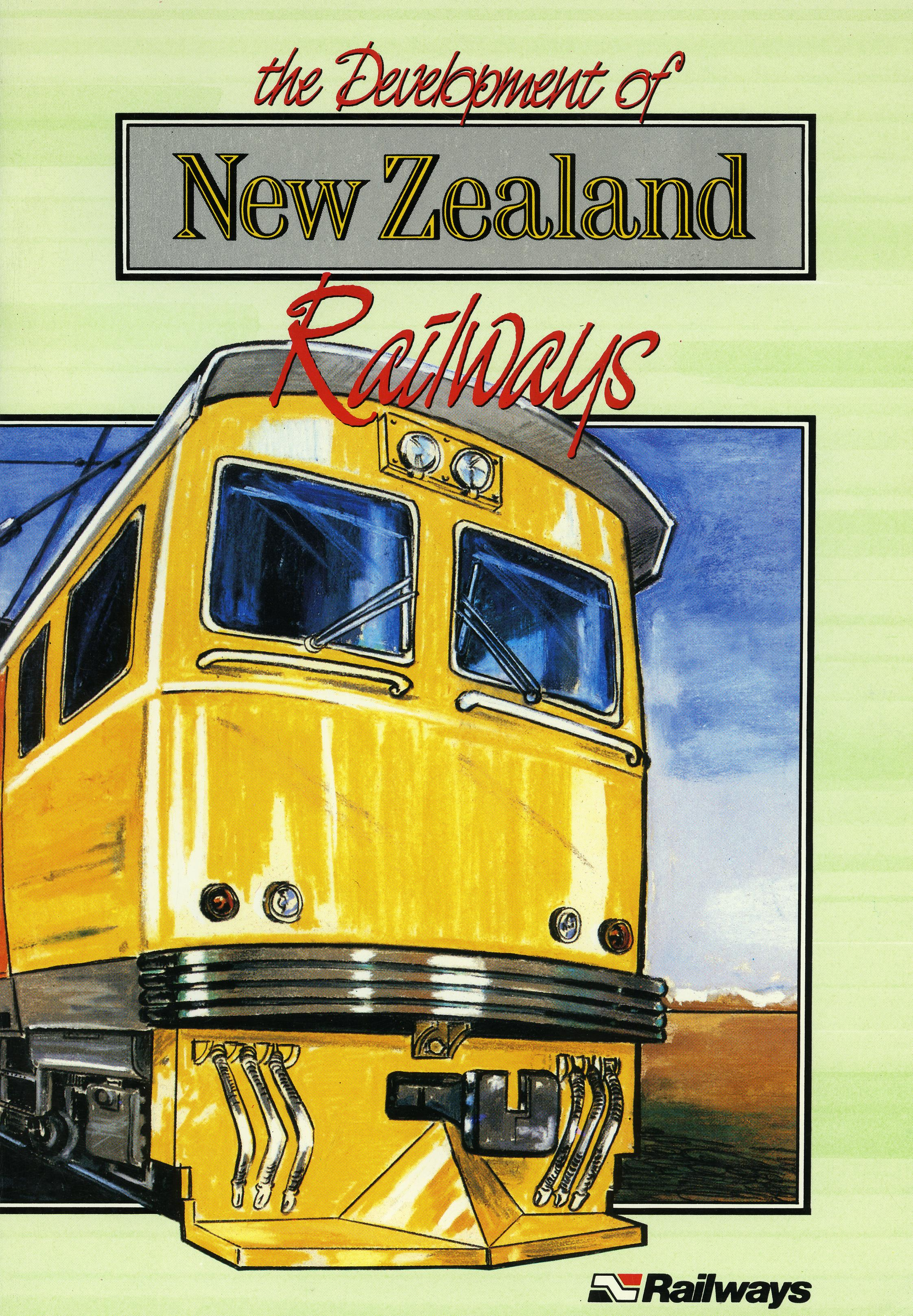
The electrification of the central section of the North Island Main Trunk was completed in 1988.

In April 1983 the Corporation engaged international consultants Booz Allen Hamilton to review the effectiveness and efficiency of the corporation's operations.

In May 1984 they consultants reported back to the Muldoon National government. The report identified three major events that had critically influenced the corporation:

- The 1978 lifting of the road transport regulations to allow goods to be transported up to 150 km, causing freight volumes to drop 18% by 1983;
- The creation of the Corporation in 1982;
- The full deregulation of land transport in 1983;

The report recommended, amongst other things:

- Reducing staff numbers;
- Re-orienting freight services towards bulk commodities;
- Increasing the length and weight of freight trains;
- Rationalising the locomotive and wagon fleet;
- Rationalising railway workshops; and
- Re-focusing long-distance passenger services towards tourists.

This prompted the then opposition New Zealand Labour Party to launch a campaign called "Save Rail". Despite this, rationalisation of the NZRC began with the election of the Fourth Labour government in July 1984. In 1985 NZRC began a major corporate restructuring program, transforming the old functionally based branch structure into three core business groups:

- Railfreight (later Railfreight Systems), combining rail and road freight and including all rail engineering functions;
- the Passenger Business Group, consisting of New Zealand Railways Road Services passenger and parcels operations, later branded Cityline for suburban trains and buses, InterCity for long-distance trains and buses, and Speedlink for rail and road parcels; and
- SeaRail, the rail and road ferry service between the North and South Islands.

In 1986, the Corporation became a state-owned enterprise under the State-Owned Enterprises Act 1986. Staff cuts were drastic and infrastructure was reduced or closed. The Corporation closed a number of unprofitable branch lines, including:

- Opua Branch (1985)
- Okaihau Branch (1987)
- Makareao Branch (1989)
- Middlemarch—Clyde section of the Otago Central Branch (1990)
- Thames Branch (1991, no services since 1985)

Older and smaller classes of locomotives were withdrawn and scrapped, including the DE class, DI class, DJ class, DB class, and the DA class. Workshops at Addington (Christchurch), East Town (Wanganui) and Otahuhu (Auckland) were closed.

Guards vans (aka Brake vans) were withdrawn from the rear of all freight trains on 30 May 1987, and were replaced with Flashing rear-end devices (known as FREDs).

By 1989 large operating losses and interest had generated a debt of $1.2 billion.

=== Break up and asset sales ===
The Fourth Labour Government passed the New Zealand Railways Corporation Restructuring Act 1990 on 28 August of that year. New Zealand Rail Limited (NZRL) was established as a Crown Transferee Company under the provisions of the Act, and took over NZRC's rail transport and shipping activities, including the railway tracks, on 28 October 1990. NZRL leased the railway corridor from NZRC for $1 per year. Branding initially remained unchanged, except that suburban passenger trains were rebranded Cityrail.

Non-core assets remained with NZRC prior to their disposal. Many of these assets were written down by the Government, for $830 million. Speedlink Parcels was sold to New Zealand Post, and InterCity bus services were sold in 1991 to InterCity Group, a group of four of the country's largest private coach companies – Ritchies Coachlines, Tranzit, PTL Route Services and Nelson SBL. Railway stations in Auckland, Rotorua, Christchurch, Dunedin, Napier and Oamaru were sold, along with substantial tracts of land previously used for rail operations. Cityline bus services were sold to various purchasers. Railway Houses for staff accommodation were sold, starting from 1989.

=== National rail landowner ===
Ownership of the railway corridor underneath the tracks remained with NZRC, which managed the lease of the land to New Zealand Rail Limited. NZRC was also tasked with disposing of the remaining surplus railway land, some buildings and the remaining railway houses. The remainder was then transferred to Land Information New Zealand on 1 January 1994. Following privatisation of New Zealand Rail Limited in 1993, the company was renamed Tranz Rail in 1995, until acquired by Toll Holdings in 2004. A separate deal transferred ownership of the Auckland metropolitan rail network from Tranz Rail to the Government in 2001. As part of Toll's acquisition of Tranz Rail, the Government re-acquired the rail track infrastructure from Toll and signed the National Rail Access Agreement.

=== Renationalisation of rail infrastructure ===
For the first time since 1990, the New Zealand Railways Corporation owned the entire New Zealand railway network, acquired from Toll for $1. The National Rail Access Agreement provided:

- Toll Rail (the new name for Tranz Rail) would have exclusive access rights to use the rail network for 66 years;
- Toll Rail would pay ONTRACK access fees in exchange for exclusive access;
- The Government would commit to a "significant capital investment" programme;
- This would be subject to a "use it or lose it" clause – if Toll Rail fell below average annual freight or passenger volumes for more than three years consecutively, the Government could appoint a new operator for a particular line or the entire network.

In the first year of the agreement (2004–05), Toll Rail paid $38M in track access charges. For the subsequent periods the track access charges were to be renegotiated, along with the commitment by the Government and Toll to further investment in the rail network.

=== Network provider ===
From 1 July 2004 NZRC assumed the Crown's responsibilities under the National Rail Access Agreement and adopted the trading name ONTRACK. ONTRACK began Project DART, a major $600 million upgrade of Auckland's suburban railway network, and the Wellington Regional Rail Program (WRRP) to upgrade parts of Wellington's suburban network. These upgrades, along with other projects around the country, followed years of under-investment in the rail infrastructure.

==== Track access negotiations ====
ONTRACK and Toll NZ were in dispute about track access fees from mid-2006 and an independent arbitrator, Bill Wilson QC, was called in to resolve the issues. Separate talks continued between Toll and the Government on long-term access arrangements. On 31 January 2007 Toll stated that "...the discussions with the Crown on a long term sustainable access regime have generally been positive", but "Toll NZ is still concerned that the Crown appears to be unwilling to recognise the inequality of the funding support between road and rail and the need to adopt a more commercial approach to track access management".

=== Renationalisation of rail operations ===
The Labour Government announced in May 2008 that the rail and sea operations of Toll NZ Limited, less its trucking and distribution operations, was to be purchased for NZ$665 million. The purchase was completed on 1 July 2008 and the company renamed KiwiRail. It planned to spend an estimated NZ$1 billion over five years to develop a modern effective rail system. Most of this expense is in purchasing new locomotives to replace aging rolling stock.

=== KiwiRail ===
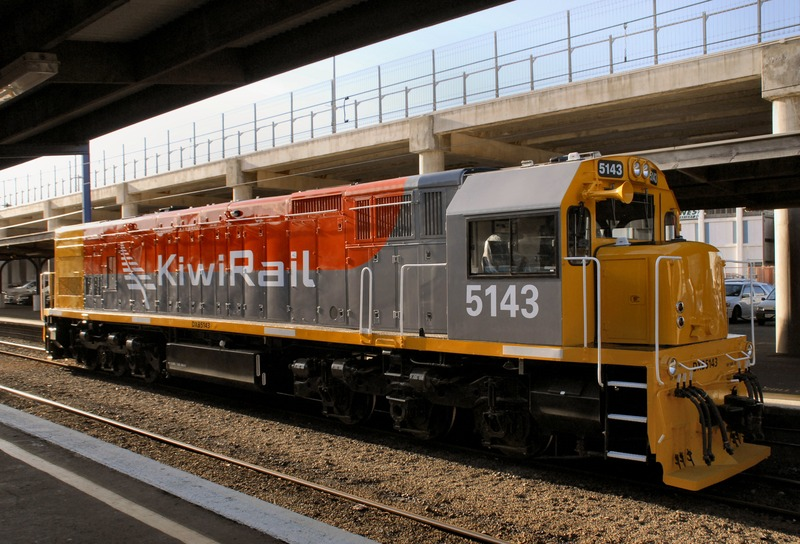
DXB5143, the first locomotive to be painted in the KiwiRail livery, stands at Wellington railway station Platform 9 on 1 July 2008.

Initially, KiwiRail and ONTRACK were both separate companies owned by NZRC. On 1 October 2008 KiwiRail became a direct subsidiary of NZRC, and ONTRACK was merged into KiwiRail. The ONTRACK brand continuing to be used by KiwiRail's infrastructure arm. In 2011 the ONTRACK brand was dropped and renamed KiwiRail Infrastructure, a division of KiwiRail (although ONTRACK Infrastructure Limited continued to be directly owned by NZRC).

=== De-merger ===
On 31 October 2011, KiwiRail proposed splitting its land and rail corridor assets from its rail operation assets. On 27 June 2012 it was announced by the company that the value of the land and rail operations will be written down from NZ$7.8 billion to $1.1 to $1.3 billion, and KiwiRail will continue as the rail and ferry operator, while the New Zealand Railways Corporation will manage KiwiRail's land. Minister of Finance Bill English and Minister of State Owned Enterprises Tony Ryall said the New Zealand Railways Corporation will continue to hold the 18,000 ha of railway land, "from which no financial return will be expected." The arrangement is similar to that which existed between New Zealand Rail Limited and the New Zealand Railways Corporation in the 1990s, although KiwiRail provides all "management services" under an agreement to the corporation.

Today, the corporation has assets comprising the railway corridor land, valued at $3.8 billion. Wellington railway station and Social Hall buildings were transferred to KiwiRail in January 2017.

== Performance ==
From its inception in 1982 coinciding with land transport deregulation, the Railways Corporation struggled to retain market share, and its performance in terms of freight tonnage carried reflected this (figures are in thousands (000s)):

Year	Tonnes (000s)	Net tonne-km (millions)
1983	11,100	3,164
1984	10,600	3,165.5
1985	10,400	3,192
1986	9,600	3,043
1987	9,000	2,912
1988	8,900	2,924

== See also ==
- Rail transport in New Zealand
- List of Chief Executives of New Zealand Railways

Preceded by New Zealand Railways Department	New Zealand railway land owner 1981–	Succeeded by Incumbent
Preceded by New Zealand Railways Department	New Zealand rail owner and operator 1981–1991	Succeeded by New Zealand Rail Ltd
Preceded by Tranz Rail	New Zealand rail infrastructure owner and maintainer 2004–2012	Succeeded by KiwiRail
Preceded by Toll NZ	New Zealand rail service owner and operator 2008–2012	Succeeded by KiwiRail
