= Jack Marshall =

Prime Minister of New Zealand in 1972

The Right Honourable Sir Jack Marshall GBE CH ED
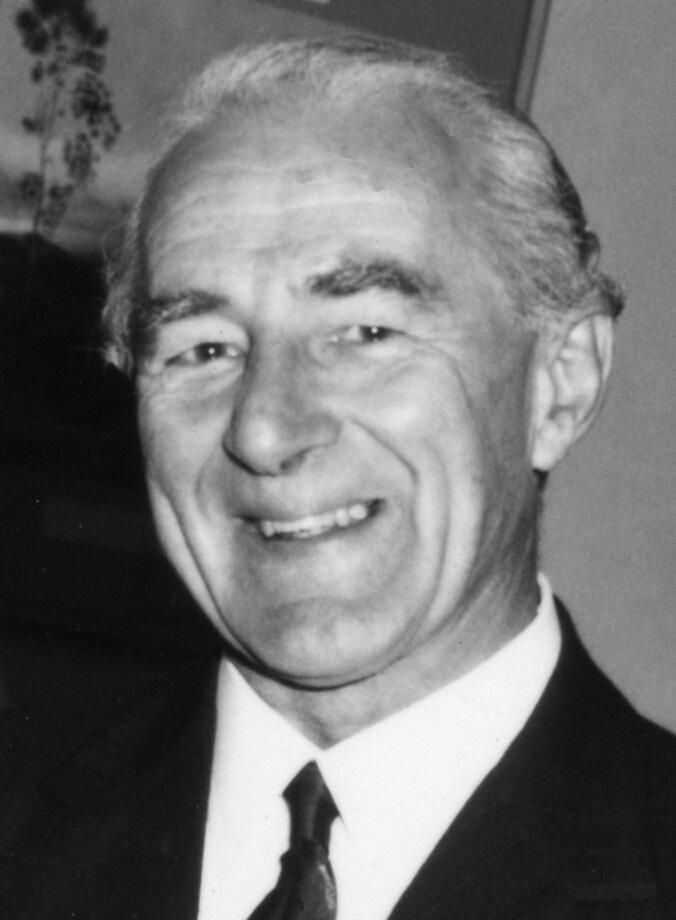
- Marshall in 1972

28th Prime Minister of New Zealand
- In office 7 February 1972 – 8 December 1972
- Monarch: Elizabeth II
- Governors-General: The Lord Porritt; Sir Denis Blundell
- Deputy: Robert Muldoon
- Preceded by: Keith Holyoake
- Succeeded by: Norman Kirk

4th Leader of the National Party
- In office 7 February 1972 – 9 July 1974
- Deputy: Robert Muldoon
- Preceded by: Keith Holyoake
- Succeeded by: Robert Muldoon

1st Minister of Overseas Trade
- In office 12 December 1960 – 9 February 1972
- Prime Minister: Keith Holyoake
- Succeeded by: Brian Talboys

2nd Deputy Prime Minister of New Zealand
- In office 12 December 1960 – 7 February 1972
- Prime Minister: Keith Holyoake
- Preceded by: Jerry Skinner
- Succeeded by: Robert Muldoon
- In office 20 September 1957 – 12 December 1957
- Prime Minister: Keith Holyoake
- Preceded by: Keith Holyoake
- Succeeded by: Jerry Skinner

32nd Minister of Justice
- In office 26 November 1954 – 12 December 1957
- Prime Minister: Sidney Holland; Keith Holyoake
- Preceded by: Clifton Webb
- Succeeded by: Rex Mason

16th Minister of Health
- In office 19 September 1951 – 26 November 1954
- Prime Minister: Sidney Holland
- Preceded by: Jack Watts
- Succeeded by: Ralph Hanan

7th Minister of Statistics
- In office 13 December 1949 – 19 September 1951
- Prime Minister: Sidney Holland
- Preceded by: Walter Nash
- Succeeded by: Jack Watts

Member of the New Zealand Parliament for Karori Mount Victoria (1946–1954)
- In office 27 November 1946 – 29 November 1975
- Preceded by: Electorate established
- Succeeded by: Hugh Templeton

Personal details
- Born: John Ross Marshall; 5 March 1912 Wellington, New Zealand
- Died: 30 August 1988 (aged 76) Snape, Suffolk, England
- Party: National
- Spouse: Jessie Margaret Livingston (m. 1944)
- Children: 4
- Education: Victoria University of Wellington
- Occupation: Lawyer

Military service
- Allegiance: New Zealand
- Branch/service: New Zealand Military Forces
- Years of service: 1941–1945
- Rank: Lieutenant Colonel
- Unit: 36th Battalion; Divisional Cavalry Battalion
- Battles/wars: World War II; Solomon Islands campaign; Italian campaign

Sir John Ross Marshall GBE CH ED PC (5 March 1912 – 30 August 1988) was a New Zealand politician of the National Party. He entered Parliament in 1946 and was first promoted to Cabinet in 1951. After spending eleven years as the deputy prime minister of New Zealand, he served as the 28th prime minister from February until December 1972.

The Second National Government, in office since 1960, appeared worn-out and out of touch, and at the time of Marshall's appointment it seemed headed for heavy electoral defeat. After Labour's victory in the 1972 general election, Marshall became Leader of the Opposition. He was determined to remain as leader of the National Party, but in July 1974 was challenged for the leadership by Robert Muldoon, his deputy, rival and successor.

Marshall's politeness and courtesy were well known, and he was sometimes nicknamed Gentleman Jack. He disliked the aggressive style of some politicians, preferring a calmer, less confrontational approach. These traits were sometimes misinterpreted as weakness by his opponents. Marshall was a strong believer in pragmatism, and he disliked what he considered populism in other politicians of his day. At his death he was described as "A soft spoken lawyer almost too nice to be a politician".

== Early life ==
Marshall was born in Wellington. He grew up in Wellington, Whangārei, and Dunedin, attending Whangarei Boys' High School and Otago Boys' High School. He was noted for his ability at sports, particularly rugby.

After leaving high school, Marshall studied law at Victoria University College. He gained an LL.B. in 1934 and an LL.M. in 1935. He also worked part-time in a law office. He was deeply involved with the Presbyterian Church, also serving for a time as president of the New Zealand Bible Society.

In 1941, during World War II, Marshall joined the New Zealand Military Forces, and received officer training. In his first few years of service, he was posted to 36th Battalion and served in Fiji, Norfolk Island, New Caledonia, and the Solomon Islands, eventually reaching the rank of major. During this time he also spent five months in the United States at a marine staff school in Virginia. On 29 July 1944, while on leave in Perth, Western Australia, Marshall married Jessie Margaret Livingston, a nurse. At the start of 1945, Marshall was transferred to the Divisional Cavalry Battalion in Italy and participated in the battle of the Senio River and the liberation of Trieste.

== Member of Parliament ==
New Zealand Parliament
Years	Term	Electorate	Party
1946–1949	28th	Mount Victoria	National
1949–1951	29th	Mount Victoria	National
1951–1954	30th	Mount Victoria	National
1954–1957	31st	Karori	National
1957–1960	32nd	Karori	National
1960–1963	33rd	Karori	National
1963–1966	34th	Karori	National
1966–1969	35th	Karori	National
1969–1972	36th	Karori	National
1972–1975	37th	Karori	National

After the war, Marshall briefly established himself as a barrister, but was soon persuaded to stand as the National Party's candidate for the new Wellington seat of Mt Victoria in the 1946 election. He won the seat by 911 votes. He was, however, nearly disqualified by a technicality – Marshall was employed at the time in a legal case for the government, something which ran afoul of rules barring politicians from giving business to their own firms. However, because Marshall had taken on the case before his election (and so could not have influenced the government's decision to give him employment), it was obvious that there had been no wrongdoing. As such, the prime minister, Peter Fraser of the Labour Party, amended the regulations.

Marshall's political philosophy, which was well-defined at this stage, was a mixture of liberal and conservative values. He was opposed to laissez-faire capitalism, but was equally opposed to the redistribution of wealth advocated by socialists – his vision was of a property-owning society under the benign guidance of a fair and just government. Barry Gustafson states, "[Marshall] was strongly motivated by his Christian faith and by an equally deep intellectual commitment to the principles of liberalism."

=== Cabinet Minister ===
In the 1949 election, Marshall kept his seat. The National Party gained enough seats to form a government, and Sidney Holland became prime minister. Marshall was elevated to Cabinet, taking the role of Minister of Statistics and also having ministerial responsibility for the State Advances Corporation. He also became a direct assistant to Holland.

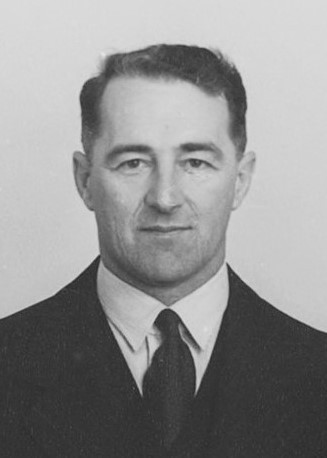
Marshall as a Cabinet minister in 1951

After the 1951 election, Marshall became Minister of Health (although he also retained responsibility for State Advances until 1953). In the 1954 election, his Mt Victoria seat was abolished, and he successfully stood for another Wellington electorate, Karori. After the election, he lost the Health portfolio, instead becoming Minister of Justice and Attorney-General. In these roles, he supported the retention of the capital punishment for murder. In 1957, he proposed a referendum on capital punishment. (New Zealand's last execution was carried out in 1957, during Marshall's time in office.) He also supported the creation of a separate Court of Appeal.

When Holland became ill, Marshall was part of the group that persuaded him to step down. Keith Holyoake became prime minister. Marshall sought the deputy leadership, managing to defeat Jack Watts for this post. The result was kept secret from the caucus and several cabinet ministers privately speculated that Watts had actually won, but Holyoake overturned the result, concerned with Watts' health.

=== Deputy Prime Minister ===
Shortly after the leadership change, National lost the 1957 election to Labour's Walter Nash. Marshall, therefore, became deputy leader of the Opposition. The Nash government did not last long, however – its drastic measures to counter an economic crisis proved unpopular. Marshall was later to admit that the crisis had been prompted by a failure to act by the National government. Labour lost the 1960 election, and National returned to power.

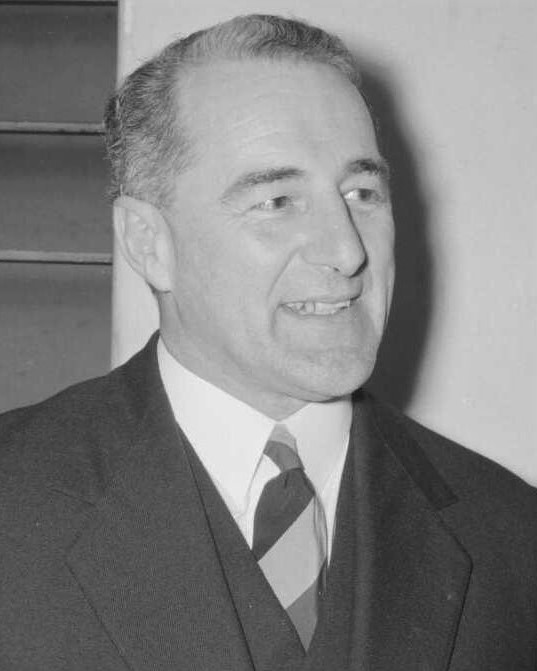
Marshall in 1957

Marshall once more became deputy prime minister, but rather than attorney-general and minister of justice again he was allocated several new positions, including ministerial responsibility for Industries and Commerce, Overseas Trade, Immigration, and Customs. One of his major achievements was the signing of trade arrangements with Australia and the United Kingdom. Marshall also supported the abolition of compulsory union membership, which had been a National Party election policy – when the government eventually decided not to push forward with the change, Marshall's relations with some of his colleagues were strained.

Marshall promoted the retention of capital punishment for murder. However, Labour under Arnold Nordmeyer was opposed, and in 1961 ten National MPs, including Robert Muldoon, crossed the floor and voted with Labour to abolish it.

Increasingly, as time went on, Marshall became overworked, with Holyoake giving him more and more cabinet responsibilities. In the 1960s he led negotiations over trade consequences if Britain joined the European Economic Community (EEC). His polite and genial nature suited him well to diplomatic and trade negotiations. He was most noted for his successful negotiating for continued access to Europe for New Zealand farming exports after Britain had joined the EEC. Marshall was also put under considerable pressure by ongoing labour disputes, which he took a significant role in resolving. Relations between Marshall and Robert Muldoon, the Minister of Finance, grew very tense, with Marshall resenting Muldoon's open interference in the labour negotiations. Marshall was also responsible for establishing the Accident Compensation Corporation.

=== Prime Minister (1972) ===
On 7 February 1972, Holyoake stepped down as prime minister. Marshall contested the leadership against Muldoon, and won. Muldoon became deputy prime minister. Marshall was keen to reorganise the government, believing that it had become stagnated and inflexible. The public were tired of the long-serving National government, and considered the reshuffles insufficient.

During Marshall's brief tenure as prime minister, significant legislation such as the Equal Pay Act 1972 and the Accident Compensation Act 1972 was passed into law.

In the 1972 general election, Norman Kirk's Labour Party was triumphant. On 8 December, after Marshall had been in office for less than a year, Kirk was sworn in as Prime Minister and Marshall became the Leader of the Opposition.

=== Leader of the Opposition ===
Marshall became Leader of the Opposition in 1972. He made the choice to not separate the shadow cabinet from the rest of the caucus to encourage party unity. He made minimal changes to his portfolio allocations from February 1972 to highlight National's experience and stability, contrasting from the comparative inexperience of the new Labour Government.

On 4 July 1974, Marshall was informed that a leadership challenge from his own deputy, Muldoon, was imminent. Aware that much of his support had drained away, Marshall resigned, leaving Muldoon to take the leadership unopposed. Marshall's decline was primarily the result of his inability to damage the highly popular Kirk; Marshall's quiet, understated style did not fit well with the aggressive tactics required of an opposition party seeking to return to government. Ironically, Kirk died on 31 August 1974 and his replacement, Bill Rowling, was perceived as a quiet and non-confrontational leader, just as Marshall had been.

After relinquishing the leadership Marshall remained on the front bench as Shadow Minister of Overseas Trade. He decided to retire from parliament at the 1975 election.

== Later life and death ==
He remained active in the National Party organisation, and was highly respected for his many years of service. Marshall was initially reticent on his successor's activities, though he became publicly more critical of Muldoon's aggressive personality with time. Following the Moyle Affair, he was interviewed on television about the incident; he criticised Muldoon's behavior, of accusing Labour MP Colin Moyle of being picked up by the police for homosexual activities, stating "I think anyone who indulges in this kind of conduct is damaging himself and lowering the status of Parliament". Over time he grew ever more critical of Muldoon, accusing him of being overly aggressive and controlling. Muldoon's highly controversial decision to allow a visit by a rugby union team from apartheid South Africa exasperated Marshall even more. He wrote his memoirs (split into two volumes) which "pulled no punches" in his description of Muldoon and his 1974 leadership coup.

In addition to his memoirs, Marshall wrote a law book and published several children's books about the adventures of a character named 'Dr Duffer'. He had first started writing the stories as a law student in his youth, but did not publish the first book until 1978. They were very popular, with the first book selling out within a week and thousands more being ordered. He was active in various charities and cultural organisations, including the New Zealand Chess Association, and was a founder of the New Zealand Portrait Gallery. Many of his later activities were related to his strong Christian faith. Marshall died in Snape, Suffolk, England, on 30 August 1988, en route to Budapest to give an address at the world conference of the United Bible Societies. He was survived by his wife and four children.

== Honours ==
In 1953, Marshall was awarded the Queen Elizabeth II Coronation Medal, and in 1977 he received the Queen Elizabeth II Silver Jubilee Medal.

In the 1973 New Year Honours, Marshall was appointed a Member of the Order of the Companions of Honour, in recognition of his service as New Zealand prime minister, and the following year he was bestowed with a knighthood as a Knight Grand Cross of the Order of the British Empire.

In the 1992 Queen's Birthday Honours, Margaret, Lady Marshall, was appointed a Companion of the Queen's Service Order for community service.

== Notes ==
Government offices
Preceded by Keith Holyoake	Deputy Prime Minister of New Zealand; 1957 1960–1972	Succeeded by Jerry Skinner
Preceded by Jerry Skinner	Deputy Prime Minister of New Zealand; 1957 1960–1972	Succeeded by Robert Muldoon
Preceded by Keith Holyoake	Prime Minister of New Zealand; 1972	Succeeded by Norman Kirk
Political offices
Preceded by Walter Nash	Minister of Statistics; 1949–1951	Succeeded by Jack Watts
Preceded by Jack Watts	Minister of Health; 1951–1954	Succeeded by Ralph Hanan
Preceded by Clifton Webb	Attorney-General; 1953–1957 1969–1971	Succeeded by Rex Mason
Preceded by Ralph Hanan	Attorney-General; 1953–1957 1969–1971	Succeeded by Dan Riddiford
Preceded by Clifton Webb	Minister of Justice; 1954–1957	Succeeded by Rex Mason
New title	Minister of Overseas Trade; 1960–1972	Succeeded by Brian Talboys
New Zealand Parliament
New constituency	Member of Parliament for Mount Victoria; 1946–1954	Constituency abolished
Preceded by Charles Bowden	Member of Parliament for Karori; 1954–1975	Succeeded by Hugh Templeton
