= Karori (electorate) =

Karori was a New Zealand electorate, situated in the west of Wellington. It existed from 1946 to 1978, and was represented by three different Members of Parliament during that period, all of them are represented by National Party due to being a wealthy suburb.

== Population centres ==
The 1941 New Zealand census had been postponed due to World War II, so the 1946 electoral redistribution had to take ten years of population growth and movements into account. The North Island gained a further two electorates from the South Island due to faster population growth. The abolition of the country quota through the Electoral Amendment Act, 1945 reduced the number and increased the size of rural electorates. None of the existing electorates remained unchanged, 27 electorates were abolished, eight former electorates were re-established, and 19 electorates were created for the first time, including Karori.

The electorate of Karori was created for the 1946 elections. Its initial boundaries were roughly the same as the abolished Wellington West electorate, except that it did not include Brooklyn or Ngaio. It included Karori proper, Northland, Wilton, Mākara, and parts of Kelburn, as follows:

All that area bounded by a line commencing at a point on the high-water mark of Cook Strait at the south-eastern corner of Section 37, Terawhiti District, in Block XIII, Port Nicholson Survey District; thence northerly along the eastern boundaries of Sections 37 and 38, the eastern and northern boundaries of Section 70, and the northern boundary of Section 69, all of Terawhiti District, to the southernmost point of the Wellington Water-supply Reserve ; thence along the eastern boundary of the said reserve to its intersection with the south-western boundary of Section 3, Upper Kaiwarra District; thence along a right line to the south-eastern corner of Section 10, Ohiro District; thence along the south-eastern boundary of the Town Belt to a point in line with the middle of Durham Street; thence to and along the middle of Durham Street, Aro Street, St. John Street, Abel Smith Street, and The Terrace, to Bowen Street; thence along the middle of Bowen Street and Sydney Street West to Tinakori Road; thence south-westerly along the middle of Tinakori Road, to and along the middle of St. Mary Street, Grant Road, and Wadestown Road, to a point in line with the north-eastern boundary of the Town Belt as defined by Pakuao Stream; thence north-westerly generally along the boundary of the Electoral District of Onslow, hereinbefore described, to the westernmost corner of Section 111, Ohariu District, in Block I, Port Nicholson Survey District; thence along the sea-coast to the south-eastern corner of Section 37, Terawhiti District, the point of commencement.

Redistributions for the 1954 elections saw it lose a small amount of territory to Wellington Central electorate, and gain a small amount from Onslow electorate. Redistributions for the 1957 elections saw it again gain territory (parts of Khandallah and Ngaio) from Onslow, but lose territory to Wellington South electorate. For the Redistributions for the 1963 elections, it gained the whole of Khandallah and Johnsonville from the abolished Onslow electorate, but lost Kelburn, Northland, and Wilton. The 1969 elections saw it lose Johnsonville, regain parts of Wilton and Northland, and gain Ohariu. In the 1972 elections, it lost ground in Wilton and Northland, but regained parts of Johnsonville.

The electorate was abolished through the 1977 electoral redistribution, which came into effect with the 1978 election. The new electorate of Ohariu was roughly based on the Karori electorate, but did not include any of Khandallah or Ngaio.

== History ==
The electorate was held by the National Party for the duration of its existence. Its longest occupant, Jack Marshall, briefly served as Prime Minister.

=== Members of Parliament ===
The Karori electorate was represented by three Members of Parliament.

Key

National

Election	Winner
1946 election	Charles Bowden
1949 election	Charles Bowden
1951 election	Charles Bowden
1954 election	Jack Marshall
1957 election	Jack Marshall
1960 election	Jack Marshall
1963 election	Jack Marshall
1966 election	Jack Marshall
1969 election	Jack Marshall
1972 election	Jack Marshall
1975 election	Hugh Templeton
Electorate abolished 1978; see Ohariu

== Election results ==
=== 1975 election ===
1975 general election: Karori
Party	Candidate	Votes	%	±%
National	Hugh Templeton	11,235	56.52	
Labour	Margaret Shields	6,405	32.22	
Values	Bill Emsley	1,379	6.93	
Social Credit	Eric Elliott	829	4.17	
Liberal	Franz Shaw	15	0.07	
Independent	Margaret Gellen	14	0.07	
Majority		4,830	24.29	
Turnout		19,877	83.95	−5.82
Registered electors		23,676		

=== 1972 election ===
1972 general election: Karori
Party	Candidate	Votes	%	±%
National	Jack Marshall	9,825	55.80	−9.85
Labour	Adam Floyd	5,417	30.76	
Values	Brian Dreadon	1,650	9.37	
Social Credit	Ron England	676	3.83	−0.97
New Democratic	George John Ayo	38	0.21	
Majority		4,408	25.03	−11.07
Turnout		17,606	89.77	−0.66
Registered electors		19,611		

=== 1969 election ===
1969 general election: Karori
Party	Candidate	Votes	%	±%
National	Jack Marshall	11,320	65.65	+6.25
Labour	Roy Tombs	5,094	29.55	
Social Credit	Ron England	828	4.80	
Majority		6,226	36.10	+7.54
Turnout		17,242	89.11	+2.23
Registered electors		19,349		

=== 1966 election ===
1966 general election: Karori
Party	Candidate	Votes	%	±%
National	Jack Marshall	10,961	59.40	−0.27
Labour	Peter Blizard	5,691	30.84	
Social Credit	Stuart Dickson	1,798	9.74	
Majority		5,270	28.56	+5.30
Turnout		18,450	86.59	−4.75
Registered electors		21,305		

=== 1963 election ===
1963 general election: Karori
Party	Candidate	Votes	%	±%
National	Jack Marshall	10,312	59.67	−2.32
Labour	Keith Spry	6,292	36.41	
Social Credit	Barney Thomas Daniel	677	3.92	
Majority		4,020	23.26	−3.91
Turnout		17,281	91.34	+3.12
Registered electors		18,919		

=== 1960 election ===
1960 general election: Karori
Party	Candidate	Votes	%	±%
National	Jack Marshall	9,841	61.99	+4.64
Labour	Olive Smuts-Kennedy	5,528	34.83	
Social Credit	Dorothy Wild	505	3.18	
Majority		4,313	27.17	+8.66
Turnout		15,874	88.22	−4.60
Registered electors		17,993		

=== 1957 election ===
1957 general election: Karori
Party	Candidate	Votes	%	±%
National	Jack Marshall	9,481	57.35	+4.05
Labour	Keith Spry	6,420	38.83	
Social Credit	Barney Thomas Daniel	555	3.35	
Independent	Thomas Simpson	75	0.45	
Majority		3,061	18.51	+6.91
Turnout		16,531	92.82	+4.94
Registered electors		17,809		

=== 1954 election ===
1954 general election: Karori
Party	Candidate	Votes	%	±%
National	Jack Marshall	8,317	53.30	
Labour	Jim Bateman	6,506	41.72	+5.20
Social Credit	Richard Donald McLaren	778	4.98	
Majority		1,811	11.60	
Turnout		15,601	87.88	+0.50
Registered electors		17,751		

=== 1951 election ===
1951 general election: Karori
Party	Candidate	Votes	%	±%
National	Charles Bowden	8,128	63.48	−0.15
Labour	Jim Bateman	4,675	36.52	
Majority		3,453	26.97	−0.29
Turnout		12,803	88.38	−2.33
Registered electors		14,486		

=== 1949 election ===
1949 general election: Karori
Party	Candidate	Votes	%	±%
National	Charles Bowden	8,367	63.63	+6.08
Labour	Ethel Harris	4,782	36.37	
Majority		3,585	27.26	+12.16
Turnout		13,149	90.71	+0.43
Registered electors		14,495		

=== 1946 election ===
1946 general election: Karori
Party	Candidate	Votes	%	±%
National	Charles Bowden	7,776	57.55	
Labour	Patrick McGavin	5,734	42.45	
Majority		2,042	15.10	
Turnout		13,510	91.14	
Registered electors		14,822		
