= Ruahine (electorate) =

Ruahine is a former New Zealand parliamentary electorate, from 1972 to 1978.

== Population centres ==
Since the 1969 election, the number of electorates in the South Island was fixed at 25, with continued faster population growth in the North Island leading to an increase in the number of general electorates. There were 84 electorates for the 1969 election, and the 1972 electoral redistribution saw three additional general seats created for the North Island, bringing the total number of electorates to 87. Together with increased urbanisation in Christchurch and Nelson, the changes proved very disruptive to existing electorates. In the South Island, three electorates were abolished, and three electorates were newly created. In the North Island, five electorates were abolished, two electorates were recreated, and six electorates were newly created (including Ruahine).

The Ruahine electorate was located north-east of Palmerston North and followed the Ruahine Range. Settlements included in the electorate were Feilding, Cheltenham, Kiwitea, and Kimbolton. It also included the northern parts of Palmerston North, containing some of the city's highest and lowest valued housing areas, which comprised half of the voters in the electorate. As such it was suggested Ruahine was misnamed as an electorate and would be more accurately known as "North Palmerston North".

== History ==
Les Gandar of the National Party had represented the Manawatu electorate since 1966 and when the Manawatu electorate moved to south of the Palmerston North electorate, Gandar stood in the newly created Ruahine electorate in 1972. He defeated Labour's candidate, Palmerston North City Councillor Sam Mihaere. Three years later Gandar defeated Rex Willing, who was former Prime Minister Norman Kirk's secretary, as well as the deputy leader of the Social Credit Party Les Hunter.

The Ruahine electorate was absorbed into the new Rangitikei electorate in 1978. Gandar was defeated in 1978 general election in Rangitikei by Bruce Beetham. Beetham had won the electorate in the Rangitikei by-election, held earlier in the year on 18 February 1978 after the death of Sir Roy Jack. National planned that Gandar would take over the new electorate at the November general election, and stood an interim candidate, local Jim Bull, in the by-election. But, to general surprise, Beetham won the by-election for Social Credit.

=== Members of Parliament ===
Key

National

Election	Winner
1972 election	Les Gandar
1975 election	Les Gandar
(Electorate abolished in 1978, see Rangitikei)

== Election results ==
=== 1975 election ===
1975 general election: Ruahine
Party	Candidate	Votes	%	±%
National	Les Gandar	9,865	49.63	+3.00
Labour	Rex Willing	7,102	35.73	
Social Credit	Les Hunter	1,952	9.82	+2.74
Values	George Serrallach	957	4.81	
Majority		2,763	13.90	+10.54
Turnout		19,876	85.40	+2.36
Registered electors		23,273		

=== 1972 election ===
1972 general election: Ruahine
Party	Candidate	Votes	%	±%
National	Les Gandar	7,653	46.63	
Labour	Sam Mihaere	7,101	43.26	
Social Credit	Les Hunter	1,162	7.08	
Values	Ronald H. Layton	364	2.21	
Liberal Reform	Allan Walter Bartlett	66	0.40	
New Democratic	Harvey Ernest Edmeades	66	0.40	
Majority		552	3.36	
Turnout		16,412	83.04	
Registered electors		19,763		
