= JJ Stewart =

New Zealand rugby coach

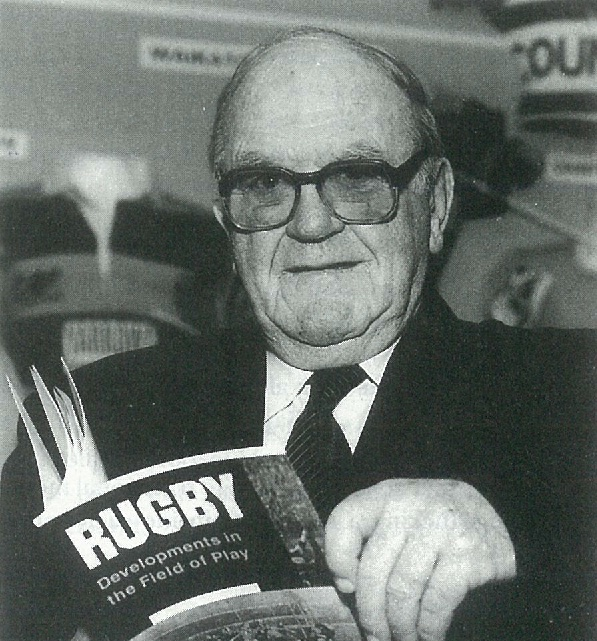
JJ Stewart

John Joseph Stewart MBE (18 July 1923 – 15 November 2002), generally known as JJ Stewart, was a New Zealand rugby union coach and administrator, and secondary school teacher.

== Biography ==
His obituary said that in 1973 when he took over as All Blacks coach, he was the right man at the right time for a team that was scarred and in crisis from a home loss to the British Lions in 1971, a controversial British tour in 1972–73 and a cancelled Springbok tour in 1973.

Stewart was New Zealand selector and All Black coach from 1973 to 1976. For the tour of Australia in 1974 he ditched many stalwarts, picking Andy Leslie as captain and 15 new caps including Bryan Williams and Bruce Robertson. Later Williams said he was a breath of fresh air, Tane Norton said he brought a new era to our game, and Laurie Mains said he could always think outside the square. He prepared All Black teams for 11 tests from 1973 to 1976; and left with six wins, one draw and four losses (three in South Africa in 1976, against a rampant Springbok side)He had been a provincial coach in Taranaki (1963–69) (the province held the Ranfurly Shield for three years) and Wanganui (1970–71), and a secondary school coach in Taranaki. He was North Island selector in 1972 and 1977, and on the New Zealand Rugby Football Union council from 1985 to 1990.

He was born in Northcote, Auckland and died (of cancer) in New Plymouth. He was educated at Monte Cecelia and Sacred Heart Colleges in Auckland, Auckland University College, Auckland Teachers' Training College and Massey University (BA). He earned a degree at 71, and was a Massey University councillor for 12 years.

He was a teacher at New Plymouth Boys' High School from 1948 to 1969, then principal of Flock House near Bulls from 1969 to 1983. He stood as a Labour candidate in the 1978 Rangitikei by-election, in a traditional National seat that was won by Bruce Beetham for Social Credit. Beetham, ironically, had been one of Stewart's students and later a fellow teacher at New Plymouth. He also stood in the 1978 election, for Tarawera. A year later he stood for the Labour candidacy for the Christchurch Central seat in a by-election, but was unsuccessful.

He married Claire Campbell in 1961; she was later a mayor of New Plymouth. They left a daughter and four sons.

Stewart was appointed a Member of the Order of the British Empire in the 1983 Queen's Birthday Honours.

Sporting positions
Preceded by Bob Duff	All Blacks coach 1974—1976	Succeeded by Jack Gleeson
