= 1995 Wellington mayoral election =

New Zealand local election

- 14 October 1995
- Turnout: 59,948 (53.10%)
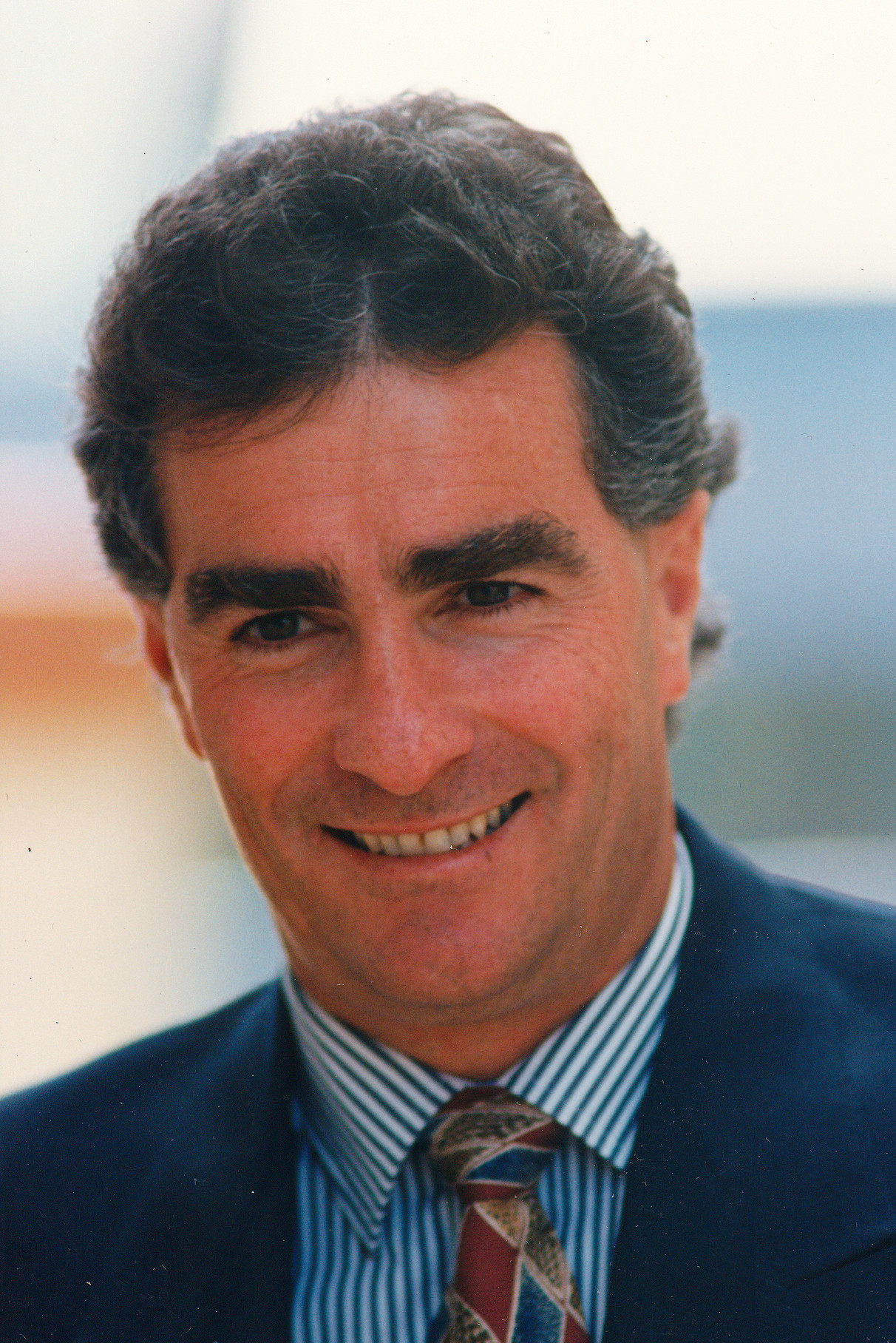

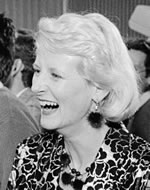
Candidate	Mark Blumsky	Elizabeth Tennet
Party	Independent	Labour
Popular vote	26,372	11,673
Percentage	43.99	19.47
Mayor before election
Fran Wilde
Elected mayor
Mark Blumsky

The 1995 Wellington mayoral election was part of the New Zealand local elections held that same year. In 1995, elections were held for the Mayor of Wellington plus other local government positions. The polling was conducted using the standard first-past-the-post electoral method.

== Background ==
Sitting Mayor Fran Wilde was not renominated by the Labour Party with local members opining that she had drifted too far from Labour policies during her term as mayor. Instead members nominated Eastern ward councillor Hazel Armstrong, though she declined to stand for mayor or the city council. Wilde responded by stating she would stand as an independent if she decided to stand for a second term. She made clear she still supported the Labour Party and praised its leader Helen Clark and her leadership of the party. Clark said Wilde would have her support if she decided to run as an independent candidate.

Ultimately Wilde retired from the role after just one term. When standing in 1992 she intended to run for a second term and stated the decision not to run again was the hardest decision she ever had to make. She cited a wish to gain more privacy and the only way to do so would be to leave the mayoralty. Her decision prompted a record thirteen candidates to run for the position. The Labour Party eventually chose Elizabeth Tennet, the Member of Parliament for Island Bay, as its candidate for the election. It was the last time the Labour Party was to field a mayoral candidate until 2016. Wilde did not support Tennet's candidacy thinking she was not right for the role and she was only standing for mayor because the Island Bay seat was being abolished at the next general election. Tennet and another MP, Graham Kelly, described Wilde as a turncoat for her criticisms.

The former chairman of the now defunct Wellington Harbour Board Nigel Gould was selected as the Citizens' Association candidate, beating out shoe retailer Mark Blumsky and ratepayer advocate Jack Ruben for the nomination. Blumsky was not dissuaded and immediately declared his candidacy as an independent.

The election saw Mark Blumsky win office as Wellington's Mayor. He won a much larger majority than expected, with media anticipating a neck-and-neck result between himself and Tennet. The 1995 elections also saw the decline of the long established Citizens' Association electoral ticket. Gould finished in a disappointing fourth place for mayor and only four Citizens' ticket candidates won seats in the council, a record low. The ticket did not contest another mayoral election and would disband soon after.

== Mayoralty results ==
The following table gives the election results:

1995 Wellington mayoral election
Party	Candidate	Votes	%	±%
Independent	Mark Blumsky	26,372	43.99	
Labour	Elizabeth Tennet	11,673	19.47	
Independent	Helene Ritchie	4,569	7.62	−9.38
Citizens'	Nigel Gould	4,482	7.47	
Independent	Michael Wall	3,657	6.10	
Alliance	Phillida Bunkle	3,336	5.56	
Green	Stephen Rainbow	2,797	4.66	−6.05
Independent	Bryan Pepperell	977	1.62	
McGillicuddy Serious	Ross Gardner	470	0.78	
Independent	Noel Galvin	435	0.72	
Independent	Donald Eddie	253	0.42	
Independent	Raymond Berkahn	149	0.24	
Private Enterprise	Frank Moncur	111	0.18	−0.05
Independent	Bruce Harris	107	0.17	
Informal votes		560	0.93	−0.17
Majority		14,699	24.51	
Turnout		59,948	53.10	−0.16
Registered electors		112,886		

== Ward results ==
Candidates were also elected from wards to the Wellington City Council.

Party/ticket	Councillors
Citizens'	4
Greens	3
Labour	2
Alliance	1
Independent	9
