= Society for Research on Women =

Former New Zealand research organisation

The Society for Research on Women (SROW) was a New Zealand voluntary organisation founded in 1966 to research the position of women and their lives. There was lack of information on women and SROW did research, on a mostly voluntary basis, to support policy and planning relevant to women. Over 70 reports of research were published between 1966 and 1991. Research topics covered motherhood and solo mothers, child care, employment, retraining, the education of girls, housing, caregiving, immigrant women, abortion, finance and retirement. SROW was wound up in 2006.

== History ==
In the 1960s New Zealand women were becoming aware of, and influenced by, the women's movement. Several initiatives to progress the position of women had occurred including the Council for Equal Pay and Opportunity (1957), the Government Service Equal Pay Act (1960), and the Joint Committee on Women and Employment (1964) leading to the National Advisory Council on the Employment of Women (NACEW) in 1967.

In 1966 a series of lectures in Wellington on the Changing Role of Women examined issues for women. The interest generated by the lectures led to SROW's formation. The founders were a group of women associated with a Newlands Playcentre, including Margaret Shields (who was later to become a Member of Parliament), Mary Mowbray and others. They identified the paucity of information on women and believed that information and scientifically grounded research findings could be used to influence government policy.

SROW was active from 1966 until the 1990s. There were several reasons for SROW to be wound up gradually from the early 1990s. Research on women was being done by other bodies and in the universities. The funding from government ceased in the 1980s at the same time the membership was declining. In 1991 it was decided to wind up the national organisation but two branches (Wellington and Christchurch) continued to operate.

When SROW wound up in 2006 its funds were transferred to the New Horizons for Women Trust which was set up by a number of women's organisations, including SROW, to fund research on women's issues and to support women who wanted a second chance at education and training.

== Objectives and research areas ==
- To examine from time to time the attitudes of individuals, groups, and the community to the education of girls and their subsequent employment, the factual situation and the needs of girls and women
- To publicise the findings in the appropriate quarters
- To endeavour by all appropriate means to bring about such changes as may be shown to be desirable.
- To further in every way possible the general interests of women in New Zealand

In line with SROW's goals, the areas of research were broadly:

- becoming a parent
- parenting
- quality of life for families
- education
- employment
- gender related issues (including financial management).

== Structure, membership and funding ==
=== Structure ===
The first SROW branch was in Wellington. By 1973 there were branches in Wellington, Auckland, Christchurch, Dunedin and the Waikato.

SROW was committed to a structure according to feminist organisational principles wherever possible. Its structure was a grassroots one of study groups which proposed, organised and carried out research projects. Branch committees reviewed research proposals and a National Projects Committee advised and provided technical help. This structure and process ensured projects met acceptable research standards. The branches were autonomous but a National Executive of elected officers met once a month to deal with communications, bulletins etc., to set broad policies and standards, and arrange for the publication and distribution of research reports.

=== Membership ===
Membership grew to over 1100 by 1968, decreasing to the 200s by 1987. It waxed and waned with the formation of new branches and recruitment for new projects. Membership declined with the closure of branches and completion of research projects.

In the early days most members were mothers who were not in paid employment but later the number of women in paid employment increased; this reflected the changes in society.

==== Volunteers ====
SROW was founded with the intention of using volunteers to carry out research. This was partly through necessity. But there was a “strong sense of the value of women working for women” as well as using SROW to give women occupational and other opportunities through participation and training in research. This was successful though volunteers could have quite different levels of commitment and research skills. This gave rise to problems around skills required for more intensive and skilled phases of investigations. As time went by some members had become social scientists and the necessary expertise could be found within the membership.

=== Funding ===
SROW received an annual grant from government of $5000 (later $7500) administered by a government-appointed Research Fund Administration Committee (RFAC). It evaluated research design, methods, feasibility, intended use of results and cost estimates but rarely questioned the choice of research topics. The yearly grant ended when the RFAC's functions were transferred to the new Ministry for Women's Affairs in 1988.

Publication of research reports also provided funds.

== Achievements ==
From 1966 to 1991 70 pieces of work were published.

An early publication was Urban Women (1972). Over 5000 women were surveyed on employment and retraining, education, community involvement and leisure interests. It found that 60% of all New Zealand women left school without qualifications and ended up in low-paid, low-status jobs. Mary Mowbray, Joan Stagpoole and Margaret Shields presented the report to the then Minister of Finance, Robert Muldoon.

SROW's research played a key role in exposing women's inequality and disadvantage. By the time of a 1975 conference, Education and the Equality of the Sexes, SROW had demonstrated the usefulness of research as a tool in fighting inequality.

The aim of producing sound research to be used by policy makers and analysts in decision making was realised. The Society also used its own findings to make its own submissions on social policy.

SROW offered its members many opportunities. Research training equipped a number of women to enter the workforce in a research capacity. Members also gained leadership skills. Some became members of parliament, cabinet ministers and Ministers for Women (Margaret Shields and Ann Hercus) or academics in universities. Penny Jamieson, became the first woman Anglican Bishop and Silvia Cartwright became Governor-General of New Zealand. Former members of SROW held many senior positions in the public sector.

== Publications and research reports ==
- An introduction to social research. 1969.
- Unmarried mother : problems involved in keeping her child : case history studies. 1970.
- Unmarried mother : problems involved in keeping her child : case histories. 1971.
- Child care in Auckland : interim reports of two study groups of the Auckland Branch of the Society for Research on Women. (1972?)
- Urban women. 1972.
- Urban women. Supplementary tables. [1972]
- Supplementary tables. Society for Research on Women in New Zealand. Wellington, 1972.
- Employers' attitudes, work opportunity for women : report of a New Zealand survey 1971. 1973.
- Report of curriculum study group on secondary school education of girls. 1973.
- Retraining : some facts and assessments of the problems of women re-entering the labour market. 1973?
- Social education for adolescent girls. 1973?
- Why employ women? 1973.
- Report of a survey carried out by a Wellington branch study group : voluntary workers in the Wellington area. 1973.
- A background on the worldwide education of girls. 1973?
- Research project on geographical mobility. 1974.
- Report on participation in Educational Development Conference. 1974
- Solo mothers : a survey. 1975.
- Services for solo parents in Auckland. 1975.
- Child care in a Wellington suburb. 1975.
- Directory of services for the intellectually handicapped in Auckland. 1975.
- Society for Research on Women : study group report. 1976?
- Report of a survey conducted by the Wellington branch of the Society for Research on Women in New Zealand. 1976.
- SROW handbook: a collection of useful papers. 1976.
- Career, marriage and family : report of a survey. 1976.
- Woman's world : houses and suburbs. 1976.
- Dual career families with pre-schoolers : how do they cope? : case histories. 1976.
- Those who care : report of a survey. 1976.
- One in five : women and school committees. 1977.
- What shall I do? : influences on the decision of unmarried mothers to keep their babies or offer them for adoption. 1977.
- Ownership flat survey. 1977
- The women of Tawa : their present situation and their aspirations for the future : report of a survey. 1977.
- Parentcraft education. 1978?
- Immigrant women : a survey of sixty-two immigrant women in Christchurch. 1979.
- Those who care in Auckland. 1979
- What I did : a follow-up study of the unmarried mother, her decision and its effect on her life ten months after the birth of her baby. 1979.
- Child care in a country town. 1979.
- The family in the community. 1979.
- Next please : a study of doctor-patient interaction. 1980.
- Women and money : a study of financial management in New Zealand households. 1981.
- The abortion experience of some New Zealand women. 1980 [i.e.1981]
- Follow up study of female radio and TV servicing apprentices. Part 1. 1981.
- Personal viewpoints. 1982.
- Education for new parenthood. 1982.
- Women and access to credit and finance in New Zealand. 1982.
- In those days : a study of older women in Wellington. 1982.
- What now? : a study of pre-training courses for women in the Wellington area. 1982.
- Employment beginnings : the employment intentions and experiences of a group of female 5th and 6th form State school-leavers in the Napier-Hastings area. 1982.
- Urban women. 1982 [i.e. 1983].
- Women's employment and unemployment : a research report. 1982.
- House or home : a study of factors affecting the lifestyle of women and their families, living in old and new suburbs in the Wellington region. 1983.
- Bibliography of SROW publications, 1966–1983. 1984.
- The right decision : stage 4 report, unmarried mothers study. 1984.
- The right time : a study of women expecting their first child after the age of thirty. 1984.
- Jobs, children and chores : a study of mothers in paid employment in the Christchurch area. 1984.
- SROW handbook : a collection of useful papers. 1985.
- Study of career patterns in the public service, 1985. 1985.
- Changing jobs, changing choices : a study of career education and new technology in Christchurch secondary schools. 1985.
- Having a baby : the experiences of some Wellington women. 1985.
- Listen to the teacher : an oral history of women who taught in New Zealand, c1925-1945. 1986.
- Politics and porridge : a study of political women. 1986.
- Follow up study of female radio and TV servicing apprentices. Part II. 1986.
- Career development in the Public Service : a comparative study of men and women. Wellington, N.Z. : Society for Research on Women in New Zealand, 1987.
- A-Z of activities for voluntary groups. 1988.
- Time of our lives : a study of mid-life women. 1988.
- Women about town : women of early Christchurch. 1990.
- What has happened? : a review of 25 years of research by the Society for Research on Women in New Zealand (Inc.). 1991.
- Women about town. 1991?
- Women and trade unions : an exploratory study in three Wellington unions. 1991.
- Motherhood after 30 : expectations & experiences. 1991.
- Women centre stage : a study of SROW and its research. 1993.
- The effects of unemployment on women : a report of in-depth interviews with 46 unemployed women in 1989 & 1990 and a follow-up survey in 1993. 1994.
- Glory boxes and flat access : an interim report of the Women's Preparation and Planning for Retirement Project. 1997.
- Towards retirement - women's views : final report of the Women's Preparation and Planning for Retirement Project. 1999.
- Women's walk : herstorical Thorndon / Produced for the Janus Women's Convention. 2005.
