= Les Gandar =

New Zealand politician

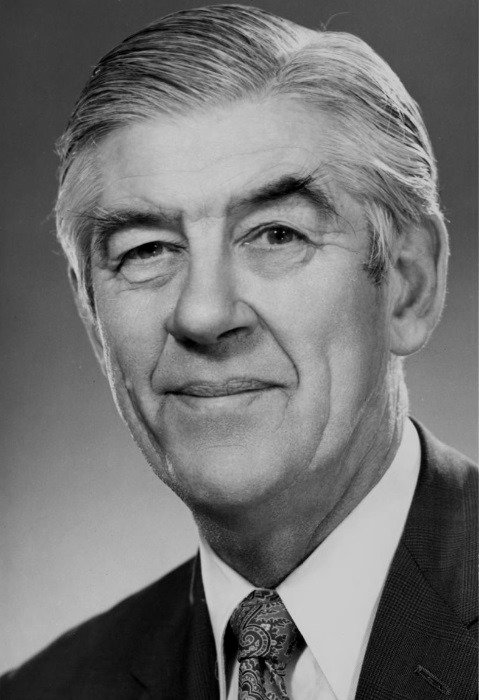
Les Gandar

Leslie Walter Gandar (26 January 1919 – 16 December 1994) was a New Zealand politician of the National Party.

== Biography ==
=== Early life and career ===
Gandar was born in 1919. He received his education from Kelburn Normal, Wellington College, and Victoria University College, from where he graduated with a BSc. During World War II, he fought for the Royal New Zealand Air Force in Britain, the Middle East, and Iran. He returned to his sheep farm in the Manawatu after the war. He was elected onto Pohangina County Council and served from 1952 to 1969, including ten years as chairman. He had a strong interest in education and was on the Massey University Council from 1963 and was the university's chancellor from 1970 to 1975.

=== Political career ===
New Zealand Parliament
Years	Term	Electorate	Party
1966–1969	35th	Manawatu	National
1969–1972	36th	Manawatu	National
1972–1975	37th	Ruahine	National
1975–1978	38th	Ruahine	National

He represented the Manawatu electorate from 1966 to 1972, then Ruahine from 1972 to 1978. He was defeated in 1978 for the Rangitikei electorate by Bruce Beetham. Beetham had won the electorate in the Rangitikei by-election, held earlier in the year on 18 February 1978 after the death of Sir Roy Jack. National planned that Gandar would take over the new electorate at the November general election, and stood an interim candidate, local Jim Bull, in the by-election. But, to general surprise, Beetham won the by-election for Social Credit.

Gandar was a cabinet minister in the Third National Government of New Zealand holding the Education portfolio (1975–1978), and from 1979 to 1982 was the New Zealand High Commissioner to the United Kingdom.

=== Later life and death ===
Gandar died on 16 December 1994 in Wellington and was cremated.

== Honours and awards ==
In 1977, Gandar was awarded the Queen Elizabeth II Silver Jubilee Medal, and in 1990 he received the New Zealand 1990 Commemoration Medal.

== Notes ==
New Zealand Parliament
Preceded by Blair Tennent	Member of Parliament for Manawatu; 1966–1972	Succeeded by Allan McCready
New constituency	Member of Parliament for Ruahine; 1972–1978	Constituency abolished
Political offices
Preceded by Phil Amos	Minister of Education; 1975–1978	Succeeded by Merv Wellington
Diplomatic posts
Preceded by Douglas Carter	High Commissioner of New Zealand to the United Kingdom; 1979–1982	Succeeded by Bill Young
