= Les Hunter (politician) =

New Zealand politician

Leslie William Hunter (2 December 1927 – 30 April 2012) was a New Zealand politician for the Social Credit Political League.

== Early life ==
Hunter was born in Foxton in 1927. At the age of four his family moved to Palmerston North where he attended primary and secondary school. He then proceeded to work as a poultry farmer.

== Political career ==
Hunter was the Social Credit's deputy leader in the 1970s under Bruce Beetham, also serving as the party's parliamentary research officer. Hunter stood as the Social Credit candidate in four elections. He ran for election in 1969 in Palmerston North, for Ruahine in 1972 and 1975, and in Bay of Islands in 1984. From 1972 Hunter was also Social Credit's finance spokesman.

== Later life and death ==
In the 1980s Hunter and his wife Pat moved to Kaikohe where they owned and ran a book and stationery shop. They retired to Papamoa in 2001, and Hunter died at his home there on 30 April 2012. His ashes were buried at Pyes Pa Cemetery.
