= Barry Brill =

New Zealand politician

Barry Edward Brill OBE JP (born 22 October 1940) is a New Zealand lawyer and ex-politician. Brill was parliamentary under-secretary for Energy, Science and Technology, Regional Development and National Development in the Third National Government from 1978 to 1981.

== Early life ==
Brill was born in Te Awamutu on 22 October 1940, the son of Arnold and Clarice Brill, who were dairy farmers at Brills Road, near Kihikihi. He was educated at St Patrick's primary school in Te Awamutu and Sacred Heart College, Auckland. He was admitted as a solicitor in 1964 and graduated LL.M.(Hons) from Victoria University of Wellington in 1967. He later gained an M.ComLaw from University of Auckland and OPM from Harvard Business School (2000).

In February 1963, Brill married Pauline Hannon, and the couple would have five children. He later married Robyn Stent and they live in the Bay of Islands.

Admitted as a partner in a Wellington law firm in 1964, he subsequently practised as Brill Adlam & Mollard in Paraparaumu, which then merged to form McGrath, Vickerman, Brill & Partners in 1977. He lectured in Commercial Law at the Central Institute of Technology and Victoria University Law School. In 1969, Brill was appointed as the youngest ever director of the New Zealand Broadcasting Corporation. He was elected to the Wellington Free Ambulance Board 1973-76 and the Wellington Hospital Board 1974–77. He also served as a Trustee of the Wellington Trustee Savings Bank.

== Member of Parliament ==
New Zealand Parliament
Years	Term	Electorate	Party
1975–1978	38th	Kapiti	National
1978–1981	39th	Kapiti	National

Brill was a member of the National Party and served on its Dominion Council. It was anticipated that Brill would win the National nomination to replace the retiring Dan Riddiford in the Wellington Central electorate, but he was surprisingly beaten by Ken Comber. He instead stood for the electorate of Kapiti in the 1972 election unsuccessfully, but won the seat in the 1975 election. He was Chairman of the Statutes Revision Committee, the Pacific Islands Affairs Committee and the ad hoc Select Committees on Misuse of Drugs, and the Human Rights Commission Bill. In the 1978 election, Brill initially lost the Kapiti electorate by 15 votes, but contested the result with an Electoral Petition in the High Court, and was ultimately declared the winner by 23 votes. He was appointed Parliamentary Under-Secretary to the Minister of Energy, Science and Technology, Regional Development and National Development in the Third National Government from 1978 to 1981. In the 1981 election he was defeated by Margaret Shields.

Brill stood for ACT New Zealand in Northland in the 2011 general election, where he received 0.83% of the candidate vote.

== Business ==
After leaving Parliament, Brill was appointed Wellington regional manager of Neil Cropper Ltd and General Manager Corporate Affairs for Wattie Industries Ltd (Watties). He then became chairman of Wattie International and Wattie Meat Activities Group. After Wattie merged with Goodman Group Ltd in 1987, he chaired the Diversified Activities Group of Goodman Fielder Wattie Ltd. During the 1980s, he was a director of NZSE-listed companies Waitaki International Ltd, Allflex Holdings Ltd, and Hawkes Bay Farmers Meat Co Ltd. He was also a director of the Martha Hill Gold Mine JV, Protech Engineering Ltd, Advanced Foods Ltd, Supercool Refrigeration Ltd, Agrico Developments Ltd, Amlamco Meats Ltd, Wattie Singapore Ltd, and Dynasty Foods (Thailand) Ltd.

In 1989, Brill led a management buyout of Supercool Refrigeration Ltd and Hoverd Industries Ltd, which later acquired Contract Refrigeration Ltd (1991) and McAlpine Refrigeration Ltd (1993) and extended into Australia, Shanghai and Dubai. In 1999, Brill sold his controlling interest to USA-based Hussmann Corporation, now a subsidiary of Panasonic. The commercial refrigeration and air conditioning business continues to operate out of Auckland as McAlpine Hussmann Ltd.

Brill is a Fellow of the New Zealand Institute of Directors. He was national president of the New Zealand Manufacturers Federation 1988–91 and a director of the New Zealand Employers Federation and the Export Institute of New Zealand. He was president of the Employers & Manufacturers Association (EMA) in 1998-2001 and founding vice-president of Business New Zealand in 2002–4. He was Group B chair of the New Zealand-Japan Business Association and an executive member of the Pacific Basin Economic Council.

Brill was named in the National Business Review "Rich List" during 1997–99.

== Energy Interests ==
While Associate Minister of Energy, Brill was Chairman of the New Zealand Gas Council _1979 - 1981), and was the Leader of the Gas Investment Mission to the United Kingdom in 1981. He was a director of Petrocorp (1982 - 1986).

In 1990, Brill was appointed by the then Labour Government as a director of Waitemata Electric Power Board, New Zealand's second-largest electric utility, and was elected chairman. After Waitemata Electricity was privatised, he was founder Chairman of Power New Zealand, which became the second-largest company (by capitalisation) on the New Zealand Exchange. He was also Chairman of Pacific Energy, the country's first and largest trader in the wholesale electricity market. Brill became national president of the Electricity Supply Association in 1993–4 and was appointed to the Board of EMCO (Electricity Market Company) which established the New Zealand electricity exchange.

More recently, Brill has been active in challenging establishment climate scientists' views on global warming. Since 2009, he has been Chairman of the New Zealand Climate Science Coalition. He acted for the New Zealand Climate Science Education Trust, a charitable organisation that took a judicial review against the National Institute of Water and Atmospheric Research (NIWA), alleging that New Zealand's century-long temperature record (the 7SS) was skewed by non-random adjustments. The Trust lost its case and was ordered to pay costs. Brill is a co-author of the subsequent scientific journal paper, de Freitas et al. (2014).

== Travel ==
In recent decades, Brill's major interest has been world travel. He has been to all the world's continents on multiple occasions and has so far visited over 192 out of the 194 UN countries. According to the 2020 databases of both Most Traveled People and Nomad Mania, he is the most widely travelled person currently resident in New Zealand while his wife is the most widely travelled New Zealand woman.

== Honours and awards ==
Brill was awarded the Queen Elizabeth II Silver Jubilee Medal and the New Zealand 1990 Commemoration Medal. In the 1996 New Year Honours, he was appointed an Officer of the Order of the British Empire, for services to manufacturing.

Brill was appointed a justice of the peace in 1985.

New Zealand Parliament
Preceded by Frank O'Flynn	Member of Parliament for Kapiti; 1975–1981	Succeeded by Margaret Shields
