= Frank O'Flynn =

New Zealand politician

The Right Honourable Frank O'Flynn QC
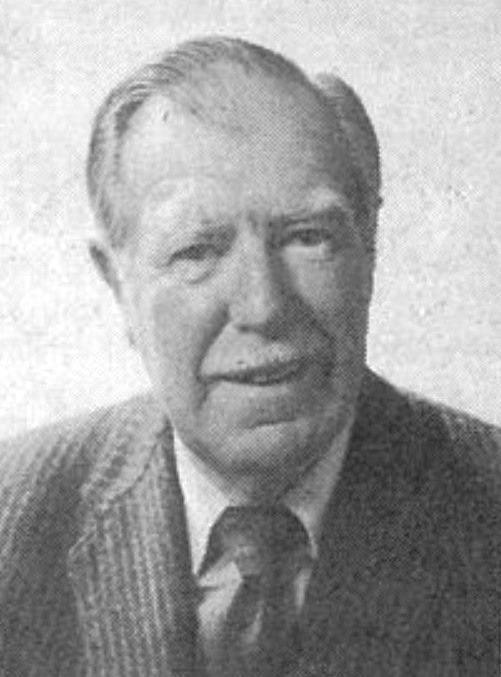

28th Minister of Defence
- In office 26 July 1984 – 24 July 1987
- Prime Minister: David Lange
- Preceded by: David Thomson
- Succeeded by: Bob Tizard

Member of the New Zealand Parliament for Island Bay
- In office 25 November 1978 – 15 August 1987
- Preceded by: Gerald O'Brien
- Succeeded by: Elizabeth Tennet

Member of the New Zealand Parliament for Kapiti
- In office 25 November 1972 – 29 November 1975
- Succeeded by: Barry Brill

Personal details
- Born: 24 October 1918 Runanga, New Zealand
- Died: 17 October 2003 (aged 84) Paraparaumu, New Zealand
- Party: Labour
- Spouse: Sylvia Elizabeth Hefford (m. 1942)
- Relations: Francis Edward O'Flynn (father)
- Children: 4
- Profession: Lawyer
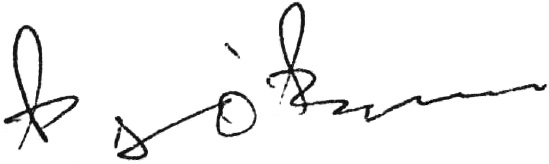
- Signature

Military service
- Allegiance: RNZAF
- Years of service: 1942–45
- Rank: Flight lieutenant
- Battles/wars: World War II

Francis Duncan O'Flynn PC QC (24 October 1918 – 17 October 2003) was a New Zealand politician of the Labour Party.

== Early life and family ==
O'Flynn was born in Runanga in 1918. He was the son of Francis Edward O'Flynn and Margaret Helen Valentine Duncan. He received his education at Christchurch Normal School and Christchurch Boys' High School. He received his BA in 1940, and joined the Royal New Zealand Air Force in 1942.

He married Sylvia Elizabeth Hefford in 1942 and they had four children. He obtained his LLB in 1947 and LLM in 1948.

== Early political and legal career ==
At the 1947, 1950 and 1953 local-body elections, O'Flynn stood unsuccessfully for the Wellington City Council on the Labour Party ticket.

O'Fynn served as a law clerk at O'Regan and Arndt in Wellington until 1954. He was a barrister and solicitor until 1968, when he was named Queen's Counsel (QC). He represented the victims of the Wahine ferry disaster in 1968. Also in 1968 he was elected a member of the Otaki Borough Council. In 1971 he stood unsuccessfully for the Wellington Hospital Board.

O'Flynn represented Brian Brooks in 1972, where Brooks successfully sued deputy prime minister Robert Muldoon for defamation for remarks Muldoon made on a 1972 television programme. O'Flynn's cross-examination of Muldoon generated much interest, and was described in his Law Society obituary as a highlight of his career.

== Parliamentary career ==
New Zealand Parliament
Years	Term	Electorate	Party
1972–1975	37th	Kapiti	Labour
1978–1981	39th	Island Bay	Labour
1981–1984	40th	Island Bay	Labour
1984–1987	41st	Island Bay	Labour

O'Flynn represented the seat of Kapiti from 1972 to 1975, when he was defeated. Soon after losing his seat he went to Nelson to seek the Labour candidacy for the Nelson seat in a 1976 by-election, but was unsuccessful. O'Flynn's attempt was not helped by an effort to seek candidates with links to Nelson as there were fears in the area that MPs who had lost their seats in 1975 would become "parachute candidates". He was the only defeated candidate to try for the nomination.

Following his attempt in Nelson, O'Flynn seriously considered standing for the Wellington mayoralty in 1977, but he withdrew in favour of Sir Frank Kitts. At the same election he stood for the Wellington City Council and was elected. Between 1980 and 1981 he was leader of the Labour caucus on the council. He was re-elected in 1980, but unexpectedly lost his seat on the council in 1983. His defeat was in the wake of him hinting that he would rethink his position on the council should he become a cabinet minister after being promoted earlier in 1983.

Following the controversial de-selection of Gerald O'Brien, O'Flynn was selected as his replacement in the Island Bay electorate. O'Brien ran as an independent candidate and drew away many former Labour voters causing O'Flynn to come close to losing one of Labour's safest seats. He was elected narrowly by 650 votes and represented Island Bay from 1978 to 1987, when he retired due to ill health. Soon after returning to Parliament he was appointed as Shadow Minister of Health by leader Bill Rowling. He was later shifted from Health to be Shadow Minister of Justice in 1981. O'Flynn was a backer of David Lange for leader and was rewarded by being promoted to the front bench and given the role of Shadow Attorney-General. Following Labour's victory at the 1984 election O'Flynn was naturally expected to in both political and legal circles to become Attorney-General, but Lange had been persuaded by his deputy Geoffrey Palmer (who had been O'Flynn's legal clerk decades earlier) to appoint him to the role instead.

During the Fourth Labour Government he was a cabinet minister and served as Minister of Defence from 1984 to 1987. He was also Minister of State, Minister in charge of War Pensions, Minister in charge of Rehabilitation, Deputy Minister of Foreign Affairs and Associate Minister of Overseas Trade and Marketing. As Minister of Defence he famously said that "he would defend New Zealand by blowing up bridges and tunnels." He was instrumental in developing Labour's nuclear-free policies, which despite resulting in the breakdown of ANZUS, O'Flynn described as "by far the brightest thing [the Government] had done." He had a meeting in Malaysia in 1985 with United States Secretary of State George Shultz, where Shultz lambasted New Zealand's stance but O'Flynn defended their position resulting in deadlock.

O'Flynn disliked the defence portfolio and felt the officials at the Ministry of Defence took him for granted on many issues. On three occasions (July, August and December 1985) he threatened to resign as minister after Lange failed to back him during a disagreement with officials regarding the posting of a Defence official overseas at great cost to the taxpayer. O'Flynn thought that it was a waste of public money and that the official was little more than "a big, dull fat Poo-Bah". His bench mate Michael Bassett felt that O'Flynn's dislike of the defence portfolio was more an expression of his disappointment that Lange had broken his promise of giving him the position of attorney-general. O'Flynn and Lange became increasingly estranged and their communications were reduced to being conducted through Bassett as an intermediary. Not long after deciding to retire, he suffered a stroke (which he later recovered from) and was unable to deliver his valedictory speech in Parliament. It was read instead by Mike Moore on his behalf.

O'Flynn was appointed to the Privy Council in 1987; however, his ill-health prevented him from travelling to England to be sworn into the Privy Council by Queen Elizabeth II.

== Life after politics ==
O'Flynn suffered a stroke in 1987 that led to a permanent disability, and he retired to Raumati Beach.

O'Flynn died on 17 October 2003 in Paraparaumu, a week shy of his 85th birthday, and was buried at Karori Cemetery. His wife, Sylvia O'Flynn, died in 2012.

== Honours and awards ==
In 1977, O'Flynn was awarded the Queen Elizabeth II Silver Jubilee Medal, and in 1990 he received the New Zealand 1990 Commemoration Medal.

== Notes ==
Political offices
Preceded by David Thomson	Minister of Defence; 1984–1987	Succeeded by Bob Tizard
New Zealand Parliament
New constituency	Member of Parliament for Kapiti; 1972–1975	Succeeded by Barry Brill
Preceded by Gerald O'Brien	Member of Parliament for Island Bay; 1978–1987	Succeeded by Elizabeth Tennet
