= Claire Stewart (politician) =

New Zealand politician (1941–2020)

Claire Stewart QSO

22nd Mayor of New Plymouth
- In office 1992–2001
- Preceded by: David Lean
- Succeeded by: Peter Tennent

Personal details
- Born: Claire Lois Campbell; 17 June 1941
- Died: 29 March 2020 (aged 78) Tewantin, Queensland, Australia
- Spouse: JJ Stewart (m. 1961; died 2002)
- Children: 5

Claire Lois Stewart QSO (17 June 1941 – 29 March 2020) was a New Zealand politician who served as mayor of New Plymouth from 1992 until 2001. She was the first woman to hold this position.

== Biography ==
Stewart was born on 17 June 1941. In 1961 she married JJ Stewart, a high school teacher and rugby coach eighteen years her senior and a drinking mate of her father. By the time she was 28, they had five children together.

Stewart was elected to the New Plymouth District Council in 1989. She also served on the Taranaki Regional Council and the Taranaki District Health Board. In 1992, she was elected mayor. During her time in office she extended the New Plymouth Coastal Walkway, built a domestic violence shelter, and began the process of building Puke Ariki. In 2000, she was considered a frontrunner to be elected president of Local Government New Zealand, but the position was ultimately filled by Basil Morrison, the mayor of Hauraki. She retired in 2001 to look after her husband who was ill. He died the next year.

In the 2002 New Year Honours, Stewart was appointed a Companion of the Queen's Service Order for public services. In 2010, she moved to the Shire of Noosa in Australia to be closer to family. Stewart died at her nursing home in Tewantin on 29 March 2020 after a long illness, one day after her daughter-in-law, also named Clare Stewart, was elected mayor of Noosa. After two years of delay due to the COVID-19 pandemic, a memorial service for Stewart was held in New Plymouth on 17 June 2022.
