= Brian O'Brien (journalist) =

New Zealand boxer, journalist and politician (1922–1982)

Brian O'Brien JP
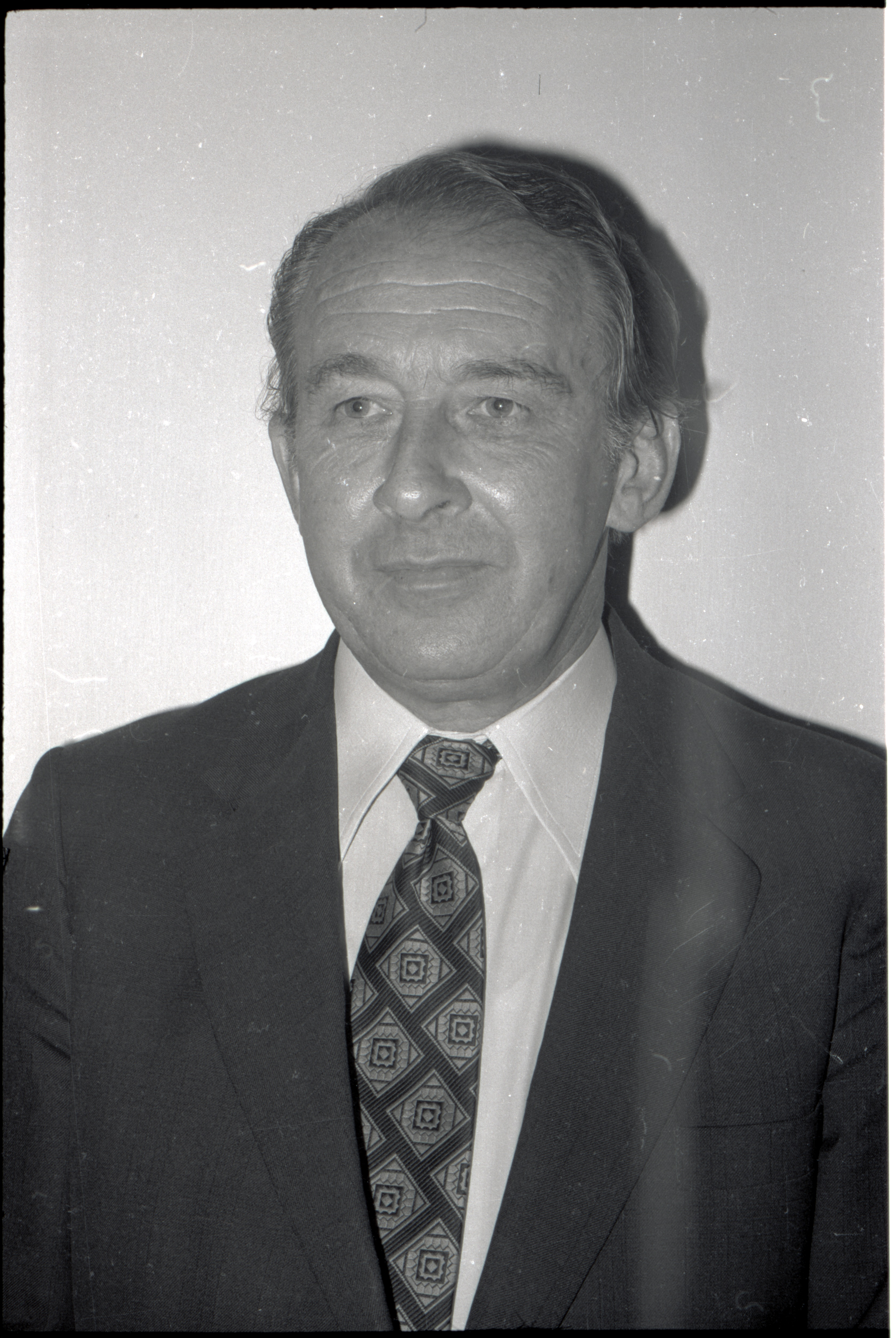
- O'Brien in 1976

Member of the Wellington City Council
- In office 9 October 1971 – 11 October 1980
- Constituency: At-large

Personal details
- Born: Brian Francis O'Brien; 12 December 1922 Wellington, New Zealand
- Died: 1 May 1982 (aged 59) Wellington, New Zealand
- Party: Labour
- Spouse: Valerie McNicol (m. 1948)
- Relations: Gerald O'Brien (brother)
- Children: 2
- Profession: Sports journalist

Brian Francis O'Brien JP (12 December 1922 – 1 May 1982) was a New Zealand boxer, journalist and politician.

== Biography ==
=== Early life and career ===
O'Brien was born in 1922 and educated at Marist Newtown and St Patrick's College in Wellington. As a child he developed an interest in sports, particularly boxing and wrestling and to a lesser extent cricket and rugby. He competed in youth boxing himself before beginning a career in journalism after leaving school, working for a time at The Evening Post newspaper. During World War II he served in the Royal New Zealand Air Force.

In 1948 he married Valerie McNicol, with whom he had two sons. In 1949 O'Brien started the magazine Sports Digest where his writing on boxing, cricket, and rugby in particular were well regarded. In 1960 he published the book Kiwis with Gloves On, which recounted the history of boxing in New Zealand.

=== Boxing administration ===
O'Brien was the first New Zealander to be appointed a boxing judge at the Commonwealth Games level. He was also on the international judges panel for many years. After qualifying as a judge in 1958, he later became an International Boxing Association appointed judge and officiated at both the 1962 and 1974 Commonwealth Games.

O'Brien was president of the Wellington Boxing Association. He represented the New Zealand National Boxing Council, on the executive of the New Zealand Olympic and Commonwealth Games Association. Boxing New Zealand described O'Brien as a "legendary identity" who "... did more to promote the sport of boxing both at professional and amateur levels, than any other individual during the first hundred years of the New Zealand Boxing Association."

=== Political career ===
O'Brien's brother, Gerald O'Brien, was a Wellington City Councillor from 1965 to 1971 and later elected a Member of Parliament in 1969. At the 1971 local-body election he replaced his brother on the Labour Party ticket for the city council and was elected. He was re-elected twice in 1974 and 1977. In 1980 he did not seek re-election, being forced to retire from the council due to ill health.

=== Death ===
In 1979 ill health forced O'Brien to cease publication of the Sports Digest after thirty years. He died on 1 May 1982, aged 59.

== Honours and awards ==
O'Brien was a life member of the Wellington Boxing Association and he had been approved for life membership of the New Zealand Boxing Association at the time of his death. He was also a life member of the St Patrick's Old Boys' Cricket Club. He was a Justice of the Peace.

The New Zealand Amateur Boxing Championships have awarded the Brian O'Brien Trophy annually since 1983 for "Services to Boxing". The Brian F O'Brien Memorial Prize in Sports Journalism has since 2012 been awarded annually to the student who submits a portfolio containing the two best sports articles while studying a Graduate Diploma in Journalism at Massey University.

== Works by O'Brien ==
- O'Brien, Brian F (1960). Kiwis with Gloves On. Wellington: A.H. and A.W. Reed. OCLC 973436567.
