= Elizabeth Tennet =

New Zealand politician

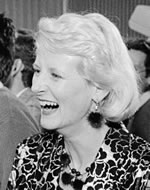
- Tennet in 1987

Member of the New Zealand Parliament for Island Bay
- In office 1987–1996
- Preceded by: Frank O'Flynn
- Succeeded by: constituency abolished

Personal details
- Born: Elizabeth Patricia Tennet; 1953 (age 72–73) Feilding, New Zealand
- Party: Labour
- Children: 1
- Education: Massey University; Victoria University

Elizabeth Patricia Tennet (born 1953) is a former New Zealand politician.

== Biography ==
=== Early life ===
Tennet was born in 1953 in Feilding. She was educated locally before studying at Massey and Victoria University. Before entering politics, she worked as an official at the Department of Labour and as a trade union organiser as general secretary of the Central Clerical Workers Union.

Prior to entering Parliament, Tennet was involved in the Labour Party at an organisational level. She was a member of Labour's Women's Council, the Regional Council for the Wellington region and a member of Labour's National Executive.

=== Political career ===
New Zealand Parliament
Years	Term	Electorate	Party
1987–1990	42nd	Island Bay	Labour
1990–1993	43rd	Island Bay	Labour
1993–1996	44th	Island Bay	Labour

She was an MP from 1987 to 1996, representing the Labour Party. She was first elected to Parliament in the 1987 elections as MP for the Wellington electorate of Island Bay, replacing the retiring Frank O'Flynn. She gave birth to her son while an MP and travelled to Parliament with her 24-day-old child to attend a special caucus meeting in 1988 to support Prime Minister David Lange in a leadership challenge by sacked finance minister Roger Douglas.

In 1990 she became Labour's junior whip as well as becoming party spokesperson on employment and associate spokesperson on women's affairs. In 1993, Tennet was awarded the New Zealand Suffrage Centennial Medal.

In the 1995 local elections she was chosen as the Labour Party's candidate for the Wellington mayoralty to replace the retiring Fran Wilde. Tennet came second in the election behind Mark Blumsky. Media were anticipating a neck-and-neck result between herself and Blumsky, but Blumsky won a much larger majority than expected. Wilde did not support Tennet's candidacy thinking she was not right for the role and she was only standing for mayor because the Island Bay seat was being abolished at the next general election. Tennet and another MP, Graham Kelly, described Wilde as a turncoat for her criticisms.

Tennet, the third woman to have a child whilst an MP, decided that her priorities had changed since entering politics in order to spend more time with her six-year-old son she decided to retire from parliament at the 1996 election.

=== Later activities ===
In 2009, Tennet was appointed chief executive of industry development organisation Textiles New Zealand. In 2011 she became the chief executive of Community Law Centres o Aotearoa

== Notes ==
New Zealand Parliament
Preceded by Frank O'Flynn	Member of Parliament for Island Bay; 1987–1996	Constituency abolished
