= Roger Sowry =

New Zealand politician (born 1958)

The Honourable Roger Sowry ONZM
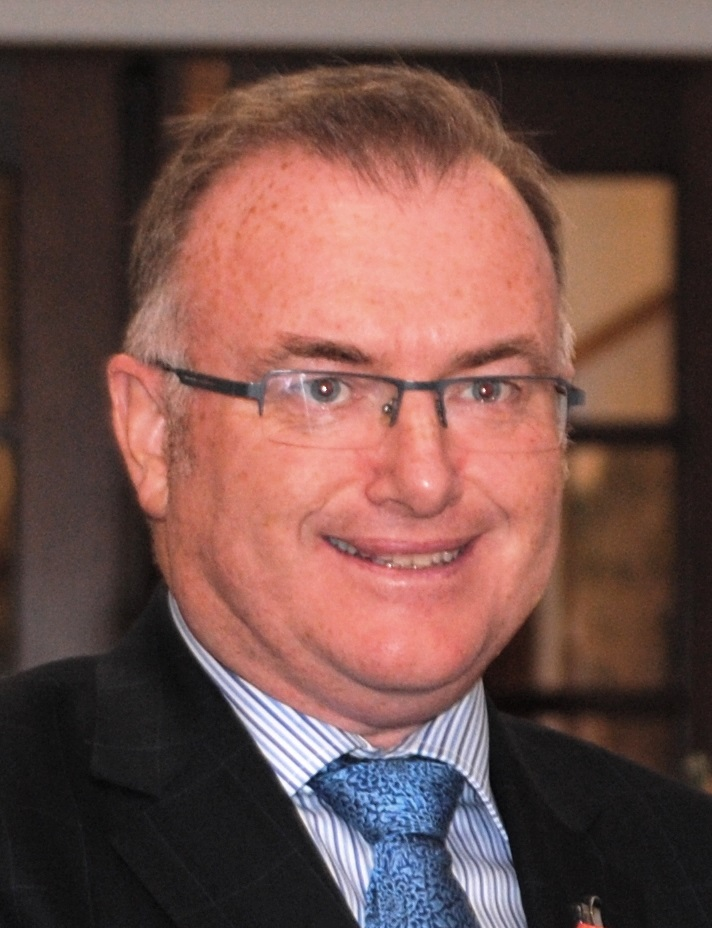

7th Leader of the House
- In office 31 August 1998 – 10 December 1999
- Prime Minister: Jenny Shipley
- Preceded by: Wyatt Creech
- Succeeded by: Michael Cullen

Member of the New Zealand Parliament for Kapiti
- In office 27 October 1990 – 12 October 1996
- Preceded by: Margaret Shields
- Succeeded by: constituency abolished

Personal details
- Born: 2 December 1958 (age 67) Palmerston North, New Zealand
- Party: National

Roger Morrison Sowry ONZM (born 2 December 1958) is a former New Zealand politician. He is a member of the National Party, and was the deputy leader from 2001 to 2003.

== Early life ==
Sowry was born in Palmerston North, and attended Tararua College in Pahiatua where he was head boy. His education included an American Field Service exchange to Minnesota in 1977, and a Diploma of Business Administration from Victoria University of Wellington. After working for a time at the Valuation Department, Sowry was employed by Hannahs, shoe manufacturers and retailers as a retail manager. He is Anglican, and married with four children.

== Member of Parliament ==
New Zealand Parliament
| Years | Term | Electorate | List | Party |
|---|---|---|---|---|
| 1990–1993 | 43rd | Kapiti | | National |
| 1993–1996 | 44th | Kapiti | | National |
| 1996–1999 | 45th | List | 15 | National |
| 1999–2002 | 46th | List | 7 | National |
| 2002–2005 | 47th | List | 2 | National |

Sowry joined the National Party in 1977, and was active in its youth wing. In the 1987 election, beat out anti-abortion activist Marilyn Pryor for the National candidacy to challenge Labour Party MP Margaret Shields in the Kapiti electorate. The challenge was unsuccessful, but a second attempt in the 1990 election was successful; he defeated Shields and entered Parliament. Sowry kept the seat until the 1996 election, when he unsuccessfully contested the new Otaki seat against Labour's Judy Keall and became a list MP.

In 1993, Sowry was appointed as his party's Junior Whip, and in 1995, he became Senior Whip.

=== Member of Cabinet ===
In December 1996, he was elevated to Cabinet, becoming Minister of Social Welfare. In 1998, the role was reorganized, becoming Minister of Social Services, Work and Income. He also served for a time as Minister in charge of War Pensions, Minister responsible for the Housing Corporation (state housing), and Associate Minister of Health. In January 1999, he was given special responsibility for co-ordinating National's relationship with the groups that it relied upon for support (Mauri Pacific, Mana Wahine, and others).

In October 2001, when Bill English displaced Jenny Shipley as leader of the National Party, Sowry (who had played a significant role in English's rise) became National's deputy leader. He remained in this position until English himself was displaced by Don Brash in October 2003.

== Resignation ==
On 13 July 2004, Sowry announced that he would not seek re-election, saying that he was looking for a change of career. Sowry denied there were tensions between himself and the party's new leadership. Brash publicly praised Sowry's "outstanding contribution" over the years.

Until 2008 he was the Chief Executive of Arthritis New Zealand, subsequently moving to Saunders Unsworth, as a consultant on Government matters.

In the 2011 New Year Honours, Sowry was appointed an Officer of the New Zealand Order of Merit for services as a Member of Parliament. In 2013, Sowry was appointed a member of the Representation Commission to determine New Zealand electoral boundaries.

== See also ==
- Fourth National Government of New Zealand

New Zealand Parliament
| Preceded by Margaret Shields | Member of Parliament for Kapiti; 1990–1996 | Constituency abolished |
| Preceded by Wyatt Creech | Leader of the House; 1998–1999 | Succeeded by Michael Cullen |
Party political offices
| Preceded by Bill English | Deputy Leader of the National Party; 2001–2003 | Succeeded by Nick Smith |
