= Francis Edward O'Flynn =

New Zealand politician (1872–1942)

Francis Edward O'Flynn (24 July 1872 – 18 June 1942) was a member of the New Zealand Legislative Council from 22 September 1937 to 18 June 1942, when he died aged 69. He was appointed by the Labour Government.

He was born in Greymouth, and was a schoolteacher. He was headmaster of Runanga School, and as a civil servant could not engage in politics. He wrote pamphlets for first the Socialist Party and then the Labour Party under the pseudonym of Ballot Box. In 1912 he co-authored a pamphlet about the Waihi miners' strike The Tragic Story of the Waihi Strike with Harry Holland and Robert Samuel Ross.

He married Margaret Helen Valentine Duncan in 1915. Their son Frank O'Flynn was a lawyer and Labour Member of Parliament.
