= Kapiti (electorate) =

Kapiti 2025 electorate boundaries

Interactive map of boundaries at the 2026 general election

Kapiti is a New Zealand electorate, returning a single member to the New Zealand House of Representatives. A former electorate from 1972 to 1996, it has been recreated with new boundaries for the 2026 general election.

== Population centres ==
The 2025 boundaries for Kapiti extend from north of Ōtaki to the northern suburbs of Porirua, including the communities of Whitby, Pāuatahanui, Paremata, Plimmerton, Hongoeka, Pukerua Bay, Paekākāriki, Paraparaumu, Waikanae and Ōtaki.

At the electorate's creation in 1972, its main population centres were Paraparaumu, Ōtaki, Raumati Beach, Raumati South and Waikanae, north of Wellington on the Kāpiti Coast. The 1977 electoral redistribution saw the electorate move south, and Ōtaki and Waikanae transferred to the newly created Horowhenua electorate. Waikanae came back to the Kapiti electorate through the 1987 electoral redistribution.

== History ==
Since the 1969 election, the number of electorates in the South Island was fixed at 25, with continued faster population growth in the North Island leading to an increase in the number of general electorates. There were 84 electorates for the 1969 election, and the 1972 electoral redistribution saw three additional general seats created for the North Island, bringing the total number of electorates to 87. Together with increased urbanisation in Christchurch and Nelson, the changes proved very disruptive to existing electorates. In the South Island, three electorates were abolished, and three electorates were newly created. In the North Island, five electorates were abolished, two electorates were recreated, and six electorates were newly created (including Kapiti).

The electorate was regarded as a bellwether and changed between National and Labour several times. National's Allan McCready had represented the Otaki electorate since 1960; when Otaki was abolished in 1972 McCready transferred to Manawatu (which picked up the town of Levin from Otaki). Frank O'Flynn of the Labour Party won the 1972 election against National's Barry Brill, but Brill in turn defeated Flynn in 1975. Brill held his seat in the 1978 election by 83 votes on a magisterial recount and lost to Labour's Margaret Shields in 1981. Roger Sowry reclaimed the seat for National in the 1990 election.

Kapiti was disestablished in 1996 and its population was divided between the Mana and Otaki electorates. The incumbent Sowry stood for Otaki but lost to Labour's Judy Keall.

The 2025 boundary review required a reduction in North Island electorates by one to reflect nationwide population shifts. The three Wellington City electorates (Rongotai, Wellington Central and Ōhāriu) were all underpopulated. All were abolished with flow-on effects for the wider region. The Mana and Ōtaki electorates were also abolished, with the Kapiti electorate being reinstated to represent north Porirua and the Kāpiti Coast.

=== Members of Parliament ===
Key

Labour National

Election	Winner
1972 election	Frank O'Flynn
1975 election	Barry Brill
1978 election	Barry Brill
1981 election	Margaret Shields
1984 election	Margaret Shields
1987 election	Margaret Shields
1990 election	Roger Sowry
1993 election	Roger Sowry
(Electorate abolished in 1996, see Otaki and Mana)

== Election results ==
=== 2026 election ===
The next election will be held on 7 November 2026. Candidates for Kapiti are listed at Candidates in the 2026 New Zealand general election by electorate § Kapiti. Official results will be available after 27 November 2026.

=== 1993 election ===
1993 general election: Kapiti
Party	Candidate	Votes	%	±%
National	Roger Sowry	9,241	38.83	−9.94
Labour	Rob Calder	8,203	34.47	
Alliance	Mike Smith	4,182	17.57	
NZ First	David Craig Stevenson	1,431	6.01	
Christian Heritage	John Halsted	506	2.12	
McGillicuddy Serious	Anthony Church	153	0.64	
Natural Law	Barbara Stumbles	78	0.32	
Majority		1,038	4.36	−2.56
Turnout		23,794	88.96	+0.42
Registered electors		26,745		

=== 1990 election ===
1990 general election: Kapiti
Party	Candidate	Votes	%	±%
National	Roger Sowry	11,262	48.77	+6.96
Labour	Margaret Shields	9,663	41.84	−12.66
NewLabour	Robert Hawke	1,219	5.27	
Democrats	Lowell Manning	433	1.87	
McGillicuddy Serious	Sam Buchanan	319	1.38	
Social Credit	K R Squire	195	0.84	
Majority		1,599	6.92	
Turnout		23,091	88.54	−2.39
Registered electors		26,079		

=== 1987 election ===
1987 general election: Kapiti
Party	Candidate	Votes	%	±%
Labour	Margaret Shields	11,854	54.50	+4.12
National	Roger Sowry	9,094	41.81	
Democrats	R E Carpenter	656	3.01	
McGillicuddy Serious	P. Consuela Gunn	143	0.65	
Majority		2,760	12.69	−7.80
Turnout		21,747	90.93	−3.11
Registered electors		23,914		

=== 1984 election ===
1984 general election: Kapiti
Party	Candidate	Votes	%	±%
Labour	Margaret Shields	11,098	50.38	+5.93
National	June Oakley	6,584	29.89	
NZ Party	Robin Harris	3,712	16.85	
Social Credit	Lowell Manning	632	2.86	
Majority		4,514	20.49	+18.18
Turnout		22,026	94.04	+1.65
Registered electors		23,420		

=== 1981 election ===
1981 general election: Kapiti
Party	Candidate	Votes	%	±%
Labour	Margaret Shields	9,491	44.45	+1.47
National	Barry Brill	8,996	42.13	−0.97
Social Credit	Don Briggs	2,861	13.40	
Majority		495	2.31	
Turnout		21,348	92.39	+18.88
Registered electors		23,106		

=== 1978 election ===
1978 general election: Kapiti
Party	Candidate	Votes	%	±%
National	Barry Brill	8,211	43.10	−7.11
Labour	Margaret Shields	8,188	42.98	
Social Credit	Dick Collins	2,345	12.31	+6.65
Values	V M Harward	305	1.60	
Majority		23	0.12	−9.96
Turnout		19,049	73.51	−13.68
Registered electors		25,910		

=== 1975 election ===
1975 general election: Kapiti
Party	Candidate	Votes	%	±%
National	Barry Brill	11,068	50.21	+5.77
Labour	Frank O'Flynn	8,846	40.13	−8.52
Social Credit	Dick Collins	1,248	5.66	
Values	Joan Beaufort	881	3.99	+1.83
Majority		2,222	10.08	
Turnout		22,043	87.19	−2.26
Registered electors		25,279		

=== 1972 election ===
1972 general election: Kapiti
Party	Candidate	Votes	%	±%
Labour	Frank O'Flynn	8,161	48.65	
National	Barry Brill	7,455	44.44	
Social Credit	John Harold Arnott	732	4.36	
Values	Joan Beaufort	363	2.16	
New Democratic	John Robert Vincent	62	0.36	
Majority		706	4.20	
Turnout		16,773	89.45	
Registered electors		18,751		
