= 1978 Rangitikei by-election =

New Zealand by-election

← 1975 general	18 February 1978	1978 general →
- Turnout: 14,164 (62.32%)
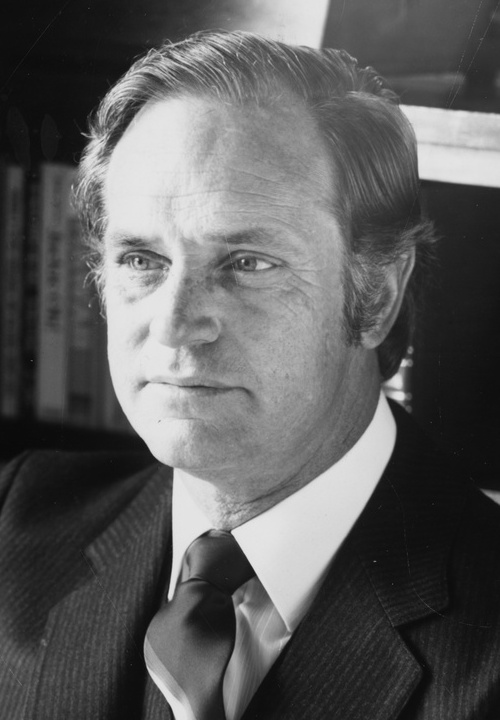

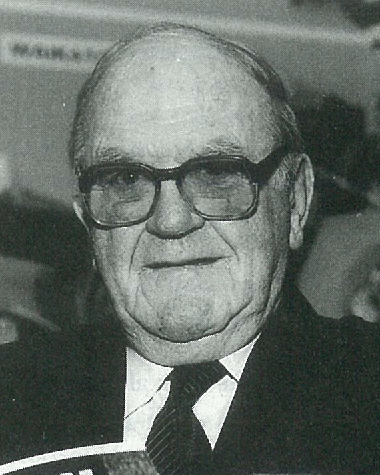
Candidate	Bruce Beetham	Jim Bull	JJ Stewart
Party	Social Credit	National	Labour
Popular vote	6,804	5,469	1,614
Percentage	48.03	38.61	11.39
Member before election
Sir Roy Jack
National
Elected Member
Bruce Beetham
Social Credit

The Rangitikei by-election of 1978 was a by-election in the New Zealand electorate of Rangitikei, a predominantly rural district in the middle of New Zealand's North Island. The by-election occurred on 18 February 1978, and was precipitated by the death of sitting National Party member of parliament Sir Roy Jack in December 1977.

== Background and candidates ==
The MP for Rangitikei, and Speaker of the House, Sir Roy Jack died in Wellington on 24 December 1977.

Labour

Four names were put forward for the Labour Party nomination:

- David Butler, a Wellington economist who was Labour's candidate for Stratford in 1966 and made unsuccessful bids in 1977 for nomination for the Wellington Central and Pahiatua electorates
- Hugh de Lacy, a Wellington agricultural journalist who formerly lived in the electorate and withdrew from contesting the nomination in Rangitikei in 1975
- Max Hodgson, a freezing worker who was chairman of the Feilding Ratepayers' Association
- JJ Stewart, a former All Black selector and coach who was then principal of Flock House, the Ministry of Agriculture's training institute, near Bulls

At a selection meeting held in Marton, Stewart won the candidacy. Stewart was a former teacher of Social Credit candidate Bruce Beetham's at New Plymouth Boys' High School who once gave him a caning.

National

National was hampered as its candidate selection was only to be a stand in until the general election later in the year. Jack had planned to retire then, to be replaced as the candidate by the Minister of Education Les Gandar whose Ruahine seat was to be abolished in boundary changes. A former member of Rangitikei, 72 year old Norman Shelton, aged 72, was tipped as a potential National candidate to "hold the fort" until the general election. Shelton said a candidature of himself had been neither sought nor confirmed though stating he would be "quite capable" of looking after the seat in a caretaker capacity. Shelton did not put himself forward, but three other people sought the National nomination:

- James Bull, a farmer and businessman from Rata who was chairman of the Rangitikei County Council and formerly a National Party dominion councillor
- A.J. Norris, a Mangamahu farmer who was vice-chairman of the Waitotara electorate committee and had unsuccessfully sought the Rangitikei nomination in 1975 as well as seeking the National nomination in the new Manawatu electorate for the 1978 election
- John Rowan, a Wanganui solicitor who had been National's candidate for Wanganui in 1975

Bull was selected as the candidate for the by-election after winning an absolute majority on the first ballot of the 117 delegates votes at the selection meeting held by Marton.

Social Credit

Beetham, who was the Social Credit Party's leader and recently retired Mayor of Hamilton, had polled a strong second in the seat in 1975. He was thought the obvious choice for the party in the by-election, but waited until after Jack's funeral before declaring his candidacy.

Others

Dr Denis Hocking, a Bulls farmer was announced as the Values Party candidate for the by-election. Hocking, who was the first declared party candidate, had a science degree from Massey University and a doctorate of philosophy gained in Britain. Since 1975 he had been farming his family property in Bulls and had also been the energy spokesman for the Friends of the Earth in New Zealand organisation.

M.J. Leniston of Wellington, stood as an independent and campaigned by asking people to come to see him instead of going out to talk to them. He did not have any particular policies, instead wanting people to "identify their own issues and put them forward." His 16 year old son paid the $100 deposit for his candidature for him.

== Results ==
The following table gives the election results:

1978 Rangitikei by-election
Party	Candidate	Votes	%	±%
Social Credit	Bruce Beetham	6,804	48.03	+11.64
National	Jim Bull	5,469	38.61	
Labour	JJ Stewart	1,614	11.39	
Values	Denis Hocking	264	1.68	
Independent	M J Leniston	13	0.09	
Majority		1,335	9.42	
Turnout		14,164	62.32	−21.07
Registered electors		22,725		
Social Credit gain from National		Swing		

The by-election was contested by all major parties. It was won by Bruce Beetham, the Social Credit Party candidate, with a majority of 1,335. He became the second Social Credit Party MP in New Zealand's history. This upset was extremely rare in the post-war political climate of New Zealand, especially in a rural electorate that traditionally voted National (although such voting is more likely in a by-election). The National Party candidate Jim Bull came second, the Labour Party candidate (and rugby coach) JJ Stewart came third and the Values Party candidate Denis Hocking came fourth.

Both Bull and Stewart declined to run in the seat again at the general election, with Max Hodgson being selected as Labour's candidate unopposed. At the general election Beetham was confirmed as the member, being elected with increased majority against Gandar for National, with Hodgson third and Hocking again coming fourth.

== See also ==
- Rangitikei by-election (disambiguation), other by-elections for the Rangitikei electorate
