= Margaret Shields =

New Zealand politician

The Honourable Dame Margaret Shields DNZM QSO JP
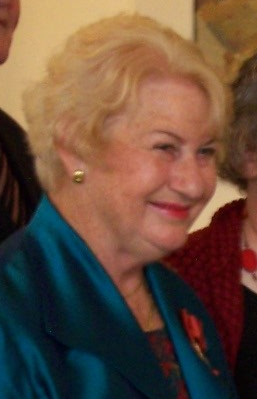
- Shields in 2008

Chair of the Wellington Regional Council
- In office 2001–2004
- Preceded by: Stuart Macaskill
- Succeeded by: Ian Buchanan

Deputy chair of the Wellington Regional Council
- In office 1998–2001
- Preceded by: Euan McQueen
- Succeeded by: Terry McDavitt

49th Minister of Customs
- In office 26 July 1984 – 24 August 1987
- Prime Minister: David Lange
- Preceded by: Keith Allen
- Succeeded by: Trevor de Cleene
- In office 14 December 1988 – 8 August 1989
- Prime Minister: David Lange
- Preceded by: Trevor de Cleene
- Succeeded by: Peter Neilson

1st Minister of Consumer Affairs
- In office 26 July 1984 – 2 November 1990
- Prime Minister: David Lange; Geoffrey Palmer; Mike Moore
- Succeeded by: Katherine O'Regan

2nd Minister of Women's Affairs
- In office 24 August 1987 – 2 November 1990
- Prime Minister: David Lange; Geoffrey Palmer; Mike Moore
- Preceded by: Ann Hercus
- Succeeded by: Jenny Shipley

Member of the New Zealand Parliament for Kapiti
- In office 28 November 1981 – 27 October 1990
- Preceded by: Barry Brill
- Succeeded by: Roger Sowry

Personal details
- Born: Margaret Kerslake Porter; 18 December 1941 Wellington, New Zealand
- Died: 29 May 2013 (aged 71) Paraparaumu, New Zealand
- Party: Labour
- Spouse: Pat Shields (m. 1960)
- Children: 2

Dame Margaret Kerslake Shields DNZM QSO JP (née Porter; 18 December 1941 – 29 May 2013) was a New Zealand politician of the Labour Party. She had three terms in the House of Representatives in the 1980s, and served as Minister of Consumer Affairs, Minister of Customs, and Minister of Women's Affairs during the Fourth Labour Government. Afterwards, she was a member of the Greater Wellington Regional Council, including a term as chair between 2001 and 2004.

== Early life ==
Shields was born on 18 December 1941 in Wellington, and was educated at Wellington Girls' College from 1955 to 1959.

In 1960, she married Patrick John Shields, and the couple went on to have two children.

Shields returned to study at Massey University in 1967, and then completed a Bachelor of Arts degree at Victoria University of Wellington, graduating in 1973. During that period, she was also a research officer at the Consumers' Institute between 1968 and 1971.

Shields campaigned for women's rights throughout her career. In 1966, she was one of a group of Wellington women (members of Newlands Playcentre) who founded the Society for Research on Women (SROW). She was a founding member of the Women's Electoral Lobby (WEL) in 1975 which aimed to get more women into parliament and public offices. She worked at the Department of Statistics from 1973 to 1981, and served on the Wellington Hospital Board from 1977 to 1980.

She was on the organising committee of the 1975 United Women's Convention, working alongside leading feminist organisers such as Sue Piper, Deirdre Milne and Ros Noonan.

== Political career ==
New Zealand Parliament
Years	Term	Electorate	Party
1981–1984	40th	Kapiti	Labour
1984–1987	41st	Kapiti	Labour
1987–1990	42nd	Kapiti	Labour

Shields first stood for Labour in the 1975 election in the Karori electorate, coming second to Hugh Templeton. Shields had initially been declared the winner of the 1978 election in the Kapiti electorate, but she lost by 83 votes on a magisterial recount to Barry Brill.

From the 1981 election she represented the Kapiti electorate in Parliament, but in the 1990 election she was defeated by Roger Sowry; one of a number of losses contributing to the fall of the Fourth Labour Government. In 1983 Shields was appointed as Labour's spokesperson for Science & Technology and Statistics by Labour leader David Lange. She was Minister of Customs and Consumer Affairs from 1984 and the Minister of Women's Affairs from 1987 to 1990.

== Post-parliamentary career ==
In 1990, she took up a position as director of INSTRAW, the United Nations International Research and Training Institute for the Advancement of Women, based in the Dominican Republic. She also held offices with the UN Development Fund for Women, the National Council of Women and the Federation of Graduate Women.

In 1995, Shields was elected to the Greater Wellington Regional Council. She became its deputy chairwoman in 1998, and was its first female chair from 2001 to 2004.

== Honours and awards ==
In 1990, Shields received the New Zealand 1990 Commemoration Medal. In 1993, she was awarded the New Zealand Suffrage Centennial Medal. In the 1996 Queen's Birthday Honours, she was appointed a Companion of the Queen's Service Order for public services, and later in the 2008 New Year Honours was appointed a Distinguished Companion of the New Zealand Order of Merit. In the 2009 Special Honours, Shields accepted redesignation as a Dame Companion, following the reintroduction of titular honours by the government.

== Death ==
Shields died in Paraparaumu in 2013 and was survived by her husband Pat and one of her two daughters.

Political offices
Preceded by Keith Allen	Minister of Customs; 1984–1987; 1988–1990	Succeeded by Trevor de Cleene
Preceded by Trevor de Cleene	Minister of Customs; 1984–1987; 1988–1990	Succeeded by Peter Neilson
New title	Minister of Consumer Affairs; 1984–1990	Succeeded by Katherine O'Regan
Preceded by Ann Hercus	Minister for Women's Affairs; 1987–1990	Succeeded by Jenny Shipley
Preceded by Stuart Macaskill	Chair of the Wellington Regional Council; 2001–2004	Succeeded by Ian Buchanan
New Zealand Parliament
Preceded by Barry Brill	Member of Parliament for Kapiti; 1981–1990	Succeeded by Roger Sowry
