= Ron Smith (peace activist) =

New Zealand public servant, communist and peace activist

Ronald Joseph Smith (2 May 1921 – 16 June 1995) was a notable New Zealand public servant, communist and peace activist.

He was born in Wellington, New Zealand, in 1921, and educated at Wellington College. He died in Wellington in 1995.

He stood unsuccessfully for the Communist Party for the Island Bay electorate in 1949, 1954, 1960, 1963, and 1966.

He wrote Working class son : my fight against capitalism and war : memoirs, which was published in 1994.
