= 1978 New Zealand general election =

General election in New Zealand

- 25 November 1978

92 seats in the Parliament 47 seats needed for a majority
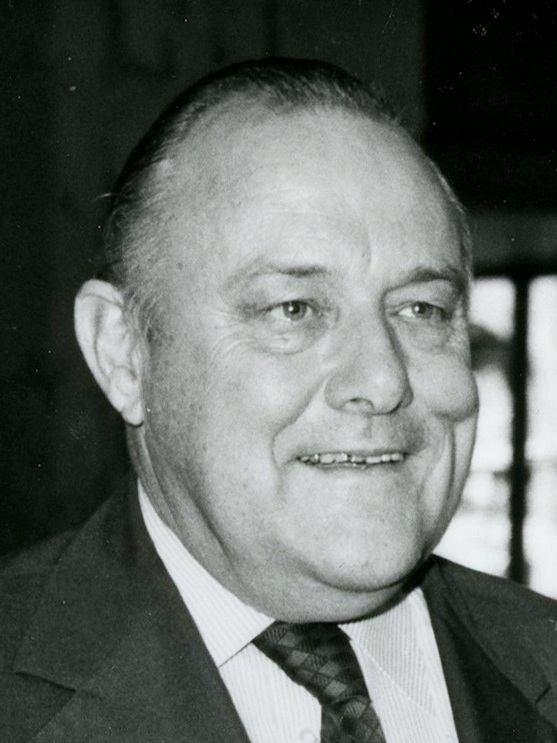

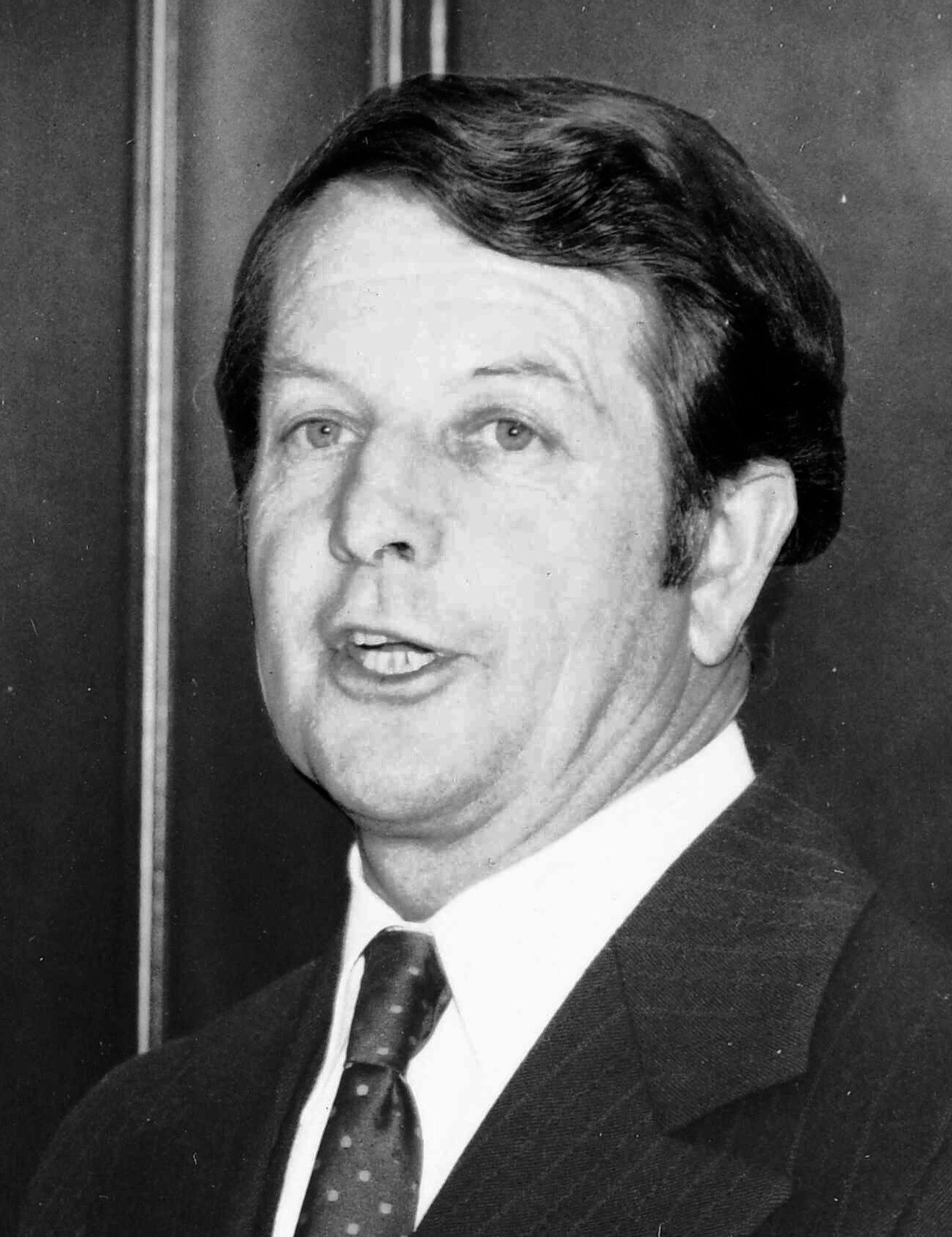

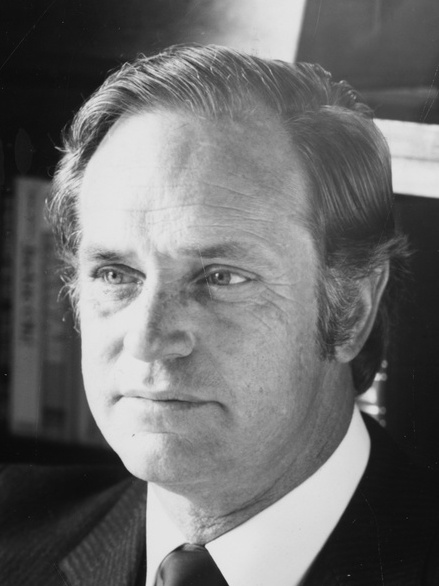
	First party	Second party	Third party
Leader	Robert Muldoon	Bill Rowling	Bruce Beetham
Party	National	Labour	Social Credit
Leader since	9 July 1974	6 September 1974	14 May 1972
Leader's seat	Tamaki	Tasman	Rangitīkei
Last election	55 seats, 47.6%	32 seats, 39.6%	0 seats, 7.4%
Seats before	54	32	1
Seats won	51	40	1
Seat change	▼3	▲8	Steady
Popular vote	680,991	691,076	274,756
Percentage	39.8%	40.4%	16.1%
Swing	▼7.8%	▲0.8%	▲8.7%
- Results by electorate, shaded by winning margin
Prime Minister before election
Robert Muldoon
National
Subsequent Prime Minister
Robert Muldoon
National

The 1978 New Zealand general election was a nationwide vote to elect the 39th New Zealand Parliament. It saw the governing National Party, led by Robert Muldoon, retain office, but the opposition Labour Party won the largest share of the vote. Reorganisation of the enrolment system caused major problems with the electoral rolls, which left a legacy of unreliable information about voting levels in this election.

== Background ==
The National Party had won a resounding victory in the 1975 elections, taking fifty-five of the eighty-seven seats and ousting the Labour Party from government. Labour had been led by Bill Rowling, who had assumed the post of Prime Minister on the death in office of the popular Norman Kirk. Labour won the remaining thirty-two seats in that election, with no other parties gaining entry to Parliament.

Labour's Rowling had been criticised by many for inadequately countering Muldoon's confrontational style, and was widely perceived as "weak". Following Labour's defeat, there had been speculation about replacing Rowling as leader of the party, but Rowling retained his position. Gradually, as some people wearied of Muldoon's style, Rowling's more reserved manner was held up as an asset rather than a weakness, and Labour began to gain a certain amount of traction again. Economic troubles hurt the government, and its reputation had fallen. Muldoon remained a powerful opponent, however, and was regarded as a strong campaigner.

Not long before the 1978 election, a by-election in Rangitikei caused considerable comment when it introduced a third party to Parliament: Bruce Beetham, leader of the Social Credit Party. Although other parties dismissed Social Credit's success as a fluke, Beetham predicted a great future for the party.

=== MPs retiring in 1978 ===
Five National MPs and three Labour MPs intended to retire at the end of the 38th Parliament.

Party	Name	Electorate	Term of office	Date announced
National	Peter Gordon	Clutha	1960–78	28 October 1977
National	Allan McCready	Manawatu	1960–78	8 August 1977
National	Ed Latter	Marlborough	1975–78	18 August 1978
National	Harry Lapwood	Rotorua	1960–78	18 August 1977
National	Ray La Varis	Taupo	1975–78	4 November 1977
Labour	Martyn Finlay	Henderson	1946–49; 1963–78	25 May 1977
Labour	Roger Drayton	St Albans	1969–78	8 September 1977
Labour	Paddy Blanchfield	West Coast	1960–78	16 July 1977

Sir Stanley Whitehead MP for Nelson had announced he would retire at the end of the term in 1978, due to ill-health, but he died on 9 January 1976 triggering a by-election instead.

== Opinion polling ==
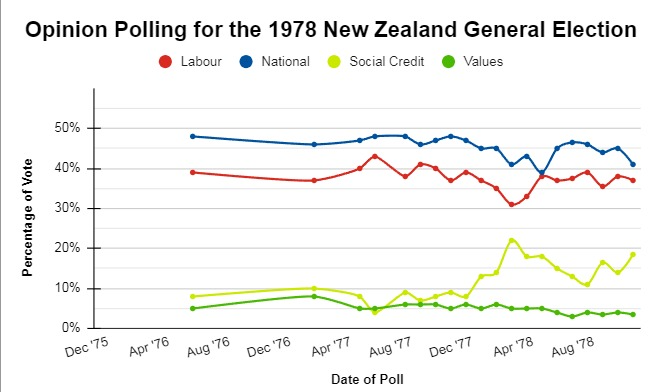

Poll	Date (Note: These are the survey dates of the poll, or if the survey dates are not stated, the date the poll was released.)	National	Labour	Socred	Values	Lead
1978 election result	25 Nov 1978	39.82	40.41	16.07	2.41	0.59
TVNZ Heylen	18 Nov 1978	38	39	20	4	1
NBR	1 Nov 1978	44	35	17	3	9
TVNZ Heylen	28 Oct 1978	45	38	14	3	7
TVNZ Heylen	30 Sep 1978	44	36	17	3	8
NBR	1 Sep 1978	44	35	16	4	9
TVNZ Heylen	15 Aug 1978	46	39	11	4	7
TVNZ Heylen	15 Jul 1978	46	39	12	3	7
NBR	1 Jul 1978	47	36	14	3	11
TVNZ Heylen	15 Jun 1978	45	37	15	4	8
TVNZ Heylen	15 May 1978	43	38	16	4	5
NBR	1 May 1978	40	37	16	4	3
TVNZ Heylen	15 Apr 1978	39	38	18	5	1
TVNZ Heylen	15 Mar 1978	43	33	18	5	10
NBR	1 Mar 1978	41	31	22	5	7
TVNZ Heylen	15 Feb 1978	45	35	14	6	7
NBR	1 Jan 1978	45	37	13	5	8
TVNZ Heylen	15 Dec 1977	47	39	8	6	8
NBR	1 Nov 1977	48	37	9	5	11
TVNZ Heylen	15 Oct 1977	47	40	8	6	7
TVNZ Heylen	15 Sep 1977	46	41	7	6	5
TVNZ Heylen	15 Aug 1977	48	38	9	6	10
TVNZ Heylen	15 Jun 1977	48	43	4	5	5
TVNZ Heylen	15 May 1977	47	40	8	5	7
TVNZ Heylen	15 Feb 1977	46	37	10	8	9
TVNZ Heylen	15 Jun 1976	48	39	8	5	9

== Electoral changes ==
=== Problems ===
In 1975 several reforms had been made to the electoral system. These included combining the re-enrolment process with the taking of the 1976 census and replacing existing Justice Department registrars with electorate officers appointed from Post Office Staff. They would work in conjunction with Statistics Department and Electoral Office staff, and at the same time, a switch would be made from a manual to a computerised system.

A report completed in 1979 found that there had been poor liaison between the various departments involved, staff shortages and problems with the computer system. However, the main problem arose from the decision to combine re-enrolment with the 1976 census. Many voters had been confused by the need to re-enrol only a year after the previous election, and many had not bothered to fill out their forms. Census staff had not been given the authority to insist on the card being completed.

To avoid disenfranchising a significant portion of the electorate, the Chief Electoral Officer decided just to carry forward many old voter registrations in the hope that duplications and outdated enrolments would be purged later. However, not enough staff were provided to complete that in time, and by the time that the rolls closed, 35,000 forms remained unprocessed.

It has been estimated that as many as 460,000 enrolments may have been outdated or duplicates. Many voters (even candidates) found themselves enrolled in the wrong electorate or off the roll completely, and others were enrolled in multiple electorates or several times in the same electorate. That means that accurate figures for electoral turnout are impossible to determine, and other figures may not be reliable.

=== Electoral redistribution ===
The 1977 electoral redistribution was the most overtly political since the Representation Commission had been established by an amendment to the Representation Act in 1886, initiated by Muldoon's National Government. That a large number of people failed to fill out an electoral re-registration card had little practical effect for the electoral redistribution for people on the general roll, but it transferred Māori to the general roll if the card was not handed in. Together with a northward shift of New Zealand's population, that resulted in five new electorates having to be created in the upper part of the North Island.

The electoral redistribution was very disruptive, and 22 electorates were abolished (see list below), and 27 electorates were newly created or re-established. In the North Island, fifteen electorates were newly created (Albany, East Cape, Eastern Hutt, Helensville, Horowhenua, Hunua, Kaimai, Matamata, Ōhāriu, Papakura, Papatoetoe, Pencarrow, Rangiriri, Tarawera, and Te Atatū) and six electorates were re-created (Bay of Islands, Kaipara, Taranaki, Waipa, Waitakere, and Waitotara). In the South Island, two electorates were newly created (Otago and Yaldhurst) and four electorates were re-created (Ashburton, Fendalton, Selwyn, and Waitaki). The changes came into effect for the 1978 election.

== The election ==
The election was held on 25 November. There were 2,489,510 people officially registered to vote in the elections, making the election the first one in which there were more than two million registered voters. However, the electoral roll in 1978 was significantly out of date and contained numerous duplicate entries. The cause of this confusion was a major redistribution of electoral boundaries, which had been implemented the year before. The actual number of potential voters is estimated to have been about 2,100,000, and actual turnout is estimated to have been about 80% (as compared to the official turnout of only 68.70%), slightly lower than the turnout for the previous election.

== Results ==
The 1978 election saw the National Party win fifty-one seats in parliament, a majority of several seats. This allowed it to retain power. The Labour Party won forty seats. The Social Credit Party retained the Rangitikei seat, which it had won in a by-election shortly before the election. No other parties won seats, and there were no successful independent candidates.

While National won a majority of seats in parliament, it did not actually win a majority of the vote. Labour received the highest number of votes, winning slightly more than forty percent. National, by contrast, won slightly less than forty percent. Social Credit, despite winning only one seat, actually received around sixteen percent of the vote. The election night result had National with more seats, but many seats had small majorities and it was conceivable that if special votes overturned enough electorates Labour could form a government. Ultimately this did not eventuate however.

While the Hunua electorate was initially won by Malcolm Douglas (Labour), the result was overturned by the High Court and Winston Peters (National) became the MP for Hunua.

== Detailed results ==
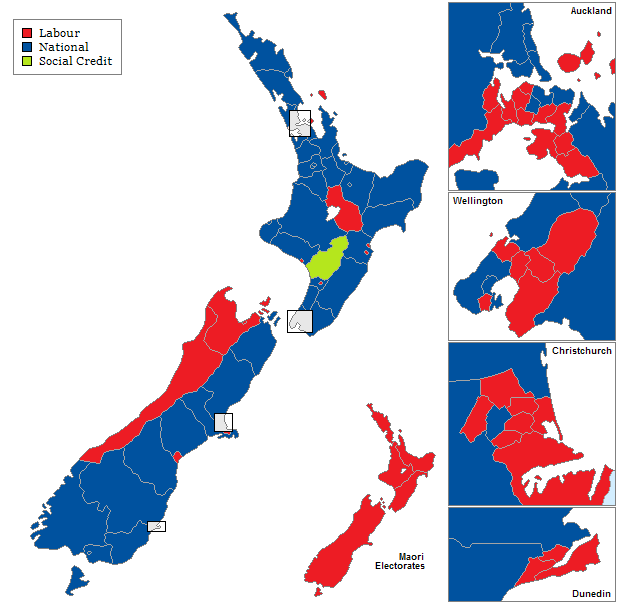

=== Party totals ===
Party	Candidates	Total votes	Percentage	Seats won	Change
National	92	680,991	39.82	51	-4
Labour	92	691,076	40.41	40	+8
Social Credit	92	274,756	16.07	1	+1
Values	92	41,220	2.41	0	±0
National Socialist	1	22	0.00	-	±0
Independent	53	22,130	1.29	0	±0
Total	421	1,710,173		92	+5

=== Votes summary ===
Popular Vote
Labour	40.41%
National	39.82%
Social Credit	16.07%
Values	2.41%
Independents	1.29%

Parliament seats
National	55.43%
Labour	43.48%
Social Credit	1.09%

== Results by electorate ==
The tables below shows the results of the 1978 general election:

Key

National Labour Social Credit

Electorate results for the 1978 New Zealand general election
Electorate	Incumbent	Winner	Majority	Runner up
General electorates
Albany	New electorate	Don McKinnon	1,159	David Rankin
Ashburton	New electorate	Rob Talbot	3.005	John Srhoy
Auckland Central	Richard Prebble		5,284	Maire Cole
Avon	Mary Batchelor		8,215	Tom George
Awarua	Rex Austin		1,450	Bill Devine
Bay of Islands	New electorate	Neill Austin	1,682	William Guy McPherson
Birkenhead	Jim McLay		2,534	Rex Stanton
Christchurch Central	Bruce Barclay		5,947	Gwen Clucas
Clutha	Peter Gordon	Robin Gray	1,427	F A O'Connell
Dunedin Central	Brian MacDonell		3,413	M B Ablett
Dunedin North	Richard Walls	Stan Rodger	2,850	Richard Walls
East Cape	New electorate	Duncan MacIntyre	2,533	O P Drabble
East Coast Bays	Frank Gill		1,566	Colleen Hicks
Eastern Hutt	New electorate	Trevor Young	5,373	Rosemary Young
Eden	Aussie Malcolm		648	John Hinchcliff
Fendalton	New electorate	Eric Holland	1,956	David Close
Gisborne	Bob Bell		213	Allan Wallbank
Hamilton East	Ian Shearer		1,361	Lois Welch
Hamilton West	Mike Minogue		1,006	Dorothy Jelicich
Hastings	Bob Fenton	David Butcher	334	Bob Fenton
Hauraki	New electorate	Leo Schultz	2,019	Gordon Miller
Hawkes Bay	Richard Harrison		1,908	Mike Cullen
Helensville	New electorate	Dail Jones	1,199	Jack Elder
Heretaunga	Ron Bailey		2,744	John Ward
Horowhenua	New electorate	Geoff Thompson	744	Alan Charles Eyles
Hunua	New electorate	Winston Peters	192	Malcolm Douglas (Note: The election of Malcolm Douglas in Hunua was overturned by the Electoral Court on 24 May 1979)
Invercargill	Norman Jones		256	Aubrey Begg
Island Bay	Gerald O'Brien	Frank O'Flynn	650	Bill Nathan (Note: Gerald O'Brien came third standing as Independent Labour)
Kaimai	New electorate	Bruce Townshend	3,476	Douglas Conway
Kaipara	New electorate	Peter Wilkinson	520	Nevern McConachy
Kapiti	Barry Brill		23	Margaret Shields (Note: Margaret Shields had initially been declared the winner but she lost 83 votes in a magisterial recount)
King Country	Jim Bolger		2,770	Leo Menefy
Lyttelton	Colleen Dewe	Ann Hercus	1,423	Colleen Dewe
Manawatu	Allan McCready	Michael Cox	2,913	Trevor de Cleene
Mangere	David Lange		6,263	Peter Saunders
Manurewa	Merv Wellington	Roger Douglas	2,467	Peter O'Brien
Marlborough	Ed Latter	Doug Kidd	323	Ian Brooks
Matamata	New electorate	Jack Luxton	4,407	David Mawdsley
Miramar	Bill Young		315	Bill Jeffries
Mt Albert	Warren Freer		2,861	Frank Ryan
Napier	Gordon Christie		2,927	Kevin Rose
Nelson	Mel Courtney		2,239	Peter Malone
New Lynn	Jonathan Hunt		4,390	Jacky Bridges
New Plymouth	Tony Friedlander		112	Dennis Duggan
North Shore	George Gair		4,650	Gene Leckey
Onehunga	Frank Rogers		1,417	Barrie Hutchinson
Ohariu	New electorate	Hugh Templeton	1,958	Helene Ritchie
Otago	New electorate	Warren Cooper	3,722	R J Rutherford
Otahuhu	Bob Tizard		4,762	Ray Ah Chee
Pahiatua	John Falloon		6,675	P M A Hills
Pakuranga	Gavin Downie	Pat Hunt	2,111	Elsa Smith
Palmerston North	John Lithgow	Joe Walding	2,736	John Lithgow
Papakura	New electorate	Merv Wellington	3,622	Geoff Braybrooke
Papanui	Bert Walker	Mike Moore	3,289	Bert Walker
Papatoetoe	New electorate	Eddie Isbey	1,511	Colin Bidois
Pencarrow	New electorate	Fraser Colman	3,649	Brett Newell
Porirua	Gerry Wall		3,657	Alan Perry
Rangiora	Derek Quigley		1,145	Don McKenzie
Rangiriri	New electorate	Bill Birch	2,276	Robert Frederick McKee
Rangitikei	Bruce Beetham		2,853	Les Gandar
Remuera	Allan Highet		5,771	Lee Goffin
Roskill	Arthur Faulkner		1,671	John Banks
Rotorua	Harry Lapwood	Paul East	1,020	Peter Tapsell
St Albans	Roger Drayton	David Caygill	3,679	Neil Russell
St Kilda	Bill Fraser		2,959	Graeme Laing
Selwyn	New electorate	Colin McLachlan	1,232	Bill Woods
Sydenham	John Kirk		7,040	Ian Wilson
Tamaki	Robert Muldoon		6,310	Audie Cooke-Pennefather
Taranaki	New electorate	David Thomson	4,573	K A Tracey
Tarawera	New electorate	Ian Mclean	2,022	JJ Stewart
Tasman	Bill Rowling		1,794	Ruth Richardson
Taupo	Ray La Varis	Jack Ridley	609	Lesley A. Miller
Tauranga	Keith Allen		3,318	Paul Hills
Te Atatu	Michael Bassett		2,819	W R Cross
Timaru	Sir Basil Arthur		2,183	Bill Penno
Waikato	Lance Adams-Schneider		5,063	Brian West
Waipa	New electorate	Marilyn Waring	4,906	John Kilbride
Wairarapa	Ben Couch		837	Allan Levett
Waitakere	New electorate	Ralph Maxwell	2,016	Bill Haresnape
Waitaki	New electorate	Jonathan Elworthy	1,315	Bill Laney
Waitotara	New electorate	Venn Young	4,109	Edith Charteris
Wallace	Brian Talboys		5,324	Jim Thomson
Wanganui	Russell Marshall		3,102	John Rowan
Wellington Central	Ken Comber		916	Neville Pickering
West Coast	Paddy Blanchfield	Kerry Burke	5,647	George Ferguson
Western Hutt	Bill Lambert	John Terris	168	Bill Lambert
Whangarei	John Elliott		1,176	Colin Moyle
Yaldhurst	New electorate	Mick Connelly	1,638	David Watson
Māori electorates
Eastern Maori	Paraone Reweti		7,400	Monty Searancke
Northern Maori	Matiu Rata		4,844	Joe Toia
Southern Maori	Whetu Tirikatene-Sullivan		9,180	Charles Piharo Maitai
Western Maori	Koro Wētere		9,719	Gordon Pihema

Table footnotes:

=== Map ===
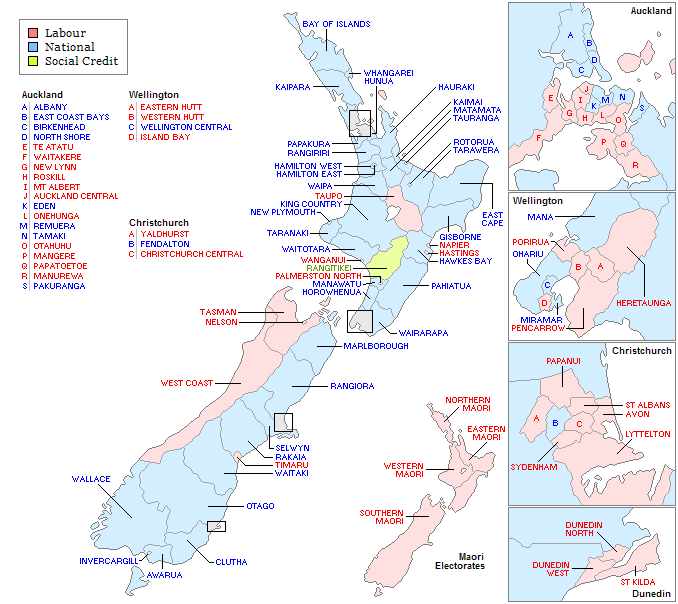

=== Summary of changes ===
For details about the winners of each individual electorate, see the article on the 39th Parliament.

- Electoral redistributions:
  - A major reconfiguration of electorates and their boundaries occurred in 1977. This resulted in twenty-two electorates being dissolved and twenty-seven new electorates being formed (a net gain of five electorates).
  - The seats of Bay of Plenty, Coromandel, Egmont, Franklin, Grey Lynn, Henderson, Hobson, Hutt, Karori, Manukau, Oamaru, Petone, Piako, Raglan, Rakaia, Riccarton, Rodney, Ruahine, South Canterbury, Stratford, Waitemata, and Wigram ceased to exist.
  - The seats of Albany, Ashburton, Bay of Islands, East Cape, Eastern Hutt, Fendalton, Hauraki, Helensville, Horowhenua, Hunua, Kaimai, Kaipara, Matamata, Ohariu, Papakura, Papatoetoe, Pencarrow, Rangiriri, Selwyn, Taranaki, Tarawera, Te Atatu, Waipa, Waitakere, Waitaki, Waitotara, and Yaldhurst came into being.
- Seats captured:
  - By Labour: Hastings, Lyttelton, Manurewa, Palmerston North, Papanui, Taupo, and Western Hutt were captured from National.
  - By National: None
  - By Social Credit: None
- Seats transferred from departing MPs to new MPs:
  - The seats of Clutha, Manawatu, Marlborough, Pakuranga, and Rotorua, all held by departing National MPs, were won by new National candidates.
  - The seats of Dunedin North, Island Bay, St Albans, and West Coast, all held by departing Labour MPs, were won by new Labour candidates.
