= Gerald O'Brien =

New Zealand politician

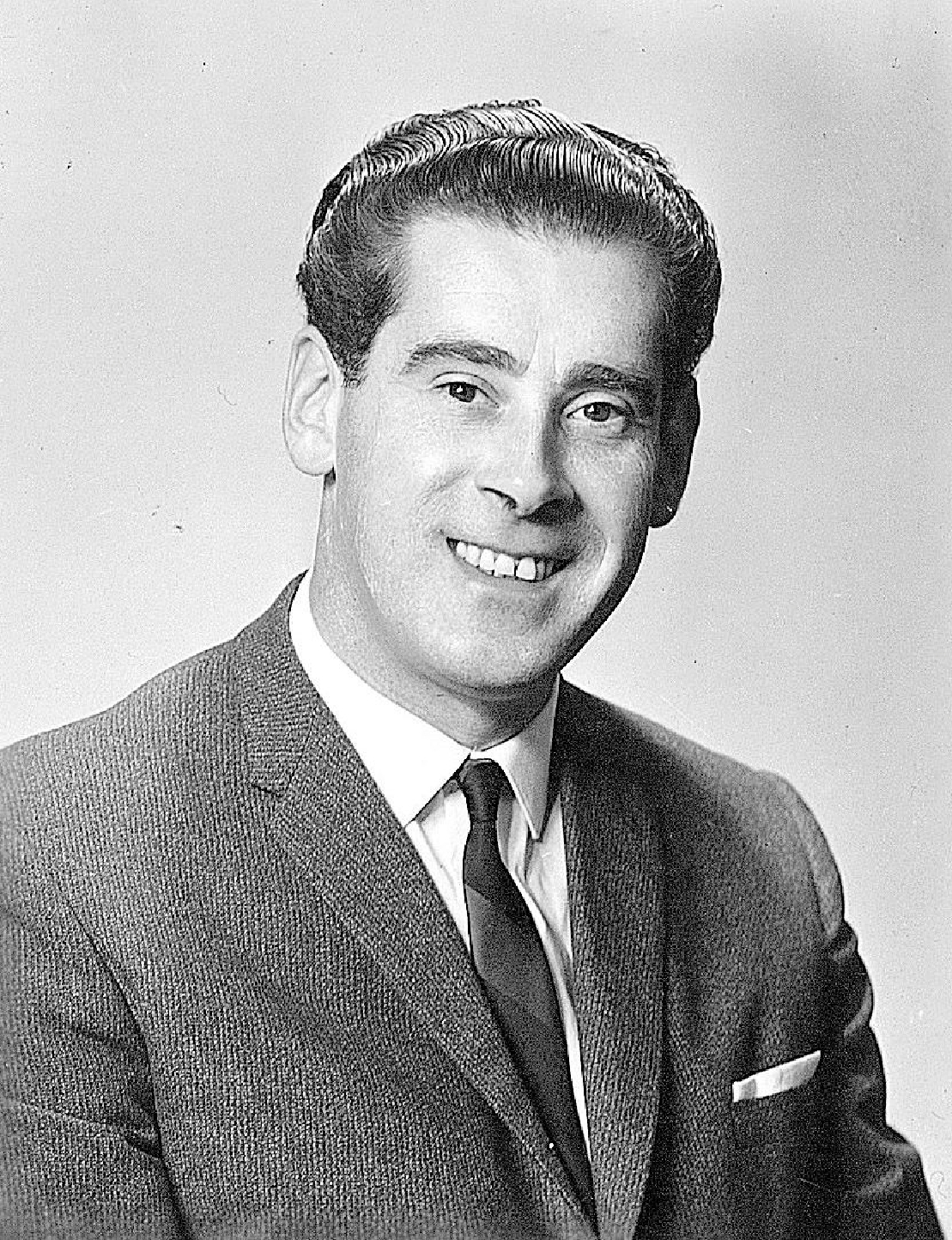
- O'Brien in 1965

Member of the New Zealand Parliament for Island Bay
- In office 29 November 1969 – 25 November 1978
- Preceded by: Arnold Nordmeyer
- Succeeded by: Frank O'Flynn

Wellington City Councillor
- In office 9 October 1965 – 9 October 1971

Personal details
- Born: John Gerald O'Brien; 2 December 1924 Wellington, New Zealand
- Died: 13 December 2017 (aged 93) Wellington, New Zealand
- Party: Labour
- Spouse: Fausta O'Brien (m. 1956)
- Relations: Brian O'Brien (brother)
- Profession: Company director
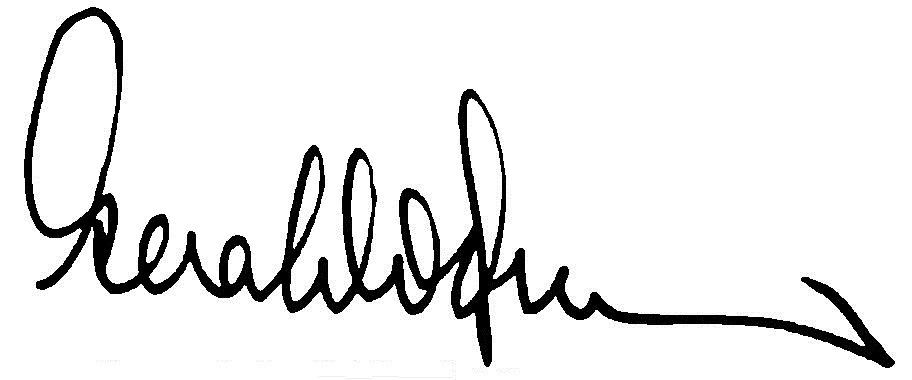
- Signature

Military service
- Allegiance: RNZAF
- Years of service: 1942–46
- Battles/wars: World War II

John Gerald O’Brien (2 December 1924 – 13 December 2017) was a New Zealand politician of the Labour Party.

== Early life ==
O'Brien was born in Wellington on 2 December 1924, the son of John Thomas O'Brien, and was educated at St Patrick's College. He joined the Royal New Zealand Air Force (RNZAF) in 1942 when he was 17 and trained as a radar operator in Harewood and Wigram. He did not see overseas' service as the Americans "had enough manpower in [that] area".

In 1956, O'Brien married Fausta Filipidis.

O'Brien owned and operated his own business Enzart Import Ltd. which exported locally manufactured products overseas. He was also a member of the Brooklyn Progressive Association and Brooklyn Community Association.

== Political career ==
New Zealand Parliament
Years	Term	Electorate	Party
1969–1972	36th	Island Bay	Labour
1972–1975	37th	Island Bay	Labour
1975–1978	38th	Island Bay	Labour

He joined the Labour Party and in 1946 he became the Brooklyn electorate secretary, the seat represented by Prime Minister Peter Fraser, and later became chairman. In 1963 he became the secretary of the Wellington Labour Representation Committee.

In 1950 he suggested to Frank Kitts that he should stand on behalf of Labour for the mayor and council; Kitts was the highest-polling councillor, although he did not win the mayoralty until 1956. O'Brien stood as a Labour candidate for the council himself in both 1959 and 1962 but was unsuccessful. In 1962 and again in 1965 he stood unsuccessfully for the Wellington Harbour Board on the Labour Party ticket. In 1965 he was elected as a member of the Wellington City Council and re-elected in 1968. On the council he was deputy chair of the city's works department. During this period O'Brien was approached to stand for Labour in the 1967 Petone by-election. He declined the invitation however, citing the demands of running his business would be incompatible with a parliamentary candidature at that time.

He represented the Island Bay electorate from 1969 to 1978. Following his election to Parliament O'Brien did not stand for re-election to the city council and his brother Brian (a sports journalist) replaced him on the Labour ticket. Brian O'Brien was elected in 1971 and served as a councillor until 1980 when he retired.

O'Brien was particularly opposed to the Vietnam War and was honoured by the Vietnamese in appreciation. He went as far as to use his importing business to bring goods from Vietnam into New Zealand, directly defying the policy of the Holyoake government. In 1974 O'Brien was elected as Vice-President of the Labour Party. As vice-president, he sat on the panel assembled to choose the successor to Norman Kirk in the Sydenham electorate. Initially the three electorate representatives wanted John Kirk, and the three head office nominees wanted the party secretary John Wybrow. O'Brien switched his vote to John Kirk, who got the nod. He was also on the committee that chose David Lange at the 1977 Mangere by-election. In January 1976 he was appointed by Labour leader Bill Rowling as Shadow Minister of Local Government.

He was charged over an incident in 1976 in Christchurch, where he allegedly asked two boys back to his motel room for a drink. The charges were thrown out, and O'Brien maintained that it was nothing but an attempt by political enemies to "get rid of me". He also stated that he got more sympathy from members of the National Party than from his own party. He was subsequently deselected by Labour for the Island Bay electorate. In 1978, he was defeated as an Independent Labour candidate. He ran against the official Labour candidate, Frank O'Flynn, and received some 3,700 votes at O'Flynn's expense, almost costing O'Flynn what had always been a Labour bastion.

O'Brien reaffirmed his rift with Labour at the 1979 Christchurch Central by-election where he endorsed the Social Credit candidate Terry Heffernan. At the 1981 election, the Social Credit Party invited him to stand for his old Island Bay electorate, but he declined.

== Honours and awards ==
O'Brien received several honours from the Polish government: in 1960, he was awarded the Silver Cross of Merit by the Polish government in 1960; in 1970, he received the Commander's Cross of the Order of Polonia Resituta; and in 1979 he was promoted to Commander's Cross with Star in the same order.

In 1977, O'Brien received the Queen Elizabeth II Silver Jubilee Medal, and in 1990 he was awarded the New Zealand 1990 Commemoration Medal.

== Death and legacy ==
O'Brien died in Wellington on 13 December 2017. He was survived by his wife of 61 years.

After O'Brien's death, his nephew Lucien Rizos organised O'Brien's possessions and discovered a complex series of illustrations depicting an imaginary world and its residents – including cut-out illustrations of more than 700 original-named characters and their fictional island homelands. The dates marked on these indicated they had been created by O'Brien over a series of decades. Rizos told The Guardian: "I talked to him for a year … about all sorts of things, but [the imaginary world] never came up and it pisses me off that I didn't know", he says. "He didn’t say – knowing he was dying – 'you're going to find this'." Rizos scanned these findings during the 2020 COVID-19 lockdown, and published them in a catalogue titled “Everything", the contents of which were exhibited at the Adam Art Gallery in October 2022.

== Notes ==
New Zealand Parliament
Preceded by Arnold Nordmeyer	Member of Parliament for Island Bay; 1969–1978	Succeeded by Frank O'Flynn
Party political offices
Preceded by Eddie Isbey	Vice-President of the New Zealand Labour Party; 1974–1977	Succeeded by Joe Walding
