= Island Bay (electorate) =

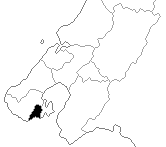
Island Bay electorate boundaries between 1993 and 1996

Island Bay was a former New Zealand electorate, centred on Island Bay in the southern suburbs of Wellington. The electorate was formed in 1946 and dissolved in 1996.

== Population centres ==
The 1941 New Zealand census had been postponed due to World War II, so the 1946 electoral redistribution had to take ten years of population growth and movements into account. The North Island gained a further two electorates from the South Island due to faster population growth. The abolition of the country quota through the Electoral Amendment Act, 1945 reduced the number and increased the size of rural electorates. None of the existing electorates remained unchanged, 27 electorates were abolished, eight former electorates were re-established, and 19 electorates were created for the first time, including Island Bay. The 1946 boundary of the electorate was as follows:

All that area bounded by a line commencing at a point on the high-water mark of Cook Strait at the south-eastern corner of Section 37, Terawhiti District, in Block XIII, Port Nicholson Survey District; thence northerly along the eastern boundaries of Section 37 aforesaid, and Section 38, Terawhiti District, to and along the eastern and northern boundaries of Section 70, Terawhiti District, and the northern boundary of Section 69, Terawhiti District, to the southernmost point of the Wellington Water-supply Reserve; thence along the eastern boundary of the said reserve to a point in line with the middle of a road reserve forming the northern boundaries of Lots 1, 5, 9, 13, and 17 of Section 14, Ohiro District; thence to and along the middle of the said road reserve, across Happy Valley Road, and along the middle of Borlase Street, Clarence Street, Mornington Road, Veronica Street, Raleigh Street, Mana Street, Krull Street, Moffitt Street, Short Street, Liardet Street, Dransfield Street, Finnimore Terrace, and Hutchison Road to a point due west of the middle of the western end of Hall Street; thence along a right line due east to the middle of Hall Street; thence along the middle of Hall Street and Mein Street and along the production of the middle-line of the last-mentioned street to the middle of Alexandra Road; thence along the middle of Alexandra Road and Crawford Road to a point in line with the eastern boundary of the Town Belt Reserve; thence southerly along the eastern boundary of the said Town Belt Reserve to a point in line with the middle of Carlton Street; thence to and along the middle of Carlton Street and Sutherland Road to a point in line with the middle-line of Lot 38, Block IV, as shown on the plan numbered 1889, deposited in the office of the District Land Registrar at Wellington; thence to and along the middle-line of that lot, and along the middle of Queen's Drive and its production to the high-water mark of Lyall Bay; thence westerly generally along the high-water mark of Cook Strait to the south-eastern corner of Section 37, Terawhiti District, the point of commencement; and including all adjacent islands.

== History ==
The electorate was held by five MPs from the Labour Party for the whole of its existence from 1946 to 1996. Robert McKeen was the first representative; he had since the 1922 election represented the Wellington South electorate. McKeen was the Speaker of the House of Representatives from 1947 to 1950. He retired from Parliament in 1954.

McKeen was succeeded by Arnold Nordmeyer in the 1954 election. Nordmeyer was Minister of Finance in the Second Labour Government from 1957 to 1960, and is remembered for the black budget which contributed to Labour's defeat in 1960. Nordmeyer had moved to the Island Bay electorate when the Brooklyn electorate was abolished.

Gerald O'Brien was deselected by Labour for the electorate in 1978, and ran against the new Labour candidate Frank O'Flynn. O'Flynn was Minister of Defence in the Fourth Labour Government from 1984 to 1987.

=== Members of Parliament ===
Key

Labour

Elections	Winner
1946 election	Robert McKeen
1949 election	Robert McKeen
1951 election	Robert McKeen
1954 election	Arnold Nordmeyer
1957 election	Arnold Nordmeyer
1960 election	Arnold Nordmeyer
1963 election	Arnold Nordmeyer
1966 election	Arnold Nordmeyer
1969 election	Gerald O'Brien
1972 election	Gerald O'Brien
1975 election	Gerald O'Brien
1978 election	Frank O'Flynn
1981 election	Frank O'Flynn
1984 election	Frank O'Flynn
1987 election	Elizabeth Tennet
1990 election	Elizabeth Tennet
1993 election	Elizabeth Tennet
(Electorate abolished in 1996; see Rongotai)

== Election results ==
=== 1993 election ===
1993 general election: Island Bay
Party	Candidate	Votes	%	±%
Labour	Elizabeth Tennet	10,110	49.02	+0.87
National	Chris Shields	4,688	22.73	
Alliance	Vernon Tile	3,809	18.47	
NZ First	Paul Douche	926	4.49	+3.94
Christian Heritage	Brian Fleming	479	2.32	
McGillicuddy Serious	Samuel Buchanan	451	2.18	
Natural Law	Bruce Brown	158	0.76	
Majority		5,422	26.29	+6.92
Turnout		20,621	84.45	+2.59
Registered electors		24,417		

=== 1990 election ===
1990 general election: Island Bay
Party	Candidate	Votes	%	±%
Labour	Elizabeth Tennet	9,034	48.15	−16.19
National	Ann Nolan	5,399	28.77	
Green	Gillian Hope	2,343	12.48	
NewLabour	Dallas Moore	1,342	7.15	
McGillicuddy Serious	C H Smith	205	1.09	
Independent	Ian Bartram	125	0.66	−1.47
People's Party	Warwick Taylor	115	0.61	
Social Credit	Paul Douche	104	0.55	
Independent	R J C Gilberd	37	0.19	
Majority		3,635	19.37	−18.45
Turnout		18,761	81.86	−3.23
Registered electors		22,918		

=== 1987 election ===
1987 general election: Island Bay
Party	Candidate	Votes	%	±%
Labour	Elizabeth Tennet	12,439	64.34	
National	Sandra Clarke	5,126	26.51	
Democrats	E H Low	503	2.60	
Independent	Ian Bartram	413	2.13	
People's Party	Christopher Ellis	408	2.11	
McGillicuddy Serious	Katerina Jane Julian	214	1.10	
NZ Party	G T Parker	121	0.62	
Imperial British Conservative	K J Quinn	109	0.56	
Majority		7,313	37.82	
Turnout		19,333	85.09	−5.94
Registered electors		22,719		

=== 1984 election ===
1984 general election: Island Bay
Party	Candidate	Votes	%	±%
Labour	Frank O'Flynn	10,495	52.95	+0.04
National	John Kananghinis	4,488	22.64	
NZ Party	Peter Button	4,048	20.42	
Social Credit	Paul Douche	477	2.40	
Values	Bruce Symondson	220	1.11	
Independent	Bill Maung	89	0.44	
Majority		6,007	30.31	+8.88
Turnout		19,817	91.03	+3.67
Registered electors		21,768		

=== 1981 election ===
1981 general election: Island Bay
Party	Candidate	Votes	%	±%
Labour	Frank O'Flynn	9,723	52.91	+17.51
National	Doug Catley	5,785	31.48	
Social Credit	Ron England	2,747	14.94	
Private Enterprise	Frank Moncur	120	0.65	+0.60
Majority		3,938	21.43	+17.91
Turnout		18,375	87.36	+30.56
Registered electors		21,032		

=== 1978 election ===
1978 general election: Island Bay
Party	Candidate	Votes	%	±%
Labour	Frank O'Flynn	6,524	35.40	
National	Bill Nathan	5,874	31.88	−8.73
Independent Labour	Gerald O'Brien	3,632	19.71	−28.63
Social Credit	Robyn Smith	1,502	8.15	
Values	Raewyn Good	751	4.07	
Independent	J C Bailey	65	0.35	
Socialist Action	Pat Starkey	33	0.17	
Tory	Tony Catford	21	0.11	
Independent National	Frank Moncur	12	0.06	−0.09
Independent	Robert Williamson	11	0.05	
Majority		650	3.52	
Turnout		18,425	56.80	−19.85
Registered electors		32,433		

=== 1975 election ===
1975 general election: Island Bay
Party	Candidate	Votes	%	±%
Labour	Gerald O'Brien	7,964	48.34	−7.13
National	Bill Nathan	6,690	40.61	
Values	Peter Rutherford	1,065	4.46	
Social Credit	Tom McLean	675	4.09	
Socialist Action	Kay Goodger	44	0.26	
Feminist	Ron Megget	29	0.17	
Independent National	Frank Moncur	26	0.15	−0.14
Majority		1,274	7.73	−15.48
Turnout		16,473	76.65	−11.98
Registered electors		21,489		

=== 1972 election ===
1972 general election: Island Bay
Party	Candidate	Votes	%	±%
Labour	Gerald O'Brien	8,352	55.47	+5.08
National	Bruce Farland	4,857	32.25	
Values	Tony Brunt	1,148	7.62	
Social Credit	Colin Whitmill	559	3.71	−0.61
New Democratic	Donald McMillan	95	0.63	
Independent National	Frank Moncur	45	0.29	
Majority		3,495	23.21	+14.00
Turnout		15,056	88.63	+4.14
Registered electors		16,986		

=== 1969 election ===
1969 general election: Island Bay
Party	Candidate	Votes	%	±%
Labour	Gerald O'Brien	7,374	50.39	
National	Fairlie Curry	6,026	41.18	
Social Credit	Colin Whitmill	633	4.32	
Independent	Fay Lambert	598	4.08	
Majority		1,348	9.21	
Turnout		14,631	84.49	−5.60
Registered electors		17,316		

=== 1966 election ===
1966 general election: Island Bay
Party	Candidate	Votes	%	±%
Labour	Arnold Nordmeyer	7,267	53.71	−1.25
National	Saul Goldsmith	4,461	32.97	
Social Credit	K A Marshall	1,487	10.99	
Democratic	John Albert Cameron	174	1.28	−3.38
Communist	Ron Smith	139	1.02	−0.05
Majority		2,806	20.74	+5.07
Turnout		13,528	78.89	−8.54
Registered electors		17,147		

=== 1963 election ===
1963 general election: Island Bay
Party	Candidate	Votes	%	±%
Labour	Arnold Nordmeyer	8,372	54.96	+1.70
National	Fairlie Curry	5,984	39.28	−1.19
Social Credit	John Albert Cameron	711	4.66	−0.68
Communist	Ron Smith	164	1.07	+0.16
Majority		2,388	15.67	+2.88
Turnout		15,231	87.43	+1.47
Registered electors		17,419		

=== 1960 election ===
1960 general election: Island Bay
Party	Candidate	Votes	%	±%
Labour	Arnold Nordmeyer	7,459	53.26	−7.90
National	Fairlie Curry	5,668	40.47	
Social Credit	John Albert Cameron	748	5.34	
Communist	Ron Smith	128	0.91	
Majority		1,791	12.79	−14.69
Turnout		14,003	85.96	−5.24
Registered electors		16,290		

=== 1957 election ===
1957 general election: Island Bay
Party	Candidate	Votes	%	±%
Labour	Arnold Nordmeyer	9,368	61.16	+2.68
National	Saul Goldsmith	5,159	33.68	
Social Credit	Eric Elliott	683	4.45	
Communist	Ray Nunes	105	0.68	
Majority		4,209	27.48	+1.46
Turnout		15,315	91.20	+3.91
Registered electors		16,792		

=== 1954 election ===
1954 general election: Island Bay
Party	Candidate	Votes	%	±%
Labour	Arnold Nordmeyer	8,594	58.48	
National	John Maurice Whitta	5,159	35.10	
Social Credit	Daniel Gardiner	821	5.58	
Communist	Ron Smith	120	0.81	
Majority		3,824	26.02	
Turnout		14,694	87.29	−1.37
Registered electors		16,833		

=== 1951 election ===
1951 general election: Island Bay
Party	Candidate	Votes	%	±%
Labour	Robert McKeen	6,735	56.64	−4.06
National	J E Duncan	5,055	42.51	
Communist	Connie Birchfield	99	0.83	
Majority		1,680	14.13	−8.79
Turnout		11,889	85.92	−2.82
Registered electors		13,837		

=== 1949 election ===
1949 general election: Island Bay
Party	Candidate	Votes	%	±%
Labour	Robert McKeen	7,335	60.70	−3.24
National	Herbert Edward Childs	4,565	37.78	+4.38
Communist	Ron Smith	184	1.52	
Informal votes		86	0.71	
Majority		2,770	22.92	−7.60
Turnout		12,170	88.74	−0.63
Registered electors		13,714		

=== 1946 election ===
1946 general election: Island Bay
Party	Candidate	Votes	%	±%
Labour	Robert McKeen	8,290	63.94	
National	Herbert Edward Childs	4,332	33.40	
Communist	Brian Berg	345	2.66	
Majority		3,958	30.52	
Turnout		12,967	89.37	
Registered electors		14,509		
