= Ann Hercus =

New Zealand politician and diplomat

The Honourable Dame Ann Hercus DCMG
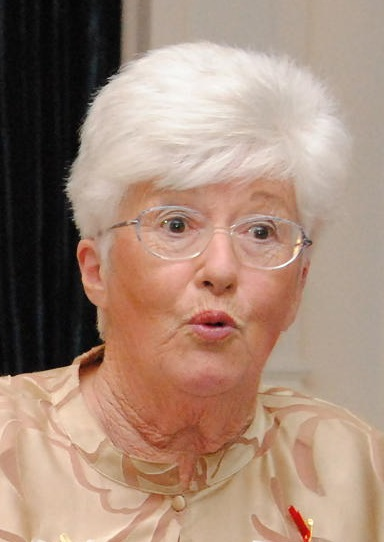
- Hercus in 2013

17th Minister for Social Welfare
- In office 26 July 1984 – 24 August 1987
- Prime Minister: David Lange
- Preceded by: Venn Young
- Succeeded by: Michael Cullen

25th Minister of Police
- In office 26 July 1984 – 24 August 1987
- Prime Minister: David Lange
- Preceded by: Ben Couch
- Succeeded by: Peter Tapsell

1st Minister for Women's Affairs
- In office 26 July 1984 – 24 August 1987
- Prime Minister: David Lange
- Succeeded by: Margaret Shields

Member of the New Zealand Parliament for Lyttelton
- In office 25 November 1978 – 15 August 1987
- Preceded by: Colleen Dewe
- Succeeded by: Peter Simpson

Personal details
- Born: Margaret Ann Sayers; 24 February 1942 (age 84) Hamilton, New Zealand
- Party: Labour
- Spouse: John Hercus
- Children: 2 sons

Dame Margaret Ann Hercus DCMG (née Sayers; born 24 February 1942), best known as Ann Hercus, is a New Zealand diplomat, politician and member of the Labour Party. She represented the Lyttelton electorate from 1978 to 1987.

== Life before politics ==
Her parents were Horace and Mary (née Ryan) Sayers. Hercus earned a Bachelor of Arts degree in English literature from the University of Auckland and a law degree from the University of Canterbury.

When Warren Freer, the Minister of Trade and Industry in the Third Labour Government, wanted a woman rather than the men proposed by the department for appointment to the Price Tribunal in 1973, Hercus was recommended by Tom McGuigan. Her ability impressed Freer, so he later appointed her to the Commerce Commission and his successor Lance Adams-Schneider made her the deputy chairman.

== Member of Parliament ==
New Zealand Parliament
Years	Term	Electorate	Party
1978–1981	39th	Lyttelton	Labour
1981–1984	40th	Lyttelton	Labour
1984–1987	41st	Lyttelton	Labour

Hercus stood as the Labour candidate for Lyttelton in the 1978 election and was elected, defeating the incumbent Colleen Dewe. She was re-elected in 1981 and 1984.

In 1983 Hercus stood for the deputy leadership of the party. In a three-way contest, in which all candidates were from Christchurch to reflect geographical proportionality, Hercus finished third. Papanui MP Mike Moore had led on the first ballot, but after Hercus was eliminated almost all of her supporters voted for Christchurch Central MP Geoffrey Palmer, who won. She was subsequently appointed as Labour's spokesperson for Social Welfare, Consumer Affairs and Women's Affairs by Labour leader David Lange.

When Fourth Labour Government was formed in 1984, Hercus was appointed the Minister of Social Welfare, Minister of Police and Women's Affairs. She was the first Minister for Women's Affairs, and also the first woman to hold the Police portfolio.

On 3 November 1984 Hercus was assaulted after speaking to a women's forum at Hagley High School hall by Hikurangi Nihoniho, a 50 year old driver. Nihoniho was angry at Hercus' statements supporting abortion and struck her in the chest as she was attempting to leave which Hercus said left her feeling "felled like a log". Nihoniho was found guilty of assault and fined $200. Hercus is one of the few New Zealand MPs to have been injured in a politically motivated attack.

Hercus did not stand for re-election in the 1987 election, and was succeeded in her Lyttelton seat by the Labour candidate Peter Simpson.

== Post-parliamentary career ==
In the 1988 New Year Honours, Hercus was appointed a Dame Commander of the Order of St Michael and St George, for public services. She then served as Ambassador and Permanent Representative of New Zealand to the United Nations from 1988 to 1990. In 1993, Hercus was awarded the New Zealand Suffrage Centennial Medal. In 1998, she was appointed Deputy Special Representative and Chief of Mission of the United Nations operation in Cyprus; at the time of her appointment she had been working as a special advisor to the United Nations.

After one year as Deputy Special Representative, she was promoted to Special Representative. In this role, she had been attempting to arrange direct negotiations between Turkish Cypriot leader Rauf Denktas and Greek Cypriot President Glafcos Clerides; however, after a month in this role she resigned for family reasons and returned to New Zealand. She subsequently served as a member of the UN Secretary General's Eminent Persons Panel on Peacekeeping Operations in 2000.

Hercus has served on a wide range of NGO Boards and Boards of State Owned Enterprises. These included the New Zealand Women's Refuge Foundation 1996–98, the New Zealand Richmond Fellowship 2005–07, the Board of the Theatre Royal Charitable Foundation 2005-08 and the Residual Health Management Unit later renamed the Crown Health Financing Agency.

In 2002, Hercus was appointed by the Minister of Broadcasting Marian Hobbs to the board of Television New Zealand. She resigned this position in December 2004, following her decision as a member of the Board's Remuneration Committee to decline to support the majority decision of this committee and subsequently the Board that “they would reluctantly have to concur" with the 50% increase in salary to $800,000 offered by CEO Ian Fraser to newsreader Judy Bailey.

She was persuaded to remain on the Board by the Minister. A year later on 8 December 2005, she formally resigned from the Board of TVNZ. The day this resignation was announced on 14 December 2005, was coincidentally within hours of former CEO Ian Fraser appearing before a Parliamentary Inquiry into Television New Zealand Ltd by Parliament's Finance and Expenditure Committee.

Hercus was the fundraiser for 'Save our Arts Centre' (SOAC), an organisation opposing the development of a new building for the School of Music for the University of Canterbury at the Arts Centre. Resource consent hearings before independent Commissioners denied this resource consent and the plans lapsed. The University's School of Music and Department of Classics has moved 8 years later into the heritage Chemistry Building at the Arts Centre.

Hercus now resides in Christchurch.

New Zealand Parliament
Preceded by Colleen Dewe	Member of Parliament for Lyttelton; 1978–1987	Succeeded by Peter Simpson
Party political offices
Preceded by Venn Young	Minister for Social Welfare; 1984–1987	Succeeded by Michael Cullen
Preceded by Ben Couch	Minister of Police; 1984–1987	Succeeded by Peter Tapsell
New title	Minister for Women's Affairs; 1984–1987	Succeeded by Margaret Shields
Diplomatic posts
Preceded by David McDowell	Permanent Representative to the United Nations in New York; 1988–1990	Succeeded by Terence O'Brien
