= Bruce Beetham =

New Zealand academic and politician

Bruce Beetham QSO
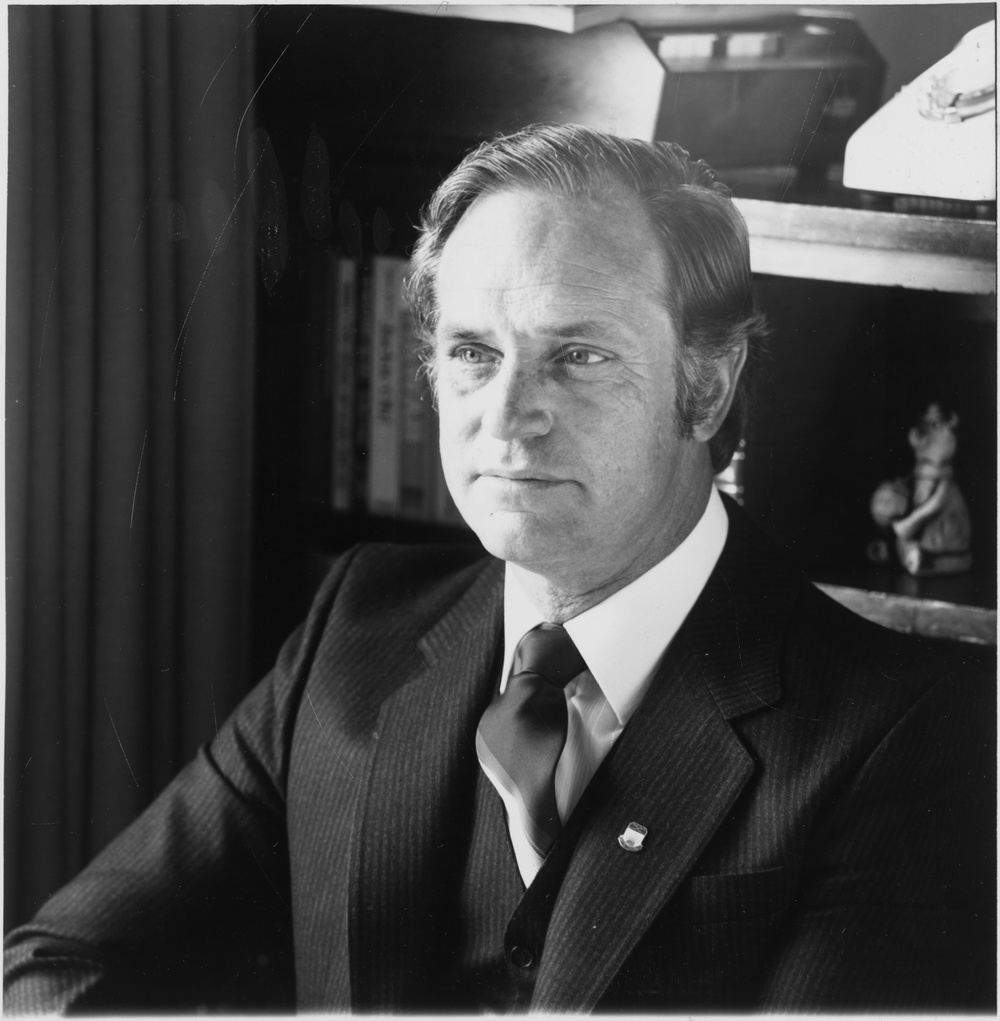

5th Leader of the Social Credit Party
- In office 14 May 1972 – 23 August 1986
- Deputy: Les Hunter (1972–77); Jeremy Dwyer (1977–81); Gary Knapp (1981–85)
- Preceded by: John O'Brien
- Succeeded by: Neil Morrison

27th Mayor of Hamilton
- In office 12 May 1976 – 8 October 1977
- Deputy: Derek Heather
- Preceded by: Mike Minogue
- Succeeded by: Ross Jansen

Member of the New Zealand Parliament for Rangitikei
- In office 18 February 1978 – 14 July 1984
- Preceded by: Sir Roy Jack
- Succeeded by: Denis Marshall

Personal details
- Born: 16 February 1936 New Plymouth, New Zealand
- Died: 3 May 1997 (aged 61) Palmerston North, New Zealand
- Party: Social Credit
- Spouses: Raewyn Natalee Mitchell (m. 1965; div. 1980) Beverley May Clark (m. 1980)
- Children: 4
- Profession: Teacher
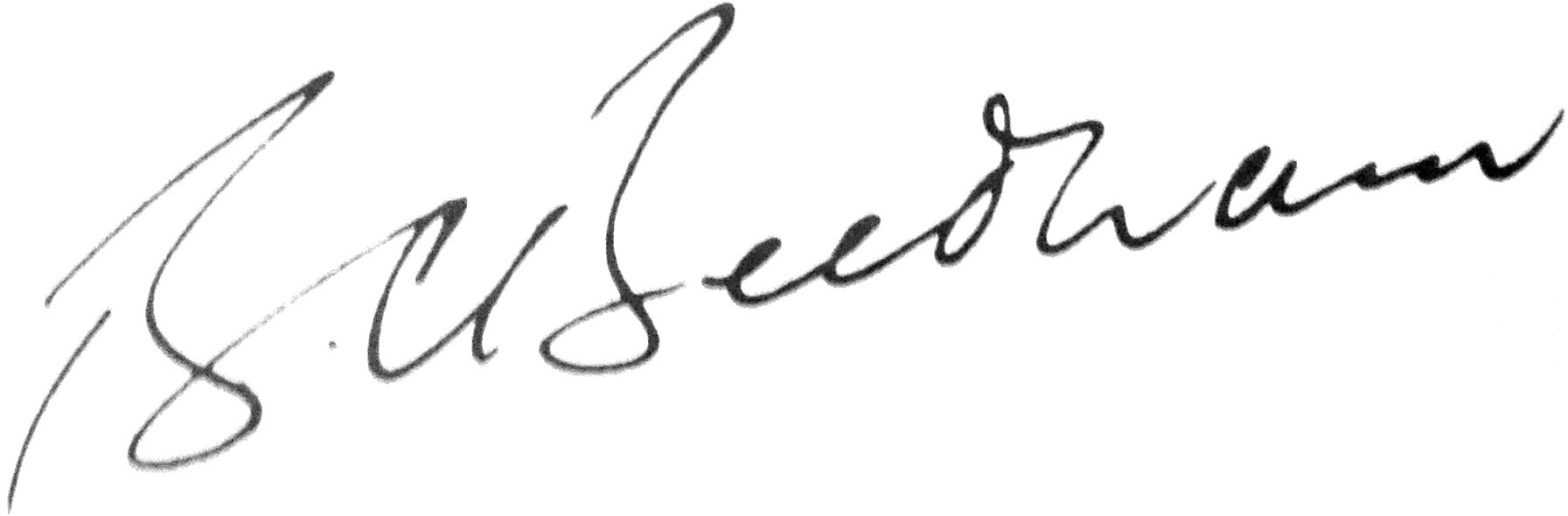
- Signature

Bruce Craig Beetham QSO (16 February 1936 – 3 May 1997) was an academic and politician from New Zealand, whose career spanned the 1970s and early 1980s.

A lecturer at Hamilton's University of Waikato and at the Hamilton Teachers' Training College, he was elected leader of the Social Credit Political League (which he had joined in 1969) in 1972, at a time when the party was in disarray and many were questioning its chances of survival. A brilliant organiser and an electrifying speaker, Beetham succeeded in rebuilding the party, and by the late 1970s it was challenging the stranglehold on the two-party system of the long-dominant National and Labour parties.

== Biography ==
=== Early life and career ===
Born in New Plymouth on 16 February 1936, he was the son of Stanley Develle Beetham (a carpenter) and his wife Frances Agnes Amy Watts. Beetham attended New Plymouth Boys' High School from 1951 to 1955. He then went on to the Auckland Secondary Teachers College where he eventually acquired a BA (honours) in History and later an MA. He worked as a secondary school teacher and worked in New Plymouth, Taupō and Piopio before lecturing at Hamilton Teachers' College. The Beetham family were Anglican but he instead joined a Presbyterian bible class and prior to training as a teacher he gave serious consideration to entering the ministry.

Beetham married Raewyn Natalee Mitchell, a dental nurse, on 21 August 1965 in Matamata. The two settled in Hamilton and had three sons and one daughter.

Beetham joined the then Social Credit Political League, during the 1969 general election campaign, after attending a talk by Don Bethune the Social Credit candidate for Hamilton West. Later, Beetham was elected as one of the vice presidents of the party in 1971. Also in 1971 he ran his first election campaign, an unsuccessful attempt for a position as a Hamilton City Councillor. His rapid rise in the Social Credit ranks was complete when he was elected Leader in 1972. At 36 he became the youngest leader of a political party in New Zealand's history. He presided over Social Credit's 1972 and 1975 election campaigns, in which they failed to get any members elected.

=== Mayor of Hamilton ===
In 1976, Beetham was elected Mayor of Hamilton in a by-election to replace Mike Minogue, who had resigned to take up a seat in Parliament. One of his early ideas as Mayor was to finance municipal projects with interest-free "rates vouchers", but the council, dominated by his opponents, passed a 20 percent rates increase instead. His frustrations caused by political gridlock, as well as the difficulty of simultaneously leading a national political party while serving as a Mayor (a post generally expected to be apolitical in New Zealand), were factors in his decision not to seek a second term as Mayor in 1977. Ross Jansen succeeded him.

=== Member of Parliament ===
New Zealand Parliament
Years	Term	Electorate	Party
1978	38th	Rangitikei	Social Credit
1978–1981	39th	Rangitikei	Social Credit
1981–1984	40th	Rangitikei	Social Credit

On 18 February 1978, Beetham won election to Parliament in a by-election for the Rangitikei electorate, to fill a vacancy caused by the death of its long-time member, the Parliamentary Speaker, Sir Roy Jack. He retained the seat in the general election later that year, and the Social Credit Political League polled 16 percent of the vote nationwide, its best result to date. His marriage to Raewyn had ended in 1978, with her remaining in Hamilton with the children. They divorced in 1980. Later that same year, Beetham married Beverley May Clark (née Morrison), who had two sons from her previous marriage, and came from a Social Credit family. Soon after the Beetham's moved to the outskirts of Marton. Beverley was an interior decorator by profession, who helped sharpen Beetham's style and dress sense.

In the 1981 election, the party polled just over 20 percent – the best showing for a third party since the 1920s, but fell short of its goal of holding the balance of power; its support was too evenly spread to translate into more than a couple of seats under the First-past-the-post electoral system in use at that time. The party, and Beetham himself, strongly promoted a form of proportional representation, but this was not adopted till many years later. However this saw the addition of Gary Knapp as a second Social Credit MP, meaning the party could make more of an impact inside Parliament itself.

In May 1982 National Party Prime Minister Robert Muldoon announced plans to build the controversial Clyde Dam (part of Think Big), but faced backbench dissidents voting against it. Initially opposed to the dam, Beetham and Knapp visited the dam site in Otago and reconsidered their stance. Social Credit agreed to vote for the necessary legislation in return for policy concessions from National. However, Muldoon did not deliver on most of his pledges which made Beetham and Knapp look naïve. The affair caused considerable damage to Social Credit's popularity.

In line with his party's policies, Beetham attempted to organise a barter trade deal with Fiji. Prime Minister Robert Muldoon vetoed the deal.

A number of factors resulted in a sharp drop in support for the Social Credit Party in the general election of 1984. One of these factors was Beetham's ill health. A major heart attack in 1983 curtailed his activities for much of that year and early 1984, and his disappearance from the public view made it possible for a new political party, the New Zealand Party (founded by millionaire businessman Bob Jones) to fill the vacuum. This party succeeded in attracting much of the protest vote that Social Credit had previously enjoyed. Another major factor was Beetham's earlier support for the construction of the Clyde Dam, which was strongly opposed by Social Credit's rank and file with many supporters accusing him of betrayal.

Beetham lost his Rangitikei seat in 1984, mainly because of electoral boundary changes; suspicions have lingered since that the redistribution may have been politically motivated (Gerrymandering). The redrawing of electoral boundaries that year saw his home town of Marton excluded from the Rangitikei electorate.

After losing his seat in Parliament, Beetham considered resigning as Social Credit leader but was persuaded to stay on after being offered a full-time salary to do so. He was then asked to stand in the Timaru seat at a by-election in June 1985. Beetham did not rule out standing, but inferred it unlikely and would do so only if Social Credit's previous candidate in the seat was unwilling to stand again. He did not stand after Lynley Simmons, who had been Social Credit's candidate for Timaru in 1981 and 1984, agreed to be the candidate. Out of parliament, his health improved but the party's popularity continued to decline. In 1985 Social Credit rebranded itself as the New Zealand Democratic Party, a move Beetham had little enthusiasm for. Internal dissent began to set in and Knapp tried to convince Beetham to stand aside as leader. Beetham refused to resign and Knapp resigned as deputy leader in protest.

=== Political twilight ===
In 1986, Beetham lost the leadership of the party to Neil Morrison who had been elected an MP in 1984. The new leader, on the night he was elected, implied in a TV interview that the Social Credit national dividend policy was out of date and would be dropped. This was in response to a question from the interviewer, which he might not have listened to carefully. The next day Beetham said he was considering resigning because the new leadership was rejecting basic Social Credit philosophy. This promoted Morrison to publicly retract his comments, and affirm that of course the national dividend would be retained as an important part of Social Credit policy. Beetham remained active in politics despite losing the leadership. He contested his old seat under the party's new name in 1987. He came second in Rangitikei and both Morrison and Knapp lost their seats. Beetham blamed the change in leadership and party name for the failure. After failing to regain the seat he ruled out running there at the subsequent election or vying for the leadership again. He was critical of the party leadership and campaign stating, if run well, it should have retained East Coast Bays and Pakuranga as well as pick up both Rangitikei and Wanganui.

In 1988, in response to the abandonment of the party's old name and policy platforms, he formed and led Social Credit-NZ which less of a political party but more of a pressure group organisation dedicated to furthering Social Credit monetary aims and financial principles. He was chairman of the organisation until 1995. At the 1990 election he led the new party, under the old Social Credit banner, and stood in Palmerston North instead of Rangitikei. In 1992, he attempted to put together a coalition of centrist parties, the New Zealand Centre Coalition, but was overtaken by the course of events as numerous new parties were formed around that time and crowded out the political spectrum.

His last electoral campaign was in 1996 as an independent candidate for his old Rangitikei electorate. Although placed fifth, he received almost 3,400 votes, which is a reasonable result for an independent.

=== Local politics ===
Following the loss of his seat in Parliament, Beetham devoted his energies to local government. In 1986 he was elected as a member of the Marton Borough Council, and was also deputy mayor, until 1989. He represented Rangitikei on the Wanganui Hospital Board (later renamed Manawatu-Wanganui Area Health Board) from 1986 to 1991. He was also elected the representative for Rangitikei on the Manawatu-Wanganui Regional Council in 1989 (where he chaired the council's Resources and Policy Committee) and remained a member until his death.

Beetham was also a member of the Massey University Council, chairman of the board of the Palmerston North College of Education and an executive member of the New Zealand Council for Teacher Education.

=== Death ===
Beetham died of heart failure in 1997 at the age of 61 in Palmerston North Hospital. He had been in hospital for nearly two weeks after an angina attack. He was survived by his wife, Beverley, four children and two stepsons. His death also necessitated a by-election for the Manawatu-Wanganui Regional Council. His funeral service was held at St Stephen's Anglican Church in Marton and attracted 450 mourners who were asked to pray for monetary reform.

== Political positions ==
Beetham was known as a liberal on human rights, a conservative on moral and social issues, and a pragmatist on economic matters. His humanistic approach has been attributed to his childhood admiration of Labour Party Prime Minister Michael Joseph Savage, while growing up in the Great Depression. He disliked confrontation, preferring to work for consensus in decision-making. Beetham was opposed to abortion, adhering to Social Credit's traditional conservatism on social issues.

== Honours and awards ==
In 1977, Beetham was awarded the Queen Elizabeth II Silver Jubilee Medal. In the 1988 New Year Honours, he was appointed a Companion of the Queen's Service Order for public services, and in 1990 he was awarded the New Zealand 1990 Commemoration Medal.

== Notes ==
New Zealand Parliament
Preceded by Sir Roy Jack	Member of Parliament for Rangitikei; 1978–1984	Succeeded by Denis Marshall
Political offices
Preceded by Mike Minogue	Mayor of Hamilton; 1976–1977	Succeeded by Ross Jansen
Party political offices
Preceded by John O'Brien	Leader of the Social Credit Party; 1972–1986	Succeeded by Neil Morrison
