= 38th New Zealand Parliament =

Term of the Parliament of New Zealand

38th Parliament of New Zealand
←	37th Parliament	39th Parliament	→
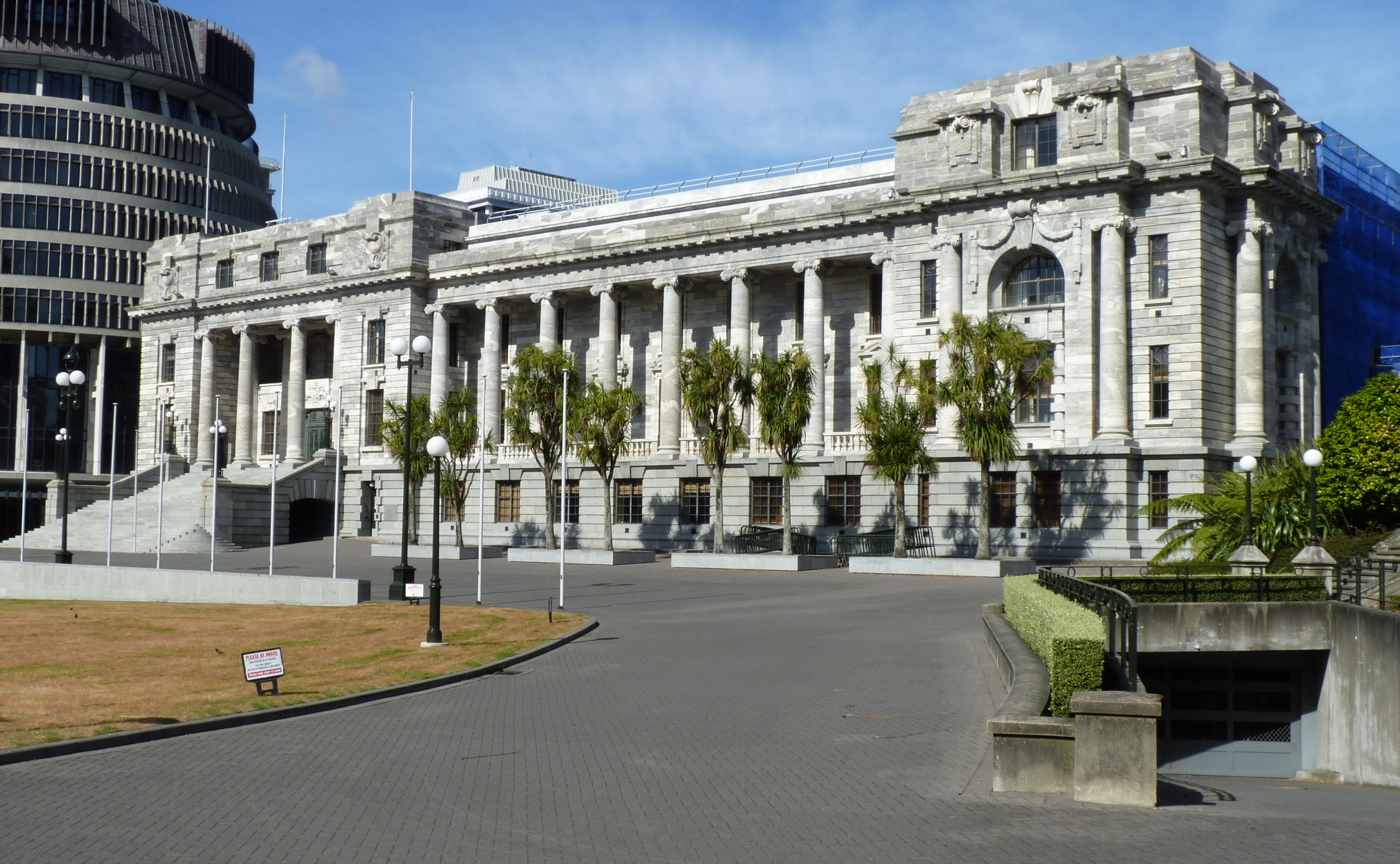
- Parliament House, Wellington

Overview
- Legislative body: New Zealand Parliament
- Term: 22 June 1976 – 6 October 1978
- Election: 1975 New Zealand general election
- Government: Third National Government

House of Representatives
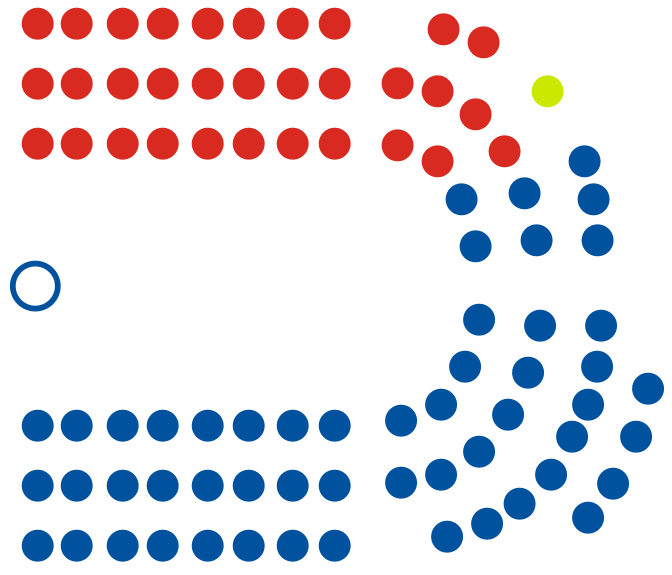
- Members: 87
- Speaker of the House: Richard Harrison from 10 May 1978 — Roy Jack until 24 December 1977 †
- Prime Minister: Robert Muldoon
- Leader of the Opposition: Bill Rowling

Sovereign
- Monarch: Elizabeth II
- Governor-General: Keith Holyoake from 26 October 1977 — Denis Blundell until 5 October 1977

The 38th New Zealand Parliament was a term of the New Zealand Parliament. It was elected at the 1975 general election on 29 November of that year.

== 1975 general election ==
The 1975 general election was held on Saturday, 29 November. A total of 92 MPs were elected; 63 represented North Island electorates, 25 represented South Island electorates, and the remaining four represented Māori electorates; this was an increase in the number of MPs by five since the 1972 election, and the gain was all for the North Island. 1,953,050 voters were enrolled and the official turnout at the election was 82.5%.

== Sessions ==
The 38th Parliament sat for four sessions (there were two sessions in 1977), and was prorogued on 7 October 1978.

Session	Opened	Adjourned
first	22 June 1976	14 December 1976
second	28 February 1977	28 February 1977
third	19 May 1977	16 December 1977
fourth	10 May 1978	6 October 1978

== Ministries ==
The Labour Party, which had come to power at the 1972 election, was defeated by the National Party at the 1975 election. Robert Muldoon formed the third National Government and led the Muldoon Ministry until National's defeat at the 1984 election.

== Overview of seats ==
The table below shows the number of MPs in each party following the 1975 election and at dissolution:

Affiliation	Members	
Affiliation	At 1975 election	At dissolution
National	55	54
Government total	55	54
Labour	32	32
Social Credit	0	1
Government total	32	33
Total	87	87
Working Government majority	23	21

Notes

- The Working Government majority is calculated as all Government MPs less all other parties.

== Initial composition of the 38th Parliament ==
The table below shows the results of the 1975 general election:

Key

National Labour Social Credit

Electorate results for the 1975 New Zealand general election
Electorate	Incumbent	Winner	Majority	Runner up
General electorates
Auckland Central	Norman Douglas	Richard Prebble	289	Murray McCully
Avon	Mary Batchelor		5,503	Tom George
Awarua	Aubrey Begg	Rex Austin	2,150	Aubrey Begg
Bay of Plenty	Percy Allen	Duncan MacIntyre	3,960	Robert Frederick McKee
Birkenhead	Norman King	Jim McLay	2,816	Norman King
Christchurch Central	Bruce Barclay		2,973	Tim Armitage
Clutha	Peter Gordon		4,735	F A O'Connell
Coromandel	Leo Schultz		4,724	Raymond C. Bradley
Dunedin Central	Brian MacDonell		1,428	Ian Bright
Dunedin North	Ethel McMillan	Richard Walls	958	Brian Arnold
East Coast Bays	Frank Gill		5,594	Rex Stanton
Eden	Mike Moore	Aussie Malcolm	1,331	Mike Moore
Egmont	Venn Young		4,120	Dennis Duggan
Franklin	Bill Birch		7,605	Ron Ng-Waishing
Gisborne	Trevor Davey	Bob Bell	1,321	Trevor Davey
Grey Lynn	Eddie Isbey		2,839	Jens Meder
Hamilton East	Rufus Rogers	Ian Shearer	2,246	Rufus Rogers
Hamilton West	Dorothy Jelicich	Mike Minogue	2,069	Dorothy Jelicich
Hastings	Richard Mayson	Bob Fenton	491	Richard Mayson
Hawkes Bay	Richard Harrison		3,805	David Butcher
Henderson	Martyn Finlay		401	Warren Adams
Heretaunga	Ron Bailey		336	Julie Cameron
Hobson	Logan Sloane	Neill Austin	4,101	Howard Manning (Note: David Lange came third for Labour in Hobson)
Hutt	Trevor Young		1,019	Brett Newell
Invercargill	J. B. Munro	Norman Jones	2,533	J. B. Munro
Island Bay	Gerald O'Brien		1,274	Bill Nathan
Kapiti	Frank O'Flynn	Barry Brill	2,222	Frank O'Flynn
Karori	Jack Marshall	Hugh Templeton	4,830	Margaret Shields
King Country	Jim Bolger		4,316	Thomas Varnam
Lyttelton	Tom McGuigan	Colleen Dewe	999	Tom McGuigan
Manawatu	Allan McCready		2,918	Alan Charles Eyles
Mangere	Colin Moyle		1,604	Stanley Lawson
Manukau	Roger Douglas		678	Brian Leaming
Manurewa	Phil Amos	Merv Wellington	1,358	Phil Amos
Marlborough	Ian Brooks	Ed Latter	3,010	Ian Brooks
Miramar	Bill Young		1,749	John Wybrow
Mt Albert	Warren Freer		247	Frank Ryan
Napier	Gordon Christie		931	John Isles
Nelson	Stan Whitehead		1,093	Ian McWhannel
New Lynn	Jonathan Hunt		890	Barry O'Connor
New Plymouth	Ron Barclay	Tony Friedlander	1,935	Ron Barclay
North Shore	George Gair		5,247	Wyn Hoadley
Oamaru	Bill Laney	Jonathan Elworthy	2,196	Bill Laney
Onehunga	Hugh Watt	Frank Rogers	1,044	Kevin O'Brien
Otago Central	Ian Quigley	Warren Cooper	2,371	Ian Quigley
Otahuhu	Bob Tizard		3,785	Lois Morris
Pahiatua	Keith Holyoake		6,769	Paul Thornicroft
Pakuranga	Gavin Downie		7,016	Geoff Braybrooke
Palmerston North	Joe Walding	John Lithgow	142	Joe Walding
Papanui	Bert Walker		2,985	Rod Garden
Petone	Fraser Colman		2,834	Brel Gluyas
Piako	Jack Luxton		6,174	Helen Clark
Porirua	Gerry Wall		2,265	Ross Doughty
Raglan	Douglas Carter	Marilyn Waring	3,756	Bill Pickering
Rakaia	Colin McLachlan		5,237	Graeme Lowrie
Rangiora	Kerry Burke	Derek Quigley	1,386	Kerry Burke
Rangitikei	Roy Jack		1,756	Bruce Beetham
Remuera	Allan Highet		8,656	G B Mead
Riccarton	Eric Holland		4,766	Don Johnson
Rodney	Peter Wilkinson		7,817	John Prebble
Roskill	Arthur Faulkner		530	John Maurice Priestley
Rotorua	Harry Lapwood		3,605	Peter Tapsell
Ruahine	Les Gandar		2,763	Rex Willing
St Albans	Roger Drayton		1,570	Prudence Rotherberg
St Kilda	Bill Fraser		1,890	Gordon Heslop
South Canterbury	Rob Talbot		4,301	Neville Lambert
Stratford	David Thomson		5,667	P P Hopkins
Sydenham	John Kirk		3,817	Paul Matheson
Tamaki	Robert Muldoon		6,735	Tim Kaye
Tasman	Bill Rowling		529	Peter Malone
Taupo	Jack Ridley	Ray La Varis	1,614	Jack Ridley
Tauranga	Keith Allen		4,843	Richard Hendry
Timaru	Sir Basil Arthur		1,011	Dave Walker
Waikato	Lance Adams-Schneider		7,073	Brian West
Wairarapa	Jack Williams	Ben Couch	1,468	Jack Williams
Waitemata	Michael Bassett	Dail Jones	1,385	Michael Bassett
Wallace	Brian Talboys		6,978	Ian Lamont
Wanganui	Russell Marshall		1,244	John Rowan
Wellington Central	Ken Comber		1,076	David Shand
West Coast	Paddy Blanchfield		2,401	Barry Dallas
Western Hutt	Henry May	Bill Lambert	109	Henry May (Note: Henry May was first on election night, but lost when special votes were included)
Whangarei	Murray Smith	John Elliott	2,710	Murray Smith
Wigram	Mick Connelly		1,967	Neil Russell
Māori electorates
Eastern Maori	Paraone Reweti		6,261	Monty Searancke
Northern Maori	Matiu Rata		4,151	Winston Peters
Southern Maori	Whetu Tirikatene-Sullivan		6,452	Willard Amaru
Western Maori	Koro Wētere		8,925	Emerson Studholme Rangi

Table footnotes:

== By-elections during 38th Parliament ==
There were a number of changes during the term of the 38th Parliament.

Electorate and by-election		Date	Incumbent	Cause	Winner
Nelson	1976	28 February	Sir Stanley Whitehead	Death	Mel Courtney
Mangere	1977	26 March	Colin Moyle	Resignation	David Lange
Pahiatua	1977	30 April	Sir Keith Holyoake	Appointed as Governor-General	John Falloon
Rangitikei	1978	18 February	Sir Roy Jack	Death	Bruce Beetham
