= Jerry Skinner =

New Zealand politician

The Honourable Jerry Skinner MC
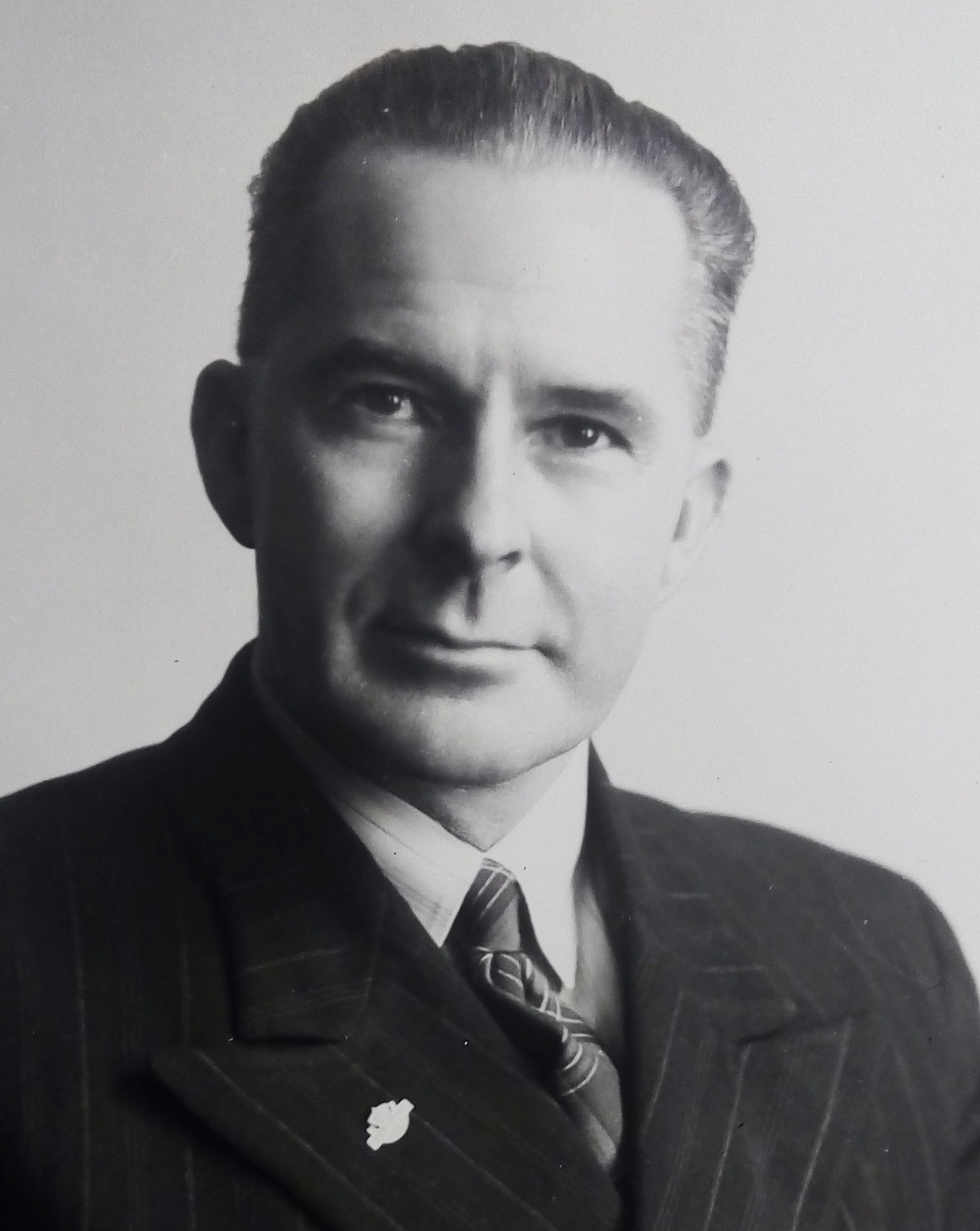
- Skinner c. 1950

3rd Deputy Prime Minister of New Zealand
- In office 12 December 1957 – 12 December 1960
- Prime Minister: Walter Nash
- Preceded by: Jack Marshall
- Succeeded by: Jack Marshall

21st Minister of Agriculture
- In office 12 December 1957 – 12 December 1960
- Prime Minister: Walter Nash
- Preceded by: Sidney Walter Smith
- Succeeded by: William Gillespie

32nd Minister of Lands
- In office 12 December 1957 – 12 December 1960
- Prime Minister: Walter Nash
- Preceded by: Geoff Gerard
- Succeeded by: Geoff Gerard
- In office 29 October 1943 – 13 December 1949
- Prime Minister: Peter Fraser
- Preceded by: Jim Barclay
- Succeeded by: Ernest Corbett

Member of the New Zealand Parliament for Buller
- In office 27 November 1946 – 26 April 1962
- Preceded by: Paddy Webb
- Succeeded by: Bill Rowling

Member of the New Zealand Parliament for Motueka
- In office 15 October 1938 – 27 November 1946
- Preceded by: Keith Holyoake

Personal details
- Born: 19 January 1900 Melbourne, Colony of Victoria
- Died: 26 April 1962 (aged 62) Tākaka, Tasman, New Zealand
- Party: Labour
- Spouses: Julia Buckley Gray (m. 1924; died 1957) Lois Mehaffey (m. 1958)
- Children: 2
- Awards: Military Cross

Military service
- Allegiance: New Zealand Army
- Years of service: 1939–43
- Rank: Major
- Battles/wars: World War II

Clarence Farrington Skinner MC (19 January 1900 – 26 April 1962), commonly known as Jerry or Gerry Skinner, was a Labour politician from New Zealand, the third deputy prime minister of New Zealand between 1957 and 1960, and a minister from 1943 to 1949 and 1957 to 1960 in the First and Second Labour governments.

== Biography ==
=== Early life ===
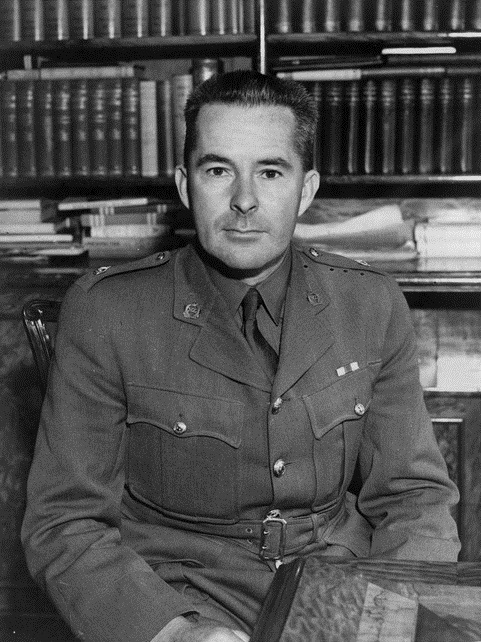
Skinner as an army major in WWII

Skinner was born on 19 January 1900 in Melbourne, Australia, before subsequently emigrating to New Zealand. His father was a missionary in Te Kopuru, near Hokianga.

Skinner settled in the Waitaki District and married Julia Buckley Gray of Palmerston North in 1924. They were to have two sons together, who later went into business in Westport together. Skinner established himself politically as a union leader in Westport whilst working as a carpenter by trade. He then turned his profession to farming up until the depression in the early 1930s.

He distinguished himself after being elected the president of the Inangahua Medical Association. He was instrumental in setting up a co-operative medical insurance scheme for labourers working building the Waitaki hydroelectric station alongside Andy Davidson, Arnold Nordmeyer and Gervan & Ethel McMillan. All subsequently becoming prominent members of the Labour party.

=== Military career ===
Skinner served in the New Zealand Army in the Middle East during World War II. Starting out as a Sapper in the fourth reinforcements, Skinner rose to the rank of Major in the North African campaign. He was wounded in action in 1942 and was mentioned in dispatches. He was later awarded the Military Cross in 1943 for mine clearing during the First Battle of El Alamein. At night he had cleared the way for Allied tanks to launch a counterattack to an Axis breakthrough. In June 1943 he was undertaking a lecturing tour of Britain for the Ministry of Information when he was recalled to New Zealand upon receiving a promotion to cabinet because of his fine record as a soldier by Prime Minister Peter Fraser.

=== Member of Parliament ===
New Zealand Parliament
Years	Term	Electorate	Party
1938–1943	26th	Motueka	Labour
1943–1946	27th	Motueka	Labour
1946–1949	28th	Buller	Labour
1949–1951	29th	Buller	Labour
1951–1954	30th	Buller	Labour
1954–1957	31st	Buller	Labour
1957–1960	32nd	Buller	Labour
1960–1962	33rd	Buller	Labour

Skinner was a Member of Parliament from 1938 to 1962; he was MP for Motueka between 1938 and 1946 (having defeated new MP Keith Holyoake in 1938), then MP for Buller from 1946 to 1962. Early on in his career as an MP, Skinner was somewhat sympathetic to the plight of John A. Lee, but did not to support him openly. Skinner made good impressions as an MP and gained a reputation for possessing "down-to-earth Kiwi common sense".

=== First Labour Government ===
Between 1943 and 1949 he held several ministries; Lands, Rehabilitation, Valuation and State Forests. As Minister of Rehabilitation he distinguished himself in the area of soldier resettlement, enabling returned servicemen to return to live and work in New Zealand following World War II. As a minister Skinner gained a reputation of sincerity, which helped his otherwise lackings as an orator.

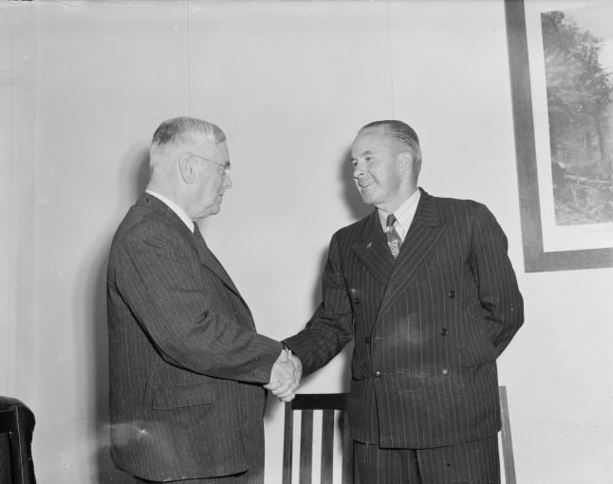
Nash congratulating Skinner upon election as his deputy

Skinner was seen by many as Labour's rising star. In recognition of this, he was subsequently elected deputy-leader of the Labour Party in 1951 while it was in opposition. However, there had been speculation that he had sought the leadership, but this was dismissed as merely media gossip. In the attempted coup against Walter Nash's leadership in 1954, Skinner sided with Nash and his status as the deputy-leader was reaffirmed when he remained unopposed in the position. In 1956 he suffered a heart attack, but made a good recovery in the following months.

In 1953, Skinner was awarded the Queen Elizabeth II Coronation Medal.

=== Second Labour Government ===
Following Labour's victory in the 1957 election, Skinner became Deputy Prime Minister in Walter Nash's ministry. He also held the Lands and Agriculture portfolios. In government, Skinner still did not make further impressions in public opinion, where he was still seen by the public as merely in Nash's shadow.

As Minister of Agriculture Skinner fought against unfair trading practices in the United Kingdom regarding New Zealand's dairy imports. New Zealand faced a recurring problem. Dairy prices had fallen drastically, largely because a number of countries were 'dumping' subsidized butter. Skinner led a delegation of officials which persuaded the British government to reduced tariff preferences for New Zealand goods in return for exempting British goods from quantitative restrictions. He likewise passed an act of parliament to safeguard New Zealand's livestock against Hydatid disease. As a result of his work in the area, it is said that Skinner was an instrumental figure in the establishment of New Zealand's pulp and paper industry.

A notable feature of the Second Labour Government was Nash's frequent absences from the country. This left Skinner to be acting Prime Minister both frequently, and for lengthy periods. He was effectively in charge of the governments domestic affairs whilst Nash busied himself with international matters.

His first wife died in 1957 and in 1958 he married Lois Mehaffey. Skinner was the acting Prime Minister at the time of his wedding.

=== Opposition ===
Following the Labour defeat at the 1960 election, Skinner again became Deputy Leader of the Opposition. Walter Nash favoured Skinner as his successor and was planning to announce his retirement as leader at Labour's 1962 party conference to clear the way for Skinner. The media and public were widely anticipating Skinner to lead Labour at the 1963 election. After Skinner's sudden death (only a week before the 1962 conference) Nash then favoured Fred Hackett to replace him after he had been elected Skinner's successor as deputy leader. However, Hackett then too died leaving Nash to be replaced by Arnold Nordmeyer when he eventually resigned in 1963. It was speculated that Skinner had died with the knowledge that the party leadership would soon be his and that the caucus had already approved of his succession to Nash, however Nash strongly denied the suggestion.

=== Death ===
Skinner attended the Anzac Day ceremony at the Wellington Cenotaph as opposition representative before returning to his home in Tākaka later in the day. He died in his sleep early the next morning, aged 62. He was survived by his second wife and two sons.

One of his sons, Terry, was the longtime secretary of Labour's Southern Buller electorate committee. After his father's death, he stood for the Labour nomination at the Buller by-election but lost out to Bill Rowling. He remained on friendly terms with Rowling and continued as secretary for many years.

== Notes ==
Political offices
Preceded by Jack Marshall	Deputy Prime Minister of New Zealand; 1957–1960	Succeeded by Jack Marshall
Preceded by Sidney Walter Smith	Minister of Agriculture; 1957–1960	Succeeded by William Gillespie
Preceded by Geoff Gerard	Minister of Lands; 1957–1960 1943–1949	Succeeded by Geoff Gerard
Preceded by Jim Barclay	Minister of Lands; 1957–1960 1943–1949	Succeeded by Ernest Corbett
Preceded by Jim Barclay	Commissioner of State Forests; 1944–1949	Succeeded by Ernest Corbett
New Zealand Parliament
Preceded by Keith Holyoake	Member of Parliament for Motueka; 1938–1946	Constituency abolished
Preceded by Paddy Webb	Member of Parliament for Buller; 1946–1962	Succeeded by Bill Rowling
Party political offices
Preceded by Walter Nash	Deputy-Leader of the Labour Party; 1951–1962	Succeeded by Fred Hackett
