= Phil Amos =

New Zealand politician (1925–2007)

The Honourable Phil Amos QSO
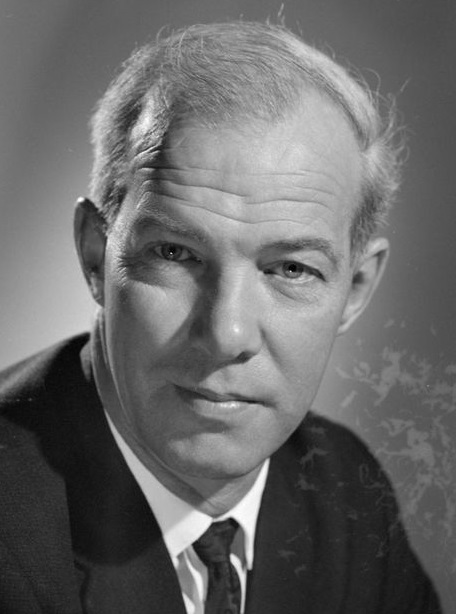
- Amos in 1968

31st Minister of Education
- In office 8 December 1972 – 12 December 1975
- Prime Minister: Norman Kirk; Bill Rowling
- Preceded by: Lorrie Pickering
- Succeeded by: Les Gandar

18th Minister of Island Affairs
- In office 8 December 1972 – 10 September 1974
- Prime Minister: Norman Kirk; Bill Rowling
- Preceded by: Duncan MacIntyre
- Succeeded by: Office abolished

Member of the New Zealand Parliament for Manurewa
- In office 30 November 1963 – 29 November 1975
- Preceded by: New constituency
- Succeeded by: Merv Wellington

Personal details
- Born: Phillip Albert Amos; 4 September 1925 Wanganui, New Zealand
- Died: 8 June 2007 (aged 81) Auckland, New Zealand
- Party: Labour
- Relations: Jill Amos (1st wife) Odilia Amos nee Mmanda (2nd wife)
- Children: 4
- Profession: Teacher, politician

Phillip Albert Amos QSO (4 September 1925 – 8 June 2007) was a New Zealand politician of the Labour Party. He was of Māori (Kāi Tahu) and Pākehā descent.

== Biography ==
=== Early life ===
Amos was born in Wanganui in 1925, the son of John Amos. He received his education at Otorohanga District High School, later renamed as Otorohanga College. He attended Auckland Teachers College followed by the University of Auckland.

He was a Royal New Zealand Air Force (RNZAF) pilot in the Pacific in World War II. After demobilizing in 1946 he went to Teachers' College and University, where he studied both anthropology and politics. He had a passion for human rights and was strongly opposed to racism, in particular the apartheid system in South Africa and Rhodesia. This lead him to sign up with the Princes Street branch of the Labour Party in 1949 contrasting with the strong National Party affiliation in his father's family.

As a teacher Amos aspired to be his own boss and chose to work at a sole-charge school to avoid taking orders from a principal. He then won promotion to a two-teacher school which he could also be principal of. He later taught at intermediate and secondary schools as well. Amos and his wife Jill worked as teachers in isolated communities where they were confronted by the challenges facing Maori and Pacific people due to rural isolation and later urban migration. There they taught student notions such as non-violence, racial equality and belief in parental involvement in schools. Such attitudes were then uncommon in New Zealand education circles.

=== Political career ===
New Zealand Parliament
Years	Term	Electorate	Party
1963–1966	34th	Manurewa	Labour
1966–1969	35th	Manurewa	Labour
1969–1972	36th	Manurewa	Labour
1972–1975	37th	Manurewa	Labour

In 1960 he stood for Labour in the Rodney electorate, coming second. He was then elected the Member of Parliament for Manurewa from 1963 defeating cabinet minister Leon Götz. He was appointed Labour's education spokesperson by leader Norman Kirk while the party was in opposition.

Kirk appointed Amos Minister of Education in the Third Labour Government from 1972 to 1975, and also served as the last Minister of Island Affairs from 1972 to 1974. As Minister of Education, he passed the Private Schools Conditional Integration Act which drove the integration of Catholic and private schools with a system which provided them with state funding and worked towards the reduction of class sizes. Allowing private schools to voluntarily integrate with the state system without sacrificing their particular character was seen as outside the traditional Labour Party policy sphere. The integration policy was seen as the governments greatest contribution in the education space. Other accomplishments as Minister of Education were doubling the number of children enrolled in pre-school education, expanding community education and technical institute services, increasing opportunity for students to learn Maori, reducing class sizes and provided a standard bursary for all students in tertiary studies.

In 1975 he was defeated in an upset in the normally safe Labour seat by Merv Wellington. Amos found Kirk's leadership and vision inspiring and thought his death in 1974 to be a crushing blow to Labour. Consequently, he was unsurprised when in 1975 the Labour government was defeated by the National Party.

=== Later life ===
In July 1976, less than a year after he had lost his parliamentary seat and cabinet post, he protested the visit of the 20,000 tonne American cruiser USS Long Beach in his small yacht the Dolphin. He impeded its entry to Auckland Harbour. The cruiser was forced to stop mid-stream to allow grappling hooks to be thrown to pull the Dolphin clear. Afterwards Amos was arrested and charged with obstruction. He was convicted, but the conviction was overturned on appeal by criminal defense lawyer David Lange. Amos' protest instantly became a headline-grabbing piece of political drama from which he took a lot of personal satisfaction at bringing public attention to the anti-nuclear issue. Lange would later become Prime Minister and passed a law banning the visit by nuclear propelled or armed ships with Amos' support.

As a friend of the Tanzanian President Julius Nyerere, he accepted an invitation to be an education advisor as well as a Swahili interpreter/translator, assisting the local police, courts and other government agencies. He lived in a remote part of Tanzania from 1977 to 1988. In a brief return to Auckland in late 1978 he stated that the impacts of the Muldoon government continuing sporting links with South Africa were leading to people in Africa believing that New Zealanders were racist. He was so dismayed by the view of New Zealand in the area that he wrote a letter to the editor to a widely circulated English language newspaper in his area denying that the people in New Zealand supported the Apartheid system in South Africa. His wife Jill went back to New Zealand in 1979 and they later divorced. He then worked as a lecturer at a teachers' college before moving with his second wife, a fellow lecturer Odilia, to work a farm near her home village on the remote slopes of Mount Kilamanjaro (even climbing to the top himself). He made a living by operating a flour mill he built to serve local farmers and also grew bananas, avocados, pineapple, corn, and vegetables on the one hectare plot they owned. Amos said the period in his life as one of finding new challenges which met his personal philosophies

In 1985 he made headlines in New Zealand again after it was rumoured he had died following a failure to reply to an invitation from David Lange to attend a reception he was also attending in Dar-es-Salaam. Amos later said his "disappearance" was just an invention of the media. His first wife Jill said it was unusual for a former cabinet minister to voluntarily live in such a remote place but also stating "...he always was an unusual politician." A parliamentary colleague Richard Mayson who travelled to Tanzania to visit him, described Amos as living the life of a 20th-century version of David Livingstone.

In 1988 he returned to Auckland and immediately became disillusioned with the then state of the Labour Party and horrified by New Zealand's economic reforms, Rogernomics, which pushed for free market economy and privatisation of state assets. He protested by joining Jim Anderton's NewLabour Party (NLP) soon after it was formed and later became president of the party. He told Anderton he was "devastated by the actions of the Labour Party". He received many invitations to stand for parliament again for the NLP, but declined after consultation with his family who thought he was of better use as a "supportive and wise head for the new breed of NLP politicians." At the 1992 local-body elections he put himself forward as a candidate for the Mount Albert ward of the Auckland City Council. Standing as an Alliance candidate (the NLP was a component party of the Alliance) he narrowly missed out on being elected by a margin of just 17 votes.

=== Death ===
Amos was a heavy smoker most of his life. He had been admitted to hospital several times in the months before he died in Auckland on 8 June 2007 of lung failure, aged 81. He was survived by his first and second wives and children from both his marriages.

== Personal life ==
He married Jill Edwina Turner in 1949, the daughter of Ross Turner, and had two sons and one daughter with her. He had one son with Anne Duncan. His second marriage was to Odilia. They had one daughter together and he adopted Odilia's other daughter. Odilia Amos died in 2011.

== Awards and recognition ==
Amos was awarded the New Zealand 1990 Commemoration Medal. In the 1994 Queen's Birthday Honours, he was appointed a Companion of the Queen's Service Order for public services.

== Notes ==
New Zealand Parliament
New constituency	Member of Parliament for Manurewa; 1963–1975	Succeeded by Merv Wellington
Political offices
Preceded by Lorrie Pickering	Minister of Education; 1972–1975	Succeeded by Les Gandar
Preceded by Duncan MacIntyre	Minister of Island Affairs; 1972–1974	Office abolished
Party political offices
Preceded by Matt McCarten	President of the NewLabour Party; 1990–1992	Succeeded by Matt McCarten
