= Rick Barker =

New Zealand politician

The Honourable Rick Barker
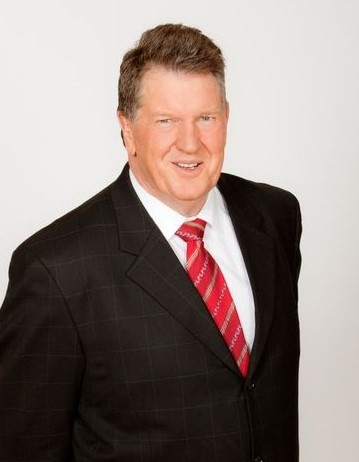

30th Minister of Internal Affairs
- In office 19 October 2005 – 19 November 2008
- Prime Minister: Helen Clark
- Preceded by: George Hawkins
- Succeeded by: Richard Worth

6th Minister for Courts
- In office 19 May 2003 – 19 November 2008
- Prime Minister: Helen Clark
- Preceded by: Margaret Wilson
- Succeeded by: Georgina te Heuheu

58th Minister of Customs
- In office 15 August 2002 – 19 October 2005
- Prime Minister: Helen Clark
- Preceded by: Jim Anderton
- Succeeded by: Nanaia Mahuta

Member of Parliament for Tukituki Hastings (1993–1996)
- In office 6 November 1993 – 17 September 2005
- Preceded by: Jeff Whittaker
- Succeeded by: Craig Foss

Personal details
- Born: 27 October 1951 (age 75) Greymouth, New Zealand
- Party: Labour
- Spouse: Patsy
- Children: 3
- Education: University of Otago

Richard John Barker (born 27 October 1951) is a New Zealand politician. He is a member of the Labour Party, and was a middle-ranking Cabinet minister in the Fifth Labour Government of New Zealand.

== Biography ==
=== Early life and career ===
Barker was born in the town of Greymouth, on New Zealand's West Coast. He attended Greymouth High School and then the University of Otago. After working as a shop assistant, bartender, storeworker, farmhand, driver, factory worker, and quarrier, he became involved in the trade unions, primarily those relating to the service sector. He eventually became National Secretary of the Service Workers' Union.

=== Member of Parliament ===
New Zealand Parliament
Years	Term	Electorate	List	Party
1993–1996	44th	Hastings		Labour
1996–1999	45th	Tukituki	28	Labour
1999–2002	46th	Tukituki	31	Labour
2002–2005	47th	Tukituki	24	Labour
2005–2008	48th	List	21	Labour
2008–2011	49th	List	34	Labour

Barker became a member of the Labour Party in 1973, served for a time as the Industrial Representative on the party's National Council and was also junior vice-president of the party. In the lead up to the 1993 election Barker sought the Labour nomination for the normally safe Labour seat of Heretaunga, but lost out to political advisor Heather Simpson. Later in 1993 he won the Labour nomination for the Hastings electorate, defeating Auckland Tamoana Freezing Workers' Union president Pat Weir. His selection was a surprise as Weir won the floor vote of local members, but the selection panel chose Barker. The Freezing Workers' Union laid a complaint with the Labour Party's head office alleging the panel had been stacked, an assertion rejected by party secretary Tony Timms.

At the 1993 election, he succeeded in winning the Hastings electorate, winning a seat that was previously held by the National Party. Soon after entering parliament he supported Helen Clark in her successful leadership challenge to Mike Moore. He was re-elected in 1996, 1999, and 2002 for the reconfigured seat of Tukituki. In 2005 he lost the seat in what was a large swing against the sitting Labour government in the provincial areas and returned to Parliament as a list MP. In 2008 Barker tried unsuccessfully to regain the seat of Tukituki and for the second time was returned to parliament as a Labour list MP. He stood in one of the safest National seats, Taranaki-King Country, in 2011 and was not high enough on the Labour list to remain an MP.

=== Cabinet minister ===
In 2002 Labour was re-elected for a second term and Barker was appointed to Cabinet as Minister of Customs, Minister for Courts, Associate Minister of Justice, and Associate Minister of Social Services and Employment. During the 2002–2005 term, he was given additional responsibility as Minister for the Community and Voluntary Sector and Minister for Small Business.

In 2005, Barker was re-appointed to Cabinet as the Minister of Internal Affairs, Minister for Courts, Minister of Civil Defence and Minister of Veterans' Affairs. Barker lost his ministerial warrants following Labour's defeat in the 2008 election; however, Barker was appointed by the House of Representatives to the role of Assistant Speaker for the 49th New Zealand Parliament for the session 2008–11.

As a cabinet minister, Barker was entitled to the title of The Honourable and became The Hon. Rick (Richard) Barker which is a title he was granted for the rest of his life after his term of office.

=== Post-parliamentary roles ===
Barker was elected to the Hawke's Bay Regional Council in 2013, representing the Hastings constituency. In 2016 he was appointed deputy chair of the council. On 30 June 2021 he was elected chair, holding the role until October 2022.

In June 2018, Barker was appointed chairperson of the West Coast District Health Board by the Minister of Health, David Clark. He was reappointed in December 2019.

== Personal life ==
He is married to Patsy and has three children.

== Notes ==
New Zealand Parliament
Preceded by Jeff Whittaker	Member of Parliament for Hastings; 1993–1996	Constituency abolished
New constituency	Member of Parliament for Tukituki; 1996–2005	Succeeded by Craig Foss
Political offices
Preceded by Jim Anderton	Minister of Customs; 2002–2005	Succeeded by Nanaia Mahuta
Preceded by Margaret Wilson	Minister for Courts; 2003–2005	Succeeded by Georgina te Heuheu
Preceded by George Hawkins	Minister of Civil Defence; 2005–2008	Succeeded by John Carter
Preceded by George Hawkins	Minister of Internal Affairs; 2005–2008	Succeeded by Richard Worth
Party political offices
Preceded by Mark Burton	Senior Whip of the Labour Party; 1999–2002 2011	Succeeded by David Benson-Pope
Preceded by Steve Chadwick	Senior Whip of the Labour Party; 1999–2002 2011	Succeeded by Chris Hipkins
