= Bob Fenton =

New Zealand politician

William Robert Fenton (9 October 1923 – 10 January 2013), known as Bob Fenton, was a New Zealand politician of the National Party.

== Biography ==
New Zealand Parliament
Years	Term	Electorate	Party
1975–1978	38th	Hastings	National

Fenton was born on 9 October 1923 at Napier, and was educated at Hastings High School. He served in World War II in the New Zealand Army and in the Royal New Zealand Air Force. In 1951, he married Dorothy Alice Ferrier, and the couple went on to have five children.

Fenton was a regional governor of the New Zealand chapter of Jaycees in 1960, and a world governor of Junior Chamber International. Fenton was strongly opposed to political interference in sport and held strong views on the rugby matches between South Africa and New Zealand.

In the 1975 election, Fenton stood for National in the Hastings electorate and defeated the incumbent, Labour's Richard Mayson. In the 1978 election, he was in turn defeated by Labour's David Butcher. Between 1979 and 1987, Fenton served as deputy chair of the Earthquake and War Damage Commission.

In 1977, Fenton was awarded the Queen Elizabeth II Silver Jubilee Medal, and in 1990 he received the New Zealand 1990 Commemoration Medal.

Fenton owned his own real estate company, Robert Fenton Real Estate, and was a fellow of the Real Estate Institute of New Zealand. He died in 2013.

== Notes ==
New Zealand Parliament
Preceded by Richard Mayson	Member of Parliament for Hastings; 1975–1978	Succeeded by David Butcher
