= Anne Fraser =

New Zealand politician

Anne Collins

Member of the New Zealand Parliament for East Cape
- In office 14 July 1984 – 27 October 1990
- Preceded by: Duncan MacIntyre
- Succeeded by: Tony Ryall

Personal details
- Born: Lowson Anne Collins; 20 July 1951 (age 75) Napier, New Zealand
- Party: Labour
- Spouse(s): Michael Cullen (m. 1989; died 2021) Bruce Fraser (div. 1989)
- Children: 2
- Profession: Teacher

Lowson Anne Collins, Lady Cullen (formerly Fraser; born 20 July 1951) is a New Zealand former politician of the Labour Party.

== Early life and family ==
Collins was born in Napier on 20 July 1951, the daughter of Lowson and Brian Collins. She was educated at Napier Girls' High School, and went on to study at Massey University, graduating BEd in 1982. Before entering politics she was a teacher.

== Parliamentary career ==
New Zealand Parliament
Years	Term	Electorate	Party
1984–1987	41st	East Cape	Labour
1987–1990	42nd	East Cape	Labour

In the early 1980s Fraser joined the Labour Party and became a branch secretary in the East Cape electorate. At the snap 1984 election she was selected as Labour's candidate for the seat. Her selection, according to the then Whakatane branch chair Margery Rennie, was because "...she's got plenty of guts and was prepared to take on an unpopular candidacy no one else was interested in." She was successful and won the seat from the National Party. She held the seat at the subsequent 1987 election by just 246 votes. In 1989 she launched New Zealand's rape awareness week, spending a considerable amount of time researching and writing her speech for the launch event only for the media to completely ignore the event.

When two important local events happened in her electorate she was outside on the electorate. They were an industrial dispute at the Tasman Works in Kawerau in 1987 and Cyclone Bola in 1988. This led to her being given the unflattering epithet "Absent Annie" by National Party MPs. This was despite locals (including National Party members) thinking she was a hard worker for the electorate particularly in the aftermath of both Cyclone Bola and the 1987 Edgecumbe earthquake. She announced in July 1989 she would retire from Parliament at the next election after two terms. She stated parliament was not a pleasant place and generally not enjoying the role. She also cited public scrutiny, her recent divorce and a desire to return to teaching as reasons for her retirement.

Before leaving parliament she enrolled at Massey University to study for a master's degree in education, intending to return to teaching. In 1990 she was awarded the New Zealand 1990 Commemoration Medal, and in 1993 she received the New Zealand Suffrage Centennial Medal.

== Personal life ==
Following her first marriage to Bruce Fraser she was known as Anne Fraser. In 1989, her name officially reverted to her maiden name Anne Collins after she had divorced her husband.

She was married to former Deputy Prime Minister and Finance Minister, Michael Cullen until his death in 2021.

== Notes ==
New Zealand Parliament
Preceded by Duncan MacIntyre	Member of Parliament for East Cape; 1984–1990	Succeeded by Tony Ryall
Honorary titles
Preceded by Carole Anderton	Spouse of the Deputy Prime Minister of New Zealand; 2002–2008	Succeeded by Mary English
