= New Zealand 1990 Commemoration Medal =

- Type: Commemorative medal
- Awarded for: Making a recognized contribution to New Zealand
- Country: New Zealand
- Presented by: Queen of New Zealand
- Eligibility: New Zealand and Commonwealth citizens
- Status: Only awarded in 1990
- Established: 9 February 1990

Highlights
- Total: 3,632
- Ribbon of the medal

Precedence
- Next (higher): King Charles III Coronation Medal
- Next (lower): New Zealand Suffrage Centennial Medal 1993

The New Zealand 1990 Commemoration Medal was a commemorative medal awarded in New Zealand in 1990 to celebrate the 150th anniversary of the signing of the Treaty of Waitangi, and was awarded to 3,632 people.

== Background ==
The New Zealand 1990 Commemoration Medal was instituted by Royal Warrant of Queen Elizabeth II on 9 February 1990. It was to be awarded only during 1990 to about 3,000 people selected in recognition of the contribution they have made to some aspect of New Zealand life, especially the various 1990 celebrations. A total of 3,632 medals were eventually awarded.

The medal is known as the Sesquicentennial Medal, because it was issued on the 150th anniversary of signing of the Treaty of Waitangi by representatives of the British Crown and various Māori chiefs from the North Island of New Zealand on 6 February 1840.

The New Zealand 1990 Commemoration Medal is an official medal to be worn on all occasions on which decorations and medals are worn. It is worn after Coronation and Jubilee medals, but before decorations and medals for long service. It was accompanied by a certificate bearing the signatures of the Queen, the Governor-General and the Prime Minister.

== Notable recipients ==
The following list includes notable people who received the New Zealand 1990 Commemoration Medal, and is not an exhaustive list of recipients.

=== A ===
- Max Abbott
- Nancy Adams
- Lance Adams-Schneider
- Ray Ahipene-Mercer
- Greg Aim
- Judith Aitken
- Tofilau Eti Alesana
- Percy Allen
- Phil Amos
- Gary Anderson
- John Anderson
- Noel Anderson
- Robert Anderson
- Ross Anderson
- Jim Anderton
- Jon Andrews
- Derek Angus
- Anne, Princess Royal
- Doug Anthony
- Te Atairangikaahu
- Ian Athfield
- Peter Atkins
- Anne Audain
- Margaret Austin
- Rex Austin
- Graeme Avery

=== B ===
- Ron Bailey
- Gary Ball
- Bill Ballantine
- Ann Ballin
- John Banks
- David Baragwanath
- Ron Barclay
- Jim Barnes
- Michael Bassett
- Mary Batchelor
- Margaret Bazley
- David Beattie
- Don Beaven
- Richard Bedford
- C. E. Beeby
- Bruce Beetham
- John Belgrave
- Jim Belich
- Garry Bell
- Bob Bell
- David Bellamy
- Charles Bennett
- Manuhuia Bennett
- Bill Birch
- Dave Bishop
- Gordon Bisson
- Norman Blacklock
- June Blundell
- Jim Bolger
- Joan Bolger
- Reg Boorman
- Betty Bourke
- Lionel Bowen
- John Bracewell
- Don Brash
- Geoff Braybrooke
- Barry Brill
- Bill Brock
- Gordon H. Brown
- Hilton Brown
- Len Brown
- Michael Brown
- Mick Brown
- Denis Browne
- Tony Browne
- John Buck
- Vicki Buck
- Marguerite Buist
- Philip Burdon
- John Burke
- Kerry Burke
- Carolyn Burns
- Mark Burton
- Hector Busby
- David Butcher

=== C ===
- Bruce Cameron
- Gregor Cameron
- Richard Campion
- David Carruthers
- John Carter
- Silvia Cartwright
- Maurice Casey
- Len Castle
- Marlene Castle
- David Caygill
- Charles III
- Ursula Cheer
- Neil Cherry
- John Chewings
- Muir Chilwell
- Ron Chippindale
- Gordon Christie
- Eric Clark
- Helen Clark
- John Clarke
- Caryll Clausen
- John Collinge
- Anne Collins
- Fraser Colman
- Ray Columbus
- Ken Comber
- Graham Condon
- Jeremy Coney
- Sandra Coney
- Craig Connell
- Mick Connelly
- Robin Cooke
- Nicky Cooney
- Angus Cooper
- Michael Cooper
- Morrin Cooper
- Warren Cooper
- Whina Cooper
- Assid Corban
- Miriam Corban
- Paul Cotton
- Ben Couch
- Mel Courtney
- Joy Cowley
- Michael Cox
- Wyatt Creech
- Sharon Crosbie
- Barry Crump
- Max Cryer
- Michael Cullen
- Peter Cullinane
- Allen Curnow
- Barry Curtis

=== D ===
- Barry Dallas
- John Daly-Peoples
- Kevin Darling
- Trevor Davey
- Sonja Davies
- Brian Davis
- Te Aue Davis
- Ronald Davison
- Graham Davy
- Neil Dawson
- Trevor de Cleene
- Geoffrey de Deney
- Roderick Deane
- Monita Delamere
- Miriam Dell
- Richard Dell
- Charlie Dempsey
- Avinash Deobhakta
- Susan Devoy
- Colleen Dewe
- Margaret di Menna
- Allan Dick
- Colin Dickinson
- Ian Dickison
- Jack Dodd
- Lynley Dodd
- Tim Dodds
- Akoka Doi
- Chris Doig
- Haddon Donald
- Joan Donley
- Felix Donnelly
- Nigel Donnelly
- Malcolm Douglas
- Roger Douglas
- Bernard Dowiyogo
- Gavin Downie
- Tessa Duder
- Michael Duffy
- John Dunmore
- Peter Dunne
- Eddie Durie
- Mason Durie
- Harry Duynhoven
- Jeremy Dwyer

=== E ===
- Paul East
- Elizabeth Edgar
- Sandra Edge
- Prince Edward
- Jim Edwards
- Eunice Eichler
- Jack Elder
- Sian Elias
- John Elliott
- Brian Elwood
- Jonathan Elworthy
- Peter Elworthy
- Timothy Elworthy
- Glen Evans
- Margaret Evans
- Dean Eyre

=== F ===
- David Fagan
- John Falloon
- Bob Fenton
- Bruce Ferguson
- Taito Phillip Field
- Betty Flint
- Alan Frampton
- Bob Francis
- Warren Foote
- Warren Freer

=== G ===
- Bill Gallagher
- Anne Gambrill
- Les Gandar
- Roy Geddes
- Jack George
- Geoff Gerard
- Jim Gerard
- Paul Gibbons
- Lowell Goddard
- Thomas Goddard
- Mark Gosche
- Jeff Grant
- Bruce Gregory
- Janet Grieve

=== H ===
- Nick Hall
- Nigel Hampton
- Elizabeth Hanan
- Anne Hare
- Bryce Harland
- Jenny Harper
- Graeme Harrison
- Pat Harrison
- Ann Hartley
- Lyn Hartley
- Bob Harvey
- Durham Havill
- David Hay
- Kirsten Hellier
- Gary Henley-Smith
- Joanne Henry
- John Henry
- Peter Henry
- Carolyn Henwood
- John Hickman
- Michael Hill
- Peter Hillary
- John Hinchcliff
- Wyn Hoadley
- Toni Hodgkinson
- Bronwen Holdsworth
- Beverley Holloway
- Peter Hooper
- Trevor Horne
- Parekura Horomia
- Rosie Horton
- Archie Houstoun
- Michael Houstoun
- Judy Howat
- Allan Hubbard
- Helen Hughes
- Keri Hulme
- Don Hunn
- Jonathan Hunt
- Pat Hunt
- Ian Hunter
- Lorrie Hunter
- Sid Hurst
- Les Hutchins

=== I ===
- Kīngi Īhaka
- Trevor Inch
- John Ingram
- Courtney Ireland
- Kevin Ireland
- Eddie Isbey
- Loimata Iupati

=== J ===
- Raewyn Jack
- June Jackson
- Billy T. James
- Taini Jamison
- Guy Jansen
- Ross Jansen
- Robin Janvrin
- Bill Jeffries
- John Jeffries
- Murray Jeffries
- Toni Jeffs
- Dorothy Jelicich
- Nikki Jenkins
- Philip Jensen
- Bob Jones
- Michael Jones
- Anne Judkins

=== K ===
- Kenneth Keith
- Cassandra Kelly
- Barbara Kendall
- Elspeth Kennedy
- Annette King
- Rex Kirton
- Gary Knapp
- Jim Knox
- Peggy Koopman-Boyden

=== L ===
- Bill Laney
- David Lange
- Reinhart Langer
- Phillippa Langrell
- Harry Lapwood
- Emily Latimer
- Graham Latimer
- Ed Latter
- Kevan Lawrence
- Julian Lawton
- David Lean
- David Ledson
- Graeme Lee
- Sandra Lee-Vercoe
- Dave Leech
- Nellie Leicester
- Susana Lemisio
- Douglas Lilburn
- Walter Lini
- Jack Willie Lipitoa
- John Lithgow
- Charles Philip Littlejohn
- Don Llewellyn
- Danyon Loader
- Richard Lockhart
- Ngātata Love
- Ralph Love
- Gavin Lovegrove
- Alf Lowe
- Di Lucas
- Salesio Lui
- Sybil Lupp
- Jack Luxton
- John Luxton
- Arthur Lydiard
- Patrick Lynch
- Peter Lynn

=== M ===
- Brian MacDonell
- Patrick Mahony
- Apirana Mahuika
- Malvina Major
- Aussie Malcolm
- Wilf Malcolm
- Emarina Manuel
- Denis Marshall
- Kerry Marshall
- Russell Marshall
- Clive Matthewson
- Bill Maung
- Richard Mayson
- Lesley Max
- Thaddeus McCarthy
- Malcolm McCaw
- Roger McClay
- David McGee
- Bill McIntosh
- Donald McIntyre
- Helene McIver
- Leo McKendry
- Mina McKenzie
- Ian McKinnon
- Jim McLay
- Alec McLean
- Ian McLean
- Joan Metge
- Ross Meurant
- Patrick Millen
- Bruce Miller
- Lorraine Moller
- Barbara Moore
- Garry Moore
- Mike Moore
- Helen Moros
- Andrew Mountbatten-Windsor (Note: Award of medal cancelled in December 2025.)
- Colin Moyle
- Tania Murray
- Selwyn Muru

=== N ===
- Allister Nalder
- Waka Nathan
- Brett Naylor
- Peter Neilson
- Yoka Neuman
- Chris Nicholson
- Colin Nicholson
- Ros Noonan
- Merv Norrish
- Richard Northey

=== O ===
- Gerald O'Brien
- Mary O'Connor
- Peter O'Donoghue
- Frank O'Flynn
- Katherine O'Regan
- Mike O'Rourke
- Alex O'Shea
- John O'Shea
- Phillip O'Shea
- Dave O'Sullivan
- W. H. Oliver
- Joe Ongley
- Claudia Orange
- Bob Owens

=== P ===
- Denis Pain
- Whatumoana Paki
- Bruce Palmer
- Geoffrey Palmer
- Pita Paraone
- Stuart Park
- Rose Pere
- Jim Peters
- Winston Peters
- Christine Pfitzinger
- Prince Philip, Duke of Edinburgh
- Tracy Phillips
- Alexia Pickering
- Simon Poelman
- Judith Potter
- Erenora Puketapu-Hetet

=== Q ===
- Derek Quigley
- Ian Quigley

=== R ===
- Beverley Reeves
- Paul Reeves
- Peter Renner
- Jack Ridley
- Diane Robertson
- Jeff Robson
- Brian Roche
- Leilani Rorani
- Jenny Rowan

=== S ===
- Laurie Salas
- Guy Salmon
- George Salmond
- Miriam Saphira
- Anand Satyanand
- Piri Sciascia
- Michelle Seymour
- Margaret Shields
- Peter Shirtcliffe
- Kevin Sheehy
- Brian Shorland
- Peter Skelton
- Robert Smellie
- Lockwood Smith
- Cheryll Sotheran
- Paul Spoonley
- Dryden Spring
- John Stapylton-Smith
- Evelyn Stokes
- Rob Storey
- Peter Sutherland
- Bill Sutton

=== T ===
- Rob Talbot
- Brian Talboys
- Jeff Tallon
- Howie Tamati
- Tangaroa Tangaroa
- Heather Tanguay
- Iritana Tāwhiwhirangi
- Hepi Te Heuheu
- Tumu Te Heuheu
- Diggeress Te Kanawa
- Kiri Te Kanawa
- Somerford Teagle
- John Terris
- Ted Thomas
- Geoff Thompson
- Thomas Thorp
- Lindsay Tisch
- Catherine Tizard
- Esme Tombleson
- David Tompkins

=== U ===
- Charles Upham

=== W ===
- Maureen Waaka
- Sean Wade
- Beverley Wakem
- John Walker
- Tim Wallis
- David Walter
- Marilyn Waring
- Mark Weldon
- Merv Wellington
- Koro Wētere
- Davina Whitehouse
- Cliff Whiting
- David Williams
- Haare Williams
- Peter Williams
- Joan Williamson-Orr
- Margaret Wilson
- Rex Wilson
- Ted Woodfield

=== Y ===
- Greg Yelavich
- Neville Young

=== Z ===
- Rachael Zister

== Bibliography ==
- New Zealand Official Year Book, 1990 (page 57)
