= Ted Keating =

New Zealand politician

Ted Keating CMG

Member of the New Zealand Parliament for Hastings
- In office 13 November 1954 – 26 November 1960
- Preceded by: Sydney Jones
- Succeeded by: Duncan MacIntyre

Personal details
- Born: 29 October 1910 Aldershot, England
- Died: 22 October 1987 (aged 76) Auckland, New Zealand
- Party: Labour
- Spouse: Rita Wigg (m. 1948)
- Children: 5
- Education: University of Auckland

Edwin Joseph Keating CMG (29 October 1910 – 22 October 1987) was a New Zealand Member of Parliament for the Labour Party, academic and director of the Bank of New Zealand.

== Biography ==
=== Early life and career ===
Keating was born in Aldershot, England, in 1910 and arrived in New Zealand in 1926 alongside family members. He found employment with the New Zealand Post Office and attended the University of Auckland part-time, eventually graduating with a master of arts majoring in history.

He married Marguerita Mary (Rita) Wigg in Dunedin on 29 March 1948 with whom he had four sons and one daughter.

He was vice-president of the New Zealand Post Office Association from 1949 to 1954 and a member of the Post Office Promotion Board from 1950 to 1954. He was a member of the Government Superannuation Board from 1948 to 1953.

=== Political career ===
New Zealand Parliament
Years	Term	Electorate	Party
1954–1957	31st	Hastings	Labour
1957–1960	32nd	Hastings	Labour

At the 1953 local-body elections he stood unsuccessfully for the Wellington Harbour Board on the Labour Party ticket.

Keating represented the Hastings electorate from 1954 to 1960, when he was defeated by National's Duncan MacIntyre. He attempted to regain the seat in 1963, but was unsuccessful. Keating was thought of as a potential cabinet member at the formation of the Second Labour Government. The press thought him the most qualified member of the Labour caucus for the position of Postmaster-General due to his work experience prior to entering Parliament. However he was not selected for cabinet and remained a backbencher. For the duration of the government Keating defended the government's record and countered attacks from the opposition regarding taxation levels. He particularly highlighted the success of the introduction of the Pay-as-you-earn tax (PAYE) as an improvement to the tax system in place prior to Labour taking office.

He was a member of the Labour Party's national executive from 1957 to 1960 and chairman of the Wellington Labour Party Division from 1968 to 1975. In 1969 Keating stood for the vice-presidency of the Labour Party. He gained minimal support with only 2 delegates voting for him in the ballot.

=== Later career ===
After politics he became a tutor and senior lecturer in industrial relations at Victoria University of Wellington. Keating also served as a director of the Bank of New Zealand from 1975 to 1987. He had previously been a member of the bank's housing allocation committee from 1947 to 1960.

In the 1986 Queen's Birthday Honours, Keating was appointed a Companion of the Order of St Michael and St George, for public and community services.

=== Death ===
He died in 1987 in Wellington a week before his 77th birthday after a lengthy illness. He was survived by his wife, five children and three grandchildren.

== Notes ==
New Zealand Parliament
Preceded by Sydney Jones	Member of Parliament for Hastings; 1954–1960	Succeeded by Duncan MacIntyre
