= Colleen Dewe =

New Zealand politician

Member of the New Zealand Parliament for Lyttelton
- In office 1975–1978
- Preceded by: Tom McGuigan
- Succeeded by: Ann Hercus

Personal details
- Born: 30 May 1930 Hokitika
- Died: 22 May 1993 (aged 62) Dunedin
- Party: National
- Profession: Chartered Accountant

Colleen Elizabeth Dewe (30 May 1930 – 22 May 1993) was a New Zealand politician of the National Party. She and Marilyn Waring were the 14th and 15th women elected to the New Zealand Parliament, and she represented the Lyttelton electorate for one parliamentary term from 1975 until her defeat in 1978.

== Early life ==
Dewe was born in Hokitika in 1930. Her father was Leonard George Reginald Dewe and her mother was Marjory Dewe (née Armstrong; married 1922). She received her education at the Christchurch Normal School, at Christchurch West High School, and at the University of Canterbury. She was an Associate Chartered Accountant.

== Professional life ==
Dewe was head clerk for the Christchurch company Lake & Lake from 1956 to 1958. From 1958 to 1963, she was an accountant and secretary for Flight Equipment Ltd in the United Kingdom. She was office manager for Lawrence, Godfrey & Company in Christchurch from 1964 to 1975.

== Political career ==
New Zealand Parliament
Years	Term	Electorate	Party
1975–1978	38th	Lyttelton	National

She represented the Lyttelton electorate from 1975 to 1978, when she was defeated by Ann Hercus. She told fellow MP Marilyn Waring that she had never been subject to discrimination throughout her life, to which Waring asked whether she had ever attended one of the dinners of the annual New Zealand Accountants conference. Those dinners were for men only, and Waring believes that Dewe never stated again that she wasn't a feminist. Dewe was a resident of Sumner while she was an MP.

== Later life ==
After her defeat in 1978, she was appointed as Deputy Chair of the Commerce Commission, filling the vacancy left as a result of Ann Hercus being elected to Parliament. She retired from the Commerce Commission in 1988. She served as the chairwoman of the Advisory Committee of Women's Affairs from 1980 to 1984 and lead the New Zealand delegation to the 1980 Vienna conference on the status of women. She was awarded the Queen Elizabeth II Silver Jubilee Medal in 1977, and the New Zealand 1990 Commemoration Medal in 1990. Dewe was awarded a Fellowship of the Society of Accountants in 1982 for her lifelong interest in accountancy.

New Zealand Parliament
Preceded by Tom McGuigan	Member of Parliament for Lyttelton; 1975–1978	Succeeded by Ann Hercus
