= Ted Cullen =

New Zealand politician (1895–1963)

The Honourable Ted Cullen MM
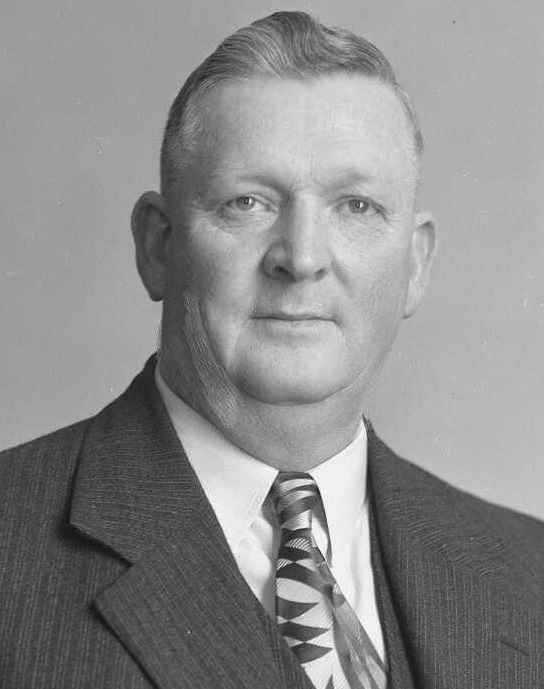

18th Minister of Agriculture
- In office 19 December 1946 – 13 December 1949
- Prime Minister: Peter Fraser
- Preceded by: Ben Roberts
- Succeeded by: Keith Holyoake

Member of the New Zealand Parliament for Hawkes Bay
- In office 27 November 1935 – 27 November 1946
- Preceded by: Hugh Campbell
- Succeeded by: Cyril Harker

Personal details
- Born: 5 September 1895 Havelock North, New Zealand
- Died: 18 February 1963 (aged 67) Hastings, New Zealand
- Party: Labour
- Awards: Military Medal

Military service
- Allegiance: New Zealand Army
- Rank: Sergeant
- Battles/wars: World War I

Edward Luttrell Cullen MM (5 September 1895 – 18 February 1963) was a New Zealand politician of the Labour Party, and a cabinet minister in the First Labour Government.

== Biography ==
=== Early life ===
Cullen was born in Havelock North, and educated at Nuhaka Native School and Napier Boys' High School. He joined the NZEF as a Rifleman then Sergeant (No 12356) in World War I, and was awarded the Military Medal for bravery.

He farmed at Wairoa and became Director of the Wairoa Co-operative Dairy Company. In this position he actively assisted returned servicemen and local Māori in becoming farmers.

=== Political career ===
New Zealand Parliament
Years	Term	Electorate	Party
1935–1938	25th	Hawkes Bay	Labour
1938–1943	26th	Hawkes Bay	Labour
1943–1946	27th	Hawkes Bay	Labour
1946–1949	28th	Hastings	Labour

He represented the Hawkes Bay electorate from 1935 to 1946, having stood there unsuccessfully in 1931. In 1946, following an electoral redistribution, he won the Hastings electorate, but was defeated in 1949.

He was Minister of Agriculture from 1946 to 1949 and also Minister of Marketing from 1947 to 1949. He was a self described militarist and supported compulsory military training, an issue to which most Labour members were opposed.

=== Later life and death ===
After leaving Parliament he resumed farming and became a business partner of Sir James Wattie, producing many of the fruit and vegetables that were processed at the Wattie's cannery. He was approached several times to return to politics, but he declined.

Cullen died in Hastings on 18 February 1963, aged 67.

== Notes ==
Political offices
Preceded by Ben Roberts	Minister of Agriculture; 1946–1949	Succeeded by Keith Holyoake
New Zealand Parliament
Preceded by Hugh Campbell	Member of Parliament for Hawkes Bay; 1935–1946	Succeeded by Cyril Harker
New constituency	Member of Parliament for Hastings; 1946–1949	Succeeded by Sydney Jones
