= Minister of Agriculture (New Zealand) =

New Zealand minister of the Crown

- Coat of Arms of New Zealand

- Flag of New Zealand

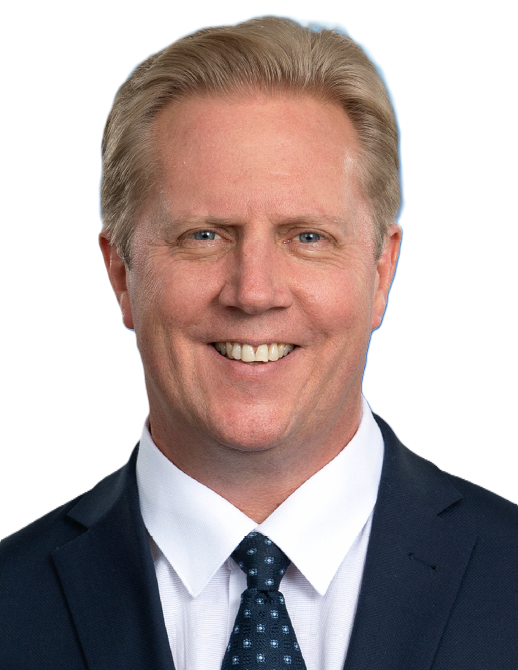
- Incumbent; Todd McClay since 27 November 2023
- Ministry for Primary Industries
- Style: The Honourable
- Member of: Cabinet of New Zealand; Executive Council
- Reports to: Prime Minister of New Zealand
- Appointer: Governor-General of New Zealand
- Term length: At His Majesty's pleasure
- Formation: 17 October 1889
- First holder: George Richardson
- Salary: $288,900
- Website: www.beehive.govt.nz

The Minister of Agriculture is a minister in the New Zealand Government. It was re-created as a standalone portfolio in 2017 after previously existing continuously from 1889 to 1998, and again from 1999 to 2012. The current Minister is Todd McClay.

== Responsibilities and powers ==
The minister's responsibilities include protecting and promoting the productivity, sustainability and export performance of New Zealand's agricultural sector. They are also the lead minister for the Ministry for Primary Industries, which is the government department that provides support to the portfolio. Previously the minister was responsible for smaller departments such as the Ministry of Agriculture and Forestry.

The minister is responsible for legislation related to the agricultural sector including the Animal Welfare Act 1999 and the Dairy Industry Restructuring Act 2001.

== History ==
John McKenzie established the Department of Agriculture on 31 March 1892, and the first minister, George Richardson, was appointed on 17 October 1889. Prior to Keith Holyoake receiving it in 1949, the portfolio "had become notorious as a political graveyard". The fisheries portfolio was briefly combined in the agriculture portfolio between 1972 and 1977.

In the Shipley minority government, the position was disestablished and replaced with the new role of Minister of Food, Fibre, Biosecurity and Border Control, which consolidated ministerial responsibility for the Ministry of Agriculture and Forestry, Ministry of Fisheries, Land Information New Zealand and the New Zealand Customs Service. The change was unpopular with the farming sector and was reverted by the incoming Labour government in 1999.

In the second and third terms of the Fifth National Government, the portfolio was again disestablished and merged into the larger position of Minister for Primary Industries. A standalone agriculture ministerial position was restored in 2017.

== List of ministers of agriculture ==
Key

Independent Liberal Reform United Labour National Progressive

No.	Name	Portrait	Term of office		Prime Minister
1	George Richardson		17 October 1889	24 January 1891	Atkinson
2	John McKenzie		24 January 1891	27 June 1900	Ballance
2	John McKenzie		24 January 1891	27 June 1900	Seddon
3	Tom Duncan		2 July 1900	6 August 1906	Seddon
3	Tom Duncan		2 July 1900	6 August 1906	Hall-Jones
4	Robert McNab		6 August 1906	30 November 1908	Ward
5	Joseph Ward		1 December 1908	1 May 1909	Ward
6	Thomas Mackenzie		1 May 1909	10 July 1912	Ward
6	Thomas Mackenzie		1 May 1909	10 July 1912	Mackenzie
7	William Massey		10 July 1912	12 August 1915	Massey
8	William MacDonald		12 August 1915	22 August 1919	Massey
9	William Nosworthy		4 September 1919	18 January 1926	Massey
9	William Nosworthy		4 September 1919	18 January 1926	Bell
9	William Nosworthy		4 September 1919	18 January 1926	Coates
10	Oswald Hawken		18 January 1926	24 August 1928	Coates
11	George Forbes		10 December 1928	28 May 1930	Ward
12	Alfred Murdoch		28 May 1930	22 September 1931	Forbes
13	David Jones		22 September 1931	8 January 1932	Forbes
14	Charles Macmillan		8 January 1932	6 December 1935	Forbes
15	Lee Martin		6 December 1935	21 January 1941	Savage
15	Lee Martin		6 December 1935	21 January 1941	Fraser
16	Jim Barclay		21 January 1941	18 October 1943	Fraser
17	Ben Roberts		29 October 1943	19 December 1946	Fraser
18	Ted Cullen		19 December 1946	13 December 1949	Fraser
19	Keith Holyoake		13 December 1949	26 September 1957	Holland
20	Sid Smith		26 September 1957	12 December 1957	Holland
20	Sid Smith		26 September 1957	12 December 1957	Holyoake
21	Jerry Skinner		12 December 1957	12 December 1960	Nash
22	William Gillespie		12 December 1960	23 April 1961	Holyoake
23	Thomas Hayman		2 May 1961	2 January 1962	Holyoake
24	Brian Talboys		24 January 1962	22 December 1969	Holyoake
25	Douglas Carter		22 December 1969	8 December 1972	Holyoake
25	Douglas Carter		22 December 1969	8 December 1972	Marshall
26	Colin Moyle (Note: as Minister of Agriculture and Fisheries)		8 December 1972	12 December 1975	Kirk
26	Colin Moyle		8 December 1972	12 December 1975	Rowling
27	Duncan MacIntyre (Note: as Minister of Agriculture and Fisheries until 8 March 1977)		12 December 1975	26 July 1984	Muldoon
(26)	Colin Moyle		26 July 1984	9 February 1990	Lange
(26)	Colin Moyle		26 July 1984	9 February 1990	Palmer
28	Jim Sutton		9 February 1990	2 November 1990	Palmer
28	Jim Sutton		9 February 1990	2 November 1990	Moore
29	John Falloon		2 November 1990	29 February 1996	Bolger
30	Lockwood Smith		29 February 1996	26 August 1998	Bolger
30	Lockwood Smith		29 February 1996	26 August 1998	Shipley
31	John Luxton (Note: as Minister of Food, Fibre and Biosecurity)		26 August 1998	10 December 1999	Shipley
(28)	Jim Sutton		10 December 1999	19 October 2005	Clark
32	Jim Anderton		19 October 2005	19 November 2008	Clark
33	David Carter		19 November 2008	14 December 2011	Key
2011–2017: No separate appointments
34	Damien O'Connor		26 October 2017	27 November 2023	Ardern
34	Damien O'Connor		26 October 2017	27 November 2023	Hipkins
35	Todd McClay		27 November 2023	present	Luxon

Table footnotes:

== See also ==
- Minister for Primary Industries
