= Minister of Forestry (New Zealand) =

New Zealand minister of the Crown

Minister of Forestry of New Zealand
- Coat of Arms of New Zealand

- Flag of New Zealand

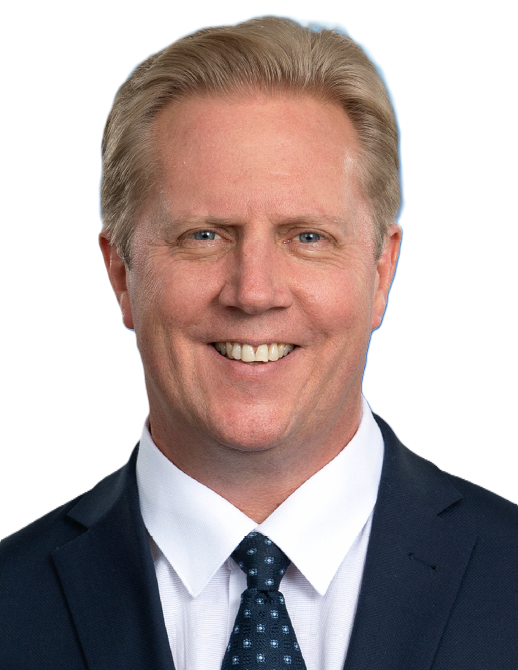
- Incumbent; Todd McClay since 27 November 2023
- Style: The Honourable
- Member of: Cabinet of New Zealand; Executive Council
- Reports to: Prime Minister of New Zealand
- Appointer: Governor-General of New Zealand
- Term length: At His Majesty's pleasure
- Formation: 1 May 1893
- First holder: John McKenzie
- Salary: $288,900
- Website: www.beehive.govt.nz

The Minister of Forestry is a minister in the New Zealand Government. The portfolio was created in 1893 as Commissioner of Forests, being renamed Commissioner of State Forests in 1922 before finally having the title altered from Commissioner to Minister in 1949.

The present Minister is Todd McClay.

== List of ministers ==
The following ministers held the office of Minister of Forestry.

Key

Liberal Reform United Labour National Progressive NZ First

No.	Name	Portrait	Term of office		Prime Minister
1	John McKenzie		1 May 1893	27 June 1900	Seddon
2	Tom Duncan		2 July 1900	21 June 1906	Seddon
No separate appointments
3	Thomas Mackenzie		6 January 1909	10 July 1912	Ward
3	Thomas Mackenzie		6 January 1909	10 July 1912	Mackenzie
4	Francis Bell		10 July 1912	21 February 1922	Massey
5	Heaton Rhodes		21 February 1922	18 January 1926	Massey
5	Heaton Rhodes		21 February 1922	18 January 1926	Bell
5	Heaton Rhodes		21 February 1922	18 January 1926	Coates
6	Oswald Hawken		18 January 1926	26 November 1928	Coates
7	Kenneth Williams		28 November 1928	10 December 1928	Coates
8	William Taverner		19 December 1928	28 May 1930	Ward
9	Alfred Ransom		28 May 1930	6 December 1935	Forbes
10	Frank Langstone		6 December 1935	21 December 1942	Savage
10	Frank Langstone		6 December 1935	21 December 1942	Fraser
11	Jim Barclay		7 July 1943	18 October 1943	Fraser
12	Jerry Skinner		12 April 1944	13 December 1949	Fraser
13	Ernest Corbett		13 December 1949	26 November 1954	Holland
14	Sid Smith		26 November 1954	26 September 1957	Holland
14	Sid Smith		26 November 1954	26 September 1957	Holyoake
15	Geoff Gerard		26 September 1957	12 December 1957	Holyoake
16	Eruera Tirikatene		12 December 1957	12 December 1960	Nash
(15)	Geoff Gerard		12 December 1960	12 December 1966	Holyoake
17	Duncan MacIntyre		12 December 1966	8 December 1972	Holyoake
17	Duncan MacIntyre		12 December 1966	8 December 1972	Marshall
18	Colin Moyle		8 December 1972	12 December 1975	Kirk
18	Colin Moyle		8 December 1972	12 December 1975	Rowling
19	Venn Young		12 December 1975	11 December 1981	Muldoon
20	Jonathan Elworthy		11 December 1981	26 July 1984	Muldoon
21	Koro Wētere		26 July 1984	24 July 1987	Lange
22	Peter Tapsell		24 July 1987	9 February 1990	Lange
22	Peter Tapsell		24 July 1987	9 February 1990	Palmer
23	Jim Sutton		9 February 1990	2 November 1990	Palmer
23	Jim Sutton		9 February 1990	2 November 1990	Moore
24	John Falloon		2 November 1990	16 December 1996	Bolger
25	Lockwood Smith		16 December 1996	31 August 1998	Bolger
25	Lockwood Smith		16 December 1996	31 August 1998	Shipley
26	John Luxton		31 August 1998	10 December 1999	Shipley
27	Pete Hodgson		10 December 1999	15 August 2002	Clark
(23)	Jim Sutton		15 August 2002	21 December 2004	Clark
28	Jim Anderton		21 December 2004	19 November 2008	Clark
29	David Carter		19 November 2008	14 December 2011	Key
2011–2017: No separate appointments
30	Shane Jones		26 October 2017	6 November 2020	Ardern
31	Stuart Nash		6 November 2020	28 March 2023	Ardern
31	Stuart Nash		6 November 2020	28 March 2023	Hipkins
–	Megan Woods		28 March 2023	12 April 2023	Hipkins
32	Peeni Henare		12 April 2023	27 November 2023	Hipkins
33	Todd McClay		27 November 2023	present	Luxon

== See also ==
- Minister for Primary Industries
