= Jeff Whittaker =

New Zealand politician

New Zealand Parliament
| Years | Term | Electorate | Party |
|---|---|---|---|
| 1990–1993 | 43rd | Hastings | National |

Jeffrey William Whittaker (born 1940) is a former New Zealand politician of the National Party.

Whittaker was a local government politician in the Havelock North Borough Council, serving as Mayor for several terms before Local Government changes saw the dissolution of the council into larger District Council areas in 1989. From 2005 onwards Whittaker became the last living member of the old Havelock North Borough Council.

He represented the electorate of Hastings in Parliament from 1990 to 1993, when he chose not to stand for re-election and returned to his prior occupation of pharmacist. He had previously contested the seat unsuccessfully in 1987. In 1993 the seat of Hastings was won by Labour candidate Rick Barker.

He was born in Hamilton. He is one of six one-term National MPs who were elected in a swing against Labour in the 1990 election.

Whittaker has stated that his time in sitting on Parliamentary Select Committees was mostly unproductive due to his belief that, "The bureaucrats tend to run everything and to penetrate the bureaucratic morass is nigh on impossible."

Since he retired at the 1993 election Whittaker returned to Havelock North running a post office, vineyard and pharmacy.

== Notes ==
New Zealand Parliament
| Preceded by David Butcher | Member of Parliament for Hastings; 1990–1993 | Succeeded by Rick Barker |
