= Ben Roberts (politician) =

New Zealand politician (1880–1952)

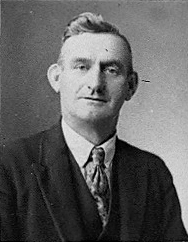
Benjamin Roberts in 1935.

Benjamin Roberts (1880 – 17 November 1952) was a New Zealand politician of the Labour Party and a Cabinet Minister.

== Biography ==
New Zealand Parliament
Years	Term	Electorate	Party
1935–1938	25th	Wairarapa	Labour
1938–1943	26th	Wairarapa	Labour
1943–1946	27th	Wairarapa	Labour

Roberts was born in 1880 in Liverpool. He started work as a farm labourer at 13. He brought his family to New Zealand in 1907 and settled in Carterton.

He was elected to Parliament in the Wairarapa electorate in 1935, and remained a member of parliament to 1946, when he retired.

He was both Minister of Agriculture and Minister of Marketing, from 1943 to 1946 in the First Labour Government under Peter Fraser.

Roberts died in 1952. His first wife, Mary Roberts, had died in 1936.

== Notes ==
Political offices
Preceded by Jim Barclay	Minister of Agriculture; 1943–1946	Succeeded by Ted Cullen
New Zealand Parliament
Preceded by Alex McLeod	Member of Parliament for Wairarapa; 1935–1949	Succeeded by Bert Cooksley
