= John Elliott (New Zealand politician) =

New Zealand politician (1938–2022)

John Elliott QSM
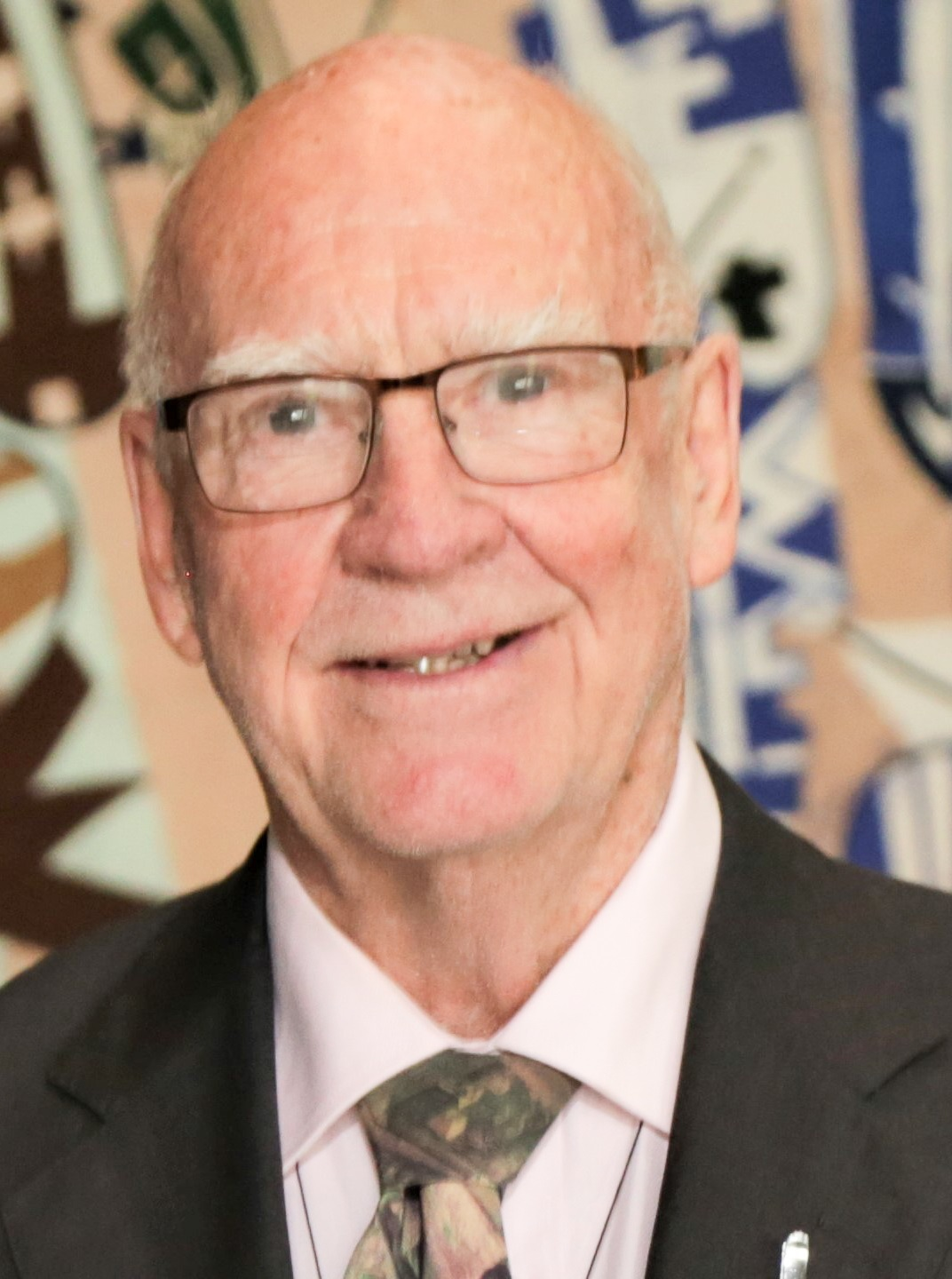
- Elliott in 2019

Member of the New Zealand Parliament for Whangarei
- In office 1975–1981
- Preceded by: Murray Robert Smith
- Succeeded by: John Banks

Personal details
- Born: John Gordon Elliott; 5 November 1938 Whangārei, New Zealand
- Died: 12 July 2022 (aged 83)
- Party: National (?–1981); Independent (1981–?); Green (?–2022)
- Occupation: Schoolteacher, newsletter publisher

John Gordon Elliott QSM (5 November 1938 – 12 July 2022) was a New Zealand politician of the National Party.

== Biography ==
=== Early life and career ===
Elliott was born in 1938 in Whangārei. He received his education at Kamo Primary School, Whangarei Boys' High School and at the University of Auckland. He obtained an MA (Hons) in 1973 and a diploma in teaching. He was a teacher from 1959 until 1975 and started at his own high school in Whangārei. For his last two years in the profession, he was deputy principal of Bayfield School.

In 1966, he married Jillian Margaret Mullenger. They had two sons.

=== Political career ===
New Zealand Parliament
Years	Term	Electorate	Party
1975–1978	38th	Whangarei	National
1978–1981	39th	Whangarei	National

He won the Whangarei electorate from Murray Robert Smith in 1975 and was re-elected in 1978, but failed to win the reselection by the National Party in 1981, who instead chose John Banks. Instead, Elliott stood in the New Lynn electorate as an independent in the 1981 election against the incumbent from the Labour Party, Jonathan Hunt, but he was unsuccessful.

=== Later life and death ===
In 1989, Elliott launched his newsletter business. which included the monthly publication Ponsonby Community Newsletter. He ran the business under Bayfield Services Limited. In 2004, Elliott sold the publication to publisher Martin Leach, who changed the name to Ponsonby News.

Elliott died on 12 July 2022. At the time of his death, he was a member of the Green Party.

== Honours and awards ==
In 1977, Elliott was awarded the Queen Elizabeth II Silver Jubilee Medal, and in 1990 he received the New Zealand 1990 Commemoration Medal.

Elliott was awarded the Queen's Service Medal in the 2019 New Year Honours, for services to the community.

== Notes ==
New Zealand Parliament
Preceded by Murray Robert Smith	Member of Parliament for Whangarei; 1975–1981	Succeeded by John Banks
