= Sydney Jones (politician) =

New Zealand politician (1894–1982)

Sydney Ionoval Jones (23 May 1894 – 28 April 1982) was a New Zealand politician of the National Party.

== Early life ==
Jones was born in 1894 at Makotoku, a locality some 68 miles (109 km) south of Napier in the Waipawa district. He received his education from Hastings High School, Napier Boys' High School, Wellington Teachers' Training College, and Victoria University College. Prior to finishing his tertiary education, he enrolled with the Samoan Expeditionary Force in 1914. Between 1916 and 1919, he went with the New Zealand Expeditionary Force (NZEF) to France, Belgium, and Germany. He completed his studies after the war and graduated from Victoria with an MA (Hons) in economics.

Jones then went teaching, first at Marlborough College and then at Hastings High School, where he became first assistant. In Hastings, he was president of the Old Boys Football Club and the local Returned Services' Association (RSA).

== Political career ==
New Zealand Parliament
Years	Term	Electorate	Party
1949–1951	29th	Hastings	National
1951–1954	30th	Hastings	National

He won the Hastings electorate in the 1949 election from Labour's Ted Cullen, but was defeated by Labour's Ted Keating in 1954.

In 1953, Jones was awarded the Queen Elizabeth II Coronation Medal.

Jones died in 1982, and was buried at Hastings Cemetery.

== Notes ==
New Zealand Parliament
Preceded by Ted Cullen	Member of Parliament for Hastings; 1949–1954	Succeeded by Ted Keating
