= 1975 New Zealand general election =

General election in New Zealand

- 29 November 1975

87 seats in the Parliament 44 seats needed for a majority
- Turnout: 1,603,733 (82.11%) ▼
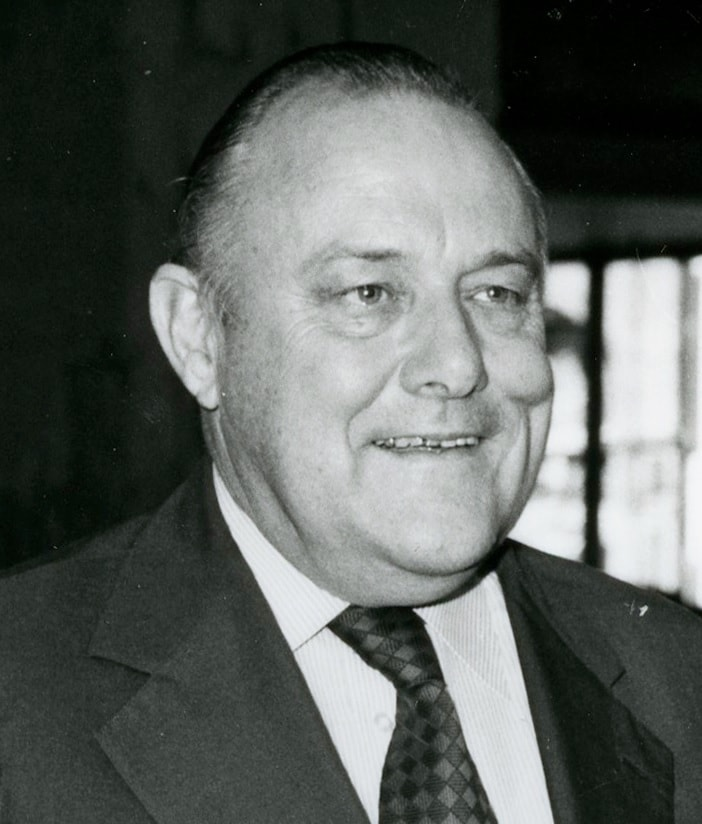

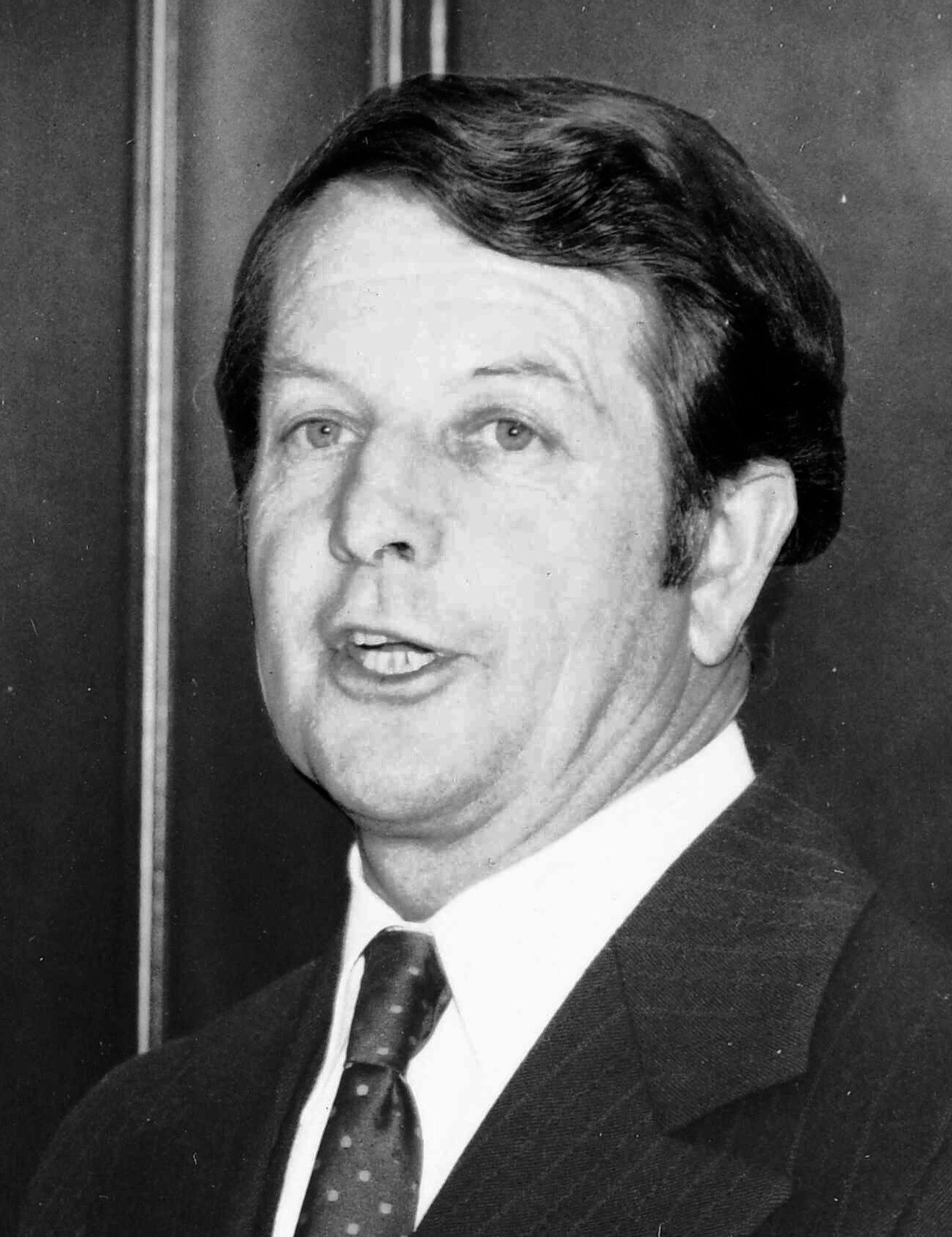
	First party	Second party
Leader	Robert Muldoon	Bill Rowling
Party	National	Labour
Leader since	9 July 1974	6 September 1974
Leader's seat	Tamaki	Tasman
Last election	32 seats, 41.5%	55 seats, 48.4%
Seats won	55	32
Seat change	▲23	▼23
Popular vote	763,136	634,453
Percentage	47.6%	39.6%
Swing	▲6.1%	▼8.8%
- Results by electorate, shaded by winning margin
Prime Minister before election
Bill Rowling
Labour
Subsequent Prime Minister
Robert Muldoon
National

The 1975 New Zealand general election was held on 29 November to elect MPs to the 38th session of the New Zealand Parliament. It was the first general election in New Zealand where 18- to 20-year-olds and all permanent residents of New Zealand were eligible to vote, although only citizens were able to be elected.

The National Party, led by Rob Muldoon, won 55 of the 87 seats over the Labour Party, led by Bill Rowling, in a landslide. The election saw the defeat of the Third Labour Government after only three years in office and the formation of the Third National Government. As of 2026, this is the most recent election where a government was voted out after one term.

== Background ==
The incumbent Labour Party's decline in popularity during the previous term had as factors the death of its leader, Norman Kirk, economic decline triggered by the United Kingdom's accession to the European Communities—most importantly the European Economic Community (EEC)—and the 1973 oil crisis.

Following the sudden death of Labour leader Kirk, the party was led by Bill Rowling, a leader who was characterised as being weak and ineffectual by some political commentators. Labour's central campaign was the so-called "Citizens for Rowling" petition which attacked National leader Robert Muldoon's forthright leadership style. This campaign was largely seen as having backfired on Labour.

The National Party responded with the formation of "Rob's Mob". As former Minister of Finance in the previous National government, Muldoon focused on the economic impact of Labour's policies; National's campaign advertising suggested that Labour's recently introduced compulsory personal superannuation scheme would result in the government owning the New Zealand economy by using the worker's money, akin to a communist state. Muldoon argued that his New Zealand superannuation scheme could be funded from future taxes rather than an additional tax on current wages.

In July 1974, Muldoon as opposition leader had promised to cut immigration and to "get tough" on law and order issues. He criticised the Labour government's immigration policies for contributing to the economic recession and a housing shortage which undermined the New Zealand "way of life".

During the 1975 general elections, the National Party had also played an electoral advertisement that was later criticized for stoking negative racial sentiments about Polynesian migrants.

The campaign also achieved notoriety due to an infamous television commercial featuring "Dancing Cossacks", which was produced by Hanna Barbera on behalf of National's ad agency Colenso.

=== MPs retiring in 1975 ===
Four National MPs and Three Labour MPs intended to retire at the end of the 37th Parliament:

Party	Name	Electorate	Term of office	Date announced
National	Percy Allen	Bay of Plenty	1957–75	before 20 August 1974
National	Logan Sloane	Hobson	1960–66; 1969–75	22 April 1974
National	Sir Jack Marshall	Karori	1946–75	20 December 1974
National	Douglas Carter	Raglan	1957–75	5 August 1974
Labour	Norman Douglas	Auckland Central	1960–75	16 October 1974
Labour	Ethel McMillan	Dunedin North	1953–75	17 October 1974
Labour	Hugh Watt	Onehunga	1953–75	20 June 1975

== Opinion polling ==
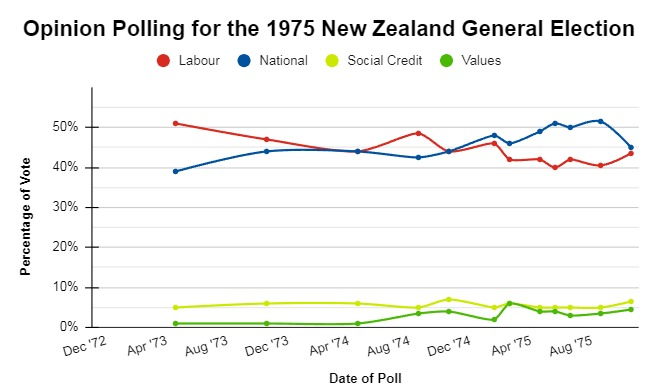

Poll	Date (Note: These are the survey dates of the poll, or if the survey dates are not stated, the date the poll was released.)	National	Labour	Socred	Values	Lead
1975 election result	29 Nov 1975	47.59	39.56	7.43	5.19	8.03
NRB	Nov 1975	46	44	6	4	2
TVNZ Heylen	Nov 1975	44	43	7	5	1
NRB	Sep 1975	52	39	5	4	13
TVNZ Heylen	Sep 1975	51	42	5	3	9
TVNZ Heylen	Jul 1975	50	42	5	3	8
NRB	Jul 1975	51	40	5	4	11
TVNZ Heylen	May 1975	49	42	5	4	7
NRB	Mar 1975	46	42	6	6	4
TVNZ Heylen	Feb 1975	48	46	5	2	2
NRB	Nov 1974	44	44	7	4	Tie
TVNZ Heylen	Sep 1974	45	47	5	3	2
NRB	Sep 1974	40	50	5	4	10
N/A	31 August 1974	Death of Prime Minister Norman Kirk, Bill Rowling Becomes Prime Minister				
NRB	May 1974	44	44	5	5	Tie
NRB	Nov 1973	44	47	6	1	3
NRB	May 1973	39	51	5	1	12
1972 election result	25 Nov 1972	41.50	48.37	6.65	1.96	6.87

== Results ==
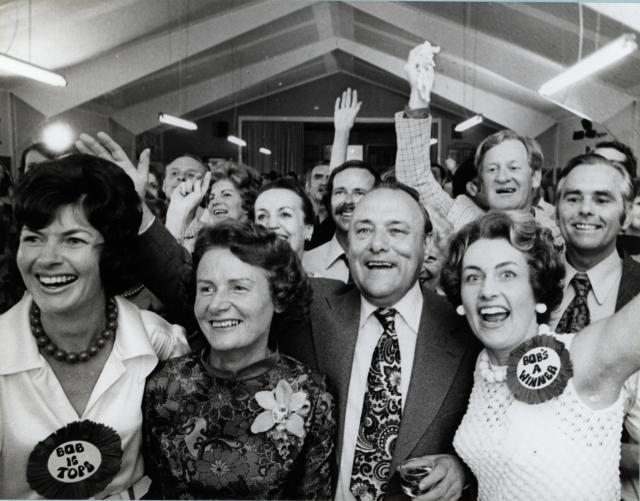
Celebrating on election night

The final results saw National win 55 seats, and Labour 32 seats. The party seat numbers were an exact opposite of the 1972 election, when Labour won 55 seats to National's 32. This election also represented the biggest swing against a sitting government since 1935, outdoing the previous record set in 1972.

Robert Muldoon replaced Bill Rowling as Prime Minister, ending the term of the Third Labour government, and beginning the term of the Third National government. No minor parties won seats, though the election saw the best ever result for New Zealand's first green political party, Values. There were 1,953,050 electors on the roll, with 1,603,733 (82.11%) voting.

While Muldoon would be re-elected twice, this would be the only time between 1969 and 1990 that National polled more votes than Labour.

Notable electorate results included the election of two Māori MPs to general seats; the first time that any Māori had been elected to a non-Māori electorate since James Carroll in 1893. The MPs in question were Ben Couch in Wairarapa and Rex Austin in Awarua.

In Palmerston North and Western Hutt, Labour was first on election night but lost when special votes were counted.

Party	Candidates	Total votes	Percentage	Seats won	Change
National	87	763,136	47.59	55	+23
Labour	87	634,453	39.56	32	-23
Social Credit	87	119,147	7.43	0	±0
Values	87	83,241	5.19	0	±0
Socialist Unity	15	408	0.03	0	±0
National Socialist	1	19	0.00	-	±0
Independent	67	3,756	0.23	0	±0
Total	415	1,603,733		87	

=== Votes summary ===
Popular Vote
National	47.59%
Labour	39.56%
Social Credit	7.43%
Values	5.19%
Independents	0.23%

Parliament seats
National	63.22%
Labour	36.78%

The table below shows the results of the 1975 general election:

Key

National Labour Social Credit

Electorate results for the 1975 New Zealand general election
Electorate	Incumbent	Winner	Majority	Runner up
General electorates
Auckland Central	Norman Douglas	Richard Prebble	289	Murray McCully
Avon	Mary Batchelor		5,503	Tom George
Awarua	Aubrey Begg	Rex Austin	2,150	Aubrey Begg
Bay of Plenty	Percy Allen	Duncan MacIntyre	3,960	Robert Frederick McKee
Birkenhead	Norman King	Jim McLay	2,816	Norman King
Christchurch Central	Bruce Barclay		2,973	Tim Armitage
Clutha	Peter Gordon		4,735	F A O'Connell
Coromandel	Leo Schultz		4,724	Raymond C. Bradley
Dunedin Central	Brian MacDonell		1,428	Ian Bright
Dunedin North	Ethel McMillan	Richard Walls	958	Brian Arnold
East Coast Bays	Frank Gill		5,594	Rex Stanton
Eden	Mike Moore	Aussie Malcolm	1,331	Mike Moore
Egmont	Venn Young		4,120	Dennis Duggan
Franklin	Bill Birch		7,605	Ron Ng-Waishing
Gisborne	Trevor Davey	Bob Bell	1,321	Trevor Davey
Grey Lynn	Eddie Isbey		2,839	Jens Meder
Hamilton East	Rufus Rogers	Ian Shearer	2,246	Rufus Rogers
Hamilton West	Dorothy Jelicich	Mike Minogue	2,069	Dorothy Jelicich
Hastings	Richard Mayson	Bob Fenton	491	Richard Mayson
Hawkes Bay	Richard Harrison		3,805	David Butcher
Henderson	Martyn Finlay		401	Warren Adams
Heretaunga	Ron Bailey		336	Julie Cameron
Hobson	Logan Sloane	Neill Austin	4,101	Howard Manning (Note: David Lange came third for Labour in Hobson)
Hutt	Trevor Young		1,019	Brett Newell
Invercargill	J. B. Munro	Norman Jones	2,533	J. B. Munro
Island Bay	Gerald O'Brien		1,274	Bill Nathan
Kapiti	Frank O'Flynn	Barry Brill	2,222	Frank O'Flynn
Karori	Jack Marshall	Hugh Templeton	4,830	Margaret Shields
King Country	Jim Bolger		4,316	Thomas Varnam
Lyttelton	Tom McGuigan	Colleen Dewe	999	Tom McGuigan
Manawatu	Allan McCready		2,918	Alan Charles Eyles
Mangere	Colin Moyle		1,604	Stanley Lawson
Manukau	Roger Douglas		678	Brian Leaming
Manurewa	Phil Amos	Merv Wellington	1,358	Phil Amos
Marlborough	Ian Brooks	Ed Latter	3,010	Ian Brooks
Miramar	Bill Young		1,749	John Wybrow
Mt Albert	Warren Freer		247	Frank Ryan
Napier	Gordon Christie		931	John Isles
Nelson	Stan Whitehead		1,093	Ian McWhannel
New Lynn	Jonathan Hunt		890	Barry O'Connor
New Plymouth	Ron Barclay	Tony Friedlander	1,935	Ron Barclay
North Shore	George Gair		5,247	Wyn Hoadley
Oamaru	Bill Laney	Jonathan Elworthy	2,196	Bill Laney
Onehunga	Hugh Watt	Frank Rogers	1,044	Kevin O'Brien
Otago Central	Ian Quigley	Warren Cooper	2,371	Ian Quigley
Otahuhu	Bob Tizard		3,785	Lois Morris
Pahiatua	Keith Holyoake		6,769	Paul Thornicroft
Pakuranga	Gavin Downie		7,016	Geoff Braybrooke
Palmerston North	Joe Walding	John Lithgow	142	Joe Walding
Papanui	Bert Walker		2,985	Rod Garden
Petone	Fraser Colman		2,834	Brel Gluyas
Piako	Jack Luxton		6,174	Helen Clark
Porirua	Gerry Wall		2,265	Ross Doughty
Raglan	Douglas Carter	Marilyn Waring	3,756	Bill Pickering
Rakaia	Colin McLachlan		5,237	Graeme Lowrie
Rangiora	Kerry Burke	Derek Quigley	1,386	Kerry Burke
Rangitikei	Roy Jack		1,756	Bruce Beetham
Remuera	Allan Highet		8,656	G B Mead
Riccarton	Eric Holland		4,766	Don Johnson
Rodney	Peter Wilkinson		7,817	John Prebble
Roskill	Arthur Faulkner		530	John Maurice Priestley
Rotorua	Harry Lapwood		3,605	Peter Tapsell
Ruahine	Les Gandar		2,763	Rex Willing
St Albans	Roger Drayton		1,570	Prudence Rotherberg
St Kilda	Bill Fraser		1,890	Gordon Heslop
South Canterbury	Rob Talbot		4,301	Neville Lambert
Stratford	David Thomson		5,667	P P Hopkins
Sydenham	John Kirk		3,817	Paul Matheson
Tamaki	Robert Muldoon		6,735	Tim Kaye
Tasman	Bill Rowling		529	Peter Malone
Taupo	Jack Ridley	Ray La Varis	1,614	Jack Ridley
Tauranga	Keith Allen		4,843	Richard Hendry
Timaru	Sir Basil Arthur		1,011	Dave Walker
Waikato	Lance Adams-Schneider		7,073	Brian West
Wairarapa	Jack Williams	Ben Couch	1,468	Jack Williams
Waitemata	Michael Bassett	Dail Jones	1,385	Michael Bassett
Wallace	Brian Talboys		6,978	Ian Lamont
Wanganui	Russell Marshall		1,244	John Rowan
Wellington Central	Ken Comber		1,076	David Shand
West Coast	Paddy Blanchfield		2,401	Barry Dallas
Western Hutt	Henry May	Bill Lambert	109	Henry May (Note: Henry May was first on election night, but lost when special votes were included)
Whangarei	Murray Smith	John Elliott	2,710	Murray Smith
Wigram	Mick Connelly		1,967	Neil Russell
Māori electorates
Eastern Maori	Paraone Reweti		6,261	Monty Searancke
Northern Maori	Matiu Rata		4,151	Winston Peters
Southern Maori	Whetu Tirikatene-Sullivan		6,452	Willard Amaru
Western Maori	Koro Wētere		8,925	Emerson Studholme Rangi

Table footnotes:

== Post-election events ==
A number of local by-elections were required due to the resignations of incumbent local body politicians following the general election:

- A by-election occurred for the Invercargill City Council after councillor Norman Jones resigned after being elected to parliament, prompting a by-election. Jones was replaced on the council by J. B. Munro, whom he defeated at the parliamentary election.
- There was a by-election for Mayor of Hamilton. Mayor Mike Minogue resigned after he was elected as MP for Hamilton West. The by-election was win by leader of the Social Credit Party, Bruce Beetham, who had contested Rangitikei in 1975.
