= Minister of Marketing =

New Zealand minister of the Crown

The Minister of Marketing in New Zealand is a former cabinet position (existing from 1936 to 1953) appointed by the Prime Minister to be in charge of matters of promoting New Zealand's commercial growth and trade to both domestic and foreign markets. The minister was responsible for the New Zealand Marketing Department and, from 1950, the minister oversaw a Marketing Advisory Council. In 1960 the Overseas Trade portfolio was created with similar duties.

== List of ministers ==
The following ministers held the office of Minister of Marketing.

Key

Labour National

No.	Name	Portrait	Term of Office		Prime Minister
1	Walter Nash		25 May 1936	11 October 1936	Savage
-	Lee Martin; Acting Minister		11 October 1936	16 August 1937	Savage
(1)	Walter Nash		16 August 1937	21 January 1941	Savage
(1)	Walter Nash		16 August 1937	21 January 1941	Fraser
2	Jim Barclay		21 January 1941	18 October 1943	Fraser
3	Ben Roberts		18 October 1943	19 December 1946	Fraser
4	Ted Cullen		19 December 1946	13 December 1949	Fraser
5	Keith Holyoake		13 December 1949	30 April 1953	Holland
