= Minister of Lands (New Zealand) =

New Zealand minister of the Crown

The Minister of Lands in New Zealand was a cabinet position appointed by the Prime Minister to be in charge of the Department of Lands and Survey.

== List of ministers ==
The following ministers held the office of Minister of Lands.

Key

Independent Liberal Reform United Labour National

| No. | Name | Portrait | Term of Office | | Prime Minister |
|---|---|---|---|---|---|
| 1 | Henry Tancred | | 19 August 1858 | 12 July 1861 | Stafford |
| 2 | William Gisborne | | 2 August 1861 | 6 August 1862 | Fox |
| 3 | Walter Mantell | | 6 August 1862 | 21 August 1862 | Domett |
| 4 | Alfred Domett | | 22 August 1862 | 30 October 1863 | Domett |
| 5 | Thomas Gillies | | 30 October 1863 | 13 January 1864 | Whitaker |
| (4) | Alfred Domett (Note: Domett was appointed to the Lands portfolio, but not in Ministerial capacity) | | 13 January 1864 | 24 November 1864 | Whitaker |
Office not in use
| 6 | William Fitzherbert | | 10 September 1872 | 11 October 1872 | Stafford |
| 7 | Maurice O'Rorke | | 11 October 1872 | 13 August 1874 | Waterhouse |
| 7 | Maurice O'Rorke | | 11 October 1872 | 13 August 1874 | Fox |
| 7 | Maurice O'Rorke | | 11 October 1872 | 13 August 1874 | Vogel |
| 8 | Harry Atkinson | | 7 September 1874 | 1 September 1876 | Vogel |
| 8 | Harry Atkinson | | 7 September 1874 | 1 September 1876 | Pollen |
| 8 | Harry Atkinson | | 7 September 1874 | 1 September 1876 | Vogel |
| 9 | John Davies Ormond | | 1 September 1876 | 13 September 1876 | Atkinson |
| (8) | Harry Atkinson | | 13 September 1876 | 4 January 1877 | Atkinson |
| 10 | Donald Reid | | 4 January 1877 | 13 October 1877 | Atkinson |
| 11 | James Macandrew | | 15 October 1877 | 25 July 1878 | Grey |
| 12 | Robert Stout | | 25 July 1878 | 25 June 1879 | Grey |
| 13 | William Gisborne | | 25 June 1879 | 15 July 1879 | Grey |
| 14 | James William Thomson | | 15 July 1879 | 8 October 1879 | Grey |
| 15 | William Rolleston | | 8 October 1879 | 16 August 1884 | Hall |
| 15 | William Rolleston | | 8 October 1879 | 16 August 1884 | Whitaker |
| 15 | William Rolleston | | 8 October 1879 | 16 August 1884 | Atkinson |
| (11) | James Macandrew | | 16 August 1884 | 28 August 1884 | Stout |
| 16 | Richmond Hursthouse | | 28 August 1884 | 3 September 1884 | Atkinson |
| 17 | John Ballance | | 3 September 1884 | 8 October 1887 | Stout |
| 18 | George Richardson | | 8 October 1887 | 24 January 1891 | Atkinson |
| 19 | John McKenzie | | 24 January 1891 | 27 June 1900 | Ballance |
| 19 | John McKenzie | | 24 January 1891 | 27 June 1900 | Seddon |
| 20 | Tom Duncan | | 2 July 1900 | 6 August 1906 | Seddon |
| 20 | Tom Duncan | | 2 July 1900 | 6 August 1906 | Hall-Jones |
| 21 | Robert McNab | | 6 August 1906 | 30 November 1908 | Ward |
| 22 | Joseph Ward | | 1 December 1908 | 28 March 1912 | Ward |
| 23 | Thomas Mackenzie | | 28 March 1912 | 10 July 1912 | Mackenzie |
| 24 | William Massey | | 10 July 1912 | 27 February 1918 | Massey |
| 25 | David Guthrie | | 27 February 1918 | 25 June 1924 | Massey |
| 26 | Alex McLeod | | 25 June 1924 | 28 November 1928 | Massey |
| 26 | Alex McLeod | | 25 June 1924 | 28 November 1928 | Bell |
| 26 | Alex McLeod | | 25 June 1924 | 28 November 1928 | Coates |
| 27 | Kenneth Williams | | 28 November 1928 | 10 December 1928 | Coates |
| 28 | George Forbes | | 10 December 1928 | 28 May 1930 | Ward |
| 29 | Alfred Ransom | | 28 May 1930 | 6 December 1935 | Forbes |
| 30 | Frank Langstone | | 6 December 1935 | 21 December 1942 | Savage |
| 30 | Frank Langstone | | 6 December 1935 | 21 December 1942 | Fraser |
| 31 | Jim Barclay | | 7 July 1943 | 18 October 1943 | Fraser |
| 32 | Jerry Skinner | | 29 October 1943 | 26 November 1949 | Fraser |
| 33 | Ernest Corbett | | 13 December 1949 | 26 September 1957 | Holland |
| 34 | Geoff Gerard | | 26 September 1957 | 12 December 1957 | Holland |
| 34 | Geoff Gerard | | 26 September 1957 | 12 December 1957 | Holyoake |
| (32) | Jerry Skinner | | 12 December 1957 | 12 December 1960 | Nash |
| (34) | Geoff Gerard | | 12 December 1960 | 12 December 1966 | Holyoake |
| 35 | Duncan MacIntyre | | 12 December 1966 | 8 December 1972 | Holyoake |
| 35 | Duncan MacIntyre | | 12 December 1966 | 8 December 1972 | Marshall |
| 36 | Matiu Rata | | 8 December 1972 | 12 December 1975 | Kirk |
| 36 | Matiu Rata | | 8 December 1972 | 12 December 1975 | Rowling |
| 37 | Venn Young | | 12 December 1975 | 11 December 1981 | Muldoon |
| 38 | Jonathan Elworthy | | 11 December 1981 | 26 July 1984 | Muldoon |
| 39 | Koro Wētere | | 26 July 1984 | 16 September 1987 | Lange |
| 40 | Peter Tapsell | | 16 September 1987 | 2 November 1990 | Lange |
| 40 | Peter Tapsell | | 16 September 1987 | 2 November 1990 | Palmer |
| 40 | Peter Tapsell | | 16 September 1987 | 2 November 1990 | Moore |
| 41 | Rob Storey | | 2 November 1990 | 2 November 1993 | Bolger |
| 42 | Denis Marshall | | 2 November 1993 | 10 December 1996 | Bolger |
| 43 | John Luxton | | 10 December 1996 | 31 August 1998 | Bolger |

Table footnotes:
