= Jim Barclay (politician) =

New Zealand politician

The Honourable Jim Barclay
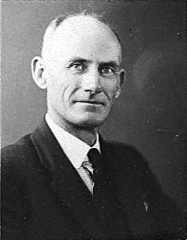

16th Minister of Agriculture
- In office 21 January 1941 – 18 October 1943
- Prime Minister: Peter Fraser
- Preceded by: Lee Martin
- Succeeded by: Ben Roberts

Member of the New Zealand Parliament for Marsden
- In office 27 November 1935 – 25 September 1943
- Preceded by: Alfred Murdoch
- Succeeded by: Alfred Murdoch

Personal details
- Born: 24 June 1882 Banks Peninsula, New Zealand
- Died: 5 October 1972 (aged 90) Christchurch, New Zealand
- Party: Labour
- Relations: Bruce Barclay (son); Ron Barclay (nephew)

James Gillespie Barclay (24 June 1882 – 5 October 1972) was a New Zealand politician of the Labour Party.

== Biography ==
=== Early life ===
Barclay was born in Pigeon Bay on Banks Peninsula. His father was Morrison Barclay. He married Helen Betrice in 1907, but was a widower by the time he joined the army. Before World War I, he was a farmer and lived in the Christchurch suburb of Riccarton. He served with the New Zealand Expeditionary Force from 1916 to 1919. He then bought a property in Pukehuia, Northland, where he owned 1,600 acres (650 ha) near the Wairoa River. He sold his farm in 1931 and retired to Whangārei. He served on several local boards in Northland.

=== Political career ===
New Zealand Parliament
Years	Term	Electorate	Party
1935–1938	25th	Marsden	Labour
1938–1943	26th	Marsden	Labour

Barclay unsuccessfully stood against the Prime Minister, Gordon Coates, in the Kaipara electorate in the 1928 election. In the 1931 election, he unsuccessfully challenged the incumbent in the Marsden electorate in Northland, Alfred Murdoch. He beat Murdoch in the 1935 election, but was defeated in turn by Murdoch after two parliamentary terms in 1943.

He was a cabinet minister in the First Labour Government under Peter Fraser. He was Minister of Agriculture (1941–1943), Minister of Marketing (1941–1943), Minister of Lands (1943), and Commissioner of State Forests (1943).

He then became High Commissioner to Australia from 1944 to 1950. His appointment (and that of the other defeated candidate Charles Boswell) attracted criticism as political appointments.

=== Later life ===
A son, Bruce Barclay, was Member of Parliament for Christchurch Central from 1969 to 1979. A nephew, Ron Barclay, was MP for New Plymouth from 1966 to 1975.

James Barclay died in Christchurch in 1972.

== Notes ==
Political offices
Preceded by Lee Martin	Minister of Agriculture; 1941–1943	Succeeded by Ben Roberts
New Zealand Parliament
Preceded by Alfred Murdoch	Member of Parliament for Marsden; 1935–1943	Succeeded by Alfred Murdoch
Party political offices
Preceded by Jim Thorn	Vice-President of the New Zealand Labour Party; 1938–1940	Succeeded by Gervan McMillan
