= David Butcher =

New Zealand politician (born 1948)

The Honourable David Butcher

52nd Postmaster-General
- In office 5 November 1988 – 14 August 1989
- Prime Minister: David Lange; Geoffrey Palmer
- Preceded by: Richard Prebble
- Succeeded by: Position abolished

1st Minister of Commerce
- In office 24 August 1987 – 2 November 1990
- Prime Minister: David Lange; Geoffrey Palmer; Mike Moore
- Preceded by: Position established
- Succeeded by: Philip Burdon

Member of the New Zealand Parliament for Hastings
- In office 25 November 1978 – 27 October 1990
- Preceded by: Bob Fenton
- Succeeded by: Jeff Whittaker

Personal details
- Born: David John Butcher; 19 September 1948 (age 78) Brighton, England
- Party: Labour
- Spouse: Mary Georgina Hall (m. 1980)
- Education: Victoria University of Wellington

David John Butcher (born 19 September 1948) is a New Zealand former politician of the Labour Party. He was Minister of Commerce from 1987 to 1990 and Postmaster-General from 1988 to 1989.

== Early life and family ==
Butcher was born in Brighton, England, on 19 September 1948, the son of Dorothy May Butcher (née Guppy) and Frank George Butcher. The family migrated to New Zealand in 1963, and he attended Karamu High School in Hastings with broadcaster Paul Holmes, and Victoria University of Wellington. While at Victoria, he was president of the Victoria University Labour Club. He graduated with an economics degree and became a member of the New Zealand Association of Economists. From 1972 to 1974, he worked as an economist in the Labour Department, Wellington. During 1974–75 he travelled overseas in Asia and Europe. From 1976 until 1978, he was a field officer for the Wellington Clerical Workers' Union and the New Zealand Labourers' Union in Hawke's Bay. He was a member of the Hawkes Bay Trade Council and its nominee on the council of the Hawkes Bay Community College.

Butcher became a naturalised New Zealand citizen in 1975, and in 1980, Butcher married Mary Georgina Hall.

== Political career ==
New Zealand Parliament
Years	Term	Electorate	Party
1978–1981	39th	Hastings	Labour
1981–1984	40th	Hastings	Labour
1984–1987	41st	Hastings	Labour
1987–1990	42nd	Hastings	Labour

Butcher stood unsuccessfully for the seat of Hawkes Bay three times, in the 1969 election, 1972 election and 1975 election, before becoming an MP for the seat of Hastings in the 1978 election. Prior to entering parliament he was a member of the New Zealand Council of Labour Party. In 1983 he was appointed as Labour's spokesperson for State Insurance and the Government Life Office by Labour leader David Lange. In 1986 he represented the New Zealand government at an agricultural ministers conference in Hobart.

During the Fourth Labour Government, Butcher served as a Cabinet minister, with posts including Minister of Commerce, Minister of Energy, Minister of Trade and Industry and Postmaster-General. As Minister of Energy, Butcher had responsibility for ensuring that privatised utilities operated in a competitive environment, or were subjected to appropriate regulation. He was also associate Minister of Finance and mostly a supporter of the Rogernomics agenda of finance minister Roger Douglas. As Minister of Energy he sold the government-owned Petrocorp for $801 million to Rossport Investments Ltd on 31 March 1988.

He represented the Hastings electorate in Parliament until 1990, when he was defeated by National's Jeff Whittaker, one of a number of losses contributing to the fall of the Fourth Labour Government. His defeat was not expected with most expecting him to be re-elected with a reduced majority.

In 1990, Butcher was awarded the New Zealand 1990 Commemoration Medal.

== Life after politics ==
Since 1990, Butcher has been the manager of David Butcher and Associates (DBA), and has worked on assignments in several countries. He worked in a business consultancy deal with the Asian Development Bank. In 2000, he was fined $10,000 plus reparations, for fraudulently claiming expenses on airline tickets under a travel rebate scheme for former MPs.

== Notes ==
Political offices
Preceded by David Caygill	Minister of Trade and Industry; 1988–1989	Position abolished
Preceded by Richard Prebble	Postmaster-General; 1988–1989	Position abolished
New title	Minister of Commerce; 1987–1990	Succeeded by Philip Burdon
Preceded by Bob Tizard	Minister of Energy; 1987–1990	Succeeded by John Luxton
New Zealand Parliament
Preceded by Bob Fenton	Member of Parliament for Hastings; 1978–1990	Succeeded by Jeff Whittaker
