= Hastings (New Zealand electorate) =

Hastings was a parliamentary electorate in the Hawke's Bay Region of New Zealand from 1946 to 1996. The electorate was represented by nine Members of Parliament. The Hastings electorate was a typical bellwether electorate, frequently changing between the two main parties.

== Population centres ==
The 1941 New Zealand census had been postponed due to World War II, so the 1946 electoral redistribution had to take ten years of population growth and movements into account. The North Island gained a further two electorates from the South Island due to faster population growth. The abolition of the country quota through the Electoral Amendment Act, 1945 reduced the number and increased the size of rural electorates. None of the existing electorates remained unchanged, 27 electorates were abolished, eight former electorates were re-established, and 19 electorates were created for the first time, including Hastings. The towns of Hastings and Havelock North have always been located within the electorate until the 1987 electoral redistribution, whereas the nearby Fernhill was always included in the adjacent Hawke's Bay electorate.

== History ==
The first representative was Ted Cullen of the Labour Party. At the 1949 election, Cullen was defeated by Sydney Jones of the National Party. After two electoral terms, Jones was in turn defeated by Labour's Ted Keating, who served until his defeat in 1960. Subsequent office holders were Duncan MacIntyre (1960–1972), Richard Mayson (1972–1975), Bob Fenton (1975–1978), David Butcher (1978–1990), Jeff Whittaker (1990–1993), and Rick Barker (1993–1996).

=== Members of Parliament ===
The Hastings electorate was represented by nine Members of Parliament:

Key

Labour National

Election	Winner
1946 election	Ted Cullen
1949 election	Sydney Jones
1951 election	Sydney Jones
1954 election	Ted Keating
1957 election	Ted Keating
1960 election	Duncan MacIntyre
1963 election	Duncan MacIntyre
1966 election	Duncan MacIntyre
1969 election	Duncan MacIntyre
1972 election	Richard Mayson
1975 election	Bob Fenton
1978 election	David Butcher
1981 election	David Butcher
1984 election	David Butcher
1987 election	David Butcher
1990 election	Jeff Whittaker
1993 election	Rick Barker
(Electorate abolished in 1996; see Tukituki)

== Election results ==
=== 1993 election ===
1993 general election: Hastings
Party	Candidate	Votes	%	±%
Labour	Rick Barker	9,000	45.02	
National	Cynthia Bowers	6,429	32.16	
Alliance	Pat Weir	2,689	13.45	
NZ First	John Waitere	932	4.66	
Christian Heritage	Rex Jones	640	3.20	
McGillicuddy Serious	John Morrison	128	0.64	
Independent	Geoffrey Charters	104	0.52	−0.60
Natural Law	Martin Ouseley	66	0.33	
Majority		2,571	12.86	
Turnout		19,988	86.19	+0.01
Registered electors		23,188		

=== 1990 election ===
1990 general election: Hastings
Party	Candidate	Votes	%	±%
National	Jeff Whittaker	9,132	45.96	+3.55
Labour	David Butcher	8,404	42.29	−11.54
Green	Matthew Ball	1,246	6.27	
NewLabour	Greg Maher	688	3.46	
Independent	Geoffrey Charters	223	1.12	
Democrats	Mary Sanders	176	0.88	−2.87
Majority		728	3.66	
Turnout		19,869	86.18	−3.46
Registered electors		23,055		

=== 1987 election ===
1987 general election: Hastings
Party	Candidate	Votes	%	±%
Labour	David Butcher	10,879	53.83	+2.62
National	Jeff Whittaker	8,572	42.41	
Democrats	Mary Sanders	758	3.75	
Majority		2,307	11.41	−8.16
Turnout		20,209	89.64	−3.54
Registered electors		22,544		

=== 1984 election ===
1984 general election: Hastings
Party	Candidate	Votes	%	±%
Labour	David Butcher	11,179	51.21	+5.97
National	Peter Brown	6,906	31.64	
NZ Party	Sara Slavin	2,803	12.84	
Social Credit	John Rabarts	938	4.29	
Majority		4,273	19.57	+10.74
Turnout		21,826	93.18	+1.78
Registered electors		23,423		

=== 1981 election ===
1981 general election: Hastings
Party	Candidate	Votes	%	±%
Labour	David Butcher	9,453	45.24	+7.82
National	Hamish Kynoch	7,608	36.41	
Social Credit	Gary Clover	3,764	18.01	
Independent	A J L D Wedekind	68	0.32	
Majority		1,845	8.83	+7.22
Turnout		20,893	91.40	+19.95
Registered electors		22,857		

=== 1978 election ===
1978 general election: Hastings
Party	Candidate	Votes	%	±%
Labour	David Butcher	7,748	37.42	
National	Bob Fenton	7,414	35.81	−9.48
Social Credit	Jeremy Dwyer	5,373	25.95	+17.03
Values	C L Amery	148	0.71	
Independent	R MacGregor	20	0.09	
Majority		334	1.61	
Turnout		20,703	71.45	−14.07
Registered electors		28,972		

=== 1975 election ===
1975 general election: Hastings
Party	Candidate	Votes	%	±%
National	Bob Fenton	9,071	45.29	
Labour	Richard Mayson	8,580	42.84	−7.52
Social Credit	Jeremy Dwyer	1,788	8.92	
Values	Graeme Cook	587	2.93	
Majority		491	2.45	
Turnout		20,026	85.52	−5.36
Registered electors		23,415		

=== 1972 election ===
1972 general election: Hastings
Party	Candidate	Votes	%	±%
Labour	Richard Mayson	9,117	50.36	+5.74
National	Duncan MacIntyre	7,969	44.02	−4.66
Social Credit	George Neville Whitcombe	663	3.66	−3.03
Values	Robin Duff	304	1.67	
New Democratic	Gwendoline Alice Dick	50	0.27	
Majority		1,148	6.34	
Turnout		18,103	90.88	+0.97
Registered electors		19,918		

=== 1969 election ===
1969 general election: Hastings
Party	Candidate	Votes	%	±%
National	Duncan MacIntyre	8,458	48.68	−2.61
Labour	Richard Mayson	7,752	44.62	
Social Credit	George Neville Whitcombe	1,163	6.69	−3.38
Majority		706	4.06	−8.59
Turnout		17,373	89.91	+1.27
Registered electors		19,321		

=== 1966 election ===
1966 general election: Hastings
Party	Candidate	Votes	%	±%
National	Duncan MacIntyre	8,626	51.29	−1.64
Labour	Sonja Davies	6,497	38.63	
Social Credit	George Neville Whitcombe	1,695	10.07	
Majority		2,129	12.65	+0.85
Turnout		16,818	88.64	−3.87
Registered electors		18,973		

=== 1963 election ===
1963 general election: Hastings
Party	Candidate	Votes	%	±%
National	Duncan MacIntyre	8,719	52.93	+5.14
Labour	Ted Keating	6,775	41.14	−4.86
Social Credit	George Thew	978	5.93	−1.88
Majority		1,944	11.80	+10.00
Turnout		16,472	92.51	+1.86
Registered electors		17,804		

=== 1960 election ===
1960 general election: Hastings
Party	Candidate	Votes	%	±%
National	Duncan MacIntyre	7,965	47.79	
Labour	Ted Keating	7,665	46.00	−5.11
Social Credit	George Thew	1,302	7.81	+2.93
Majority		300	1.80	
Turnout		16,662	90.65	−3.04
Registered electors		18,379		

=== 1957 election ===
1957 general election: Hastings
Party	Candidate	Votes	%	±%
Labour	Ted Keating	8,146	50.89	+4.28
National	Arthur Henry Sivewright	7,076	44.21	
Social Credit	George Thew	782	4.88	−3.53
Majority		1,070	6.68	+5.03
Turnout		16,004	93.69	−0.15
Registered electors		17,081		

=== 1954 election ===
1954 general election: Hastings
Party	Candidate	Votes	%	±%
Labour	Ted Keating	7,087	46.61	
National	Sydney Jones	6,835	44.96	−8.76
Social Credit	George Thew	1,280	8.41	
Majority		252	1.65	
Turnout		15,202	93.84	+4.56
Registered electors		16,199		

=== 1951 election ===
1951 general election: Hastings
Party	Candidate	Votes	%	±%
National	Sydney Jones	8,198	53.72	+0.44
Labour	Henry Edward Beattie	7,060	46.27	
Majority		1,138	7.45	+0.89
Turnout		15,258	89.28	−3.58
Registered electors		17,090		

=== 1949 election ===
1949 general election: Hastings
Party	Candidate	Votes	%	±%
National	Sydney Jones	7,965	53.28	
Labour	Ted Cullen	6,983	46.72	−5.00
Majority		982	6.56	
Turnout		14,948	92.86	−1.75
Registered electors		16,097		

=== 1946 election ===
1946 general election: Hastings
Party	Candidate	Votes	%	±%
Labour	Ted Cullen	7,292	51.72	
National	Eric Pryor	6,809	48.28	
Majority		483	3.42	
Turnout		14,101	94.61	
Registered electors		14,904		
