= Richard Mayson =

New Zealand politician

Charles Richard Mayson (born 13 October 1941), generally known as Richard Mayson, is a former New Zealand politician of the Labour Party.

== Biography ==
New Zealand Parliament
Years	Term	Electorate	Party
1972–1975	37th	Hastings	Labour

Mayson was born in Nelson in 1941, the son of Charles Samuel Mayson. He received his education at Nelson Central School, Nelson College, and Hastings Boys' High School. On 8 February 1964, he married Shirley Annette Schofield, the daughter of Edward Schofield. They had one son and one daughter.

After school, Mayson worked as a farm hand (1957–1959), a labourer (1959–1960), a salesman and window display artist (1960–1964), and a radio salesman (1965–1970). He was a New Zealand Broadcasting Corporation (NZBC) advertising executive in 1970 and 1971, and a lay preacher in the Methodist Church.

He joined the Labour Party in his youth and was a member and delegate from the party's Grey Lynn branch and later was secretary of the Porirua branch. He was a radical Christian socialist.

Mayson represented the Hastings electorate from 1972 to 1975, when he was defeated by National's Bob Fenton. He had previously stood unsuccessfully for Hastings in the 1969 election. During the 1975 election campaign Mayson received a threatening letter containing a live .22 caliber round, the third time he had received such a letter. The third letter stated "We've had enough of your kind of Commie lot [Labour] ... you're selling out on democracy and you will be the first to get a .308 through your stomach." Mayson made a complaint to the police.

After losing his seat in Parliament he travelled to Tanzania to visit former parliamentary colleague Phil Amos who was living there. Mayson commented that Amos was living the life of a 20th-century version of David Livingstone.

Mayson was awarded the New Zealand 1990 Commemoration Medal. For his recreation, he enjoys tennis, squash, swimming, reading, and spending time with his family.

== Notes ==
New Zealand Parliament
Preceded by Duncan MacIntyre	Member of Parliament for Hastings; 1972–1975	Succeeded by Bob Fenton
