= Duncan MacIntyre (New Zealand politician) =

New Zealand politician (1915–2001)

Brigadier The Right Honourable Duncan MacIntyre CMG DSO OBE ED
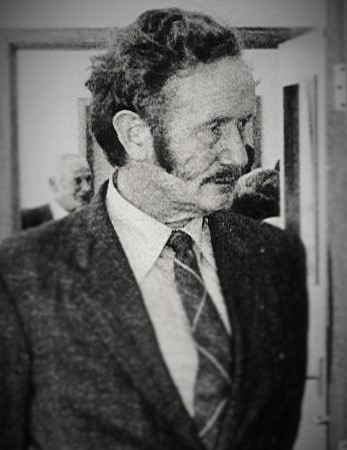

8th Deputy Prime Minister of New Zealand
- In office 4 March 1981 – 15 March 1984
- Prime Minister: Robert Muldoon
- Preceded by: Brian Talboys
- Succeeded by: Jim McLay

27th Minister of Agriculture
- In office 12 December 1975 – 26 July 1984
- Prime Minister: Robert Muldoon
- Preceded by: Colin Moyle
- Succeeded by: Colin Moyle

32nd Minister for Māori Affairs
- In office 12 December 1975 – 13 December 1978
- Prime Minister: Robert Muldoon
- Preceded by: Matiu Rata
- Succeeded by: Ben Couch
- In office 22 December 1969 – 8 December 1972
- Prime Minister: Keith Holyoake; Jack Marshall
- Preceded by: Ralph Hanan
- Succeeded by: Matiu Rata

35th Minister of Lands
- In office 12 December 1966 – 8 December 1972
- Prime Minister: Keith Holyoake; Jack Marshall
- Preceded by: Geoff Gerard
- Succeeded by: Matiu Rata

Member of the New Zealand Parliament for East Cape Bay of Plenty (1975–1978)
- In office 29 November 1975 – 14 July 1984
- Preceded by: Percy Allen
- Succeeded by: Anne Fraser

Member of the New Zealand Parliament for Hastings
- In office 26 November 1960 – 25 November 1972
- Preceded by: Ted Keating
- Succeeded by: Richard Mayson

Personal details
- Born: 10 November 1915 Hastings, New Zealand
- Died: 8 June 2001 (aged 85) Waipukurau, New Zealand
- Party: National
- Spouses: Diana Grace Hunter (m. 1939; died 1996) Jacqueline Gilbertson (m. 1998; died 2021)
- Relations: Hamish MacIntyre (son)
- Children: 5

Military service
- Allegiance: New Zealand Army
- Years of service: 1939–1946
- Rank: Brigadier
- Unit: Divisional Cavalry Regiment
- Battles/wars: World War II

Brigadier Duncan MacIntyre CMG DSO OBE ED PC (10 November 1915 – 8 June 2001) was a New Zealand politician of the National Party. He served as the eighth deputy prime minister of New Zealand from 1981 to 1984 under Prime Minister Robert Muldoon.

== Biography ==
=== Early life and career ===
MacIntyre was born at Hastings on 10 November 1915. He was the eldest of six children between Esther Mary Bell and the Scottish-born Archibald MacIntyre, a farmer near Bridge Pa. He attended school in Hastings before being sent by his father to Scotland where he attended Larchfield School. He returned to New Zealand where he received his secondary school education at Christ's College, Christchurch.

He started work in 1933 as a farm cadet and from 1936 managed a farm at Punakitere, Northland until 1939. MacIntyre married Diana Grace Hunter, the daughter of a Hawke's Bay farming family on 10 January 1939 in Havelock North. The two were to have three daughters and two sons. In 1939, at the outbreak of the World War II, he left farming and joined the New Zealand Army.

=== Military career ===
MacIntyre enlisted in the 15th (North Auckland) Regiment. He was to serve with the Divisional Cavalry Regiment (or "Div Cav") in North Africa and Italy. He had risen to the rank of major by December 1944 and was appointed commander of C Squadron of the div cav (D Squadron was later led by Jack Marshall, a future parliamentary colleague and prime minister). He led the div cav offensive in April 1945 which helped to spearhead the final New Zealand Division offensive in Italy. The attack swept northwards against German resistance which had mostly collapsed. For his leadership in the offensive he was made a Companion of the Distinguished Service Order. In particular he was noted for leading a 'vigorous counter-attack' on the night of 17/18 April across the Gaiana River before climbing onto a knocked-out Sherman tank and used its machine gun to pin down enemy positions the following day. He was later promoted to lieutenant colonel and on 7 August 1945 MacIntyre took command of the whole div cav, still stationed in Italy.

Upon the formation of J Force (New Zealand's portion of the British Commonwealth Occupation Force in Japan) he volunteered to lead the Cavalry component, which was also to include 270 troops from the 28th Māori Battalion. He arrived in Japan in March 1946, but by late April was in hospital with appendicitis. He briefly returned to duty but was to relinquish command on 28 June.

MacIntyre returned to New Zealand and resumed farming and joined the local branch of Federated Farmers. He purchased a sheep farm near Pōrangahau in southern Hawke's Bay in the early 1950s and was elected to the Hawke's Bay Catchment Board. His military career continued on part-time with the Territorial Force, commanding various components including the Hawke's Bay Regiment, Armoured Car Regiment, Infantry Brigade and Armoured Brigade as well as gaining the rank of brigadier.

In 1953, MacIntyre was awarded the Queen Elizabeth II Coronation Medal. In the 1956 New Year Honours, he was appointed an Officer of the Order of the British Empire (Military Division).

=== Political career ===
New Zealand Parliament
Years	Term	Electorate	Party
1960–1963	33rd	Hastings	National
1963–1966	34th	Hastings	National
1966–1969	35th	Hastings	National
1969–1972	36th	Hastings	National
1975–1978	38th	Bay of Plenty	National
1978–1981	39th	East Cape	National
1981–1984	40th	East Cape	National

MacIntyre represented the Hastings electorate in Parliament from 1960 to 1972. With Robert Muldoon and Peter Gordon he was one of the three "Young Turks" of the National Party who entered Parliament in 1960. The trio would regularly discuss the issues of the day over late-night drinks and their wives also were to become friends. They became noted for their willingness to challenge senior National ministers as well as members of the Labour opposition on issues. In 1961 he was one of ten National MPs to vote with the Opposition and remove capital punishment for murder from the Crimes Bill that the Second National Government had introduced.

He served under three Prime Ministers (Keith Holyoake, Jack Marshall, and later Robert Muldoon) as Cabinet Minister. He was Minister of Lands and Minister of Forests from 1966 to 1972, Minister of Māori Affairs, Minister of Island Territories from 1969 to 1972 and Minister of Island Affairs and Minister for the Environment in 1972. He gained a reputation as capable and hardworking and was a strong advocate for diversifying forest planting as well as its applications on private land, seeing its potential to boost the incomes of farmers as well as providing employment and supporting the processing industry. In 1971 and 1972 MacIntyre was Administrator of Tokelau.

He promoted the Māori Affairs Amendment Act 1967, which threatened to increase the alienation of Māori land, but MacIntyre foresaw that there would be economic opportunities for Māori in both the forestry and fisheries industries. He would emphasise 'self-help' to Māori and urged iwi and hapū to develop their lands productively to avoid the risk of losing them.

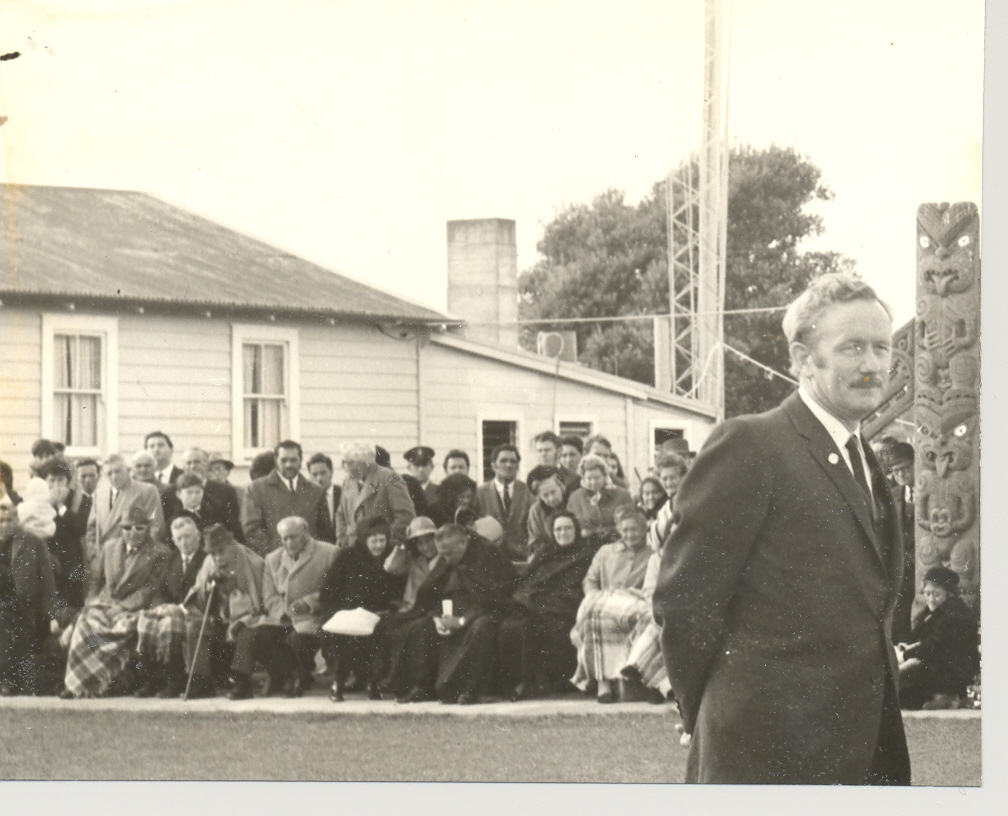
MacIntyre at Raukawa Marae in Ōtaki, 1971

As Minister for the Environment he became unpopular during the Save Manapouri campaign and, just weeks out from an election, gazetted trout farming legislation which displeased anglers and conservationists. At a public meeting in Hastings during the election campaign the prime minister, Jack Marshall, told those in attendance "If anglers want the trout farm legislation repealed, then I suggest they vote for Mr. Kirk [Labour Party leader Norman Kirk]." They did and not only was National beaten heavily but MacIntyre was defeated in Hastings at the 1972 election. Out of parliament he returned to farming, before being appointed by the Meat Producers' Board as chairman of their export committee.

After three years He returned to parliament to represent the Bay of Plenty electorate in Parliament from 1975 to 1978, and the East Cape electorate from 1978 to 1984.

Under Muldoon he was appointed again to the cabinet. He was Minister of Māori Affairs (1975–1978), Minister of Agriculture and Fisheries (1975–1977), Minister of Agriculture (1977–1984), and Minister of Fisheries (1978–1984). He was made a Privy Councillor in 1980.

In September 1980 MacIntyre gave a Marginal Land Boards loan to his daughter and son-in-law raising questions around Conflict of interest. In 1979 his daughter Audrey and her husband, Jim Fitzgerald, had purchased land near Karori, Wellington. After applying twice unsuccessfully, they were granted a loan of $137,000 from the Marginal Lands Board to develop the property. A public inquiry later concluded that MacIntyre had not acted willfully improperly. Nonetheless, several public resignations of National Party officeholders followed in MacIntyre's East Cape electorate causing serious damage to MacIntyre's reputation. He later conceded that the 'Marginal Lands affair' was "a ghost that haunts me for the rest of my life."

By 1982, MacIntyre had a serious heart problem and he decided to retire at the 1984.

== Later life ==
His son, Hamish MacIntyre, was elected to Parliament in 1990. Hamish resigned from National in 1991 in protest of the neo-liberal economic reforms being undertaken, subsequently jointly forming a new Liberal Party, which soon afterwards became part of the Alliance, but was defeated at the next election in 1993.

In the 1992 Queen's Birthday Honours, MacIntyre was appointed a Companion of the Order of St Michael and St George, for public services.

He died at Waipukurau on 8 June 2001. Ngāti Kahungunu held him in such high regard for his conduct as Māori Affairs Minister that his body was at their Porangahau Marae for one night before the funeral. He was survived by his second wife Jaqueline MacIntyre (Gilbertson), daughters and a son.

== Notes ==
Political offices
Preceded by Geoff Gerard	Minister of Forests; 1966–1972	Succeeded by Colin Moyle
Preceded by Geoff Gerard	Minister of Lands; 1966–1972	Succeeded by Matiu Rata
Preceded by Ralph Hanan	Minister of Māori Affairs; 1969–1972 1975–1978	Succeeded by Matiu Rata
Preceded by Matiu Rata	Minister of Māori Affairs; 1969–1972 1975–1978	Succeeded by Ben Couch
Preceded by Colin Moyle	Minister of Agriculture; 1975–1984	Succeeded by Colin Moyle
Preceded by Brian Talboys	Deputy Prime Minister of New Zealand; 1981–1984	Succeeded by Jim McLay
New Zealand Parliament
Preceded by Ted Keating	Member of Parliament for Hastings; 1960–1972	Succeeded by Richard Mayson
Preceded by Percy Allen	Member of Parliament for Bay of Plenty; 1975–1978	Vacant Constituency abolished, recreated in 1996 Title next held by Tony Ryall
New constituency	Member of Parliament for East Cape; 1978–1984	Succeeded by Anne Fraser
