= 1998 in New Zealand =

- Decades: 1970s; 1980s; 1990s; 2000s; 2010s
- See also: History of New Zealand; List of years in New Zealand; Timeline of New Zealand history

The following lists events that happened during 1998 in New Zealand.

== Population ==
- Estimated population as of 31 December: 3,829,200.
- Increase since 31 December 1997: 26,500 (0.70%).
- Males per 100 Females: 96.8.

== Incumbents ==
=== Regal and viceregal ===
- Head of State - Elizabeth II
- Governor-General - The Rt Hon. Sir Michael Hardie Boys GNZM, GCMG, QSO

=== Government ===
The 45th New Zealand Parliament continued, with the Fourth National Government in power.

- Speaker of the House - Doug Kidd
- Prime Minister - Jenny Shipley
- Deputy Prime Minister - Winston Peters then Wyatt Creech
- Minister of Finance - Bill Birch
- Minister of Foreign Affairs - Don McKinnon
- Chief Justice — Sir Thomas Eichelbaum

=== Opposition leaders ===
See: Category:Parliament of New Zealand, New Zealand elections

- National - Prime Minister Jenny Shipley
- Act - Richard Prebble
- New Zealand First - Winston Peters
- United New Zealand - Peter Dunne
- Labour - Helen Clark (Leader of the Opposition)
- The Alliance - Jim Anderton and Sandra Lee

=== Main centre leaders ===
- Mayor of Auckland – Les Mills then Christine Fletcher
- Mayor of Hamilton – Margaret Evans then Russ Rimmington
- Mayor of Wellington – Mark Blumsky
- Mayor of Christchurch – Vicki Buck then Garry Moore
- Mayor of Dunedin – Sukhi Turner

== Events ==
- 2 May – By-election in Taranaki-King Country after the former Prime Minister Jim Bolger resigned. Shane Ardern retained the seat for National.
- 14 August – Prime Minister Jenny Shipley sacks Winston Peters from Cabinet after a dispute over the privatisation of Wellington International Airport. Peters subsequently cancels New Zealand First's coalition agreement with National.
- 22 October – Magnum Photo Supplies Ltd v Viko New Zealand Ltd, [1999] (1 NZLR 395) case is decided.
- 27-30 October – Heavy rainfall and flooding in western New Zealand costs over $2 million in insurance payouts.
- New Zealand appoints a resident ambassador to Argentina and establishes an embassy in Buenos Aires.
- Until 2016, this year was New Zealand's warmest year on record.

== Arts and literature ==
- Michael King wins the Robert Burns Fellowship.
- Montana New Zealand Book Awards:
  - Montana Medal: Harry Orsman (ed.), Dictionary of New Zealand English
  - Deutz Medal: Maurice Gee, Live Bodies
  - Reader's Choice: Malcolm McKinnon(ed.), New Zealand Historical Atlas
  - First Book Awards
    - Fiction: Catherine Chidgey, In a fishbone church
    - Poetry: Kapka Kassabova, All Roads Lead to the Sea
    - Non-Fiction: Genevieve Noser, Olives: The new passion

See 1998 in art, 1998 in literature, Category:1998 books

=== Music ===
==== New Zealand Music Awards ====
Winners are shown first with nominees underneath. were:

- Album of the Year: Bic Runga - Drive
  - Salmonella Dub - Calming of the Drunken Monkey
  - Rob Guest - Standing Ovation
  - The Stereobus - Stereobus
  - Greg Johnson - Chinese Whispers
- Single of the Year: Bic Runga - Sway
  - Shihad - Home Again
  - The Feelers - Pressure Man
  - Darcy Clay - Jesus I Was Evil
  - Moizna - Just Another Day
- Best Male Vocalist: Jon Toogood – (Shihad)
  - Greg Johnson (Greg Johnson Set)
  - Booga Beazley (Head Like A Hole)
- Best Female Vocalist: Bic Runga
  - Sulata
  - Annie Crummer
- Best Group: Shihad
  - The Mutton Birds
  - Dam Native
- Most Promising Male Vocalist: Darcy Clay
  - Dave Yetton (The Stereobus)
  - James Reid (The Feelers)
- Most Promising Female Vocalist: Alesha Siosiua (Miozna)
  - Maisey Rika (St Josephs Maori Girls College)
  - Jordan Reyne
- Most Promising Group: Moizna
  - The Feelers
  - The Stereobus
- International Achievement: OMC
  - The Mutton Birds
  - Garageland
- Best Video: Mark Hurley - Home Again (Shihad)
  - Joe Lonie - Pressure Man (The Feelers)
  - Wayne Conway - Suddenly Strange (Bic Runga)
- Best Producer: Malcolm Welsford - Pressure Man (The Feelers)
  - Chris Sinclair - Kia Koe (Sulata)
  - Debbie Harwood & Stephen Small - So This Is Love
- Best Engineer: Simon Sheridan - Sway (Bic Runga)
  - Chris Sinclair - Kia Koe (Sulata)
  - Malcolm Welsford - Pressure Man (The Feelers)
- Best Jazz Album: the New Loungehead - Came a Weird Way
  - Trip to the Moon - Jazz Hop
  - Sustenance - Food For Thought
- Best Classical Album: Daniel Poynton - You Hit Him, He Cry Out
  - Alexander Ivashkin - Shostakovich Cello Concertos
  - Keith Lewis And NZ Chamber Orchestra - Opera Kings Gods And Mortals
- Best Country Album: Kylie Harris - Fancy
- Best Folk Album: Paul Ubana Jones - Blessings and Burdens
  - T&D Bigger Band - Hillingdon
  - AJ Bell - Ragwort Touch
- Best Gospel Album: Parachute Band - You Alone
  - Dennis Marsh - Faith
  - Invasion Band - You Call My Name
- Best Mana Maori Album: Te Matapihi – Te Matapihi
  - Maori Volcanics - Kia Ora
  - Dam Native - Kaupapa Driven Rhymes Uplifted
- Best Mana Reo Album: St Josephs Maori Girls College - E Hine
  - The Willie Matthews Quartet - A Treasury of Maori Songs
  - Nga Kura O Hananah - Nga Kura O Hananah
- Best Children's Album: Kids TV - Sing Something Simple
  - Tessa Grigg & Brian Ringrose - Where Are You Going Colin
  - Jules Riding - Kids Time With Jules Riding
- Best Songwriter: Bic Runga - Sway
  - Greg Johnson - Liberty
  - Jordan Luck - Change Your Mind
- Best Cover: Wayne Conway - Drive (Bic Runga)
  - Crispin Schuberth - Came A Weird Way (The New Loungehead)
  - A Penman & Ross (Finnart) - Calming of the Drunken Monkey (Salmonella Dub)
- New Zealand Radio Programmer Award: John Diver - Channel Z (Wellington)
  - Melanie Wise - Q92FM (Queenstown)
  - Kaye Glamuzina - National Radio

See: 1998 in music

=== Performing arts ===
- Benny Award presented by the Variety Artists Club of New Zealand to Dame Malvina Major ONZ GNZM DBE.

=== Radio and television ===
- 16 March: British children's television series Teletubbies premieres on TV3.
- 30 August: Prime Television New Zealand begins transmission.

See: 1998 in New Zealand television, 1998 in television, List of TVNZ television programming, Category:Television in New Zealand, TV3 (New Zealand), Category:New Zealand television shows, Public broadcasting in New Zealand

=== Film ===
- Memory and Desire
- Saving Grace

See: Category:1998 film awards, 1998 in film, List of New Zealand feature films, Cinema of New Zealand, Category:1998 films

=== Internet ===
See: NZ Internet History

== Sport ==
- See: 1998 in sports, Category:1998 in sports

=== Athletics ===
- Mark Hutchinson wins his second national title in the men's marathon, clocking 2:24:51 on 25 October in Auckland while Bernardine Portenski claims her second in the women's championship (2:44:52)

=== Basketball ===
- the NBL was won by the Nelson Giants

=== Commonwealth Games ===
Gold	Silver	Bronze	Total
8	6	20	34

=== Cricket ===
Various Tours, New Zealand cricket team

- The Shell Trophy for 1998-99 was won by Canterbury, with Northern Districts runners-up.

=== Golf ===
New Zealand Open Category:New Zealand golfers

=== Horse racing ===
==== Harness racing ====
- New Zealand Trotting Cup: Christian Cullen
- Auckland Trotting Cup: Christian Cullen

=== Netball ===
- Silver Ferns
- National Bank Cup
- Netball World Championships

=== Olympic Games ===
- New Zealand sends a team of eight competitors in six sports.

Gold	Silver	Bronze	Total
0	0	0	0

=== Paralympic Games ===
- New Zealand sends a team of five competitors in one sport.

Gold	Silver	Bronze	Total
4	1	1	6

=== Rugby league ===
- The Auckland Warriors finished 15th out of 20 teams in the first season of the National Rugby League premiership.
- Auckland won the National Provincial Competition by defeating Canterbury 44-8 while Waikato ended the season holding the Rugby League Cup.
- 24 April, New Zealand defeated Australia 22-16
- 9 October, New Zealand lost to Australia 12-30
- 31 October, New Zealand defeated Great Britain 22-16
- 7 November, New Zealand defeated Great Britain 36-16
- 14 November, New Zealand drew with Great Britain 23-all

=== Rugby union ===
Category:Rugby union in New Zealand,

- Super 12 - was won by the Canterbury Crusaders who defeated the Auckland Blues 20–13 in the final. Season summary
- National Provincial Championship - won by Otago
- Bledisloe Cup - won 3-0 by Australia
- Tri Nations Series - won by South Africa. New Zealand came last with no wins and only 2 bonus points
- Ranfurly Shield - Waikato held the shield all season, beating Poverty Bay 121–0, King Country 76–0, Bay of Plenty 25–18, Auckland 24–23, Southland 95–7, Nth Harbour 39–22, Northland 63–22, and Canterbury 29-23

=== Shooting ===
- Ballinger Belt – Mike Collings (Te Puke)

=== Soccer ===
- The second National Summer Soccer League was won by Napier City Rovers
- The New Zealand national soccer team won the OFC Nations Cup tournament held in Australia, beating the host nation 2–0 in the final.
- The Chatham Cup is won by Central United who beat Dunedin Technical 5–0 in the final.
- New Zealand U-16 team coached by Wynton Rufer travels to unofficial U-16 World Cup in France to coincide with 1998 FIFA World Cup. Achieve mixed results (0-3 v Italy, 0-2 v Cameroon, 1-1 v Austria, 0-1 v USA, 0-1 v Israel, 1-0 v Norway)

== Births ==
=== January–March ===
- 6 January – Eleanor Epke, squash player
- 11 January – Thomas Mikaele, rugby league player
- 25 January – Sione Havili, rugby union player
- 4 February – Tevita Mafileo, rugby union player
- 5 February – Tai Wynyard, basketballer
- 6 February – Hayden Phillips, field hockey player
- 11 February – Ben Sears, cricketer
- 20 February
  - Emma Cumming, racing cyclist
  - Nicole Fujita, model and tarento
- 24 February – Will Jordan, rugby union player
- 3 March – Sione Asi, rugby union player
- 4 March – Tom Christie, rugby union player
- 28 March – James Fouché, racing cyclist

=== April–June ===
- 2 April – Sam Fischli, rugby union player
- 5 April – Michaela Drummond, racing cyclist
- 9 April – James McGarry, association footballer
- 13 April – Paige Satchell, association footballer
- 17 April – Vilimoni Koroi, rugby union player
- 18 April – Liana Dance, water polo player
- 21 April – Jackson Wells, freestyle skier
- 29 April – Fraser Sheat, cricketer
- 30 April – Liam Wood, association footballer
- 4 May – Waimana Riedlinger-Kapa, rugby union player
- 7 May – Jess Watkin, cricketer
- 12 May – Campbell Stewart, racing cyclist
- 18 May – Brianna Fruean, environmental activist
- 28 May – Logan Rogerson, association footballer
- 16 June – Tanielu Tele’a, rugby union player
- 19 June
  - Ali Galyer, swimmer
  - Harry Plummer, rugby union player

=== July–September ===
- 4 July – Olivia Ray, racing cyclist
- 6 July – Ma'ava Ave, cricketer
- 9 July – Mikayla Harvey, racing cyclist
- 12 July – Hoskins Sotutu, rugby union player
- 15 July – Nathan Smith, cricketer
- 18 July – Ella Harris, racing cyclist
- 1 August – Rosie Cheng, tennis player
- 2 August – Ricky Jackson, rugby union player
- 7 August – Jesse Arthars, rugby league player
- 22 August
  - Leica Guv, Thoroughbred racehorse
  - Adam Pompey, rugby league player
- 28 August
  - Morgan Harper, rugby league player
  - Sarah Morton, association footballer
- 30 August – Ngane Punivai, rugby union player
- 3 September – Bailyn Sullivan, rugby union player
- 13 September – Evelina Afoa, swimmer
- 20 September – Isaiah Papali'i, rugby league player
- 23 September – Bradley Slater, rugby union player

=== October–December ===
- 20 October – Tasmyn Benny, boxer
- 29 October
  - Laghlan McWhannell, rugby union player
  - Felix Murray, cricketer
- 7 November – Rosemary Mair, cricketer
- 17 November – Courtney McGregor, artistic gymnast
- 19 November – Thomas Sexton, racing cyclist
- 29 November – Xavier Numia, rugby union player
- 4 December – Just An Excuse, Standardbred racehorse
- 11 December – Rakai Tait, snowboarder
- 12 December – Elizabeth Anton, association footballer
- 18 December – Jade Lewis, tennis player
- 22 December – Ben Beecroft, cricketer
- 24 December – Nikita Howarth, swimmer

=== Undated ===
- Rupena Parkinson, rugby union player
- Henry Williams, actor
- Indy Yelich, poet and singer-songwriter

== Deaths ==
=== January–March ===
- 12 January – Neil Williams, water polo player (born 1918)
- 14 January – Leonard Atkinson, public servant (born 1906)
- 27 January – Gavin Downie, politician (born 1924)
- 14 February – Peter Jacobson, poet (born 1925)
- 20 February – Ces Blazey, rugby union and athletics administrator (born 1909)
- 8 March – Kuini Te Tau, Ngāi Tahu kaumātua, welfare worker, community leader (born 1899)
- 10 March – C. E. Beeby, educationalist (born 1902)
- 15 March – Darcy Clay, singer–songwriter (born 1972)
- 18 March – Vernon Clare, musician, cabaret owner, restaurateur, music teacher (born 1925)

=== April–June ===
- 6 April – Sam Chaffey, alpine skier (born 1934)
- 26 April – Sir Alan Boxer, air force officer (born 1916)
- 30 April – William Newland, potter (born 1919)
- 1 May – Brian Kendall, boxer (born 1947)
- 14 May –
  - Ron Withell, boxer (born 1916)
  - Jade Wilson, squash player (born 1977)
- 15 May – Jack Warcup, mycologist (born 1921)
- 20 May – John Trenwith, novelist, marketing academic (born 1951)
- 2 June – Brian Johnston, field hockey player (born 1933)
- 13 June – Henry Tatana, rugby league player (born 1945)
- 21 June – Peter Mander, sailor (born 1928)
- 22 June – Brian Davis, Anglican archbishop (born 1934)

=== July–September ===
- 3 July – Elizabeth Riddell, poet and journalist (born 1910)
- 5 July – Frank Creagh, boxer (born 1924)
- 7 July – Maurice Holmes, harness racing driver (born 1908)
- 17 July
  - Marc Hunter, musician (born 1953)
  - Ronald Tremain, composer, music academic (born 1923)
- 26 July – Dixie Cockerton, netball player and coach, cricketer, school principal (born 1925)
- 29 July – Alex Griffiths, conservationist (born 1911)
- 31 July – Athol Meyer, politician (born 1940)
- 3 August – Ronnie Boon, rugby union player (born 1909)
- 7 August – Bill Laney, politician (born 1913)
- 27 August – Essie Summers, novelist (born 1912)
- 30 August – Sir Toss Woollaston, painter and writer (born 1910)
- 12 September – Neville Thornton, rugby union player (born 1918)
- 13 September – Sir Frank Renouf, stockbroker, businessman, philanthropist (born 1918)
- 15 September – Amy Harper, photographer (born 1900)
- 18 September – Andy Wiren, cricketer (born 1911)
- 23 September – Trevor Berghan, rugby union player (born 1914)

=== October–December ===
- 1 October – Jim Kearney, rugby union player (born 1920)
- 4 October – Tony Shelly, motor racing driver (born 1937)
- 18 October – Ilse von Randow, weaver (born 1901)
- 26 November – Sir Charles Bennett, broadcaster, military leader, public servant, diplomat, politician (born 1913)
- 6 December – Ken Comber, politician (born 1939)
- 8 December – Aaron Hopa, rugby union player (born 1971)
- 12 December – Phillippe Cabot, rugby union player (born 1900)

== See also ==
- List of years in New Zealand
- Timeline of New Zealand history
- History of New Zealand
- Military history of New Zealand
- Timeline of the New Zealand environment
- Timeline of New Zealand's links with Antarctica

For world events and topics in 1998 not specifically related to New Zealand see: 1998
