= Škoda Type 742 =

Rear-engined, small family car by AZNP

Škoda 742/746
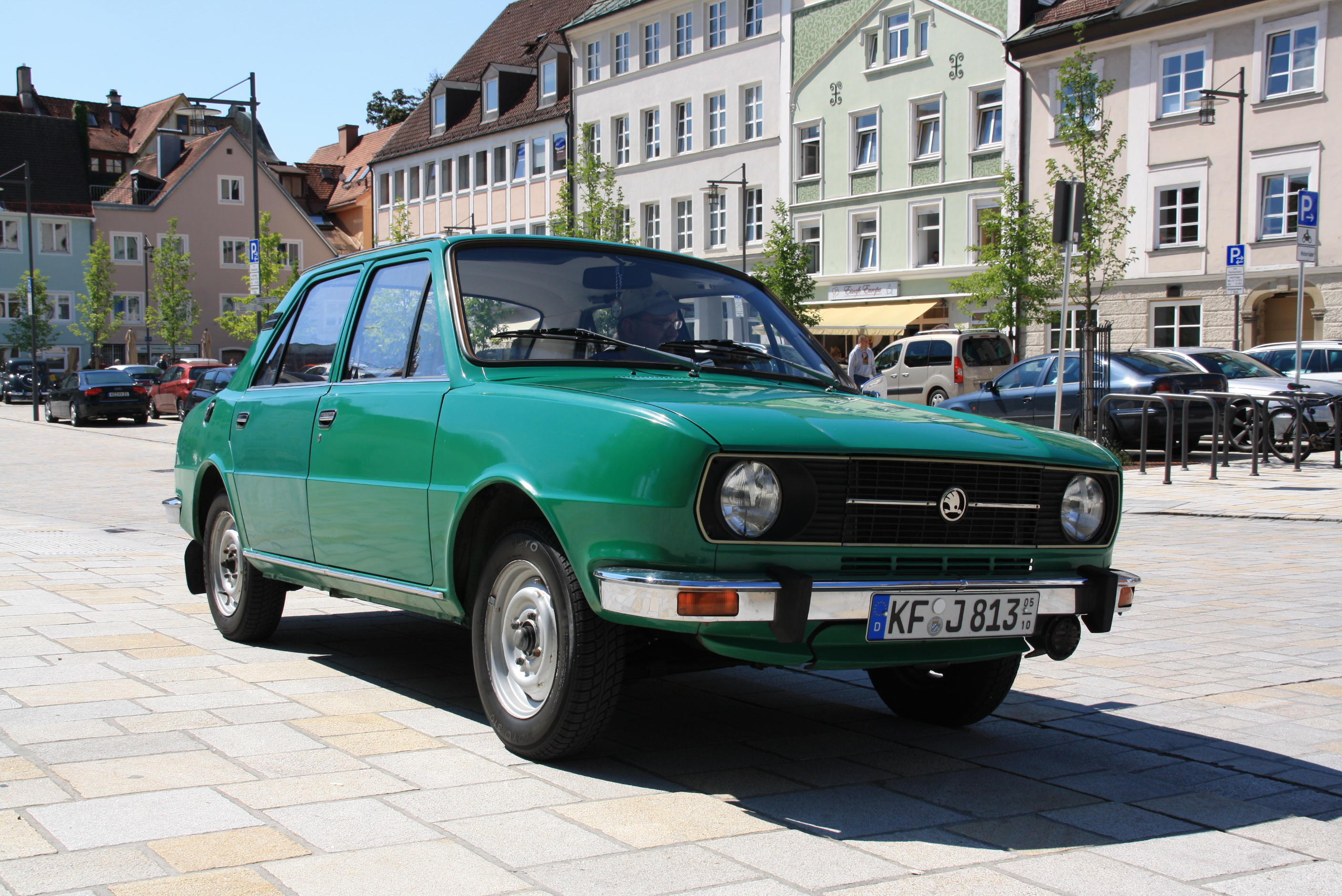
- 1978 Škoda 105

Overview
- Manufacturer: AZNP
- Also called: Škoda Estelle (UK, 1977–1978); Škoda Super Estelle (UK, 1978–1984); Škoda Estelle Two (UK, 1984–1990); Škoda Target (Greece); Škoda Amigo (Iceland)
- Production: 1976–1990
- Assembly: Czechoslovakia: Mladá Boleslav

Body and chassis
- Class: Compact car / Small family car
- Body style: 4-door saloon
- Layout: RR layout
- Related: Škoda Garde/Rapid

Powertrain
- Engine: 1046 cc I4; 1174 cc I4; 1289 cc I4
- Transmission: 4/5-speed manual

Dimensions
- Wheelbase: 2,400 mm (94.5 in)
- Length: 4,160 mm (163.8 in) (1976–1983); 4,200 mm (165.4 in) (1983–1990)
- Width: 1,595 mm (62.8 in) (1976–1983); 1,610 mm (63.4 in) (1983–1990)
- Height: 1,400 mm (55.1 in)

Chronology
- Predecessor: Škoda S100/110
- Successor: Škoda Favorit

The Škoda Type 742 and 746 is a family of rear-engined, rear-wheel drive small family car, produced by car manufacturer AZNP in Mladá Boleslav, Czechoslovakia between 1976 and 1990. The original models were the Škoda 105 and Škoda 120; a Škoda 125 variation arrived late in the production run. Engine sizes were 1.05, 1.2, and 1.3 liters, with late versions (135/136) using the new Favorit's engine being given the internal model code 746. Over two million were built in the type's 14-year production run.

The range was facelifted in 1983 with a revised design and engine improvements, together with the introduction of a new, 1.3-liter version known as the Škoda 130. Further 1.3-liter models followed in 1987 with the Škoda 135 and 136.

All 105/120/125 and 130 models known by their Škoda internal reference as Type 742, while the later 135 and 136 models are called Type 746. In the UK, the 105/120 models were known as the Super Estelle until 1984, when the face-lifted models were called Estelle Two.

== Initial design (A-series) ==
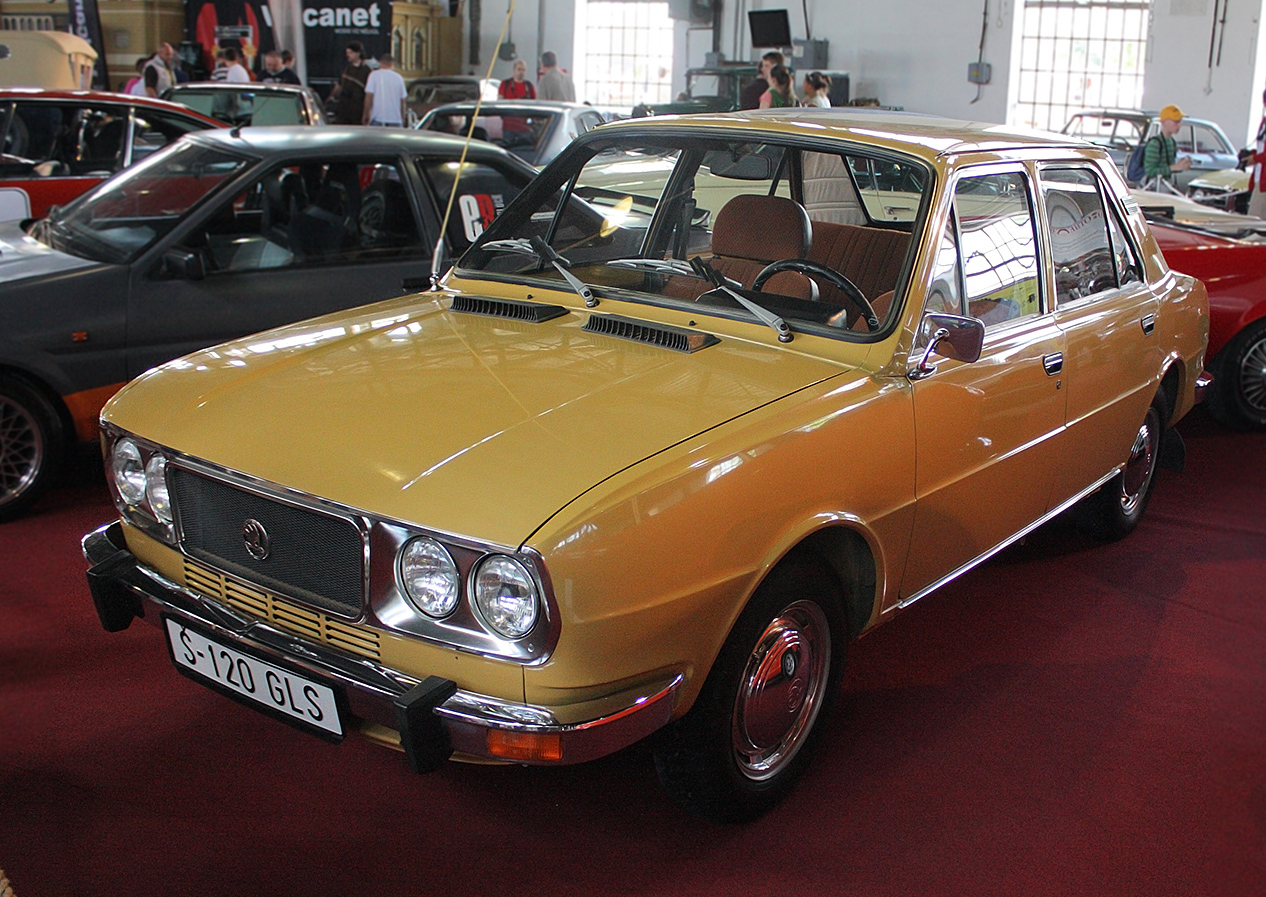
1978 Škoda 120 GLS

In the early 1970s, Škoda had originally intended to produce their successor to the S100/110 as a front-engined front-wheel drive model. However, because of the lack of funding (Škoda had even applied for license in Moscow to produce their new car with a front-engine and front-wheel drive), Škoda was refused a licence and was forced to update the earlier S100/110 saloon models. The main reason Škoda was not granted a licence to produce their new car was because it could have been more modern than cars from the Soviet Union. At that time, most cars from the Soviet Union had either a front engine driving the rear wheels or a rear engine driving the rear wheels. The new Škoda 105/120 was nonetheless designed to accept a front-engined, front-wheel drive layout later on. The company also finished a prototype with this layout, which looked almost identical to the rear-engined one.

The Škoda 105/120, given the internal model code "Type 742", went into production in August 1976. Despite being basically the same as the previous S100/110 under the skin, the new cars featured a lot of improvements, such as a front-mounted radiator with a thermostatic fan. The heating unit was now inside the dashboard, and the fuel tank was mounted beneath the rear seat rather than up front. All models had much the same mechanical specification as the previous models, with a four-speed gearbox, independent suspension at the front, worm-and-drive steering, and swing-axle rear suspension. An interesting feature found on the 105/120 was the side-hinged (front) bootlid, which opened up like the top of a concert piano.

The Škoda 105/120 was initially available in three model forms with a choice of two engines: the 105 S and 105 L were powered by the 1046 cc engine with 46 PS (34 kW; 45 bhp), while the 120 L was powered by the 1174 cc, 52 PS (38 kW; 51 bhp) engine. The 120 LS and 120 GLS models, which had the more powerful 1174 cc engine with 58 PS (43 kW; 57 bhp) and higher levels of equipment, joined the line-up in 1977 and 1978 respectively. Claimed power outputs dropped marginally towards the end of 1983. In France, Peugeot had trademarked "105" (and all other three-digit combinations with a zero in the middle), which meant that this model was sold as the Škoda 1050 there.

Until 1979, both 105 and 120 were equipped with 14" wheels with 155 SR 14 tyres, just like its predecessors the S100 and 1000 MB. In 1979 the cars' tread was increased and both models were given 13" wheels with 165 SR 13 tyres for all versions aside from the 120 GLS, which were equipped with 175/70 R13. This update was made in order to improve road handling, stability, performances and fuel consumption. Lower-end models (L, S) have single front headlights, while higher end models have twin headlamps. The basic 105 S had very spartan equipment; for example, the rear windows did not wind down, while the front seatbacks were fixed. It had no hazard lights until November 1979.

=== Initial criticism ===
The cars were initially criticised for unpredictable handling "at the limit" but it is unlikely that most motorists would notice anything untoward under normal conditions. The cars continued to win their class with monotonous regularity on international rallies, and were increasingly popular with budget-conscious motorists across Europe. The location of the radiator at the front of the car had the advantage of cooling the engine much more efficiently on the motorway. However, because it was much more complex than in the earlier models, the cooling system was very prone to airlocks, which often led to overheating and even head gasket failure.

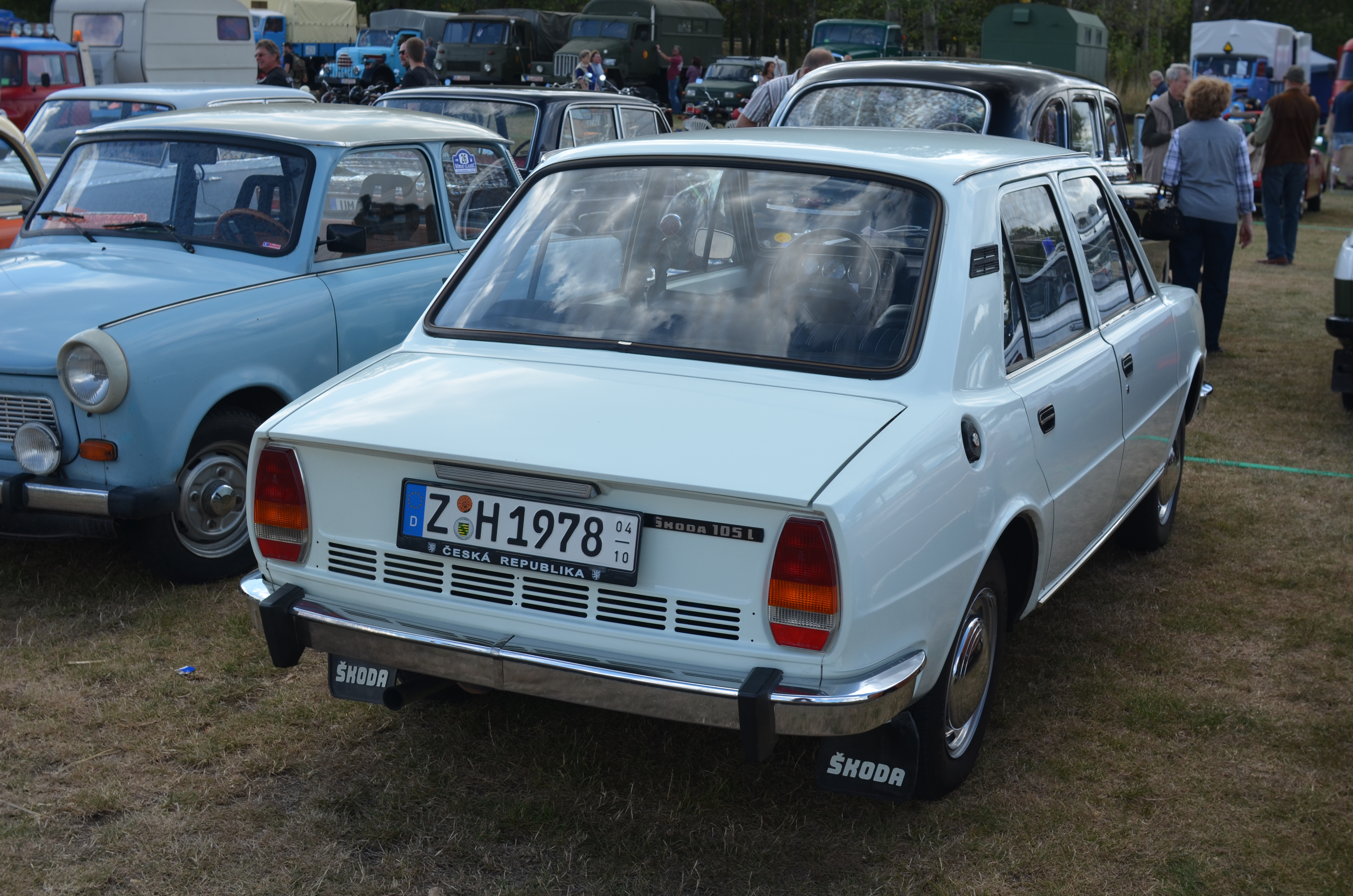
1978 Škoda 105 L model 1978, rear view (early pre-facelift, still with functional air vents)

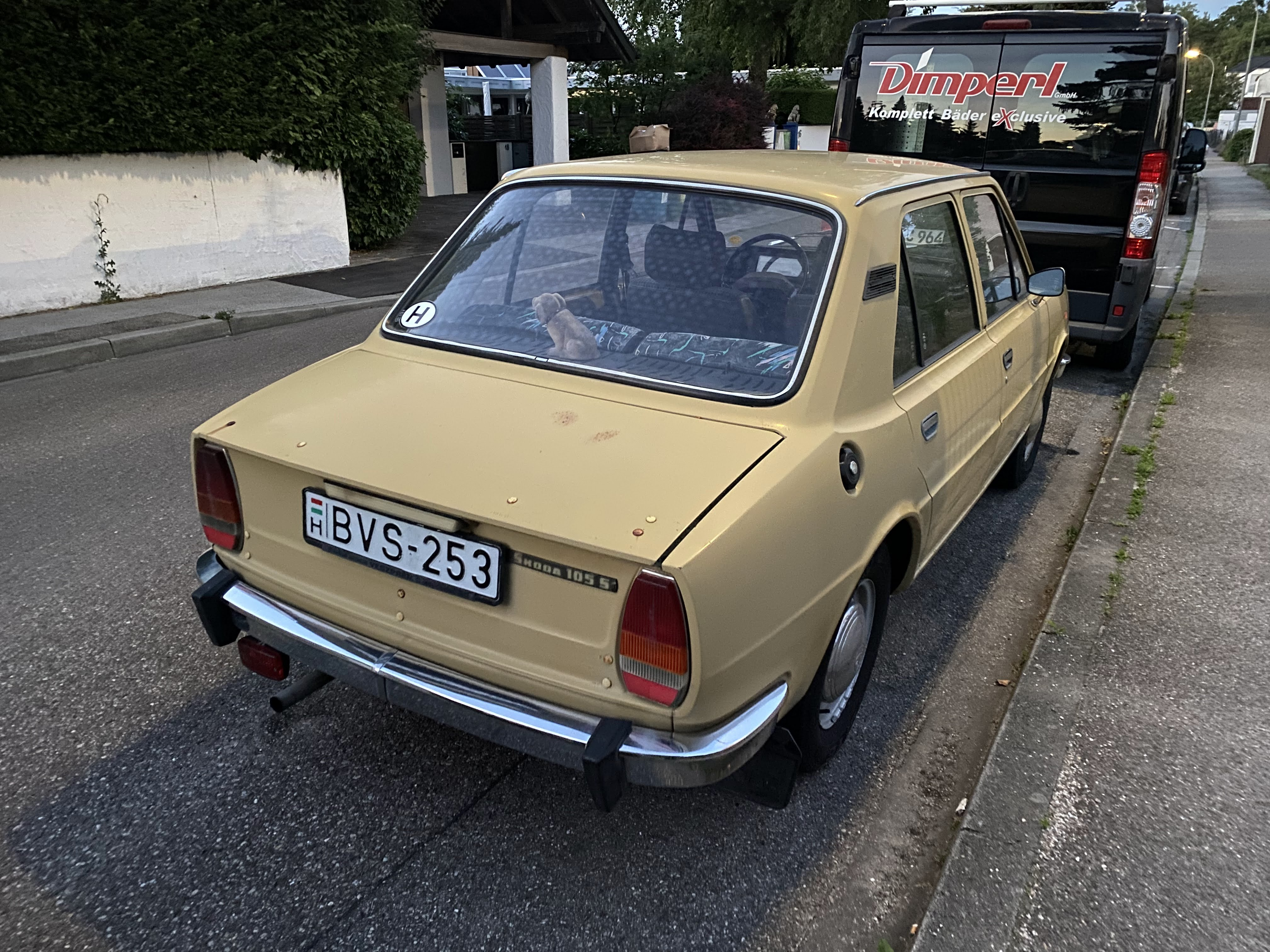
During 1978, the air vents were removed from the rear fascia sheet metal

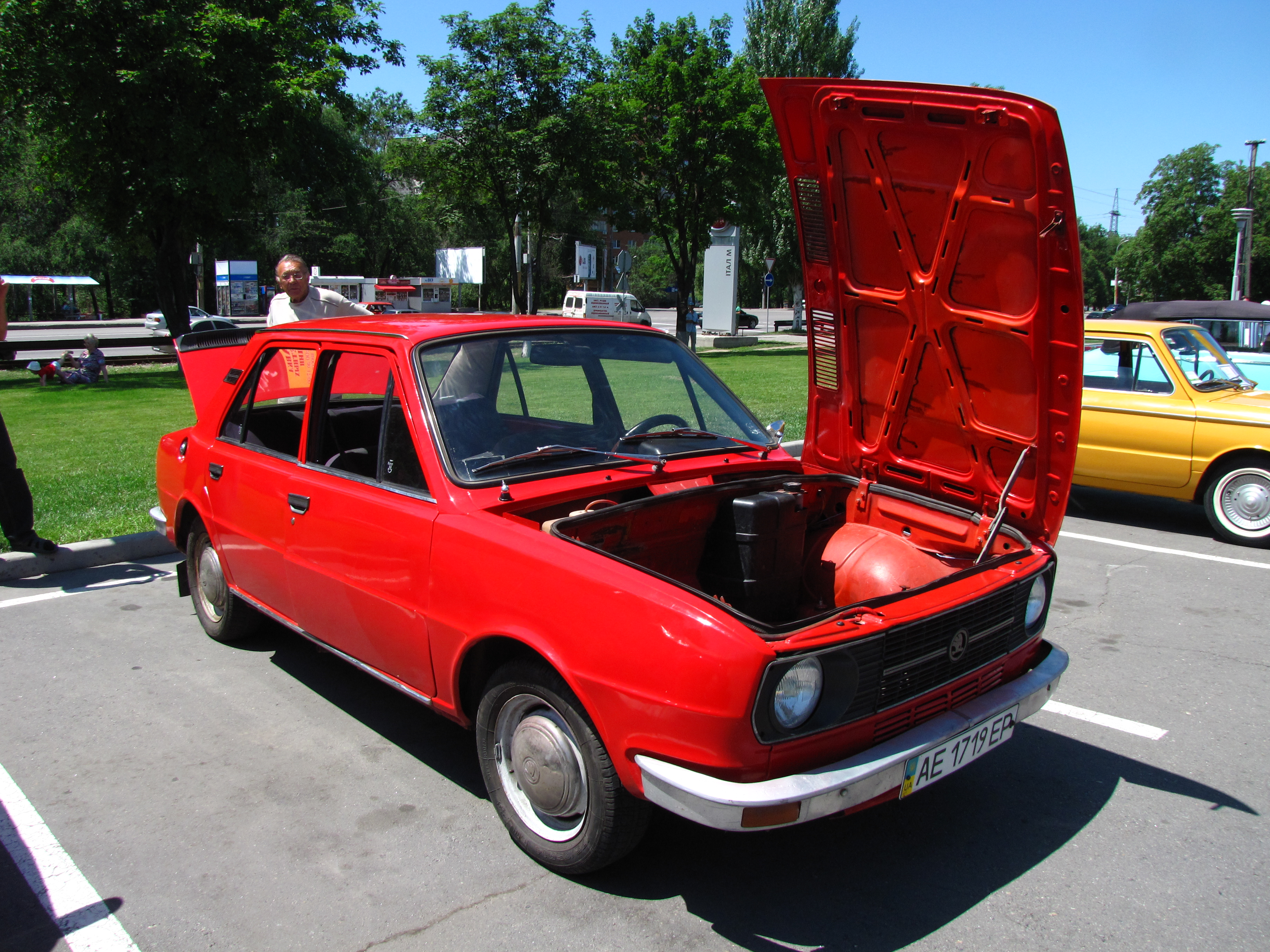
Škoda 105 L (1976–1982)

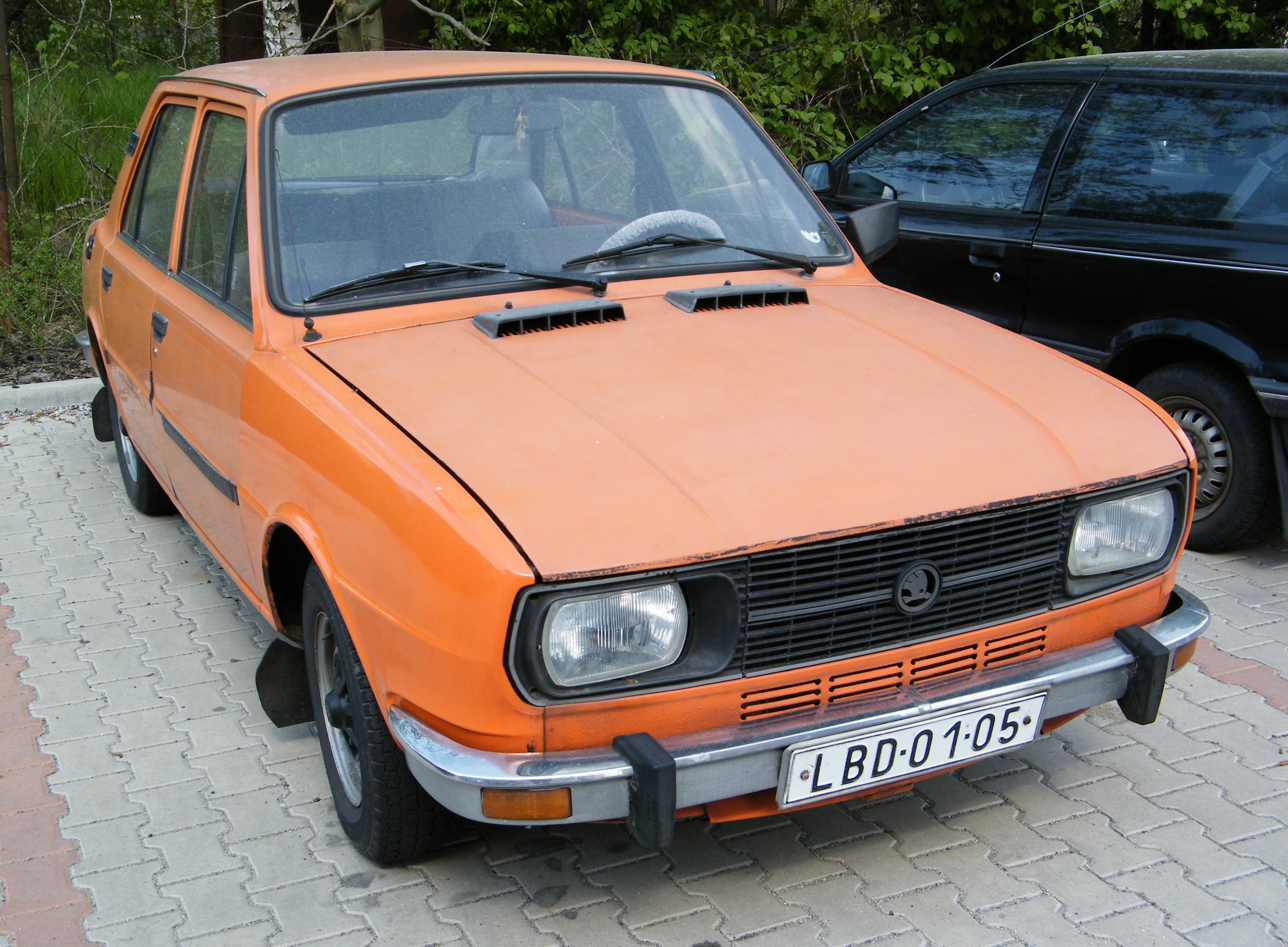
A facelifted 120 L (1981–1983)

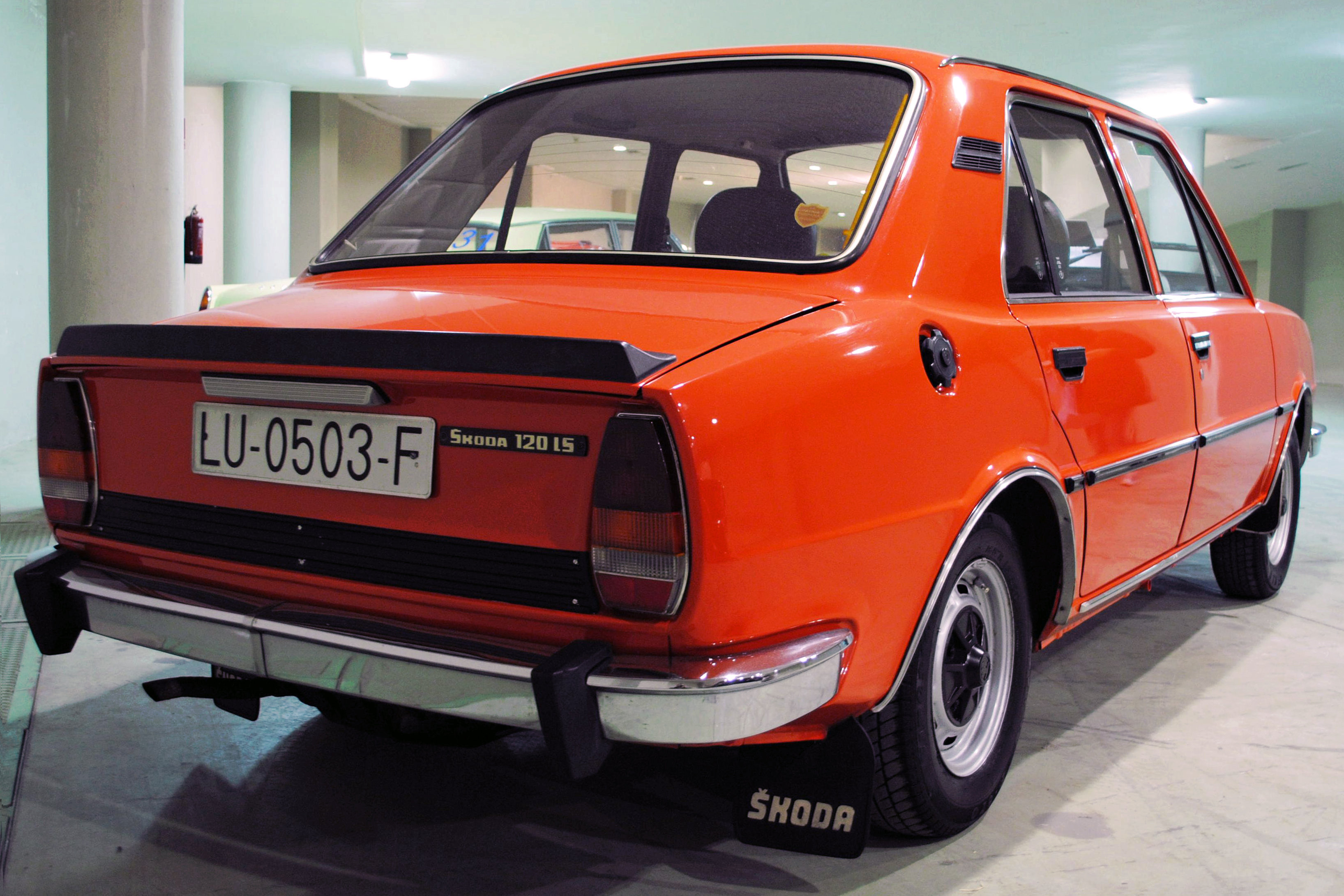
The rear design was also changed in the 1981 facelift, here a Škoda 120 LS

=== Improvements ===
The existing 105/120 lineup was joined with the 120 LS in 1977. It had a more powerful, 58 PS (43 kW; 57 bhp) version of the 1174 cc engine from the 120 L as well as a higher equipment level. April 1978 saw the arrival of the top-spec 120 GLS as well as the 120 standard model. On cars built before June 1978, there are perforated slits on the engine lid. These openings proved unnecessary for cooling, however, while they also dirtied the engine compartment. The manufacturer recommended owners of earlier examples to block these openings.

In March 1981, the 105 GL was added to the lineup. It was mechanically identical to the existing 105 S and 105 L models only it featured the equipment specification of the 120 GLS model. Both the 105 GL and the 120 GLS were given black bumpers and horizontal taillights. The headlights on the single headlamp models were updated to slightly wider, more oval units, except for on the 105 S which retained round units until the M-series facelift.

In November 1981, the range was supplemented by the Škoda Garde, a two-door fastback coupé equipped with the 1174 cc, 58 PS (43 kW; 57 bhp) engine from the 120 LS and 120 GLS saloons. This had a much improved semi-trailing arm rear suspension, and paved the way for the later facelift models. The later coupé Škoda Rapid was a facelifted version of Škoda Garde.

In November 1982, the 105 SP and 120 LE were added to the range. The 105 SP essentially a commercial version of the 105 S, having no rear seats and no glass just solid metal in the rear doors; it was only available in Czechoslovakia, sometimes used for postal delivery. The 120 LE was identical to the 120 L but with a modified final drive ratio to improve fuel economy (hence 'E' for Economic).

== Second generation (M-series) ==
In September 1983, the range was given a facelift and technical modernization, becoming the "742M" in internal parlance. New, rectangular headlamps and blocky, rubber bumpers made it look more up-to-date and also improved the car's aerodynamics. The steering was updated to rack and pinion steering rather than the earlier recirculating ball design. Power outputs dropped marginally, to 45, 50, and 55 PS (33, 37, and 40 kW) for the 105, 120, and better equipped 120 variants respectively.

The Škoda 130 models followed the next year, introducing additional improvements some of which were also adopted into the existing 105/120 range. The very first Škoda 130 models were introduced in August 1984. Developed from the earlier Škoda 105/120 models, the 130 series used a new 1289 cc engine and also received a redesigned rear suspension. The new design was a semi-trailing arm layout first introduced on the Škoda Garde in late 1981, and the track of the car was widened to 1,395 mm (54.9 in). 105s and 120s retained the earlier, swing-arm design at the rear. Producing 58 PS (43 kW; 57 bhp), the engine is an enlarged version of the 1174 cc engine used in the 120 series. A later, updated version of this engine also saw use in the car's successor, the Škoda Favorit. The Saloon versions of the new 130 series were available in 130 L and 130 GL forms and the Coupé model was the 130 Rapid, which were broadly the same as the smaller-engined 120 LS and GLS Saloons and 120 Rapid Coupé.

5-speed gearboxes and "four pot" front brake disc calipers were other updates. The new models countered the earlier criticism that had been made in some quarters of tail-happy handling, with the prominent UK motoring magazine "Autocar and Motor" remarking in 1988 that the new 136 Rapid model "handles like a Porsche 911".

In 1987, with the introduction of the new Škoda Favorit, the Škoda 105/120 series was trimmed to just the 105 L, 105 SP, 120 L and 120 GL. The 125 L (which was identical to the 120 L but with a 5-speed gearbox) was added in October 1988 and was the final new model to evolve from the 105/120 series.

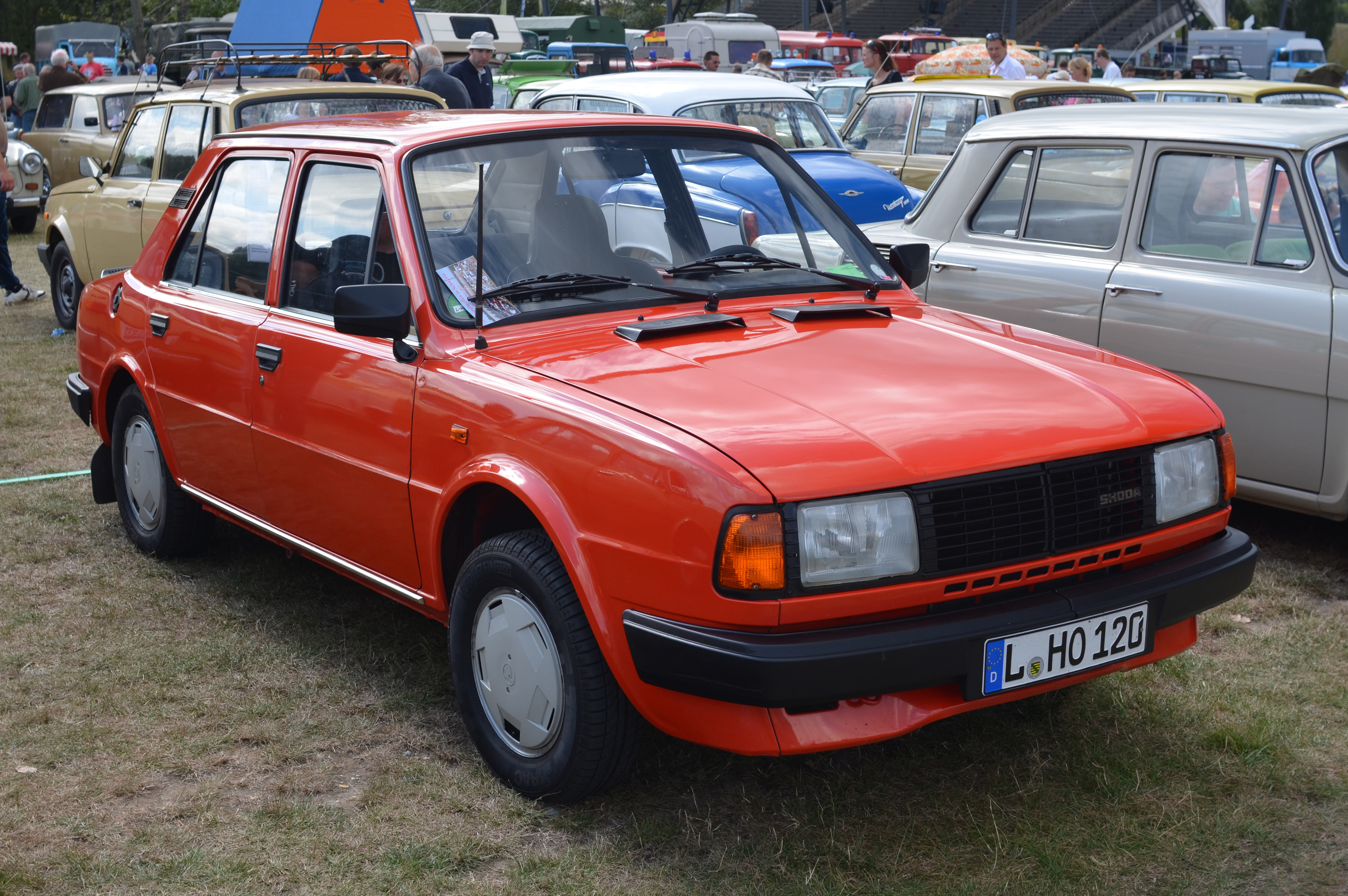
Škoda 120 L

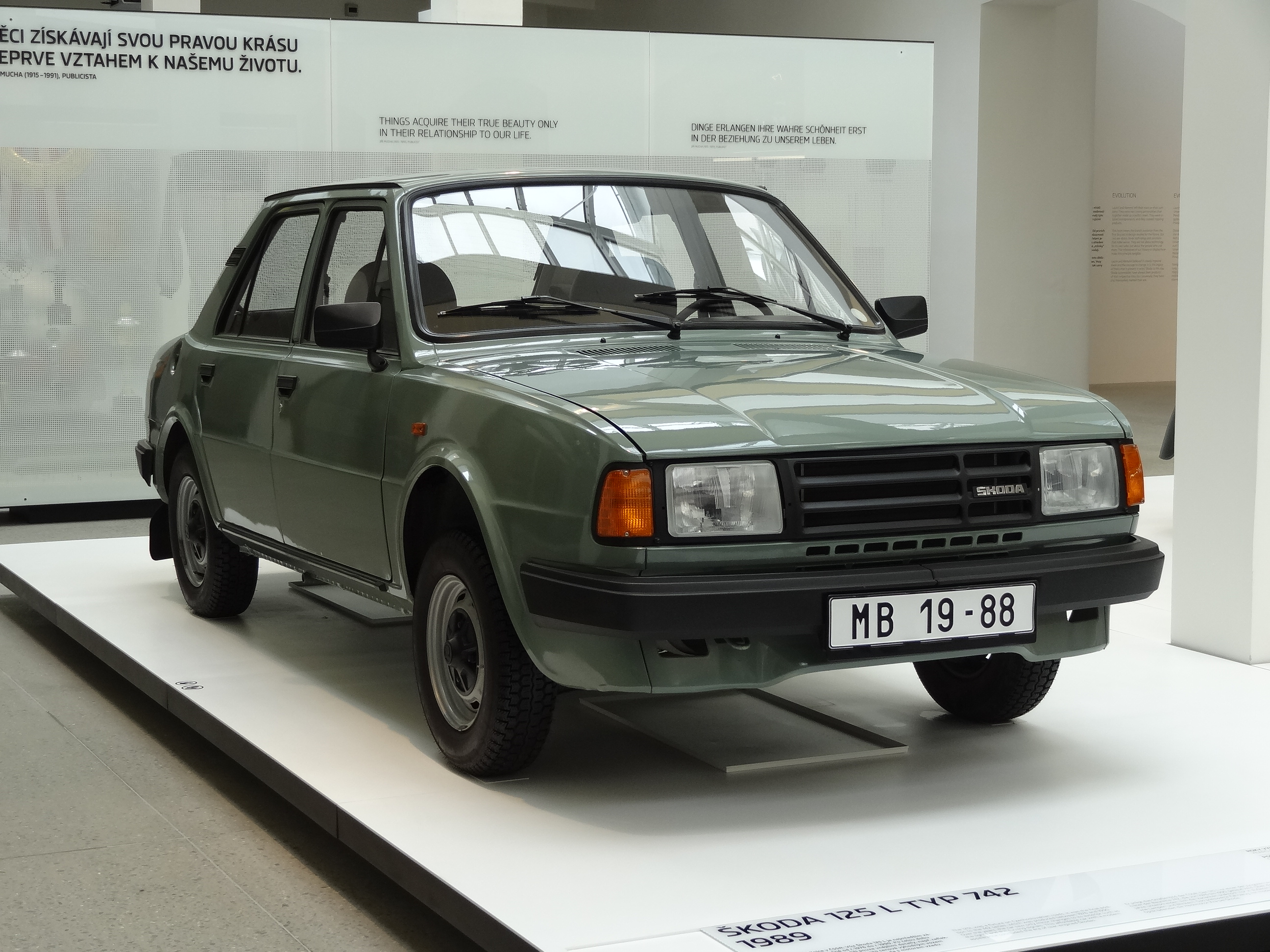
Facelifted Škoda 125

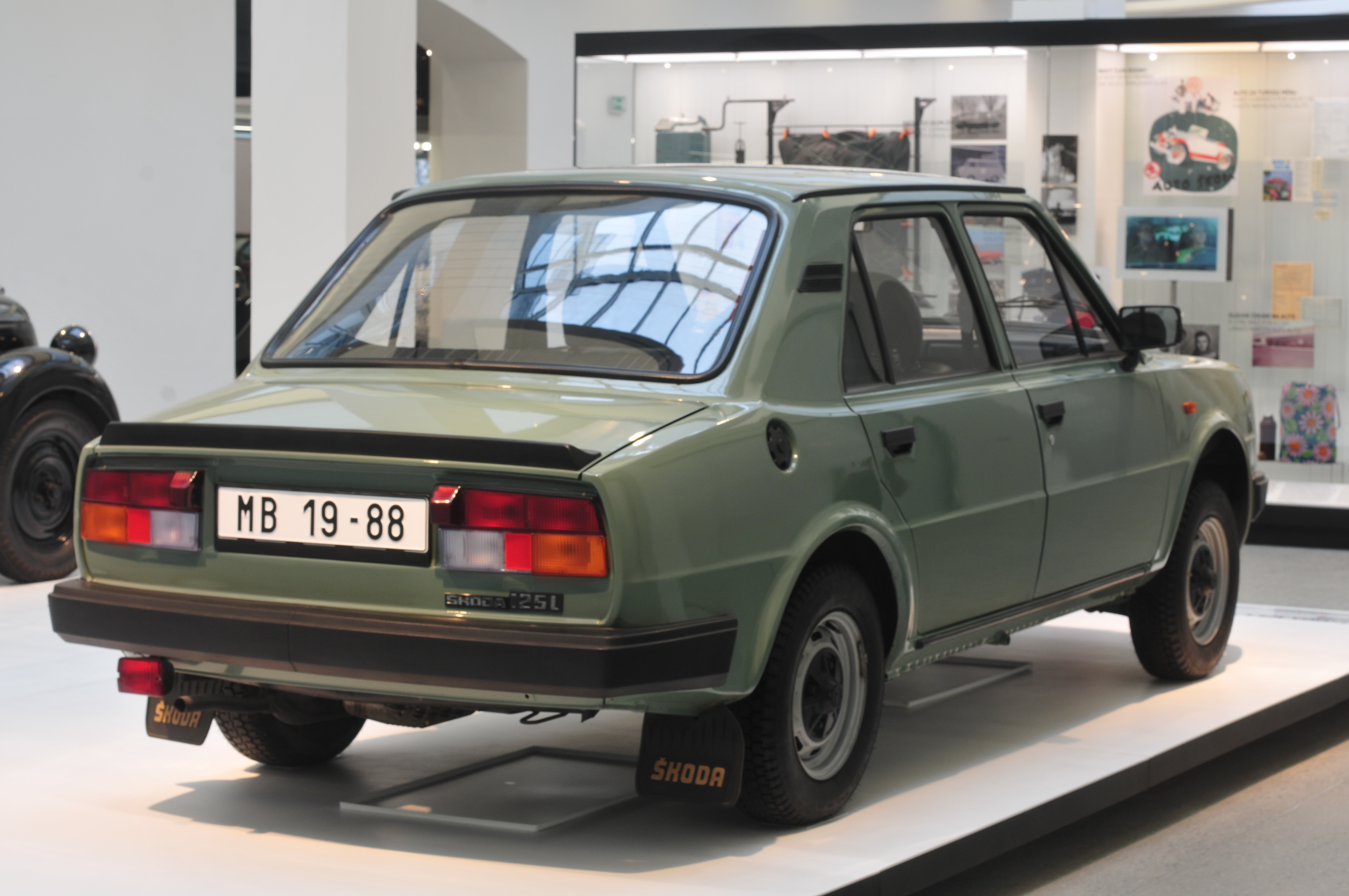
Facelifted Škoda 125 L, rear view

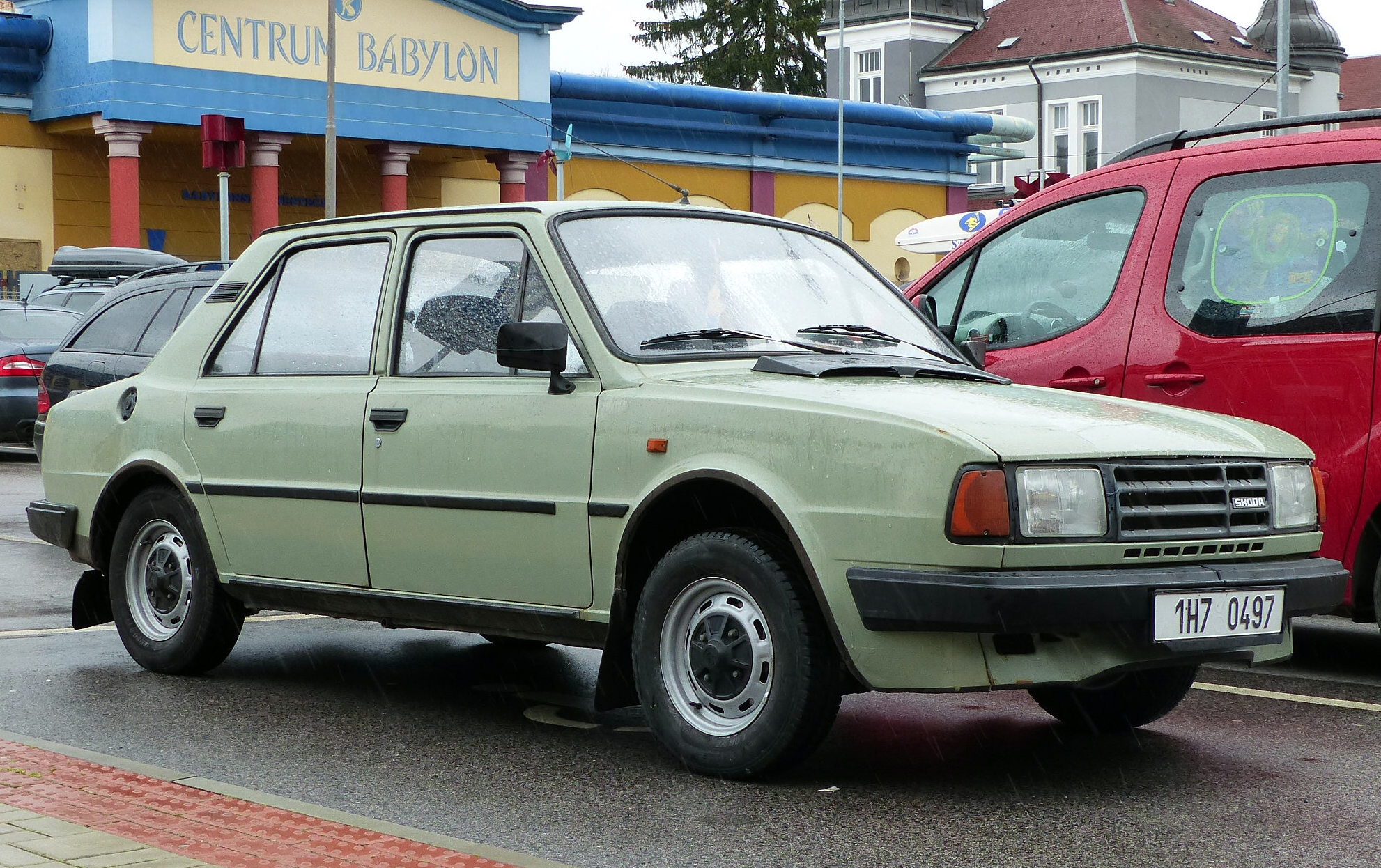
1988–1989 Škoda 135 L

=== 135/136 ===
The final models to evolve from the rear-engined Škoda generation were the Škoda 135/136 series, introduced in April 1987. The new models (which were available in exactly the same model forms as the earlier 130 series) had an uprated 1289 cc engine (this was the same engine that was also used in the Škoda Favorit), with an output of 58 PS (43 kW) for the 135 models, and a higher output of 62 PS (46 kW) for the 136 models (which had a higher compression ratio than the 135 models). These new models also had a new front grille, also fitted to the remaining models of the 105/120 series. Inside, the only change was a new instrument panel.

The main difference between the 130 and the 135/136 was the engine's cylinder head: the 130 had a 5-port cast-iron cylinder head, which couldn't use unleaded gasoline, whilst 135 engines had an aluminium 8-port cylinder head, which could use unleaded gasoline. The 136 engine was the same as the 135's, but with a higher compression ratio for better performance. In December 1989, a fuel injected version arrived, although it was only available in a few markets.

=== End of production ===
From 1989 onward, production of the rear-engined models was gradually wound down as production of the Škoda Favorit progressed. Production of the 105 SP and 130 series ended in July 1988, followed by the 105 L and 120 GL in January and November 1989. After a production run of fourteen years, which included a total of 2,013,745 saloons of all types, production of the 120 L and 125 L (the last remaining models of the Type 742) in Škoda's factories in Mladá Boleslav ended in January 1990. The 135 and 136 (Type 746) continued to be built at Vrchlabí (where the better-equipped Škodas were typically assembled) for a few months longer, while Rapids were built in Škoda's Kvasiny plant until August 1990.

A 2004 survey revealed that among the 3,706,012 cars registered in the Czech Republic, 1,780,124 were Škodas. At 305,726 cars, the Škoda 120 was the largest model represented, while there were 216,857 Škoda 105 cars, which made that model the fourth most common Škoda car.

== Model by model ==
Model	Type	Produced	Engine	Bore × Stroke	Power	Transmission	Number built
Škoda 105 S	742.10	1976–1986	1046 cc I4	68 × 72 mm	46 PS (34 kW) after 08/83: 45 PS (33 kW)	4-speed manual	840,561
Škoda 105 L	742.10	1976–1988	1046 cc I4	68 × 72 mm	46 PS (34 kW) after 08/83: 45 PS (33 kW)	4-speed manual	840,561
Škoda 105 GL	742.10	1981–1983	1046 cc I4	68 × 72 mm	46 PS (34 kW) after 08/83: 45 PS (33 kW)	4-speed manual	840,561
Škoda 105 SP	742.10	1982–1988	1046 cc I4	68 × 72 mm	46 PS (34 kW) after 08/83: 45 PS (33 kW)	4-speed manual	840,561
Škoda 120	742.12	1978–1983	1174 cc I4	72 × 72 mm	52 PS (38 kW) after 08/83: 50 PS (37 kW)	4-speed manual	1,070,693
Škoda 120 L	742.12	1976–1990	1174 cc I4	72 × 72 mm	52 PS (38 kW) after 08/83: 50 PS (37 kW)	4-speed manual	1,070,693
Škoda 120 LE	742.12	1982–1983	1174 cc I4	72 × 72 mm	52 PS (38 kW) after 08/83: 50 PS (37 kW)	4-speed manual	1,070,693
Škoda 120 GL	742.12	1984–1989	1174 cc I4	72 × 72 mm	52 PS (38 kW) after 08/83: 50 PS (37 kW)	4-speed manual	1,070,693
Škoda 120 LS	742.12X	1976–1987	1174 cc I4	72 × 72 mm	58 PS (43 kW) after 08/83: 55 PS (40 kW)	4-speed manual	1,070,693
Škoda 120 LX	742.12X	1984–1987	1174 cc I4	72 × 72 mm	58 PS (43 kW) after 08/83: 55 PS (40 kW)	5-speed manual	1,070,693
Škoda 120 GLS	742.12X	1976–1987	1174 cc I4	72 × 72 mm	58 PS (43 kW) after 08/83: 55 PS (40 kW)	4-speed manual (1976–1984); 5-speed manual (1984–1987)	1,070,693
Škoda 125 L	742.12X	1988–1990	1174 cc I4	72 × 72 mm	58 PS (43 kW) after 08/83: 55 PS (40 kW)	5-speed manual	50,041
Škoda 130	742.13	1984–1988	1289 cc I4	75.5 × 72 mm	58 PS (43 kW) or: 61 PS (45 kW)	5-speed manual (semi-trailing arm rear suspension)	50,819
Škoda 135	746.135	1988–1990	1289 cc I4	75.5 × 72 mm	58 PS (43 kW) or: 56 PS (41 kW) (with Bendix fuel injection)	5-speed manual (semi-trailing arm rear suspension)	6,603
Škoda 136	746.136	1987–1990	1289 cc I4	75.5 × 72 mm	62 PS (46 kW)	5-speed manual (semi-trailing arm rear suspension)	5,857
Total production (saloons):							2,013,745

1.3-liter timeline

- August 1984: Introduction of the Škoda 130 series. Available as: 130 L 4-door Saloon (Type 742.13) and 130 Rapid 2-door Coupé (Type 743.13).
- August 1986: Introduction of the 130 GL 4-door Saloon.
- April 1987: Introduction of the Škoda 135/136 series. Available as: 135 L and 135 GL 4-door Saloons (Types 746.135), 135 Rapid 2-door Coupé (Type 747.135), 136 L and 136 GL 4-door Saloons (Type 746.136), and 136 Rapid 2-door Coupé (Type 747.136).
- July 1988: End of production of the 130 series.
- August 1990: End of production of the 135/136 series, bringing production of the rear-engined Škoda generation to a close.

== Market differences ==
=== Britain ===
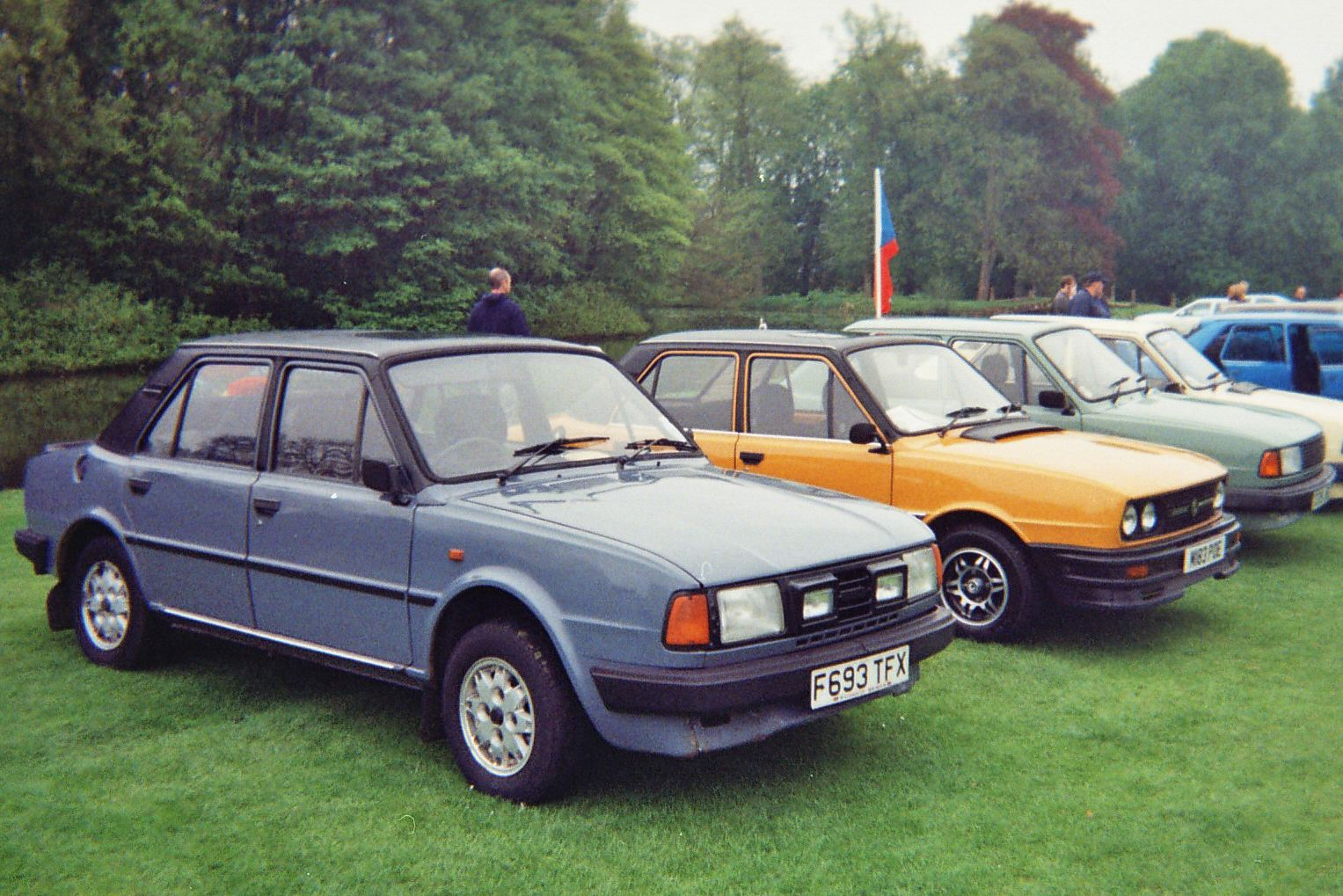
Line-up of Škoda Estelles at the Wartburg/Trabant/IFA Club UK Rally 2006

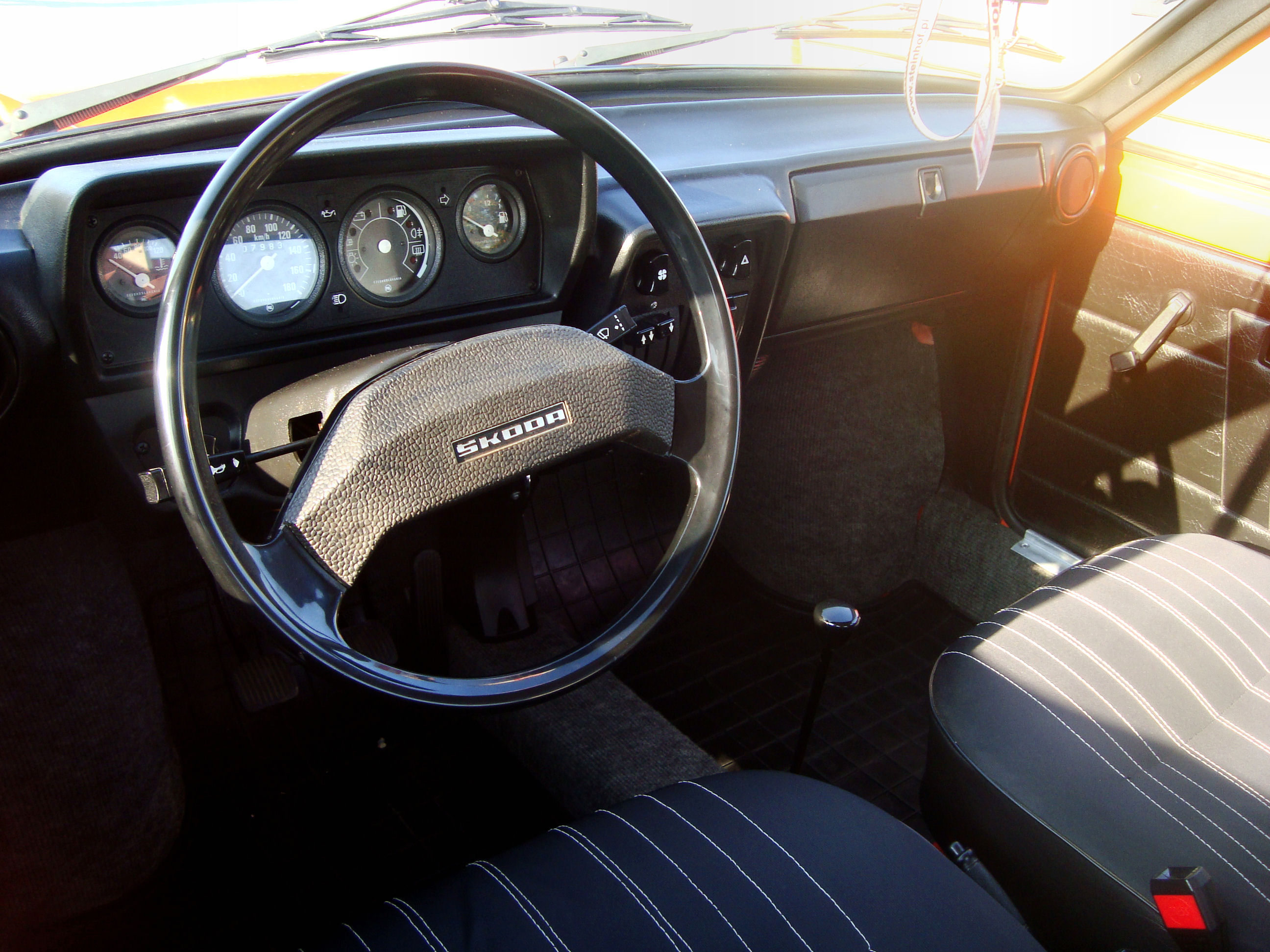
Interior of Škoda 120 L from 1982

In the UK, the Škoda 105/120 range was sold under the name Škoda Estelle, a name created by Alan Blavins of Škoda GB's then advertising agency, Childs Greene, who were based a few blocks away from Škoda's office and showroom in Clerkenwell, London. The screen printed anodised aluminium front grille Estelle badges were designed by Alan Blavins and sourced by Jim Hubbard of Childs Greene for Škoda. The Estelle proved popular with 120,105 cars finding homes between May 1977 and March 1990. In 1987 alone (which was three years short of the end of the cars' production run), UK Škoda dealers managed to sell 17,000 rear-engined Škodas of all types, despite the cars negative image, individual handling and outdated technology and serious problems with the head gasket condition. Its main selling points were its spacious interior, dependability, ease of maintenance and low asking price. Reliability was often a strong point with these cars, some of which have reached over the 100,000-mile (160,000 km) point and are still running to the present day due to good maintenance. Škoda made great play in its advertising of its consistent class wins in the RAC rallies in the 1970s and 80s with the Estelle.

The 130 models made their UK debut in March 1985 and were available in both Estelle 130 L and 130 LSE 4-door saloon and 130 Rapid 2-door Coupé forms, with an aftermarket Cabriolet version of the Rapid also available. The Estelle 130 GL, which was available in Eastern Europe from August 1986, arrived in the UK market in May 1987. The UK market got the 136 Rapid Coupé and Cabriolet models in August 1988, followed by the rare fuel-injected Rapid 135 RiC Coupé in December 1989. Both these, and the Estelle 120 L and 120 L Five Saloons, were discontinued just four months later. The Estelle and Rapid were very competitive cars, which helped Škoda to new sales records in Western Europe in the late 1980s (about 17,000 105/120/130 models were sold in the UK in 1987 alone).

The new 130 models silenced the earlier criticism that had been made in some quarters of tail-happy handling, with the prominent UK motoring magazine "Autocar and Motor" remarking in 1988 that the new 136 Rapid model "handles like a Porsche 911" in that the rear-engine design encouraged oversteer.

Like the smaller-engined Škoda 105/120, the Škoda 130/135/136 gradually became a rare sight on Britain's roads by the time the 21st century dawned. With just 612 of the Škoda 105/120 range still registered in the UK, it is unclear how many of the Škoda 130 series have survived. Due to their rarity in the UK, prices for good 130s are rising.

In August 2006, an Auto Express survey revealed that just 612 Škoda Estelles sold in Britain were still registered with the DVLA, which officially made it the fifth most scrapped car in Britain sold in the last 30 years - although it can be argued that much of this reduction in numbers could be attributed to mass re-exportation of the vehicles back to Eastern Europe (as was also the case with contemporary Lada vehicles of the same era) where they were worth much more, as opposed to scrappage. The four cars with a higher rate for scrappings had all finished production at least four years before the Estelle. With the Škoda Estelle being the last mass-produced rear-engined small family car in Europe, not to mention the fact it is becoming increasingly rare in the UK, prices for good examples are rising.

Special models

- 105 Lux (1984–1989) - Name given to the 105 L after the 1984 model year but had otherwise the same equipment and trim as the 120 L apart from a slight difference in the headlights.
- 120 LSE (1979–1987) - Same as the 120 LS plus vinyl roof, sunroof, tinted glass and stereo radio/cassette player. During the 1981-1984 period, there were no 120 LS models available only to special order.
- 120 LXE (1987) - Same as the 120 LX plus sunroof, tinted glass and stereo radio/cassette player. It was only available for several months until it was replaced by the 120 L 'Five'.
- 120 L Five (1987–1990) - Same as the 120 L, plus 5-speed gearbox, sunroof, front door pockets, digital clock and stereo radio/cassette player.
- Rapid 120 CE (1984) - limited edition of 90 released to celebrate Škoda's 90th anniversary, featuring golden alloy wheels and all-black paint with gold stripes along the flanks.
- 130 LSE (1985–1988) - Developed from the 130 L with the 120 LSE specification.
- Rapid Cabriolet (1984–1990) - Developed from the Rapid at Ludgate Design Developments in Kent initially in Standard form only, which included a removable full-sized hood and a central rollover T-bar. The rarer Lux model available from 1987 had wind down rear quarter lights. At least 334 cabriolets were sold in Britain.

=== Finland ===
The 105 and the 120 sold well in Finland in the late 1970s. During the 1980s Škoda's sales in Finland took a small plummet but nothing of concern. The 105 and the 120 were imported with no tweaks except some extra options to help them get through Finland's snowy roads more easily.

- 105 Super - this name was given to the later 105 S.
- 120 LSX - special edition model available in 1984 to celebrate Škoda's ninetieth Anniversary.
- 130 LX - this model fitted between the 130 L and 130 GL, using Saab seats installed by the importer.
- 135 GLi - this fuel-injected four-door saloon model was technically similar to the rare Rapid 135 RiC which was offered in Britain and Austria.

=== West Germany ===
There was a 105 LS model available specially in West Germany, but it was not a strong seller and could not hope to compete with the leading favourites: Volkswagen Golf, Volkswagen Jetta, Opel Kadett and Ford Escort. Overall sales were predictable in Germany.

=== Greece ===
Sales of the Škoda 105/120 range in Greece were strong, though it was never able to match the success of established Western European and Japanese models. Its main selling points were its low price, ease of maintenance and spacious interior. The low price was a particular consideration during the recession of the late 1970s and early 1980s. They had a good reputation for being rugged and robust vehicles and they were considered by some drivers as "the real cars" for all possible uses and needs.

The 120 standard model was never imported in Greece. After the Škoda 105/120 models were given a mild revamp in early 1984, the whole 105/120/130 range was sold under the name Škoda Target.

By the early 1990s, it was obvious more than ever that the rear-engined range had already become a far cry from the needs of the Greek drivers. As a result, the Škoda 105/120 and 130/135/136 models rapidly disappeared from Greek roads. Since the 2000s, they became a non-existent kind on Greek roads.

- 105 Sport - this name was given to the 105 S (instead of Standard), although in reality it was exactly the opposite! After 1983, the 105 S was no longer imported, meaning that there was no such thing as a "Target 105 S" available.
- 120 LS / 120 GLS - Both had front door pockets, tachometer, and since 1984: 5-speed gearbox, digital clock and stereo radio/cassette player. Only the 120 GLS could be ordered with sunroof.
- Target 120 L 5-speed - Same as the 120 L, plus 5-speed gearbox, front door pockets, digital clock and stereo radio/cassette player.

=== Poland ===
- 130 L - identical to the 130 GL.

=== New Zealand ===
The Škoda 105/120 was imported into New Zealand in the late 1970s and proved to be an affordable, popular and robust "no-frills" vehicle, comparing well against equivalent British imports. There was a political scandal though in the early 1980s when it was falsely reported that a batch of imported Škodas were made with Czech prison labour (such imports are forbidden under New Zealand law), but imports were allowed to continue when it was determined that the importer knew nothing about this aspect of the vehicles' construction.

The car also got a political reputation at the General Election in 1984, when a defeated National Party MP, Pat Hunt, derisively referred to his Social Credit Party opponent, Neil Morrison, who won the seat as a member of "the Crimplene suit and Škoda brigade".

=== Australia ===
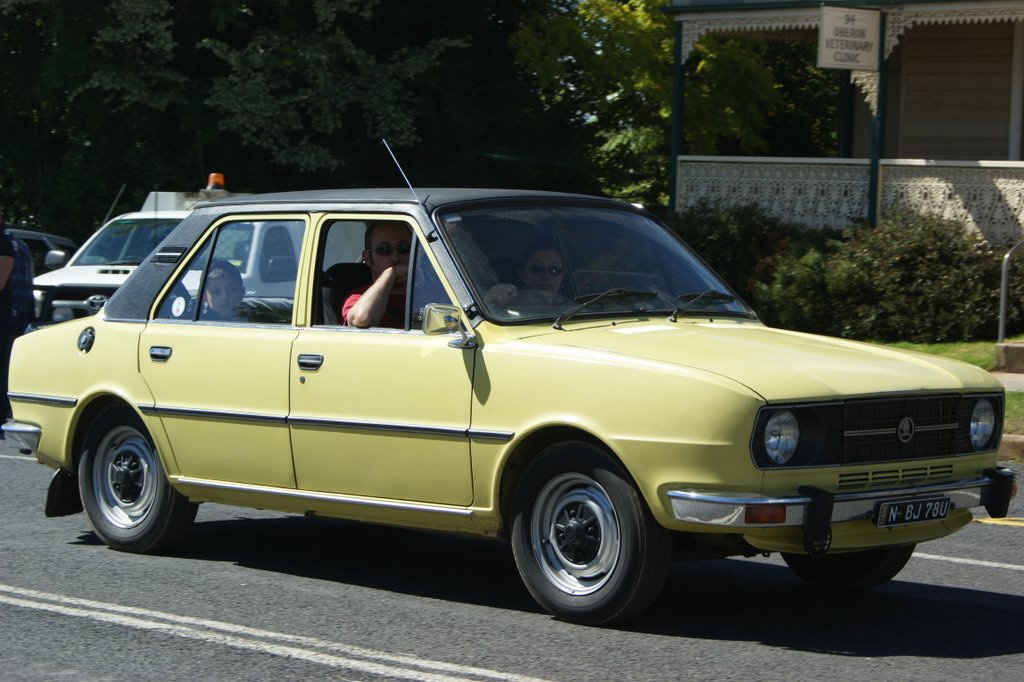
Škoda Type 742 (model 105 or 120) in New South Wales

The Škoda 120L was sold in Australia during the late 1970s and early 1980s though sales suffered from laws that limited numbers imported annually due to their being manufactured in Czechoslovakia which was a communist state. Despite this the 120L received a positive response from the motoring press who acknowledged it as offering good value for money. This was the last Škoda model sold in Australia until the 2007 launch of the Škoda Octavia and Škoda Roomster. It is estimated that approximately 21 Škoda 120L's survive in Australia.

=== Canada ===
- 135 GLi - this fuel-injected four-door saloon model was technically similar to the rare Rapid 135 RiC that was offered in Britain and Austria.

=== Iceland ===
In Iceland the Škoda 105 S and L were sold, in some numbers. The 120 was imported between 1977 and 1989, with the last examples registered in 1990. These models were sometimes sold as the Škoda Amigo in Iceland.

== Competition ==
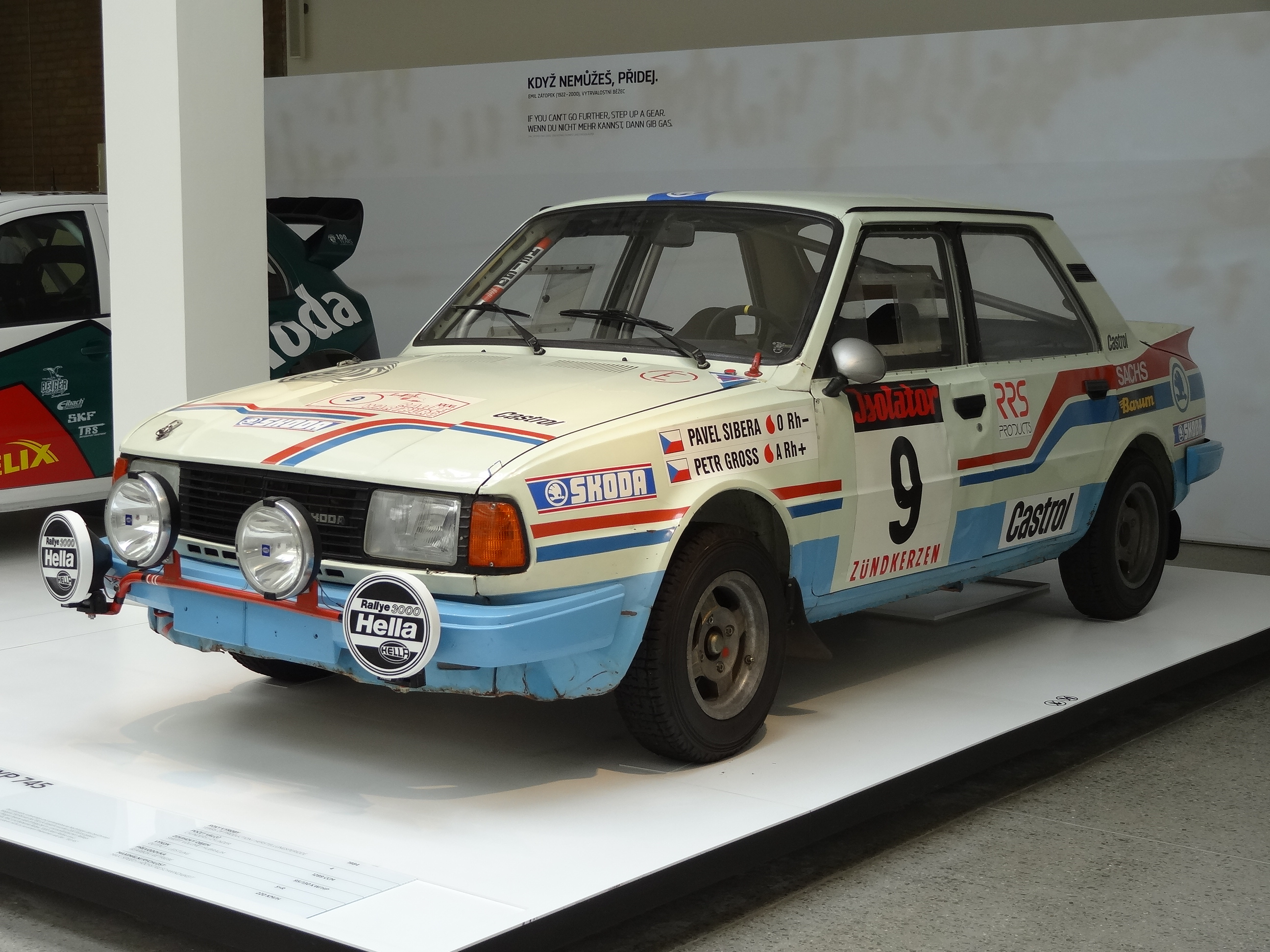
Škoda 130 LR rally car in the Škoda Museum

The 1.3 Škoda Estelle was an unlikely hero of the Rallying world in the '70s and '80s. The Škoda Motorsport works team won their class for 17 years running on the RAC Rally, and also claimed class wins on many other world and European championship rallies. Many of the team's drivers were selected from among the company's staff, although foreign professionals did drive for Škoda as well, most notably Norwegian driver John Haugland.

Until the mid-1980s Škoda used the 120 model, before building a lightweight and more powerful car, the 130 LR, to conform to the Group B rules. After Group B was banned, at the end of the 1986 season, the team reverted to Group A cars, and used the 130 L model until the arrival of the Favorit in 1989. It is interesting to note that a Group B 130 won its class on the 1987 RAC Rally, as the ban did not apply to 1300 cc cars until the following season.
