= Amy Harper (disambiguation) =

Amy Harper may refer to:

- Amy Merania Harper, New Zealand photographer
- Amy Harper (swimmer); see Swimming at the 2011 Island Games
