= Wiren =

Wiren is a surname. Notable people with the surname include:

- Andy Wiren (1911–1998), New Zealand cricketer
- Dag Wiren (1905-1986), Swedish composer
- Gary Wiren (born 1935), American golf instructor
- Nyle Wiren (born 1973), American football player

== See also ==
- Wiren Becker
- Wiren (film), a Surinamese film
