= Pakuranga (electorate) =

- Single-member general constituency for the New Zealand House of Representatives
- Interactive map of boundaries from the 2026 election
- Formation: 1963
- Region: Auckland
- Character: Suburban
- Term: 3 years

Member for Pakuranga
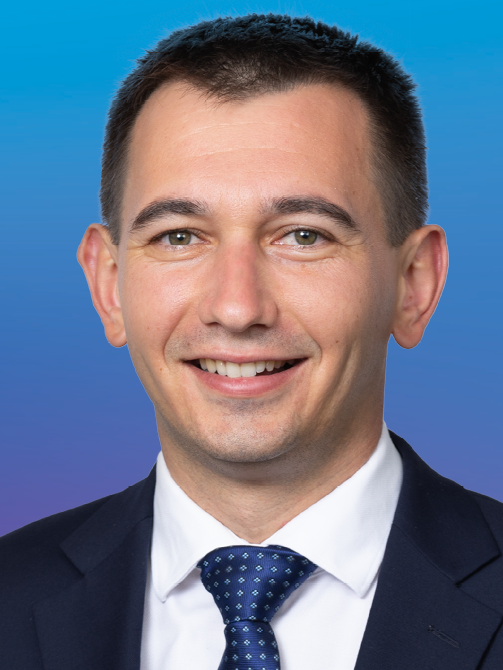
- Simeon Brown since 23 September 2017
- Party: National
- List MPs: Parmjeet Parmar (ACT)
- Previous MP: Maurice Williamson (National)
Party vote distribution

Pakuranga is a New Zealand Parliamentary electorate. It gave the Social Credit Party one of its few MPs when Neil Morrison held the seat from 1984 to 1987, but otherwise the electorate seat has been held by the National Party since 1972. Its current MP is Simeon Brown who has held the electorate since the 2017 general election.

== Population centres ==
Pakuranga is one of 64 general electorates used in New Zealand general elections. It covers part of East Auckland around the eponymous suburb of Pakuranga. Other population centres include Farm Cove, Half Moon Bay, Bucklands Beach, parts of Highland Park and parts of Howick.

Map of boundaries at the 2020 and 2023 general elections

The boundaries of the Pakuranga electorate were last adjusted in the 2007 redistribution. Initially, the Representation Commission proposed substantial changes, but after hearing objections mainly about Pakuranga, Manukau East, and Manurewa, the shape of the Pakuranga electorate reverted to almost the boundaries prior to the review. No boundary adjustments were undertaken in the 2013/14 and 2020 redistributions. In the 2025 boundary review, the electorate would gain the outer Auckland suburbs of Cockle Bay and Shelly Park from Botany.

== History ==
Pakuranga was first contested at the 1963 election, and won by future Labour Party frontbencher Bob Tizard. It was captured by National in 1972, and has stayed with National since, save for a brief interlude – the New Zealand Party's presence on the ballot paper in 1984 split the centre-right vote and handed the seat to Social Credit's Neil Morrison.

With the introduction of mixed-member proportional (MMP) representation in 1996 the seat was expanded to absorb most of the neighbouring seat of Howick. Its boundaries have remained largely unchanged since; an attempt in 2007 to resurrect a seat around Howick by pulling the Pakuranga boundaries across the Tamaki River and adding Panmure, Point England and Glen Innes from Auckland City was abandoned in the face of strenuous local objection. Instead, Howick was renamed Botany and centred on the rapid-growth areas of Flat Bush, Botany Downs and Dannemora.

Pakuranga is considered a safe National seat, with Maurice Williamson being easily re-elected at every election to 2014 after ousting Morrison in 1987. In the 2014 election, Williamson had a majority of 12,867 votes over his nearest challenger, Barry Kirker of the Labour Party.

Williamson announced in July 2016 that he would not stand for Parliament at the 2017 general election and the seat was won by Simeon Brown, retaining it for the National Party.

Simeon Brown has confirmed he is standing for the Pakuranga electorate in the 2026 New Zealand general election. Labour has selected Campbell Matthews as their candidate.

=== Members of Parliament ===
Unless otherwise stated, all MPs terms began and ended at a general election.

Key

Labour National Independent Social Credit NZ First

Election	Winner
1963 election	Bob Tizard
1966 election	Bob Tizard
1969 election	Bob Tizard
1972 election	Gavin Downie
1975 election	Gavin Downie
1978 election	Pat Hunt
1981 election	Pat Hunt
1984 election	Neil Morrison
1987 election	Maurice Williamson
1990 election	Maurice Williamson
1993 election	Maurice Williamson
1996 election	Maurice Williamson
1999 election	Maurice Williamson
2002 election	Maurice Williamson
2005 election	Maurice Williamson
2008 election	Maurice Williamson
2011 election	Maurice Williamson
2014 election	Maurice Williamson
2017 election	Simeon Brown
2020 election	Simeon Brown
2023 election	Simeon Brown

=== List MPs ===
Members of Parliament elected from party lists in elections where that person also unsuccessfully contested the Pakuranga electorate. Unless otherwise stated, all MPs terms began and ended at general elections.

Election	Winner
2002 election	Pita Paraone
2005 election	Pita Paraone
2023 election	Parmjeet Parmar

== Election results ==
=== 2026 election ===
The next election will be held on 7 November 2026. Candidates for Pakuranga are listed at Candidates in the 2026 New Zealand general election by electorate § Pakuranga. Official results will be available after 27 November 2026.

=== 2023 election ===
2023 general election: Pakuranga
Notes:	Blue background denotes the winner of the electorate vote. Pink background denotes a candidate elected from their party list. Yellow background denotes an electorate win by a list member, or other incumbent. A ✓ or ✗ denotes status of any incumbent, win or lose respectively.						
Party	Candidate	Votes	%	±%	Party votes	%	±%
National	✓ Simeon Brown	26,105	71.39	+13.53	21,458	58.12	+19.81
Labour	Nerissa Henry	7,395	20.22	−10.69	6,124	16.58	−25.22
ACT	Parmjeet Parmar	1,298	3.54		3,638	9.85	+1.34
NZ Loyal	Phil Scothern	490	1.34		236	0.63	
Animal Justice	Nicholas Hancock	471	1.28		96	0.26	
Rock the Vote NZ	John Alcock	262	0.71				
Green					2,650	7.17	+2.57
NZ First					1,397	3.78	+1.64
Opportunities					531	1.43	+0.51
Te Pāti Māori					184	0.49	+0.30
NewZeal					136	0.36	+0.15
Legalise Cannabis					115	0.31	+0.13
Freedoms NZ					87	0.23	
New Conservative					54	0.14	−1.18
DemocracyNZ					30	0.08	
Women's Rights					27	0.07	
Leighton Baker Party					15	0.04	
New Nation					5	0.01	
Informal votes		544			136		
Total valid votes		36,565			36,919		
Turnout							
National hold	Majority	18,710	51.16	+24.21			

=== 2020 election ===
2020 general election: Pakuranga
Notes:	Blue background denotes the winner of the electorate vote. Pink background denotes a candidate elected from their party list. Yellow background denotes an electorate win by a list member, or other incumbent. A ✓ or ✗ denotes status of any incumbent, win or lose respectively.						
Party	Candidate	Votes	%	±%	Party votes	%	±%
National	✓ Simeon Brown	21,575	57.86	−6.12	14,387	38.31	−23.38
Labour	Nerissa Henry	11,525	30.91	+8.96	15,698	41.80	+17.09
Green	Lawrence Xu-Nan	1,632	4.37	−1.32	1,731	4.60	+0.87
ACT	Mo Yee Poon	790	2.52	—	2,838	8.51	+7.76
New Conservative	Ian Ronald Sampson	426	1.14	—	498	1.32	+1.09
Sustainable NZ	Rachel Dominique Wood	302	0.80	—	34	0.09	—
NZ First					806	2.14	−4.45
Opportunities					347	0.92	−0.29
Advance NZ					193	0.51	+0.43
TEA					175	0.46	—
ONE					81	0.21	—
Māori Party					73	0.19	−0.15
Legalise Cannabis					68	0.18	−0.01
Vision NZ					28	0.07	—
Outdoors					11	0.031	−0.029
Social Credit					4	0.010	+0.008
Heartland					2	0.005	—
Informal votes		882			217		
Total valid votes		37,285			37,552		
National hold	Majority	10,050	26.95	−15.07			

=== 2017 election ===
2017 general election: Pakuranga
Notes:	Blue background denotes the winner of the electorate vote. Pink background denotes a candidate elected from their party list. Yellow background denotes an electorate win by a list member, or other incumbent. A ✓ or ✗ denotes status of any incumbent, win or lose respectively.						
Party	Candidate	Votes	%	±%	Party votes	%	±%
National	Simeon Brown	22,663	63.98	+4.23	22,149	61.69	+1.45
Labour	Barry Kirker	7,777	21.95	−0.09	8,872	24.71	+8.79
NZ First	Suzanne Kelly	2,039	5.75	—	2,369	6.59	−0.50
Green	Guy Hunt	2,018	5.69	—	1,340	3.73	−2.60
Māori Party	Carrie Stoddart-Smith	419	1.18	—	124	0.34	+0.03
Opportunities					436	1.21	—
ACT					272	0.75	−2.20
Conservative					83	0.23	−5.34
Legalise Cannabis					69	0.19	−0.12
People's Party					32	0.08	—
Outdoors					18	0.05	—
United Future					16	0.04	−0.19
Ban 1080					9	0.02	−0.01
Internet					9	0.02	−0.59 (Note: 2017 Internet Party swing is relative to the votes for Internet-Mana in 2014; it shared a party list with Mana Party in the 2014 election)
Mana					6	0.01	−0.61 (Note: 2017 Mana Party swing is relative to the votes for Internet-Mana in 2014; it shared a party list with the Internet Party in the 2014 election)
Democrats					3	0.008	−0.012
Informal votes		506			96		
Total valid votes		35,422			35,903		
National hold	Majority	14,886	42.02	+4.31			

=== 2014 election ===
2014 general election: Pakuranga
Notes:	Blue background denotes the winner of the electorate vote. Pink background denotes a candidate elected from their party list. Yellow background denotes an electorate win by a list member, or other incumbent. A ✓ or ✗ denotes status of any incumbent, win or lose respectively.						
Party	Candidate	Votes	%	±%	Party votes	%	±%
National	✓ Maurice Williamson	20,388	59.75	−6.11	20,854	60.24	−2.56
Labour	Barry Kirker	7,521	22.04	+0.25	5,511	15.92	−2.70
Conservative	Andrew Craig	3,465	10.15	+4.95	1,930	5.57	+2.02
ACT	Jamie Whyte	2,030	5.95	+3.35	1,021	2.95	+1.16
NZ First					2,456	7.09	+1.42
Green					2,192	6.33	+0.12
Internet Mana					214	0.62	+0.50 (Note: 2014 Internet Mana swing is relative to the votes for Mana in 2011; it shared a party list with Internet in the 2014 election.)
Legalise Cannabis					109	0.31	−0.03
Māori Party					108	0.31	−0.02
United Future					78	0.23	−0.23
Civilian					16	0.05	+0.05
Ban 1080					11	0.03	+0.03
Democrats					8	0.02	±0.00
Independent Coalition					8	0.02	+0.02
Focus					4	0.01	+0.01
Informal votes		721			101		
Total valid votes		34,125			34,621		
Turnout		34,621	74.76	+4.77			
National hold	Majority	12,867	37.71	−6.35			

=== 2011 election ===
2011 general election: Pakuranga
Notes:	Blue background denotes the winner of the electorate vote. Pink background denotes a candidate elected from their party list. Yellow background denotes an electorate win by a list member, or other incumbent. A ✓ or ✗ denotes status of any incumbent, win or lose respectively.						
Party	Candidate	Votes	%	±%	Party votes	%	±%
National	✓ Maurice Williamson	20,694	65.86	+4.28	20,471	62.80	+3.10
Labour	Sunny Kaushal	6,848	21.79	+0.17	6,068	18.62	−3.66
Conservative	Lance Gedge	1,634	5.20	+5.20	1,156	3.55	+3.55
NZ First	Helen Jane Mulford	1,430	4.55	+1.26	1,847	5.67	+2.18
ACT	Chris Simmons	816	2.60	−3.74	585	1.79	−5.39
Green					2,024	6.21	+2.61
United Future					149	0.46	−0.50
Legalise Cannabis					112	0.34	+0.12
Māori Party					109	0.33	+0.03
Mana					40	0.12	+0.12
Alliance					20	0.06	+0.02
Libertarianz					9	0.03	−0.01
Democrats					5	0.02	+0.004
Informal votes		1,041			202		
Total valid votes		31,422			32,595		
National hold	Majority	13,846	44.06	+4.10			

Electorate (as at 26 November 2011): 45,912

=== 2008 election ===
2008 general election: Pakuranga
Notes:	Blue background denotes the winner of the electorate vote. Pink background denotes a candidate elected from their party list. Yellow background denotes an electorate win by a list member, or other incumbent. A ✓ or ✗ denotes status of any incumbent, win or lose respectively.						
Party	Candidate	Votes	%	±%	Party votes	%	±%
National	✓ Maurice Williamson	21,430	61.58		21,099	59.70	
Labour	Brian Kelly	7,524	21.62		7,872	22.27	
ACT	Andrew Jollands	2,205	6.34		2,541	7.19	
Green	Zachary Dorner	1,480	4.25		1,273	3.60	
NZ First	Pita Paraone	1,146	3.29		1,231	3.48	
United Future	Quentin Todd	409	1.18		338	0.96	
Progressive	Jeffrey Ly	354	1.02		265	0.75	
Kiwi	Brian Hilder	252	0.72		123	0.35	
Family Party					186	0.53	
Bill and Ben					137	0.39	
Māori Party					106	0.30	
Legalise Cannabis					79	0.22	
Pacific					38	0.11	
Alliance					15	0.04	
Libertarianz					13	0.04	
Workers Party					12	0.03	
RAM					6	0.02	
Democrats					4	0.01	
RONZ					4	0.01	
Informal votes		329			80		
Total valid votes		34,800			35,342		
National hold	Majority	13,906	39.96				

=== 2005 election ===
2005 general election: Pakuranga
Notes:	Blue background denotes the winner of the electorate vote. Pink background denotes a candidate elected from their party list. Yellow background denotes an electorate win by a list member, or other incumbent. A ✓ or ✗ denotes status of any incumbent, win or lose respectively.						
Party	Candidate	Votes	%	±%	Party votes	%	±%
National	✓ Maurice Williamson	19,159	54.03	+10.61	19,173	53.28	+27.26
Labour	Michael Wood	9,577	27.01	–2.29	10,810	30.31	–1.56
Independent	Steve Baron	1,807	5.10	+5.10			
NZ First	Pita Paraone	1,398	3.54	–2.76	2105	5.85	–6.00
ACT	Bronny Jacobson	1,216	3.43	–4.07	1,354	3.76	–10.71
United Future	Ian McInnes	833	2.35	–2.18	878	2.44	–5.44
Progressive	Ly Meng	560	1.58	+0.10	297	0.83	–0.39
Destiny	David Jesze	488	1.38	+1.38	206	0.57	+0.57
Christian Heritage	Ewen McQueen	373	1.05	–1.66	80	0.22	–1.00
Direct Democracy	Kevin Moore	49	0.14	+0.14	11	0.03	+0.03
Green					907	2.52	–1.08
Māori Party					73	0.20	+0.20
Legalise Cannabis					36	0.10	–0.18
Libertarianz					14	0.04	+0.04
Alliance					13	0.04	+0.04
RONZ					7	0.02	+0.02
99 MP					6	0.02	+0.02
One NZ					6	0.02	–0.03
Family Rights					5	0.01	+0.01
Democrats					4	0.01	+0.01
Informal votes		359			88		
Total valid votes		35,460			35,983		
National hold	Majority	9,582	27.02				

=== 2002 election ===
2002 general election: Pakuranga
Notes:	Blue background denotes the winner of the electorate vote. Pink background denotes a candidate elected from their party list. Yellow background denotes an electorate win by a list member, or other incumbent. A ✓ or ✗ denotes status of any incumbent, win or lose respectively.						
Party	Candidate	Votes	%	±%	Party votes	%	±%
National	✓ Maurice Williamson	14,010	43.42		8,470	26.02	
Labour	Michael Wood	9,454	29.30		10,375	31.87	
ACT	Andrew Jollands	2,419	7.50		4,712	14.47	
NZ First	Pita Paraone	2,001	6.20		3,859	11.85	
United Future	Ian McInnes	1,461	4.53		2,543	7.88	
Green	David Rose	1,040	3.22		1,173	3.60	
Christian Heritage	Jonothan Ko	876	2.71		426	1.31	
Progressive	Meng Ly	478	1.48		396	1.22	
Alliance	Paul Protheroe	158	0.49		192	0.58	
ORNZ					204	0.63	
Legalise Cannabis					93	0.28	
One NZ					20	0.06	
NMP					4	0.01	
Mana Māori					0.00		
Informal votes		378			84		
Total valid votes		32,266			32,553		
National hold	Majority	4,556					

=== 1999 election ===
Refer to Candidates in the New Zealand general election 1999 by electorate#Pakuranga for a list of candidates.

=== 1993 election ===
1993 general election: Pakuranga
Party	Candidate	Votes	%	±%
National	Maurice Williamson	9,619	48.01	−16.24
Labour	Heather Mackay	4,159	20.75	
Alliance	Denis Wilkins	3,203	15.98	
NZ First	David Moore	2,399	11.97	
Christian Heritage	John Starrenburg	367	1.83	
McGillicuddy Serious	Sasquatch	201	1.00	
Natural Law	Anne Brigid	87	0.43	
Majority		5,460	27.25	−17.64
Turnout		20,035	84.04	−0.84
Registered electors		23,838		

=== 1990 election ===
1990 general election: Pakuranga
Party	Candidate	Votes	%	±%
National	Maurice Williamson	13,006	64.25	+20.89
Labour	Paul Grant	3,920	19.36	
Green	Peter Whitmore	2,211	10.92	
NewLabour	Sandy Gauntlett	420	2.07	
Democrats	Richard Pittams	312	1.54	
Social Credit	Colin Bernard Nicholls	166	0.82	
McGillicuddy Serious	Greg Pittams	124	0.61	
Blokes Liberation Front	Paul Brunton	50	0.24	
Independent	Elaine Wills	31	0.15	
Majority		9,086	44.89	−35.16
Turnout		20,240	84.88	−5.76
Registered electors		23,843		

=== 1987 election ===
1987 general election: Pakuranga
Party	Candidate	Votes	%	±%
National	Maurice Williamson	8,987	43.36	
Democrats	Neil Morrison	6,969	33.62	−1.85
Labour	Barry Wilson	4,700	22.67	
Independent	Sofia Bogrich	70	0.33	
Majority		2,018	9.73	
Turnout		20,726	90.64	−4.48
Registered electors		22,866		

=== 1984 election ===
1984 general election: Pakuranga
Party	Candidate	Votes	%	±%
Social Credit	Neil Morrison	8,271	35.47	−2.22
National	Pat Hunt	8,099	34.73	−6.19
NZ Party	Jo Grierson	3,804	16.31	
Labour	Gary Williams	3,101	13.30	
Independent	J R Marriott	39	0.16	−0.29
Majority		172	0.73	
Turnout		23,314	95.12	+3.77
Registered electors		24,510		

=== 1981 election ===
1981 general election: Pakuranga
Party	Candidate	Votes	%	±%
National	Pat Hunt	9,908	40.92	+4.42
Social Credit	Neil Morrison	9,125	37.69	+23.71
Labour	Peter Turner	5,066	20.92	
Independent	J R Marriott	110	0.45	
Majority		783	3.23	−6.88
Turnout		24,209	91.35	+15.53
Registered electors		26,501		

=== 1978 election ===
1978 general election: Pakuranga
Party	Candidate	Votes	%	±%
National	Pat Hunt	7,615	36.50	
Labour	Elsa Smith	5,504	26.38	
Independent	Gavin Downie	4,455	21.35	
Social Credit	Neil Morrison	2,918	13.98	+8.79
Values	M H T Walker	269	1.28	
Majority		2,111	10.11	
Turnout		20,861	75.82	−11.58
Registered electors		27,513		

=== 1975 election ===
1975 general election: Pakuranga
Party	Candidate	Votes	%	±%
National	Gavin Downie	14,192	58.23	+6.79
Labour	Geoff Braybrooke	7,176	29.44	
Values	Maurice Jenner	1,349	5.53	
Social Credit	Neil Morrison	1,265	5.19	
Independent	Barry Curtis	356	1.46	
Alpha	Victor Filmer	19	0.07	
World Socialist	Maurice Gribble	12	0.04	
Majority		7,016	28.79	+18.84
Turnout		24,369	87.40	−3.40
Registered electors		27,881		

=== 1972 election ===
1972 general election: Pakuranga
Party	Candidate	Votes	%	±%
National	Gavin Downie	9,310	51.44	
Labour	J B Irwin	7,508	41.48	
Social Credit	B J Southon	1,153	6.37	
New Democratic	F J Collins	126	0.69	
Majority		1,802	9.95	
Turnout		18,097	90.80	+0.66
Registered electors		19,930		

=== 1969 election ===
1969 general election: Pakuranga
Party	Candidate	Votes	%	±%
Labour	Bob Tizard	9,030	51.20	−0.45
National	Noel Holmes	7,777	44.09	
Social Credit	James Robinson	692	3.92	
Independent	E V Posa	80	0.45	
Communist	Rita Smith	40	0.22	
Independent	Joseph Erwin Moosman	17	0.09	−0.30
Majority		1,253	7.10	−5.33
Turnout		17,636	90.14	+4.24
Registered electors		19,563		

=== 1966 election ===
1966 general election: Pakuranga
Party	Candidate	Votes	%	±%
Labour	Bob Tizard	9,380	51.65	−2.27
National	Victor David Thompson	7,121	39.21	
Social Credit	Thomas Rayne Wreaks	1,588	8.74	+4.31
Independent	Joseph Erwin Moosman	71	0.39	
Majority		2,259	12.43	−0.51
Turnout		18,160	85.90	−1.45
Registered electors		21,139		

=== 1963 election ===
1963 general election: Pakuranga
Party	Candidate	Votes	%	±%
Labour	Bob Tizard	8,394	53.92	
National	Roland Mainwaring Neville-White	6,379	40.97	
Social Credit	Thomas Rayne Wreaks	690	4.43	
Communist	Rita Smith	104	0.66	
Majority		2,015	12.94	
Turnout		15,567	87.35	
Registered electors		17,821		
