= Brianna Fruean =

Samoan activist

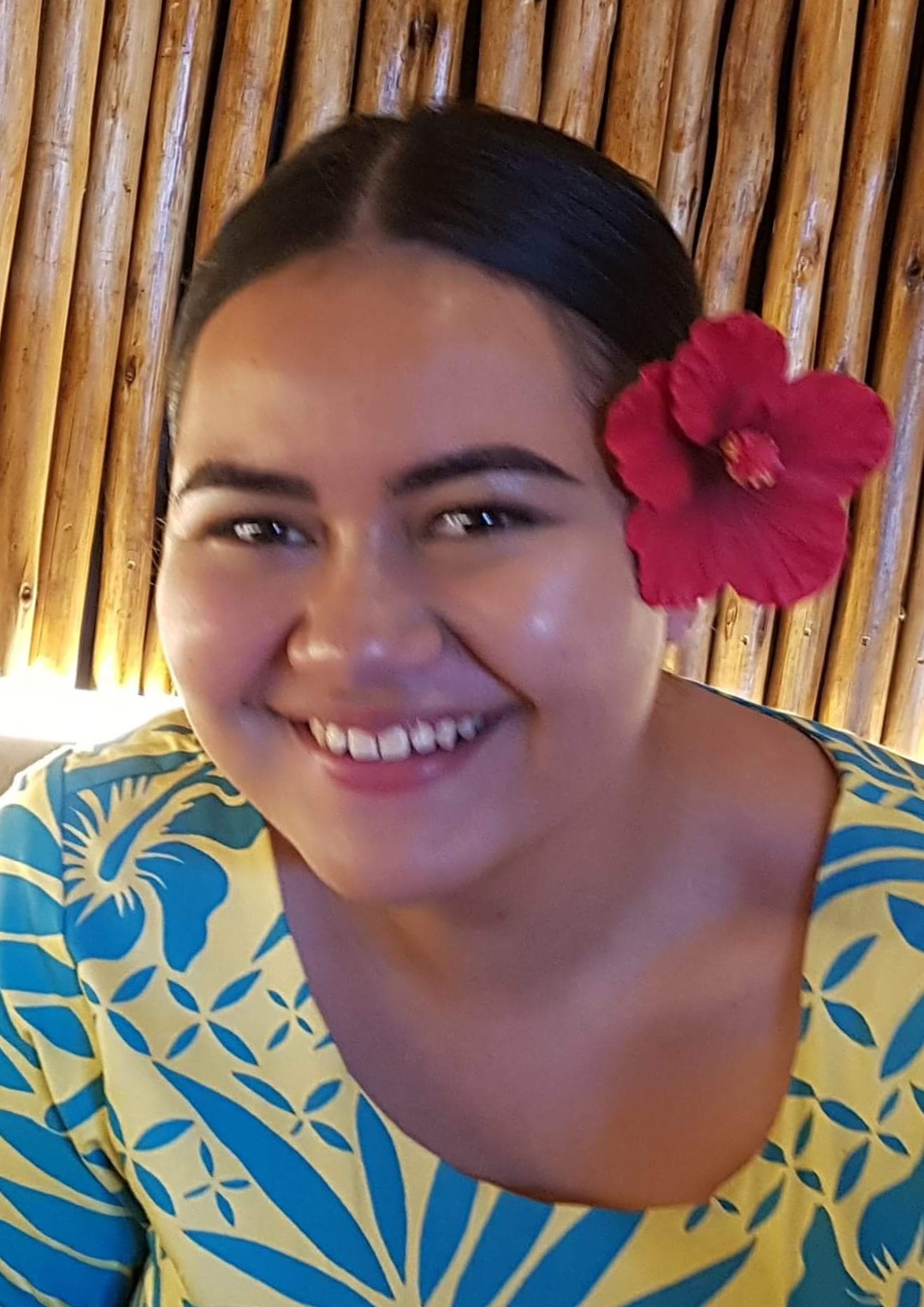
- Brianna Fruean, in 2018

Personal details
- Born: May 18, 1998 (age 27) Auckland, New Zealand
- Profession: Student at University of Auckland and environmental activist

Brianna Fruean (born 18 May 1998) is an activist and environmental advocate for Samoa; She sits on the Council of Elders for the Pacific Climate Warriors and is a Champion for a Fossil Fuel Non-Proliferation Treaty.

== Biography ==
Born in Auckland, New Zealand, she became one of the founding members of 350 Samoa, and leader of environmental group Future Rush at age 11. Future Rush and 350 Samoa do various projects to help fight climate change and promote sustainable development through awareness programs to spread the word around schools and communities in Samoa and the region. In 2011 she organized yet another environmental awareness activity on behalf of Moving Planet Samoa. A walk which attracted more than 100 people in spreading awareness on climate change in Samoa and the world.

She has attended UNEP Children's Conferences in Korea and Japan 2009–2010. She attended the Rio+20 Summit as a Pacific Youth Ambassador and part of the PACMAS Pacific Media team as a Youth Reporter. Her news items and daily blogs were posted on the Samoa Observer. This was a great honor for Brianna as she was one of the youngest people to attend the Rio+20 Summit.

Fruean has done a number of climate change talks throughout her 5 years as a climate change advocate, where she visited schools and taught children and youth (preschool to year 13) about climate change coming from a student their own age and empowering them to be agents of change.

In 2011 in the UN Small Island Developing State conference in Apia, Samoa as an ILO youth representative and a part of the Young Women Christian Association. During the conference she was recognized as a Bright Spot by the Global Island Partnership.

Brianna is always working on different campaigns to compact Climate Change and appeal to kids her age using peer to peer education. When she attends Environmental summits, she speaks about youth perspective and voices her concerns about the impacts of Climate Change; the need for low carbon development while balancing out what Samoa needs to grow as a country and how this impacts the Pacific region and the lives of children.

Brianna was named Pacific Region Commonwealth Youth Award winner at the Commonwealth Youth Awards 2015. At the age of 16, Ms Fruean is the youngest ever recipient of a Commonwealth Youth Award.

Brianna was chosen by SPREP as their first ever Youth Ambassador in recognition of her achievements to conserve the Pacific environment. She is the first recipient under the SPREP Youth Ambassador programme that will further develop and strengthen the voice of young people in the Pacific on the key issues of the environment and climate change. In her first official activity she attended the Regional Resilience to Climate Change and Its Consequences Workshop from 23 to 27 April in New Caledonia.

Brianna was a keynote speaker at the Berlin Energy Transition Dialogue 2021 on 16 March 2021 alongside other notable world leaders. In November 2021 she addressed the 2021 United Nations Climate Change Conference.
