= Pat Hunt =

New Zealand politician (1931–2023)

Member of the New Zealand Parliament for Pakuranga
- In office 25 November 1978 – 14 July 1984
- Preceded by: Gavin Downie
- Succeeded by: Neil Morrison

Personal details
- Born: Thomas de Vere Hunt; 19 January 1931 Auckland, New Zealand
- Died: 24 July 2023 (aged 92) Auckland, New Zealand
- Party: National
- Other political affiliations: ACT
- Education: University of Auckland
- Profession: Electrical engineer

Thomas de Vere Hunt (19 January 1931 – 24 July 2023), generally known as Pat Hunt, was a New Zealand politician of the National Party.

== Biography ==
Thomas de Vere Hunt was born in Auckland on 19 January 1931. He gained his education at Mount Albert Grammar School and the University of Auckland, from where he graduated with a Bachelor of Engineering degree in electrical engineering in 1959.

New Zealand Parliament
Years	Term	Electorate	Party
1978–1981	39th	Pakuranga	National
1981–1984	40th	Pakuranga	National

In 1978, Hunt replaced Gavin Downie as the National candidate for Pakuranga, in a controversial challenge to a sitting MP. Downie stood as an Independent and the previous substantial majority was reduced, but Hunt was elected in 1978. Hunt narrowly held onto the electorate in 1981 when he was challenged by Neil Morrison of the Social Credit Party. Morrison defeated Hunt at the 1984 election.

During the 1984 election campaign, Hunt coined the unflattering term "Skoda brigade and Crimplene suit contingent" for Social Credit supporters. The Skoda company were angered by the remark and it became an epitaph to Hunt who later tried to be selected as a National candidate again, though his attempts were rebuffed. Hunt later joined ACT New Zealand instead where he found himself together with Morrison who had also joined the party. When appearing together at the inaugural ACT conference in 1994, Morrison acknowledged that many Social Creditors liked crimplene and one of his branch members drove a Skoda.

In 1990, Hunt was awarded the New Zealand 1990 Commemoration Medal.

Hunt died in Auckland on 24 July 2023, at the age of 92.

New Zealand Parliament
Preceded by Gavin Downie	Member of Parliament for Pakuranga; 1978–1984	Succeeded by Neil Morrison
