= Neil Morrison =

New Zealand politician

2nd Leader of the Democratic Party
- In office 23 August 1986 – 22 August 1988
- Deputy: Alasdair Thompson
- Preceded by: Bruce Beetham
- Succeeded by: Gary Knapp

Member of the New Zealand Parliament for Pakuranga
- In office 14 July 1984 – 15 August 1987
- Preceded by: Pat Hunt
- Succeeded by: Maurice Williamson

Personal details
- Born: 11 January 1938 Tuakau, New Zealand
- Died: 19 September 2007 (aged 69) Auckland, New Zealand
- Party: Social Credit
- Spouse: Gabrielle Courtis (m. 1959)
- Children: 2
- Occupation: Mechanic

Neil Joseph Morrison (11 January 1938 – 19 September 2007) was a New Zealand politician of the Social Credit Party.

== Early life and career ==
Morrison was born in 1938 at Tuakau. He was a fourth-generation New Zealander and grew up in a farming family. He attended Pukekohe High School and did an apprenticeship in engineering. He subsequently qualified as an A-grade diesel engineer. In 1959 he married his wife Gabrielle Anne Courtis, a doctor's daughter, and had two children. He owned his own garage and worked as a mechanical supervisor at the Tasman Pulp and Paper mill. He later relocated to Auckland where his family took over ownership of two superettes. Morrison was later self-employed in the transport and manufacturing industries before becoming a director of a property development company in Ohakune.

== Political career ==
New Zealand Parliament
Years	Term	Electorate	Party
1984–1985	41st	Pakuranga	Social Credit
1985–1987	Changed allegiance to:		Democrats

Morrison joined the Social Credit Party in the mid-1960s and was its candidate for the seat of Eden in 1972. He then contested the Pakuranga seat at the next three elections before winning it in 1984 election by 172 votes, from two-term MP Pat Hunt (his election night majority was 419). During the 1984 election campaign, Hunt coined the unflattering term "Skoda brigade and Crimplene suit contingent" for Social Credit supporters after losing to Morrison. Gary Knapp retained East Coast Bays, but the party leader Bruce Beetham lost his Rangitikei seat. Soon after being elected he began advocating to change the name of the Social Credit Party to the New Zealand Democratic Party in an effort to rejuvenate following a huge drop in support between the 1981 and 1984 elections.

In 1985 Knapp resigned as deputy leader of the party and Morrison stood to replace him. He was elected over Lower Hutt City Councillor Errol Baird and Thames Borough Councillor Alasdair Thompson for the position. In 1986 Beetham lost the leadership of the party to Morrison. On the night he was elected, the new leader implied in a TV interview that the Social Credit national dividend policy was out of date and would be dropped. This was in response to a question from the interviewer, which he might not have listened to carefully. The next day when Beetham said he was considering resigning because the new leadership was rejecting basic Social Credit philosophy, Morrison publicly retracted his comment and affirmed that the national dividend would remain an important part of Social Credit policy.

In the 1987 election Morrison was defeated by National Party candidate Maurice Williamson, and Knapp was defeated by another National candidate. The next year Morrison resigned as leader and Knapp was elected at the party's 1988 conference as leader. He also ruled out standing in the seat again at the 1990 election.

Morrison later left the Democratic Party in 1989, citing internal disputes within the party between his predecessor and successor as leader as the reason for doing so. Soon after he became a donor to the National Party. By the early 1990s he had joined ACT New Zealand where he found himself together with Hunt who had joined the party too. When appearing together at the inaugural ACT conference in 1994 Morrison acknowledged that many Social Creditors liked crimplene and one of his branch members drove a Skoda.

He was elected as a Manukau City Councillor in 1989. He was the chair of the council's economic development and corporate business committees. Later he focused on disaster planning and was the chair of the Auckland Regional Civil Defence Emergency management group. He was about to run for re-election for a seventh term, when he died from a stroke in 2007. He was survived by his wife and two children.

== Notes ==
New Zealand Parliament
Preceded by Pat Hunt	Member of Parliament for Pakuranga; 1984–1987	Succeeded by Maurice Williamson
Party political offices
Preceded by Bruce Beetham	Leader of the Democratic Party; 1986–1988	Succeeded by Gary Knapp
