= Magnum Photo Supplies Ltd v Viko New Zealand Ltd =

Magnum Photo Supplies Ltd v. Viko New Zealand Ltd
- Court: New Zealand Court of Appeal
- Decided: 22 October 1998
- Citation: [1999] 1 NZLR 395

Court membership
- Judges sitting: Gault J, Blanchard J, McGechan J

Keywords
- accord and satisfaction

The Magnum Photo Supplies Ltd v. Viko New Zealand Ltd [1999] (1 NZLR 395) case was the last of numerous New Zealand cases cited regarding whether or not banking (depositing) a cheque received for part payment was legally accord and satisfaction. In this case, it was the only NZ case not subject to a dispute, that the creditor was successful in being able to claim for the balance from the debtor.

== Background ==
Magnum had supplied Viko with imaging equipment and for reasons not stated, Viko did not pay Magnum, resulting in Magnum taking legal action in the High Court.

Magnum ultimately obtained judgement against Viko for $275,450.95.

Viko unhappy with this ruling, filed an appeal with the court, and soon after wrote the following letter to Magnum's solicitors saying they are confident in winning the appeal, and tendered a cheque for $124,677.18 as a settlement agreement.

"Whilst Viko is confident of its chances of success on appeal, it is clear that both parties face litigation risk. For this reason, Viko is still prepared to resolve this matter on the basis of an agreed settlement. It is prepared to offer Magnum $124,677.18, plus the return of the remaining Imager machines, in full and final settlement of all matters as between the parties. The figure of $124,677.18 is arrived at by adding the costs and disbursements as fixed by the Registrar to half of Magnum's original principal claim. A cheque for $124,677.18 is enclosed with this letter. Presentation of this cheque will constitute acceptance of this offer. Should the offer contained in this facsimile be acceptable to Magnum we look forward o confirmation of that."

Unbelievably, Magnum's solicitors not only banked the cheque in error, but also posted to Viko's lawyers a receipt which they received the following day.

Magnum's lawyers realised the mistake the following day, and contacted Viko's lawyers to notify them of the error, offering to immediately refund the cheque, and even go as far as suggest they cancel the cheque.

"We refer to your letter of 2 December 1997 which was accompanied by a cheque for $124,677.18. As advised to you in our telephone conversation (Bagio/Kelly) we were to obtain instructions from our client in relation to your settlement offer. We attempted to fax your letter to our client but were unable to complete a transmission. Our client has not yet even seen the terms of your letter.

Unfortunately, due in administrative error your cheque was mistakenly banked. We are prepared to forward to you immediately our trust account cheque for the same amount. You may wish to put a stop on the cheque which has been presented. We are currently holding the funds in our trust account on trust for your client and seek your advice as to whether you require the funds to be placed on interest bearing deposit.

The employee involved, who acted without instructions, is prepared to swear an affidavit which will verify this information. Please advise if this affidavit will be required by you. The banking of the cheque was therefore an administrative error which cannot be deemed to be acceptance of your client's offer.

Please contact us urgently with regard to this matter."

Whilst Viko's lawyers recall receiving the receipt that day, by the time Magnum contacted them later that day, they said they had not read it to realise it was a receipt.

== Held ==
The New Zealand Court of Appeal ruled that there was no accord and satisfaction, and accordingly ordered Viko to pay the balance. Whilst Magnum won the case, they were awarded costs of only $5,000, as the grounds for appeal was the result of Magnum's mistake. Also Magnum's previous costs award in the High Court was vacated.
