= Gavin Downie =

New Zealand politician

Gavin Price Ansell Downie (5 December 1924 – 27 January 1998) was a Member of Parliament for Pakuranga in Auckland, New Zealand.

== Early life and career ==
Gavin Downie was born in Auckland, New Zealand, 5 December 1924, not long after his parents, George and Muriel, and sister Joan, arrived by ship, from the U.K. Downie once quipped that he was 'Almost a fish.' He grew up in Remuera, Auckland, attending Mt Albert Grammar school, and studying horticulture. During WW2, he was a member of the RNZAF, serving at the meteorological centre in Wigram. He was married twice, first to Elizabeth Godly, and in 1983 to Susan née Stafford. He had three children with Elizabeth – Sue, Paul and Katherine, and a son, Tom, with Susan.

After the war, Downie studied singing, and went to Australia to join the J.C. Williamson touring company, which performed the Gilbert and Sullivan operas. It was while in Melbourne that he met Elizabeth. They married in Sydney 21 December 1950, shortly after, setting sail for New Zealand, for another season of Gilbert and Sullivan operas, in the main centres. They returned to Auckland where Gavin left the company. On leaving the company, Downie studied at what is now the School of Education, University of Auckland, but then, Auckland Training College, where his daughter Sue also studied. He taught in several Auckland primary schools, but teaching was not really where his heart lay. So he left to set up his own woodworking factory in Puhinui Road, Papatoetoe, which was, in the early '50s, a largely rural community. Downie possessed considerable skills in engineering, woodworking and problem solving. From there, this skill base formed, in the early 1960s, the core of his manufacturing business, GP Displays, where he designed shop interiors and manufactured the fittings for these. In 1960, in a brief return to the stage, Downie was involved with the Auckland Amateur Operatics, in a production of 'Iolanthe'. In this, he played the Lord Chancellor, a role he had always coveted. NZ Herald Critic, L.C. M. Saunders wrote:'Honours to Gavin Downie for a thoroughly hilarious Lord Chancellor.' He then went on to a direct a production of 'Trial by Jury' the following year, where he played the learned Judge, and Elizabeth, and artist, designed the costumes for the bridesmaids.

However it was his love and involvement in politics which dominated his life, in which he and Elizabeth, his staunchest advocate and supporter, became heavily involved. This culminated in his standing for Parliament in the electorate of Pakuranga, in 1972. Upon election to parliament, Downie and his family, moved from their home in Mission Bay, to the suburb of Cockle Bay. Downie served two terms in Parliament, his specialty being health, as he had always been interested in complementary health systems, and fitness, being a keen marathon runner. Downie was instrumental in pushing, in a Private Members Bill, for the establishment of a Small Claims Court. In his final term in Parliament, following a political challenge, Downie stood as an independent against the National Party candidate, in which, despite polling high, Downie lost the election.

Following his parliamentary career, Downie and his wife Elizabeth divorced. (See 'After Parliament) Downie married Sue Stafford in 1983, and went to live in the wooded suburb of Titirangi, a place he had always loved. It was during these years, that Downie studied to be a classical homeopath. He loved his studies, and practiced as a homeopath till his death in 1998. Downie was a loving family man who supported his children in their aspirations: Sue, an artist, Paul, harpsichord and fortepiano builder, and Kate (Katherine)a jeweler. Tom, in common with his siblings, shares his father's love of things musical and theatrical. He had a deep and abiding love of nature, especially for the flora and fauna of New Zealand. He considered the highlight of his Parliamentary career, to have been a trip, as part of his job, to Antarctica, a place which had always fascinated him, probably since his mountaineering days in his teens and early twenties.

== Member of Parliament ==
=== National Party ===
New Zealand Parliament
Years	Term	Electorate	Party
1972–1975	37th	Pakuranga	National
1975–1978	38th	Pakuranga	National
1978	Changed allegiance to:		Independent

Downie represented the Pakuranga electorate from 1972 to 1978 for the National Party. He was the first Member of Parliament to raise the health implications of smoking. He was replaced as the National candidate for Pakuranga by Pat Hunt in a controversial challenge to a sitting MP.

He had previously been challenged for selection in 1974, by Barry Curtis after many local party members became dissatisfied with his performance, though Downie managed to beat off the challenge.

=== Independent ===
Downie reacted to his de-selection by declaring himself an independent in 1978. He then unsuccessfully stood as an independent in the 1978 election.

== After Parliament ==
Gavin Downie & Associates was a training company which Downie ran from 1978 to 1982. He and his second wife then started Telephone Marketing International Ltd, the first telemarketing company in New Zealand. They were instrumental in the setting up of the NZDMA (New Zealand Direct Marketing Association.) Gavin Downie was awarded the Queen's Silver Jubilee Medal for service to the community and the New Zealand 1990 Commemoration Medal for services to New Zealand. A member of the Auckland YMCA, Downie was a keen marathon runner and held the fastest record for the over 60s for several years (3 hours 14 minutes). In his later years he qualified as a classical homoeopath.

Gavin Downie died on 27 January 1998 in Glen Eden, Auckland.

== Notes ==
New Zealand Parliament
Preceded by Bob Tizard	Member of Parliament for Pakuranga; 1972–1978	Succeeded by Pat Hunt
