= Andy Wiren =

New Zealand cricketer

Anders (Andy) Galbraith Wiren (14 November 1911 – 18 September 1998), was a New Zealand cricketer. He was a left-handed batsman who played for Wellington, the city where he was born in. Wiren made two first-class appearances for the team, during the 1945–46 season. In the four innings in which he batted, he scored a total of 100 runs, including an innings-best 84 runs on his debut against Otago.

Wiren's father, also named Anders, played non-first class cricket for Wellington, and stood as an umpire in two first-class matches.

He died in Wellington, New Zealand.
