= Amy Merania Harper =

New Zealand photographer (1900–1998)

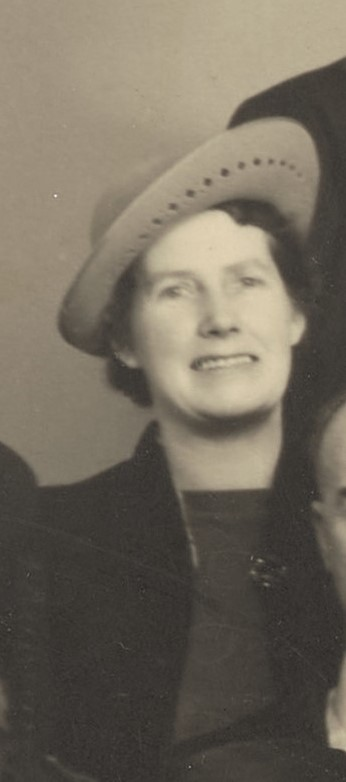
- Employer: Belwood Studios

Amy Merania Harper (1900–1998) was a New Zealand photographer. Harper was the first photographer in Auckland who used fluorescent lighting.

== Biography ==
Amy Merania Harper was born on 23 May 1900 in Paeroa, New Zealand. Harper's was given her first camera, a Thornton Pickard, by her mother in around 1916. Her mother encouraged her photography, organising lessons with Victor R. Millard on photograph retouching. Harper began her career in photography when she was eighteen years old at the studio of H.J Schmidt in Queen St, Auckland. She worked as a retoucher and finisher.She worked at the Schmidt studio for two years, and after leaving worked at retouching and work at home. In 1922, her family purchased JC Morton's Glenmore Studio in central Auckland where Harper became chief photographer, and retained the Glenmore name. In 1928 the family practice expanded further with the purchase of Belwood Studios in Queen St which was later renamed to the Amy Harper Studios. In 1942 she purchased yet another studio, St John Biggs Studio, on Karanghape road which she named Belwood Studios. She opened more Belwood Studios in Ōtāhuhu in 1958 and Papatoetoe in 1969. She became widely known for her formal portraits which captured major life events for her customers. However, she was most well respected for her wedding photography which became a thriving business for her.

In 1945, Harper helped to establish the New Zealand Professional Photographers Association and was subsequently made a life member in 1975. Harper retired in 1979. She died on 15 September 1998 in Glenfield, New Zealand.

== Legacy ==
Harper's collection of work has been exhibited at the Auckland War Memorial Museum in an exhibition titled Reflections; New Zealand Women's Lives Presented Through the Collections of Auckland Museum in 1993. It was also displayed for the public in 1992 at the Auckland City Art Gallery in the 1950s show.

== External sources ==
- Works of Harper are in the collection of Auckland War Memorial Museum Tāmaki Paenga Hira
- Biography of Amy Merania Harper
