= David Lange =

Prime Minister of New Zealand from 1984 to 1989

The Right Honourable David Lange ONZ CH
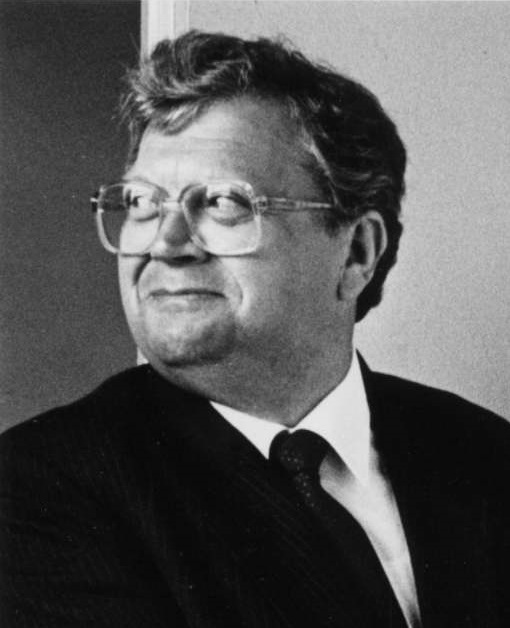
- Lange in the 1980s

32nd Prime Minister of New Zealand
- In office 26 July 1984 – 8 August 1989
- Monarch: Elizabeth II
- Governors-General: David Beattie; Paul Reeves
- Deputy: Geoffrey Palmer
- Preceded by: Robert Muldoon
- Succeeded by: Geoffrey Palmer

27th Attorney-General of New Zealand
- In office 8 August 1989 – 2 November 1990
- Prime Minister: Geoffrey Palmer; Mike Moore
- Preceded by: Geoffrey Palmer
- Succeeded by: Paul East

35th Minister of Education
- In office 24 August 1987 – 8 August 1989
- Prime Minister: Himself
- Preceded by: Russell Marshall
- Succeeded by: Geoffrey Palmer

20th Minister of Foreign Affairs
- In office 26 July 1984 – 24 August 1987
- Prime Minister: Himself
- Preceded by: Warren Cooper
- Succeeded by: Russell Marshall

9th Leader of the New Zealand Labour Party
- In office 3 February 1983 – 8 August 1989
- Deputy: Geoffrey Palmer
- Preceded by: Bill Rowling
- Succeeded by: Geoffrey Palmer

23rd Leader of the Opposition
- In office 3 February 1983 – 26 July 1984
- Prime Minister: Robert Muldoon
- Deputy: Geoffrey Palmer
- Preceded by: Bill Rowling
- Succeeded by: Robert Muldoon

Member of the New Zealand Parliament for Mangere
- In office 26 March 1977 – 12 October 1996
- Preceded by: Colin Moyle
- Succeeded by: Taito Phillip Field

Personal details
- Born: 4 August 1942 Ōtāhuhu, Auckland, New Zealand
- Died: 13 August 2005 (aged 63) Middlemore, Auckland, New Zealand
- Cause of death: Complications from renal failure and diabetes
- Resting place: Waikaraka Cemetery
- Party: Labour
- Spouses: Naomi Joy Crampton (m. 1968; div. 1991) Margaret Pope (m. 1992)
- Children: 4
- Parent(s): Roy Lange; Phoebe Fysh Lange
- Relatives: Peter Lange (brother); Michael Bassett (third cousin)
- Profession: Lawyer, Politician
- Awards: Right Livelihood Award
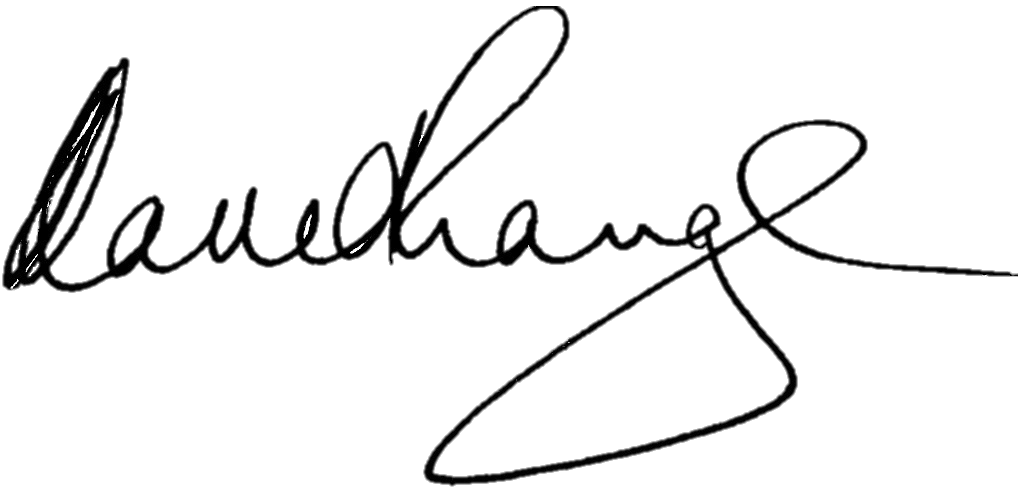
- Signature

David Russell Lange ONZ CH PC (/ˈlɒŋi/ LONG-ee; 4 August 1942 – 13 August 2005) was a New Zealand politician who served as the 32nd prime minister of New Zealand from 1984 to 1989. A member of the New Zealand Labour Party, Lange was also the minister of education and the minister of foreign affairs alongside his term as prime minister. He was also the attorney-general of New Zealand from 1989 to 1990.

Lange was born and brought up in Ōtāhuhu, the son of a physician. He became a lawyer, and represented poor and struggling people in the rapidly changing Auckland of the 1970s. After serving as legal advisor to the Polynesian Panthers, Lange was first elected to the New Zealand Parliament in the Mangere by-election of 1977. He became a prominent debater within parliament, and soon gained a reputation for cutting wit (sometimes directed against himself) and eloquence. Lange became the leader of the Labour Party and leader of the Opposition in 1983, succeeding Bill Rowling.

When Prime Minister Robert Muldoon called an election for July 1984, Lange led his party to a landslide victory, becoming, at the age of 41, New Zealand's youngest prime minister of the 20th century. Lange took various measures to deal with the economic problems he had inherited from the previous government. Some of the measures he took were controversial; the free-market ethos of the Fourth Labour Government did not always conform to traditional expectations of a social-democratic party. He also fulfilled a campaign promise to deny New Zealand's port facilities to nuclear-armed and nuclear-powered vessels, making New Zealand a nuclear-free zone. Lange and his party were re-elected in August 1987; he resigned two years later and was succeeded by his deputy, Geoffrey Palmer. He retired from parliament in 1996, and died in 2005 from renal failure and blood disease at the age of 63. Prime Minister Helen Clark described New Zealand's nuclear-free legislation as his legacy.

== Early life ==
Lange was born on 4 August 1942 in Ōtāhuhu, a small industrial borough since absorbed into Auckland. He was the oldest of four children of Eric Roy Lange, a general practitioner and obstetrician and grandson of a German settler, and Phoebe Fysh Lange, who trained as a nurse in her native Tasmania before she migrated to New Zealand. The family had lived in New Zealand for so long that the original pronunciation of their surname, lan-ge, "had all but been forgotten"; Lange himself would pronounce it as long-ee.

Lange's autobiography suggests that he admired his soft-spoken and dryly humorous father, while his demanding and sometimes overbearing mother tested his tolerance. His cousin Michael Bassett reflected that Roy "knew how to avoid trouble rather than confront it", and David developed a similar aversion to conflict.

Lange received his formal education at Fairburn Road Primary School, Papatoetoe Intermediate School and Otahuhu College, then at the University of Auckland in 1960, where he graduated in law in 1966. He attributed his talents with oratory to the need to compensate for his clumsiness during his intermediate school days.

Lange worked from an early age and held a number of jobs; in the third form, he performed a paper-round for The New Zealand Herald in Mangere East, and later changed from delivery-boy to collecting the money. The following year, he delivered telegrams, before applying to work at the Westfield Freezing Works in the role that would initially pay his way through university. The poor work conditions at the freezing works provided an opportunity to identify with the misery of fellow workers and an appreciation for the impact of strikes on ordinary workers.

In 1961, Lange started a job as a law clerk at Haigh, Charters and Carthy, a role that had varied work and clients, including the Communist Party. On 13 March 1967, Lange was admitted as a barrister and solicitor of the High Court of New Zealand. After his admission, he spent months travelling across Australia, Asia and Britain. On 3 August 1968, he married Naomi Crampton. He gained a Master of Laws in 1970 with first-class honours, specialising in criminal law and medico-legal issues. Lange practised law in Northland and Auckland for some years, often giving legal representation to the most dispossessed members of Auckland society – he assisted the Polynesian Panther Party (and, by extension, the Pacific Island community) to disseminate legal rights information and legal aid during the '70s dawn raids.

In July 1976, Lange was involved in the legal defence of former cabinet minister Phil Amos after he protested the visit of the 20,000-tonne American cruiser USS Long Beach in his small yacht the Dolphin by impeding its entry to Auckland Harbour. The cruiser was forced to stop mid-stream to allow grappling hooks to be thrown to pull the Dolphin clear. Afterwards, Amos had been arrested and charged with obstruction. He was convicted, but the conviction was overturned on appeal by Lange. Amos' protest instantly became a headline-grabbing piece of political drama, bringing public attention to the anti-nuclear issue. Lange was inspired by Amos' stand and, following his example, would later pass a law banning the visit by nuclear-propelled or armed ships to New Zealand.

== Political career ==
New Zealand Parliament
Years	Term	Electorate	Party
1977–1978	38th	Mangere	Labour
1978–1981	39th	Mangere	Labour
1981–1984	40th	Mangere	Labour
1984–1987	41st	Mangere	Labour
1987–1990	42nd	Mangere	Labour
1990–1993	43rd	Mangere	Labour
1993–1996	44th	Mangere	Labour

Lange joined the Labour Party in 1963, and helped in the campaigns of Phil Amos in 1963 and Norman Douglas in 1966. In 1974 his cousin Michael Bassett suggested that Lange should stand on the Labour ticket for the Auckland City Council. The Council was dominated by conservative interests and the only Labour candidates elected were Jim Anderton and Catherine Tizard; Lange was "...halfway down the field .... which was better than I expected." Lange's father, Roy, who was a doctor at Ōtāhuhu, had delivered Bassett. The two would later have strong disagreements, prompting Lange to remark, "My father had delivered him, and it became plain in later days that he must have dropped him."

Lange then stood for Labour in Hobson in 1975, and came third. In 1977, he entered the race for the Labour nomination in a by-election for the safer seat of Mangere. He saw off more experienced candidates (some of whom were former MPs) to win the Labour candidacy. He won the Mangere by-election, retaining the area for Labour.

Lange then represented Mangere, a working-class Auckland electorate with a large Māori population, in the New Zealand Parliament. On becoming an MP, Lange quickly made an impression in the House as a debater, a wit, and the scourge of Prime Minister Robert Muldoon. In his maiden speech, he suggested that New Zealand children had fewer rights than animals received under the Animals Protection Act 1960, and complained of "appalling" rail service from Auckland to Mangere.

After the 1978 election, Lange was elevated to the Shadow Cabinet. In December 1978, Labour leader Bill Rowling appointed Lange Shadow Minister for Social Welfare. On 1 November 1979, Lange, after encouragement from parliamentary friends Roger Douglas and Michael Bassett, challenged Bob Tizard for the deputy leadership. Lange succeeded in the challenge, narrowly defeating Tizard 20 votes to 18. In addition to becoming Deputy Leader of the Opposition, Lange became Shadow Attorney-General, Shadow Minister of Justice and Shadow Minister of Pacific Island Affairs.

In 1980, Lange and a group consisting of Douglas, Bassett, Richard Prebble and Mike Moore tried to remove Rowling as leader of the Labour Party. Following the coup attempt, Lange resigned as deputy leader in January 1981 to offer himself for re-election as a vote of confidence. At Labour's first caucus meeting of the year, he was re-elected as deputy leader. After Labour lost the 1981 general election, the group, later known as the "Fish and Chip Brigade" (in reference to a picture published at the time showing the plotters eating fish and chips) succeeded in their second attempt in 1983.

=== Leader of the Opposition ===
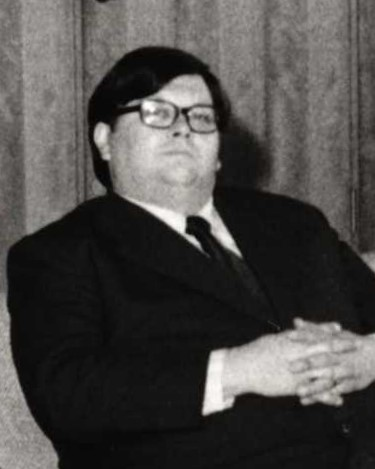
Lange in 1980

Lange succeeded Rowling as parliamentary leader of the Labour Party and as Leader of the Opposition on 3 February 1983. Significant debate emerged within the Labour Party on the party's economic direction, following a paper by Roger Douglas to the party's policy council. Eventually, a compromise was drafted by Geoffrey Palmer, which Lange described as "A manifesto which appealed to the right, the left, the centre and the totally bewildered. It was, in fact, anodyne."

Muldoon unexpectedly called a snap election in 1984, as a result of Marilyn Waring voting for a member's bill introduced by Richard Prebble to introduce a nuclear-free zone. The timing of the election prevented Labour from creating a proper election platform, instead using the Palmer draft. Lange commented that the party went into the election with an unfinished argument for an economic policy.

Lange led Labour to a landslide victory, helped by vote splitting between the National Party and the New Zealand Party. However, before Lange was sworn in as prime minister, a foreign exchange crisis arose, which led to a constitutional crisis. The New Zealand dollar was overvalued, and following the announcement of the snap election in June, traders started selling off the New Zealand dollar on the assumption that Labour would win the election and devalue the currency.

Muldoon refused to follow Lange's instruction to devalue the currency, making the dollar's situation more untenable. Eventually, on 19 July, Muldoon relented, after his position as leader of the National Party was threatened by members of his caucus.

== Prime Minister (1984–1989) ==
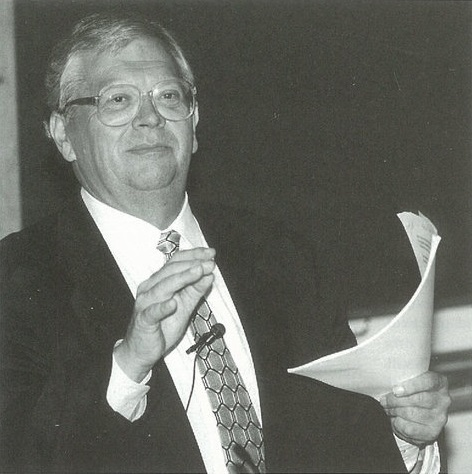
- Premiership of David Lange; 26 July 1984 – 8 August 1989
- Monarch: Elizabeth II
- Cabinet: Fourth Labour Government of New Zealand
- Party: New Zealand Labour Party
- Election: 1984, 1987
- Appointed by: David Beattie

David Lange was sworn in as New Zealand's 32nd Prime Minister on 26 July 1984, becoming, at the age of 41, New Zealand's youngest prime minister of the 20th century, a record later surpassed by only one other, Mike Moore in 1990.

=== First term: 1984–1987 ===
During his first term of office as prime minister, Lange also held the position of minister of foreign affairs.

==== Rogernomics ====
The currency crisis and devaluation of the New Zealand dollar spurred on the reform drive of Roger Douglas, who Lange made minister of finance in the new government. These reforms were soon dubbed 'Rogernomics', in a similar vein to Reaganomics.

Upon coming to office, Lange's government was confronted by a severe balance of payments crisis, as a result of the deficits fuelled by Muldoon's imposition of a two-year freeze on wages and prices, and stubborn maintenance of an unsustainable exchange rate. Such economic conditions prompted Lange to remark: "We ended up being run very similarly to a Polish shipyard". Their first move was to hold an Economic Summit on 14 September 1984, similar to the one held in Australia by Bob Hawke the previous year, to create a feeling of consensus and to lay out the underlying problems in New Zealand's economy. The summit however was dominated by advocacy of radical economic reforms similar to what had been proposed by the Treasury Department, foreshadowing the Lange government's propensity to approach issues from a fundamentally economic standpoint. Margaret Wilson, the Labour Party's president, was deliberately not invited to the summit, a sign of the speed and intolerant approach to opposition that would characterise Rogernomics. Douglas himself saw the summit as a theatrical preparation for his first budget.

Lange and Douglas engaged in a rapid programme of deregulation and the removal of tariffs and subsidies. The first sector affected was New Zealand's agricultural community, a traditionally National-supporting community. The loss of subsidies hit some farmers hard. Other changes brought criticism from many people in Labour's traditional supporter base. The Labour Party also lost support from many elderly people by introducing a superannuation surcharge after having promised not to reduce superannuation.

Douglas also deregulated the financial markets, removing restrictions on interest rates, lending and foreign exchange. In March 1985, with Lange's blessing, the New Zealand dollar was floated. From 1 April 1987, several government departments were corporatised into state-owned enterprises, with massive loss of jobs.

On the role of Government, Lange said, "It is there to be the securer of its citizens' welfare. Where the market works well, it should be given its head. Where the market results in manifest inequity or poor economic performance, the Government must get involved."

==== International affairs and nuclear-free policy ====
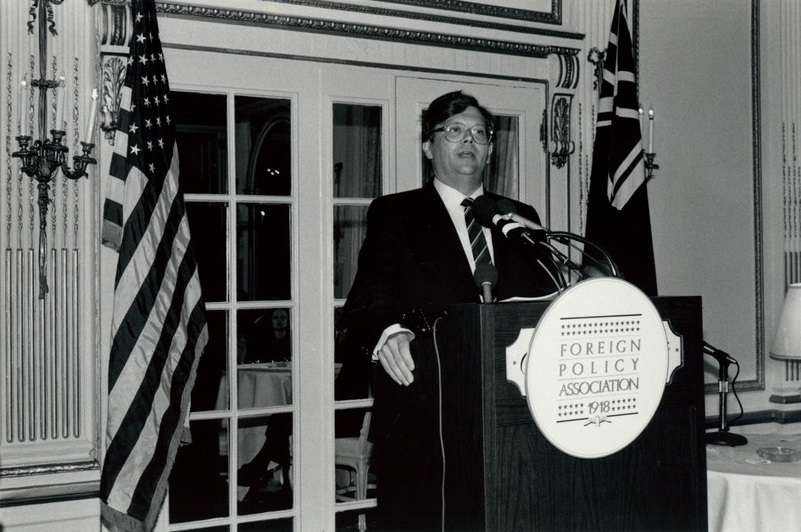
Lange addresses the Foreign Policy Association in New York City, 1984. His stand against nuclear weapons attracted international attention.

Lange made his name on the international stage with his steadfast leadership in the anti-nuclear weapons movement. His government refused to allow nuclear-capable ships into New Zealand's territorial waters, a policy the country continues to this day. In February 1985, Lange famously rejected the arrival of the USS Buchanan, supported by a recommendation from the acting prime minister Geoffrey Palmer. The ship was not armed with nuclear weapons but was capable of carrying them. This displeased the United States; in response, all intelligence flow to New Zealand was stopped and joint military exercises were cancelled. In 1985, there were 22 programmed exercises cancelled or restructured, resulting in approximately 6,000 man-days of training being taken away.

External audio
- Oxford Union debate on nuclear weapons (David Lange at the Oxford Union debate, 1 March 1985), from NZHistory

During a televised Oxford Union debate in March 1985, Lange gained an extraordinary international reputation. Lange argued for the proposition that "Nuclear weapons are morally indefensible", in opposition to the American televangelist Jerry Falwell. Lange regarded his appearance at the Oxford Union as the high point of his career in politics. His speech included the memorable statement:

"There is no humanity in the logic which holds that my country must be obliged to play host to nuclear weapons because others in the West are playing host to nuclear weapons. That is the logic which refuses to admit that there is any alternative to nuclear weapons, when plainly there is. It is self defeating logic, just as the weapons themselves are self defeating, to compel an ally to accept nuclear weapons against the wishes of that ally is to take the moral position of totalitarianism which allows for no self determination."

His speech also included an often-quoted statement made in response to a question posed by another debater:

"...I'm going to give it to you if you hold your breath just for a moment ... I can smell the uranium on it as you lean towards me!"

In 1987, Lange's government passed the New Zealand Nuclear Free Zone, Disarmament, and Arms Control Act 1987. This Act effectively declared New Zealand a nuclear-free zone and banned all nuclear-capable ships from entering New Zealand waters. The United States regarded this legislation as a breach of treaty obligations under ANZUS and announced that it would suspend its treaty obligations to New Zealand until the re-admission of U.S. Navy ships to New Zealand ports, characterising New Zealand as "a friend, but not an ally".

==== Rainbow Warrior affair ====
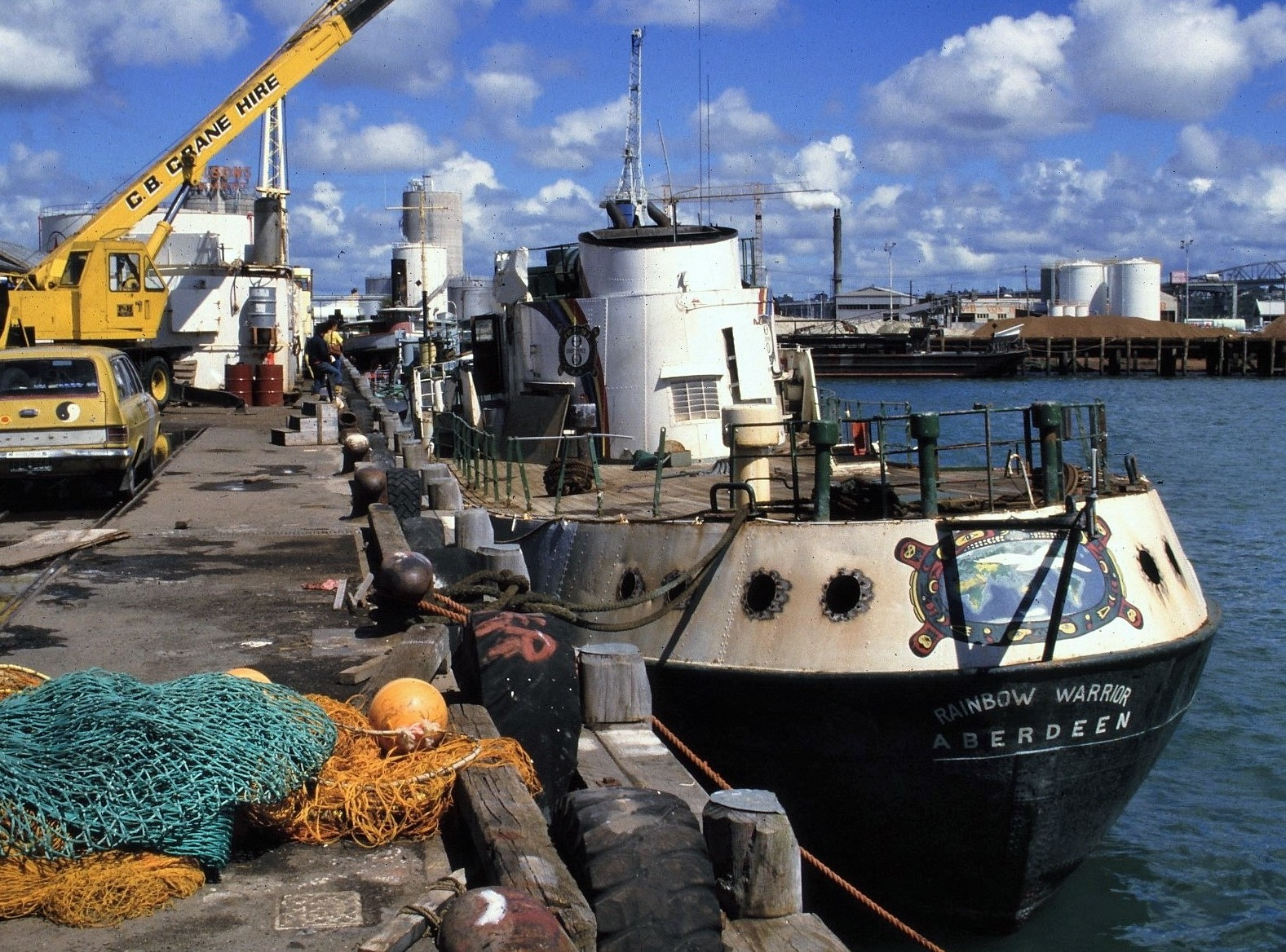
Rainbow Warrior in Auckland, 1985

Relations with France became strained when French agents of the DGSE bombed and sank the Greenpeace ship the Rainbow Warrior on 10 July 1985 while it lay moored in Auckland Harbour, killing photographer Fernando Pereira. In June 1986, Lange obtained a political deal with France over the Rainbow Warrior affair, presided over by United Nations Secretary-General Javier Pérez de Cuéllar. France agreed to pay compensation of NZ$13 million (US$6.5 million) to New Zealand and also to apologise. In return, Lange agreed that French authorities could detain the convicted French agents Alain Mafart and Dominique Prieur at the French military base on Hao Atoll for three years. However, both spies were freed by May 1988, less than two years later, in violation of the agreement.

==== Social reforms ====
During Lange's first term in office, the Lange government implemented many social reforms. On 8 August 1986, the Lange government enacted the Homosexual Law Reform Act, which legalised consensual sex of males 16 years and older and allowed them to enter into sexual relationships with one another without the fear of being prosecuted. On 1 August 1987, the Māori Language Act 1987 was enacted making te reo Māori an official language of New Zealand.

==== 1987 general election ====
Lange's government was re-elected at the August 1987 general election, the first time a Labour government had won a second term since 1938. The government increased its share of the popular vote, although this may have been due to less vote splitting. Lange toured the country throughout the campaign and faced, for the first time, protests against his government, especially in provincial areas. Unusually, Labour did not produce a manifesto for the election, primarily due to disagreement between Douglas and Lange over the direction the government would take if re-elected. Lange sought to focus on social services in the second term, and declared in his victory speech, "I'm proud that we are now, in the next three years, going to seal those [economic] gains, in health and education and social welfare progress."

On the night, Labour's candidate Judith Tizard came within 406 votes of winning the traditionally National-held seat of Remuera; she had been forecast as the winner by initial vote counting. Labour had never come remotely close to winning the wealthy east Auckland seat before, even at its high-tide victories in 1972 and 1984. Tizard's near-win fuelled Lange's misgivings about the direction his government was taking. He commented, "That election night was a great revelation for me. That was an apprehension on my part that we had actually abandoned our constituency. And it set me to think what on earth have we done that we come within 400 votes of winning the true-blue [National] seat of Remuera. And that struck me as being a dangerous flirtation, and an act of treachery to the people we were born to represent."

=== Second term: 1987–1989 ===
Following the 1987 election, Lange made himself Minister of Education. He stated that he gave himself the portfolio to "draw a line in the sand" against the influence of the "Treasury troika" (Douglas, Prebble and David Caygill), and in accordance with his wishes to emphasise social policy in his second term.

==== Fijian coups d'état ====
Lange was criticised for his reaction to the coups d'état in Fiji in May and September 1987. Later, in his autobiography, Lange stated:

There was never any question that New Zealand might use force to restore the democratically elected government, since we were not asked to intervene by its representatives and had we been, we did not have the military resources. I did however ask our military leaders to ready themselves to come to the assistance of any New Zealand citizens who might be endangered, and I met with considerable obstruction.

==== Stock market crash ====
The stock market crash of 19/20 October 1987 damaged confidence in the New Zealand economy, which went into a prolonged recession from December of that year, and remained so until June 1991. During that time, unemployment skyrocketed 170%, and the unemployment rate rose from 4.2% in the September 1987 quarter to 7.5% in the June 1989 quarter. Lange noted with bitterness that Douglas took advantage of the crash to "rubbish" his stated ambitions to have the government focus on social policy and push for more economic reforms.

==== Tomorrow's Schools ====
As Minister of Education, Lange pushed the introduction of Tomorrow's Schools, a radical restructure of New Zealand's primary and secondary school education system. The Department of Education was downsized to become the Ministry of Education and have a supervisory role, education boards were abolished and parents at each school elected their own boards of trustees.

The reforms were criticised for the influence of New Right ideas and their effect of introducing market mechanisms and notions of competition in the education system. Lange's appointment of businessman Brian Picot to head a task force into educational reform was taken as a sign of the government giving too much priority to economic and competitive concerns over the social aspect of education.

==== Leadership challenge and resignation ====
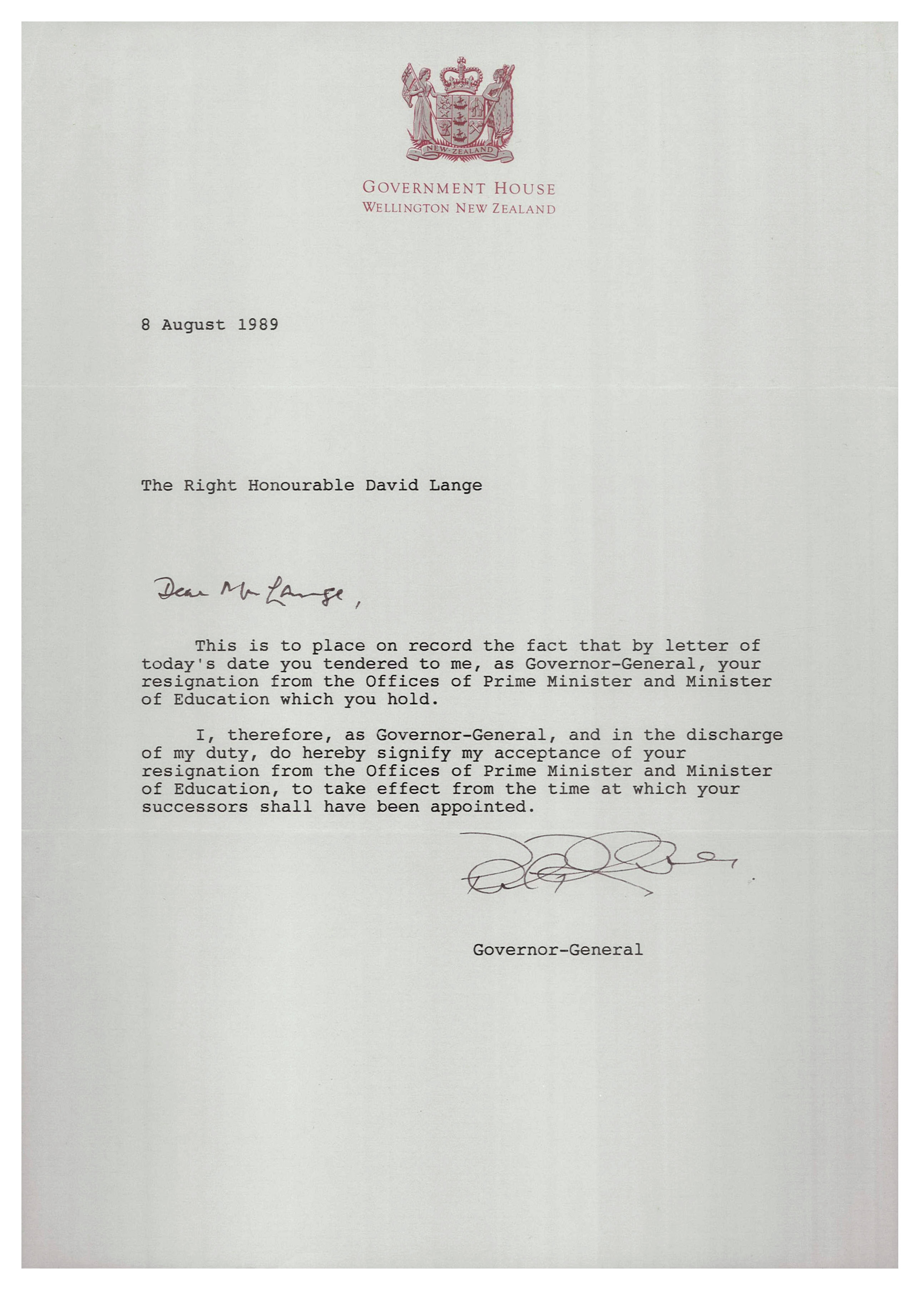
The governor-general's letter accepting Lange's resignation

In 1988, consensus on economic policy amongst the Labour leadership finally broke down, with Douglas resigning after Lange overruled his radical flat income-tax and universal basic income proposal. Douglas continued his campaign against Lange through public statements, the unauthorised release of cabinet papers and on 21 December 1988 an unsuccessful challenge against Lange's leadership in the Labour caucus. Until the August 2026 challenge against Christopher Luxon, it was the only instance when a sitting prime minister had been challenged for leadership.

The radical economic reforms had alienated much of the Labour Party, and it fractured; in April 1989, Jim Anderton, a backbench MP, formed a breakaway NewLabour Party, taking approximately one third of Labour's membership.

However, the caucus re-elected Douglas to the Cabinet on 3 August 1989, and Lange interpreted this as a vote of no-confidence in his leadership. He tendered his resignation five days later on 8 August 1989. Lange became the first elected Labour prime minister who neither died in office nor was voted out in an election.

==== Leadership ====
Lange's leadership abilities were mixed and at times contradictory. As one of the most media-capable New Zealand prime ministers, he was a quick-witted orator and able to speak inspirationally on topics, yet was sensitive to criticism and averse to conflict. He often became caught up in how he was seen to perform and would often avoid confronting angry ministers by using a rear entrance. Despite being media-savvy, Lange's political skills were judged to be poor by political scientist Stephen Levine.

== Motor racing ==
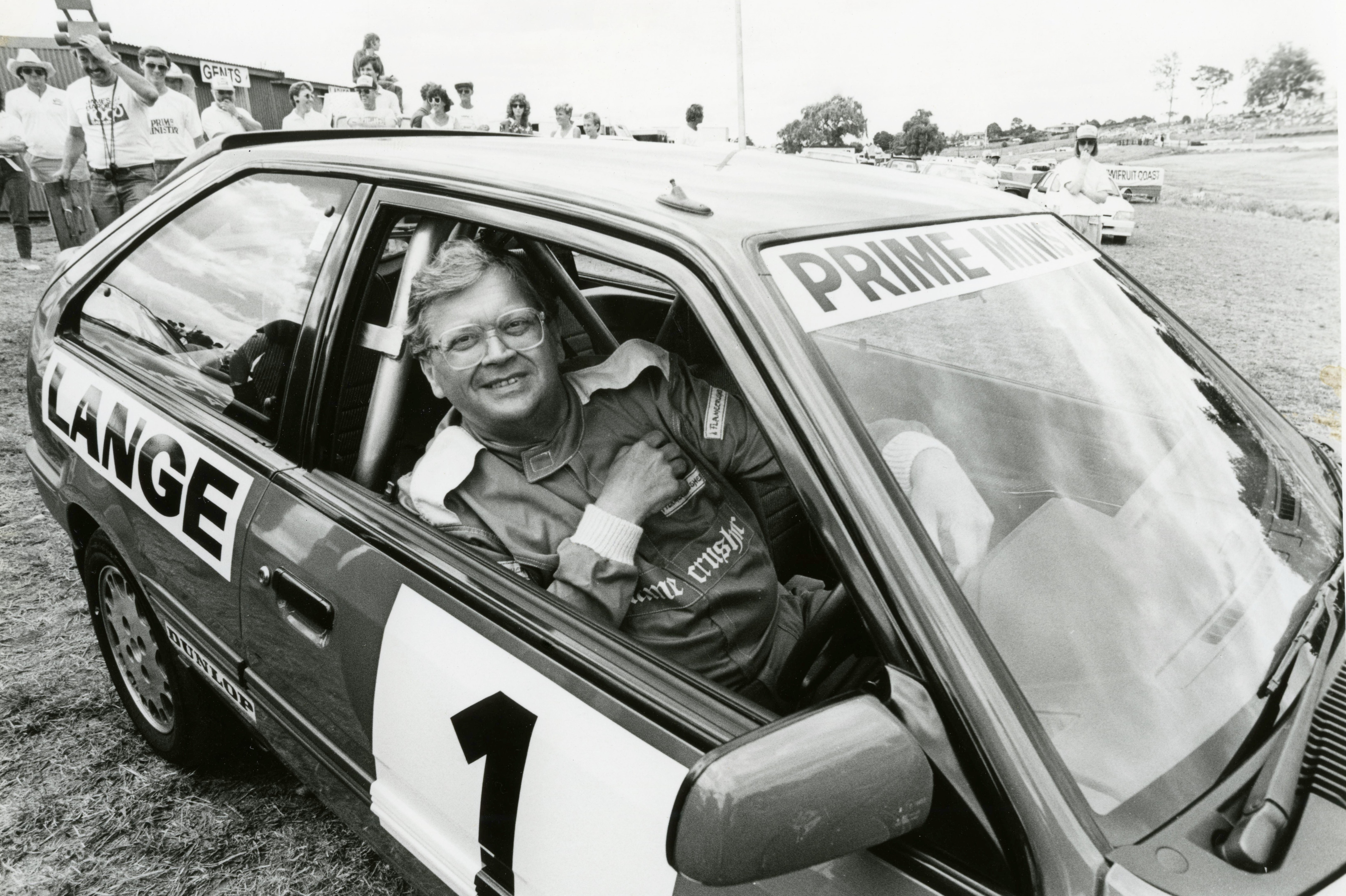
Lange partaking in a motor race

During his tenure as prime minister, Lange engaged in competitive motor racing, appearing in the New Zealand One Make Ford Laser Sport series.

== Post-premiership ==
=== Cabinet minister: 1989–1990 ===
Geoffrey Palmer succeeded Lange as Labour Party leader and prime minister in 1989. Lange became attorney-general, minister in charge of the Serious Fraud Office and a minister of state. Palmer was then replaced by Mike Moore as prime minister shortly before the 1990 general election in November, which Labour lost by a landslide. Lange was re-elected at this election (and again in 1993) as the member for Mangere.

=== Opposition and resignation from parliament ===
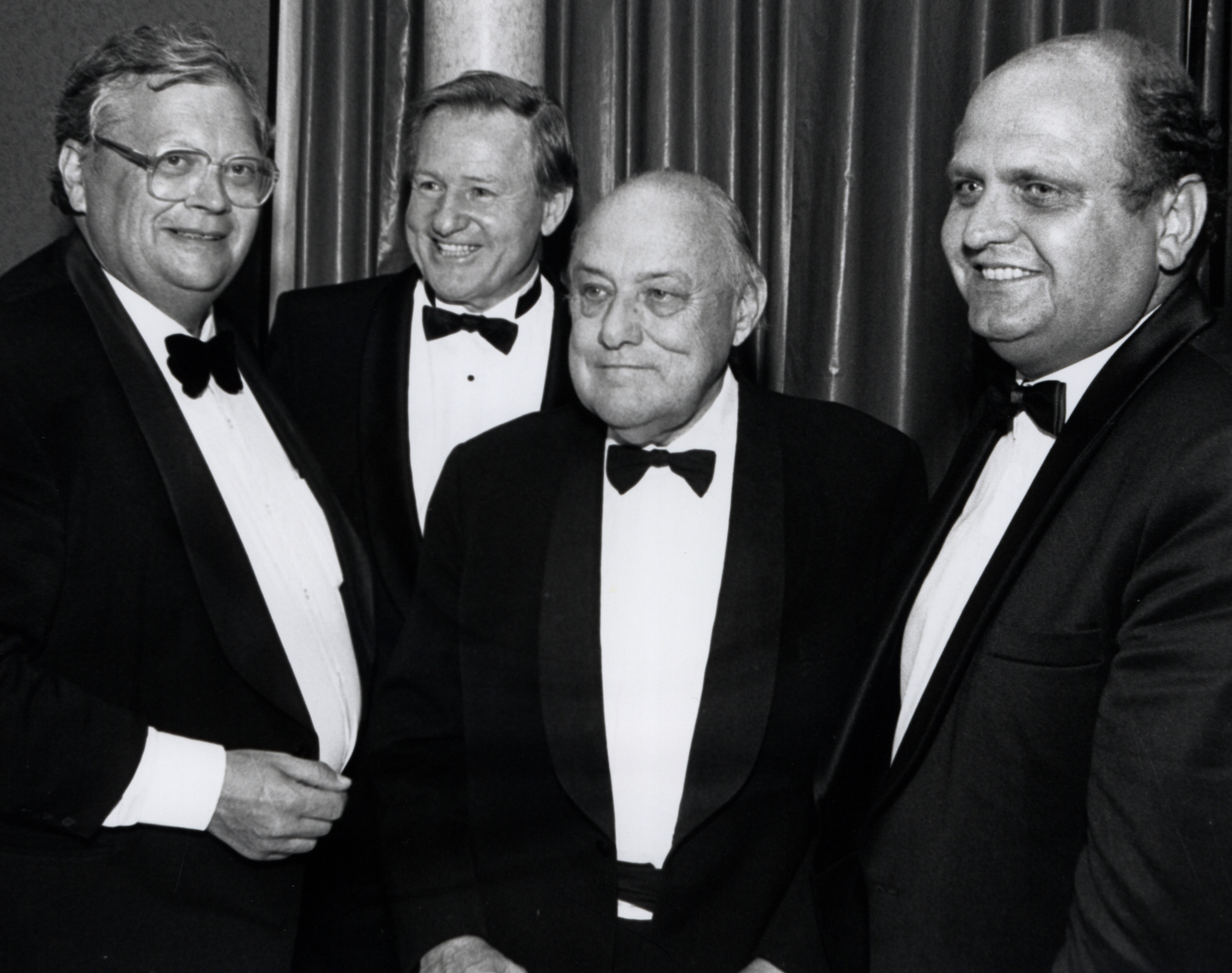
Lange with Jim Bolger, Sir Robert Muldoon and Mike Moore, at the 1992 valedictory dinner, Wellington Club

After the government was defeated in 1990, he was appointed Shadow Attorney-General by Moore. After Moore led Labour to narrow loss in the 1993 general election, Lange backed deputy leader Helen Clark for the leadership against Moore. Clark replaced Moore as Labour leader and made Lange Shadow Minister of Foreign Affairs and Shadow Minister of Racing. In 1991 and 1992 he wrote a Monday column in The Dominion, published alternately with Simon Upton who, Lange commented, "writes erudite obfuscation tempered by occasional attempts to explain the arcana of the health reforms."

Lange was a supporter of changing New Zealand's flag, and wrote in 1994: "[a] stranger who saw the Australian flag and the New Zealand flag outside adjacent buildings would assume that some British hotel chain was advertising deluxe and standard rooms". Lange also expressed support for a New Zealand republic, stating: "Do such things matter? They certainly do. We suffer in this country from a lack of emotional focus... New Zealand will become a republic just as Britain will be blurred into Europe".

In failing health, Lange retired from Parliament before the 1996 general election. In his valedictory speech, he reflected on the pain caused by his government's economic reforms: "I want to thank those people whose lives were wrecked by us. They had been taught for years they had the right to an endless treadmill of prosperity and assurance, and we did them. People over 60 hate me. They hate me because I was the symbol of what caused that assurance of support and security to be shattered. That is something that has always been part of my burden." His Labour Party colleague Taito Phillip Field succeeded him as the member for the Mangere electorate.

=== Life after politics ===
Lange was a New Zealand Rugby League board member and served as the organisation's vice-president.

In an interview with The New Zealand Herald (published on 3 July 2004) the reporter asked Lange:

Do you think if the election of 1984 had not been a snap election, there would have been time for the opposing forces within the party to have successfully blocked the reforms or to have severely limited them?

Lange replied:

"You have to talk about why things happened the way they did. You can't actually explain my political life except by a series of situations rather than by some carefully constructed, rigidly progressed ascendancy. You could not imagine two more unlike rides to the top as I had and Helen Clark had: hers the principled, extremely hard-working, fearless really persistence in the face of all sorts of adversities and personal assaults. Whereas mine was some sort of divine roulette. Even entering into Parliament was not one of your created, structured planned-for episodes. I mean one minute I was a clapped-out two guinea legal-aid lawyer and the next minute I was in Parliament. The by-election of 77 saw to that ... I got there in terms of the Labour Party for all the wrong reasons, for all the reasons which weren't part of its tradition. I'd never been a tract writer; I'd never been a philosopher; I'd never taken part in extraordinary industrial dispute activism; I'd not been in any of that background, but I was able to mix it in what had become, conceived to be, the new front line of politics — the ability on television to convey confidence and assurance without saying anything. And that is very important...."

"[I was] plunged into this extraordinary awareness of a crisis in foreign exchange and reserves and having to take steps that were the absolute antithesis of anything that I would ever have expected the week before. If the people of New Zealand thought it was a bit odd, for me it was absolutely staggering.... I had thought of getting the agencies like the IMF, the World Bank to come in and do a de facto receivership. In fact I said so more or less publicly — let us get some external analysis of where we are rather than one which is tainted by my self-interest and by Muldoon's clear self-interest. But it was rendered unnecessary. He put on such an extraordinarily good performance of carrying on and saying I was introducing scorched earth policy. By the time Muldoon had finish[ed] a couple of television appearances, the general public was completely satisfied we were in a mess...."

==== Litigation ====
In 1996, Lange sued the Australian Broadcasting Corporation over an alleged defamation that it broadcast about him. The ABC used the defence that there exists in the Australian Constitution an implied right to freedom of speech on political matters, but the High Court of Australia found against them, reversing the then existing law (see Lange v Australian Broadcasting Corporation). The case was later settled on terms favourable to Lange.

In a key New Zealand defamation case (Lange v Atkinson [2000] 3 NZLR 385), Lange sued political scientist Joe Atkinson for representing him in the magazine North & South as a lazy prime minister. In a 1998 judgment, and on appeal in 2000, the courts affirmed a new qualified privilege for the media to discuss politicians when expressing criticisms as the "honest belief" of the author.

==== Accidental release of secret report ====
In January 2006, Archives New Zealand released to the Sunday Star-Times newspaper a box of David Lange's previously classified documents. They revealed New Zealand's ongoing involvement in Western alliance espionage, and a threat by the United States to spy on New Zealand if it did not back down from its ban on nuclear ships. Archives New Zealand chief executive Dianne Macaskill said the paper did not have the authority to access or print the report, and wrote to the paper revoking permission to publish it. In response, the Sunday Star Times said the information had already been released into the public arena and hence could not be retracted. The release of the document prompted a high-level inquiry to investigate how the top-secret report ended up in Lange's personal papers, in breach of security protocol. A secret diplomatic cable leaked in 2010 covers the accidental release of the document.

== Personal life ==
Lange was raised in a Methodist family. In the 1960s he worked alongside Methodist theologian Donald Soper at the West London Methodist Mission in England. He was deeply influenced by Soper's interpretation of Christian socialism. Lange later became a Methodist lay preacher.

In 1989, Lange announced in a brief press statement on 10 November that he was separating from his wife of 21 years. On 12 November, Naomi Lange named his speech-writer, Margaret Pope, as "the other woman" in a Sunday Times article, and said that she had been told by her husband five or six months beforehand that he planned to leave the marriage. Lange's mother, Phoebe, also publicly criticised him, but they later reconciled. He had three children, Roy, Emily, and Byron, with his first wife Naomi, and one daughter, Edith, with his second wife Margaret. Lange married Margaret in Glasgow on 12 January 1992 while holidaying in Britain.

Lange's brother Peter is a widely respected New Zealand potter. He has won numerous arts awards and has exhibited widely in New Zealand and overseas. Lange's third cousin Michael Bassett became a fellow Cabinet-minister. Bassett published a book in 2008 about the Lange government entitled Working With David: Inside the Lange Cabinet.

=== Health issues and death ===
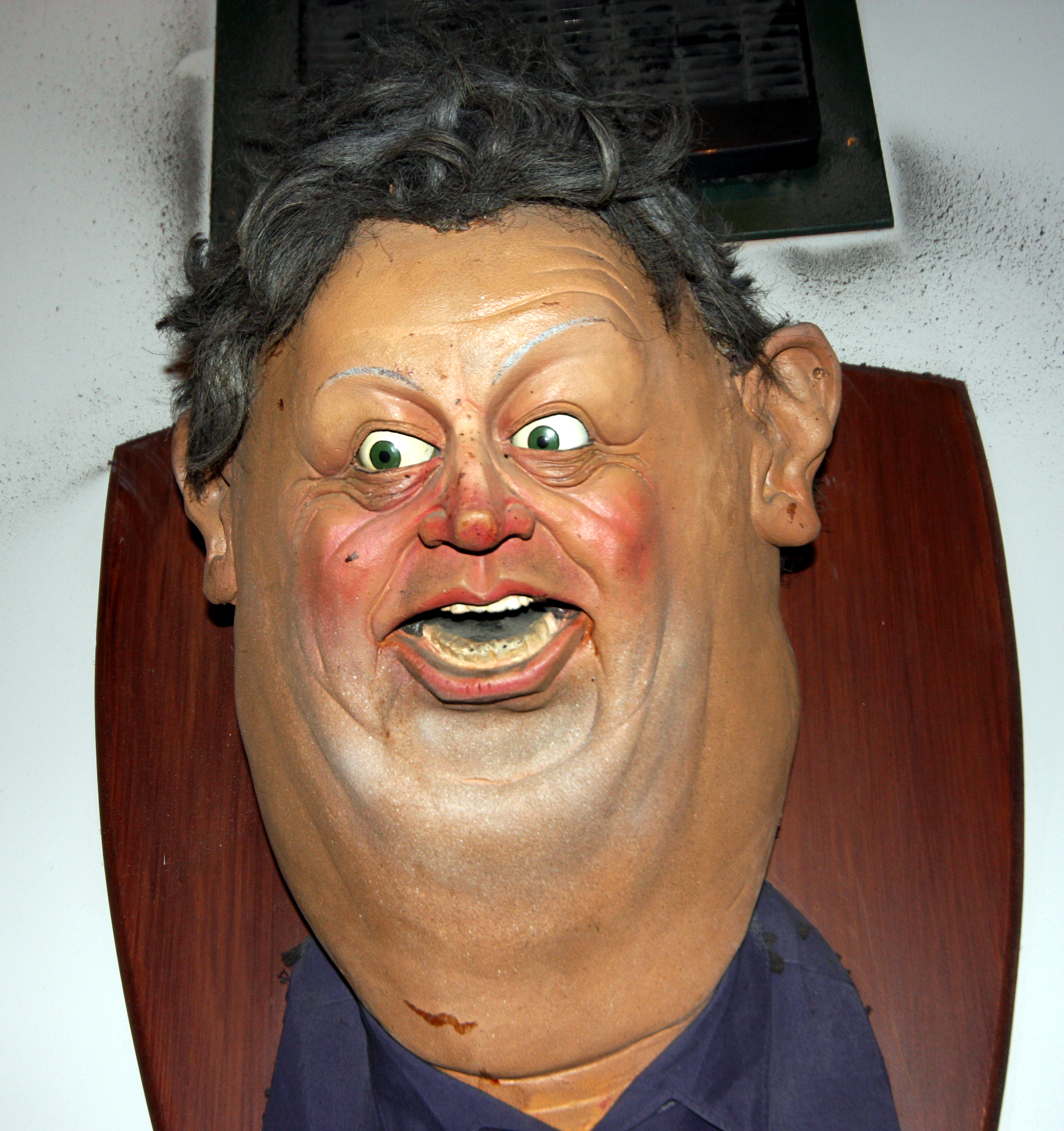
A caricature sculpture of Lange highlighting his weight

Lange suffered all his life from obesity and the health problems it caused. By 1982, he weighed about 175 kilograms (27.6 stone; 386 pounds), and had surgery to staple his stomach in order to lose weight.

In the 1990s, Lange's health declined, with diabetes and kidney disorders. In 2002, doctors diagnosed Lange as having amyloidosis, a rare and incurable blood plasma disorder. He underwent extensive medical treatment for this condition. Although initially told he had only four months to live, Lange defied his doctors' expectations and remained "optimistic" about his health. He entered the hospital in Auckland in mid-July 2005 to undergo nightly peritoneal dialysis in his battle with end-stage kidney failure. On 2 August, he had his lower right leg amputated without a general anaesthetic, as a result of diabetes complications. It was reported that, during the 40-minute operation, a semi-conscious Lange jokingly asked the surgeon: "Have you got the right leg?"

Lange's declining health resulted in the bringing-forward of the publication of his memoir My Life to 8 August 2005. TV3 broadcast on Campbell Live on the same day an interview; John Campbell had interviewed him just before he went into hospital. In his last interview, given to the Herald on Sunday from his hospital bed, he made a potent intervention in New Zealand's 2005 election campaign by saying he "wanted to get out of bed and get a wheel-chair to Wellington" to stop any relaxation of his ban on nuclear ships.

Lange died of complications associated with his renal failure and blood disease in Middlemore Hospital in Auckland on 13 August 2005, just five days after the publication and interview, and nine days after his 63rd birthday. He is buried at Waikaraka Cemetery and the headstone has the simple inscription "David Lange 1942 ~ 2005".

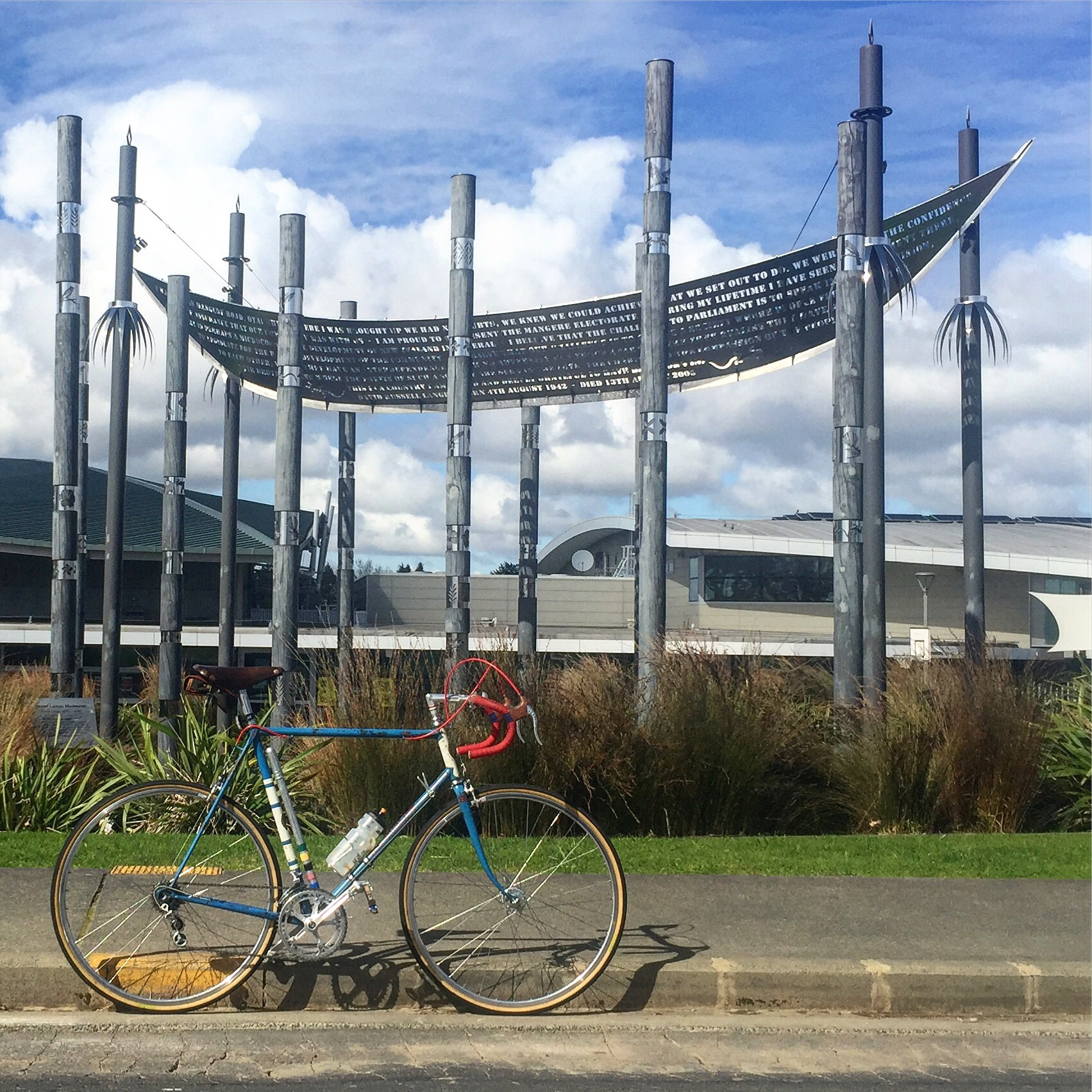
The David Lange Memorial (2008) in Ōtāhuhu features excerpts from Lange's 1977 maiden speech on its north side and from his 1985 Oxford Union debate on its south side.

The David Lange Memorial Trust erected a memorial sculpture by Virginia King in Ōtāhuhu, which was unveiled by Governor-General Sir Anand Satyanand in 2008.

== Honours and awards ==
Lange was bestowed with the mātai, or Samoan chiefly title, of Tagaloa, a title from the village of Le'auva'a.

In the 1990 New Year Honours, Lange was appointed a Member of the Order of the Companions of Honour, and later that year he received the New Zealand 1990 Commemoration Medal. In the 2003 Queen's Birthday Honours, he was appointed a Member of the Order of New Zealand, the country's highest civil honour. He turned down the knighthood that is customarily offered to former prime ministers.

Lange received the Right Livelihood Award in 2003 for his strong fight against nuclear weapons.

== See also ==
- Electoral history of David Lange

== Sources ==
- Barber, David (1987). Gliding on the Lino: The wit and wisdom of David Lange. Auckland: Benton Ross. ISBN 0-908636-29-6.
- Bassett, Michael (2008). Working with David: Inside the Lange Cabinet. Auckland: Hodder Moa. ISBN 978-1-86971-094-1.
- Lange, David (18 July 1994). Cuttings – God Save Us All. Jonathan Hudson & Associates. ISBN 0-473-02953-7.
- Lange, David (1992). Broadsides. Wellington: Jonathon Hudson & Associates; GP Print. ISBN 0-473-01754-7.
- Lange, David (2005). My Life. Auckland: Viking. ISBN 0-670-04556-X.
- McQueen, Harvey (1991). The Ninth Floor: Inside the Prime Minister's Office – A Political Experience. Auckland: Penguin Books.
- Pope, Margaret (2011). At the turning point: my political life with David Lange. Auckland: AM Publications. ISBN 978-0-473-190255.
- Russell, Marcia (1996). Revolution:New Zealand from Fortress to Free Market. Hodder Moa Beckett. ISBN 1869584287.

Government offices
Preceded by Robert Muldoon	Prime Minister of New Zealand; 1984–1989	Succeeded by Geoffrey Palmer
Political offices
Preceded by Geoffrey Palmer	Attorney-General; 1989–1990	Succeeded by Paul East
Preceded by Russell Marshall	Minister of Education; 1987–1989	Succeeded by Geoffrey Palmer
Preceded by Warren Cooper	Minister of Foreign Affairs; 1984–1987	Succeeded by Russell Marshall
Preceded by Bill Rowling	Leader of the Opposition; 1983–1984	Succeeded by Robert Muldoon
New Zealand Parliament
Preceded by Colin Moyle	Member of Parliament for Mangere; 1977–1996	Succeeded by Taito Phillip Field
Party political offices
Preceded by Bill Rowling	Leader of the Labour Party; 1983–1989	Succeeded by Geoffrey Palmer
Preceded by Bob Tizard	Deputy Leader of the Labour Party; 1979–1983	Succeeded by Geoffrey Palmer
