= Electoral history of David Lange =

List of elections featuring David Lange as a candidate

This is a summary of the electoral history of David Lange, Prime Minister of New Zealand (1984–89), Leader of the Labour Party (1983–89), Member of Parliament for Mangere (1977–96).

== Parliamentary elections ==
=== 1975 election ===
General election, 1975: Hobson
Party	Candidate	Votes	%	±%
National	Neill Austin	9,559	51.68	
Social Credit	Howard Manning	5,458	29.51	+0.55
Labour	David Lange	2,703	14.61	
Values	Richard Alspach	774	4.18	
Majority		4,101	22.17	+14.93
Turnout		18,494	84.19	+4.22
Registered electors		21,965		

=== 1977 by-election ===
1977 Mangere by-election
Party	Candidate	Votes	%	±%
Labour	David Lange	9,766	58.27	
National	Clem Simich	5,107	30.48	
Social Credit	Bill Owens	1,026	6.10	−0.07
Values	Frank Grayson	789	4.71	−1.02
Worker's Labour	Barry Moss	28	0.17	
Alpha	Paul Magoffin	18	0.11	
Independent Labour	Barry Shaw	17	0.10	
Socialist Action	Brigid Mulrennan	7	0.04	
Majority		4,659	27.80	
Turnout		16,758	64.31	−15.35
Registered electors		26,058		
Labour hold		Swing		

=== 1978 election ===
1978 general election: Mangere
Party	Candidate	Votes	%	±%
Labour	David Lange	9,104	66.23	+7.96
National	Peter Saunders	2,841	20.67	
Social Credit	H J Meiklejohn	1,655	12.04	
Values	V A Strachan	144	1.04	
Majority		6,263	45.56	+17.76
Turnout		13,744	63.92	−0.39
Registered electors		21,499		

=== 1981 election ===
1981 general election: Mangere
Party	Candidate	Votes	%	±%
Labour	David Lange	8,739	62.25	−3.98
Social Credit	John Petit	2,933	20.89	
National	David Perry	2,366	16.85	
Majority		5,806	41.35	−4.21
Turnout		14,038	82.57	+18.65
Registered electors		17,001		

=== 1984 election ===
1984 general election: Mangere
Party	Candidate	Votes	%	±%
Labour	David Lange	10,676	72.83	+10.58
National	Peter Saunders	2,301	15.69	
NZ Party	John Meyer	1,096	7.47	
Social Credit	Terry John Brooks	584	3.98	
Majority		8,375	57.13	+15.78
Turnout		14,657	86.21	+3.64
Registered electors		17,001		

=== 1987 election ===
1987 general election: Mangere
Party	Candidate	Votes	%	±%
Labour	David Lange	8,804	70.60	−2.23
National	Ron Jeffery	2,785	22.33	
Democrats	Ken Harris	724	5.80	
Mana Motuhake (political party)	K K Pene	156	1.25	
Majority		6,019	48.27	−8.86
Turnout		12,469	81.35	−4.86
Registered electors		15,326		

=== 1990 election ===
1990 general election: Mangere
Party	Candidate	Votes	%	±%
Labour	David Lange	7,184	51.10	−19.50
National	Bryan Archer	3,145	22.37	
NewLabour	Len Richards	1,658	11.79	
Green	Brian Edwards	832	5.91	
Democrats	Ken Harris	148	1.05	
Independent	Joshua Deane	55	0.39	
Majority		4,039	28.73	−19.54
Turnout		14,058	79.73	−1.62
Registered electors		17,631		

=== 1993 election ===
1993 general election: Mangere
Party	Candidate	Votes	%	±%
Labour	David Lange	8,345	55.12	+4.02
Alliance	Len Richards	2,387	15.76	+3.97
NZ First	Bryan Archer	2,037	13.45	−8.92
National	Hinu Te Hau	1,120	7.39	
Christian Heritage	Clark Nemeth	135	0.89	
Communist League	Karen Davis	84	0.55	
McGillicuddy Serious	Alister Webb	77	0.50	
Natural Law	Grant Bilyard	53	0.35	
Majority		5,958	39.36	+10.63
Turnout		15,137	83.00	−3.27
Registered electors		18,237		

== Leadership elections ==
=== 1979 Deputy-leadership election ===
Candidate	Votes	%
David Lange	20	52.64
Bob Tizard	18	47.36
Majority	2	5.26
Turnout	38	—

=== 1980 Leadership election ===
Candidate	Votes	%
Bill Rowling	19	51.40
David Lange	18	48.60
Majority	1	2.70
Turnout	37	—

=== 1981 Deputy-leadership election ===
Candidate	Votes	%
David Lange	42	97.72
No confidence	1	2.28
Majority	41	93.18
Turnout	43	—

=== 1983 Leadership election ===
Candidate	Votes	%
David Lange	33	78.57
Russell Marshall	9	21.43
Majority	24	57.14
Turnout	42	—

=== 1988 Leadership election ===
Candidate	Votes	%
David Lange	38	71.70
Roger Douglas	15	28.30
Majority	23	43.30
Turnout	53	—
