= Archives Act 1957 =

Act of Parliament in New Zealand

New Zealand Parliament
- Long title: An Act to provide for the custody and preservation of the public archives of New Zealand
- Royal assent: 4 October 1957
- Administered by: Department of Internal Affairs

Legislative history
- Introduced by: Sid Smith
- Passed: 1957

Repeals
- 2005

Related legislation
- Public Records Act 2005
- Status: Repealed

The Archives Act 1957 of New Zealand consolidated the law relating to public recordkeeping.

== Overview ==
The Archives Act 1957 was a piece of legislation in New Zealand that established the framework for the custody and preservation of public archives including:

- Establishment of National Archives: The Act created the National Archives within the Department of Internal Affairs and appointed a Chief Archivist to oversee the archives.
- Custody and Preservation: It mandated the deposit of public archives in the National Archives and required that public records not be destroyed or disposed of without the Chief Archivist's authoritsation.
- Public Access: The Act affirmed public access to the National Archives, ensuring that the public could view historical records.
- Disposal of Records: The Chief Archivist had the power to approve the disposal of official records and could require the transfer of records to the National Archives after 25 years.

The Archives Act 1957 was eventually replaced by the Public Records Act 2005, which expanded the role of Archives New Zealand and addressed the management of digital records.
