= Archives New Zealand =

National archives

Coordinates: 41.277167°S 174.78°E

Archives New Zealand Te Rua Mahara o te Kāwanatanga

Agency overview
- Jurisdiction: New Zealand government recordkeeping and community archives
- Headquarters: Mulgrave Street, Thorndon, Wellington
- Minister responsible: Brooke Van Velden, Minister of Internal Affairs
- Agency executive: Anahera Morehu, Chief Archivist
- Parent agency: Department of Internal Affairs
- Website: www.archives.govt.nz

Archives New Zealand (Māori: Te Rua Mahara o te Kāwanatanga) is New Zealand's national archive. As the government's recordkeeping authority, it administers the Public Records Act 2005 and promotes good information management throughout government.

== History ==
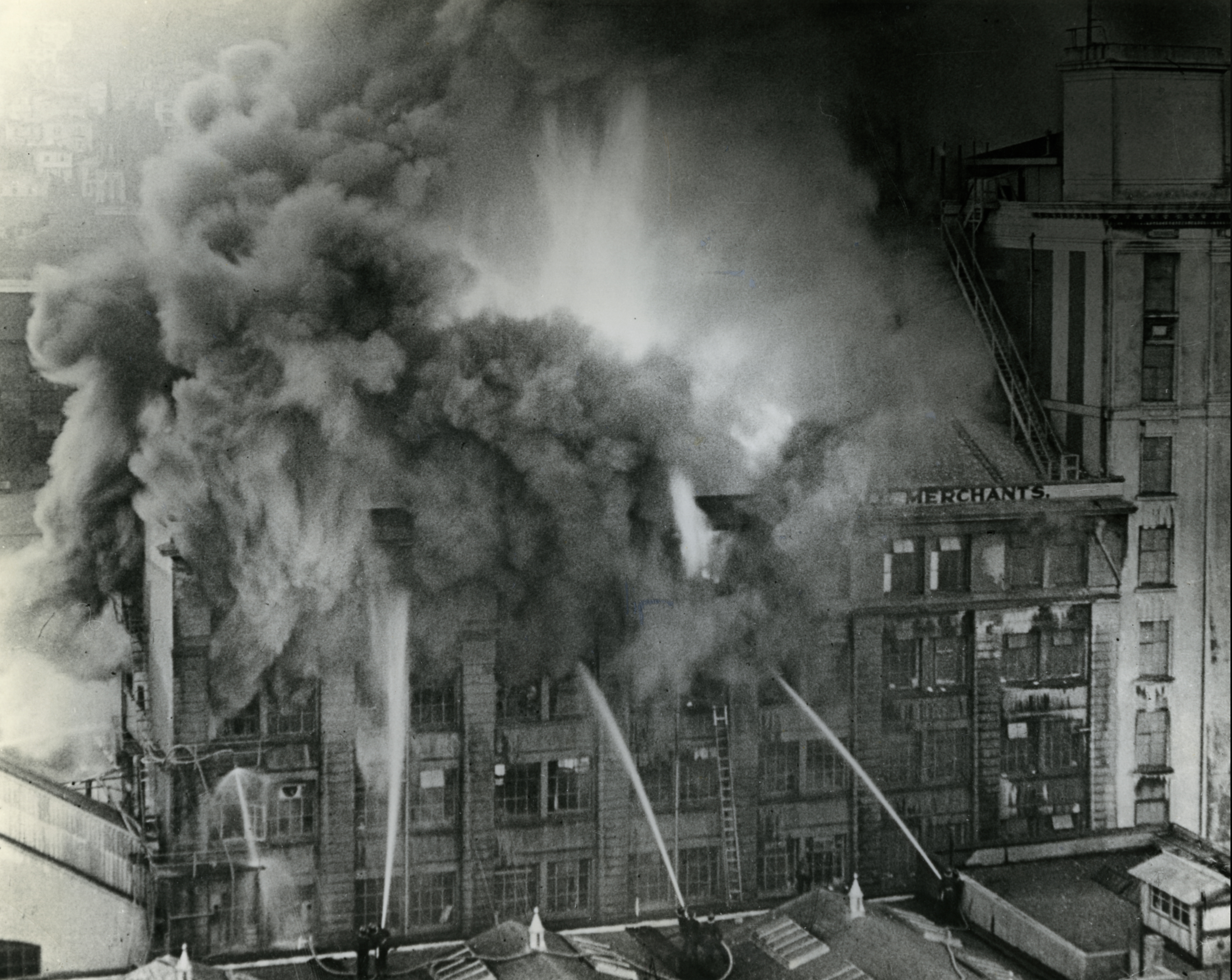
On 29 July 1952, fire ripped through the Hope Gibbons Building in Wellington, destroying much of New Zealand's public records.

=== Establishment ===
In 1954, the First National Government's cabinet approved the establishment of a national archive and the office of a chief archivist, and the drafting of enabling legislation. The Archives Act 1957 established the National Archives within the Department of Internal Affairs (DIA). It also gave the chief archivist the power to approve the disposal of official records and to require the transfer of records to the National Archives after 25 years. The Archives Act also affirmed public access to the National Archives. While the National Archives were established in 1957, they were preceded by the Dominion Archives and the former war archives at the Hope Gibbons building in Wellington.

=== Expansion and legislative entrenchment ===
In 1977, an amendment to the Local Government Act 1974 extended limited protection to local government archives. For the first twenty years, the National Archives had to contend with inadequate storage and staffing. Following Wilfred I. Smith's report, the Government took steps to address those issues, the headquarters moving into the 1966 4-storey building of the former Government Printing Office on Thorndon Quay in 1990. The National Archives' legal position was further entrenched by the passage of legislation such as the Ombudsmen Act 1975, the Official Information Act 1982, and the State Sector Act 1988.

In 2000, the National Archives was separated from the Department of Internal Affairs and renamed as Archives New Zealand.

In 2005, the Fifth Labour Government passed the Public Records Act 2005 to deal with digital archives and the creation of state-owned enterprises. The Act also greatly expanded the role of Archives New Zealand and the powers of the Chief Archivist, and established the Archives Council to advise the Minister responsible for Archives New Zealand. The organisation now has a leadership role for recordkeeping throughout central and local government.

=== Reintegration under Internal Affairs, 2011–present ===
In 2011, Archives New Zealand and the National Library of New Zealand were merged back into the Department of Internal Affairs. Until February 2011 Archives New Zealand had been a separate government department.

In 2018, the Christchurch office moved to a new location in Wigram near the Air Force Museum of New Zealand.

The New Zealand Archivist Vol 3 No 1 pages 5–10 includes a comprehensive history of archives in New Zealand.

In December 2020, the DIA announced that Archives NZ along with the National Library and Ngā Taonga Sound & Vision would move to a proposed purpose-built business park called the Horowhenua Business Park in Levin at an unspecified future date. However, the Levin relocation project was not fully funded in later Budget bids and eventually cancelled by April 2024.

In February 2022 Internal Affairs Minister Jan Tinetti, Archives NZ chief archivist Stephen Clarke and Māori iwi (tribe) Taranaki Whānui Te Āti Awa confirmed that the Government would build a new archives building on the site of the former Defence House on Wellington's Aitken Street between the present Archives NZ and National Library buildings. The new NZ$290 million building will have 19,300sqm of lettable area and is expected to open in 2026. It will host archives repository and specialist facilities for Archives NZ, the National Library and Ngā Taonga Sound & Vision.

On 9 May 2024, Archives NZ halted its digitisation programme which had commenced seven years ago, citing the programme's time-limited funding. The disestablishment of the digitisation programme is expected to cause the loss of three permanent jobs and some fixed time positions. Historian Vincent O'Malley described the termination of the digitisation programme as "a devastating blow."

On 21 October 2026, Archives NZ and the National Library confirmed plans to lay off 45 jobs, amounting to 11 percent of their workforce.

== Facilities ==
The national office for Archives New Zealand is in Wellington. It also has offices in Auckland, Christchurch, and Dunedin.

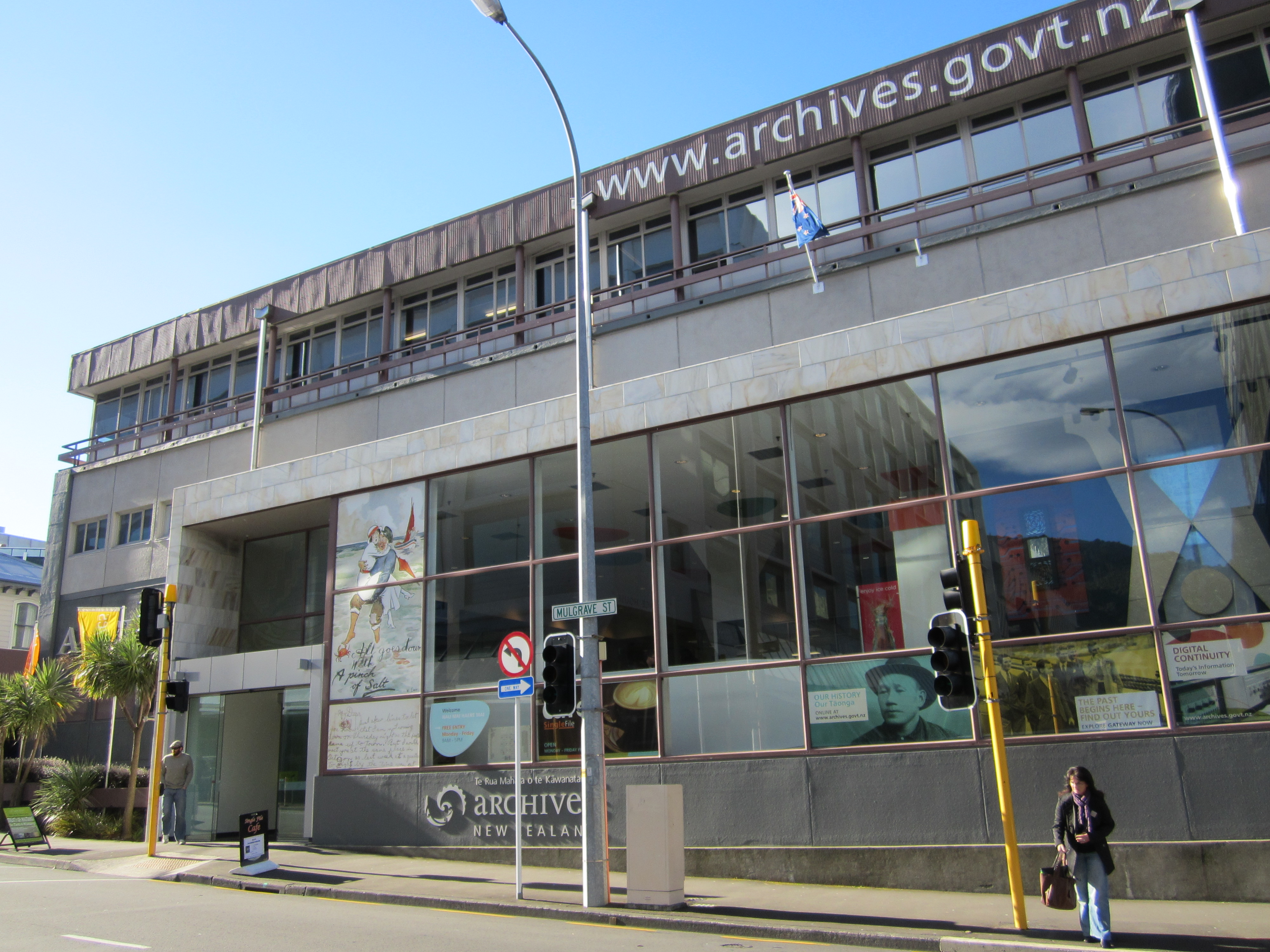
Archives New Zealand National Office in Wellington

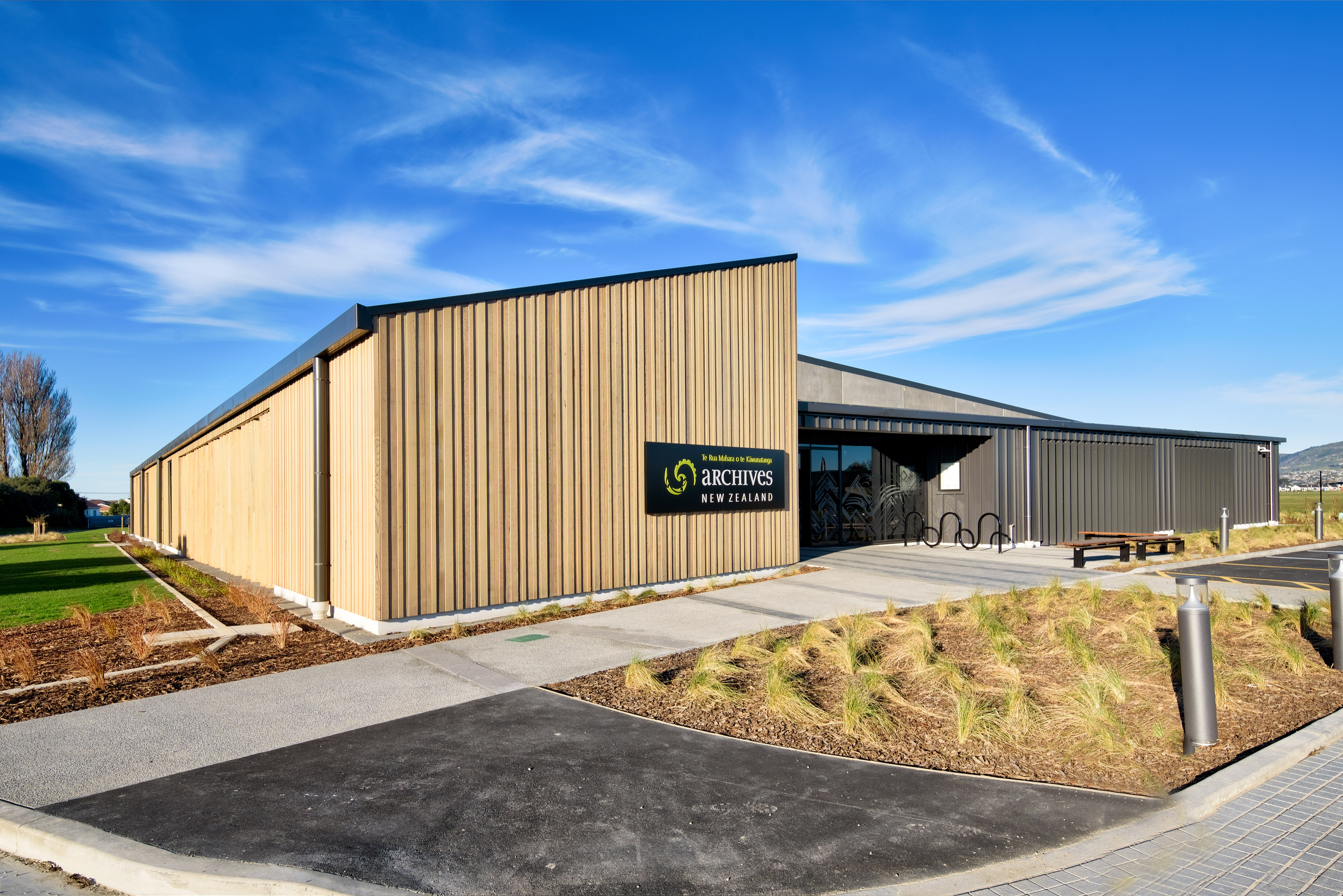
Archives New Zealand Christchurch Office

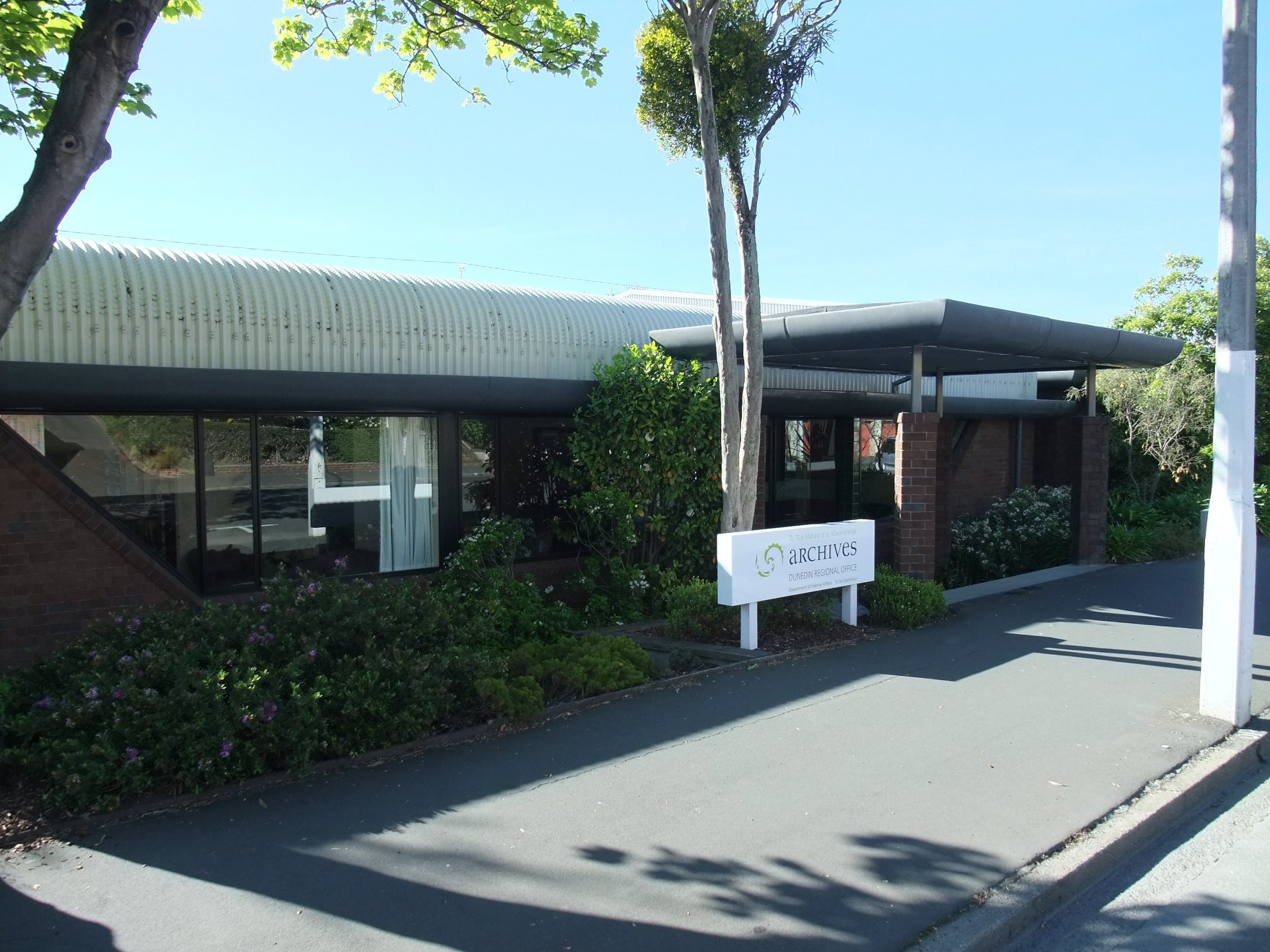
Archives New Zealand Dunedin Office

=== Te Rua ===
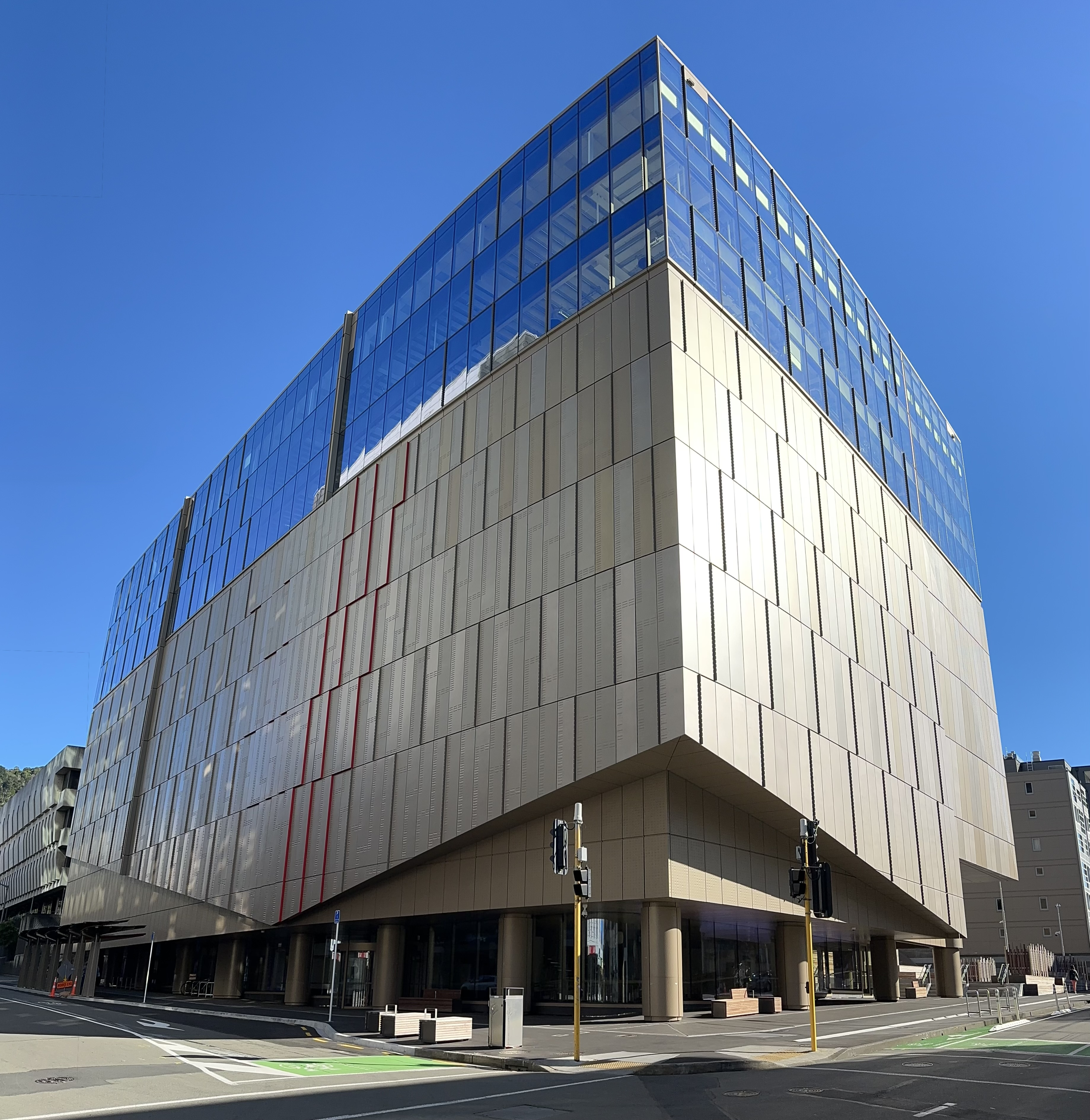
Te Rua building in April 2025

A new $290 million national archives facility named Te Rua was completed in Wellington in July 2025. The new facility, which began construction in 2022, has a greater capacity to house the country's rapidly growing archival collections and to maintain and protect collections during incidents such as power outages and earthquakes. Its design has been created with te ao Māori worldview in mind, with design agency Tīhei and Māori sculptural artist Rangi Kipa working alongside architects Warren & Mahoney to "connect the building to the land it sits on and acknowledge the tūpuna who lived there before".

The Department of Internal Affairs worked alongside Fund Managers AMP Capital Ltd to build the new Archives facility with construction partners, LT McGuiness.

== List of Chief Archivists ==
Sources

- Secretary of Internal Affairs exercised Chief Archivist powers (1957–1962)
- Michael Standish (1962)
- John Pascoe (1963–1972)
- Judith S. Hornabrook (1972–1982)
- Ray F. Grover (1981–1991)
- Kathryn Patterson (1991–1998)
- Chris Hurley (Acting) (1998–2000)
- Lyn Provost (Acting) (2000–2001)
- Dianne Macaskill (2001–2009)
- Greg Goulding (Acting) (2009–2011)
- Greg Goulding (2011–2014)
- Marilyn Little (2014–2017)
- Richard Foy (Acting) (2017–2018)
- Richard Foy (2018–2020)
- Stephen Clarke (2020–2022)
- Anahera Morehu (Acting) (2022–2023)
- Anahera Morehu (2023– )

The position of Director of National Archives and Chief Archivist were held simultaneously since late 1982.

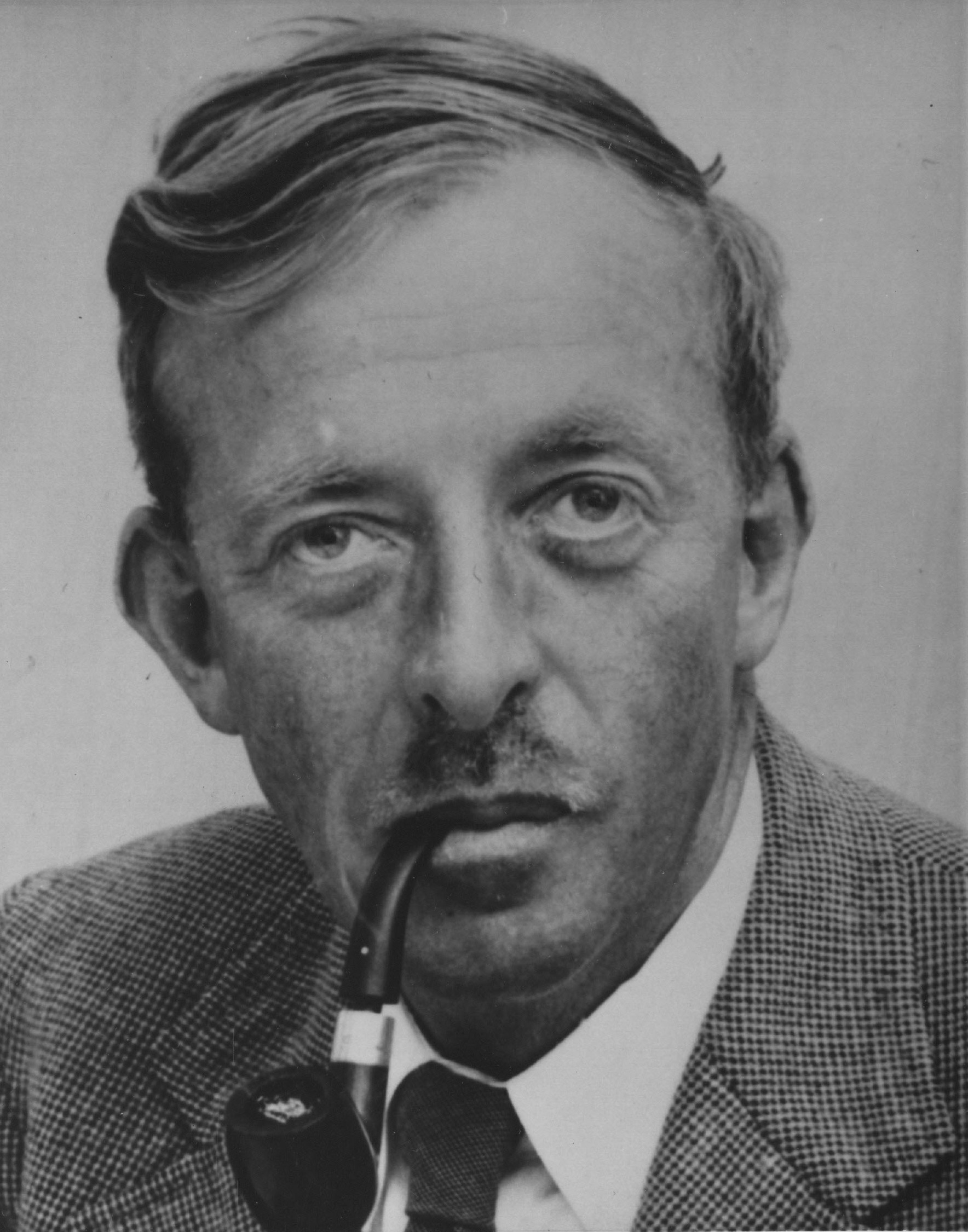
John Pascoe (1963–1972)

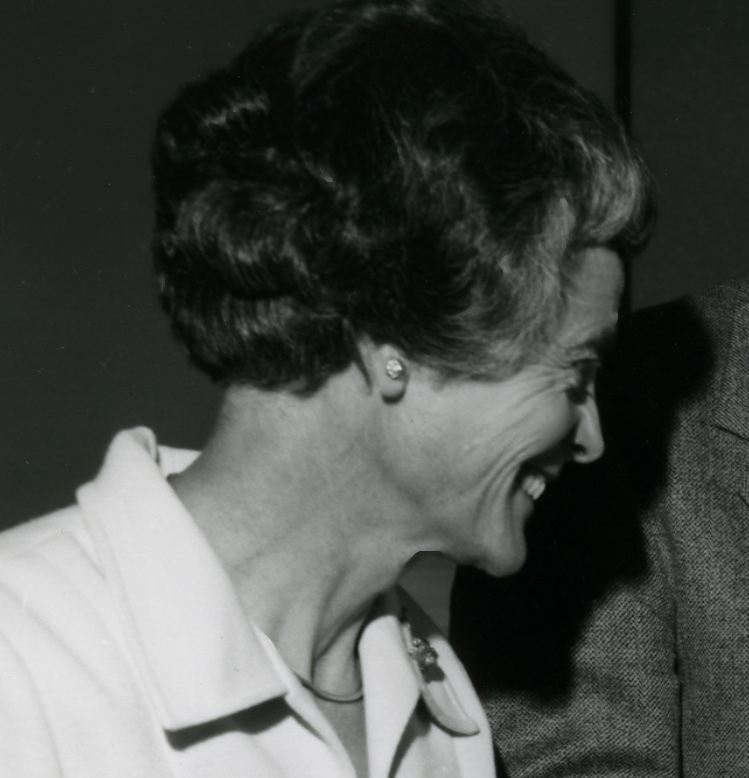
Judith S. Hornabrook (1972–1982)

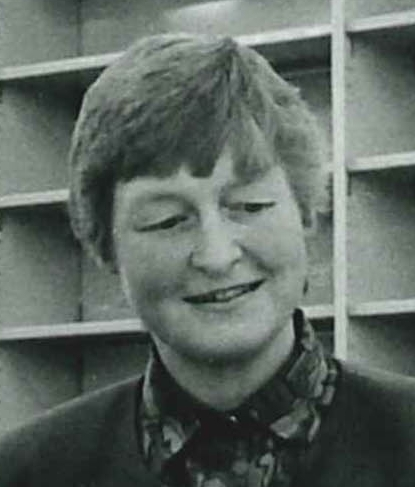
Kathryn Patterson (1991–1998)

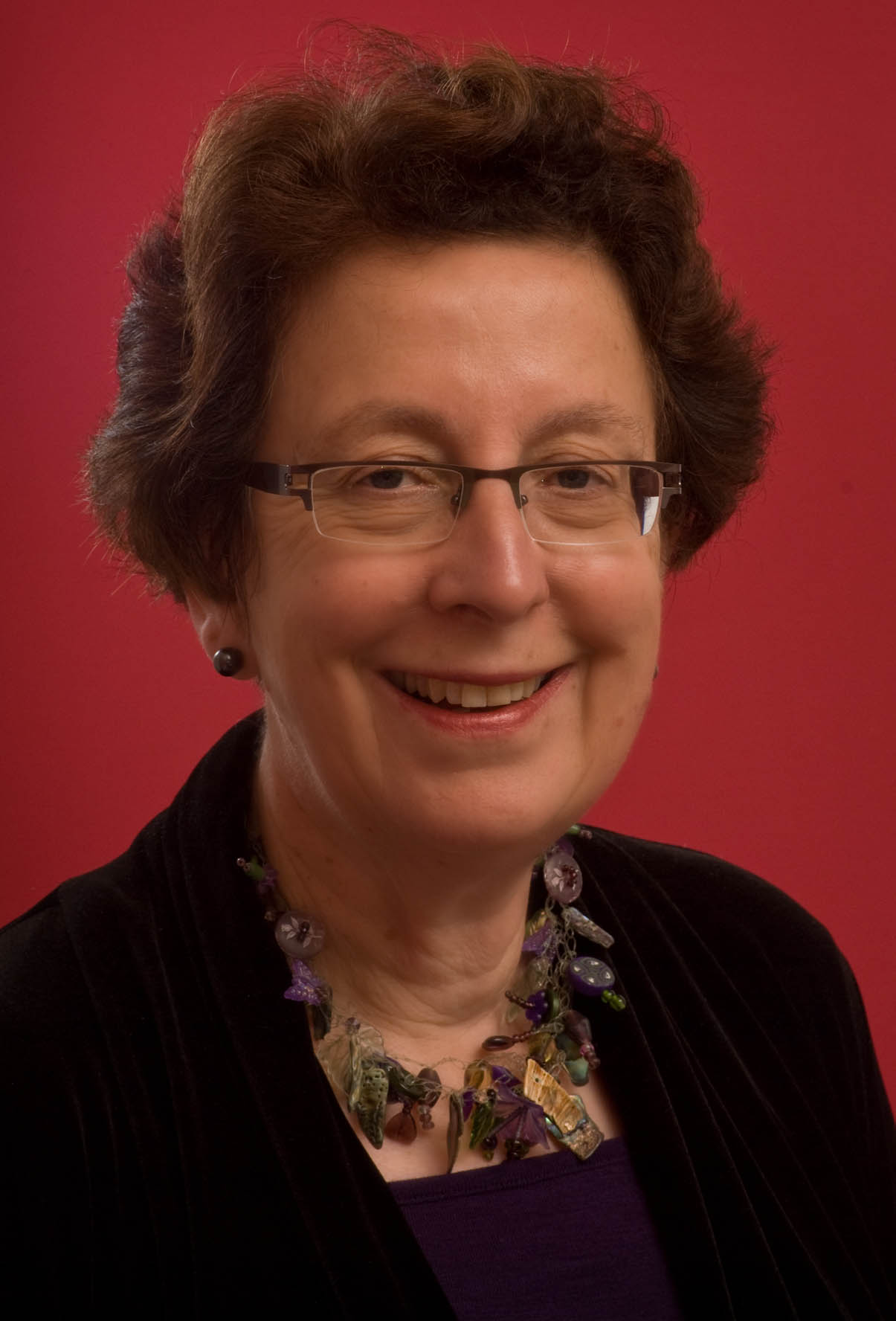
Dianne Macaskill (2001–2009)

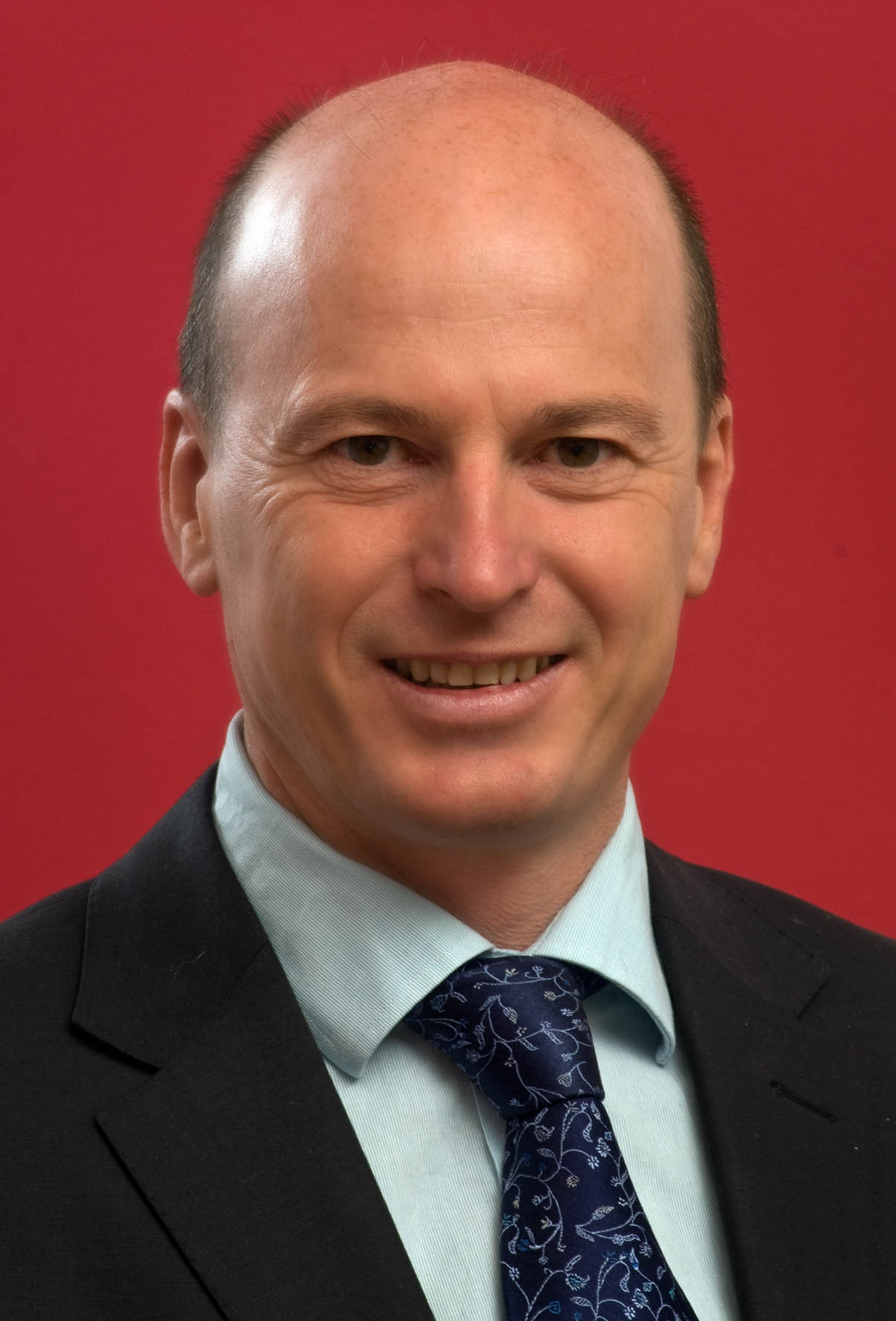
Greg Goulding (2009–2011)

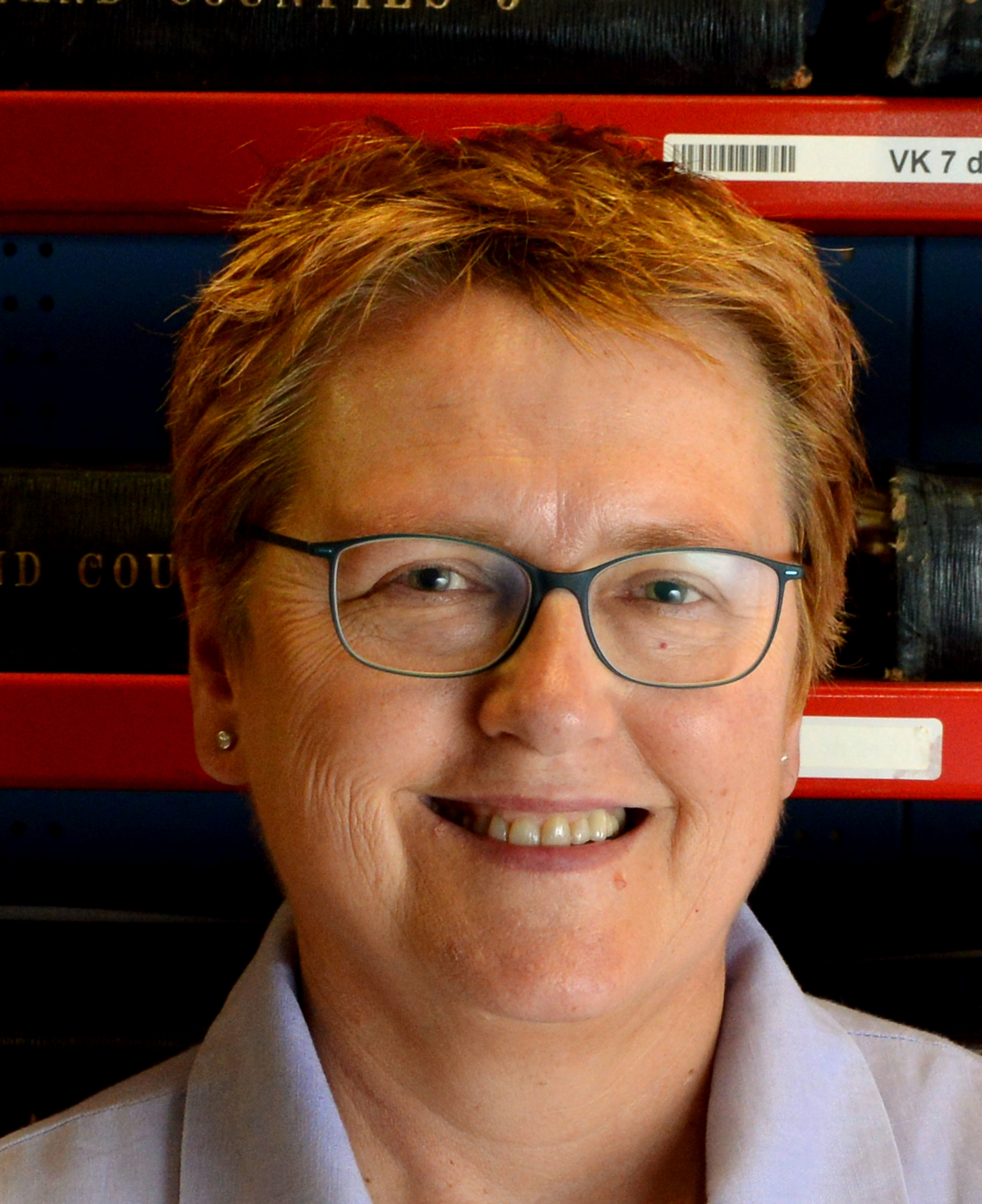
Marilyn Little (2014–2017)

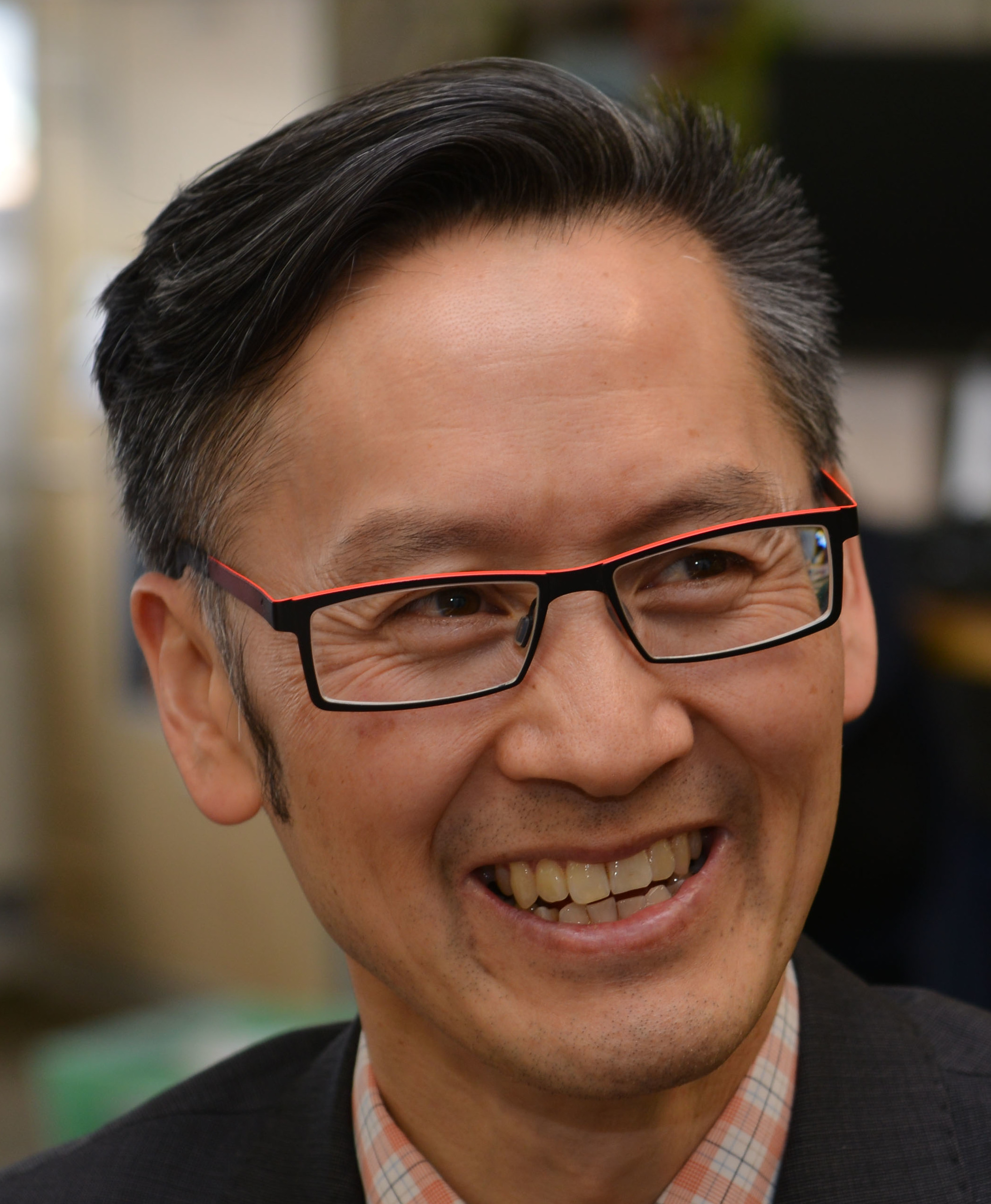
Richard Foy (2017–2020)

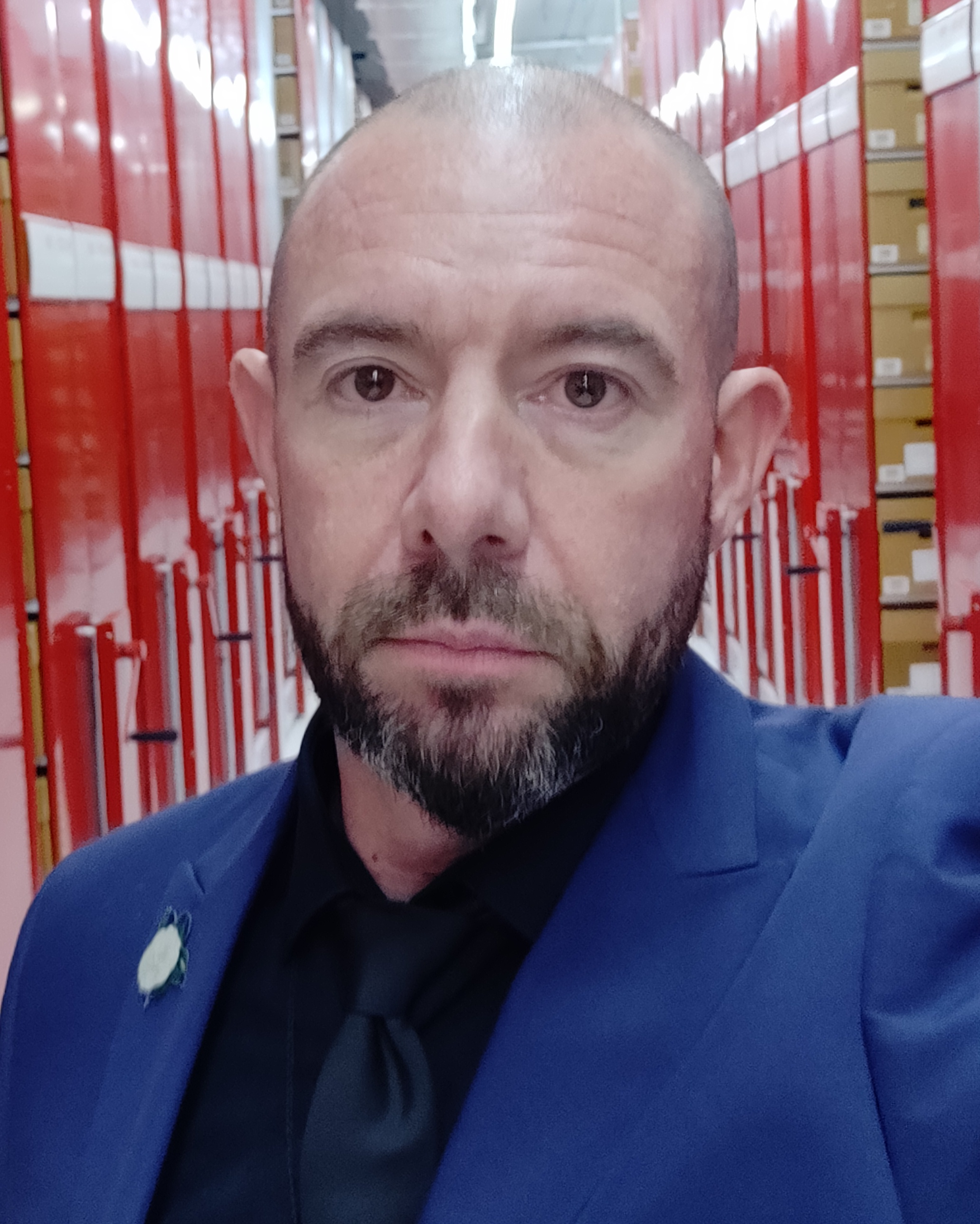
Stephen Clarke (2020-2022)

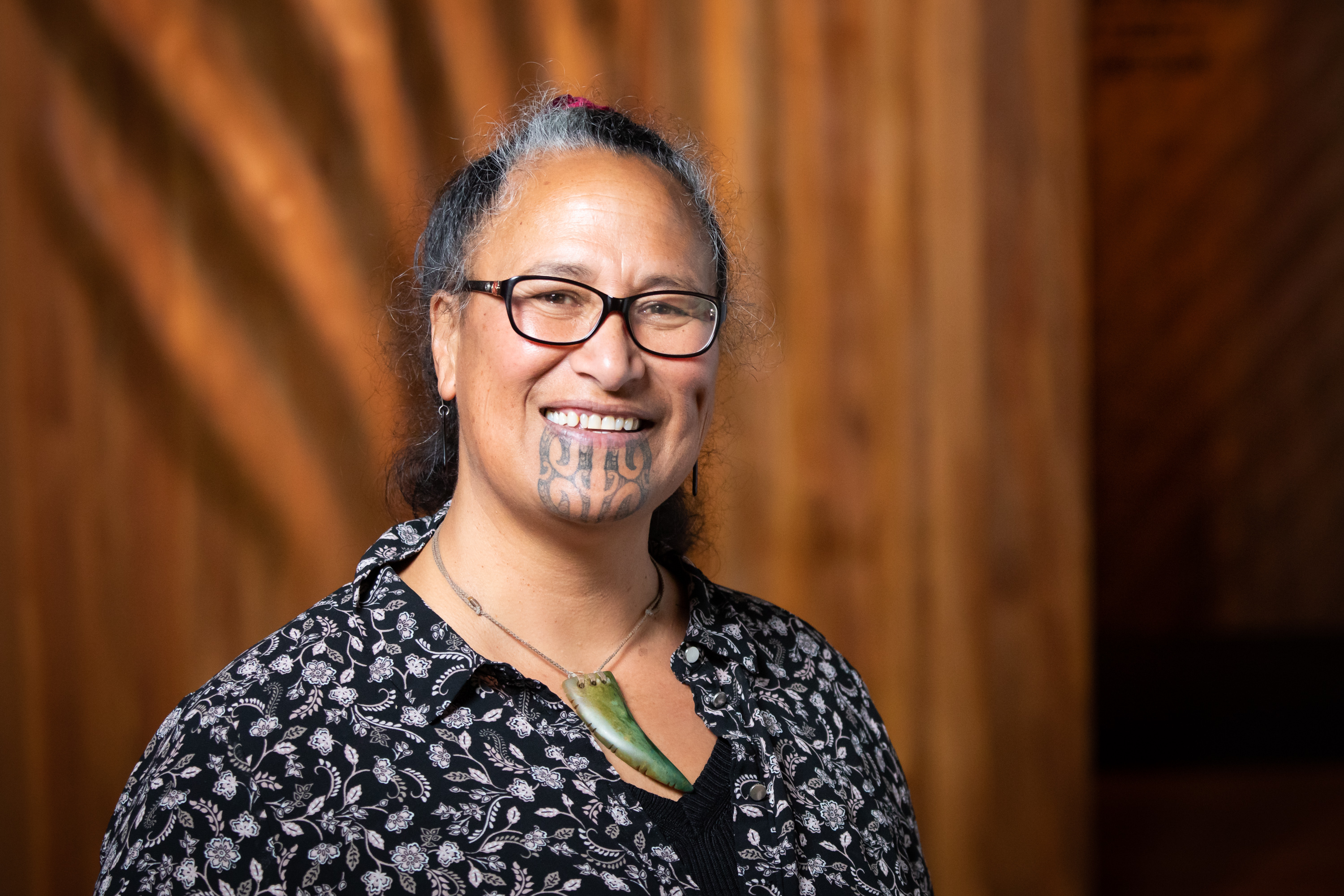
Anahera Morehu (2022– )

== Organisation ==
Archives New Zealand has four units:

- Regional & Access Services;
- Archives Management;
- Government Recordkeeping; and
- Māori & Community Archives.

== Functions ==
Archives New Zealand:

- manages the Public Records Act 2005 and works with government agencies to administer the Act;
- makes sure records of government decision making are created and those of long-term value, including digital, are transferred into its care;
- provides recordkeeping advice and information to government agencies;
- makes public archives accessible to government departments, other organisations and the public;
- manages the public archives in a protected and secure environment; and
- provides leadership and support for archival activities across New Zealand.

Information and Records Management Standard

Archive information and records management standards are of the utmost importance as it ensures consistency of delivery for organisations utilising Archive NZ's services. For Archives New Zealand, they act as underpinning principles for their purpose of collecting, preserving, and providing access to records which hold historical, legal and cultural significance. Under section 27 of the Public Records Act 2005, the Chief Archivist of Archives New Zealand holds this responsibility and has issued such standards. To issue a standard, the Chief Archivist must make a copy of the draft available and have a process in place to communicate with every public office, approved repository, local authority and any other person considered to be impacted by or interested in the proposed standard.

These standards support and establish how Archive NZ can manage their information and records systematically and efficiently. It outlines the obligations of Archives NZ and other regulated organisations under the Public Records Act and sets out the minimum level of compliance that these organisations must meet. ‘Records are considered to be any information, regardless of form and format, from documents through to data’. Alongside this, they are also used as evidence of business activity and information assets. They also include metadata which is managed as a record.

The standard also supports the rights of Māori, under the Treaty of Waitangi/Te Tiriti o Waitangi to access, use and reuse any information and records that are taonga.

Information and records are key strategic assets for the public sector. Therefore, managing information and records appropriately is important in various different ways for Archives NZ including enabling the public to hold the government accountable; helps any organisations plan for and achieve their objectives; gives information to support informed decision making; outlines individual responsibilities; documents individuals and different groups entitlements; encourages collaboration and communication; facilities groups to be creative and also ensures that important public knowledge is available for research, discovery and reuse.

With these important factors to consider, all information and records should be:

- trustworthy and managed accountably
- readily accessible, understandable and usable
- valued as critical to business operations
- part of an organisation's approach to risk management
- maintained to meet business, government and community purposes

=== Regulatory role and powers ===
Archives New Zealand are the regulators of all information created by the public sector in New Zealand. Their regulatory role is to ensure information is created and managed to a high standard, to ensure transparency and accountability and support the rights and entitlements of New Zealand citizens.

In order to execute this role, Archives New Zealand are granted several directive powers. Their regulatory tools include:

- Direction to report: A report back order issued by the Chief Archivist to organisations with record keeping practices that arise concern.
- Inspection: The inspection of public records, local authority records and local authority archives by the Chief Archivist if information management issues have arisen within public offices or local authorities.
- Audit: Audits are regularly carried out by independent auditors in order to determine the health of information management in the public sector.
- Issuing of penalties: It is an offence under the Public Records Act to willfully or negligently damage, dispose of, or destroy any public record, unless it is authorised under by the Chief Archivist. Archives New Zealand can impose penalties on individuals or organisations that do not comply with the PRA. Persons convicted of an offence may also be trespassed from Archives offices and services.

== Archives Council Te Rua Wānanga ==
The Archives Council Te Rua Wānanga is an unincorporated body established under the Public Records Act 2005. It provides independent advice to the Minister responsible for Archives New Zealand on recordkeeping and archives matters, including those for which tikanga Māori is relevant.

The Archives Council meets four times a year to discuss archival and record keeping matters. The Council reports directly to the Minister on its functions during the preceding year. The Minister, as soon as practicable, presents the report to the House of Representatives.

The Archives Council's reports to the Minister are available on Archives New Zealand's website.

== Holdings ==
Archives New Zealand holds more than 7 million New Zealand government records dating from the early 19th to the early 21st century. Records held include the originals of the Treaty of Waitangi, government documents, maps, paintings, photographs and film.

Significant holdings include:

- the archives of the New Zealand Company;
- the New Zealand Parliament's archives;
- commissions of inquiry documents;
- most higher court records;
- archives of government agencies;
- New Zealand Defence Force archives.
- the National Film Unit Weekly Review and Pictorial Parade archives; audiovisual weekly news bulletin archives dating between 1941 and 1971, which were included as an entry on the UNESCO Memory of the World Aotearoa New Zealand Ngā Mahara o te Ao register in 2011.
- the Māori Land Court minute books archives, which were included as an entry on the UNESCO Memory of the World Aotearoa New Zealand Ngā Mahara o te Ao registerin 2012.
- the Crown Purchase Deeds, deeds to land purchases from Māori by the Crown, included as an entry on the UNESCO Memory of the World Aotearoa New Zealand Ngā Mahara o te Ao register in 2020.
- the Canterbury Provincial Government Archives 1853–1877, inscribed on the UNESCO Memory of the World Aotearoa New Zealand Ngā Mahara o te Ao register in 2023.

Archives New Zealand does not solely collect government records. In fact, the institution also collects a wide range of materials that document New Zealand's social, cultural, and economic history. This includes personal papers, community archives, and business records, as well as photographs, audiovisual materials, maps, and other types of records. Personal papers are one example of the non-government records held by Archives New Zealand. These papers may include diaries, letters, and photographs that provide a glimpse into the everyday lives of New Zealanders in different periods of history.

Community archives are another type of non-government record held by Archives New Zealand. These archives may include records of local organisations and events, such as sports clubs, churches, and community groups, that reflect the social and cultural diversity of New Zealand.

Business records are also held by Archives New Zealand, and these documents provide insight into the development of key industries and sectors in New Zealand, such as agriculture, forestry, and manufacturing.

Archives New Zealand's collection of non-government records is an important resource for researchers, historians, and the wider public, and it contributes to the preservation and promotion of New Zealand's cultural heritage.

=== Finding records held ===
Researchers can search descriptions of the records using Archway, an online database of records held at Archives New Zealand. Archives New Zealand has developed preservation programs and facilities to ensure that records are protected from damage and degradation. The organisation collaborates with the National Library of New Zealand and other cultural heritage institutions to digitize and provide access to a wide range of digital content.

=== Physical records access ===
Access to holdings is available through four reading rooms in Auckland, Wellington, Christchurch and Dunedin, and through a remote reference service. 110,205 linear metres of physical archives were held in storage as at June 2018.

While most records held by Archives New Zealand are open to the public, some access restrictions may apply based on factors such as the sensitivity of the information and the privacy of individuals.

In addition to preserving and providing access to historical records, Archives New Zealand also works with government agencies to manage their records. This includes providing guidance on record-keeping practices, developing standards for records management, and overseeing the transfer of records to Archives New Zealand for preservation and access.

=== Digitised records ===
In 2019 Archives New Zealand changed their CMS provider to Axiell Collections. Axiell are well known as a software supplier in the archives sector. Their mantra that culture should be preserved, shared and accessible through high quality systems, was a key reason for Axiell winning the contract, leading to Archives New Zealand moving from their previous system Archway. A view was to make the software more agile and efficient for archives staff, as well as New Zealanders having enhanced access to New Zealand's archives and taonga.

In late 2022, Axiell Collections was responsible for security breaches of which Axiell formally apologised for. This was due to technology failings, in conjunction with data entry errors, leading to a shutdown of the system for multiple days on multiple occasions. The security breach entailed public members being able to access restricted files through the new system, with 9000 files opened to being exposed. The files were related to the Royal Commission of Inquiry into Abuse in Care. In particular they were three sets of health records in a 21-year period from 1952, from a mental health facility in Canterbury. As stated, Axiell has issued a formal apology and are pouring significant resources into fixing the situation.

Digitised records are also available via DigitalNZ. A selection of records are also available on Archives New Zealand's social media channels, including YouTube and Flickr.

Examples of digitised records available:

- New Zealand Defence Force (NZDF) Personnel Files from the First World War – over 141,000 service files digitised.
- New Zealand Official War Art Collection.
- Crown Purchase Deeds.
- Māori (native) school records and,
- Samoan Land Deeds – Series 18962.

Details of what is digitised by topic can be found on Archives New Zealand's website.

== Exhibitions ==
=== He Tohu exhibition ===
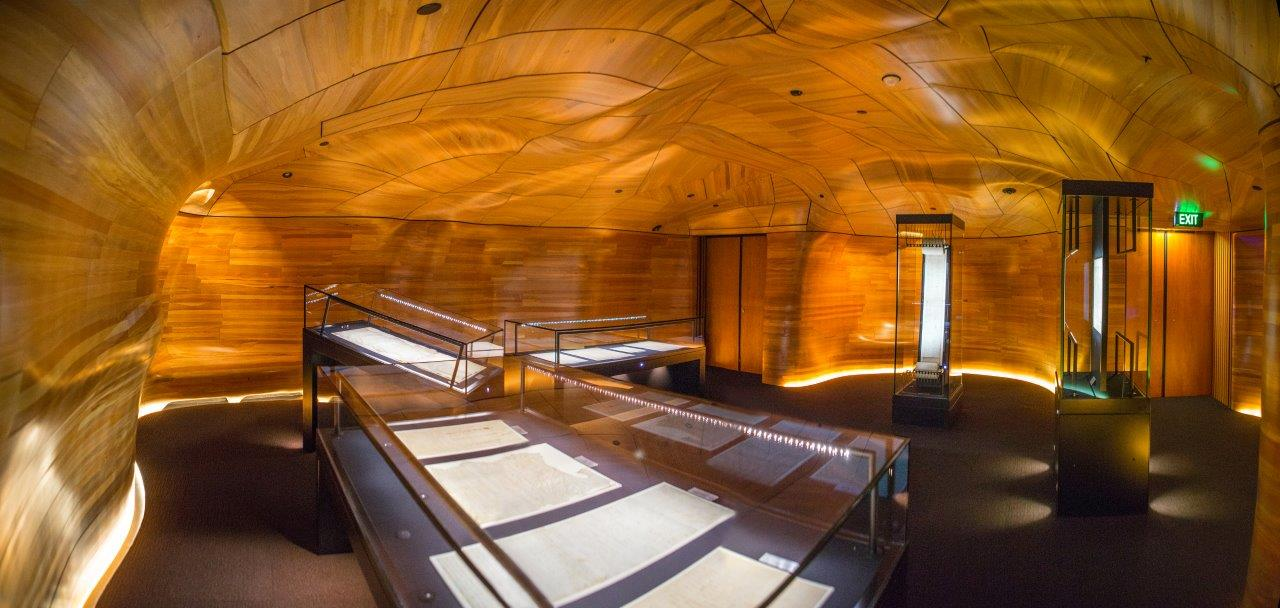
He Tohu Document Room

In May 2017, a new permanent archive exhibition He Tohu, opened at the National Library of New Zealand building on Molesworth Street, Wellington.

He Tohu is an exhibition of three of New Zealand's most significant constitutional documents:

- 1835 He Whakaputanga o te Rangatiratanga o Nu Tireni – the Declaration of Independence of the Chiefs of New Zealand (the Declaration);
- 1840 Te Tiriti o Waitangi – the Treaty of Waitangi; and
- 1893 Women's Suffrage Petition – Te Petihana Whakamana Pōti Wahine.

The development of the exhibition began in 2014. It provides an award-winning document room containing the latest exhibition technology and a surrounding interactive space for visitors to learn about the documents and the people who signed them. He Tohu is accompanied by an education and outreach programme including an online component to make it accessible for those not Wellington-based. He Tohu is presented by Archives New Zealand and the National Library of New Zealand, both of which are part of the Department of Internal Affairs. The documents remain in the care of the Chief Archivist under the Public Records Act 2005.

== Associated Organisations ==
=== Archives and Records Association of New Zealand (ARANZ) – Te Huinga Mahara ===
Prior to its establishment in 1976, ARANZ was a part of the New Zealand Library Association (NZLA). At this point in time, the NZLA contained a mix of historians, genealogists, librarians and archivists, however, there was a need voiced by archivists to become more focused on their specialty. This was the catalyst for its creation. The original intention was for it to be open to public, serving as more of an interest group rather than limiting membership to archive professionals only. This is the form that remains to this day.

ARANZ are an incorporated society that are a key stakeholder in the archive sector. Members include professional organisations, historians and of course: archivists. There are a variety of reasons why ARANZ are a significant partner for Archives New Zealand (as well as similar organisations). Namely, ARANZ serves as a leader regarding best industry practice for care, preservation, and administration of historical records; they hold an advocacy role for the sector which includes submissions to government regarding enhancements to existing legislation; a further role includes facilitating employee upskilling through shared knowledge as well advisory duties to appropriate educational facilities; and they produce regular publications and reports to facilitate these functions.

Overall, due to ARANZ and their role as a key stakeholder in the sector, Archives New Zealand is supported in achieving their objectives outlined in the Public Records Act 2005. Amongst other roles, these are: maintaining stewardship of public records; ensuring records of government decision making are stored appropriately with the intention of long-term sustainability at the forefront of this function; ensuring records with long term value are transferred into its service; providing recordkeeping advice and information to government departments; making sure public archives are accessible to government, other organisations as well as the public; managing public archives in a protected and secure environment; and the provision of leadership and advocacy within the sector.

== See also ==
- List of national archives
- National Library of New Zealand
