= Dianne Macaskill =

New Zealand public servant

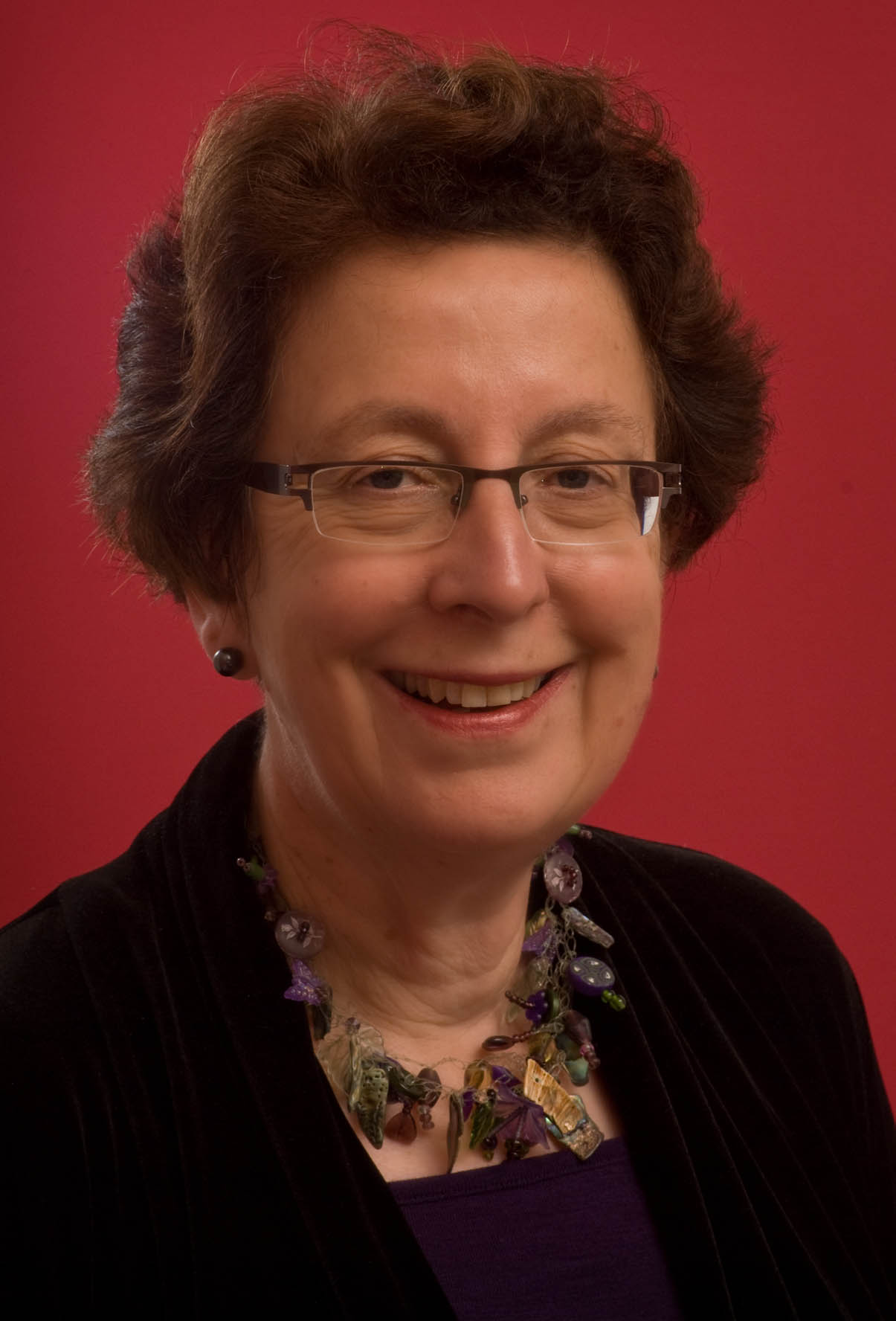

Chief Executive and Chief Archivist (Archives New Zealand)
- In office 11 June 2001 – 10 June 2009
- Prime Minister: Helen Clark
- Succeeded by: Greg Goulding

Deputy Government Statistician (Statistics New Zealand)

Dianne Mary Macaskill is a New Zealand public servant. She was the Chief Executive and Chief Archivist of Archives New Zealand. She started in this role on 11 June 2001 and finished her term on 10 June 2009.

Prior to being the Chief Archivist, Macaskill held the position of Deputy Government Statistician at Statistics New Zealand. She worked in the public sector from 1971, and holds a BSc from Victoria University of Wellington.
