= Shadow Cabinet of Jenny Shipley =

New Zealand shadow cabinet (1999–2001)

New Zealand political leader Jenny Shipley assembled a "shadow cabinet" within the National Party caucus after her election to the position of Leader of the Opposition in 1999. She composed this of individuals who acted for the party as spokespeople in assigned roles while she was Leader of the Opposition (1999–2001).

As the National Party formed the largest party not in government at the time, the shadow cabinet was as a result the Official Opposition within the New Zealand House of Representatives.

== Portfolio allocations ==
=== January 2001 ===
The list below contains a list of Shipley's spokespeople and their respective roles after an early 2001 portfolio reshuffle. The portfolio allocations were announced on 31 January 2001 and the rankings were announced on 12 February, after Bill English was elected the party's deputy leader.

Rank	Shadow Minister	Portfolio
1	Rt Hon Jenny Shipley	Leader of the Opposition
2	Hon Bill English	Deputy Leader of the Opposition; Spokesperson for Finance; Spokesperson for Audit; Spokesperson for Superannuation for Future Retirees
3	Hon Roger Sowry	Shadow Leader of the House; Spokesperson for Health; Spokesperson for State Services
4	Hon Max Bradford	Spokesperson for Foreign Affairs; Spokesperson for Defence; Spokesperson for Disarmament and Arms Control; Associate Spokesperson for Finance
5	Hon Tony Ryall	Spokesperson for Police; Spokesperson for Commerce
6	Hon Dr Lockwood Smith	Spokesperson for Labour and Industrial Relations; Spokesperson for State Owned Enterprises; Associate Spokesperson for Finance
7	Gerry Brownlee	Spokesperson for Education
8	Bob Simcock	Spokesperson for Social Services; Spokesperson for Employment; Spokesperson for Work and Income
9	Hon Dr Nick Smith	Spokesperson for Sustainable Development; Spokesperson for Conservation; Spokesperson for the Environment; Spokesperson responsible for Provinces
10	Hon Murray McCully	Spokesperson for Local Government; Spokesperson for Accident Insurance; Spokesperson responsible for Auckland
11	Hon John Luxton	Spokesperson for International Trade Negotiations and Inward Investment; Spokesperson for Economic and Regional Development
12	Rt Hon Wyatt Creech	Shadow Minister of State; Associate Spokesperson for Foreign Affairs; Associate Spokesperson for Revenue; Associate Spokesperson for Disarmament and Arms Control
13	Hon Maurice Williamson	Spokesperson for Tertiary Education; Spokesperson for Information Technology; Spokesperson for Research, Science and Technology
14	Hon David Carter	Spokesperson for Tourism; Spokesperson for Housing
15	John Carter	Senior Whip; Shadow Deputy Leader of the House; Spokesperson for Civil Defence and Emergency Services
16	Alec Neill	Junior Whip; Spokesperson for Communications; Associate Spokesperson for Commerce; Associate Spokesperson for Justice
17	Belinda Vernon	Spokesperson for Transport; Spokesperson for Arts, Culture and Heritage
18	Hon Georgina te Heuheu	Spokesperson for Maori Affairs; Spokesperson for Treaty of Waitangi Negotiations
19	Dr Wayne Mapp	Spokesperson for Justice; Associate Spokesperson for Treaty of Waitangi Negotiations
20	Gavan Herlihy	Spokesperson for Agriculture; Associate Spokesperson for International Trade and Inward Investment
21	Annabel Young	Spokesperson for Revenue; Spokesperson for the Education Review Office; Associate Spokesperson for Education
22	Brian Neeson	Spokesperson for Corrections; Associate Spokesperson for Economic and Regional Development
23	Eric Roy	Spokesperson for Biosecurity and Border Control; Associate Spokesperson for Agriculture; Associate Spokesperson for Fisheries
24	Hon Doug Kidd	Spokesperson for Fisheries (incl Fisheries Commission)
25	Hon Marie Hasler	Spokesperson for Immigration; Spokesperson for Consumer Affairs; Spokesperson for Wholesale & Retail Services
26	Hon Clem Simich	Shadow Attorney-General; Spokesperson for Racing; Political Advisor on Electoral Boundary Changes
27	Warren Kyd	Spokesperson for Small Business & Manufacturing; Spokesperson for Statistics; Spokesperson for Compliance Costs
28	Tony Steel	Spokesperson for Sport, Fitness and Leisure; Associate Spokesperson for Tertiary Education (ETSA and Industry Training)
29	Pansy Wong	Spokesperson for Energy; Spokesperson for Ethnic Affairs; Associate Spokesperson for Commerce
30	Arthur Anae	Spokesperson for Pacific Island Affairs; Associate Spokesperson for Housing
31	Shane Ardern	Spokesperson for Rural Affairs; Spokesperson for Rural New Zealand; Associate Spokesperson for Agriculture
32	Phil Heatley	Spokesperson for Forestry
33	Dr Paul Hutchison	Spokesperson for Crown Research Institutes; Associate Spokesperson for Research, Science and Technology; Associate Spokesperson for Health
34	Simon Power	Spokesperson for Youth Affairs; Associate Spokesperson for Labour; Associate Spokesperson for Sustainable Development; Associate Spokesperson for Conservation; Associate Spokesperson for the Environment
35	Katherine Rich	Spokesperson for Broadcasting; Spokesperson for National Library and Archives
36	Dr Lynda Scott	Spokesperson for Senior Citizens; Spokesperson for Superannuation for Current Retirees; Associate Spokesperson for Health
37	Lindsay Tisch	Spokesperson for Internal Affairs
38	Anne Tolley	Spokesperson for Early Childhood Education; Spokesperson for Women's Affairs
39	Dr Richard Worth	Spokesperson for Veterans' Affairs; Associate Spokesperson for Justice; Associate Shadow Attorney-General

=== December 1999 ===
The first Shipley shadow cabinet was announced after National lost the 1999 election. The list below contains a list of Shipley's spokespeople and their respective roles as announced in December 1999.

Rank	Shadow Minister	Portfolio
1	Rt Hon Jenny Shipley	Leader of the Opposition
2	Rt Hon Wyatt Creech	Deputy Leader of the Opposition; Spokesperson for Health
3	Hon Bill English	Spokesperson for Finance
4	Hon Roger Sowry	Shadow Leader of the House; Spokesperson for State Services; Spokesperson for Transport; Spokesperson for Civil Aviation
5	Hon Max Bradford	Spokesperson for Economic Development; Spokesperson for Labor; Spokesperson for Industrial Relations
6	Hon John Luxton	Spokesperson for International Trade Negotiations; Spokesperson for Industry & Regional Development; Associate Spokesperson for Foreign Affairs
7	Hon Dr Nick Smith	Spokesperson for Education; Spokesperson for ERO; Associate Spokesperson for the Environment/RMA
8	Hon Dr Lockwood Smith	Spokesperson for Commerce; Spokesperson for Communications; Spokesperson for Statistics; Associate Spokesperson for Finance
9	Hon Tony Ryall	Spokesperson for Justice; Spokesperson for Housing; Spokesperson for Timberlands & SILNA
10	Rt Hon Simon Upton	Spokesperson for Foreign Affairs; Spokesperson for Culture and Heritage; Spokesperson for Superannuation
11	Hon Murray McCully	Spokesperson for Local Government; Spokesperson for Infrastructure (including Auckland); Spokesperson for Sport, Fitness and Leisure
12	Hon Maurice Williamson	Spokesperson for Tertiary Education; Spokesperson for Information Technology; Spokesperson for Research, Science and Technology
13	Bob Simcock	Spokesperson for Social Services; Spokesperson for Employment; Spokesperson for Community & Voluntary Sector
14	Hon David Carter	Spokesperson for Tourism; Spokesperson for Biosecurity & Border Security
15	John Carter	Senior Whip; Shadow Deputy Leader of the House; Spokesperson for Civil Defence and Emergency Services
16	Gerry Brownlee	Junior Whip; Spokesperson for ACC; Associate Spokesperson for Labour
17	Belinda Vernon	Spokesperson for Work & Income (excl Employment); Associate Spokesperson for Revenue
18	Hon Georgina te Heuheu	Spokesperson for Maori Affairs; Spokesperson for Treaty of Waitangi Negotiations
19	Dr Wayne Mapp	Spokesperson for Defense; Associate Spokesperson for Justice; Associate Spokesperson for Maori Affairs
20	Gavan Herlihy	Spokesperson for Agriculture
21	Annabel Young	Spokesperson for Revenue
22	Brian Neeson	Spokesperson for Police
23	Eric Roy	Spokesperson for Conservation
24	Hon Doug Kidd	Spokesperson for Fisheries (incl Fisheries Commission)
25	Hon Marie Hasler	Spokesperson for Immigration; Spokesperson for Consumer Affairs; Spokesperson for Wholesale & Retail Services
26	Hon Clem Simich	Shadow Attorney-General; Spokesperson for State Owned Enterprises; Spokesperson for Racing
27	Warren Kyd	Spokesperson for Small Business & Manufacturing; Spokesperson for Compliance Costs; Spokesperson for Foreign Investment
28	Rt Hon Don McKinnon	Spokesperson for Pacific Island Affairs
29	Tony Steel	Spokesperson for Corrections; Associate Spokesperson for Tertiary Education (ETSA and Industry Training); Associate Spokesperson for Sport, Fitness and Leisure
30	Pansy Wong	Spokesperson for Energy; Spokesperson for Ethnic Affairs; Associate Spokesperson for Commerce
31	Phil Heatley	Spokesperson for Forestry (excluding SILNA & Timberlands)
32	Shane Ardern	Spokesperson for Rural Affairs; Associate Spokesperson for Agriculture
33	Dr Paul Hutchison	Spokesperson for CRIs; Associate Spokesperson for Health
34	Simon Power	Spokesperson for Courts; Spokesperson for Youth Affairs
35	Katherine Rich	Spokesperson for Broadcasting; Spokesperson for National Library and Archives
36	Lynda Scott	Spokesperson for Senior Citizens; Associate Spokesperson for Health (Disability Services)
37	Lindsay Tisch	Spokesperson for Internal Affairs
38	Anne Tolley	Spokesperson for Early Childhood Education; Spokesperson for Women's Affairs
39	Dr Richard Worth	Spokesperson for the Environment
