= First Shadow Cabinet of Bill English =

New Zealand shadow cabinet (2001–2003)

The Shadow Cabinet of Bill English formed the official Opposition in the 46th and 47th New Zealand Parliaments while Bill English led the New Zealand National Party, which was the largest party not a member of the Government. English was elected National Party leader unopposed in October 2001. He led the Party to its worst-ever result at the 2002 general election and was replaced as leader by first-term MP Don Brash in October 2003.

== Frontbench team ==
=== August 2002 ===
English reshuffled his party's portfolio allocations after the 2002 general election. With the party comprising only 27 MPs, every person in the National caucus was assigned a portfolio. Notably, first-term MP and former Reserve Bank Governor Don Brash was appointed to the Finance portfolio and ranked third.

Rank	Shadow Minister	Portfolio
1	Hon Bill English	Leader of the Opposition; Spokesperson for Pacific Island Affairs; Spokesperson for the SIS
2	Hon Roger Sowry	Deputy Leader of the Opposition; Spokesperson for Labour and Industrial Relations; Spokesperson for Transport
3	Don Brash	Spokesperson for Finance
4	Gerry Brownlee	Shadow Leader of the House; Spokesperson for Energy; Spokesperson for Local Government; Spokesperson for State-Owned Enterprises
5	Simon Power	Spokesperson for Tertiary Education; Spokesperson for Justice; Spokesperson for Workplace Skills; Spokesperson for Youth Affairs
6	Dr Lynda Scott	Spokesperson for Health; Spokesperson for Senior Citizens; Spokesperson for Food Safety
7	Wayne Mapp	Spokesperson for Foreign Affairs; Spokesperson for Housing; Spokesperson for Disarmament and Arms Control
8	Hon Tony Ryall	Spokesperson for Commerce; Spokesperson for Sentencing; Spokesperson for Police; Spokesperson for Corrections; Spokesperson for Courts
9	Hon David Carter	Spokesperson for Agriculture; Associate Spokesperson for Finance
10	Dr Hon Nick Smith	Spokesperson for Education; Spokesperson for the Environment
11	Katherine Rich	Spokesperson for Social Services and Employment; Spokesperson for Broadcasting; Spokesperson for Arts, Culture and Heritage
12	Hon Murray McCully	Spokesperson for Sport, Fitness and Leisure; Spokesperson for State Services; Spokesperson for Immigration; Spokesperson responsible for Auckland
13	Hon Georgina te Heuheu	Spokesperson for Treaty of Waitangi Negotiations; Spokesperson for Māori Affairs; Spokesperson for Women's Affairs
14	Hon Dr Lockwood Smith	Spokesperson for Trade; Spokesperson for Revenue
15	John Carter	Senior Whip; Spokesperson for Regional Development; Spokesperson for Civil Defence and Emergency Services
16	Lindsay Tisch	Junior Whip; Spokesperson for Racing; Spokesperson for Small Business
17	Hon Clem Simich	Assistant Speaker; Shadow Attorney-General
18	Pansy Wong	Spokesperson for Ethnic Affairs; Spokesperson for Tourism
19	Shane Ardern	Spokesperson for Conservation; Spokesperson for Biosecurity; Associate Spokesperson for Agriculture
20	Phil Heatley	Spokesperson for Fisheries; Associate Spokesperson for Education
21	Paul Hutchison	Spokesperson for Science; Spokesperson for Crown Research Institutes; Spokesperson for Biotechnology; Spokesperson for ACC
22	Richard Worth	Spokesperson for Defence; Spokesperson for Veterans' Affairs
23	Judith Collins	Spokesperson for Internal Affairs; Spokesperson for the National Library; Associate Spokesperson for Health
24	Brian Connell	Spokesperson for Forestry; Associate Spokesperson for Regional Development
25	Sandra Goudie	Spokesperson for Consumer Affairs; Spokesperson for Disability Issues
26	John Key	Associate Spokesperson for Transport; Associate Spokesperson for Commerce
27	Hon Maurice Williamson	Spokesperson for Communications; Spokesperson for Information Technology; Spokesperson for Statistics

=== October 2001 ===
English was elected to the National Party leadership in October 2001, succeeding Jenny Shipley. The list below contains a list of English's shadow ministers and their respective roles as announced October 2001. Of note was English's decision to retain the Finance portfolio, which he had held under Shipley and had indicated he would relinquish as leader. Instead, apparently under pressure for a more gradual transition, David Carter was appointed as an associate spokesperson for finance, and it was suggested that Carter would take the primary portfolio in March or April of the following year. Carter was eventually promoted to Finance spokesperson on 29 January 2002. Later changes to the National lineup included Richard Worth succeeding Max Bradford in Defence and Katherine Rich replacing John Luxton in Tourism, both in June 2002; Bradford and Luxton had announced they would not contest the 2002 election.

Rank	Shadow Minister	Portfolio
1	Hon Bill English	Leader of the Opposition; Shadow Minister of Finance
2	Hon Roger Sowry	Deputy Leader of the Opposition; Shadow Minister of Health
3	Hon Dr Nick Smith	Shadow Minister of Education; Shadow Minister for the Environment
4	Gerry Brownlee	Shadow Leader of the House; Shadow Minister of ACC; Shadow Minister of Superannuation
5	Hon Tony Ryall	Shadow Minister of Commerce; Shadow Minister of Police; Shadow Minister of Regional Development
6	Hon Dr Lockwood Smith	Shadow Minister of Foreign Affairs
7	Hon David Carter	Associate Shadow Minister of Finance
8	Hon Georgina te Heuheu	Shadow Minister of Maori Affairs; Shadow Minister of Treaty Negotiations
9	Wayne Mapp	Shadow Minister of Justice
10	Hon Murray McCully	Shadow Minister of State Owned Enterprises; Shadow Minister of Housing
11	Gavan Herlihy	Shadow Minister of Agriculture
12	Bob Simcock	Shadow Minister of Social Services; Shadow Minister of Employment
13	Lynda Scott	Shadow Minister of Senior Citizens; Shadow Minister of Disabilities; Associate Shadow Minister of Health
14	Simon Power	Shadow Minister of Labour; Shadow Minister for Youth
15	John Carter	Senior Whip; Deputy Shadow Leader of the House; Shadow Minister of Civil Defence and Emergency Services
16	Tony Steel	Junior Whip; Shadow Minister of Sport, Fitness and Leisure
17	Belinda Vernon	Shadow Minister of Transport; Shadow Minister of Arts, Culture and Heritage
18	Hon Marie Hasler	Shadow Minister of Immigration; Shadow Minister of Consumer Affairs
19	Alec Neill	Shadow Minister of Local Government; Shadow Minister of Conservation
20	Annabel Young	Shadow Minister of Revenue
21	Rt Hon Wyatt Creech	Shadow Minister of State; Associate Shadow Minister of Foreign Affairs
22	Rt Hon Jenny Shipley	Shadow Minister of Trade; Shadow Minister of State Services
23	Eric Roy	Assistant Speaker; Shadow Minister of Biosecurity and Border Control
24	Hon John Luxton	Shadow Minister of Communications; Shadow Minister of Tourism
25	Pansy Wong	Shadow Minister of Ethnic Affairs; Shadow Minister of Energy
26	Hon Max Bradford	Shadow Minister of Defense
27	Hon Maurice Williamson	Shadow Minister of Tertiary Education; Shadow Minister of Information Technology; Shadow Minister of Science and Technology
