= Mayor of Rotorua =

- Coat of arms of Rotorua

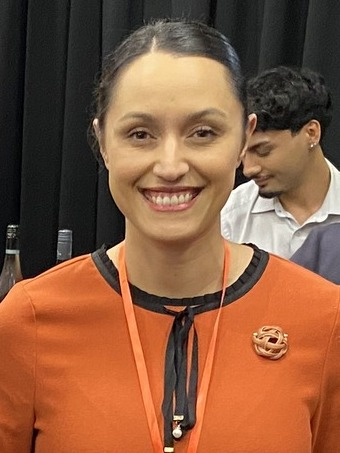
- Incumbent; Tania Tapsell since 21 October 2022
- Style: Mayor
- Appointer: Elected
- Formation: 1923
- Deputy: Sandra Kai Fong
- Salary: $159,679
- Website: https://rotorualakescouncil.nz

The mayor of Rotorua officiates over the Rotorua Lakes District of New Zealand, which is administered by the Rotorua Lakes Council. An elected borough council first came together in February 1923; prior to that, the area had effectively been under government control. Rotorua has had 15 mayors as of 2022, and the current mayor is Tania Tapsell.

== List of office holders ==
	Name	Portrait	Term
1	Cecil Clinkard		1923–1927
2	Thomas McDowell		1927–1928
3	John N. McLean		1928–1929
4	Thomas Jackson		1929–1941
5	Harry D. Dansey		1941–1942
6	Prentice A. Kusabs		1942–1947
7	Alexander Moncur		1947–1953
8	Murray Linton		1953–1971
9	Ray Boord		1971–1977
10	Ray Woolliams		1977–1979
11	John Keaney		1979–1993
12	Grahame Hall		1993–2004
13	Kevin Winters		2004–2013
14	Steve Chadwick		2013–2022
15	Tania Tapsell		2022–present

=== Members of Parliament ===
Four mayors have also been Members of Parliament, and all of them represented the Rotorua electorate (the years in brackets give their term in Parliament):

- Cecil Clinkard (1928–1935)
- Alexander Moncur (1935–1943)
- Ray Boord (1954–1960)
- Steve Chadwick (1999–2011)

== List of deputy mayors ==
^{†} Died in office

Name	Term	Mayor
Claude Anaru	1947–1956	Moncur
Claude Anaru	1947–1956	Linton
Pakake Leonard	fl. 1960–1963	Linton
E. Urquhart	fl. 1966	Linton
Peter Tapsell	fl. 1971	Boord
Paul East	1974–c. 1978	Boord
Paul East	1974–c. 1978	Woolliams
Peter Tapsell	fl. 1981	Keaney
Harry Childs	fl. 1985	Keaney
Johnny Lepper	1986–2002^{[†]}	Keaney
Johnny Lepper	1986–2002^{[†]}	Hall
Trevor Maxwell	2002–2013	Hall
Trevor Maxwell	2002–2013	Winters
Dave Donaldson	2013–2022	Chadwick
Sandra Kai Fong	2022–present	Tapsell
