= Clinkard =

Clinkard is a surname. Notable people with the surname include:

- Archibald Clinkard (died 1696), member of the Parliament of England
- Cecil Clinkard (1862–1941), member of the Parliament of New Zealand
- George William Clinkard (1893–1970), New Zealand public servant and trade commissioner
