= Bright Future =

Bright Future may refer to:

- Bright Future (Empire album), 2021
- Bright Future (Adrianne Lenker album), 2024
- Bright Future (film), a 2003 Japanese drama film written and directed by Kiyoshi Kurosawa
- Bright Future (Iceland), an Icelandic liberal political party founded in 2012
- Bright Future (policy), an innovation policy introduced by the National government in New Zealand in 1999
