= Shadow Cabinet of Bill English =

Shadow Cabinet of Bill English may refer to the following in New Zealand politics:

- First Shadow Cabinet of Bill English, 2001–2003
- Second Shadow Cabinet of Bill English, 2017–2018
