= Murray Linton =

Alister Murray Linton CBE (12 March 1904 – 15 August 1980) was a New Zealand surveyor, local politician, land officer, community leader, horticulturist and broadcaster.

== Biography ==
He was born in Halcombe, New Zealand, on 12 March 1904.

He was a resident of Rotorua, where he was a councillor for six years, then mayor for 18 years from 1953 to 1971. He stood in the 1957 general election in the Rotorua electorate for the National Party, but was defeated by Labour's Ray Boord.

He was appointed a Commander of the Order of the British Empire in the 1965 New Year Honours.

Linton died in Rotorua in 1980, and was buried at Kauae Cemetery in Ngongotahā.

Political offices
Preceded by Alexander Moncur	Mayor of Rotorua; 1953–1971	Succeeded by Ray Boord
