= Tarawera (electorate) =

Tarawera was a New Zealand parliamentary electorate in the Bay of Plenty from 1978 to 1996. It was represented by two members of the National Party.

== Population centres ==
The 1977 electoral redistribution was the most overtly political since the Representation Commission had been established through an amendment to the Representation Act in 1886, initiated by Muldoon's National Government. As part of the 1976 census, a large number of people failed to fill out an electoral re-registration card, and census staff had not been given the authority to insist on the card being completed. This had little practical effect for people on the general roll, but it transferred Māori to the general roll if the card was not handed in. Together with a northward shift of New Zealand's population, this resulted in five new electorates having to be created in the upper part of the North Island. The electoral redistribution was very disruptive, and 22 electorates were abolished, while 27 electorates were newly created (including Tarawera) or re-established. These changes came into effect for the 1978 election.

== History ==
In the 1978 election, the Tarawera electorate was won by Ian McLean. McLean retired at the 1990 election and was replaced by Max Bradford. In 1996, the first mixed-member proportional (MMP) representation election, much of the electorate's area was included in the Rotorua electorate, and Bradford transferred to that electorate.

=== Members of Parliament ===
Key

National

Election	Winner
1978 election	Ian McLean
1981 election	Ian McLean
1984 election	Ian McLean
1987 election	Ian McLean
1990 election	Max Bradford
1993 election	Max Bradford
(Electorate abolished in 1996; see Rotorua)
