= Geoffrey Sim =

New Zealand politician

Geoffrey Fantham Sim QSO (2 April 1911 – 27 March 2002) was a New Zealand politician of the National Party.

== Biography ==
New Zealand Parliament
Years	Term	Electorate	Party
1943–1946	27th	Rotorua	National
1946–1949	28th	Waikato	National
1949–1951	29th	Waikato	National
1951–1954	30th	Waikato	National
1954–1957	31st	Waikato	National
1957–1960	32nd	Waikato	National
1960–1963	33rd	Waikato	National
1963–1966	34th	Piako	National

Sim was born at Ngatapa near Gisborne in 1911. He received his education at Morrinsville, Pukekohe High School, and King's College. At the latter school, he was a lightweight boxing champion. After school, he was a farmer at Waimārama, was involved in felling bush, was a driver in the Onewhero and Thames region, became head shepherd at Crossland Station near Kaipara Harbour, before working as a stock agent in Waiuku.

In World War II, Sim served in the Middle East. At Sidi Rezegh, he lost an eye, an arm, and the use of one leg. While he was in hospital, he became a prisoner of war.

Sim returned to New Zealand in 1943. The National Party nominated him in the Rotorua electorate for the 1943 election, where he was successful. At the end of the parliamentary term in 1946, the Rotorua electorate was abolished, and he successfully contested the Waikato electorate at the 1946 election. He held Waikato until 1963, when that electorate was also abolished. In the 1963 election, he successfully contested the Piako electorate, and retired at the end of the next parliamentary term in 1966. From 1958 to 1960 he was Shadow Minister of Maori Affairs while National was in opposition.

In 1953, Sim was awarded the Queen Elizabeth II Coronation Medal. In the 1978 New Year Honours, he was appointed a Companion of the Queen's Service Order for public services.

Sim died in 2002.

== Notes ==
New Zealand Parliament
Preceded by Alexander Moncur	Member of Parliament for Rotorua; 1943–1946	Vacant Constituency abolished, recreated in 1954 Title next held by Ray Boord
Preceded by Stan Goosman	Member of Parliament for Waikato; 1946–1963	Vacant Constituency abolished, recreated in 1969 Title next held by Lance Adams-Schneider
Preceded by Stan Goosman	Member of Parliament for Piako; 1963–1966	Succeeded by Jack Luxton
