= Alexander Moncur =

New Zealand politician

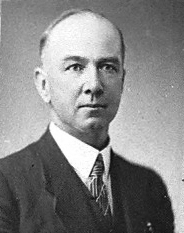

7th Mayor of Rotorua
- In office 1947–1953
- Preceded by: Prentice A. Kusabs
- Succeeded by: Murray Linton

Member of the New Zealand Parliament for Rotorua
- In office 1935–1943
- Preceded by: Cecil Clinkard
- Succeeded by: Geoffrey Sim

Personal details
- Born: 8 March 1888 Melbourne, Victoria, Australia
- Died: 16 June 1976 (aged 88)
- Party: Labour Party

Alexander Francis Moncur (8 March 1888 – 16 June 1976) was a New Zealand politician of the Labour Party.

== Biography ==
New Zealand Parliament
| Years | Term | Electorate | Party |
|---|---|---|---|
| 1935–1938 | 25th | Rotorua | Labour |
| 1938–1943 | 26th | Rotorua | Labour |

Moncur was born in Melbourne in 1888, and arrived in New Zealand in 1906. He was a miner on the West Coast and Waihi, then in 1910 joined the New Zealand Railways as a guard. He was in the Amalgamated Society of Railway Servants, and was Auckland branch president 1912–1921. He worked at Rotorua, and owned a taxi business at Whakatane where he became a Borough Councillor 1925–1935.

He was the unsuccessful Labour candidate for the Bay of Plenty electorate in 1928, running against Kenneth Williams who had been returned unopposed in 1922 and 1925 (and was again unopposed in 1931).

He then ran for the Rotorua electorate in 1931. He represented the Rotorua electorate from 1935 to 1943, when he was defeated by Geoffrey Sim. He was in the RNZAF 1941–1942.

Later, Moncur was the mayor of Rotorua from 1947 to 1953. In 1953, he was awarded the Queen Elizabeth II Coronation Medal.

Moncur died in 1976 and was buried at Maunu Cemetery, Whangārei.

== Notes ==
New Zealand Parliament
| Preceded by Cecil Clinkard | Member of Parliament for Rotorua; 1935–1943 | Succeeded by Geoffrey Sim |
Political offices
| Preceded by Prentice Arthur Kusabs | Mayor of Rotorua; 1947–1953 | Succeeded by Murray Linton |
