= Elsie Smith =

New Zealand nurse and missionary (1881–1968)

Elsie Smith MBE (8 September 1881 – 4 May 1968) was a New Zealand nurse, Anglican deaconess and missionary. She was born in Kingstone Lisle, Berkshire, England, on 8 September 1881. She lived and worked in Whanganui River settlements for 33 years.

In the 1955 Queen's Birthday Honours, Smith was appointed a Member of the Order of the British Empire, recognising her service as a nurse in the Maori Anglican Mission on the Whanganui River.
