= Ian McLean (politician) =

New Zealand politician

Ian McLean QSO

Member of the New Zealand Parliament for Tarawera
- In office 25 November 1978 – 27 October 1990
- Preceded by: New constituency
- Succeeded by: Max Bradford

Personal details
- Born: 16 March 1934 (age 92) Gisborne, New Zealand
- Party: National
- Profession: Economist

Ian McLean QSO (born 16 March 1934) is a New Zealand politician of the National Party. He was a Member of Parliament from 1978 to 1990.

== Early life and family ==
McLean was born in Gisborne on 16 March 1934, the son of Alex McLean. He received his secondary education at Waitaki Boys' High School (1946–1951), where he was dux in 1951, and then studied mathematics at Auckland University College (1952–1956), from where he graduated with a Bachelor of Arts degree in 1957.

In 1957, McLean married Alison Macdonald, and the couple went on to have four children. The same year, he returned to the eastern Bay of Plenty to farm family beef, sheep and dairy farms, before studying economics and becoming an economist in 1971, joining New Zealand's Ministry of Agriculture.

From 1974 to 1976 he led an FAO/UNDP project in Tanzania.

In 1978 while attached to the New Zealand Planning Council, McLean published the book, The future for New Zealand agriculture: economic strategies for the 1980s, coining the phrase 'More Market' which became popular in New Zealand's economic reforms of the 1980s.

== Political career ==
New Zealand Parliament
Years	Term	Electorate	Party
1978–1981	39th	Tarawera	National
1981–1984	40th	Tarawera	National
1984–1987	41st	Tarawera	National
1987–1990	42nd	Tarawera	National

McLean represented the Tarawera electorate from the 1978 general election to 1990, when he retired and was replaced by Max Bradford. At parliament, he was chair of the Public Expenditure Committee.

In 2017 he was quoted in A History of Australasian Economic Thought by Alex Millimow: 'Ian McLean, a New Zealand politician with economics training, colourfully described his country as a market economy where markets are seldom permitted to operate efficiently, together with a centrally-planned economy without a central plan. The allocation of resources is to a large extent determined neither by the market mechanisms nor government decision, but by historical patterns fossilised in institutional procedures.

== Post-parliamentary career ==
On retiring as an MP, McLean chaired the Earthquake Commission and was one of the first in the world to use dynamic financial analysis (DFA) commercially. He later advised on the formation of earthquake insurance schemes in Turkey and Romania under the World Bank.

He led the revival of the LakesWater Quality Society which initiated restoration of the Rotorua lakes.

He was chair of the Mahi Tahi Akoranga Trust which works with Māori inmates in prison. In 2024 he published the book Norman Perry and Mahi Tahi – The Cultural Breakthrough in NZ Prisons.

He led the Review of the Civil Defence Emergency Management Response to the 22 February 2011 Christchurch earthquake. He was a finalist for the 2014 New Zealander of the Year Awards in the Senior category.

== Honours and awards ==
In 1990, McLean received the New Zealand 1990 Commemoration Medal. In the 1991 New Year Honours, he was appointed a Companion of the Queen's Service Order for public services.

New Zealand Parliament
New constituency	Member of Parliament for Tarawera; 1978–1990	Succeeded by Max Bradford
