= Pansy Wong =

New Zealand politician

The Honourable Pansy Wong
- 黃徐毓芳
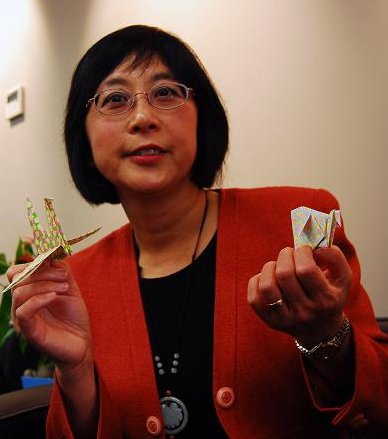

Minister of Ethnic Affairs
- In office 19 November 2008 – 12 November 2010
- Prime Minister: John Key
- Preceded by: Chris Carter
- Succeeded by: Hekia Parata

10th Minister for Women's Affairs
- In office 19 November 2008 – 12 November 2010
- Prime Minister: John Key
- Preceded by: Steve Chadwick
- Succeeded by: Georgina te Heuheu (acting); Hekia Parata

Member of the New Zealand Parliament for Botany
- In office 8 November 2008 – 17 January 2011
- Preceded by: Seat established
- Succeeded by: Jami-Lee Ross
- Majority: 10,872

Member of the New Zealand Parliament for National Party List
- In office 14 October 1996 – 8 November 2008

Personal details
- Born: Tsui Yu Fong 徐毓芳; 1955 (age 70–71) Shanghai, China
- Party: National Party
- Spouse: Sammy Wong
- Occupation: Businessperson

Pansy Yu Fong Wong (Chinese: 黃徐毓芳; Cantonese Yale: Wòhng Chèuih Yūk-fōng; born 1955) is a New Zealand former politician.

Wong was a National Party Member of Parliament in the New Zealand House of Representatives from 1996 to 2011. She was New Zealand's first MP and first Cabinet minister of Asian ethnicity and served as Minister for Ethnic Affairs and Minister of Women's Affairs in the Fifth National Government. Wong resigned from Parliament in January 2011 after allegations of misusing parliamentary travel allowances.

== Early life and family ==
Wong was born in Shanghai and raised in a one-room Hong Kong apartment by her mother, Pui Ching Chui, with her two brothers after her parents chose to leave Maoist China. Her father, Hung Shun Tsui, a seaman, was away most of the time for work. In Hong Kong, Wong took the English name Pansy and attended the Queen Elizabeth School.

The family emigrated to Christchurch, New Zealand, in 1974, when Wong was aged 19. While working in her parents' fish and chip shop, she studied commerce at University of Canterbury and graduated with a Master of Commerce.

She is married to Malaysian-born businessman Sammy Teck Seng Wong, whom she met at university. Sammy Wong was a justice of the peace from 1998 until his retirement in 2020 and had diverse business interests, including shareholder interests in the education, education, and transport industries.

Wong speaks English, Cantonese and Mandarin Chinese.

== Career ==
Wong's early career was in business and accounting, including a period as chief financial controller at Smiths City. Eventually she turned to governance and worked as a professional director with several government appointments.

In 1989, she was chair of the New Zealand Society of Accountants (Canterbury branch). The same year, she contested the Canterbury Regional Council, in the five-member Fitzgerald constituency, on the Christchurch Action team ticket. Of the ten Christchurch Action regional council candidates that year, Wong was the only one to be elected. During her seven years as a councillor, she chaired the finance committee and became known as the "$6 million woman" for overseeing budget cuts of that amount.

By 1991 Wong had been appointed by the Fourth National Government to the governing council of Lincoln University. She was reappointed to a second term, scheduled to end in February 1997, but she retired early upon her election to Parliament. In 1995, she was also appointed to the New Zealand Tourism Board.

== Member of Parliament ==
New Zealand Parliament
Years	Term	Electorate	List	Party
1996–1999	45th	List	26	National
1999–2002	46th	List	11	National
2002–2005	47th	List	10	National
2005–2008	48th	List	20	National
2008–2011	49th	Botany	18	National

Wong was encouraged to stand for Parliament by National MP for Fendalton Philip Burdon. She was selected as a list-only candidate for the National Party ahead of the 1996 general election. Based in Christchurch, she campaigned nationwide amongst Asian communities. Wong was elected as a list MP on 14 October 1996, becoming New Zealand's first ethnically Asian MP. To mark her election, Wong released 130 balloons from the steps of Parliament, symbolising the 130 years since the first Chinese settlers arrived in New Zealand.

In her first term, she was appointed a member of the commerce committee and the justice and law reform committee. Her maiden statement, delivered on 19 March 1997, was described in The Dominion as "a feisty attack on racism against migrants." She criticised the "unfair targeting of Asian immigrants," some of which was instigated by National's new partner in government, the New Zealand First party, but praised what she saw as the increasing acceptance of New Zealand's multiculturalism. Wong rejected suggestions, including from Winston Peters, that she was a "token" representative for the Asian community and later said these events set her ambition of becoming an electorate representative to get a stronger mandate.

She supported Jenny Shipley in the 1997 New Zealand National Party leadership election and was thereafter appointed to shadow the consumer affairs portfolio. Wong took over the sponsorship of the Passive Resistance Sprays Reform Bill, originally in the names of Gail McIntosh and Joy McLauchlan, which would have enabled members of the public to carry items like mace for personal protection; the bill was defeated 52–68 in December 1998. She sought the Christchurch Central candidacy at the 1999 general election, but was unsuccessful. After the election, in which Wong was re-elected as a National Party list MP, she continued as a member of the commerce committee and was appointed spokesperson for energy and ethnic affairs, and associate spokesperson for commerce, in the Shipley shadow cabinet.

Ahead of the 2002 general election, Wong relocated to Auckland to contest the electorate of Auckland Central. She finished second to the incumbent, Judith Tizard. In her third term, Wong became deputy chair of the governance administration committee. She was spokesperson for ethnic affairs and tourism in the English shadow cabinet until 2003. The ethnic affairs portfolio was disestablished under Bill English's successor Don Brash and Wong was made National's liaison with the Asian community and allocated associate spokesperson roles related to education, immigration and revenue. She was returned as a list MP for the fourth time at the 2005 general election and was assigned the spokesperson portfolios in ethnic affairs and accident compensation by new leader John Key.

As National's ethnic affairs spokesperson, Wong was outspoken for Asian communities. She advocated for more lenient immigration rules, like easier language tests, to support a greater number of Asian migrants into New Zealand. She dismissed the Labour government's 2002 apology to the Chinese community for the historic poll tax as staged and paternalistic, although was criticised for upsetting the descendants of those affected who had worked to secure the apology. Wong, who was a proponent of Asian integration within New Zealand and did not believe there should be a stand-alone ethnic affairs ministry, continued to face political attacks on the basis of her ethnicity and accent.

Wong won the new electorate of Botany in the 2008 general election. Wong's decision to change to Botany was based partly on the fact that 33% of the Botany electorate was Asian.

== Minister in the Fifth National Government ==
After the 2008 general election, Wong was appointed Minister for Ethnic Affairs, Minister of Women's Affairs, Associate Minister for ACC, and Associate Minister for Energy and Resources in the Fifth National Government. She said her appointment as New Zealand's first Asian Cabinet minister showed "New Zealand is a tolerant country where anyone can be accepted and succeed." In June 2009 she was additionally appointed an associate minister in the disability issues portfolio. While minister, Wong took ten overseas trips on ministerial business.

Wong's ministerial career ended in scandal when it was claimed she improperly used her status to help her husband's business interests while travelling in China. She resigned her positions when it emerged her husband, Sammy Wong, had accompanied her on ministerial visits overseas to conduct his business activities and used the address of her electoral office as the registered address for his businesses. An investigation concluded there was no systemic abuse of MPs' travel entitlements but ordered some costs to be repaid by the Wongs. The events led to a review and change to the entitlements. The Auditor-General considered investigating, but initially declined. However, an audit investigation into the Wongs was launched in 2011 which recommended further repayments, as well as law changes regarding MPs' expenses and entitlements, be made.

On 14 December 2010, Wong announced she would also resign from Parliament, effective from mid-January. She gave her valedictory statement on the same day. Jami-Lee Ross replaced her in the 2011 Botany by-election. She was succeeded in her ministerial portfolios by Hekia Parata.

== Awards and honours ==
In 1993, Wong was awarded the New Zealand Suffrage Centennial Medal.

On 15 September 2011 Wong was granted the right to retain the title of "the Honourable" for her lifetime in recognition of her term as a member of the Executive Council.

New Zealand Parliament
New constituency	Member of Parliament for Botany; 2008–2011	Succeeded by Jami-Lee Ross
Political offices
Preceded by Chris Carter	Minister of Ethnic Affairs; 2008–2010	Succeeded by Hekia Parata
Preceded by Steve Chadwick	Minister of Women's Affairs; 2008–2010	Succeeded by Hekia Parata
