= Steve Chadwick =

New Zealand politician (born 1948)

The Honourable Steve Chadwick QSO
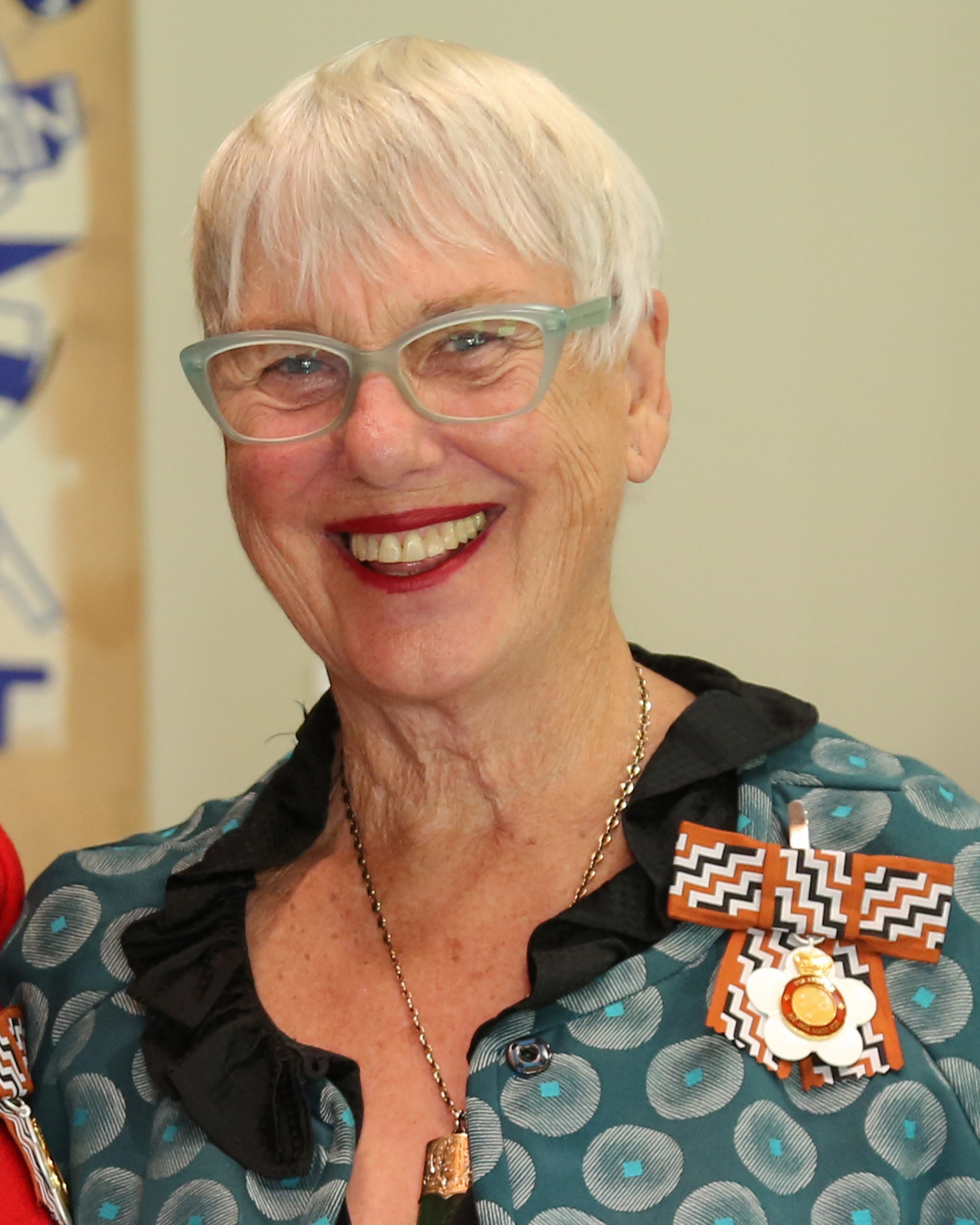
- Chadwick in 2022

14th Mayor of Rotorua
- In office 12 October 2013 – 2022
- Preceded by: Kevin Winters
- Succeeded by: Tania Tapsell

9th Minister of Conservation
- In office 31 October 2007 – 19 November 2008
- Prime Minister: Helen Clark
- Preceded by: Chris Carter
- Succeeded by: Tim Groser

9th Minister for Women's Affairs
- In office 5 November 2007 – 19 November 2008
- Prime Minister: Helen Clark
- Preceded by: Lianne Dalziel
- Succeeded by: Pansy Wong

Member of the New Zealand Parliament for Rotorua
- In office 1999–2008
- Preceded by: Max Bradford
- Succeeded by: Todd McClay

Member of the New Zealand Parliament for Labour Party list
- In office 2008–2011

Personal details
- Born: Stephanie Anne Frizzell; 15 December 1948 (age 77) Hastings, New Zealand
- Party: Labour
- Spouse: John Te Manihera Chadwick (m. 1968; died 2017)
- Relations: Dick Frizzell (brother); Otis Frizzell (nephew)
- Committees: Officers of Parliament Committee
- Website: www.stevechadwick.co.nz

Stephanie Anne "Steve" Chadwick QSO (née Frizzell, born 15 December 1948) is a New Zealand politician. She served as mayor of Rotorua from 2013 to 2022. She previously held the positions of Minister of Conservation, Women's Affairs, and Associate Health in the Fifth Labour Government of New Zealand.

== Early life ==
Born Stephanie Frizzell in Hastings, New Zealand, Chadwick is the sister of painter Dick Frizzell. She attended Karamu High School, then did nursing training in Wellington. She married lawyer John Te Manihera Chadwick in 1968, and the couple went on to have three children. After holding many roles in the health sector, including a term from 1976 to 1986 as union representative for the New Zealand Nurses Association, Steve Chadwick was elected to the Rotorua District Council in 1996.

== Member of Parliament ==
New Zealand Parliament
Years	Term	Electorate	List	Party
1999–2002	46th	Rotorua	43	Labour
2002–2005	47th	Rotorua	34	Labour
2005–2008	48th	Rotorua	33	Labour
2008–2011	49th	List	30	Labour

In the 1999 election, Chadwick stood as the Labour Party candidate for the Rotorua seat, and defeated incumbent National Party MP Max Bradford. At the 2005 election she was narrowly returned to Parliament by 662 or 2.2% more votes than her opponent.

In 2006, Chadwick's Shop Trading Hours Act Repeal (Easter Trading) Amendment Bill was drawn from the member's ballot. The bill passed its first reading and was sent to select committee, but was narrowly defeated at the second reading, 64 to 57.

In 2007, she was appointed to Cabinet as Minister of Conservation and Women's Affairs, as well as becoming an Associate Minister of Health.

In the 2008 general election, Chadwick lost her seat to National's Todd McClay, whose margin was over 5000. Chadwick's loss was predicted by some commentators due to boundary changes which incorporated more rural areas into the electorate. However, due to Chadwick's list place of 30 she was able to return to parliament.

In 2010, Chadwick attempted to introduce a bill to Parliament to partially liberalise abortion law. This bill was defeated at the caucus stage and was not brought before Parliament.

Chadwick failed to regain her seat in the 2011 election, losing to Todd McClay by a margin of more than 7,000 votes. On 27 November 2011 she announced that she would be retiring from politics.

As a cabinet minister, Chadwick was entitled to the title of The Honourable and became The Hon. Mrs Stephanie (Steve) Chadwick which is a title she was granted for the rest of her life after leaving parliament.

== Mayor of Rotorua ==
Chadwick contested the Rotorua mayoralty in the local elections of that year, challenging sitting mayor Kevin Winters. Chadwick defeated Winters and three other candidates, receiving more than 11,000 votes from a total 19,596 votes cast.

At the 2016 local-body elections, Chadwick again ran for mayor, defeating six other candidates, receiving 8,990 of a total 21,408 votes cast

Chadwick's husband, John Chadwick, died in Rotorua on 26 May 2017.

In 2020, Chadwick announced a zero percent rates increase in the Rotorua Lakes Council's 2020/2021 annual plan to cushion the financial blow of the COVID-19 pandemic, which had severely impacted the district's tourism industry.

Chadwick did not stand for re-election as mayor in the 2022 elections.

In the 2022 New Year Honours, Chadwick was appointed a Companion of the Queen's Service Order, for services to local government and as a Member of Parliament.

== Post-mayoral activities ==
In 2025, Chadwick was one of 10 women MPs from across the political spectrum to serve on the People's Select Committee, a committee organised by former National MP Marilyn Waring to take submissions on pay equity changes made by the Sixth National Government of New Zealand.

New Zealand Parliament
Preceded by Max Bradford	Member of Parliament for Rotorua; 1999–2008	Succeeded by Todd McClay
Political offices
Preceded by Lianne Dalziel	Minister for Women's Affairs; 2007–2008	Succeeded by Pansy Wong
Preceded by Chris Carter	Minister Conservation; 2007–2008	Succeeded by Tim Groser
Preceded by Kevin Winters	Mayor of Rotorua; 2013–2022	Succeeded by Tania Tapsell
Party political offices
Preceded by Darren Hughes	Senior Whip of the Labour Party (acting); 2011	Succeeded by Rick Barker
