= Harry Lapwood =

New Zealand politician (1915–2007)

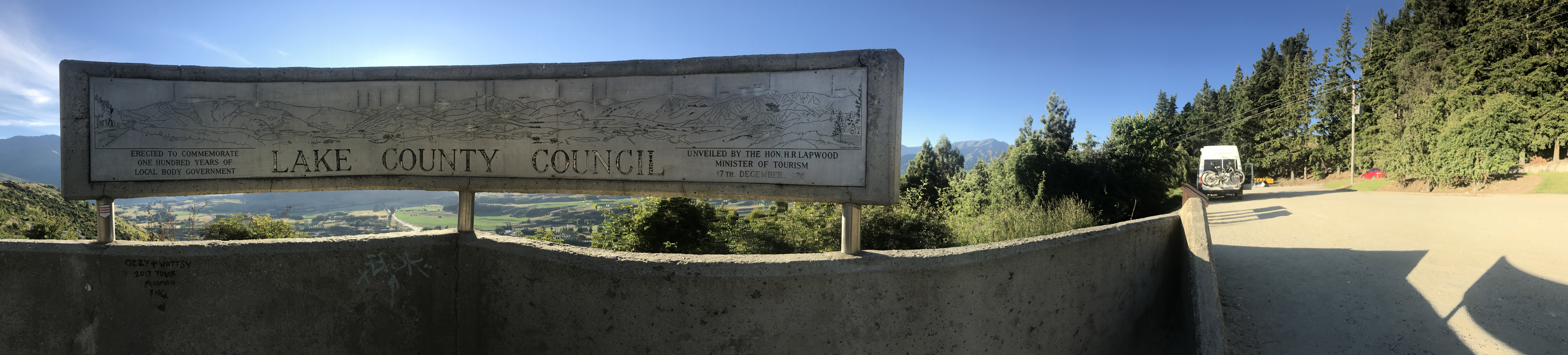
Lake County Council sign unveiled by Lapwood in 1976

Henry Robert Lapwood OBE (1 November 1915 – 26 April 2007) was a New Zealand soldier and a National Party politician.

== Biography ==
New Zealand Parliament
Years	Term	Electorate	Party
1960–1963	33rd	Rotorua	National
1963–1966	34th	Rotorua	National
1966–1969	35th	Rotorua	National
1969–1972	36th	Rotorua	National
1972–1975	37th	Rotorua	National
1975–1978	38th	Rotorua	National

Born at Tuakau, just south of Auckland, Lapwood was raised by an uncle and aunt, his mother having died when he was four and his father when he was ten. He attended Tuakau and Dilworth Schools in Auckland, before working first on a dairy farm in Awakeri, and later as a police officer in Invercargill. At the start of the Second World War in 1939 he joined the New Zealand Army and was a warrant officer class 1 in the 2nd Division. On 26 June 1942, he was appointed the Regimental Sergeant Major of 18 New Zealand Armoured Regiment. The next day, during fighting at Minqar Qaim leading up to the First Battle of El Alamein, he was wounded by enemy artillery fire, resulting in the loss of use of one arm.

He moved to Rotorua in 1947 with his wife Cath (née Gow) and purchased a grocery business. In 1960, he stood as the National Party candidate for the Rotorua electorate, which to his surprise he won, defeating Labour incumbent Ray Boord. Lapwood represented Rotorua for six terms from 1960 until his retirement in 1978. He was senior whip from 1970 to 1974, and was known for having the loudest voice in Parliament, attributed to his previous role as RSM during the war. He was Minister of Tourism and Minister in charge of Publicity and of the Government Printing Office from 1975 to 1978, in the Muldoon government.

In 1977, Lapwood received the Queen Elizabeth II Silver Jubilee Medal, and in 1990, he was awarded the New Zealand 1990 Commemoration Medal. In the 1992 New Year Honours, Lapwood was appointed an Officer of the Order of the British Empire, for public services.

His wife Cath died in 2003. Lapwood died on 26 April 2007 after a short illness, and was survived by five daughters.

== Notes ==
New Zealand Parliament
Preceded by Ray Boord	Member of Parliament for Rotorua; 1960–1978	Succeeded by Paul East
