= Ray Boord =

New Zealand politician

The Honourable Ray Boord QSO

9th Mayor of Rotorua
- In office 9 October 1971 – 8 October 1977
- Deputy: Peter Tapsell
- Preceded by: Murray Linton
- Succeeded by: Ray Woolliams

39th Minister of Customs
- In office 12 December 1957 – 12 December 1960
- Prime Minister: Walter Nash
- Preceded by: Eric Halstead
- Succeeded by: Jack Marshall

7th Minister of Broadcasting
- In office 12 December 1957 – 12 December 1960
- Prime Minister: Walter Nash
- Preceded by: Ronald Algie
- Succeeded by: Arthur Kinsella

Member of the New Zealand Parliament for Rotorua
- In office 13 November 1954 – 26 November 1960
- Preceded by: In abeyance
- Succeeded by: Harry Lapwood

Personal details
- Born: 4 February 1908 Rotorua, New Zealand
- Died: 29 April 1982 (aged 74) Rotorua, New Zealand
- Party: Labour

Military service
- Allegiance: New Zealand Army
- Years of service: 1940–1945
- Rank: Lieutenant Colonel
- Battles/wars: World War II

Raymond Boord QSO (4 February 1908 – 29 April 1982) was a New Zealand politician of the Labour Party.

== Biography ==
=== Early life and career ===
Boord was born in Rotorua in 1908 to Francis Moss Boord and Agnes Jane Boord. His grandfather was one of the first European settlers in Rotorua, establishing a farm in the 1860s. Boord was educated initially at Rotorua Boys' High School and later at Feilding Agricultural High School, where he became prominent in debating and was dux of the school. He was also a talented sportsman representing Feilding Agricultural at both rugby and cricket. He then became a sheep farmer for 13 years.

He left New Zealand in May 1940 after enlisting in the 2nd New Zealand Expeditionary Force for service in the Second World War. Posted to the 21st Battalion, he served in Greece and Egypt before being promoted to lieutenant first class in February 1942, then seeing action in the Second Battle of El Alamein. He was wounded in action on 26 March 1943 and was also mentioned in dispatches (MiD). On 31 January 1945 he was promoted to the temporary rank of major before being promoted with the full rank on 19 May 1945 and was second in command of the 24th Battalion. On 5 July 1945 he was made commanding officer of the 24th Battalion and promoted to the rank of lieutenant-colonel. He returned to New Zealand in February 1946.

=== Member of Parliament ===
New Zealand Parliament
Years	Term	Electorate	Party
1954–1957	31st	Rotorua	Labour
1957–1960	32nd	Rotorua	Labour

Boord stood for election to the New Zealand House of Representatives for the Labour Party in Bay of Plenty in 1946, but was unsuccessful. In June 1947 he was appointed assistant national secretary of the Labour Party before becoming Labour's research officer.

In 1953, the electorate of Waimarino was abolished following an electoral redistribution and largely absorbed into Rotorua. Boord won the candidate selection for the "new" seat of Rotorua, defeating Paddy Kearins. He won the seat and represented the Rotorua electorate from 1954 to 1960, when he was defeated by National's Harry Lapwood.

He was a Cabinet minister under Walter Nash, and was Minister of Customs and Minister of Publicity (1957–1960) in the Second Labour Government. He was also Minister of Broadcasting and oversaw the introduction of television into New Zealand. In February 1959 the first experimental television transmissions were initiated, but Boord ended them after just two weeks over concerns that they were generating too much interest form the public.

Boord was expecting his appointments as Minister of Publicity and Broadcasting, due to his experience as a Labour Party publicity officer, but questioned Nash as to his selection as Minister of Customs. When asking what his duties would be (Nash had previously held the role from 1935 to 1949) Nash simply replied "Make rules and stick to them". Boord later believed that Nash knew that he would have to reintroduce import licensing and wanted a minister who would not bend the rules.

As a remedy for the balance of payments crisis the Labour government inherited, Boord introduced comprehensive import controls in 1958. The extremely detailed import licensing schedules were periodically worked out, specifying how much barley, chaff, flour, rennet and saccharine could be imported into New Zealand. The idea was conceived at a meeting of the Cabinet Committee on Economic Policy on 20 December 1957, chaired by Arnold Nordmeyer, (also attended by Jerry Skinner, Phil Holloway, Henry Lang and Bill Sutch – but not Nash) where it was decided that import controls would be the most effective way of dealing with the problem.

Following the overwhelming unpopularity of the 1958 "Black Budget" Boord eased up on import controls in the 1960 budget in an attempt to regain popularity ahead of the general election later that year. The ploy did not work and the government was defeated in the December 1960 election at which Boord also lost his own seat.

=== Post parliament ===
After exiting parliament he returned to working his sheep farm. Boord remained politically involved and was an extra-parliamentary confidante of Nash. Nash even went as far as to admit in a letter to Boord that his hearing and memory had deteriorated. Boord was also one of the first people to identify Norman Kirk (then only a first-term backbencher) as a potential future leader.

Boord was elected as a member of both the Bay of Plenty Harbour Board and Rotorua Borough Council. He was hospitalised after he crashed his car on into a power pole near Okere on 24 May 1971 causing bruising and a concussion. Later he served as Mayor of Rotorua from 1971 to 1977. As mayor he received Queen Elizabeth II on behalf of Rotorua during the 1974 Royal Tour.

Boord was appointed a Companion of the Queen's Service Order for public services in the 1975 Queen's Birthday Honours, and in 1977 he was awarded the Queen Elizabeth II Silver Jubilee Medal.

=== Later life and death ===
Boord established the Francis Moss Boord Charitable Trust, in memory of his father, to provide funds for charitable purposes in areas including the development of public reserves and domains.

Boord died in Rotorua on 29 April 1982, and was buried at Kauae Cemetery in Ngongotahā on 5 May 1982. (Note: The cemetery search does not produce a specific URL. Select 'online cemetery search' (the blue button), accept the popup box, select 'Cemeteries' in the side-bar under 'Modules', select 'Name search' in the footer, and search for "Boord Raymond".)

== Honorific eponym ==
Ray Boord Park in the Rotorua suburb of Westbrook is named after Boord.

== Notes ==
New Zealand Parliament
Vacant Constituency recreated after abolition in 1946 Title last held by Geoffrey Sim	Member of Parliament for Rotorua; 1954–1960	Succeeded by Harry Lapwood
Political offices
Preceded by Eric Halstead	Minister of Customs; 1957–1960	Succeeded by Jack Marshall
Preceded by Ronald Algie	Minister of Broadcasting; 1957–1960	Succeeded by Arthur Kinsella
Preceded by Murray Linton	Mayor of Rotorua; 1971–1977	Succeeded by Ray Woolliams
