= Todd McClay =

New Zealand politician (born 1968)

The Honourable Todd McClay MP
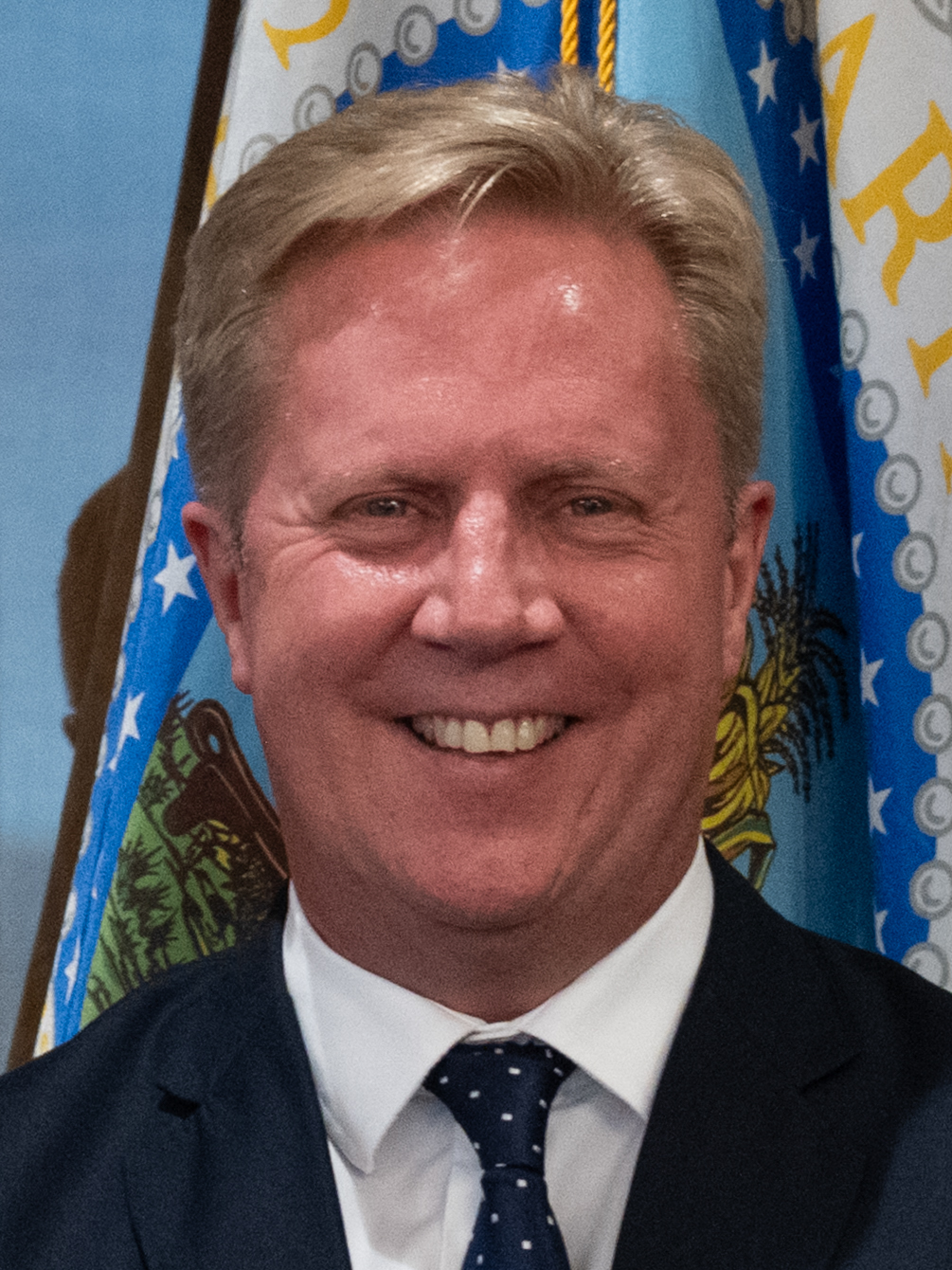
- McClay in 2025

Minister for Trade and Investment Minister of Agriculture Minister of Forestry
- Incumbent
- Assumed office 27 November 2023
- Prime Minister: Christopher Luxon
- Preceded by: Damien O'Connor
- In office 14 December 2015 – 26 October 2017
- Prime Minister: John Key; Bill English
- Preceded by: Tim Groser
- Succeeded by: David Parker (as Minister for Trade and Export Growth)

Minister of State Owned Enterprises
- In office 8 October 2014 – 26 October 2017
- Prime Minister: John Key; Bill English
- Preceded by: Tony Ryall
- Succeeded by: Winston Peters

3rd Minister of Revenue
- In office 10 June 2013 – 14 December 2015
- Prime Minister: John Key
- Preceded by: Peter Dunne
- Succeeded by: Michael Woodhouse

Member of the New Zealand Parliament for Rotorua
- Incumbent
- Assumed office 8 December 2008
- Preceded by: Steve Chadwick
- Majority: 8,923

Personal details
- Born: 22 November 1968 (age 57) Rotorua, Bay of Plenty, New Zealand
- Party: National
- Relations: Roger McClay (father)
- Occupation: Member of Parliament for Rotorua
- Website: http://www.toddmcclay.co.nz/

Todd Michael McClay (born 22 November 1968) is a New Zealand politician and former ambassador. He is the Member of Parliament for Rotorua. He was previously an ambassador for the Cook Islands and Niue to the European Union.

== Early life ==
McClay was born in Rotorua in 1968. The son of former National MP Roger McClay, he was educated at Tauhara College in Taupō, Wesley College in Auckland and Wellington Polytechnic in Wellington. He gained a bachelor's degree in Politics.

== European Union diplomatic career ==
McClay worked in the European Parliament as Head of Staff to Lord Plumb, President of the European Parliament and Leader of the British Conservatives in the European Parliament. He has also been active in European government affairs and lobbying and was a founder and CEO of a now dissolved company Political Relationship Management. McClay has been active in Pacific Islands, European and New Zealand diplomacy and politics since 1992, and was the Cook Islands' first accredited diplomat outside of the Pacific region. He remains the youngest-ever appointed Head of Mission to the European Union.

In 2000 the Cook Islands joined the Cotonou Agreement between the EU and African, Caribbean and Pacific states (ACP) and he was appointed as special representative of the Cook Islands. In 2002 the Cook Islands government upgraded its representation to the level of diplomatic mission, at which time McClay was appointed Ambassador to the EU. He has represented the Cook Islands at many international meetings and conferences, including the WTO, FAO, ACP, EU and UN.

== Member of Parliament ==
=== First term, 2008–2011 ===
In 2008, McClay was selected as the National Party candidate to stand for the Rotorua electorate in the 2008 New Zealand general election, running against incumbent Labour MP Steve Chadwick. McClay won the seat of Rotorua on election night with a majority of 5,065 (15.43%). He was sworn in as a Member of Parliament on 8 December 2008.

In 2009 his Shop Trading Hours Act 1990 Repeal (Easter Sunday Local Choice) Amendment Bill was drawn from the ballot. The bill would have allowed local authorities to permit shops to open on Easter Sunday – something currently prohibited in most of New Zealand. The bill was narrowly defeated at its first reading.

=== Second term, 2011–2014 ===
In 2011, McClay was reelected as the Member of Parliament for Rotorua increasing his majority to 7,357 votes.

In late June 2012, McClay announced his intention to bring a bill before Parliament to prohibit the display of gang insignia in all government premises, schools and hospitals in New Zealand. Modeled on the Whanganui Gang Insignia Act, McClay's announcement was met with strong public support. The Bill received Royal Assent on 12 August 2013 and became law the day after.

On 30 August 2012, McClay voted against the Marriage (Definition of Marriage) Amendment Bill, a bill allowing same-sex couples to marry in New Zealand.

In 2013 he was appointed Minister of Revenue and Associate Minister of Health, serving outside of Cabinet.

In January 2014, he was appointed Associate Minister for Tourism.

=== Third term, 2014–2017 ===
In September 2014, McClay was again elected as Member of Parliament for Rotorua with an increased majority of 7,418, after beating Labour candidate and former TV weatherman, Tāmati Coffey.

Following the 2014 election, McClay was promoted to Cabinet retaining his position as Minister of Revenue, while picking up the portfolios of State-Owned Enterprises, Associate Minister of Foreign Affairs and Associate Minister of Trade.

Following the resignation of former Trade Minister Tim Groser, McClay became Minister of Trade on 14 December 2015. He retained State Owned Enterprises and Associate Foreign Affairs, while handing over Inland Revenue to Michael Woodhouse.

In late July 2016, McClay was rebuked by Prime Minister John Key for downplaying concerns that China would retaliate if New Zealand undertook an investigation of Chinese steel dumping.

In 2017, McClay represented his party in Beijing before a dialogue organised by the International Liaison Department of the Chinese Communist Party (CCP). McClay also referred to the Xinjiang re-education camps as "vocational training centers", the term used by the Chinese government.

=== Fourth term, 2017–2020 ===
During the 2017 general election, McClay retained Rotorua for National by a margin of 7,901 votes.

In late August 2019, former National MP Jami-Lee Ross alleged that McClay had helped to facilitate a NZ$150,000 to the National Party in his capacity as Trade Minister in 2016 from a company owned by Chinese millionaire Lin Lang. McClay and the National Party have denied these allegations.

=== Fifth term, 2020–2023 ===
During the 2020 general election, McClay retained his seat in Rotorua by a final margin of 825 votes.

McClay was one of only eight MPs to vote against the Conversion Practices Prohibition Legislation Act 2022. He voted against it at its first reading (which then-party-leader Judith Collins instructed her MPs to do), for it at its second reading, and against it at its third and final reading.

Following a reshuffle in party leader Christopher Luxon's shadow cabinet on 19 January 2023, McClay was given the new Hunting and Fishing portfolio. He retained his 16th place ranking within Luxon's shadow cabinet.

Following the announcement of Todd Muller's retirement from Parliament on 17 March 2023, McClay was given National's Agriculture portfolio and promoted to 12th place ranking within Luxon's shadow cabinet.

=== Sixth term, 2023–2026 ===
During the 2023 general election, McClay retained his seat in Rotorua by an increased margin of 8,923 votes.

In late November 2023, McClay was sworn in as a Minister taking responsibility of the Agriculture, Forestry, Hunting and Fishing, and Trade portfolios. He was also appointed as the Associate Minister of Foreign Affairs.

In mid December 2023, McClay accepted the role of Vice-Chair for the World Trade Organization's 13th Ministerial Conference at Abu Dhabi in 2024.

On 11 June 2024, McClay confirmed that the Government would exclude agriculture from the NZ emissions trading scheme (ETS). On 14 June, McClay announced that the Government would cancel the annual service charges for forestry under the country's emissions trading scheme, which amounts to NZ$30.25 per hectare.

On 30 July 2024, McClay apologised after telling Green Party MP Ricardo Menéndez March "you're not in Mexico now, we don't do things like that here" during a parliamentary sitting. March raised the matter with Speaker Gerry Brownlee, who ordered McClay to withdraw and apologise. On 31 July, Prime Minister Christopher Luxon described McClay's remarks as inappropriate and said he would discuss the matter with McClay. Opposition leader Chris Hipkins described McClay's remarks as offensive towards migrant New Zealanders and questioned his suitability to remain as trade minister.

As Trade Minister, McClay played a role in New Zealand securing free trade agreements with the United Arab Emirates in late September 2024 and the six-member Gulf Cooperation Council in late October 2024. These free trade agreements lifted duties on the vast majority of New Zealand's exports to these Gulf Arab states over the next three to ten years. On 13 January 2025, McClay signed the comprehensive economic partnership agreement with the United Arab Emirates, cutting tariffs on 98.5% of New Zealand exports to that country.

In early August 2025, McClay travelled to Thailand and Indonesia to strengthen bilateral trade relations with the two Southeast Asian countries. Between 4 and 6 August, McClay visited Thailand where he met with Thai Foreign Minister Maris Sangiampongsa to discuss bilateral cooperation in agricultural technology and tertiary education. On 7 August, McClay and Indonesian Agriculture Minister Amran Sulaiman signed a new bilateral trade agreement to boost agricultural trade and cooperation between New Zealand and Indonesia.

On 5 March 2026, McClay and the Chilean Minister of Agriculture Ignacia Fernández Gatica signed a four-year bilateral agricultural agreement. In mid-March 2026, McClay hosted Irish Minister of State Noel Grealish during his visit to New Zealand. The two leaders signed an agricultural climate research partnership agreement.

On 27 April 2026, McClay signed the New Zealand–India Free Trade Agreement with the Indian Commerce and Industry Minister Piyush Goyal in New Delhi.

=== Seventh term, 2026–present ===
During the 2026 New Zealand general election, McClay contested the Rotorua electorate for National. He was ranked tenth on the National Party list. Based on preliminary results, McClay retained Rotorua by a large margin of 5,301 votes.

New Zealand Parliament
Years	Term	Electorate	List	Party
2008–2011	49th	Rotorua	54	National
2011–2014	50th	Rotorua	47	National
2014–2017	51st	Rotorua	23	National
2017–2020	52nd	Rotorua	14	National
2020–2023	53rd	Rotorua	6	National
2023–2026	54th	Rotorua	12	National
2026–present	55th	Rotorua	10	National

== Personal life ==
Todd McClay lives in Rotorua with his partner Anna Lillis and their family. He has four adult children from a previous relationship. McClay and Lillis became engaged in 2026.

New Zealand Parliament
Preceded by Steve Chadwick	Member of Parliament for Rotorua; 2008–present	Incumbent
