= 1955 Birthday Honours (New Zealand) =

Award list for New Zealand

The 1955 Queen's Birthday Honours in New Zealand, celebrating the official birthday of Elizabeth II, were appointments made by the Queen on the advice of the New Zealand government to various orders and honours to reward and highlight good works by New Zealanders. They were announced on 9 June 1955.

The recipients of honours are displayed here as they were styled before their new honour.

== Knight Bachelor ==
- Mr Justice Arthur Tyndall CMG – judge of the Court of Arbitration.

== Order of the Bath ==
=== Companion (CB) ===
Military division

- Commodore Sir Charles Edward Madden Bt ADC – Royal Navy (lately Chief of Naval Staff, Royal New Zealand Navy).

== Order of Saint Michael and Saint George ==
=== Companion (CMG) ===
- George Thomas Bolt – chairman of the Public Service Commission.
- Stronach Paterson – of Wellington. For public services.

== Order of the British Empire ==
=== Knight Commander (KBE) ===
Civil division

- The Honourable Walter James Broadfoot – lately Postmaster-General and Minister of Telegraphs.
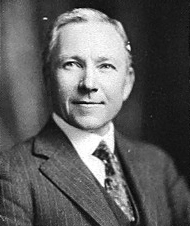
Sir Walter Broadfoot

=== Commander (CBE) ===
Civil division

- George William Clinkard JP. For services as secretary of the Department of Industries and Commerce and as a member of the Board of Trade.
- Alexander Robert Entrican – Director of Forestry.
- Andrew Sinclair Sutherland. For public services.
- James Leslie Allan Will MB ChB – of Christchurch; an orthopaedic surgeon.

Military division

- Group Captain Francis Ross Dix OBE – Royal New Zealand Air Force.

=== Officer (OBE) ===
Civil division

- Kenneth Curtis Aekins – of Mount Roskill. For services to the community.
- Walter Edwin Bate – of Hastings. For services to local government.
- Victoria Amohau Bennett – a chieftainess of the Te Āti Awa tribe. For services to the Māori people.
- Thomas Murray Charters – of Christchurch. For services to local government and in connection with social welfare movements.
- Roberts Mathew Firth – Tourist Commissioner and Her Majesty's consul-general for New Zealand at San Francisco.
- Frederick Willie Freeman – a civil engineer of Christchurch.
- John Norman Millard. For services to education and sport, especially rugby football.
- The Reverend Alexander Thomas Thompson. For services to the community, especially in connection with the British and Foreign Bible Society and St Andrew's Boys' College, Christchurch.
- Henry Toogood – a consulting engineer of Wellington.

Military division

- Lieutenant-Colonel John Bryden Harrison – New Zealand Regiment (Regular Force).
- Lieutenant-Colonel Gordon Anderson Lindell DSO ED – Royal New Zealand Engineers (Territorial Force).
- Wing Commander Percival Patrick O'Brien – Royal New Zealand Air Force.
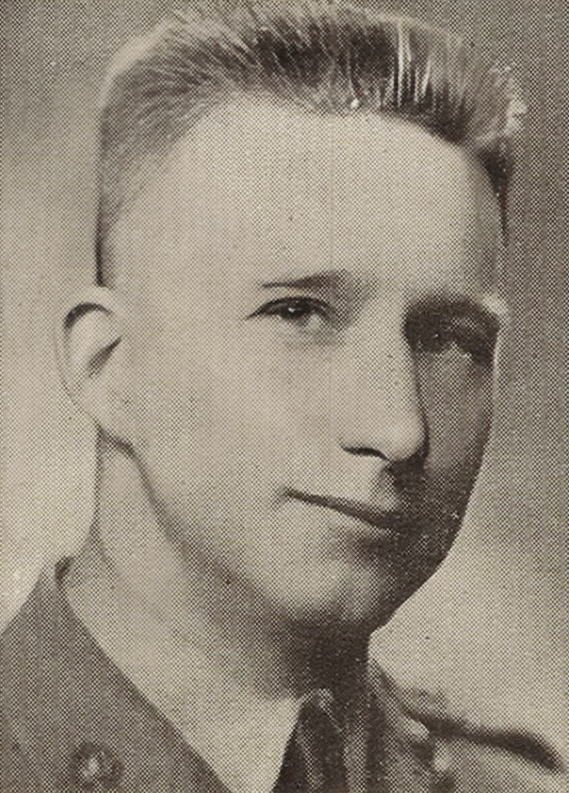
Gordon Lindell

=== Member (MBE) ===
Civil division

- Henry Albert Anderson. For services to local government, especially as mayor of Mount Albert.
- Charles Frederick Bennett JP – of Auckland. For social welfare services.
- Elfie Sarah Masters Boyle – president of the New Zealand Private Hospitals Association.
- Mabel Alice Buckley – of Devonport, Auckland. For social welfare services.
- Charles Collins – of Wellington; city organist and treasurer of the City Council.
- Catherine Wishart Doctor. For social welfare services, especially as president of the New Zealand Free Kindergarten Union and of the Wellington Association.
- Olive Marion Fairbairn – of Dunedin. For social welfare services.
- John Farrell – of Auckland. For services to the stage.
- Lilian Ada Hill. For services as a public health nurse and nurse inspector.
- Sidney Edward Langstone JP. For services to the St John Ambulance Association at Auckland.
- Jessie Iris Martin. For services to nursing, and especially as matron of the Cook Hospital, Gisborne.
- Gladys Irene McDonald – of Dunedin. For social welfare services.
- Jane McDougal – of Wanganui. For social welfare services.
- Nellie Eileen O'Callaghan ARRC. For services in connection with the Blinded Servicemen's Trust Board and as matron of the Rawhiti Surgical Hospital, Auckland.
- Ernest John Osborne – of Birkenhead. For service to local government.
- The Reverend William John Robertson – chaplain to the Presbyterian Social Service Association of Southland.
- Elsie Smith – a nurse in the Maori Anglican Mission, Koriniti, Whanganui River, for 25 years.
- Roy Hunter Stevenson – of Dunedin. For social welfare services.
- Roderick Syme – of Hawera. For services as an agricultural instructor and in fostering mountaineering.
- Herbert Edward Walters – of Kerikeri. For services to local government and in connection with land development.
- Alfred Graeme Cooke Yarborough. For services to local government in Hokianga.

Military division

- Senior Commissioned Master-at-Arms Jack Alan Cameron – Royal New Zealand Navy.
- Major (temporary) Eric Rowland Firth BEM – New Zealand Regiment (Regular Force).
- Warrant Officer Class II Alfred Benjamin Parkes – Royal New Zealand Armoured Corps (Territorial Force).
- Major Godfrey Henry Stace ED – Royal New Zealand Armoured Corps (Territorial Force).
- Flight Lieutenant Aubrey Leonard Herbert Forster – Royal New Zealand Air Force.
- Flight Lieutenant Eric Wilson MC – Royal New Zealand Air Force.
- Warrant Officer Cyril Benjamin Hill – Royal New Zealand Air Force.

== Companion of the Imperial Service Order (ISO) ==
- Russell Gladstone Dick – surveyor-general, Lands and Survey Department.
- Robert Drane Steel – private secretary to the Minister of Agriculture.

== British Empire Medal (BEM) ==
Military division

- Chief Petty Officer Telegraphist Kenneth Peter Illsley – Royal New Zealand Navy.
- Petty Officer John Burnham Martin – Royal New Zealand Navy.
- Chief Petty Officer Writer Brian Calvert Turnbull – Royal New Zealand Navy.
- Chief Engineering Mechanic Roy William Broderick Waide – Royal New Zealand Navy.
- Warrant Officer Class II (temporary) Frederick Brown – Royal New Zealand Infantry (Territorial Force).
- Flight Sergeant Pare Tewai – Royal New Zealand Air Force.
- Sergeant Neville Haig McDonald – Royal New Zealand Air Force.

== Air Force Cross (AFC) ==
- Flying Officer Gordon Harry Saywell Tosland – Royal New Zealand Air Force.

== Queen's Commendation for Valuable Service in the Air ==
- Warrant Officer Anthony Francis Whistler Mason – Royal New Zealand Air Force.
