= Roderick Syme =

Roderick Syme MBE (24 February 1900 – 2 May 1994) was a notable New Zealand agricultural instructor, mountaineer, conservationist and alpine sports administrator. He was born in Hāwera, New Zealand, in 1900. In 1931, he climbed a new ridge route on Mount Tasman. The ridge now bears Syme's name. In 1931, he also won the New Zealand long-distance skiing championship.

In the 1955 Queen's Birthday Honours, Syme was appointed a Member of the Order of the British Empire, for services as an agricultural instructor and in fostering mountaineering.
