= Pat Entrican =

New Zealand civil engineer and forestry administrator

Alexander Robert Entrican CBE (28 January 1898 – 21 April 1965), commonly known as Pat Entrican, was a New Zealand civil engineer and forestry administrator. He was born in Devonport, Auckland, New Zealand, on 28 January 1898.

In 1953, Entrican was awarded the Queen Elizabeth II Coronation Medal. In the 1955 Queen's Birthday Honours, he was appointed a Commander of the Order of the British Empire.
