= Cecil Clinkard =

New Zealand politician

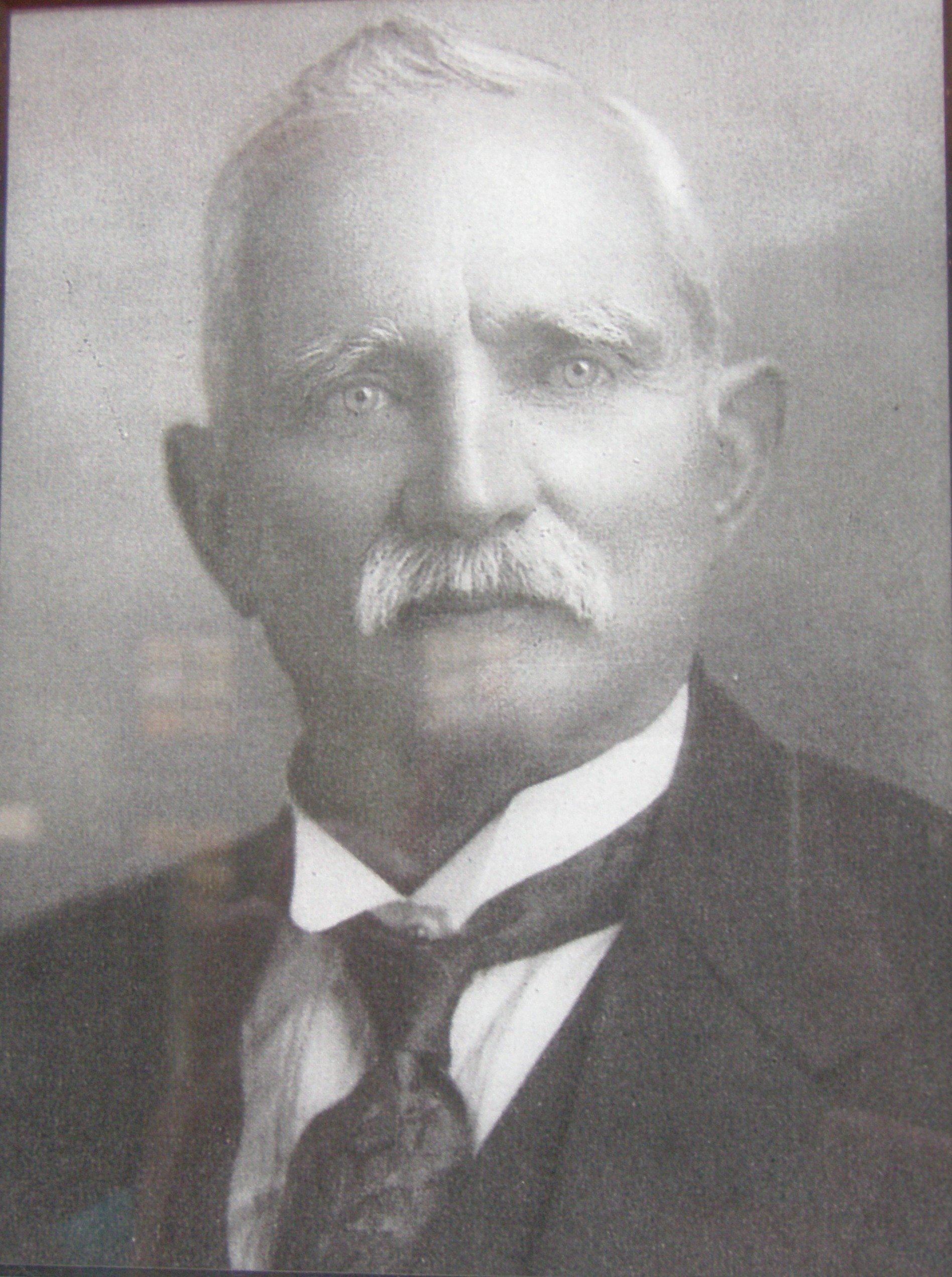

1st Mayor of Rotorua
- In office 1923–1927
- Succeeded by: Thomas McDowell

Member of the New Zealand Parliament for Rotorua
- In office 14 November 1928 – 1 November 1935
- Preceded by: Frank Hockly
- Succeeded by: Alexander Moncur
- Majority: 200 (1928); 57 (1931)

Personal details
- Born: 1862 Oxfordshire, England
- Died: 24 March 1941 (aged 79) Rotorua, New Zealand
- Party: United
- Children: George Clinkard (son)

Cecil Henry Clinkard (1862 – 24 March 1941) was a United Party Member of Parliament in New Zealand, and the first mayor of Rotorua.

== Early life ==
Clinkard was born in 1862 in Oxfordshire, England. He came to New Zealand with his parents in 1867. His father, Thomas Clinkard, was the first European settler at Makarau on the Kaipara Harbour, where for three years his mother did not set eyes on a white woman. Being brought up to bush work, he commenced as a bush contractor at the age of 16, and mainly worked in the timber industry as a young adult. He took up large tracts of bush country and then worked out the timber, having it towed to Wairoa, from where it got shipped to London, Sydney, Adelaide, and the southern ports of New Zealand.

Clinkard was then one of the original settlers of the Mamaku area in the Bay of Plenty. Later, he lived at Devonport. He moved to Rotorua in 1917 and became a taxi proprietor.

== Political career ==
New Zealand Parliament
Years	Term	Electorate	Party
1928–1931	23rd	Rotorua	United
1931–1935	24th	Rotorua	United

Clinkard was secretary to the Kaukapakapa Road Board.

Clinkard first stood in a general election in 1905 for the Liberal Party, when he challenged the incumbent in the Waitemata electorate, Ewen Alison. He unsuccessfully contested the Rotorua electorate in the 1922 and 1925 elections, coming a close second in 1922, and a distant second in 1925.

On the formation of the Rotorua Borough Council in 1923, Clinkard was elected as the inaugural mayor of Rotorua and served in that role until 1927. Following his mayoralty, he served on the Borough Council for another year. He was Rotorua's representative on the Tauranga Harbour Board.

He won the Rotorua electorate in 1928, but was defeated in 1935, when he came third out of four candidates.

In 1935, he was awarded the King George V Silver Jubilee Medal. Clinkard was a member of the Rotorua Rotary Club, and was active on the school committee.

== Family and death ==
On 11 July 1883, Clinkard married Julia Letitia Hooper (born 1862) at Onehunga. She was the daughter of the late Charles Hooper of Somersetshire, later Warkworth. Their eldest son was also named Cecil Henry; he married Margaret Tessier Gray in 1914. Four other sons, Charles Thomas, Sidney Eric, George William, and Alfred Edwin served in World War I. George William Clinkard was later a notable public servant and trade commissioner.

His wife died on 26 July 1932 at Auckland Hospital; Clinkard was a member of parliament at the time. His grandson, Derek Charles Gray Clinkard (the eldest son of his eldest son), died on 8 March 1940 in a plane crash in World War II. A year later, Cecil Clinkard died on 24 March 1941 aged 79 at Rotorua after a long illness. He was survived by five sons.

== Notes ==
New Zealand Parliament
Preceded by Frank Hockly	Member of Parliament for Rotorua; 1928–1935	Succeeded by Alexander Moncur
Political offices
New office	Mayor of Rotorua; 1923–1927	Succeeded by Thomas McDowell
