= Tony Ryall =

New Zealand politician

The Honourable Tony Ryall CNZM
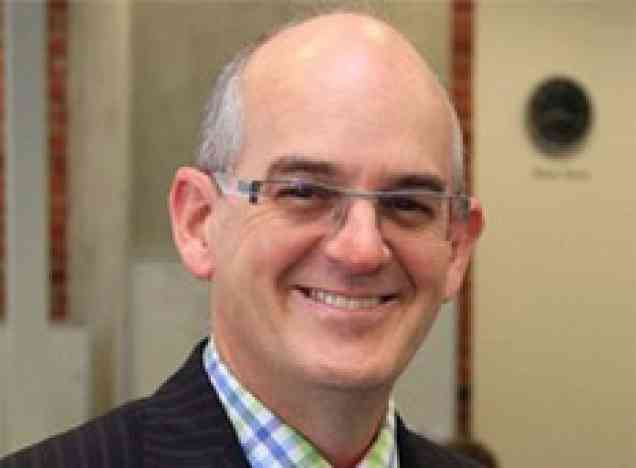

38th Minister of Health
- In office 19 November 2008 – 8 October 2014
- Prime Minister: John Key
- Preceded by: David Cunliffe
- Succeeded by: Jonathan Coleman

Minister for State-Owned Enterprises
- In office 13 April 2011 – 8 October 2014
- Prime Minister: John Key
- Preceded by: Simon Power
- Succeeded by: Todd McClay

Member of the New Zealand Parliament for Bay of Plenty
- In office 12 October 1996 – 20 August 2014
- Preceded by: New electorate
- Succeeded by: Todd Muller

Member of the New Zealand Parliament for East Cape
- In office 27 October 1990 – 6 November 1993
- Preceded by: Anne Fraser
- Succeeded by: Electorate abolished

Member of the New Zealand Parliament for Eastern Bay of Plenty
- In office 6 November 1993 – 12 October 1996
- Preceded by: New electorate
- Succeeded by: Electorate abolished

Personal details
- Born: 19 November 1964 (age 61) New Zealand
- Party: National
- Occupation: Credit analyst

Anthony Boyd Williams Ryall CNZM (born 19 November 1964) is a former New Zealand politician. He represented the National Party in the New Zealand Parliament from 1990 to 2014. Between 2008 and 2014 he served as a cabinet minister, holding the posts of Minister of Health, Minister of State Services and Minister of State Owned Enterprises. He served previously in the Shipley Cabinet between 1997 and 1999. He announced in February 2014 that he was to retire from politics at that year's general election. He is chief executive of BestStart Educare, an early childhood education provider.

== Early life and family ==
Ryall was born in Christchurch in 19 November 1964, and was educated in the Eastern Bay of Plenty and graduated Bachelor of Business Studies (Accounting and Finance) from Massey University. Ryall is married with two children.

== Professional career ==
Before entering politics, he worked as a credit analyst at a bank. In 1990 he was in the Corporate Credit Recovery section of the Bank of New Zealand. He joined the East Cape branch of the Young Nationals in 1980. In 1987 he was an assistant at the party National Headquarters, and in 1988/89 was Canvassing Coordinator and Treasurer of the Miramar electorate.

== Member of Parliament ==
New Zealand Parliament
| Years | Term | Electorate | List | Party |
|---|---|---|---|---|
| 1990–1993 | 43rd | East Cape | | National |
| 1993–1996 | 44th | Eastern Bay of Plenty | | National |
| 1996–1999 | 45th | Bay of Plenty | 29 | National |
| 1999–2002 | 46th | Bay of Plenty | 9 | National |
| 2002–2005 | 47th | Bay of Plenty | 8 | National |
| 2005–2008 | 48th | Bay of Plenty | 6 | National |
| 2008–2011 | 49th | Bay of Plenty | 6 | National |
| 2011–2014 | 50th | Bay of Plenty | 5 | National |

=== 1990–1999 ===
He first won election to Parliament as Member of Parliament for the East Cape electorate in the 1990 election at age 26. Subsequent boundary reorganisations saw him represent the Eastern Bay of Plenty electorate (1993–1996) and the Bay of Plenty electorate (1996–2014).

Ryall served in the Cabinet between 1997 and 1999 variously as Minister for State-Owned Enterprises (8 December 1997 – 10 December 1999), Minister of Local Government ( 31 August 1998 – 31 January 1999), Minister of Youth Affairs (31 August 1998 – 10 December 1999), Associate Minister of Justice (8 December 1997 – 31 January 1999), Minister of Justice (31 January – 10 December 1999), Minister in Charge of the Audit Department (8 December 1997 – 26 August 1998), Minister Responsible for Radio New Zealand (8 December 1997 – 31 January 1999), and Minister Responsible for Housing New Zealand (31 January 1999 – 10 December 1999).

=== In Opposition: 1999–2008 ===
During the National Party's time in Opposition, he was spokesperson for Housing (1999–2002), Justice (1999–2002), Timberlands and SILNA (1999–2002), Commerce (15 August 2002 – 2 November 2003), Corrections (15 August 2002 – 2 November 2003), Courts (15 August 2002 – 2 November 2003), Police (15 August 2002 – 2 November 2003), Sentencing (15 August 2002 – 2 November 2003), Law and Order (2003 – 26 October 2005), and Immigration (9 August 2004 – 26 October 2005).

In the 2005 general election Ryall won the largest National Party electorate majority in the country: in his Bay of Plenty electorate he gained a majority of approximately 15,800 votes. In the 2008 election he secured the country's second largest majority, behind the Prime Minister's 17,600 majority.

=== Cabinet Minister in the Fifth National Government: 2008–2014 ===
From November 2008 to his retirement from politics in 2014, he served as the Minister of Health. Along with the Minister of Finance, Ryall oversaw National's government share offer programme, which yielded $4.7b from the partial sale of three state-owned electricity generators and Air New Zealand. He announced in February 2014 that he was to retire from politics at that year's general election.

Ryall was appointed a Companion of the New Zealand Order of Merit, for services as a Member of Parliament, in the 2015 New Year Honours.

== After politics ==
Ryall joined law firm Simpson Grierson in November 2014 as head of its public policy practice. In February 2015, he was appointed a director of the New Zealand subsidiary of Australian nib Health Funds, a health insurance company. He is currently chief executive of BestStart Educare Limited.

Political offices
| Preceded by Doug Graham | Minister of Justice; 1999 | Succeeded by Phil Goff |
| Preceded by David Cunliffe | Minister of Health; 2008–2014 | Succeeded by Jonathan Coleman |
New Zealand Parliament
| Preceded by Anne Fraser | Member of Parliament for East Cape; 1990–1993 | Electorate abolished |
| New constituency | Member of Parliament for Eastern Bay of Plenty; 1993–1996 | Electorate abolished |
| In abeyance Title last held by Duncan MacIntyre | Member of Parliament for Bay of Plenty; 1996–2014 | Succeeded by Todd Muller |
