= George Clinkard =

New Zealand public servant and trade commissioner

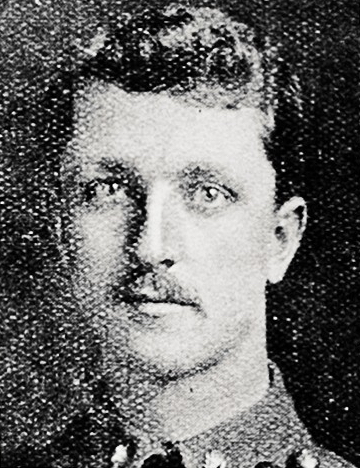
Clinkard during World War I

George William Clinkard CBE JP (17 September 1893 – 27 January 1970) was a New Zealand public servant and trade commissioner.

Clinkard was born in Auckland, New Zealand, on 17 September 1893. His English parents were Julia Letitia Hooper and her husband, the farmer Cecil Clinkard.

In 1935, Clinkard was awarded the King George V Silver Jubilee Medal, and in 1953 he received the Queen Elizabeth II Coronation Medal. In the 1955 Queen's Birthday Honours, he was appointed a Commander of the Order of the British Empire, for services as secretary of the Department of Industries and Commerce and as a member of the Board of Trade.

Clinkard died in 1970 and his ashes were buried in Purewa Cemetery, Auckland.
