= Rotorua (electorate) =

- Single-member general constituency for the New Zealand House of Representatives
- Interactive map of boundaries from the 2026 election
- Formation: 1919, 1954
- Region: Bay of Plenty
- Character: Rural
- Term: 3 years

Member for Rotorua
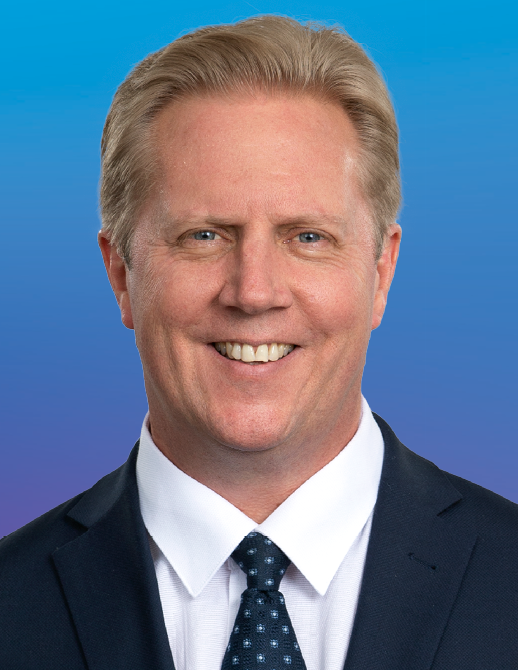
- Todd McClay since 8 November 2008
- Party: National
- Previous MP: Steve Chadwick (Labour)
Party vote distribution

Rotorua is a New Zealand parliamentary electorate, returning one Member of Parliament to the New Zealand House of Representatives. It was first established in 1919, and has existed continuously since 1954. The current MP for Rotorua is Todd McClay of the National Party, who won the electorate in the 2008 general election from incumbent Labour MP Steve Chadwick.

== Population centres ==
In the 1918 electoral redistribution, the North Island gained a further three electorates from the South Island due to faster population growth. Only two existing electorates were unaltered, five electorates were abolished, two former electorate were re-established, and three electorates, including Rotorua, were created for the first time.

The initial electorate, which was formed through the 1918 electoral redistribution, had a long coastline along the Bay of Plenty, and incorporated, beside Rotorua, the towns and villages of Whakatāne, Taupō, Tokoroa, Putāruru, Mangakino, Edgecumbe, Tāneatua, and Murupara. In the 1922 electoral redistribution, the electorate lost some area to the Bay of Plenty electorate, and a larger area to the Waikato electorate. The 1927 electoral redistribution saw Rotorua become landlocked, with the Tauranga electorate taking the coastline including Tāneatua and Edgecumbe, and Whakatāne going to the Bay of Plenty electorate. The electorate moved south and took in Lake Taupō, with Tūrangi just beyond the southern boundary located in the Waimarino electorate. The electorate also grew in the north-west, gaining the town of Matamata.

In the 1937 electoral redistribution, the electorate shifted further south again. Matamata was lost again, and the peaks of Tongariro, Ngauruhoe, and Ruapehu now formed the boundary to the Waimarino electorate. The 1946 electoral redistribution saw the Rotorua electorate abolished, with the Bay of Plenty electorate moving west and incorporating the town of Rotorua, most of the southern area going to the Waimarino electorate including the town of Taupō, and some area in the north-west going to the Waikato electorate including Tokoroa.

The First Labour Government was defeated in the 1949 election and the incoming National Government changed the Electoral Act, with the electoral quota once again based on total population as opposed to qualified electors, and the tolerance was increased to 7.5% of the electoral quota. There was no adjustments in the number of electorates between the South and North Islands, but the law changes resulted in boundary adjustments to almost every electorate through the 1952 electoral redistribution; only five electorates were unaltered. Five electorates were reconstituted (including Rotorua) and one was newly created, and a corresponding six electorates were abolished; all of these in the North Island. These changes took effect with the 1954 election. The electorate was again landlocked and much smaller than prior to its abolition. Significant settlements included Rotorua, Tokoroa, Taupō, and Mangakino, with Lake Taupō forming the southern boundary.

Map of boundaries at the 2020 and 2023 general elections

The current Rotorua electorate is positioned in the Bay of Plenty region in the central North Island. It is dominated by the town of Rotorua, and also contains the Eastern Bay of Plenty towns of Kawerau, Murupara and Galatea, the last two of which are located on the outskirts of Te Urewera National Park. In 2008, its boundaries were extended to the geographical bay, with the addition of coastline stretching from a cluster of rural towns including Pukehina and Maketu to the outskirts of Te Puke. In the 2025 boundary review, the electorate expanded northward to the outskirts of Tauranga with the Tauranga Eastern Link forming part of the northern boundary. Initial proposals saw the rural towns of the Kaimai Range added to the electorate, though this was reverted after public consultation.

== Demographics ==
Over forty per cent of the population of Rotorua is under the age of thirty, much of this because 37% of the electorate's residents are Māori, who are on the whole younger than the national average (22.7 years old versus a national average of 35.9). There are also fewer voters earning over $30,000 per year, with the majority of workers coming from working class and semi-skilled professionals. Rotorua also has more unemployed people (6.5%) than most electorates, being ranked 52nd in the nation.

The country quota applied until 1945 and the Rotorua electorate was initially classed as fully rural. Based on the 1926 New Zealand census, the 1927 Electoral Redistribution determined that 24% of the electorate's population was urban. Based on the 1936 census, the 1937 Electoral Redistribution determined that 36% of the electorate's population was urban.

== History ==
An electorate based around Rotorua has been a part of the New Zealand electoral landscape since the 1919 election, with a gap from 1946 to 1954. Previously the town of Rotorua was in the East Coast electorate (from 1871), then the East Coast electorate again (from 1890), then the Bay of Plenty electorate (from 1893), and then (just) in the Tauranga electorate again (from 1911 to 1919).

William Henry Wackrow was nominated in March 1922 as the opposition candidate for that year's election. Wackrow withdrew in November and was replaced by Cecil Clinkard, who lost against the incumbent, Frank Hockly of the Reform Party.

Geoffrey Sim of the National Party won the 1943 election. When the Rotorua electorate was abolished for the 1946 election, Sim successfully stood in Waikato electorate instead.

After the electorate was re-established through the 1952 Electoral Redistribution, Ray Boord of the Labour Party won the 1954 election. Boord served two parliamentary terms and was beaten by National's Harry Lapwood in the 1960 election. Lapwood served for six parliamentary terms and retired in 1978.

Lapwood was succeeded by his party colleague Paul East in the 1978 election. East also served six parliamentary terms until 1996. With the advent of Mixed Member Proportional (MMP) voting in 1996, the Rotorua electorate was greatly expanded to include areas previously part of the Eastern Bay of Plenty and Tarawera electorates. Both Tarawera and Rotorua were safe National Party electorates, and in the ensuing battle for the nomination, the two incumbents, East and Max Bradford, faced off for a Rotorua nomination eventually secured by Bradford, with East securing a high list position.

Bradford won the 1996 election with a nearly 6,000 votes margin. Despite both electorates being reasonably loyal to the National Party, Bradford's tenure as MP for Rotorua was just three years, before being ousted by Labour MP Steve Chadwick in the 1999 election. Chadwick's initial majority of 4,978 votes blew out to over 7,500 in 2002 before it was reined in to just 662 in 2005, as the National Party consolidated the centre-right vote, with its biggest gains being in the provincial North Island. In 2005, Chadwick's party was less popular than their candidate, coming 1,645 votes behind National.

In 2008 Chadwick was defeated by National candidate Todd McClay who won the electorate with a majority of 5,067 votes. In the 2011 election McClay again returned as the member for Rotorua, increasing his majority to 7,357 votes. In 2014, McClay was elected as MP for a third term beating television personality Tāmati Coffey by a similar majority to that in the previous election.

Rotorua is also an electorate where the New Zealand First party does well, with its biggest appeal among provincial New Zealanders, and as results in 1996 indicate, Māori: in the three most recent elections, New Zealand First has polled around three per cent higher in Rotorua than it did in the rest of New Zealand.

=== Members of Parliament ===
Unless otherwise stated, all MPs terms began and ended at general elections.

Key

Reform United Labour National

Election	Winner
1919 election	Frank Hockly
1922 election	Frank Hockly
1925 election	Frank Hockly
1928 election	Cecil Clinkard
1931 election	Cecil Clinkard
1935 election	Alexander Moncur
1938 election	Alexander Moncur
1943 election	Geoffrey Sim
(Electorate abolished 1946–1954, see Bay of Plenty, Waimarino, and Waikato)
1954 election	Ray Boord
1957 election	Ray Boord
1960 election	Harry Lapwood
1963 election	Harry Lapwood
1966 election	Harry Lapwood
1969 election	Harry Lapwood
1972 election	Harry Lapwood
1975 election	Harry Lapwood
1978 election	Paul East
1981 election	Paul East
1984 election	Paul East
1987 election	Paul East
1990 election	Paul East
1993 election	Paul East
1996 election	Max Bradford
1999 election	Steve Chadwick
2002 election	Steve Chadwick
2005 election	Steve Chadwick
2008 election	Todd McClay
2011 election	Todd McClay
2014 election	Todd McClay
2017 election	Todd McClay
2020 election	Todd McClay
2023 election	Todd McClay

=== List MPs ===
Members of Parliament elected from party lists in elections where that person also unsuccessfully contested the Rotorua electorate. Unless otherwise stated, all MPs terms began and ended at general elections.

Election	Winner
1999 election	Max Bradford
2008 election	Steve Chadwick
2014 election	Fletcher Tabuteau
2017 election	Fletcher Tabuteau

== Election results ==
=== 2026 election ===
The next election will be held on 7 November 2026. Candidates for Rotorua are listed at Candidates in the 2026 New Zealand general election by electorate § Rotorua. Official results will be available after 27 November 2026.

=== 2023 election ===
2023 general election: Rotorua
Notes:	Blue background denotes the winner of the electorate vote. Pink background denotes a candidate elected from their party list. Yellow background denotes an electorate win by a list member, or other incumbent. A ✓ or ✗ denotes status of any incumbent, win or lose respectively.						
Party	Candidate	Votes	%	±%	Party votes	%	±%
National	✓ Todd McClay	19,339	52.95	+9.66	15,317	41.36	+12.71
Labour	Ben Sandford	10,416	28.52	−12.57	8,922	24.09	−22.59
Te Pāti Māori	Merepeka Raukawa-Tait	2,731	7.48	—	851	2.30	+1.39
ACT	Marten Rozeboom	1,732	4.74	+1.93	3,543	9.57	+0.51
NewZeal	Kariana Black-Vercoe	1,252	3.43	+2.44	491	1.33	+0.87 (Note: Compared to ONE Party)
Independent	John Naera	354	0.97	—			
Green					2,885	7.79	+3.04
NZ First					2,835	7.66	+4.04
Opportunities					638	1.72	+1.25
NZ Loyal					618	1.67	—
Freedoms NZ					233	0.63	—
Legalise Cannabis					177	0.48	+0.01
DemocracyNZ					107	0.29	—
Animal Justice					54	0.15	—
New Conservative					50	0.14	−1.70
New Nation					35	0.09	—
Women's Rights					33	0.09	—
Leighton Baker Party					28	0.08	—
Informal votes		700			216		
Total valid votes		36,524			37,033		
National hold	Majority	8,923	24.43	+22.23			

=== 2020 election ===
2020 general election: Rotorua
Notes:	Blue background denotes the winner of the electorate vote. Pink background denotes a candidate elected from their party list. Yellow background denotes an electorate win by a list member, or other incumbent. A ✓ or ✗ denotes status of any incumbent, win or lose respectively.						
Party	Candidate	Votes	%	±%	Party votes	%	±%
National	✓ Todd McClay	16,212	43.29	−10.08	10,951	28.65	−19.68
Labour	Claire Mahon	15,387	41.09	+10.17	17,845	46.68	+14.38
Green	Kaya Sparke	1,887	5.04	+0.80	1,816	4.75	+0.61
NZ First	Fletcher Tabuteau	1,412	3.77	−4.93	1,383	3.62	−6.28
ACT	Pete Kirkwood	1,053	2.81	—	3,463	9.06	+8.73
New Conservative	Alan Tāne Solomon	564	1.51	+1.19	703	1.84	+1.57
Advance NZ	Kiri Ward	563	1.50	—	518	1.36	—
ONE	Kari-Ann Varcoe	372	0.99	—	177	0.46	—
Opportunities					606	1.59	−1.12
Māori Party					347	0.91	−0.35
Legalise Cannabis					179	0.47	+0.15
Vision NZ					141	0.37	—
Outdoors					50	0.13	+0.07
Sustainable NZ					21	0.05	—
Social Credit					16	0.04	+0.02
TEA					8	0.02	—
Heartland					4	0.01	—
Informal votes		701			260		
Total valid votes		37,450			38,228		
National hold	Majority	825	2.20	−20.25			

=== 2017 election ===
2017 general election: Rotorua
Notes:	Blue background denotes the winner of the electorate vote. Pink background denotes a candidate elected from their party list. Yellow background denotes an electorate win by a list member, or other incumbent. A ✓ or ✗ denotes status of any incumbent, win or lose respectively.						
Party	Candidate	Votes	%	±%	Party votes	%	±%
National	✓ Todd McClay	18,788	53.37	−2.42	17,390	48.33	−3.54
Labour	Ben Sandford	10,887	30.92	−2.75	11,622	32.3	+11.21
NZ First	Fletcher Tabuteau	3,062	8.70	+1.35	3,561	9.90	−2.26
Green	Richard Gillies	1,491	4.24	—	1,488	4.14	−2.58
Māori Party	Wendy Biddle	702	1.99	—	454	1.26	−0.17
Independent	Rachel Clark	162	0.46	—			
Conservative	Owen Patterson	114	0.32	−1.5	97	0.27	−3.73
Opportunities					974	2.71	—
ACT					120	0.33	−0.09
Legalise Cannabis					116	0.32	−0.15
Ban 1080					66	0.18	−0.12
People's Party					30	0.08	—
Outdoors					23	0.06	—
United Future					19	0.05	−0.16
Democrats					8	0.02	−0.03
Internet					8	0.02	−0.78 (Note: 2017 Internet Party swing is relative to the votes for Internet-Mana in 2014; it shared a party list with Mana Party in the 2014 election)
Mana					8	0.02	−0.78 (Note: 2017 Mana Party swing is relative to the votes for Internet-Mana in 2014; it shared a party list with the Internet Party in the 2014 election)
Informal votes		379			133		
Total valid votes		35,585			36,117		
National hold	Majority	7,901	22.45	+0.34			

=== 2014 election ===
2014 general election: Rotorua
Notes:	Blue background denotes the winner of the electorate vote. Pink background denotes a candidate elected from their party list. Yellow background denotes an electorate win by a list member, or other incumbent. A ✓ or ✗ denotes status of any incumbent, win or lose respectively.						
Party	Candidate	Votes	%	±%	Party votes	%	±%
National	✓ Todd McClay	18,145	55.79	−1.38	17,660	51.87	+0.60
Labour	Tāmati Coffey	11,297	33.67	+1.54	7,181	21.09	−0.86
NZ First	Fletcher Tabuteau	2,466	7.35	+0.28	4,139	12.16	+1.61
Conservative	Michael Davidson	610	1.82	−1.13	1,361	4.00	+0.99
ACT	Lyall Russell	132	0.39	+0.39	142	0.42	−0.43
Green					2,289	6.72	−1.85
Māori Party					486	1.43	+0.15
Internet Mana					272	0.80	−0.24
Legalise Cannabis					160	0.47	−0.03
Ban 1080					101	0.30	+0.30
United Future					72	0.21	−0.61
Independent Coalition					33	0.10	+0.10
Democrats					16	0.05	+0.01
Civilian					11	0.03	+0.03
Focus					4	0.01	+0.01
Informal votes		328			122		
Total valid votes		33,548			34,049		
National hold	Majority	7,418	22.11	−1.93			

=== 2011 election ===
2011 general election: Rotorua
Notes:	Blue background denotes the winner of the electorate vote. Pink background denotes a candidate elected from their party list. Yellow background denotes an electorate win by a list member, or other incumbent. A ✓ or ✗ denotes status of any incumbent, win or lose respectively.						
Party	Candidate	Votes	%	±%	Party votes	%	±%
National	✓ Todd McClay	17,188	56.17	+2.26	16,159	51.27	+0.92
Labour	Steve Chadwick	9,831	32.13	−6.35	6,919	21.95	−8.08
NZ First	Fletcher Tabuteau	2,166	7.08	+7.08	3,326	10.55	+4.21
Conservative	Daryl Smith	903	2.95	+2.95	948	3.01	+3.01
Mana	Grant Rogers	510	1.67	+1.67	327	1.04	+1.04
Green					2,700	8.57	+3.58
Māori Party					404	1.28	−0.50
ACT					269	0.85	−1.78
United Future					258	0.82	−0.02
Legalise Cannabis					159	0.50	+0.06
Libertarianz					19	0.06	+0.02
Alliance					15	0.05	−0.05
Democrats					14	0.04	+0.02
Informal votes		835			307		
Total valid votes		30,598			31,517		
National hold	Majority	7,357	24.04	+8.62			

Electorate (as at 26 November 2011): 42,886

=== 2008 election ===
2008 general election: Rotorua
Notes:	Blue background denotes the winner of the electorate vote. Pink background denotes a candidate elected from their party list. Yellow background denotes an electorate win by a list member, or other incumbent. A ✓ or ✗ denotes status of any incumbent, win or lose respectively.						
Party	Candidate	Votes	%	±%	Party votes	%	±%
National	Todd McClay	17,700	53.91	+15.31	16,836	50.35	+8.46
Labour	✗ Steve Chadwick	12,635	38.48	−2.29	10,044	30.04	−6.63
Green	Raewyn Saville	1,665	5.07	+1.36	1,666	4.98	+1.21
Kiwi	Daryl Smith	365	1.11	+1.11	183	0.55	+0.55
United Future	Arthur Solomon	241	0.73	−6.22	282	0.84	−2.12
RAM	Grant Rogers	145	0.44	+0.44	24	0.07	+0.07
Libertarianz	Fred Stevens	82	0.25	+0.25	15	0.04	+0.01
NZ First					2,122	6.35	−2.89
ACT					879	2.63	+1.44
Māori Party					596	1.78	+0.22
Progressive					200	0.60	−0.26
Family Party					193	0.58	+0.58
Bill and Ben					186	0.56	+0.56
Legalise Cannabis					147	0.44	+0.18
Alliance					33	0.10	+0.03
Pacific					13	0.04	+0.04
Workers Party					8	0.02	+0.02
Democrats					7	0.02	−0.03
RONZ					4	0.01	−0.02
Informal votes		364			154		
Total valid votes		32,833			33,438		
National gain from Labour	Majority	5,065	15.43	+13.25			

=== 2005 election ===
2005 general election: Rotorua
Notes:	Blue background denotes the winner of the electorate vote. Pink background denotes a candidate elected from their party list. Yellow background denotes an electorate win by a list member, or other incumbent. A ✓ or ✗ denotes status of any incumbent, win or lose respectively.						
Party	Candidate	Votes	%	±%	Party votes	%	±%
Labour	✓ Steve Chadwick	12,420	40.77	−10.63	11,350	36.67	−0.96
National	Gil Stehbens	11,758	38.60	+14.88	12,965	41.89	+21.46
United Future	Russell Judd	2,119	6.96	+1.63	916	2.96	−4.12
NZ First	Fletcher Tabuteau	2,055	6.75	−2.53	2,860	9.24	−7.21
Green	Raewyn Saville	1,131	3.71	−0.14	1,168	3.77	−2.13
Destiny	Elaine Herbert	604	1.98	+1.98	397	1.28	+1.28
ACT	Carl Peterson	378	1.24	+1.24	367	1.19	−4.15
Māori Party					484	1.56	+1.56
Progressive					267	0.86	−0.69
Legalise Cannabis					83	0.23	−0.66
Alliance					20	0.06	−0.83
Christian Heritage					16	0.05	−1.18
Democrats					16	0.05	+0.05
Libertarianz					10	0.03	+0.03
Family Rights					9	0.03	+0.03
RONZ					9	0.03	+0.03
Direct Democracy					7	0.02	+0.02
One NZ					5	0.02	−0.05
99 MP					4	0.01	+0.01
Informal votes		326			125		
Total valid votes		30,465			30,950		
Labour hold	Majority	662	2.17	−25.51			

=== 2002 election ===
2002 general election: Rotorua
Notes:	Blue background denotes the winner of the electorate vote. Pink background denotes a candidate elected from their party list. Yellow background denotes an electorate win by a list member, or other incumbent. A ✓ or ✗ denotes status of any incumbent, win or lose respectively.						
Party	Candidate	Votes	%	±%	Party votes	%	±%
Labour	✓ Steve Chadwick	14380	51.40	+1.70	10700	37.63	−0.80
National	Malcolm Short	6636	23.72	−8.88	5809	20.43	−10.30
NZ First	Fletcher Tabuteau	2595	9.28	+5.60	4677	16.45	+10.64
United Future	Russell Judd	1490	5.33	+5.33	2014	7.08	+7.08
Green	Richard Kake	1078	3.85	−0.37	1679	5.90	+0.61
NZ Equal Rights Party	Cliff Lee	806	2.88	+0.07			
Christian Heritage	Ross Prichard	391	1.40	−0.86	350	1.23	−1.19
Independent	Reg Turner	232	0.83	+0.83			
Progressive	David Espin	194	0.69	+0.69	442	1.55	+1.55
Alliance	Julie Poupard	175	0.63	−1.75	252	0.89	−5.98
ACT					1518	5.34	−0.48
ORNZ					791	2.78	+2.78
Legalise Cannabis					156	0.55	−0.53
Mana Māori					28	0.10	−0.09
One NZ					19	0.07	−0.03
NMP					1	0.00	−0.01
Informal votes		335			114		
Total valid votes		27977			28436		
Labour hold	Majority	7744	27.68	+10.59			

=== 1999 election ===
1999 general election: Rotorua
Notes:	Blue background denotes the winner of the electorate vote. Pink background denotes a candidate elected from their party list. Yellow background denotes an electorate win by a list member, or other incumbent. A ✓ or ✗ denotes status of any incumbent, win or lose respectively.						
Party	Candidate	Votes	%	±%	Party votes	%	±%
Labour	Steve Chadwick	14,474	49.70		11,299	38.42	+15.27
National	✗ Max Bradford	9,496	32.60	−8.10	9,037	30.73	−5.31
Green	Lynne Dempsey	1,230	4.22		1,557	5.29	
NZ First	Robert Dixon	1,070	3.67		1,708	5.81	−12.37
NZ Equal Rights Party	Cliff Lee	819	2.81				
Alliance	Pirihira Kaio	692	2.38		2,018	6.86	−2.90
Christian Heritage	Ross Prichard	657	2.26		713	2.42	−1.99
Christian Democrats	Andrew James Parr	619	2.13		536	1.82	
Natural Law	Martin Sharp	68	0.23		27	0.09	+0.02
ACT					1,710	5.82	+1.12
Legalise Cannabis					316	1.07	−0.33
United NZ					144	0.49	−0.09
Libertarianz					127	0.43	+0.42
Animals First					55	0.19	+0.02
Mana Māori					54	0.18	+0.11
McGillicuddy Serious					42	0.14	−0.20
One NZ					29	0.10	
Mauri Pacific					16	0.05	
The People's Choice					9	0.03	
NMP					4	0.01	
South Island					3	0.01	
Freedom Movement					1	0.00	
Republican					1	0.00	
Informal votes		545			264		
Total valid votes		29,125			29,406		
Labour gain from National	Majority	4,978	17.09				

=== 1996 election ===
1996 general election: Rotorua
Notes:	Blue background denotes the winner of the electorate vote. Pink background denotes a candidate elected from their party list. Yellow background denotes an electorate win by a list member, or other incumbent. A ✓ or ✗ denotes status of any incumbent, win or lose respectively.						
Party	Candidate	Votes	%	±%	Party votes	%	±%
National	Max Bradford	12,124	40.70		10,734	36.04	
Alliance	Keith Ridings	6,228	20.91	−10.78	2,909	9.76	
NZ First	Charles Sturt	5,029	16.88		5,417	18.18	
Labour	Rosemary Michie	4,149	13.93		6,895	23.15	
Christian Coalition	Geoff Winter	834	2.80		1,316	4.41	
ACT	Stephen Wrathall	371	1.24		1,402	4.70	
Conservatives	Dennis Quirke	225	0.75		74	0.24	
Progressive Green	Allan Williams	192	0.64		102	0.34	
McGillicuddy Serious	Adrian Holroyd	183	0.61		102	0.34	
Te Tawharau	Hawea Vercoe	183	0.61		11	0.03	
Natural Law	Frank Gwynne	37	0.12		22	0.07	
Legalise Cannabis					417	1.40	
United NZ					174	0.58	
Animals First					52	0.17	
Green Society					24	0.08	
Mana Māori					22	0.07	
Ethnic Minority					12	0.04	
Superannuitants & Youth					12	0.04	
Libertarianz					3	0.01	
Asia Pacific					2	0.00	
Advance NZ					1	0.00	
Informal votes		198			80		
Total valid votes		29,783			29,783		
National hold	Majority	5,896	19.79				

=== 1993 election ===
1993 general election: Rotorua
Party	Candidate	Votes	%	±%
National	Paul East	5,893	34.18	−22.69
Alliance	Keith Ridings	5,464	31.69	
Labour	John Chadwick	5,018	29.10	
Christian Heritage	B Kohath	374	2.16	
Independent	Reg Turner	164	0.95	
McGillicuddy Serious	Graeme Cairns	147	0.85	
Defence Movement	R Reed	133	0.77	
Natural Law	Martin Sharp	47	0.27	
Majority		429	2.48	−28.38
Turnout		17,240	80.65	−0.66
Registered electors		21,376		

=== 1990 election ===
1990 general election: Rotorua
Party	Candidate	Votes	%	±%
National	Paul East	9,710	56.87	+1.22
Labour	Bruce Raitt	4,440	26.00	
Green	Ronald Reed	1,732	10.14	
NewLabour	Kevin John Goddard	725	4.24	
Independent	Clifford Owen Lee	229	1.34	
Social Credit	Margaret Lynley Crosby	170	0.99	
Democrats	Trevor Barnard	66	0.38	
Majority		5,270	30.86	+17.29
Turnout		17,072	81.31	−11.99
Registered electors		20,995		

=== 1987 election ===
1987 general election: Rotorua
Party	Candidate	Votes	%	±%
National	Paul East	9,883	55.32	+10.17
Labour	Rosemary Michie	7,458	41.74	
Democrats	H O Dassler	523	2.92	
Majority		2,425	13.57	+9.39
Turnout		17,864	93.30	−7.75
Registered electors		19,145		

=== 1984 election ===
1984 general election: Rotorua
Party	Candidate	Votes	%	±%
National	Paul East	8,746	45.15	−0.20
Labour	Brian Arps	7,935	40.96	
NZ Party	Ross Alan Aubertin	2,094	10.81	
Social Credit	Kevin Douglas Steele	594	3.06	
Majority		811	4.18	−4.90
Turnout		19,369	101.05	+13.53
Registered electors		19,167		

=== 1981 election ===
1981 general election: Rotorua
Party	Candidate	Votes	%	±%
National	Paul East	7,709	45.35	+1.14
Labour	Johnny W. Lepper	6,165	36.26	
Social Credit	J L Doel	3,124	18.37	
Majority		1,544	9.08	−2.76
Turnout		16,998	87.52	+17.49
Registered electors		19,421		

=== 1978 election ===
1978 general election: Rotorua
Party	Candidate	Votes	%	±%
National	Paul East	7,126	44.21	
Labour	Peter Tapsell	6,106	37.88	+1.82
Social Credit	Graeme John Eustace	2,565	15.91	
Values	Margaret Jane Larsen	321	1.99	
Majority		1,020	6.32	
Turnout		16,118	70.03	−15.24
Registered electors		23,013		

=== 1975 election ===
1975 general election: Rotorua
Party	Candidate	Votes	%	±%
National	Harry Lapwood	11,561	52.40	+3.94
Labour	Peter Tapsell	7,956	36.06	
Social Credit	C F Smith	1,617	7.33	
Values	Lois McKinnon	925	4.19	
Majority		3,605	16.34	+11.58
Turnout		22,059	85.27	−3.33
Registered electors		25,868		

=== 1972 election ===
1972 general election: Rotorua
Party	Candidate	Votes	%	±%
National	Harry Lapwood	7,997	48.46	−1.44
Labour	N F Pachoud	7,211	43.70	
Social Credit	R W Johnson	903	5.47	
New Democratic	R O Fairweather	330	2.00	−5.89
Liberal Reform	C J Tapper	59	0.35	
Majority		786	4.76	−2.93
Turnout		16,500	88.60	+0.59
Registered electors		18,623		

=== 1969 election ===
1969 general election: Rotorua
Party	Candidate	Votes	%	±%
National	Harry Lapwood	7,772	49.90	−1.42
Labour	Charles Bennett	6,574	42.20	
Social Credit	R O Fairweather	1,229	7.89	
Majority		1,198	7.69	−8.14
Turnout		15,575	88.01	+5.57
Registered electors		17,695		

=== 1966 election ===
1966 general election: Rotorua
Party	Candidate	Votes	%	±%
National	Harry Lapwood	7,450	51.32	−1.20
Labour	Frank Knipe	5,152	35.50	
Social Credit	Edith Janette Lamason	2,465	16.98	+6.75
Majority		2,298	15.83	+0.56
Turnout		14,514	82.44	−7.88
Registered electors		17,605		

=== 1963 election ===
1963 general election: Rotorua
Party	Candidate	Votes	%	±%
National	Harry Lapwood	7,623	52.52	+5.69
Labour	James Phillip Cranston	5,406	37.25	
Social Credit	Edith Janette Lamason	1,485	10.23	
Majority		2,217	15.27	+13.13
Turnout		14,514	90.32	+0.62
Registered electors		16,068		

=== 1960 election ===
1960 general election: Rotorua
Party	Candidate	Votes	%	±%
National	Harry Lapwood	7,831	46.83	
Labour	Ray Boord	7,473	44.69	−8.59
Social Credit	C R Tunnicliffe	1,416	8.46	
Majority		358	2.14	
Turnout		16,720	89.70	−3.73
Registered electors		18,638		

=== 1957 election ===
1957 general election: Rotorua
Party	Candidate	Votes	%	±%
Labour	Ray Boord	8,204	53.28	+4.76
National	Murray Linton	6,195	40.23	
Social Credit	Herbert James Buckingham	998	6.48	
Majority		2,009	13.04	+7.51
Turnout		15,397	93.43	−1.14
Registered electors		16,479		

=== 1954 election ===
1954 general election: Rotorua
Party	Candidate	Votes	%	±%
Labour	Ray Boord	7,211	48.52	
National	Percy Allen	6,389	42.99	
Social Credit	Hubert C. McCready	1,261	8.48	
Majority		822	5.53	
Turnout		14,861	94.57	
Registered electors		15,714		

=== 1943 election ===
1943 general election: Rotorua
Party	Candidate	Votes	%	±%
National	Geoffrey Sim	5,304	49.74	
Labour	Alexander Moncur	4,589	43.03	−14.23
Democratic Labour	William Henry Tong	521	4.88	
Real Democracy	Tom Godfrey Burnham	164	1.53	
Informal votes		85	0.79	+0.12
Majority		715	6.70	
Turnout		10,663	92.29	+0.62
Registered electors		11,553		

=== 1938 election ===
1938 general election: Rotorua
Party	Candidate	Votes	%	±%
Labour	Alexander Moncur	6,211	57.26	+14.12
National	Henry William Nixon	4,563	42.06	
Informal votes		73	0.67	+0.11
Majority		1,648	15.19	+2.39
Turnout		10,847	91.67	+3.03
Registered electors		11,832		

=== 1935 election ===
1935 general election: Rotorua
Party	Candidate	Votes	%	±%
Labour	Alexander Moncur	4,894	43.14	+10.60
Independent	Frederick Doidge	3,442	30.34	
United	Cecil Clinkard	2,785	24.55	−8.60
Democrat	H. Hugh Corbin	223	1.97	
Informal votes		64	0.56	−0.08
Majority		1,452	12.80	+12.19
Turnout		11,408	88.64	+8.81
Registered electors		12,870		

=== 1931 election ===
1931 general election: Rotorua
Party	Candidate	Votes	%	±%
United	Cecil Clinkard	3,117	33.15	−10.34
Labour	Alexander Moncur	3,060	32.54	
Independent	Edward Earle Vaile	1,815	19.30	
Country Party	D R F Campbell	1,411	15.01	
Informal votes		61	0.64	−0.84
Majority		57	0.61	−1.80
Turnout		9,464	79.83	−4.27
Registered electors		11,855		

=== 1928 election ===
1928 general election: Rotorua
Party	Candidate	Votes	%	±%
United	Cecil Clinkard	3,617	43.49	+21.59
Reform	Frank Hockly	3,417	41.08	−18.61
Labour	A. G. Christopher	659	7.92	
Country Party	S. H. Judd	624	7.50	
Informal votes		125	1.48	+0.91
Majority		200	2.40	−35.39
Turnout		8,442	84.10	−5.34
Registered electors		10,038		

=== 1925 election ===
1925 general election: Rotorua
Party	Candidate	Votes	%	±%
Reform	Frank Hockly	4,384	59.69	+6.54
Liberal	Cecil Clinkard	1,608	21.90	−24.95
Labour	John William Sumner	1,148	15.63	
Country Party	Frank Colbeck (Note: For biographical details of Frank Colbeck, please refer to his father's article)	204	2.78	
Informal votes		42	0.57	−0.53
Majority		2,776	37.80	+31.50
Turnout		7,386	89.44	−1.11
Registered electors		8,258		

Table footnotes:

=== 1922 election ===
1922 general election: Rotorua
Party	Candidate	Votes	%	±%
Reform	Frank Hockly	3,407	53.15	+2.70
Liberal	Cecil Clinkard	3,003	46.85	
Informal votes		71	1.10	−0.22
Majority		404	6.30	−20.53
Turnout		6,481	90.55	+8.83
Registered electors		7,157		

=== 1919 election ===
1919 general election: Rotorua
Party	Candidate	Votes	%	±%
Reform	Frank Hockly	3,258	50.45	
Liberal	Malcolm Larney	1,525	23.61	
Labour	George Thomas Jones	854	13.22	
Independent	W. C. Hewitt	497	7.70	
Independent	Patrick Keegan (Note: Some sources list Keegan as an independent Reform Party supporter)	324	5.02	
Majority		1,733	26.83	
Informal votes		86	1.31	
Turnout		6,544	81.73	
Registered electors		8,007		

Table footnotes:
