= Bright Future (policy) =

‘Bright Future’ was an innovation policy initiated by the National government in New Zealand in 1999. Originally called ‘Five Steps Ahead’, it was designed to identify the areas in which New Zealand innovation could be improved, including the tall poppy syndrome. It was overseen by the Ministry of Commerce, whose minister at the time was the Hon Max Bradford.

Amongst other initiatives, the Bright Future programme introduced a group of scholarships for talented students at graduate and post-graduate level.

The policy was dropped by the Fifth Labour Government.

== See also ==
- Politics of New Zealand
