= Paul East =

New Zealand politician (1946–2023)

The Right Honourable Paul East CNZM KC
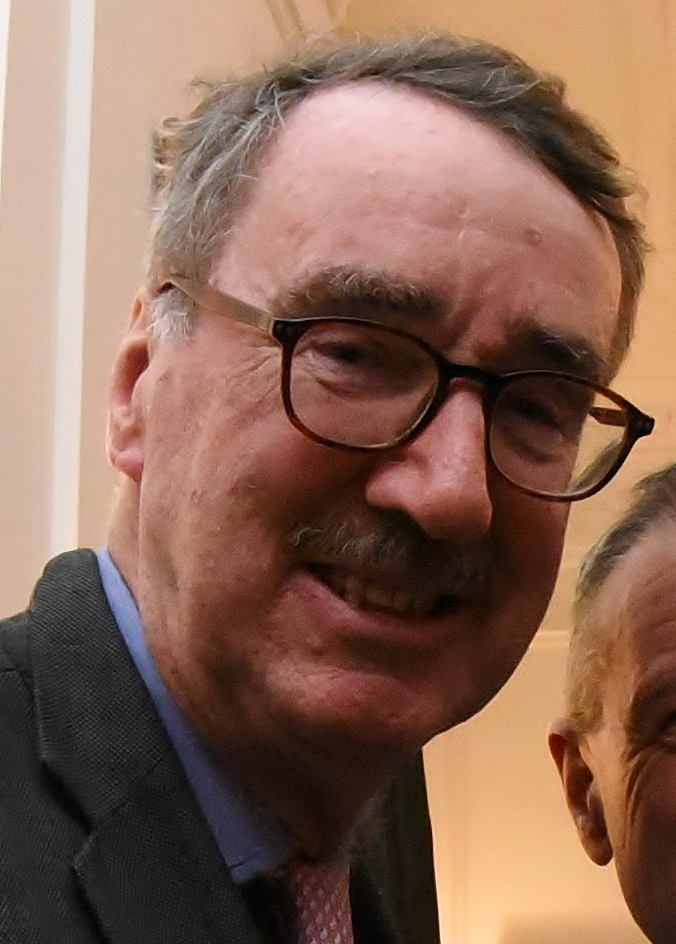

22nd High Commissioner from New Zealand to the United Kingdom
- In office 4 January 1999 – 4 January 2002
- Preceded by: Richard Grant
- Succeeded by: Russell Marshall

32nd Minister of Defence
- In office 1 March 1996 – 5 December 1997
- Prime Minister: Jim Bolger
- Preceded by: Warren Cooper
- Succeeded by: Max Bradford

28th Attorney-General
- In office 2 November 1990 – 5 December 1997
- Prime Minister: Jim Bolger
- Preceded by: David Lange
- Succeeded by: Doug Graham

Member of the New Zealand Parliament for Rotorua
- In office 25 November 1978 – 12 October 1996
- Preceded by: Harry Lapwood
- Succeeded by: Max Bradford
- Majority: 429

Member of the New Zealand Parliament for National Party list
- In office 12 October 1996 – 25 January 1999
- Succeeded by: Alec Neill (Note: Normally, list MPs do not have individual predecessors or successors, but East resigned during a sitting parliament and therefore was succeeded by Neill.)

Personal details
- Born: Paul Clayton East; 4 August 1946 Ōpōtiki, New Zealand
- Died: 27 February 2023 (aged 76) Auckland, New Zealand
- Party: National

Paul Clayton East CNZM KC PC (4 August 1946 – 27 February 2023) was a New Zealand politician of the National Party.

== Early life and family ==
East was born in Ōpōtiki on 4 August 1946, and was educated at King's College, Auckland. He studied at the University of Auckland, graduating with a Bachelor of Laws degree in 1970, and the University of Virginia, where he completed a Master of Laws degree in 1972.

In 1972, East married Marilyn Kottman, and the couple went on to have three children and six grandchildren .

== Early career ==
Before entering Parliament, East worked as a lawyer and a barrister at the Rotorua-based legal firm, East Brewster from 1973 to 1978. East also served as a member of the Rotorua City Council and deputy mayor, and chaired the Roturua Airport Committee between 1977 and 1978. The Roturua City Council was later incorporated into the Rotorua District Council.

== Member of Parliament ==
New Zealand Parliament
Years	Term	Electorate	List	Party
1978–1981	39th	Rotorua		National
1981–1984	40th	Rotorua		National
1984–1987	41st	Rotorua		National
1987–1990	42nd	Rotorua		National
1990–1993	43rd	Rotorua		National
1993–1996	44th	Rotorua		National
1996–1999	45th	List	5	National

East was first elected to Parliament in the 1978 election as MP for Rotorua, and retained that seat until he became a list MP in the 1996 elections after losing a face-off for National's Rotorua nomination to Max Bradford. In 1990, East was awarded the New Zealand 1990 Commemoration Medal.

East served in a number of ministerial roles, including those of Minister of Defence and Attorney-General in the fourth National government. When Jenny Shipley replaced Jim Bolger as leader of the National Party, East was one of the minority who remained aligned with Bolger.

East was appointed a member of the Privy Council in 1998. In 1999, he resigned from Parliament to take up the position of New Zealand High Commissioner to the United Kingdom in London. He was replaced in Parliament by Alec Neill, the next candidate on National's party list.

=== Attorney-general ===
As attorney-general, East advocated on important international issues, including a case brought before the International Court of Justice in 1995 on behalf of New Zealand against France's nuclear testing in the Pacific Ocean. East also headed the development of an advisory opinion to the UN General Assembly on the legality of nuclear testing in 1995. East was awarded the status of Queen's Counsel (QC) while Attorney-General.

== Outside Parliament ==
From 2002, East had been independent chairman of the Charity Gaming Association (CGA), which is the industry organisation for charitable trusts that operate electronic gaming machines ("pokies") to raise funds for community purposes.

In the 2005 Queen's Birthday Honours, East was appointed a Companion of the New Zealand Order of Merit for services to Parliament and the law.

== Death ==
East died in Auckland on 27 February 2023, at the age of 76. Fellow former National MP Chester Borrows also died the same day.

== Notes ==
Diplomatic posts
Preceded by Richard Grant	High Commissioner from New Zealand to the United Kingdom; 1999–2002	Succeeded by Russell Marshall
Political offices
Preceded by David Lange	Attorney-General; 1990–1997	Succeeded by Doug Graham
Preceded by Warren Cooper	Minister of Defence; 1996–1997	Succeeded by Max Bradford
Preceded by Doug Graham	Minister of Corrections; 1996–1997	Succeeded by Nick Smith
New Zealand Parliament
Preceded by Harry Lapwood	Member of Parliament for Rotorua; 1978–1996	Succeeded by Max Bradford
