= South Island Landless Natives Act 1906 =

Act of the Parliament of New Zealand

South Island Landless Natives Act

New Zealand Parliament

Legislative history
- Passed: 1906

Related legislation
- Native Land Act 1909
- Status: Repealed

The South Island Landless Natives Act 1906 (SILNA) was an Act of Parliament passed in New Zealand.

Following the signing of the Treaty of Waitangi in 1840, significant tracts of Māori land were purchased by the Crown.

By 1860 the whole of the South Island had been acquired by the Crown. However, while Ngāi Tahu signed land sale contracts with the Crown for some 34.5 million acres between 1844 and 1864, this amounts to approximately 80 per cent of the land mass of the South Island. The Crown promised set aside 10 per cent of the land purchased for the occupation of the original owners. However, the Crown failed to honour this promise and left South Island Māori insufficient land to support themselves.

In 1879, the Smith–Nairn Royal Commission of Inquiry was established to investigate grievances associated with a number of the Crown's purchases of land from Ngāi Tahu. However, the funding for the commission was halted before the final report could be produced. In 1886, another Royal Commission was undertaken, led by Judge Alexander Mackay. The report found that Ngāi Tahu people needed enough land to generate an income and support themselves and recommended over 200,000 acres in compensation.

Following the passing of the South Island Landless Natives Act 1906, 4064 'landless natives' were allocated 57,000 ha of forested land in the South Island of New Zealand. This amounted to less than 15 hectares per person. The lands allocated were bush and forest lands in remote areas that had not been traditional ancestral domains of South Island tribes. The nature of the land and size of the blocks meant that they were virtually useless in generating a living or income from.

In 1991 the Waitangi Tribunal produced the Ngāi Tahu Land Report. The report stated that "the Crown acted unconscionably and in repeated breach of the Treaty of Waitangi" in its acquisition of Ngāi Tahu land. It went on to state that: "The evidence further establishes that subsequent efforts by the Crown to make good Ngai Tahu's loss were few, extremely dilatory, and largely ineffectual".

== See also ==
- History of New Zealand
