= Max Bradford =

New Zealand politician

The Honourable Max Bradford
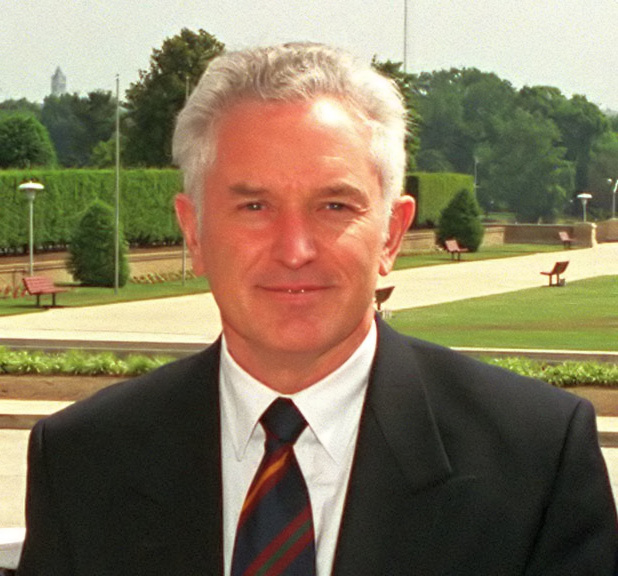
- Bradford in 1999

33rd Minister of Defence
- In office 5 December 1997 – 10 December 1999
- Prime Minister: Jenny Shipley
- Preceded by: Paul East
- Succeeded by: Mark Burton

Personal details
- Born: Maxwell Robert Bradford; 19 January 1942 (age 84) Christchurch, New Zealand
- Party: National
- Spouses: Janet Grieve (m. 1967; div. 1991); Rosemary Young-Rouse
- Relatives: Bill Young (father-in-law); Annabel Young (sister-in-law)

Maxwell Robert Bradford (born 19 January 1942) is a former New Zealand politician and cabinet minister. He was an MP for the National Party from 1990 to 2002. He is best known for introducing the "Bright Future" economic initiative in 1999, and for changes to the retail sector of the electricity industry in 1998.

== Early life and family ==
Bradford was born in Christchurch on 19 January 1942, the son of Robert Herbert Bradford and Ella Marie Bradford (née Patterson). He was educated at Christchurch Boys' High School and the University of Canterbury, from where he graduated with a Bachelor of Commerce degree in 1965, and a Master of Commerce degree with second-class honours in economics the following year.

Between 1967 and 1991, Bradford was married to Janet Grieve. He subsequently married Rosemary Young-Rouse, the daughter of cabinet minister Bill Young, and has two stepdaughters.

Before entering politics, Bradford worked at the New Zealand Treasury, the International Monetary Fund, and the New Zealand Employers Federation. He was chief executive of the NZ Bankers Association and the New Zealand National Party before entering the New Zealand Parliament as an MP in 1990.

== Member of Parliament ==
New Zealand Parliament
Years	Term	Electorate	List	Party
1990–1993	43rd	Tarawera		National
1993–1996	44th	Tarawera		National
1996–1999	45th	Rotorua	none	National
1999–2002	46th	List	15	National

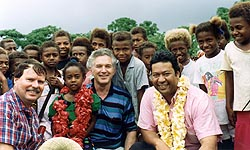
Max Bradford (centre) with Ian Revell and Taito Phillip Field on a working MPs trip to Vanuatu in 1991.

Bradford was first elected to Parliament as MP for Tarawera in the 1990 election, replacing National Party colleague Ian McLean. In the 1996 election, there was an electoral redistribution following the introduction of the Mixed Member Proportional (MMP) electoral system in New Zealand. He contested and won the Rotorua electorate. In the 1999 election, he was defeated in Rotorua by Labour's Steve Chadwick, but remained in Parliament as a list MP. In his political career, he served in a number of Cabinet positions, including Minister of Defence, Minister of Energy, Minister of Labour, Minister of Revenue, Minister of Enterprise and Commerce, Minister of Tertiary Education and Minister of Immigration.

== After politics ==
After retiring from Parliament in 2002, Bradford became a director in Castalia Strategic Advisors Ltd, an international consultancy practice specialising in governance, energy and water reform. In 2007, he established his own consultancy Bradford & Associates Ltd specializing in governance advisory and implementation projects He has consulted for organisations such as the World Bank, the Inter-American Development Bank, the Asian Development Bank and foreign governments, and has worked in Guyana, Liberia, Sudan, Bangladesh, Vietnam, Guinea-Bissau, Haiti, Fiji, and Cambodia amongst other countries.

From 2013 to 2014 he led a World Bank project on behalf of Oxford Policy Management to help improve the effectiveness of the Public Accounts Committee and other financial oversight committees of the Bangladesh Parliament.

In 2013, he was voted New Zealand's best energy minister in recent years.

He retired in 2015.

New Zealand Parliament
Preceded by Ian McLean	Member of Parliament for Tarawera; 1990–1996	Constituency abolished
Preceded by Paul East	Member of Parliament for Rotorua; 1996–1999	Succeeded by Steve Chadwick
