= Simon Power (politician) =

New Zealand politician

The Honourable Simon Power QSO
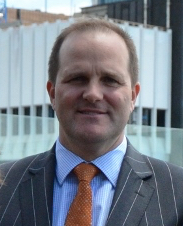
- Power in 2013

46th Minister of Justice
- In office 19 November 2008 – 12 December 2011
- Prime Minister: John Key
- Preceded by: Annette King
- Succeeded by: Judith Collins

Minister of State Owned Enterprises
- In office 19 November 2008 – 13 April 2011
- Prime Minister: John Key
- Preceded by: Trevor Mallard
- Succeeded by: Tony Ryall

9th Minister of Commerce
- In office 19 November 2008 – 12 December 2011
- Prime Minister: John Key
- Preceded by: Lianne Dalziel
- Succeeded by: Craig Foss

Deputy Leader of the House
- In office 19 November 2008 – December 2011
- Prime Minister: John Key
- Preceded by: Darren Hughes
- Succeeded by: Anne Tolley

Member of the New Zealand Parliament for Rangitikei
- In office 1999 – December 2011
- Preceded by: Denis Marshall
- Succeeded by: Ian McKelvie

Personal details
- Born: 5 December 1969 (age 56) New Zealand
- Party: National
- Profession: Lawyer

Simon James Power QSO (born 5 December 1969) is a New Zealand chief executive and former politician.

Power was elected to the New Zealand House of Representatives in 1999 as the Member of Parliament for Rangitīkei. A member of the National Party, he served as Minister of Justice, Minister of Commerce and Consumer Affairs, and Minister for State Owned Enterprises in the first term of the Fifth National Government from 2008 until 2011. His retirement from politics was considered a surprise.

After leaving Parliament, Power worked for ten years at Westpac, including as acting chief executive. He was chief executive of TVNZ from 2022 to 2023, during the period when it was floated that the state-owned television network merge with Radio New Zealand. Since 2024 he has been chief executive of investment firm Fisher Funds.

== Early years ==
Power was educated in Palmerston North, attending St Peter's College from 1981-1987. While at St Peter's, he captained two senior sports teams and chaired the School Council. He later studied at Victoria University of Wellington, gaining a Bachelor of Arts degree in political science in 1992 and then a Bachelor of Laws degree in 1993. He served as president of the Victoria University Law Students' Society for two years.

After leaving university, Power worked as a lawyer for Fitzherbert Rowe in Palmerston North, and for a brief period for Kensington Swan in Auckland. In 1998, he decided to enter national politics. Having been a member of the National Party since the year he left university, he secured the party's nomination for Rangitikei, a predominantly rural area just outside Palmerston North. The incumbent, National MP Denis Marshall, retired from Parliament in 1999.

== Member of Parliament ==
New Zealand Parliament
Years	Term	Electorate	List	Party
1999–2002	46th	Rangitikei	37	National
2002–2005	47th	Rangitikei	13	National
2005–2008	48th	Rangitikei	3	National
2008–2011	49th	Rangitīkei	4	National

In the 1999 election, Power won Rangitikei. He defeated his opponent, the Labour Party's Craig Walsham, by slightly under three hundred votes. Once in parliament, Power became his party's spokesman on Labour, Industrial Relations, and Youth Affairs. After he retained his seat in the 2002 election, these roles were swapped for Justice, Tertiary Education, and Workplace Skills. In 2003, when Don Brash became leader of the National Party, Power's responsibilities were once again reshuffled, giving him the portfolios of Defence, Veterans' Affairs, and Youth Affairs.

In May 2004, Power caused controversy for his statement that (as regards defence and foreign affairs) "where Britain, the United States and Australia go, we go". Power later expressed regret for how the statement was interpreted, and party leader Don Brash said that it did not reflect National Party policy. In August of the same year, Power was moved from the defence position to that of chief whip.

Between 2005 and 2008, Power was Opposition Spokesperson on Law and Order and repeatedly called for an inquiry into the management of the Corrections Department. A few months before the election in 2008, Parliament's Law & Order Select Committee agreed to hold a wide-ranging inquiry. When National won the election in 2008, Power was appointed Minister of Justice. He also served as Minister of Commerce and Consumer Affairs, Minister for State Owned Enterprises, and Deputy Leader of the House.

Power was picked as the 2010 politician of the year by the Trans Tasman political newsletter.

== Life after Parliament ==
On 2 March 2011 Power announced he would step down at the end of the term in late 2011. In April 2011, Power's ministerial portfolio for State-Owned Enterprises was transferred to Tony Ryall in preparation for Power's transition into business; he wanted to avoid potential conflicts of interest.

In December 2011 Power was granted the right to retain the title of The Honourable in recognition of his term as a Member of the Executive Council of New Zealand and became The Hon. Simon Power. In January 2012 he became the head of the bank Westpac New Zealand's Private Bank. In the 2012 Queen's Birthday Honours Power was appointed a Companion of the Queen's Service Order (QSO) for services as a Member of Parliament.

Power served as the chairman of the King's College Board of Governors, during which time he had to deal with accusations of bullying at the school due to the scandal regarding National Party MP Sam Uffindell's time at the school.

In 2019 Power completed a master's degree in political science at Victoria University of Wellington, with a thesis comparing two US elections.

In late December 2021, Power was appointed as the chief executive of the public broadcaster TVNZ. Power had recently stepped down as acting chief of Westpac Bank when the bank appointed Catherine McGrath as chief executive in November 2021. Power began the role in March 2022.

On 4 April 2023 Power announced his resignation from TVNZ with his last day being the 30th June.

Power told an interviewer in July 2023 that part of the reason he had left TVNZ was to commence research for his PhD in American politics. Power said that he planned to holiday in "...California, Washington DC and New York..." then undertake archival research "...focusing on four U.S. Presidents and their paths as governors or through the Senate." He returned to the financial industry in February 2024 as chief executive of Fisher Funds.

New Zealand Parliament
Preceded by Denis Marshall	Member of Parliament for Rangitikei; 1999–2011	Succeeded by Ian McKelvie
Political offices
Preceded by Annette King	Minister of Justice; 2008–2011	Succeeded by Judith Collins
Preceded by Lianne Dalziel	Minister of Commerce; 2008–2011	Succeeded by Craig Foss
