= Shadow Cabinet of Jim McLay =

New Zealand shadow cabinet (1984–1986)

New Zealand political leader Jim McLay assembled a "shadow cabinet" system amongst the National caucus following his election to the position of Leader of the Opposition in 1984. He composed this of individuals who acted for the party as spokespeople in assigned roles while he was Leader of the Opposition (1984–86). McLay was plagued by interference from previous leader Robert Muldoon, who was denied a place on National's frontbench which he desired, unlike McLay who wished him to retire to the backbenches as an 'elder statesmen'.

As the National Party formed the largest party not in government at the time, the frontbench team was as a result the Official Opposition of the New Zealand House of Representatives.

== List of shadow ministers ==
Portfolio	Minister	Start	End
Leader	Jim McLay	29 November 1984	26 March 1986
Deputy Leader	Jim Bolger	29 November 1984	26 March 1986
Agriculture	Ian McLean	29 November 1984	10 February 1986
Agriculture	Jim Bolger	10 February 1986	26 March 1986
Attorney-General	Jim McLay	29 November 1984	29 January 1985
Attorney-General	Paul East	29 January 1985	26 March 1986
Defence	Doug Kidd	29 November 1984	26 March 1986
Education	Robin Gray	29 November 1984	29 January 1985
Education	Ruth Richardson	29 January 1985	26 March 1986
Finance	John Falloon	29 November 1984	29 January 1985
Finance	Bill Birch	29 January 1985	10 February 1986
Finance	Michael Cox	10 February 1986	26 March 1986
Foreign Affairs	Warren Cooper	29 November 1984	29 January 1985
Foreign Affairs	Jim McLay	29 January 1985	8 August 1985
Foreign Affairs	Warren Cooper	8 August 1985	26 March 1986
Health	Merv Wellington	29 November 1984	29 January 1985
Health	Philip Burdon	29 January 1985	10 February 1986
Health	George Gair	10 February 1986	26 March 1986
Internal Affairs	Jim Gerard	29 November 1984	29 January 1985
Internal Affairs	Graeme Lee	29 January 1985	26 March 1986
Justice	Jim McLay	29 November 1984	29 January 1985
Justice	Paul East	29 January 1985	26 March 1986
Labour	Jim Bolger	29 November 1984	29 January 1985
Labour	George Gair	29 January 1985	10 February 1986
Labour	Bill Birch	10 February 1986	26 March 1986
Maori Affairs	Winston Peters	29 November 1984	26 March 1986
Overseas Trade	Warren Cooper	29 November 1984	29 January 1985
Overseas Trade	John Falloon	29 January 1985	26 March 1986
Trade and Industry	Philip Burdon	29 November 1984	29 January 1985
Trade and Industry	Jim Bolger	29 January 1985	10 February 1986
Trade and Industry	Ian McLean	10 February 1986	26 March 1986
Transport	George Gair	29 November 1984	29 January 1985
Transport	Winston Peters	29 January 1985	26 March 1986
Works	Robin Gray	29 January 1985	26 March 1986

== Frontbench teams ==
The list below contains a list of McLays's shadow ministers and their respective roles. McLay initially retained the lineup he inherited from previous leader Sir Robert Muldoon when he became leader in November 1984. The only changes made were Muldoon relinquishing the Finance portfolio which was given to John Falloon.

=== January 1985 ===
McLay announced his first shadow cabinet in January 1985.

Rank	Shadow Minister	Portfolio
1	Hon Jim McLay	Leader of the Opposition; Shadow Minister of Foreign Affairs
2	Hon Jim Bolger	Deputy Leader of the Opposition; Shadow Minister of Trade and Industry
3	Hon Bill Birch	Shadow Minister of Finance
4	Hon George Gair	Shadow Minister of Labour; Shadow Minister of Employment
5	Hon Warren Cooper	Shadow Minister of National Development; Shadow Minister of Regional Development; Shadow Minister of Resource allocation Shadow Minister of Industrial development Shadow Minister of South Island development
6	Hon Venn Young	Shadow Minister of Social Welfare; Shadow Minister of Civilian rehabilitation Shadow Minister of ACC
7	Hon John Falloon	Shadow Minister of Overseas trade Shadow Minister of Expenditure
8	Ian McLean	Shadow Minister of Agriculture
9	Hon Tony Friedlander	Shadow Minister of Energy
10	Hon Merv Wellington	Shadow Minister of Local Government; Shadow Minister of Urban issues
11	Don McKinnon	Senior Whip; Shadow Minister of Industrial Relations
12	Michael Cox	Junior Whip; Shadow Minister of Customs; Shadow Minister of Revenue
13	Robin Gray	Shadow Minister of Works and Development
14	Doug Kidd	Shadow Minister of Defence; Shadow Minister of Fisheries; Shadow Minister of Aquaculture
15	Paul East	Shadow Attorney-General; Shadow Minister of Justice; Shadow Minister of Constitutional Issues; Shadow Minister of Official Information
16	Bruce Townshend	Shadow Minister of State Services; Shadow Minister of State Corporations; Shadow Minister of Immigration
17	Rt Hon Sir Robert Muldoon	no portfolio
18	Jack Luxton	Shadow Minister of Foreign Relations; Shadow Minister of Pacific Island Affairs
19	Winston Peters	Shadow Minister of Maori Affairs; Shadow Minister of Transport; Shadow Minister of Railways; Shadow Minister of Civil Aviation and Meteorological services
20	Ruth Richardson	Shadow Minister of Education
21	Philip Burdon	Shadow Minister of Health
22	John Banks	Shadow Minister of Tourism; Shadow Minister of Publicity; Shadow Minister of Sport and Recreation
23	Roger McClay	Shadow Minister of Housing; Shadow Minister of the Environment
24	Graeme Lee	Shadow Minister of Internal Affairs; Shadow Minister on Civil Defence; Shadow Minister of EQC; Shadow Minister of Wildlife; Shadow Minister of Drug Misuse
25	Norman Jones	Shadow Minister of Police; Shadow Minister of War Pensions and Rehabilitation
26	Neill Austin	Shadow Minister of Lands; Shadow Minister of Valuation
27	Rex Austin	Shadow Minister of Apiculture
28	Rob Talbot	Shadow Minister of Horticulture
29	Derek Angus	Shadow Minister of Forests
30	Simon Upton	Shadow Minister of the Arts; Shadow Minister of Science and Technology
31	Jim Gerard	Shadow Minister of Broadcasting; Shadow Minister of Public Trust; Shadow Minister of Racing
32	Doug Graham	Shadow Minister of Disarmament
33	Denis Marshall	Associate Shadow Minister of Agriculture
34	Roger Maxwell	Shadow Postmaster General; Shadow Minister of State Insurance
35	Katherine O'Regan	Shadow Minister of Consumer Affairs; Shadow Minister of Statistics
36	Dr Lockwood Smith	Shadow Minister of Marketing
37	Rob Storey	Shadow Minister of Diversification; Shadow Minister of Rural Banking

=== August 1985 ===
McLay reshuffled his shadow cabinet in August 1985 to accommodate Maurice McTigue, after he won the Timaru by-election, and reflect Rob Talbot who had requested not to have a portfolio as he intended to retire at the next election.

Rank	Shadow Minister	Portfolio
1	Hon Jim McLay	Leader of the Opposition
2	Hon Jim Bolger	Deputy Leader of the Opposition; Shadow Minister of Trade and Industry
3	Hon Bill Birch	Shadow Minister of Finance
4	Hon George Gair	Shadow Minister of Labour; Shadow Minister of Employment
5	Hon Warren Cooper	Shadow Minister of Foreign Affairs; Shadow Minister of Regional Development; Shadow Minister of Resource allocation Shadow Minister of Industrial development Shadow Minister of South Island development
6	Hon Venn Young	Shadow Minister of Social Welfare; Shadow Minister of Civilian rehabilitation Shadow Minister of ACC
7	Hon John Falloon	Shadow Minister of Overseas trade Shadow Minister of Expenditure; Associate Shadow Minister of Finance
8	Ian McLean	Shadow Minister of Agriculture
9	Hon Tony Friedlander	Shadow Minister of Energy
10	Hon Merv Wellington	Shadow Minister of Local Government; Shadow Minister of Urban issues
11	Don McKinnon	Senior Whip; Associate Shadow Minister of State Corporations
12	Robin Gray	Junior Whip; Shadow Minister of Works and Development
13	Michael Cox	Shadow Minister of Customs; Shadow Minister of Revenue
14	Doug Kidd	Shadow Minister of Defence; Shadow Minister of Fisheries; Shadow Minister of Aquaculture
15	Paul East	Shadow Attorney-General; Shadow Minister of Justice; Shadow Minister of Constitutional Issues; Shadow Minister of Official Information
16	Bruce Townshend	Shadow Minister of State Services; Shadow Minister of Immigration
17	Rt Hon Sir Robert Muldoon	no portfolio
18	Jack Luxton	Shadow Minister of Foreign Relations; Shadow Minister of Pacific Island Affairs
19	Winston Peters	Shadow Minister of Maori Affairs; Shadow Minister of Transport; Shadow Minister of Railways; Shadow Minister of Civil Aviation and Meteorological services
20	Ruth Richardson	Shadow Minister of Education
21	Philip Burdon	Shadow Minister of Health
22	John Banks	Shadow Minister of Tourism; Shadow Minister of Publicity; Shadow Minister of Sport and Recreation
23	Roger McClay	Shadow Minister of Housing
24	Graeme Lee	Shadow Minister of Internal Affairs; Shadow Minister on Civil Defence; Shadow Minister for EQC; Shadow Minister of Wildlife; Shadow Minister of Drug Misuse
25	Norman Jones	Shadow Minister of Police; Shadow Minister of War Pensions and Rehabilitation
26	Neill Austin	Shadow Minister of Lands; Shadow Minister of Valuation
27	Rex Austin	Associate Shadow Minister of Apiculture
28	Derek Angus	Shadow Minister of Forests
29	Simon Upton	Shadow Minister of the Environment; Shadow Minister of the Arts; Shadow Minister of Science and Technology
30	Jim Gerard	Shadow Minister of Broadcasting; Shadow Minister of Public Trust; Shadow Minister of Racing
31	Doug Graham	Shadow Minister of Disarmament
32	Denis Marshall	Associate Shadow Minister of Agriculture
33	Roger Maxwell	Shadow Postmaster General; Shadow Minister of State Insurance
34	Katherine O'Regan	Shadow Minister of Consumer Affairs; Shadow Minister of Statistics
35	Dr Lockwood Smith	Shadow Minister of Marketing
36	Rob Storey	Associate Shadow Minister of Agriculture
37	Maurice McTigue	Shadow Minister of Irrigation
38	Rob Talbot	no portfolio

=== February 1986 ===
McLay announced a major reshuffle in February 1986. He demoted Muldoon and Merv Wellington to the lowest and third lowest rankings for disloyalty and also promoted several MPs to the frontbench at the expense of Bill Birch and George Gair, which would cause destabilization in the caucus.

Rank	Shadow Minister	Portfolio
1	Hon Jim McLay	Leader of the Opposition
2	Hon Jim Bolger	Deputy Leader of the Opposition; Shadow Minister of Agriculture
3	Hon Warren Cooper	Shadow Minister of Foreign Affairs; Shadow Minister of Regional Development; Shadow Minister of Resource allocation Shadow Minister of South Island development
4	Hon Venn Young	Shadow Minister of Social Welfare; Shadow Minister of Civilian rehabilitation
5	Ian McLean	Shadow Minister of Trade and Industry; Shadow Minister of Economic Development; Shadow Minister of Industrial Development
6	Michael Cox	Shadow Minister of Finance
7	Doug Kidd	Shadow Minister of Defence; Shadow Minister of National Development
8	Ruth Richardson	Shadow Minister of Education; Shadow Minister for Youth
9	Paul East	Shadow Attorney-General; Shadow Minister of Justice; Shadow Minister of Constitutional Issues; Shadow Minister of Official Information
10	Hon John Falloon	Shadow Minister of Overseas trade Shadow Minister for the Audit Department; Associate Shadow Minister of Finance
11	Hon George Gair	Shadow Minister of Health
12	Hon Bill Birch	Shadow Minister of Labour; Shadow Minister of Employment
13	Don McKinnon	Senior Whip; Associate Shadow Minister for State Corporations
14	Robin Gray	Junior Whip; Shadow Minister of Works and Development
15	John Banks	Shadow Minister of Local Government; Shadow Minister of Tourism; Shadow Minister of Publicity; Shadow Minister of Sport and Recreation
16	Philip Burdon	Shadow Minister of Customs
17	Roger McClay	Shadow Minister of Housing
18	Hon Tony Friedlander	Shadow Minister of Energy
19	Simon Upton	Shadow Minister for the Environment; Shadow Minister of the Arts; Shadow Minister of Science and Technology
20	Winston Peters	Shadow Minister of Maori Affairs; Shadow Minister of Transport; Shadow Minister of Railways; Shadow Minister of Civil Aviation and Meteorological services
21	Norman Jones	Shadow Minister of Police; Shadow Minister of War Pensions and Rehabilitation
22	Neill Austin	Shadow Minister of Lands; Shadow Minister of Valuation; Shadow Minister of Fishiries; Shadow Minister of Aquaculture
23	Graeme Lee	Shadow Minister of Internal Affairs; Shadow Minister on Civil Defence; Shadow Minister of Earthquake and War Damage; Shadow Minister of Wildlife; Shadow Minister of Drug Misuse
24	Bruce Townshend	Shadow Minister of Immigration
25	Derek Angus	Shadow Minister of Forests
26	Doug Graham	Shadow Minister of Revenue; Shadow Minister for Disarmament
27	Rob Storey	Shadow Minister for Rural Banking; Shadow Minister of Horticulture
28	Roger Maxwell	Shadow Postmaster General; Shadow Minister of State Insurance
29	Jim Gerard	Shadow Minister of Broadcasting; Shadow Minister of Public Trust; Shadow Minister of Racing
30	Denis Marshall	Associate Shadow Minister of Agriculture
31	Katherine O'Regan	Shadow Minister of Consumer Affairs; Shadow Minister of Statistics
32	Dr Lockwood Smith	Shadow Minister of Marketing
33	Maurice McTigue	Shadow Minister of Irrigation
34	Jack Luxton	Shadow Minister of Foreign Relations; Shadow Minister of Pacific Island Affairs
35	Rex Austin	Shadow Minister of Apiculture
36	Rob Talbot	no portfolio
37	Hon Merv Wellington	Shadow Minister for ACC
38	Rt Hon Sir Robert Muldoon	no portfolio
