= Second Shadow Cabinet of Robert Muldoon =

New Zealand shadow cabinet (July–November 1984)

New Zealand political leader Robert Muldoon assembled a "shadow cabinet" within the National Party caucus after his transition to the position of Leader of the Opposition in 1984 following National's defeat at the 1984 election. He composed this of individuals who acted for the party as spokespeople in assigned roles while he was Leader of the Opposition.

As the National Party formed the largest party not in government at the time, the frontbench team was as a result the Official Opposition within the New Zealand House of Representatives.

Robert Muldoon's shadow cabinet lasted for only four months, ending when he was replaced as Leader of the National Party by his deputy, Jim McLay, in November 1984.

== Frontbench team ==
The list below contains a list of Muldoon's shadow ministers and their respective roles.

Rank	Shadow Minister	Portfolio
1	Rt Hon Sir Robert Muldoon	Leader of the Opposition; Shadow Minister of Finance
2	Hon Jim McLay	Deputy Leader of the Opposition; Shadow Minister of Justice; Shadow Attorney-General
3	Hon Bill Birch	Shadow Minister of Energy; Shadow Minister of National Development
4	Hon Jim Bolger	Shadow Minister of Labour; Shadow Minister of Employment
5	Hon George Gair	Shadow Minister of Transport; Shadow Minister of Railways; Shadow Minister of Civil Aviation; Shadow Minister of Meteorological Services
6	Hon Warren Cooper	Shadow Minister of Foreign Affairs; Shadow Minister of Overseas Trade
7	Hon Venn Young	Shadow Minister of Social Welfare
8	Hon Merv Wellington	Shadow Minister of Health
9	Hon John Falloon	Shadow Minister of Financial Development; Shadow Minister of Corporations
10	Jack Luxton	Shadow Minister of Foreign Relations
11	Rex Austin	Associate Shadow Minister of Agriculture
12	Don McKinnon	Senior Whip; Shadow Minister of Public Corporations
13	Michael Cox	Junior Whip; Shadow Minister of Revenue
14	Neill Austin	Shadow Minister of Fishing
15	Paul East	Shadow Minister of Commerce; Shadow Minister of Customs
16	Robin Gray	Shadow Minister of Education
17	Doug Kidd	Shadow Minister of Defence; Shadow Minister of War Pensions; Shadow Minister of Rehabilitation
18	Ian McLean	Shadow Minister of Agriculture; Shadow Minister of Rural Banking
19	Bruce Townshend	Shadow Minister of Lands; Shadow Minister of Valuation
20	Winston Peters	Shadow Minister of Maori Affairs; Shadow Minister of Consumer Affairs; Shadow Minister of Marketing
21	Derek Angus	Shadow Minister of Forests
22	John Banks	Shadow Minister of Regional Development
23	Philip Burdon	Shadow Minister of Industry
24	Graeme Lee	Shadow Minister of Local Government
25	Roger McClay	Shadow Minister of Immigration; Shadow Minister of Islands Affairs
26	Ruth Richardson	Shadow Minister of Horticulture
27	Simon Upton	Shadow Minister of Science & Technology
28	Jim Gerard	Shadow Minister of Internal Affairs; Shadow Minister of Sport and Recreation
29	Doug Graham	Shadow Minister of the Arts; Shadow Minister of Insurance; Shadow Minister of EQC
30	Denis Marshall	Associate Shadow Minister of Agriculture
31	Roger Maxwell	Associate Shadow Minister of Agriculture
32	Katherine O'Regan	Shadow Minister of Women's Affairs; Shadow Postmaster-General
33	Dr Lockwood Smith	Shadow Minister of Broadcasting
34	Rob Storey	Shadow Minister of the Environment
