= Shadow Cabinet of Jim Bolger =

New Zealand shadow cabinet (1986–1990)

New Zealand political leader Jim Bolger assembled a "shadow cabinet" within the National Party caucus after his election to the position of Leader of the Opposition in 1986. He composed this of individuals who acted for the party as spokespeople in assigned roles while he was Leader of the Opposition (1986–90).

As the National Party formed the largest party not in government at the time, the frontbench team was as a result the Official Opposition within the New Zealand House of Representatives.

== List of shadow ministers ==
Portfolio	Minister	Start	End
Leader	Jim Bolger	26 March 1986	2 November 1990
Deputy Leader	George Gair	26 March 1986	10 September 1987
Deputy Leader	Don McKinnon	10 September 1987	2 November 1990
Agriculture	John Falloon	26 March 1986	2 November 1990
Attorney-General	Jim McLay	29 November 1984	11 September 1987
Attorney-General	Paul East	11 September 1987	2 November 1990
Defence	Doug Kidd	29 November 1984	11 September 1987
Defence	Don McKinnon	11 September 1987	2 November 1990
Education	Ruth Richardson	29 November 1984	11 September 1987
Education	Lockwood Smith	11 September 1987	2 November 1990
Finance	George Gair	26 March 1986	11 September 1987
Finance	Ruth Richardson	11 September 1987	2 November 1990
Foreign Affairs	Robert Muldoon	29 November 1984	11 September 1987
Foreign Affairs	Jim Bolger	11 September 1987	2 November 1990
Health	Paul East	29 November 1984	11 September 1987
Health	Don McKinnon	11 September 1987	2 November 1990
Internal Affairs	Graeme Lee	29 November 1984	2 November 1990
Justice	Jim McLay	29 November 1984	11 September 1987
Justice	Paul East	11 September 1987	2 November 1990
Maori Affairs	Winston Peters	26 March 1986	2 November 1990
Overseas Trade	Warren Cooper	29 November 1984	2 November 1990
Trade and Industry	Philip Burdon	29 November 1984	2 November 1990
Transport	Winston Peters	29 November 1984	11 September 1987
Transport	Warren Cooper	11 September 1987	11 February 1990
Transport	Maurice McTigue	11 February 1990	2 November 1990
Works	Neill Austin	29 November 1984	2 June 1987
Works	Tony Friedlander	2 June 1987	11 September 1987
Works	Ian McLean	11 September 1987	11 February 1990
Works	Maurice McTigue	11 February 1990	2 November 1990

== Frontbench teams ==
The lists below contains an outlay of Bolger's shadow ministers and their respective roles.

=== April 1986 ===
Bolger announced his first shadow cabinet in April 1986 just over a week after he replaced Jim McLay as party leader. He made significant changes, particularly a rapprochement with Sir Robert Muldoon who accepted the Foreign Affairs portfolio.

A minor reshuffle occurred in June 1987, shortly before the end of the parliament, caused by the death of Bruce Townshend and retirements of Norman Jones and Neill Austin. The state services portfolio was given to Bill Birch, immigration to Venn Young, works to Tony Friedlander and Don McKinnon given police, war pensions, and rehabilitation. Jones and Austin remained associate spokesmen until the election.

Rank	Shadow Minister	Portfolio
1	Hon Jim Bolger	Leader of the Opposition
2	Hon George Gair	Deputy Leader of the Opposition; Shadow Minister of Finance
3	Hon Bill Birch	Shadow Minister of Labour; Shadow Minister of Employment; Shadow Leader of the House
4	Hon Warren Cooper	Shadow Minister of Overseas Trade; Shadow Minister of Local Government; Shadow Minister of Regional Development; Shadow Minister of South Island Development
5	Hon Venn Young	Shadow Minister of Social Welfare
6	Hon John Falloon	Shadow Minister of Agriculture
7	Michael Cox	Shadow Minister of Customs; Shadow Minister for the Audit Department
8	Rt Hon Sir Robert Muldoon	Shadow Minister of Foreign Affairs
9	Hon Tony Friedlander	Shadow Minister of Energy
10	Hon Jim McLay	Shadow Attorney-General; Shadow Minister of Justice
11	Paul East	Shadow Minister of Health
12	Ruth Richardson	Shadow Minister of Education; Shadow Minister for Youth Issues
13	Philip Burdon	Shadow Minister of Trade and Industry
14	Ian McLean	Shadow Minister of Forests; Shadow Minister of Lands; Shadow Minister of State Corporations; Shadow Minister of National Development
15	Winston Peters	Shadow Minister of Maori Affairs; Shadow Minister of Transport; Shadow Minister of Railways; Shadow Minister of Civic Aviation
16	Doug Kidd	Shadow Minister of Defence; Shadow Minister of Fisheries; Shadow Minister of Aquaculture
17	Bruce Townshend	Shadow Minister of Immigration; Shadow Minister of State Services
18	John Banks	Shadow Minister of Tourism; Shadow Minister of Publicity; Shadow Minister of Sport and Recreation
19	Roger McClay	Shadow Minister of Housing
20	Simon Upton	Shadow Minister of Conservation; Shadow Minister for the Environment; Shadow Minister for the Arts; Shadow Minister for Science and Technology
21	Norman Jones	Shadow Minister of Police; Shadow Minister of War Pensions and Rehabilitation
22	Neill Austin	Shadow Minister of Works
23	Graeme Lee	Shadow Minister of Internal Affairs; Shadow Minister of Civil Defence; Shadow Minister for EQC
24	Derek Angus	Associate Shadow Minister of Agriculture
25	Doug Graham	Shadow Minister of Revenue; Shadow Minister of Disarmament
26	Rob Storey	Shadow Minister of Horticulture; Shadow Minister for Rural Banking
27	Roger Maxwell	Shadow Postmaster-General; Shadow Minister of Consumer Affairs; Shadow Minister of State Insurance
28	Jim Gerard	Shadow Minister of Broadcasting; Shadow Minister of Racing
29	Denis Marshall	Associate Shadow Minister of Agriculture
30	Katherine O'Regan	Shadow Minister of Women's Affairs; Shadow Minister of Statistics
31	Dr Lockwood Smith	Shadow Minister of Marketing
32	Maurice McTigue	Shadow Minister of Irrigation
33	Rex Austin	Associate Shadow Minister of Maori Affairs
34	Jack Luxton	Shadow Minister of Foreign Relations; Shadow Minister of Pacific Island Affairs
35	Hon Merv Wellington	Shadow Minister for ACC
36	Rob Talbot	Associate Shadow Postmaster-General
	Don McKinnon	Senior Whip
	Robin Gray	Junior Whip

=== September 1987 ===
Bolger reshuffled his shadow cabinet on 11 September 1987 following National's defeat at the 1987 general election. The first twenty members are given rankings with an extended group of junior members who are unranked.

Rank	Shadow Minister	Portfolio
1	Hon Jim Bolger	Leader of the Opposition; Shadow Minister of Foreign Affairs
2	Don McKinnon	Deputy Leader of the Opposition; Shadow Minister of Health; Shadow Minister of Defense
3	Hon Bill Birch	Shadow Leader of the House; Shadow Minister of Labour; Shadow Minister of State Services; Shadow Minister of Immigration; Shadow Minister of Pacific Island Affairs
4	Ruth Richardson	Shadow Minister of Finance
5	Paul East	Shadow Attorney-General; Shadow Minister of Justice; Shadow Minister for Constitutional Issues
6	Hon John Falloon	Shadow Minister of Agriculture; Shadow Minister of Rural Affairs
7	Doug Kidd	Shadow Minister of Fisheries; Shadow Minister of Regional Development; Shadow Minister of Revenue
8	Winston Peters	Shadow Minister of Maori Affairs; Shadow Minister of Employment
9	Philip Burdon	Shadow Minister of Trade and Industry; Shadow Minister of Customs
10	Simon Upton	Shadow Minister for the Arts; Shadow Minister for Science and Technology
11	Ian McLean	Shadow Postmaster-General; Shadow Minister of State Owned Enterprises; Shadow Minister of Forests & Lands; Shadow Minister of Works
12	Hon Warren Cooper	Shadow Minister of Overseas Trade; Shadow Minister of Transport
13	John Banks	Shadow Minister of Tourism; Shadow Minister of Police; Shadow Minister of Sport and Recreation
14	Doug Graham	Shadow Minister of Disarmament; Shadow Minister of Broadcasting
15	Dr Lockwood Smith	Shadow Minister of Education
16	Hon Venn Young	Shadow Minister of Social Welfare; Shadow Minister of Consumer Affairs; Shadow Minister of Statistics
17	Roger McClay	Shadow Minister of Housing; Shadow Minister for the Environment; Shadow Minister of Conservation
18	Katherine O'Regan	Shadow Minister of Women's Affairs; Shadow Minister of Youth Affairs
19	Graeme Lee	Shadow Minister of Internal Affairs; Shadow Minister of Civil Defence; Shadow Minister of Local Government; Shadow Minister for Drug Misuse
20	Hon Merv Wellington	Shadow Minister of Energy
	Hon George Gair	Shadow Minister of ACC
	Derek Angus	Shadow Minister of Forests; Associate Shadow Minister of Lands
	Rob Storey	Associate Shadow Minister of Overseas Trade; Associate Shadow Minister of Transport
	Roger Maxwell	Associate Shadow Minister of Employment; Associate Shadow Minister of State Services; Associate Shadow Minister of Labour; Associate Shadow Minister of Immigration
	Jim Gerard	Associate Shadow Minister of Social Welfare; Associate Shadow Minister of Consumer Affairs; Associate Shadow Minister of Statistics
	Denis Marshall	Associate Shadow Minister of Agriculture; Associate Shadow Minister of Rural Affairs
	Robin Gray	Senior Whip
	Maurice McTigue	Junior Whip

=== February 1990 ===
Bolger announced a major reshuffle on 11 February 1990 ahead of the general election later that year and to reflect the MPs who were intending to retire at the election.

Rank	Shadow Minister	Portfolio
1	Hon Jim Bolger	Leader of the Opposition; Shadow Minister of Foreign Affairs
2	Don McKinnon	Deputy Leader of the Opposition; Shadow Minister of Health; Shadow Minister of Defense
3	Hon Bill Birch	Shadow Leader of the House; Shadow Minister of Labour; Shadow Minister of State Services; Shadow Minister of Immigration; Shadow Minister of Pacific Island Affairs
4	Ruth Richardson	Shadow Minister of Finance
5	Paul East	Shadow Attorney-General; Shadow Minister of Justice
6	Hon John Falloon	Shadow Minister of Agriculture
7	Doug Kidd	Shadow Minister for State Owned Enterprises; Shadow Minister of Fisheries; Shadow Minister of Forests; Shadow Minister of Lands
8	Philip Burdon	Shadow Minister of Trade and Industry; Shadow Minister of Customs; Shadow Minister of Commerce
9	Simon Upton	Shadow Minister for the Arts; Shadow Minister for Science and Technology
10	John Banks	Shadow Minister of Police; Shadow Minister of Employment; Shadow Minister of Sport and Recreation
11	Jenny Shipley	Shadow Minister of Social Welfare
12	Hon Warren Cooper	Shadow Minister of Overseas Trade; Shadow Minister of Tourism
13	Winston Peters	Shadow Minister of Maori Affairs
14	Doug Graham	Shadow Minister of Revenue; Shadow Minister of Disarmament; Shadow Minister for Constitutional Issues
15	Dr Lockwood Smith	Shadow Minister of Education
16	Maurice McTigue	Shadow Minister of Transport; Shadow Minister of Works
17	Rob Storey	Shadow Minister for the Environment
18	Katherine O'Regan	Shadow Minister of Women's Affairs; Shadow Minister of Family Affairs
19	Graeme Lee	Shadow Minister of Internal Affairs; Shadow Minister of Civil Defence; Shadow Minister of Local Government; Shadow Minister for Drug Misuse
20	Denis Marshall	Shadow Minister of Conservation; Shadow Minister of Horticulture
21	Roger Maxwell	Shadow Postmaster-General; Shadow Minister of Consumer Affairs; Shadow Minister of Regional Development
22	Jim Gerard	Shadow Minister of Housing; Shadow Minister of Broadcasting; Shadow Minister of Racing
23	John Luxton	Shadow Minister of Energy
24	Maurice Williamson	Associate Shadow Minister of Science and Technology; Associate Shadow Minister of Labour
25	Murray McCully	Shadow Minister for Electoral Reform
26	Rob Munro	Associate Shadow Minister of Defence
27	Robin Gray	Senior Whip
28	Roger McClay	Junior Whip; Associate Shadow Minister of Education
29	Rt Hon Sir Robert Muldoon	no portfolio
30	Robert Anderson	Associate Shadow Minister of Horticulture
31	John Carter	Associate Shadow Minister of Tourism
32	Jeff Grant	Shadow Minister of Youth Affairs
33	Warren Kyd	Associate Shadow Minister of Industry and Commerce; Associate Shadow Minister of Pacific Island Affairs
34	Ian McLean	Associate Shadow Minister of State Owned Enterprises
35	Hon Venn Young	Shadow Minister for Senior Citizens
36	Hon Merv Wellington	Shadow Minister of Statistics
37	Hon George Gair	Shadow Minister of ACC
38	Derek Angus	no portfolio
