= Fourth National Government of New Zealand =

New Zealand government led by Jim Bolger and Jenny Shipley respectively from 1990 to 1999

Fourth National Government
- Ministries of New Zealand
- 1990–1999
- Date formed: 2 November 1990
- Date dissolved: 27 November 1999

People and organisations
- Monarch: Elizabeth II
- Governor-General: Dame Catherine Tizard (1990–1996); Sir Michael Hardie-Boys (1996–1999)
- Prime Minister: Jim Bolger (1990–1997); Jenny Shipley (1997–1999)
- Deputy Prime Minister: Don McKinnon (1990–1996); Winston Peters (1996–1998); Wyatt Creech (1998–1999)
- Member parties: National Party (1990–99); New Zealand First (1996–98); Mauri Pacific (1998–99); Te Tawharau (1998–99); Mana Wahine Te Ira Tangata (1998–99); ACT New Zealand (1998–1999); United New Zealand (1998–1999)
- Status in legislature: Majority (1990–1996); Majority (coalition) (1996–1998); Minority (1998–1999) with confidence and supply from Mauri Pacific, Te Tawharau, Mana Wahine, United New Zealand, ACT and Independent
- Opposition party: Labour Party (1990–1999); NewLabour (1990–1993); New Zealand First (1993–1996,1998–1999); Alliance (1993–1999); ACT New Zealand (1996–1998); United New Zealand (1996–1998)
- Opposition leader: Mike Moore (1990–1993); Helen Clark (1993–1999)

History
- Elections: 1990 general election; 1993 general election; 1996 general election
- Outgoing election: 1999 general election
- Legislature terms: 43rd Parliament; 44th Parliament; 45th Parliament
- Predecessor: Fourth Labour Government of New Zealand
- Successor: Fifth Labour Government of New Zealand

The Fourth National Government of New Zealand (also known as the Bolger–Shipley Government) was the government of New Zealand from 2 November 1990 to 27 November 1999. Following electoral reforms in the 1996 election, Jim Bolger formed a coalition with New Zealand First. Following Bolger's resignation, the government was led by Jenny Shipley, the country's first female prime minister, for the final two years.

For the first six years, the National Party governed alone under the leadership of Jim Bolger. Extreme dissatisfaction with both National and Labour led to the reform of the electoral system: the introduction of proportional representation in the form of mixed-member proportional (MMP) representation. The first MMP election was held in 1996, and resulted in a coalition between National and New Zealand First in which Bolger continued as prime minister. Bolger was ousted in 1997 and replaced as National leader and prime minister by Jenny Shipley. The National/New Zealand First coalition dissolved in 1998, and the consequent cobbling together of another coalition between National and the deserters of various parties contributed to the government's defeat in 1999.

Following in the footsteps of the previous Labour government, the fourth National government embarked on an extensive programme of spending cuts. This programme, popularly known as "Ruthanasia" after Finance Minister Ruth Richardson, involved the reduction of social welfare benefits and the introduction of fees for healthcare and tertiary education. This was highly controversial, as was the retention of the superannuation surtax, a tax on old age pensions which National had promised to abolish. Also controversial, but in a different way, was the beginning of the Treaty settlement process.

== Significant policies ==
=== Economic ===
- 'Economic Reform'

On taking power, National discovered that the Bank of New Zealand needed large and immediate government aid, and that outgoing Finance Minister David Caygill's predictions of a small surplus were very wrong. These problems gave Finance Minister Ruth Richardson the opportunity and caucus support for major cost-cutting.

Richardson's first budget, delivered in 1991 and named by the media as 'the mother of all budgets', introduced major cuts in social welfare spending. Unemployment and other benefits were substantially cut, and 'market rents' were introduced for state houses, in some cases tripling the rents of low-income people. In combination with the high unemployment resulting from some of the 1980s reforms, this caused poverty to increase, and foodbanks and soup kitchens appeared in New Zealand for the first time since the Great Depression of the 1930s.

The government also felt that market forces should be introduced into the running of hospitals, schools and universities. User charges were introduced in universities and hospitals for the first time, and educational institutes were instructed to compete with each other for students. Although not a policy as such, the government's retention of the superannuation surtax (a tax on pensions), despite promising to abolish it, was also significant. The attempt to introduce overnight fees of $50 for public hospitals was rescinded before the 1993 election.

In some areas, governmental standards were relaxed in the expectation that market forces would assure quality via competition, such as in the Building Act 1991, which was seen as one of the steps leading to the leaky homes crisis in the following decade.

The government's economic programme became known as 'Ruthanasia' was massively unpopular, especially following the equally dramatic reforms of the 1980s. As a result, the government came extremely close to losing the 1993 election. Subsequently, Richardson was replaced as Finance Minister by Bill Birch and left politics. National's period of major economic reform was over.

- Health reforms and hospital closures

One of the most ambitious and controversial aspects of the Fourth National Government's programme was the comprehensive overhaul of the public health system. The system of democratically elected Area Health Boards was abolished and replaced with Crown Health Enterprises (CHEs), run according to the prevailing new public management ethos that created an internal market for the provision of hospital services and required the CHEs to make a profit. The degree of corporatisation of hospital services was scaled back after the 1996 election. Thirty-eight public hospitals were closed down during the term of the Fourth National Government.

- Sale of state-owned enterprises

The government continued the previous Labour government's controversial sale of State-owned enterprises. Following the near collapse of the Bank of New Zealand in 1990, the Bank was sold in 1992 to National Australia Bank Group. In 1993 the government sold New Zealand Rail Limited to a consortium led by Fay, Richwhite and Company for $400 million. In 1996 the government split the New Zealand Ministry of Works between consulting (Opus International Group) and construction (Works Infrastructure) arms, selling both branches. The same year the commercial arm of Radio New Zealand was sold to Clear Channel forming The Radio Network. In 1997 electricity generator Contact Energy, formerly a part of the Electricity Corporation of New Zealand was floated on the New Zealand Stock Exchange. In 1998 the government sold its 51.6% share in Auckland International Airport by way of a public float. At that time, the Company had some 67,000 shareholders, mainly New Zealanders holding small parcels of shares.

The government also corporatised a number of government departments, or restructured state-owned enterprises with the intention of privatising them at a later date. For example, in 1998 the Electricity Corporation of New Zealand was divided into a further three generators, Meridian Energy, Mighty River Power and Genesis Power. In 1999 the Accident Compensation Corporation was exposed to competition, albeit only for one year. Plans to corporatise Transit New Zealand never came to fruition however.

- The Employment Contracts Act

This was a major overhaul of employment law, which abolished collective bargaining and seriously weakened the power of unions.

=== Constitutional ===
- Referendum

The government passed the Citizens Initiated Referenda Act 1993. This Act allowed for non-binding referendums to be held on the petition of citizens.

- Electoral reform

By 1990, many New Zealanders were already seriously dissatisfied with their First Past the Post (FPP) electoral system, which had twice (in 1978 and 1981) led to a party losing the popular vote but winning the election. National's continuation of Labour's reforms despite a clear indication that the electorate was sick of reform intensified this feeling. National had promised a referendum on the electoral system, and having angered voters in so many other ways, felt that it would be unwise to break this promise. In the non-binding 1992 referendum an overwhelming majority of those who voted opted to replace FPP with a form of proportional representation, mixed-member proportional (MMP) representation. A binding referendum was held the following year in which a small majority voted for MMP. The first MMP election occurred in 1996; the Bolger government was returned, albeit in coalition with New Zealand First.

=== Treaty of Waitangi ===
In 1985 the Labour government had enabled the Waitangi Tribunal to investigate breaches of the Treaty of Waitangi dating back to 1840. By the early 1990s the Tribunal had made some major reports, including those into the Waikato-Tainui and Ngāi Tahu claims. An Office of Treaty Settlements was established and substantial resources and sums of money were given to various iwi in compensation for past wrongs. An attempt was made in 1995 to bring the process to an end with a billion dollar 'fiscal envelope' which was to have settled all outstanding grievances in one go. However this was rejected by Māori.

=== Foreign Affairs ===
- A 32-strong army medical team was deployed to assist in the Gulf War. These troops were integrated into the U.S. Navy 6th Hospitable Fleet.

=== Defence ===
- In 1992, New Zealand sent nine military observers to join the United Nations peacekeeping force in Bosnia. This was soon reinforced in 1994, by a 250 strong infantry company, supported by 25 M113 armoured personnel carriers, 10 unimog trucks and 21 land rovers. This was New Zealand's largest deployment of military personnel since the Vietnam War. In early January 1996, 200 New Zealand military personnel returned to New Zealand, while the remaining 50 were left to reconstitute equipment before returning to New Zealand in late January. Ultimately, New Zealand would remain involved in Bosnia through a small force of observers until mid-2007.

=== Social policy ===
- Human Rights Act

In 1993, the Human Rights Act was passed, outlawing discrimination on the grounds of sexuality. The government was excluded from the provisions of the Act, probably due to concern over the possibility of gay marriage. Several National MPs, most prominently Police Minister John Banks, opposed the Act on religious grounds.

- Work and Income

Following National's coalition with New Zealand First in 1996, the Department of Social Welfare and the New Zealand Employment Service were merged to form Work and Income New Zealand (WINZ). Alongside these reforms was the introduction of a work for the dole scheme, known as the community wage.

=== Environment ===
- Resource management

The Resource Management Act 1991 (RMA) completely overhauled New Zealand's system of planning. Originally drafted by former Labour Prime Minister and Environment Minister Sir Geoffrey Palmer and continued by Simon Upton after Labour's electoral defeat, the RMA replaced many laws regarding the environment, zoning, land and water use and many other issues and provided one piece of legislation requiring developers (including state agencies) to have regard for environmental impacts and Māori and heritage values. Critics have since argued that the RMA gives too much power to opponents of development, who can slow down or halt projects even if they have no valid objections. Others have seen the RMA as a welcome means to prevent the destruction of sacred sites, heritage buildings and fragile ecosystems.

- Climate change

In September 1993, the Fourth National Government ratified the United Nations Framework Convention on Climate Change (the UNFCCC). In July 1994, four months after the UNFCCC came into force, the Fourth National Government announced a number of specific climate change policies.

- a target of reducing net emissions to 1990 volumes by the year 2000;
- a target of slowing growth of gross emissions by 20%;
- increased carbon storage in plantation forests;
- energy sector reforms;
- an energy efficiency strategy and the Energy Efficiency and Conservation Authority (EECA)l
- renewable energy sources;
- use of the Resource Management Act 1991; and
- voluntary agreements with industry.

The Fourth National Government said that if emissions were not stabilised at 1990 levels by the year 2000, a low-level carbon charge would be introduced in December 1997.

By 1996, the National Government had established a new target for the reduction of greenhouse gases. This was to have either no increase in 2000 net emissions of carbon dioxide from 1990 volumes or a 20% reduction if it was cost-effective and had no impact on trade.

On 22 May 1998, the National Government signed the Kyoto Protocol to the UNFCCC. As an Annex B party, the National Government agreed to commit to a target of limiting greenhouse gas emissions for the five-year 2008–2012 commitment period (CP1) to five times the 1990 volume. New Zealand may have met this target by either reducing emissions or by obtaining carbon credits from the international market or from domestic carbon sinks.

== Formation ==
Jim Bolger, leader of the National Party since 1986, led the party to a landslide victory in the 1990 general election, winning nearly half the popular vote and more than two-thirds of the seats in parliament—the biggest majority government in New Zealand history. However, the result can be seen more as a rejection of the fourth Labour government than an endorsement of National. The Labour government had enacted sweeping economic and social reforms but the extent of these had split the party, causing serious public conflict between senior government members, and two leadership changes in a year and a half. This combined with a widespread feeling that the reforms had gone far enough to ensure a change of government. Having rejected reformist Labour, and having been led to believe that National would not follow in its footsteps, many voters were extremely angry when the new government went on to make further reforms along the same lines.

== 1993 election ==
Amid growing voter dissatisfaction with both major parties and the first past the post electoral system, the 1993 election was held alongside a referendum on New Zealand's electoral system. The election saw National return to power with a one-seat majority, winning 50 seats, but only 35% of the popular vote, while Labour won 34.7% of the popular vote and 45 seats. Alliance and New Zealand First, led by former Labour and National MPs respectively, gained 18.2% and 8.4% of the popular vote, but only two seats each. As a consequence of the referendum, New Zealand adopted the Mixed Member Proportional electoral system which would come into effect at the following election.

=== Second term government arrangements ===
Governmental arrangements during the 44th Parliament
Period	Government (coalition)		Confidence and supply		
1993–1994	National				
1994	National	Right of Centre			
1994–1995	National	Right of Centre	Future New Zealand		
1995	National	Right of Centre	United NZ	Christian Democrat	
1995–1996	National	United NZ	Christian Democrat	Conservative	Independent

National's slim majority and the large number of defections from both major parties saw five different governing arrangements between 1993 and 1996. After convincing former Labour minister Peter Tapsell to take the non-voting Speaker's position, National was able to govern alone until Ross Meurant left to form a new Right of Centre party (later the New Zealand Conservative Party). Right of Centre entered a coalition with National on 11 September 1994. On 8 June 1995, National MP Trevor Rogers joined the Conservatives. The coalition was briefly supported by Peter Dunne, who had left Labour to form the Future New Zealand party.

On 9 May 1995, Graeme Lee left National to form the Christian Democrat Party, but his confidence and supply kept the coalition in power as a 49-seat minority government. The coalition's seats were further reduced to 45 when a group of MPs, including Peter Dunne and defectors from Labour and National, formed the United Party on 28 June 1995. However, United's support kept the coalition in power.

The coalition collapsed in September 1995 when Ross Meurant was sacked by Jim Bolger for accepting a directorship of Prok bank, a Russian-owned bank in Vanuatu. Right of Centre continued to support National, who governed alone on 43 seats. National sought a coalition with United, which resulted in Peter Dunne becoming Minister of Revenue and Minister of Internal Affairs on 28 February 1996. With the additional support of Graeme Lee, this new coalition governed with a one-seat majority. However, the majority was lost when Peter McCardle and Michael Laws defected from National to New Zealand First in April 1996. Laws later resigned from parliament due to the Antoinette Beck affair. To avoid the need for a by-election in Laws' Hawkes Bay electorate, Jim Bolger called for a general election slightly earlier than expected.

== 1996 election ==
This was New Zealand's first election under the Mixed Member Proportional (MMP) electoral system. Though National won the most seats, they lacked a majority. Potential coalitions with United and ACT lacked the numbers needed to form a government. Other natural partners, such as the Christian Coalition and the Conservative Party, failed to win any seats. This made New Zealand First, with 17 seats, the 'kingmaker'. The election was held on 12 October 1996 however the government was not formed until 10 December.

New Zealand First was founded by Winston Peters, a former National cabinet minister who had been dismissed by Jim Bolger in 1991 after criticising party policy. Prior to the election, he created the impression that he would not join a National-led government, but after months of negotiations with both National and Labour, Peters announced his party would enter into coalition with National. This angered many New Zealand First supporters, who believed they were voting for New Zealand First to help get rid of National. Peters justified his decision on the basis of National winning the most votes, but it is suggested that National was willing to grant more policy concessions than Labour. Peters' terms were stiff; he became deputy prime minister and was also made Treasurer, a newly created position superior to but co-existing with that of Finance Minister. Various other New Zealand First MPs were given Ministerial or Associate Ministerial positions. Ultimately the new government resulted in New Zealand First being given five Cabinet positions, with some outside Cabinet as well. Leader of the opposition Helen Clark spoke after announcement of the coalition which had been reached stating, "I think it is a disappointment to every New Zealander who voted for a government of change on October 12. I think many will see it as a betrayal and most will find it very difficult to understand."

=== National–New Zealand First coalition ===
Bolger and Peters appeared to have put their previous differences aside, and initially worked very well together. However, strains began appearing in the coalition by 1997. Several New Zealand First MPs had gone into politics specifically to combat some of National's early 1990s policies, and were unhappy at being made to perpetuate them. Neil Kirton, Associate Minister of Health, was particularly unhappy, and was fired from his position in 1997. He then led a campaign within New Zealand First to cancel the coalition and seek an arrangement with Labour.

One of National's senior ministers, Transport Minister Jenny Shipley, felt chagrin at Bolger's cautious pace, and felt New Zealand First had too much power. In the middle of 1997, she started gathering support for a caucus room coup against Bolger.

Shipley struck later that year, while Bolger attended the Commonwealth Heads of Government Meeting. She convinced a majority of her National Party colleagues to back her bid for the leadership. When Bolger returned to New Zealand, he discovered that Shipley was not only planning to challenge his leadership, but had lined up enough support in the party room to defeat him. Facing an untenable situation, he resigned, and Shipley was unanimously elected to replace him.

By 1998, Peters had become aware that the coalition had cost New Zealand First so much support that it might not be returned to parliament in the following year's election. In August 1998, Shipley sacked Peters after a dispute over the privatisation of Wellington International Airport. Peters tore up the coalition agreement soon afterwards. However several New Zealand First MPs, including deputy leader Tau Henare and most of the ministers, opted to leave the party and continue to support National. They, mostly now in a new party called Mauri Pacific under Henare's leadership joined with renegade Alliance MP, Alamein Kopu in a new coalition which allowed National to retain power until the 1999 election.

== Defeat ==
By 1999, National was holding onto power with the support of former New Zealand First and Alliance MPs. By contrast, Labour had established a friendly working relationship with the Alliance. Labour leader Helen Clark had improved her public image, while Shipley had difficulty connecting with the public. A series of minor scandals concerning National's management of various state organisations helped Labour win nearly 39% of the party vote and 49 seats, compared to National's 30.5% (39 seats). Potential National allies ACT and United won only nine seats and one seat, respectively. New Zealand First was severely punished at the polls, falling to only five seats. It would have been ejected from parliament altogether had Peters not barely held onto Tauranga.

== Election results ==
Mixed-member proportional (MMP) representation was introduced in the 1996 election, thus making comparisons between the first two and second two elections difficult.

Election	Parliament	Seats	Total votes*	Percentage	Gain (loss)	Seats won*	Change	Majority
1990	43rd	97		47.82%	+3.82%	67	+27	37
1993	44th	99		35.05%	-12.77%	50	-17	1
1996	45th	120		Nat 33.87%, NZF 13.35%	Nat −1.18%	Nat 44, NZF 17	Nat −6	1
1999	46th	120		Nat 30.5%, NZF 4.26%**	Nat −3.3%, NZF −9.09%	Nat 39, NZF 5	Nat −5, NZF −12	-

* For 1996 and 1999 'votes' means party votes only. 'Seats' means both list and electorate seats.
** New Zealand First were not part of the government at the 1999 election, although several former New Zealand First MPs had formed a new coalition with National.

== Prime ministers ==
Jim Bolger was Prime Minister for the first two and a half terms of this government. Late in 1997, Jenny Shipley challenged Bolger for the leadership of the National Party. Seeing that he no longer had the support of his party, Bolger resigned and Shipley became New Zealand's first female prime minister.

Prime Ministers of the Fourth National Government

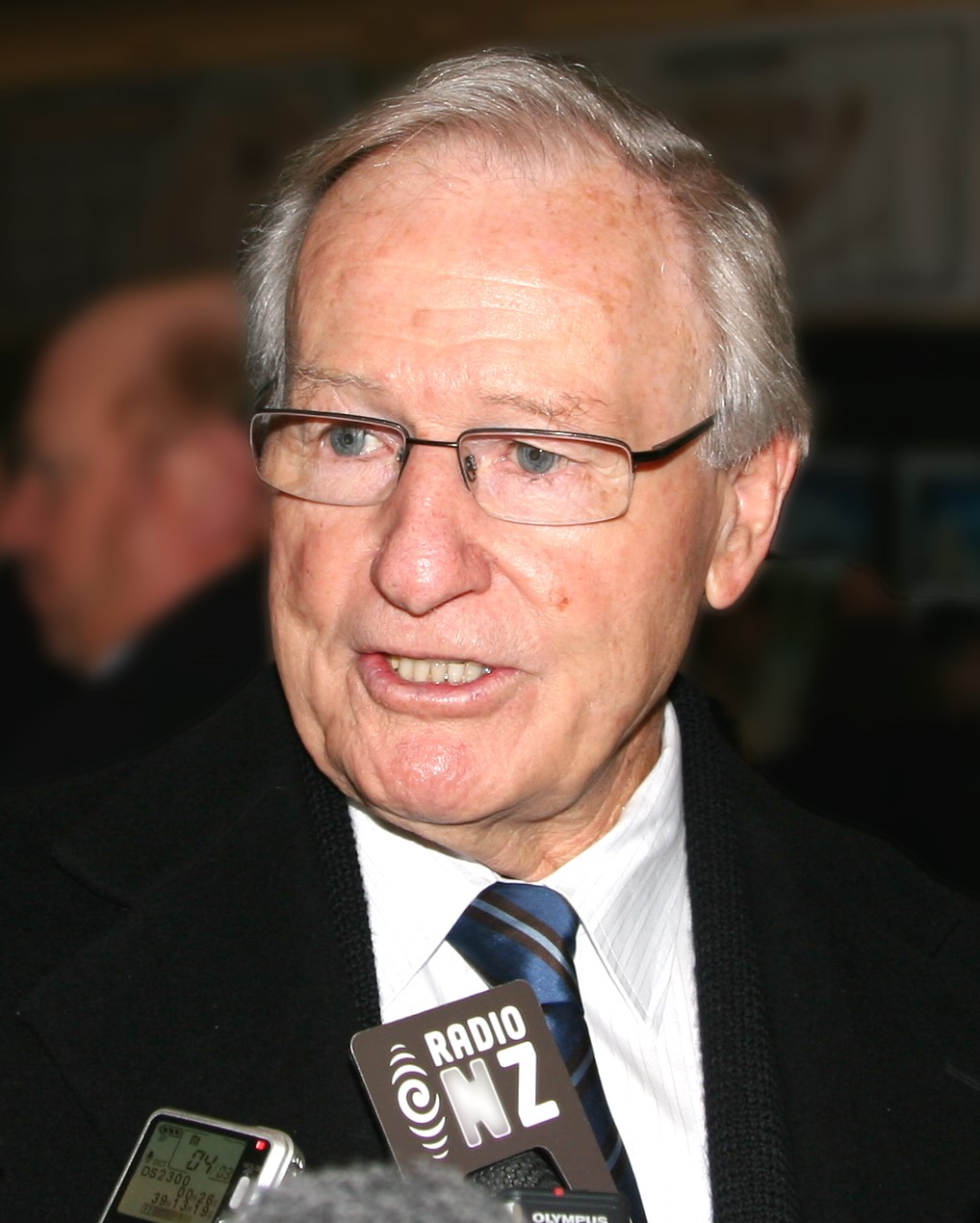
Jim Bolger
served 1990–97

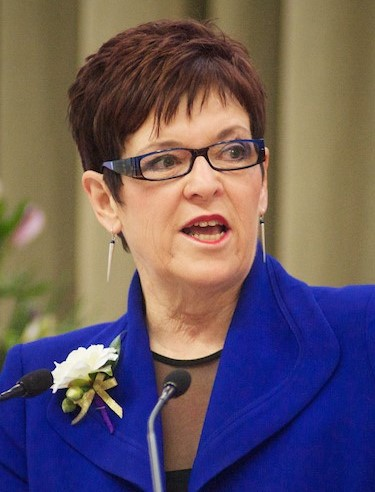
Dame Jenny Shipley
served 1997–99

== Cabinet Ministers ==
Portfolio	Minister	Party	Start	End
Prime Minister	Jim Bolger	National	2 November 1990	8 December 1997
Prime Minister	Jenny Shipley	National	8 December 1997	10 December 1999
Deputy Prime Minister	Don McKinnon	National	2 November 1990	16 December 1996
Deputy Prime Minister	Winston Peters	NZ First	16 December 1996	14 August 1998
Deputy Prime Minister	Wyatt Creech	National	14 August 1998	5 December 1999
Minister of Agriculture	John Falloon	National	2 November 1990	29 February 1996
Minister of Agriculture	Lockwood Smith	National	29 February 1996	26 August 1998
Minister of Agriculture	John Luxton	National	26 August 1998	10 December 1999
Attorney-General	Paul East	National	2 November 1990	5 December 1997
Attorney-General	Doug Graham	National	5 December 1997	10 December 1999
Minister of Broadcasting	Maurice Williamson	National	2 November 1990	10 December 1999
Minister for Civil Defence	Graeme Lee	National	2 November 1990	29 November 1993
Minister for Civil Defence	Warren Cooper	National	29 November 1993	1 March 1996
Minister for Civil Defence	John Banks	National	1 March 1996	1 November 1996
Minister for Civil Defence	Murray McCully	National	1 November 1996	16 December 1996
Minister for Civil Defence	Jack Elder	NZ First	16 December 1996	10 December 1999
Minister of Commerce	Philip Burdon	National	2 November 1990	1 March 1996
Minister of Commerce	John Luxton	National	1 March 1996	31 August 1998
Minister of Commerce	Max Bradford	National	31 August 1998	10 December 1999
Minister of Conservation	Denis Marshall	National	2 November 1990	30 May 1996
Minister of Conservation	Simon Upton	National	30 May 1996	16 December 1996
Minister of Conservation	Nick Smith	National	16 December 1996	10 December 1999
Minister for Culture and Heritage	Doug Graham	National	2 November 1990	16 December 1996
Minister for Culture and Heritage	Christine Fletcher	National	16 December 1996	12 September 1997
Minister for Culture and Heritage	Simon Upton	National	12 September 1997	31 August 1998
Minister for Culture and Heritage	Marie Hasler	National	31 August 1998	10 December 1999
Minister of Customs	Wyatt Creech	National	2 November 1990	1 July 1993
Minister of Customs	Murray McCully	National	1 July 1993	16 December 1996
Minister of Customs	Neil Kirton	NZ First	16 December 1996	12 September 1997
Minister of Customs	Tuariki Delamere	NZ First	12 September 1997	31 August 1998
Minister of Customs	John Luxton	National	31 August 1998	10 December 1999
Minister of Defence	Warren Cooper	National	26 August 1998	1 March 1996
Minister of Defence	Paul East	National	1 March 1996	5 December 1997
Minister of Defence	Max Bradford	National	5 December 1997	10 December 1999
Minister of Education	Lockwood Smith	National	2 November 1990	1 March 1996
Minister of Education	Wyatt Creech	National	1 March 1996	31 January 1999
Minister of Education	Nick Smith	National	31 January 1999	10 December 1999
Minister of Energy	John Luxton	National	2 November 1990	2 March 1994
Minister of Energy	Doug Kidd	National	2 March 1994	16 December 1996
Minister of Energy	Max Bradford	National	16 December 1996	10 December 1999
Minister for the Environment	Simon Upton	National	2 November 1990	10 December 1999
Minister of Finance	Ruth Richardson	National	2 November 1990	29 November 1993
Minister of Finance	Bill Birch	National	29 November 1993	1 February 1999
Minister of Finance	Bill English	National	1 February 1999	22 June 1999
Minister of Finance	Bill Birch	National	22 June 1999	10 December 1999
Minister of Fisheries	Doug Kidd	National	2 November 1990	16 December 1996
Minister of Fisheries	John Luxton	National	16 December 1996	10 December 1999
Minister of Foreign Affairs	Don McKinnon	National	2 November 1990	10 December 1999
Minister of Forestry	John Falloon	National	2 November 1990	16 December 1996
Minister of Forestry	Lockwood Smith	National	16 December 1996	31 August 1998
Minister of Forestry	John Luxton	National	31 August 1998	10 December 1999
Minister of Health	Simon Upton	National	2 November 1990	27 March 1993
Minister of Health	Bill Birch	National	27 March 1993	29 November 1993
Minister of Health	Jenny Shipley	National	29 November 1993	16 December 1996
Minister of Health	Bill English	National	16 December 1996	2 February 1999
Minister of Health	Wyatt Creech	National	2 February 1999	10 December 1999
Minister of Housing	John Luxton	National	2 November 1990	29 November 1993
Minister of Housing	Murray McCully	National	29 November 1993	10 December 1999
Minister of Immigration	Bill Birch	National	2 November 1990	27 March 1993
Minister of Immigration	Maurice McTigue	National	27 March 1993	29 November 1993
Minister of Immigration	Roger Maxwell	National	29 November 1993	16 December 1996
Minister of Immigration	Tuariki Delamere	NZ First	16 December 1996	10 December 1999
Minister of Internal Affairs	Graeme Lee	National	2 November 1990	28 November 1993
Minister of Internal Affairs	Warren Cooper	National	28 November 1993	29 February 1996
Minister of Internal Affairs	Peter Dunne	United	29 February 1996	16 December 1996
Minister of Internal Affairs	Jack Elder	NZ First	16 December 1996	10 December 1999
Minister of Justice	Doug Graham	National	2 November 1990	10 December 1999
Minister of Labour	Bill Birch	National	2 November 1990	3 October 1991
Minister of Labour	Christine Fletcher	National	27 March 1993	21 December 1993
Minister of Labour	Doug Kidd	National	21 December 1993	16 December 1996
Minister of Labour	Max Bradford	National	16 December 1996	10 December 1999
Leader of the House	Paul East	National	2 November 1990	27 March 1993
Leader of the House	Don McKinnon	National	27 March 1993	16 December 1996
Leader of the House	Wyatt Creech	National	16 December 1996	31 August 1998
Leader of the House	Roger Sowry	National	31 August 1998	10 December 1999
Minister of Māori Affairs	Winston Peters	National	2 November 1990	2 October 1991
Minister of Māori Affairs	Doug Kidd	National	2 October 1991	6 November 1993
Minister of Māori Affairs	John Luxton	National	6 November 1993	12 October 1996
Minister of Māori Affairs	Tau Henare	NZ First	12 October 1996	10 December 1999
Minister of Police	John Banks	National	2 November 1990	2 March 1994
Minister of Police	John Luxton	National	2 March 1994	16 December 1996
Minister of Police	Jack Elder	NZ First	16 December 1996	31 August 1998
Minister of Police	Clem Simich	National	31 August 1998	10 December 1999
Minister of Railways	Doug Kidd	National	2 November 1990	3 October 1991
Minister of Railways	Maurice McTigue	National	3 October 1991	1 July 1993
Minister of Railways	Wyatt Creech	National	1 July 1993	21 December 1993
Minister of Railways	Philip Burdon	National	21 December 1993	2 March 1994
Minister of Revenue	Wyatt Creech	National	2 November 1990	1 March 1996
Minister of Revenue	Peter Dunne	United	1 March 1996	16 December 1996
Minister of Revenue	Bill Birch	National	16 December 1996	31 August 1998
Minister of Revenue	Max Bradford	National	31 August 1998	1 February 1999
Minister of Revenue	Bill English	National	1 February 1996	22 June 1999
Minister of Revenue	Bill Birch	National	22 June 1999	10 December 1999
Minister for Social Welfare	Jenny Shipley	National	2 November 1990	12 October 1996
Minister for Social Welfare	Roger Sowry	National	12 October 1996	10 December 1999
Minister for Sport and Recreation	John Banks	National	2 November 1990	16 December 1996
Minister for Sport and Recreation	Murray McCully	National	16 December 1996	10 December 1999
Minister for State Owned Enterprises	Doug Kidd	National	2 November 1990	3 October 1991
Minister for State Owned Enterprises	Maurice McTigue	National	3 October 1991	27 March 1993
Minister for State Owned Enterprises	Wyatt Creech	National	27 March 1993	29 November 1993
Minister for State Owned Enterprises	Philip Burdon	National	29 November 1993	8 November 1996
Minister for State Owned Enterprises	Jenny Shipley	National	16 December 1996	8 December 1997
Minister for State Owned Enterprises	Tony Ryall	National	8 December 1997	10 December 1999
Minister of Statistics	Rob Storey	National	2 November 1990	1 July 1993
Minister of Statistics	Maurice Williamson	National	1 July 1993	10 December 1999
Minister of Tourism	John Banks	National	2 November 1990	1 November 1996
Minister of Tourism	Murray McCully	National	1 November 1996	27 April 1999
Minister of Tourism	Lockwood Smith	National	27 April 1999	10 December 1999
Minister of Trade	Don McKinnon	National	2 November 1990	16 December 1996
Minister of Trade	Lockwood Smith	National	16 December 1996	10 December 1999
Minister of Transport	Rob Storey	National	2 November 1990	29 November 1993
Minister of Transport	Maurice Williamson	National	29 November 1993	16 December 1996
Minister of Transport	Jenny Shipley	National	16 December 1996	8 December 1997
Minister of Transport	Maurice Williamson	National	8 December 1997	10 December 1999
Treasurer	Winston Peters	NZ First	16 December 1996	14 August 1998
Treasurer	Bill Birch	National	14 August 1998	22 June 1999
Treasurer	Bill English	National	22 June 1999	10 December 1999
Minister for Treaty of Waitangi Negotiations	Doug Graham	National	2 November 1990	10 December 1999
Minister for Women	Jenny Shipley	National	2 November 1990	12 December 1996
Minister for Women	Christine Fletcher	National	12 December 1996	11 September 1997
Minister for Women	Jenny Shipley	National	11 September 1997	26 August 1998
Minister for Women	Georgina te Heuheu	National	26 August 1998	10 December 1999

== See also ==
- List of New Zealand governments
- New Zealand National Party
- Ruthanasia
- Electoral reform in New Zealand
- Electoral system of New Zealand
