= 45th New Zealand Parliament =

Term of the Parliament of New Zealand

45th Parliament of New Zealand
←	44th Parliament	46th Parliament	→
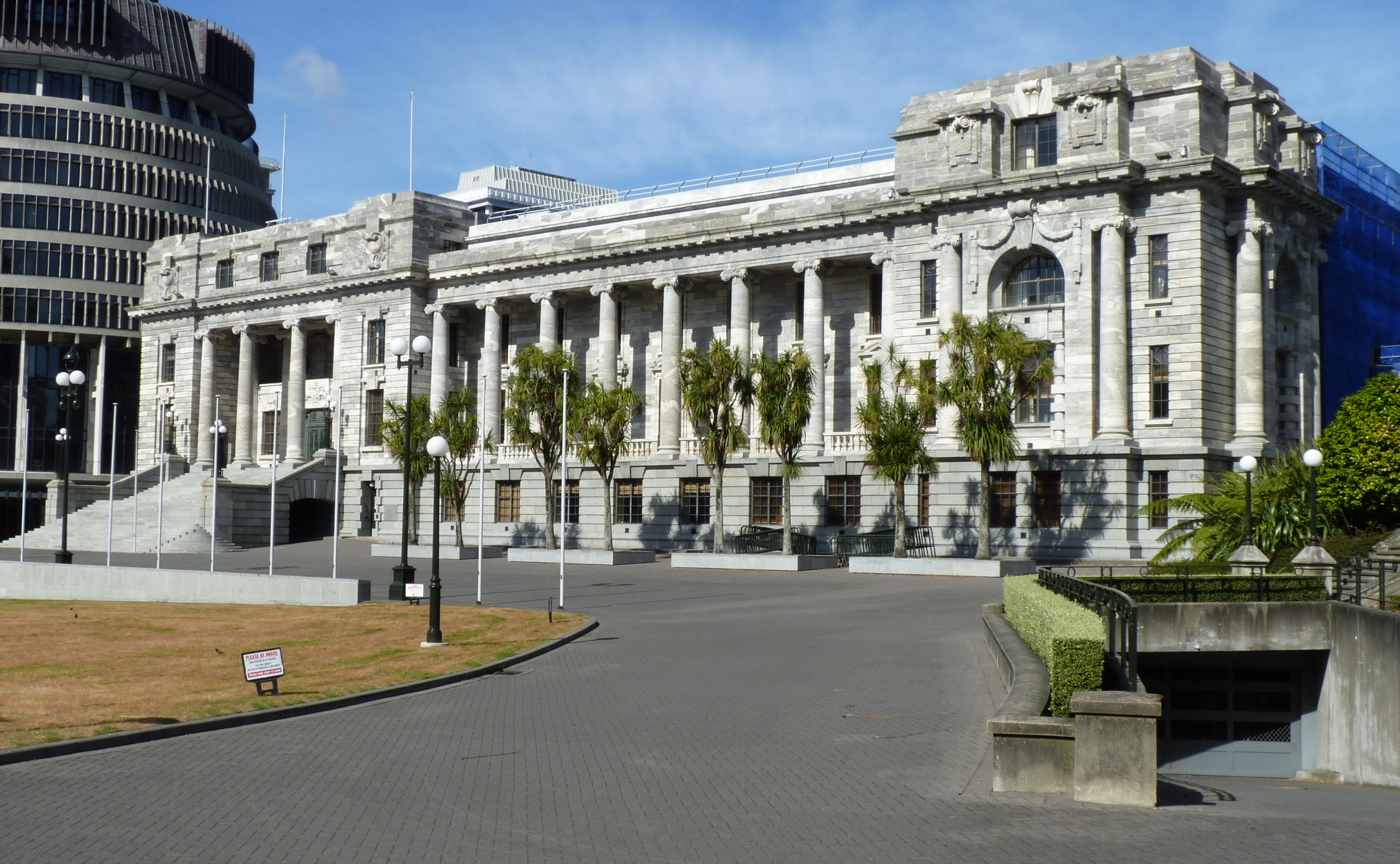
- Parliament House, Wellington

Overview
- Legislative body: New Zealand Parliament
- Term: 12 December 1996 – 5 October 1999
- Election: 1996 New Zealand general election
- Government: Fourth National Government

House of Representatives
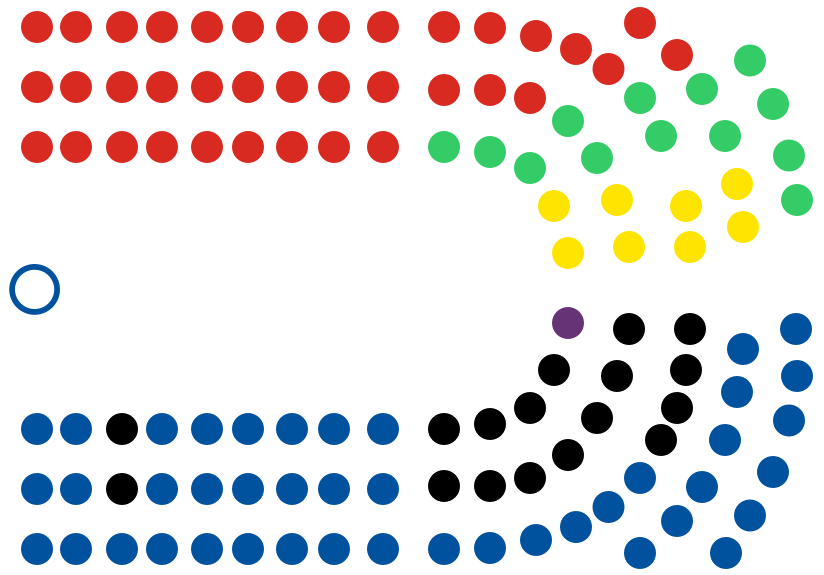
- Members: 120
- Speaker of the House: Doug Kidd
- Leader of the House: Roger Sowry — Wyatt Creech until 31 August 1998
- Prime Minister: Jenny Shipley — Jim Bolger until 8 December 1997
- Leader of the Opposition: Helen Clark

Sovereign
- Monarch: Elizabeth II
- Governor-General: Michael Hardie Boys

The 45th New Zealand Parliament was a term of the Parliament of New Zealand. Its composition was determined by the 1996 election, and it sat until the 1999 election.

The 45th Parliament was notable in that it was the first to be elected under the new MMP electoral system, a form of proportional representation. It was also notable for the fact that it was the first New Zealand Parliament to have an Asian person, Pansy Wong, elected to it. The difference between the 45th Parliament and its predecessor were considerable — the 44th Parliament had opened with only four seats being held by minor parties, but at the opening of the 45th Parliament, minor parties held thirty-nine seats. Because of the considerably altered balance of power in Parliament, neither of the two major parties could govern alone, and New Zealand First, the largest of the four other parties in Parliament, was put in the position of "kingmaker". In the end, New Zealand First opted for a coalition with the National Party which had governed in the previous Parliament, marking the first coalition government in New Zealand for over half a century. The Labour Party continued in Opposition.

The 45th Parliament consisted of one hundred and twenty representatives. Sixty-five of these representatives were chosen by geographical electorates, including five Māori electorates. The remainder were elected by means of party-list proportional representation under the MMP electoral system.

== Electoral boundaries for the 45th Parliament ==
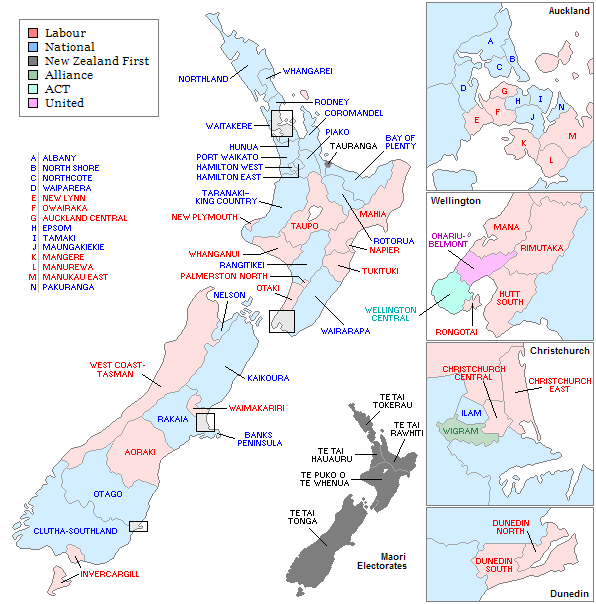

== Overview of seats ==
The table below shows the number of MPs in each party following the 1996 election and at dissolution:

Affiliation	Members	
Affiliation	At 1996 election	At dissolution
National	44	44
NZ First ^{1}	17	In opposition
Mauri Pacific ^{2}	–	5
Te Tawharau ^{2}	–	1
Mana Wahine ^{2}	–	1
Independent ^{2}	–	1
ACT ^{3}	In opposition	8
United NZ ^{3}	In opposition	1
Government total	61	61
Labour	37	37
Alliance ^{4}	13	11
NZ First	In government	9
ACT	8	With government
United NZ	1	With government
Christian Heritage	–	1
Independent	–	1
Opposition total	59	59
Total	120	120
Working Government majority	2	2

Notes

- ^1 New Zealand First initially entered into a coalition with the National Party, which broke down in 1998. Half the party resigned and became independents, while the other half remained with the party and joined the opposition.
- ^2 A collection of small parties were founded and received representation by independent MPs who were formerly with New Zealand First and Alliance. They supported the National Party in government.
- ^3 ACT and United extended support to the National Party, giving the government a slim majority in parliament.
- ^4 The Green Party sat in Parliament under the banner of the Alliance Party.
- The Working Government majority is calculated as all Government MPs less all other parties.

== Initial composition of the 45th Parliament ==
45th New Zealand Parliament – MPs elected to Parliament

List MPs are ordered by allocation as determined by the Chief Electoral Office and the party lists.

Party	Name	Electorate	Term
National	Murray McCully	Albany	Fourth
Labour	Jim Sutton	Aoraki	Fourth
Labour	Judith Tizard	Auckland Central	Third
National	David Carter	Banks Peninsula	Second
National	Tony Ryall	Bay of Plenty	Third
Labour	Tim Barnett	Christchurch Central	First
Labour	Larry Sutherland	Christchurch East	Fourth
National	Bill English	Clutha-Southland	Third
National	Murray McLean	Coromandel	First
Labour	Pete Hodgson	Dunedin North	Third
Labour	Michael Cullen	Dunedin South	Sixth
National	Christine Fletcher	Epsom	Third
National	Tony Steel	Hamilton East	Second
National	Bob Simcock	Hamilton West	First
National	Warren Kyd	Hunua	Fourth
Labour	Trevor Mallard	Hutt South	Fourth
National	Gerry Brownlee	Ilam	First
Labour	Mark Peck	Invercargill	Second
National	Doug Kidd	Kaikōura	Seventh
National	John Luxton	Karapiro	Fourth
Labour	Janet Mackey	Mahia	Second
Labour	Graham Kelly	Mana	Fourth
Labour	Taito Phillip Field	Mangere	Second
Labour	Ross Robertson	Manukau East	Fourth
Labour	George Hawkins	Manurewa	Third
National	Belinda Vernon	Maungakiekie	First
Labour	Geoff Braybrooke	Napier	Sixth
National	Nick Smith	Nelson	Third
Labour	Phil Goff	New Lynn	Fifth
Labour	Harry Duynhoven	New Plymouth	Third
National	Wayne Mapp	North Shore	First
National	Ian Revell	Northcote	Third
National	John Carter	Northland	Fourth
United NZ	Peter Dunne	Ohariu-Belmont	Fifth
National	Gavan Herlihy	Otago	First
Labour	Judy Keall	Otaki	Fourth
Labour	Helen Clark	Owairaka	Sixth
National	Maurice Williamson	Pakuranga	Fourth
Labour	Steve Maharey	Palmerston North	Third
National	Bill Birch	Port Waikato	Ninth
National	Jenny Shipley	Rakaia	Fourth
National	Denis Marshall	Rangitikei	Fifth
Labour	Paul Swain	Rimutaka	Third
National	Lockwood Smith	Rodney	Fifth
Labour	Annette King	Rongotai	Fourth
National	Max Bradford	Rotorua	Third
National	Clem Simich	Tamaki	Third
National	Jim Bolger	Taranaki-King Country	Ninth
Labour	Mark Burton	Taupo	Second
NZ First	Winston Peters	Tauranga	Sixth
Labour	Rick Barker	Tukituki	Second
Labour	Mike Moore	Waimakariri	Eighth
National	Brian Neeson	Waipareira	Third
National	Wyatt Creech	Wairarapa	Fourth
National	Marie Hasler	Waitakere	Second
ACT	Richard Prebble	Wellington Central	Seventh
Labour	Damien O'Connor	West Coast-Tasman	Second
Labour	Jill Pettis	Whanganui	Second
National	John Banks	Whangarei	Sixth
Alliance	Jim Anderton	Wigram	Fifth
NZ First	Rana Waitai	Te Puku O Te Whenua	First
NZ First	Tuku Morgan	Te Tai Hauāuru	First
NZ First	Tuariki Delamere	Te Tai Rawhiti	First
NZ First	Tau Henare	Te Tai Tokerau	Second
NZ First	Tu Wyllie	Te Tai Tonga	First
Alliance	Sandra Lee	Party list, rank 02	Second
ACT	Derek Quigley	Party list, rank 02	Fourth
Alliance	Jeanette Fitzsimons	Party list, rank 03	First
Alliance	John Wright	Party list, rank 04	First
ACT	Ken Shirley	Party list, rank 03	Third
Alliance	Frank Grover	Party list, rank 05	First
NZ First	Ann Batten	Party list, rank 03	First
Alliance	Pam Corkery	Party list, rank 06	First
NZ First	Peter McCardle	Party list, rank 04	Third
ACT	Donna Awatere Huata	Party list, rank 04	First
NZ First	Jenny Bloxham	Party list, rank 05	First
Alliance	Matt Robson	Party list, rank 07	First
NZ First	Brian Donnelly	Party list, rank 06	First
ACT	Patricia Schnauer	Party list, rank 05	First
Alliance	Laila Harré	Party list, rank 08	First
NZ First	Jack Elder	Party list, rank 07	Fifth
Alliance	Phillida Bunkle	Party list, rank 08	First
NZ First	Doug Woolerton	Party list, rank 08	First
National	Don McKinnon	Party list, rank 02	Seventh
ACT	Owen Jennings	Party list, rank 06	First
National	Paul East	Party list, rank 05	Seventh
NZ First	Deborah Morris	Party list, rank 09	First
Labour	Dover Samuels	Party list, rank 03	First
Alliance	Rod Donald	Party list, rank 10	First
National	Doug Graham	Party list, rank 06	Fifth
Labour	Lianne Dalziel	Party list, rank 04	Third
National	Georgina te Heuheu	Party list, rank 07	First
Labour	Mark Gosche	Party list, rank 05	First
NZ First	Ron Mark	Party list, rank 11	First
National	Katherine O'Regan	Party list, rank 10	Fifth
Alliance	Grant Gillon	Party list, rank 11	First
Labour	Jonathan Hunt	Party list, rank 07	Eleventh
National	Simon Upton	Party list, rank 11	Sixth
ACT	Rodney Hide	Party list, rank 07	First
National	Joy McLauchlan	Party list, rank 13	Third
Labour	Nanaia Mahuta	Party list, rank 08	First
NZ First	Neil Kirton	Party list, rank 13	First
National	Roger Sowry	Party list, rank 15	Third
Labour	Jill White	Party list, rank 09	Second
National	Jim Gerard	Party list, rank 17	Fifth
Alliance	Alamein Kopu	Party list, rank 12	First
Labour	Marian Hobbs	Party list, rank 12	First
NZ First	Peter Brown	Party list, rank 13	First
National	Arthur Anae	Party list, rank 19	First
Labour	Joe Hawke	Party list, rank 15	First
National	Eric Roy	Party list, rank 23	Second
Labour	Dianne Yates	Party list, rank 16	Second
National	Peter Gresham	Party list, rank 24	Third
ACT	Muriel Newman	Party list, rank 08	First
NZ First	Robyn McDonald	Party list, rank 14	First
Alliance	Liz Gordon	Party list, rank 13	First
National	Roger Maxwell	Party list, rank 25	Fifth
Labour	Ruth Dyson	Party list, rank 19	Second
National	Pansy Wong	Party list, rank 26	First
Labour	Tariana Turia	Party list, rank 20	First

== By-elections during 45th Parliament ==
There was one by-election held during the term of the 45th Parliament.

Electorate and by-election		Date	Incumbent	Cause	Winner
Taranaki-King Country	1998	2 May	Jim Bolger	Resignation; appointed ambassador to Washington	Shane Ardern

=== Summary of changes during term ===
- Jim Gerard, a National Party list MP, resigned from Parliament in April 1997 to take up a post as High Commissioner in Ottawa. He was replaced by Annabel Young, the next candidate on National's list.
- Alamein Kopu, an Alliance list MP, resigned from her party in July 1997. She eventually formed her own party, Mana Wahine Te Ira Tangata.
- Jim Bolger, having been replaced as Prime Minister by Jenny Shipley in 1997, left Parliament in 1998. This caused a by-election in his Taranaki-King Country seat, won by Shane Ardern of the National Party.
- Neil Kirton, a New Zealand First list MP, resigned from his party in July 1998 after ongoing conflict with its leadership. Kirton opposed his party's coalition with the National Party, and believed that the National Party was too dominant in the agreement. Kirton became an independent.
- After the collapse of the coalition between the National Party and New Zealand First, the junior partner, New Zealand First, splintered. Eight MPs (Jenny Bloxham, Peter Brown, Brian Donnelly, Ron Mark, Robyn McDonald, Winston Peters, Doug Woolerton, and Tu Wyllie) remained with the party, and eight MPs (Ann Batten, Tuariki Delamere, Jack Elder, Tau Henare, Peter McCardle, Tuku Morgan, Deborah Morris, and Rana Waitai) resigned and become independents. The MPs who resigned did not remain united, and eventually split four ways.
  - Batten, Elder, Henare, Morgan, and Waitai established the Mauri Pacific party.
  - Delamere joined the Te Tawharau party.
  - Morris resigned from Parliament. She was replaced by Gilbert Myles, the next candidate on her former party's list. Myles remained attached to New Zealand First.
  - McCardle remained an independent.
- Jill White, a Labour Party list MP, resigned from Parliament in 1998 to become Mayor of Palmerston North. She was replaced by Helen Duncan, the next candidate on Labour's list.
- Paul East, a National Party list MP, resigned from Parliament in 1999 to take up a post as High Commissioner in London. He was replaced by Alec Neill, the next candidate on National's list.
- Frank Grover, an Alliance list MP, resigned from his party on 11 June 1999. He joined the Christian Heritage Party.

== Seating plan ==
=== Start of term ===
The chamber is in a horseshoe-shape.

													Samuels	Turia	Robson	Bunkle
Braybrooke	Sutherland	Duynhoven	Tizard	Dyson	Field	Mackey	O'Connor	Peck	Barnett	Gosche	Hawke	Hobbs	Mahuta	Wright		Harré	Donald
Swain	Kelly	Barker	Burton	Hunt	Hodgson	Keall	Hawkins	Robertson	Pettis	White	Yates	Gillon	Grover		Corkery	Hide	Kopu
King	Goff	Cullen	Clark	Moore	Maharey	Dalziel	Sutton	Mallard	Lee	Anderton	Fitzsimons	Shirley		Quigley		Newman	Gordon
													Prebble	Awatere Huata	Jennings
Kidd															Schnauer
Kidd															Wyllie
													Dunne	Batten	Woolerton
Graham	Birch	Peters	BOLGER	McKinnon	Shipley	East	L. Smith	Upton	Henare	McCardle	Elder	Delamere		Brown	Morgan	McLean	Gerard
Bradford	Luxton	Mark	J. Carter	Creech	English	Williamson	McCully	Sowry	Donnelly	Morris	Kirton	McDonald	Waitai		Bloxham	Herlihy	Wong
Revell	Fletcher	N. Smith	D. Carter	Banks	Gresham	Marshall	O'Regan	Maxwell	Kyd	Roy	McLauchlan	Neeson	Ryall	Simich	Anae	Brownlee	Vernon
													Hasler	Steel	Mapp	Simcock	te Heuheu

== See also ==
- Shadow Cabinet of Helen Clark
