= Official Opposition (New Zealand) =

Largest political party not in power

The Official Opposition (formally His Majesty's Loyal Opposition) in New Zealand is usually the largest political party or coalition that is not a member of the ruling government—it does not provide ministers. This is usually the second-largest party in the House of Representatives, although in certain unusual circumstances it may be the largest party (due to a larger government bloc), or even a third or fourth party.

The Official Opposition forms a shadow cabinet headed by the leader of the Opposition and comprising senior MPs with the same portfolio interests as the government's ministers. Unlike in the United Kingdom, where members of the shadow cabinet are called "shadow ministers," the members of New Zealand's shadow cabinet are called "opposition spokespeople."

== Overview ==
The Opposition aims to hold the government accountable and to present itself to the national electorate as a credible government in waiting. For example, during Question Time, Opposition spokespersons will ask questions of ministers with the aim of highlighting a weakness or embarrassing the government. Oppositions also engage in parliamentary gestures such as refusal to grant confidence or voting down the budget.

With the introduction of MMP in 1996 (after referendums in 1992 and 1993), there was consideration to remove the official role of the Opposition; with several parties outside the government, it was no longer clear which party, if any, was the Official Opposition. This is complicated more by parties that occasionally act with the government and at other times vote against it. The unusual positioning that developed after the 2005 election – in which minor parties supported the government and received ministers but remained outside the Cabinet – further complicated the concept of 'opposition'. However, the continued dominance of the political scene by the National and Labour parties means that the Official Opposition has been retained, and inevitably the Official Opposition is whichever of the National and Labour parties is not leading a government at the time. Parties and members of parliament outside the government that do not work with the Official Opposition party are said to "sit on the cross-benches".

Grand coalitions have been formed only twice in New Zealand, on both occasions with the aim of forming a national response to a crisis. The first was the War Cabinet of 1915–1919, involving the Reform and Liberal Parties, under the leadership of Reform Prime Minister William Massey. The second was the Coalition Government of 1931–1935 to combat the Great Depression, between the United Party (successor to the Liberal Party) and the Reform Party, and led by United leader George Forbes. In both cases, Labour formed the official Opposition against these governments. Before the Labour Party was formed in July 1916 there was a combined caucus of two parties (the United Labour Party and Social Democratic Party) as well as several labour-aligned independents. The Labour caucus decided to maintain its independence by not joining the national ministry and its leader, Alfred Hindmarsh, declined a seat in the cabinet.

The Labour Party currently form the Official Opposition.

== Shadow cabinet ==
=== List of shadow cabinets ===
Below is a list of the shadow cabinets of New Zealand from 1965 to the present.

Date	Leader of the Opposition	Shadow Cabinet	Government
1965	Norman Kirk	Kirk	Second National
1972	Jack Marshall	Marshall	Third Labour
1974	Robert Muldoon	Muldoon I	Third Labour
1975	Bill Rowling	Rowling	Third National
1983	David Lange	Lange	Third National
1984	Sir Robert Muldoon	Muldoon II	Fourth Labour
1984	Jim McLay	McLay	Fourth Labour
1986	Jim Bolger	Bolger	Fourth Labour
1990	Mike Moore	Moore	Fourth National
1993	Helen Clark	Clark	Fourth National
1999	Jenny Shipley	Shipley	Fifth Labour
2001	Bill English	English I	Fifth Labour
2003	Don Brash	Brash	Fifth Labour
2006	John Key	Key	Fifth Labour
2008	Phil Goff	Goff	Fifth National
2011	David Shearer	Shearer	Fifth National
2013	David Cunliffe	Cunliffe	Fifth National
2014	Andrew Little	Little	Fifth National
2017	Jacinda Ardern	Ardern	Fifth National
2017	Bill English	English II	Sixth Labour
2018	Simon Bridges	Bridges	Sixth Labour
2020	Todd Muller	Muller	Sixth Labour
2020	Judith Collins	Collins	Sixth Labour
2021	Christopher Luxon	Luxon	Sixth Labour
2023	Chris Hipkins	Hipkins	Sixth National
