= Shadow Cabinet of Helen Clark =

New Zealand shadow cabinet (1993–1999)

New Zealand political leader Helen Clark assembled a "shadow cabinet" system amongst the Labour caucus following her election to the position of Leader of the Opposition in 1993. She composed this of individuals who acted for the party as spokespeople in assigned roles while she was Leader of the Opposition (1993–99).

As the Labour Party formed the largest party not in government, the frontbench team was as a result the Official Opposition of the New Zealand House of Representatives.

== List of shadow ministers ==
Portfolio	Minister	Start	End
Leader	Helen Clark	1 December 1993	10 December 1999
Deputy Leader	David Caygill	1 December 1993	11 June 1996
Deputy Leader	Michael Cullen	11 June 1996	10 December 1999
Agriculture	Jim Sutton	1 December 1993	10 December 1999
Attorney-General	David Caygill	1 December 1993	20 December 1996
Attorney-General	Phil Goff	20 December 1996	8 August 1997
Attorney-General	Lianne Dalziel	8 August 1997	10 December 1999
Commerce	Peter Dunne	1 December 1993	12 October 1994
Commerce	Annette King	18 October 1994	20 December 1996
Commerce	Paul Swain	20 December 1996	10 December 1999
Customs	Peter Dunne	1 December 1993	12 October 1994
Customs	Annette King	18 October 1994	20 December 1996
Customs	Rick Barker	20 December 1996	10 December 1999
Defence	Geoff Braybrooke	1 December 1993	10 December 1999
Education	Margaret Austin	1 December 1993	29 June 1995
Education	David Caygill	29 June 1995	26 June 1996
Education	Trevor Mallard	26 June 1996	10 December 1999
Finance	Michael Cullen	1 December 1993	10 December 1999
Foreign Affairs	David Lange	1 December 1993	28 February 1995
Foreign Affairs	David Caygill	28 February 1995	29 June 1995
Foreign Affairs	Helen Clark	29 June 1995	18 September 1996
Foreign Affairs	Mike Moore	18 September 1996	31 August 1999
Foreign Affairs	Phil Goff	1 September 1999	10 December 1999
Health	Lianne Dalziel	1 December 1993	8 August 1997
Health	Annette King	8 August 1997	10 December 1999
Internal Affairs	Trevor Mallard	1 December 1993	10 December 1999
Justice	Phil Goff	1 December 1993	10 December 1999
Labour	Steve Maharey	1 December 1993	8 August 1997
Labour	Pete Hodgson	8 August 1997	10 December 1999
Maori Affairs	Koro Wētere	1 December 1993	20 December 1996
Maori Affairs	Dover Samuels	20 December 1996	10 December 1999
Overseas Trade	Jack Elder	1 December 1993	4 April 1996
Overseas Trade	Jim Sutton	4 April 1996	18 September 1996
Overseas Trade	Mike Moore	18 September 1996	31 August 1999
Overseas Trade	Jim Sutton	1 September 1999	10 December 1999
Revenue	Peter Dunne	1 December 1993	12 October 1994
Revenue	Jim Sutton	13 October 1994	20 December 1996
Revenue	Mark Peck	20 December 1996	10 December 1999
Social Welfare	Clive Matthewson	1 December 1993	29 June 1995
Social Welfare	Annette King	29 June 1995	8 August 1997
Social Welfare	Steve Maharey	8 August 1997	10 December 1999
Transport	Harry Duynhoven	1 December 1993	10 December 1999

== Frontbench teams ==
=== 1993–96 ===
The lists below contains a list of Clark's spokespeople and their respective roles during the 44th Parliament. In the lead up to MMP several party defections took place during the parliamentary term, making reshuffles commonplace.

Clark announced her first lineup on 13 December 1993. Less than a year later, in October 1994, Peter Dunne split from Labour, leading to a rearranging of portfolios. Dunne's commerce and customs portfolios were given to Annette King and the revenue portfolio transferred to Jim Sutton. His seat on the frontbench was allocated to Steve Maharey. In February 1995 there was a minor reshuffle after David Lange announced he would retire at the next election. Deputy Leader David Caygill was given foreign affairs with Richard Northey taking the disarmament and arms control portfolio. Lange retained the racing portfolio. In June 1995 two MPs, Clive Matthewson and Margaret Austin, left Labour to form a new party, United New Zealand. Caygill took the education portfolio from Austin and Annette King was given Matthewson's Social Welfare portfolio. In the same reshuffle Clark took on foreign affairs from Caygill. In June 1996 Caygill announced his retirement and the education portfolio was given to Trevor Mallard. Jack Elder defected to New Zealand First in April 1996 and his overseas trade portfolio was allocated to Jim Sutton. In September 1996 the former leader Mike Moore, who had previously declined to take any portfolio, accepted the foreign affairs and overseas trade portfolios.

==== First iteration ====
Rank	Shadow Minister	Portfolio/s
1	Rt Hon Helen Clark	Leader of the Opposition; Shadow Minister of Security Intelligence Services
2	Hon David Caygill	Deputy Leader of the Opposition; Shadow Attorney-General
3	Hon Michael Cullen	Shadow Minister of Finance; Shadow Minister of Statistics
4	Hon Koro Wētere	Shadow Minister of Maori Affairs
5	Rt Hon Jonathan Hunt	Shadow Leader of the House; Senior Whip
6	Rt Hon David Lange	Shadow Minister of Foreign Affairs; Shadow Minister of Disarmament and Arms Control; Shadow Minister of Racing
7	Hon Clive Matthewson	Shadow Minister of Social Welfare; Shadow Minister for the Audit Department
8	Hon Phil Goff	Shadow Minister of Justice
9	Hon Annette King	Shadow Minister of Immigration; Shadow Minister of Business & Industry
10	Hon Peter Dunne	Shadow Minister of Revenue; Shadow Minister of Commerce; Shadow Minister of Customs
11	Lianne Dalziel	Shadow Minister of Health; Shadow Minister for ACC
12	Hon Margaret Austin	Shadow Minister of Education; Shadow Minister of Science & Technology
13	Hon Jim Sutton	Shadow Minister of Agriculture; Shadow Minister of Forestry; Shadow Minister of Lands
14	Trevor Mallard	Shadow Minister of State Services; Shadow Minister of Internal Affairs; Shadow Minister of Civil Defence; Shadow Minister of Sport and Recreation
15	Hon Whetu Tirikatene-Sullivan	Shadow Minister of Maori Welfare; Shadow Minister of Family Affairs
16	Elizabeth Tennet	Shadow Minister of Women's Affairs; Shadow Minister of State Owned Enterprises
17	Steve Maharey	Shadow Minister of Labour; Shadow Minister of Employment
18	Pete Hodgson	Shadow Minister for the Environment; Shadow Minister of Energy
19	Jack Elder	Shadow Minister of Overseas Trade
20	Graham Kelly	Shadow Minister of Fisheries; Shadow Minister of Broadcasting
21	Larry Sutherland	Junior Whip
22	Rt Hon Mike Moore	no portfolio
23	John Blincoe	Shadow Minister of Conservation
24	Paul Swain	Shadow Minister of Housing
25	Geoff Braybrooke	Shadow Minister of Defence; Shadow Minister of Veterans Affairs
26	Richard Northey	Shadow Minister of Local Government; Shadow Minister of Youth Affairs
27	George Hawkins	Shadow Minister of Police; Shadow Minister for the Serious Fraud Office
28	Ross Robertson	Shadow Minister of Tourism; Shadow Minister of Small Business
29	Judith Tizard	Shadow Minister of Cultural Affairs
30	Judy Keall	Shadow Minister of Senior Citizens; Shadow Minister of Consumer Affairs
31	Harry Duynhoven	Shadow Minister of Transport

==== Final iteration ====
Rank	Shadow Minister	Portfolio/s
1	Rt Hon Helen Clark	Leader of the Opposition; Shadow Minister of Security Intelligence Services
2	Hon Michael Cullen	Deputy Leader of the Opposition; Shadow Minister of Finance; Shadow Minister of Statistics
3	Rt Hon Mike Moore	Shadow Minister of Foreign Affairs; Shadow Minister of Overseas Trade
4	Steve Maharey	Shadow Minister of Labour; Shadow Minister of Employment
5	Hon Koro Wētere	Shadow Minister of Maori Affairs
6	Rt Hon Jonathan Hunt	Shadow Leader of the House; Senior Whip
7	Hon Phil Goff	Shadow Minister of Justice
8	Hon Annette King	Shadow Minister of Social Welfare; Shadow Minister of Immigration; Shadow Minister of Business & Industry; Shadow Minister of Commerce; Shadow Minister of Customs
9	Hon David Caygill	Shadow Attorney-General
10	Rt Hon David Lange	Shadow Minister of Racing
11	Lianne Dalziel	Shadow Minister of Health
12	Trevor Mallard	Shadow Minister of Education; Shadow Minister of State Services; Shadow Minister of Internal Affairs; Shadow Minister of Civil Defence; Shadow Minister of Sport
13	Hon Jim Sutton	Shadow Minister of Agriculture; Shadow Minister of Forestry; Shadow Minister of Lands; Shadow Minister of Revenue
14	Hon Whetu Tirikatene-Sullivan	Shadow Minister of Social Development; Shadow Minister of Family Affairs
15	Elizabeth Tennet	Shadow Minister of Women's Affairs; Shadow Minister of State Owned Enterprises
16	Pete Hodgson	Shadow Minister for the Environment; Shadow Minister of Energy
17	Graham Kelly	Shadow Minister of Fisheries; Shadow Minister of Broadcasting
18	Larry Sutherland	Junior Whip
19	John Blincoe	Shadow Minister of Conservation
20	Paul Swain	Shadow Minister of Housing; Shadow Minister for ACC
21	Geoff Braybrooke	Shadow Minister of Defence; Shadow Minister of Veterans Affairs
22	Richard Northey	Shadow Minister of Local Government; Shadow Minister of Youth Affairs; Shadow Minister of Disarmament and Arms Control
23	George Hawkins	Shadow Minister of Police; Shadow Minister of Serious Fraud Office
24	Ross Robertson	Shadow Minister of Tourism; Shadow Minister of Small Business
25	Judith Tizard	Shadow Minister of Cultural Affairs
26	Judy Keall	Shadow Minister of Senior Citizens; Shadow Minister of Consumer Affairs
27	Harry Duynhoven	Shadow Minister of Transport
28	Chris Carter	Shadow Minister of Ethnic Affairs
29	Taito Phillip Field	Shadow Minister of Pacific Island Affairs

=== 1996–99 ===
The list below contains a list of Clark's spokespeople and their respective roles during the 45th Parliament:

Clark announced her first post-election lineup on 20 December 1996. In August 1997 there was a reshuffle surrounding the removal of Lianne Dalziel as Shadow Minister of Health. She was instead made Shadow Attorney-General and given the portfolios of immigration, youth affairs and statistics. Annette King replaced her as Shadow Minister of Health with King's social welfare and racing portfolios being transferred to Steve Maharey and Damien O'Connor respectively. Jill Pettis gained the conservation portfolio from Pete Hodgson who was given labour from Maharey. In September 1999 Jim Sutton resigned as Shadow Minister of Forestry after a policy disagreement. The portfolio was given to Pete Hodgson. After Mike Moore left Parliament to become Director-General of the World Trade Organization the foreign affairs portfolio was given to Phil Goff and overseas trade allocated to Jim Sutton.

==== First iteration ====
Rank	Shadow Minister	Portfolio/s
1	Rt Hon Helen Clark	Leader of the Opposition; Shadow Minister of Security Intelligence Services
2	Hon Michael Cullen	Deputy Leader of the Opposition; Shadow Minister of Finance; Shadow Minister of Statistics
3	Rt Hon Mike Moore	Shadow Minister of Foreign Affairs; Shadow Minister of Overseas Trade
4	Steve Maharey	Shadow Minister for Labour; Shadow Minister of Employment
5	Rt Hon Jonathan Hunt	Shadow Leader of the House; Shadow Minister of Constitutional Affairs
6	Hon Phil Goff	Shadow Minister of Justice; Shadow Attorney-General; Shadow Minister of Corrections; Shadow Minister of Courts
7	Hon Annette King	Shadow Minister of Social Welfare; Shadow Minister of Immigration; Shadow Minister of Racing
8	Lianne Dalziel	Shadow Minister of Health
9	Hon Jim Sutton	Shadow Minister of Agriculture; Shadow Minister of Treaty Negotiations; Shadow Minister of Lands; Shadow Minister of Fisheries; Shadow Minister of Forestry
10	Trevor Mallard	Shadow Minister of Education; Shadow Minister of State Services; Shadow Minister of Internal Affairs; Shadow Minister of Sport and Recreation
11	Pete Hodgson	Shadow Minister of Conservation; Shadow Minister for the Environment; Shadow Minister of Industry; Shadow Minister of Energy
12	Graham Kelly	Shadow Minister of Housing; Shadow Minister of Overseas Aid
13	Paul Swain	Shadow Minister of Commerce; Shadow Minister of State Owned Enterprises
14	Judy Keall	Shadow Minister of Senior Citizens; Shadow Minister of Consumer Affairs
15	Geoff Braybrooke	Shadow Minister of Defence; Shadow Minister of Veterans Affairs; Shadow Minister of War Pensions
16	George Hawkins	Shadow Minister of Police; Shadow Minister of Serious Fraud Office
17	Ross Robertson	Shadow Minister of Regional Development; Shadow Minister of Small Business
18	Judith Tizard	Shadow Minister of Local Government; Shadow Minister of Cultural Affairs
19	Harry Duynhoven	Shadow Minister of Transport; Shadow Minister of Civil Aviation
20	Larry Sutherland	Shadow Minister of Family Affairs
21	Mark Burton	Senior Whip; Shadow Minister of Adult & Community Education
22	Rick Barker	Junior Whip; Shadow Minister of Customs
23	Ruth Dyson	Shadow Minister of ACC; Shadow Minister of Disability Services
24	Taito Phillip Field	Shadow Minister of Pacific Island Affairs
25	Janet Mackey	Shadow Minister of Civil Defence
26	Damien O'Connor	Shadow Minister of Tourism
27	Mark Peck	Shadow Minister of Revenue
28	Jill Pettis	Shadow Minister of Youth Affairs
29	Dianne Yates	Shadow Minister of Women's Affairs; Shadow Minister of Disarmament and Arms Control
30	Tim Barnett	Shadow Minister of Urban Affairs
31	Mark Gosche	Shadow Minister of Ethnic Affairs; Shadow Minister for Public Transport
32	Joe Hawke	Shadow Minister of Economic Development; Shadow Minister of Employment
33	Marian Hobbs	Shadow Minister of Broadcasting; Shadow Minister of Communications; Shadow Minister of Information Technology
34	Nanaia Mahuta	Shadow Minister of Maori Education
35	Dover Samuels	Shadow Minister of Maori Affairs
36	Tariana Turia	Shadow Minister of Maori Health & Youth Issues

==== Final iteration ====
Rank	Shadow Minister	Portfolio/s
1	Rt Hon Helen Clark	Leader of the Opposition; Shadow Minister of Security Intelligence Services
2	Hon Michael Cullen	Deputy Leader of the Opposition; Shadow Minister of Finance
3	Steve Maharey	Shadow Minister for Social Welfare; Shadow Minister of Employment
4	Rt Hon Jonathan Hunt	Shadow Leader of the House; Shadow Minister of Constitutional Affairs
5	Hon Phil Goff	Shadow Minister of Foreign Affairs; Shadow Minister of Justice; Shadow Minister of Corrections; Shadow Minister of Courts
6	Hon Annette King	Shadow Minister of Health
7	Lianne Dalziel	Shadow Attorney-General; Shadow Minister of Immigration; Shadow Minister of Youth Affairs; Shadow Minister of Statistics
8	Hon Jim Sutton	Shadow Minister of Agriculture; Shadow Minister of Trade; Shadow Minister of Treaty Negotiations; Shadow Minister of Lands; Shadow Minister of Fisheries
9	Trevor Mallard	Shadow Minister of Education; Shadow Minister of Internal Affairs; Shadow Minister of Sport
10	Pete Hodgson	Shadow Minister of Labour; Shadow Minister of Industry; Shadow Minister of Energy; Shadow Minister of Forestry
11	Graham Kelly	Shadow Minister of Housing; Shadow Minister of Overseas Aid
12	Paul Swain	Shadow Minister of Commerce; Shadow Minister of State Owned Enterprises
13	Judy Keall	Shadow Minister of Senior Citizens; Shadow Minister of Consumer Affairs
14	Geoff Braybrooke	Shadow Minister of Defence; Shadow Minister of Veterans Affairs; Shadow Minister of War Pensions
15	George Hawkins	Shadow Minister of Police; Shadow Minister of Serious Fraud Office
16	Ross Robertson	Shadow Minister of Regional Development; Shadow Minister of Small Business
17	Judith Tizard	Shadow Minister of Local Government; Shadow Minister of Cultural Affairs
18	Harry Duynhoven	Shadow Minister of Transport; Shadow Minister of Civil Aviation
19	Larry Sutherland	Shadow Minister of Family Affairs
20	Mark Burton	Senior Whip; Shadow Minister of Adult & Community Education
21	Rick Barker	Junior Whip; Shadow Minister of Customs
22	Ruth Dyson	Shadow Minister of ACC; Shadow Minister of Disability Services
23	Taito Phillip Field	Shadow Minister of Pacific Island Affairs
24	Janet Mackey	Shadow Minister of Civil Defense
25	Damien O'Connor	Shadow Minister of Tourism; Shadow Minister of Racing
26	Mark Peck	Shadow Minister of Revenue
27	Jill Pettis	Shadow Minister of Conservation
28	Dianne Yates	Shadow Minister of Women's Affairs; Shadow Minister of Disarmament and Arms Control
29	Tim Barnett	Shadow Minister of Human Rights; Shadow Minister of Urban Affairs
30	Mark Gosche	Shadow Minister of Ethnic Affairs; Shadow Minister of Public Transport
31	Joe Hawke	Shadow Minister of Economic Development; Shadow Minister of Employment
32	Marian Hobbs	Shadow Minister of Broadcasting; Shadow Minister of Communications; Shadow Minister of Information Technology
33	Nanaia Mahuta	Shadow Minister of Maori Education
34	Dover Samuels	Shadow Minister of Maori Affairs
35	Tariana Turia	Shadow Minister of Maori Health & Youth Issues
