= Jim Gerard =

New Zealand politician (born 1936)

Jim Gerard QSO

17th High Commissioner of New Zealand to Canada
- In office April 1997 – May 2000
- Prime Minister: Jim Bolger; Jenny Shipley; Helen Clark
- Preceded by: Maurice McTigue
- Succeeded by: Wade Armstrong

1st Deputy Speaker of the New Zealand House of Representatives
- In office 10 November 1992 – 12 October 1996
- Speaker: Robin Gray; Peter Tapsell
- Preceded by: Himself (as Chairman of Committees)
- Succeeded by: Ian Revell

33rd Chairman of Committees
- In office 29 November 1990 – 10 November 1992
- Speaker: Robin Gray
- Deputy: Robert Anderson; Joy Quigley
- Preceded by: John Terris
- Succeeded by: Himself (as Deputy Speaker)

Member of the New Zealand Parliament for National Party list
- In office 12 October 1996 – 22 April 1997
- Succeeded by: Annabel Young (Note: Normally, list MPs do not have individual predecessors or successors, but Gerard resigned during a sitting parliament and therefore was succeeded by Young.)

Member of the New Zealand Parliament for Rangiora
- In office 14 July 1984 – 12 October 1996
- Preceded by: Derek Quigley
- Succeeded by: Electorate abolished

Personal details
- Born: Richard James Gerard; 20 October 1936 (age 90) Christchurch, New Zealand
- Party: National
- Parent: Geoff Gerard (father)
- Education: Christ's College, Christchurch

Richard James Gerard QSO (born 20 October 1936) is a New Zealand politician. He was a member of Parliament for the National Party from 1984 to 1997 – first as the member for Rangiora from 1984 to 1996, and then as a party list MP from 1996 to 1997. He was the chairman of committees from 1990 to 1992, and Parliament's first deputy speaker from 1992 to 1996. He subsequently served as the high commissioner to Canada from 1997 to 2000. He was elected the mayor of Waimakariri in 2001 and served two terms until being defeated in 2007. He later served as a Waimakariri district councillor between 2010 and 2016, since when he has been a member of the Rangiora–Ashley Community Board.

== Early life and family ==
Gerard was born in Christchurch on 20 October 1936. His father was the National MP Geoff Gerard. Gerard received his education at Christ's College and then became a sheep farmer in Cheviot. He held several roles with Federated Farmers.

Gerard married Mary Linn Minson, and the couple had three children together. He also has three stepchildren.

== Political career ==
Gerard served on the Oxford County Council for some time. He was the National Party chair of the Rangiora electorate for eight years.

=== Member of Parliament ===
New Zealand Parliament
Years	Term	Electorate	List	Party
1984–1987	41st	Rangiora		National
1987–1990	42nd	Rangiora		National
1990–1993	43rd	Rangiora		National
1993–1996	44th	Rangiora		National
1996–1997	45th	List	17	National

He was first elected to Parliament in the 1984 election, replacing the retiring Derek Quigley in the Rangiora electorate. He remained MP for Rangiora until the 1996 election, when the electorate was abolished. Gerard was unsuccessful in his campaign for the new Waimakariri electorate, losing to former Labour Party leader Mike Moore. He remained in Parliament as a list MP.

In 1990, Gerard was elected Chairman of Committees. Until 1992, the Chairman of Committees was known as the Deputy Speaker only when presiding over the House. On 10 November 1992, the position of Deputy Speaker was made official under the Standing Orders, and the role of Chairman of Committees was discontinued, with Gerard becoming the first Deputy Speaker. He held that role until 13 December 1996.

In April 1997, he resigned from Parliament to become New Zealand's High Commissioner to Canada in Ottawa. This was the first resignation by a list MP since New Zealand adopted the mixed-member proportional electoral system. Gerard was replaced by the next candidate on National's party list, Annabel Young.

In 1990, Gerard received the New Zealand 1990 Commemoration Medal. In the 1999 New Year Honours, he was appointed a Companion of the Queen's Service Order for public services.

=== Waimakariri District ===
Gerard was elected Mayor of Waimakariri in 2001. He was re-elected in 2004, but lost the mayoralty in 2007 to Ron Keating. In October 2010, he was elected councillor for Waimakariri and was again returned to that role in 2013. At the 2016 local elections, Gerard did not contest a councillor position; instead, he contested and was elected to the Rangiora–Ashley community board, and has subsequently been re-elected in 2019, 2022, and 2025.

== Notes ==
New Zealand Parliament
Preceded by Derek Quigley	Member of Parliament for Rangiora; 1984–1996	Electorate abolished
Preceded by John Terris	Chairman of Committees of the House of Representatives; 1990–1992	Position abolished
New post	Deputy speaker of the House of Representatives; 1992–1996	Succeeded by Ian Revell
