= Peter Tapsell (New Zealand politician) =

New Zealand Maori politician and surgeon (1930–2012)

The Honourable Sir Peter Tapsell KNZM MBE FRCS FRCSEd
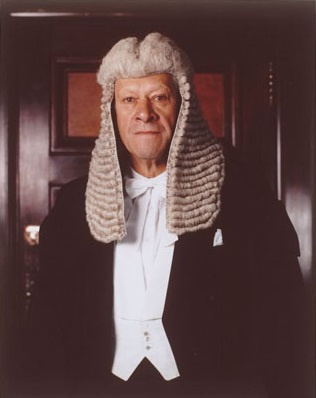
- Tapsell as Speaker

24th Speaker of the House of Representatives
- In office 21 December 1993 – 12 December 1996
- Prime Minister: Jim Bolger
- Preceded by: Robin Gray
- Succeeded by: Doug Kidd

30th Minister of Defence
- In office 9 February 1990 – 2 November 1990
- Prime Minister: Geoffrey Palmer
- Preceded by: Bob Tizard
- Succeeded by: Warren Cooper

Personal details
- Born: Peter Wilfred Tapsell; 21 January 1930 Rotorua, New Zealand
- Died: 5 April 2012 (aged 82) Ruatoria, New Zealand
- Party: Labour
- Relatives: Tania Tapsell (great-niece)

Sir Peter Wilfred Tapsell KNZM MBE FRCS FRCSEd (21 January 1930 – 5 April 2012) was Speaker of the New Zealand House of Representatives from 1993 to 1996. He was notable for being the first Māori Speaker, and for being the first Speaker since Bill Barnard in 1943 to hold office while not a member of the governing party.

He was an orthopaedic surgeon before entering politics.

== Early life ==
Peter Wilfred Tapsell was born in 1930. His father Pita was a grandson of the early Danish-born trader Phillip Tapsell and Hine-i-tūrama Ngātiki.

Tapsell was born and raised in Rotorua, and went to Rotorua Boys' High School. With the help of a scholarship, he studied medicine at the University of Otago, graduating in 1952.

He worked at several hospitals throughout New Zealand before travelling to the United Kingdom to undertake further study. Upon his return to New Zealand, he took up a position in Rotorua. Highly active in Māori cultural organisations, Tapsell was made a Member of the Order of the British Empire in the 1968 Queen's Birthday Honours, for services to medicine and the Māori people.

== Member of Parliament ==
New Zealand Parliament
Years	Term	Electorate	Party
1981–1984	40th	Eastern Maori	Labour
1984–1987	41st	Eastern Maori	Labour
1987–1990	42nd	Eastern Maori	Labour
1990–1993	43rd	Eastern Maori	Labour
1993–1996	44th	Eastern Maori	Labour

Tapsell stood as the Labour Party candidate for Rotorua in the 1975 election and the 1978 election, but was not successful in entering Parliament until the 1981 election, when he stood as a candidate in the Eastern Maori electorate. In 1983 he was appointed as Labour's spokesperson for Youth Affairs and Sport and Recreation by Labour leader David Lange.

=== Cabinet Minister ===
He was a minister in the Fourth Labour Government. At various stages of his parliamentary career, Tapsell served as Minister of Internal Affairs, Minister for the Arts, Minister of Police, Minister of Civil Defence, Minister of Science, Minister of Forestry, and Minister of Defence.

=== Speaker of the House of Representatives ===
After the 1993 election, the National Party had a majority of only one seat. The appointment of the Speaker, therefore, presented a problem – if National selected a Speaker from among its own ranks, as was traditional, it would lose its majority, since the Speaker was not permitted to vote at that time. Therefore, Prime Minister Jim Bolger decided to offer the Speaker's position to a member of the Labour Party, thereby retaining the crucial vote. Tapsell was the person chosen by Bolger for this role.

Despite many objections from his Labour Party colleagues, Tapsell opted to accept the position. His elevation was not unchallenged, however, with an objection being raised by Winston Peters and his New Zealand First party. Peters claimed that his objection was on behalf of the incumbent Speaker, long-serving National MP Robin Gray, who had expected to resume his duties but was now being "cast aside" for political reasons. Critics of Peters, however, claimed that New Zealand First merely wanted to leave National and Labour deadlocked, as it would be New Zealand First that held the balance of power in that situation. Robin Gray, however, refused the nomination, and Tapsell took the Speaker's chair unopposed.

== Retirement ==
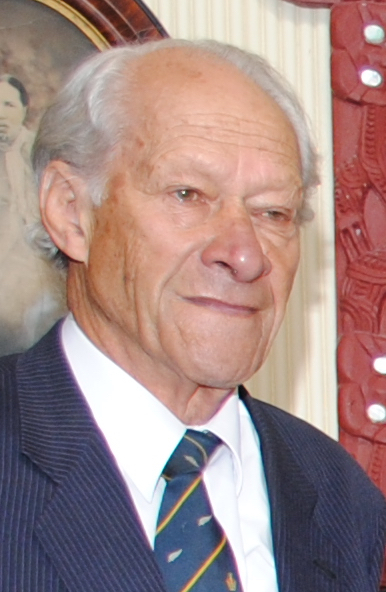
Tapsell in 2011

In the 1996 election, however, Tapsell lost the electorate, now called Te Tai Rawhiti, by 4215 votes to New Zealand First's Tuariki Delamere, one of the Tight Five. Tapsell had not been put on the party list. This was part of a major shift away from the Labour Party by Māori voters, with New Zealand First capturing all of the Māori electorates. Whether Tapsell would have retained the Speaker's role is uncertain, as a reform of Parliamentary procedure meant the Speaker no longer lost their vote. The loss of his electorate seat, however, prompted Tapsell's retirement from politics.

In 1991, Tapsell's family was struck with tragedy when his daughter killed his mother. In the subsequent trial, she was judged not guilty by reason of insanity.

In the 1997 New Year Honours, Tapsell was appointed a Knight Companion of the New Zealand Order of Merit, for public services, lately as Speaker of the House of Representatives.

After his retirement, Tapsell was involved in a number of organisations, becoming the Patron of Monarchy New Zealand. He also assisted several medical charities, and the University of Waikato awarded him an honorary doctorate in 1997. In 2006, Tapsell spoke at an event with Hak Ja Han, wife of Unification Church leader Sun Myung Moon, and praised their teaching of a "concept of the ideal family as comprising a father, a mother, children and grandparents" living together in a three generation extended family, as being "very Māori."

Political offices
Preceded by Ann Hercus	Minister of Police; 1987–1989	Succeeded by Roger Douglas
Preceded by Koro Wētere	Minister for Land Information; 1987–1990	Succeeded by Rob Storey
Preceded by Robin Gray	Speaker of the New Zealand House of Representatives; 1993–1996	Succeeded by Doug Kidd
New Zealand Parliament
Preceded by Paraone Reweti	Member of Parliament for Eastern Maori; 1981–1996	Constituency abolished
