= 1997 New Zealand National Party leadership election =

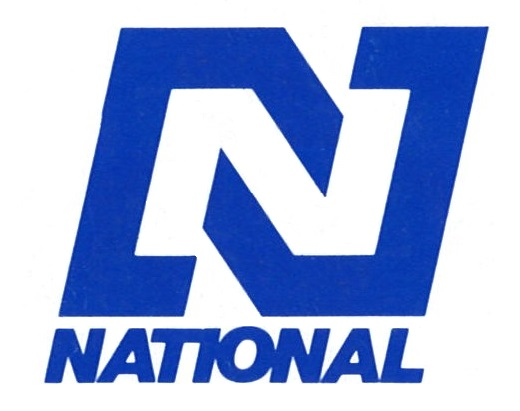
← 1986	8 December 1997	2001 →
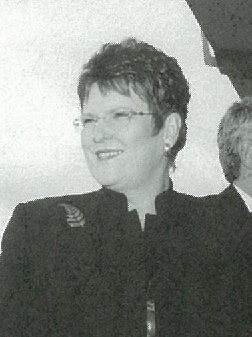
Candidate	Jenny Shipley
Popular vote	elected unopposed
Leader before election
Jim Bolger
Leader after election
Jenny Shipley

An election for the position of leader of the New Zealand National Party occurred in 1997. Jim Bolger, the incumbent leader and prime minister, ended up losing his position.

Transport Minister Jenny Shipley grew increasingly frustrated and disillusioned with the cautious pace of National's leader, Jim Bolger, and with what she saw as the disproportionate influence of coalition partner New Zealand First. She began gathering support to replace Bolger in mid-1997. Shipley struck later that year, while Bolger attended the Commonwealth Heads of Government Meeting. She convinced a majority of her National Party colleagues to back her bid for the leadership. When Bolger returned to New Zealand, he discovered that Shipley was not only planning to challenge his leadership, but had lined up enough support in the party room to defeat him. Facing an untenable situation, he resigned, and Shipley was unanimously elected to replace him.

As leader of the governing party, she became Prime Minister on 8 December 1997.
