= Senior Whip of the National Party =

Party leadership position in the New Zealand Parliamentary system

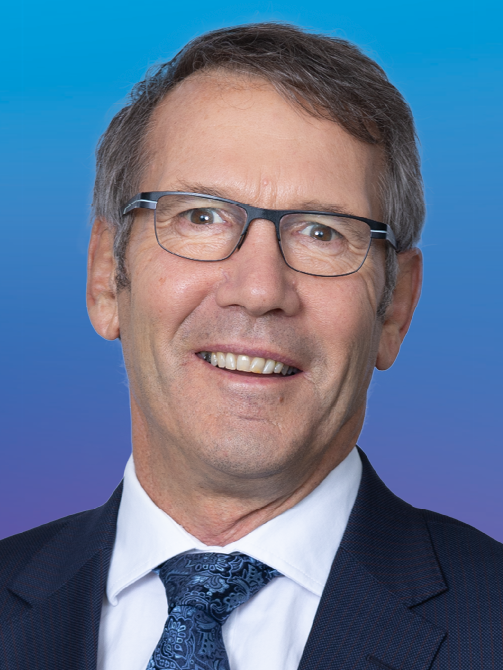
- Incumbent; Stuart Smith since 4 March 2025
- Reports to: Leader of the National Party
- Precursor: Scott Simpson
- Inaugural holder: Bert Kyle
- Formation: 14 May 1936
- Deputy: Suze Redmayne

The New Zealand National Party's Senior Whip administers the "whipping in" system that tries to ensure that party MPs attend and vote according to the party leadership's wishes. The position is elected by the National caucus members. The Senior Whip also acts as an intermediary between the backbenchers and the party leadership. Whenever National is in government the senior whip serves as the Chief Government Whip and when out of government serves as Chief Opposition Whip.

All National whips have been members of the House of Representatives, with none coming from the Legislative Council before its abolition in 1950.

The current whips are Stuart Smith (MP for Kaikōura—senior whip), appointed 4 March 2025, and Suze Redmayne (MP for Rangitīkei—junior whip) and Dana Kirkpatrick (MP for East Coast—third whip), appointed 5 December 2023.

== List ==
The following is a list of all senior whips of the National Party:

No.	Name	Portrait	Electorate	Term of office	
1	Bert Kyle		Riccarton	14 May 1936	12 March 1941
2	Walter Broadfoot		Waitomo	12 March 1941	13 December 1949
3	Andy Sutherland		Hauraki	2 March 1950	4 October 1954
4	Geoff Gerard		Ashburton	24 November 1954	8 February 1957
5	Ernest Aderman		New Plymouth	8 February 1957	21 January 1958
(4)	Geoff Gerard		Ashburton	21 January 1958	12 December 1960
6	Jack Scott		Rodney	16 February 1961	20 December 1963
7	Jack George		Otago Central	10 June 1964	11 February 1967
8	Alfred E. Allen		Franklin	11 February 1967	5 February 1970
9	Harry Lapwood		Rotorua	5 February 1970	11 July 1974
10	Richard Harrison		Hawke's Bay	11 July 1974	22 January 1976
11	Bill Birch		Franklin	22 January 1976	1 February 1979
12	Tony Friedlander		New Plymouth	1 February 1979	2 February 1982
13	Don McKinnon		Albany	2 February 1982	29 July 1987
14	Robin Gray		Clutha	16 September 1987	6 September 1990
15	Jeff Grant		Awarua	28 November 1990	23 September 1993
16	John Carter		Far North	30 November 1993	3 April 1995
17	Roger Sowry		Kapiti	3 April 1995	12 October 1996
(16)	John Carter		Northland	19 December 1996	9 August 2004
18	Simon Power		Rangitikei	9 August 2004	17 September 2005
19	Lindsay Tisch		Piako	11 October 2005	5 December 2006
20	Anne Tolley		East Coast	5 December 2006	13 February 2008
21	Nathan Guy		Ōtaki	13 February 2008	15 June 2009
22	Chris Tremain		Napier	16 June 2009	13 December 2011
23	Michael Woodhouse		List MP	20 December 2011	28 January 2013
24	Louise Upston		Taupō	29 January 2013	7 October 2014
25	Tim Macindoe		Hamilton West	20 October 2014	2 May 2017
26	Jami-Lee Ross		Botany	2 May 2017	20 March 2018
27	Barbara Kuriger		Taranaki-King Country	20 March 2018	10 November 2020
28	Matt Doocey		Waimakariri	10 November 2020	7 December 2021
29	Chris Penk		Kaipara ki Mahurangi	7 December 2021	5 December 2023
30	Scott Simpson		Coromandel	5 December 2023	4 March 2025
31	Stuart Smith		Kaikōura	4 March 2025	Incumbent

== See also ==
- Senior Whip of the Labour Party
- Senior Whip of the Liberal Party

== Bibliography ==
- Wilson, James Oakley (1985) [First published in 1913]. New Zealand Parliamentary Record, 1840–1984 (4th ed.). Wellington: V.R. Ward, Govt. Printer. OCLC 154283103.
