= Denis Marshall (politician) =

New Zealand politician (born 1943)

The Honourable Denis Marshall QSO

5th Secretary-General of the Commonwealth Parliamentary Association
- In office 2002–2006
- Preceded by: Art Donahoe
- Succeeded by: William Shija

4th Minister of Conservation
- In office 2 November 1990 – 30 May 1996
- Prime Minister: Jim Bolger
- Preceded by: Philip Woollaston
- Succeeded by: Simon Upton

42nd Minister of Lands
- In office 2 November 1993 – 10 December 1996
- Prime Minister: Jim Bolger
- Preceded by: Rob Storey
- Succeeded by: John Luxton

Member of the New Zealand Parliament for Rangitikei
- In office 14 July 1984 – 27 November 1999
- Preceded by: Bruce Beetham
- Succeeded by: Simon Power

Personal details
- Born: Denis William Anson Marshall; 23 September 1943 (age 83) Marton, New Zealand
- Party: National

Denis William Anson Marshall QSO (born 23 September 1943) is a former New Zealand politician. He was an MP from 1984 to 1999, representing the National Party, and a government minister until 1996. His ministerial career ended when he resigned about six months after the release of the Commission of Inquiry report into the Cave Creek Disaster, and a year after the accident itself, in which 14 people died and a further four were seriously injured, and during which time he was minister of conservation. He had been under pressure to resign since the report's release.

== Early life ==
Born in Marton on 23 September 1943, Marshall was educated at Norwood School, Gisborne, Hereworth School, Havelock North, Christ's College, Christchurch and Lincoln College as part of the Kellogg New Zealand Rural Leadership Programme, and he was a Nuffield Farming Scholar to the United Kingdom in 1983.

In 1965, he married Mary Annette Kilmister, and the couple went on to have three children.

== Member of Parliament ==
New Zealand Parliament
Years	Term	Electorate	List	Party
1984–1987	41st	Rangitikei		National
1987–1990	42nd	Rangitikei		National
1990–1993	43rd	Rangitikei		National
1993–1996	44th	Rangitikei		National
1996–1999	45th	Rangitikei	32	National

Marshall was a member of the New Zealand House of Representatives from 1984 to 1999. Having joined the National Party in the 1970s, he was first elected to Parliament for Rangitikei in the 1984 election, defeating Social Credit Party leader Bruce Beetham. He held the seat against Beetham in the 1987 election and retained it until his retirement at the 1999 election.

== Cabinet minister ==
Marshall served in a number of ministerial roles, beginning in 1993 and ending in 1996. He was Minister of Lands, Valuation, Department of Survey Land & Information from 1993 to 1996, and Minister of Forestry in 1996. Other notable positions between 1997 and 1999 include Chairman of the Parliamentary Select Committee on Transport and Environment Committee, Chairman of Special Select Committee on Dairy Industry Restructuring, and Producer Boarder Reform.

=== Minister of conservation ===
Marshall's best-known post was as minister of conservation from 1990 to 1996 during which he also acted as associate minister of agriculture and associate minister of employment. He resigned from his role as a minister in May 1996, roughly a year following the April 1995 Cave Creek disaster, in which 14 people died. A commission of inquiry found that whilst many individual mistakes contributed to the accident, a root cause was that the Department of Conservation had been under-funded and under-resourced for the role it was expected to achieve, and from the time of its creation in 1987 it had remained disorganised internally with few consistently used project and safety management systems, or formally qualified staff for much of the required work. Intense scrutiny of the minister followed, as well as scrutiny of the government's funding priorities.

He did not resign immediately following the release of the report, claiming that his resignation would not remedy the situation, and citing a quotation of Sir Geoffrey Palmer which stated that ministers weren't personally responsible for everything done in their name, as they could not be expected to know or authorise everything that occurred. Criticism that he had been the minister of conservation for five years during which time it had remained in a disorganised state, however, eventually ended with his resignation about six months later.

== Life after politics ==
Marshall retired from Parliament in 1999 and moved to London. He took up a full-time post as secretary-general at the Commonwealth Parliamentary Association (CPA) from January 2002 to December 2006.

He has been consulting to the UNDP and the WBI over the past four years.

He now lives in Queenstown, Central Otago, New Zealand, where he is a vigneron of his own vineyard, Hawkshead Wine, a producer of pinot noir, pinot gris, riesling and sauvignon blanc.

== Community ==
In 2000, he founded the New Zealand National Parks and Conservation Foundation following his strong belief that there needed to be an opportunity for the private sector and corporate world to contribute more to conservation in New Zealand. He was the foundation's inaugural chairman from 2000 to 2001.

He was the chairman of the New Zealand Rural Communities Trust from 2000 to 2001.

He is a member in numerous community organisations in New Zealand, such as the New Zealand Historic Places Trust and the Royal Forest and Bird Protection Society.

== Honours ==
In 1990, Marshall was awarded the New Zealand 1990 Commemoration Medal. In the 2000 New Year Honours, he was appointed a Companion of the Queen's Service Order for public services.

New Zealand Parliament
Preceded by Bruce Beetham	Member of Parliament for Rangitikei; 1984–1999	Succeeded by Simon Power
Political offices
Preceded by Rob Storey	Minister for Land Information; 1993–1996	Succeeded by John Luxton
