= Rob Storey =

New Zealand politician (1936–2019)

The Honourable Rob Storey QSO

16th Minister of Transport
- In office 2 November 1990 – 29 November 1993
- Preceded by: Bill Jeffries
- Succeeded by: Maurice Williamson

Member of the New Zealand Parliament for Waikato
- In office 1984–1996
- Preceded by: Simon Upton
- Succeeded by: Constituency abolished

President of Federated Farmers
- In office 1981–1984
- Preceded by: Allan Wright
- Succeeded by: Peter Elworthy

Personal details
- Born: William Robson Storey; 16 July 1936
- Died: 2 August 2019 (aged 83) Te Awamutu, New Zealand
- Party: National
- Spouse: Lorraine Storey (m. c. 1960)
- Occupation: Farmer

William Robson Storey QSO (16 July 1936 – 2 August 2019), generally known as Rob Storey, was a New Zealand farmer and politician. He served as president of Federated Farmers between 1981 and 1984, and was a National Member of Parliament for 12 years from 1984.

== Early life and career ==
Before entering politics, Storey was a farmer at Waiterimu in the Waikato, and was the president of Federated Farmers from 1981 to 1984. He was educated at Wesley College, Auckland.

== Member of Parliament ==
New Zealand Parliament
Years	Term	Electorate	Party
1984–1987	41st	Waikato	National
1987–1990	42nd	Waikato	National
1990–1993	43rd	Waikato	National
1993–1996	44th	Waikato	National

Storey was elected MP for Waikato in the 1984 election, representing the National Party. He retained that seat until his retirement at the 1996 election.

Storey was appointed a minister in the first term of the Fourth National Government. Between 1990 and 1993, he held office principally as Minister of Transport and also served as Minister of Statistics (until October 1991), Minister for the Environment (from October 1991), Minister of Lands, Minister of Survey and Land Information and Minister in Charge of the Valuation Department. He was not reappointed a minister after the 1993 election and retired three years later. One of his achievements as Minister of Transport was overseeing the merger of the Ministry of Transport's traffic enforcement fleet into the New Zealand Police in 1993. Under Storey, compulsory bicycle helmet wearing legislation was introduced on 1 January 1994.

== Honours ==
In 1990, Storey received the New Zealand 1990 Commemoration Medal. In the 2007 New Year Honours, he was appointed a Companion of the Queen's Service Order for public services. His wife, Lorraine, had received the same honour, for community service, in the 1997 New Year Honours.

== Death ==
Storey died in Te Awamutu on 2 August 2019, after 59 years of marriage. His wife, Lorraine, died in Hamilton on 6 January 2024.

New Zealand Parliament
Preceded by Simon Upton	Member of Parliament for Waikato; 1984–1996	Vacant Constituency abolished, recreated in 2008 Title next held by Lindsay Tisch
Political offices
Preceded by Peter Tapsell	Minister for Land Information; 1990–1993	Succeeded by Denis Marshall
