= Doug Kidd =

New Zealand politician

The Honourable Sir Douglas Kidd KNZM
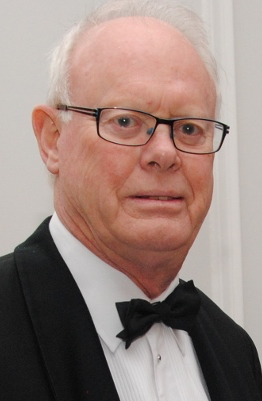
- Kidd in 2014

25th Speaker of the House of Representatives
- In office 12 December 1996 – 20 December 1999
- Prime Minister: Jim Bolger; Jenny Shipley; Helen Clark
- Preceded by: Peter Tapsell
- Succeeded by: Jonathan Hunt
- Constituency: Kaikoura

Personal details
- Born: 12 September 1941 (age 85) Levin, New Zealand
- Party: National

Sir Douglas Lorimer Kidd KNZM (born 12 September 1941) is a former New Zealand politician. He was an MP from 1978 to 2002, representing the National Party. He served for three years as Speaker of the House of Representatives.

== Early life ==
Kidd was born in Levin. From 1960 to 1964, he served in the New Zealand Army Territorial Force as a bombardier gunlayer. He later obtained a LLB from Victoria University of Wellington, and worked as a lawyer. He also had business interests in aquaculture, forestry, and wine making.

== Member of Parliament ==
New Zealand Parliament
Years	Term	Electorate	List	Party
1978–1981	39th	Marlborough		National
1981–1984	40th	Marlborough		National
1984–1987	41st	Marlborough		National
1987–1990	42nd	Marlborough		National
1990–1993	43rd	Marlborough		National
1993–1996	44th	Marlborough		National
1996–1999	45th	Kaikoura	14	National
1999–2002	46th	List	17	National

Kidd was first elected to Parliament in the 1978 election, becoming MP for Marlborough. In the government of Jim Bolger, Kidd held a number of minor ministerial portfolios, including Fisheries, Energy and Labour. He held his Marlborough electorate until the 1996 election, when the electorate was abolished and most of its area incorporated into the new and larger Kaikoura electorate. Kidd came first in Kaikoura in 1996. In the following election he sought election as a list MP only. He was succeeded in Kaikoura by Lynda Scott and retired from Parliament at the 2002 election.

=== Status of the Unborn Child Bill ===
In 1983 Kidd's anti-abortion Status of the Unborn Child Bill (a private members bill) was drawn from the lot. The bill was prompted by Wall v Livingston [1982], which clarified that embryos and foetuses had no legal status in New Zealand and that third parties could not appeal to the courts on their behalf. The bill was supported by groups such as Society for the Protection of the Unborn Child (now Voice for Life and Right to Life New Zealand) but defeated by pro-choice groups led by Marilyn Waring.

=== Speaker of the House ===
After the 1996 election, Kidd was elected Speaker of the House of Representatives; Derek Quigley also contested the position. He replaced Peter Tapsell, a Labour Party MP who had held the speakership because National, which had won the election by a single seat, did not want to lose a vote by appointing a Speaker from its own ranks. Kidd lost the speakership when the National Party lost the 1999 election, being replaced by Jonathan Hunt of the Labour Party. After serving a term in Opposition, he chose to retire from politics at the 2002 election.

== After Parliament ==
In the 2000 Queen's Birthday Honours, Kidd was appointed a Distinguished Companion of the New Zealand Order of Merit, for services as Speaker of the House of Representatives between 1996 and 1999, and he accepted redesignation as a Knight Companion of the New Zealand Order of Merit in August 2009 following the restoration of titular honours by the New Zealand government.

Kidd was appointed to the Waitangi Tribunal in 2004.

Political offices
Preceded by Peter Tapsell	Speaker of the New Zealand House of Representatives; 1996–1999	Succeeded by Jonathan Hunt
New Zealand Parliament
Preceded by Edward Latter	Member of Parliament for Marlborough; 1978–1996	Constituency abolished
New constituency	Member of Parliament for Kaikoura; 1996–1999	Succeeded by Lynda Scott
