= Robin Gray (New Zealand politician) =

New Zealand politician (1931–2022)

The Honourable Sir Robin Gray

23rd Speaker of the House of Representatives
- In office 28 November 1990 – 21 December 1993
- Prime Minister: Jim Bolger
- Preceded by: Kerry Burke
- Succeeded by: Peter Tapsell

Member of the New Zealand Parliament for Clutha
- In office 1978–1996
- Preceded by: Peter Gordon

Personal details
- Born: Robert McDowall Gray; 2 July 1931 Borgue, Scotland
- Died: 2 April 2022 (aged 90) Mosgiel, New Zealand
- Party: National
- Spouse: Mary Muir Thomson (m. 1957; died 1981)
- Children: 3
- Occupation: Farmer

Sir Robert McDowall Gray (2 July 1931 – 2 April 2022), generally known as Robin Gray, was a New Zealand politician. He was an MP from 1978 to 1996, and served as Speaker of the House of Representatives between 1990 and 1993.

== Early life and family ==
Gray was born in Borgue, Kirkcudbrightshire, Scotland on 2 July 1931 to Adam and Elsie Gray. He received his education at Borgue Primary School and at George Watson's Boys College. After serving with the 4th/7th Royal Dragoon Guards from 1949 to 1951 in Africa, he migrated to New Zealand in 1952 to take up farming, initially working on a farm at Tapanui, before moving to his own property at Waitahuna, Central Otago. Gray became a naturalised New Zealand citizen in 1973.

Gray married Mary Muir Thomson in 1957. She was the daughter of Alexander and Lindon Thomson. The couple went on to have three children. Gray was widowed by the death of his wife, Mary, in 1981.

== Member of Parliament ==
New Zealand Parliament
Years	Term	Electorate	Party
1978–1981	39th	Clutha	National
1981–1984	40th	Clutha	National
1984–1987	41st	Clutha	National
1987–1990	42nd	Clutha	National
1990–1993	43rd	Clutha	National
1993–1996	44th	Clutha	National

He joined the National Party in 1956, and held a number of positions in its internal hierarchy. In the 1978 election, he was elected to replace Peter Gordon as MP for Clutha, a safe National seat that practically guaranteed election. He was elected in 1978 and held the electorate until the 1996 election, when it was abolished and he retired.

Gray became the National Party's Junior Whip in 1985 and the Senior Whip in 1987.

=== Speaker of the House of Representatives ===
When National won office in the 1990 election, Gray was made Speaker of the House of Representatives. After the 1993 election, however, the National Party saw its majority pared back to a single seat. As the Speaker could only vote in the event of a tie, re-appointing Gray to the Speakership would leave Parliament deadlocked. National therefore offered the Speakership to Peter Tapsell of the Labour Party. Gray was appointed to the sinecure of Minister of State, and also became Associate Minister of Foreign Affairs.

In the 1994 New Year Honours, Gray was appointed a Knight Bachelor.

As Speaker of the House of Representatives, Gray was entitled to the title of The Honourable, and he was granted use of the honorific for the rest of his life in 1994.

== Life after Parliament ==
After stepping down as an MP, Gray retired to Mosgiel, but continued to make occasional appearances and commentary at various conferences around New Zealand. He was mildly critical of the National Party for failing to promote members' interests at conferences, to which he achieved a degree of success in ensuring delegates had more opportunity for engagement at the formal meetings.

Gray was the founding president on the board of trustees for the New Zealand Business and Parliament Trust. He died at his home in Mosgiel on 2 April 2022.

== Freemason ==
Gray was active as a Freemason from the 1950s. He was initiated at Kirkcudbright the day before he left for New Zealand. He joined the lodge at Tapanui after arriving in New Zealand, before transferring to Lawrence in 195, where he rose to become master in 1971. After retiring from farming, he transferred to Lodge St John 84 in Mosgiel in 1995, and was appointed grand lecturer the following year.

Political offices
Preceded by Kerry Burke	Speaker of the New Zealand House of Representatives; 1990–1993	Succeeded by Peter Tapsell
New Zealand Parliament
Preceded by Peter Gordon	Member of Parliament for Clutha; 1978–1996	Constituency abolished
