= Simon Upton =

New Zealand politician

The Right Honourable Simon Upton
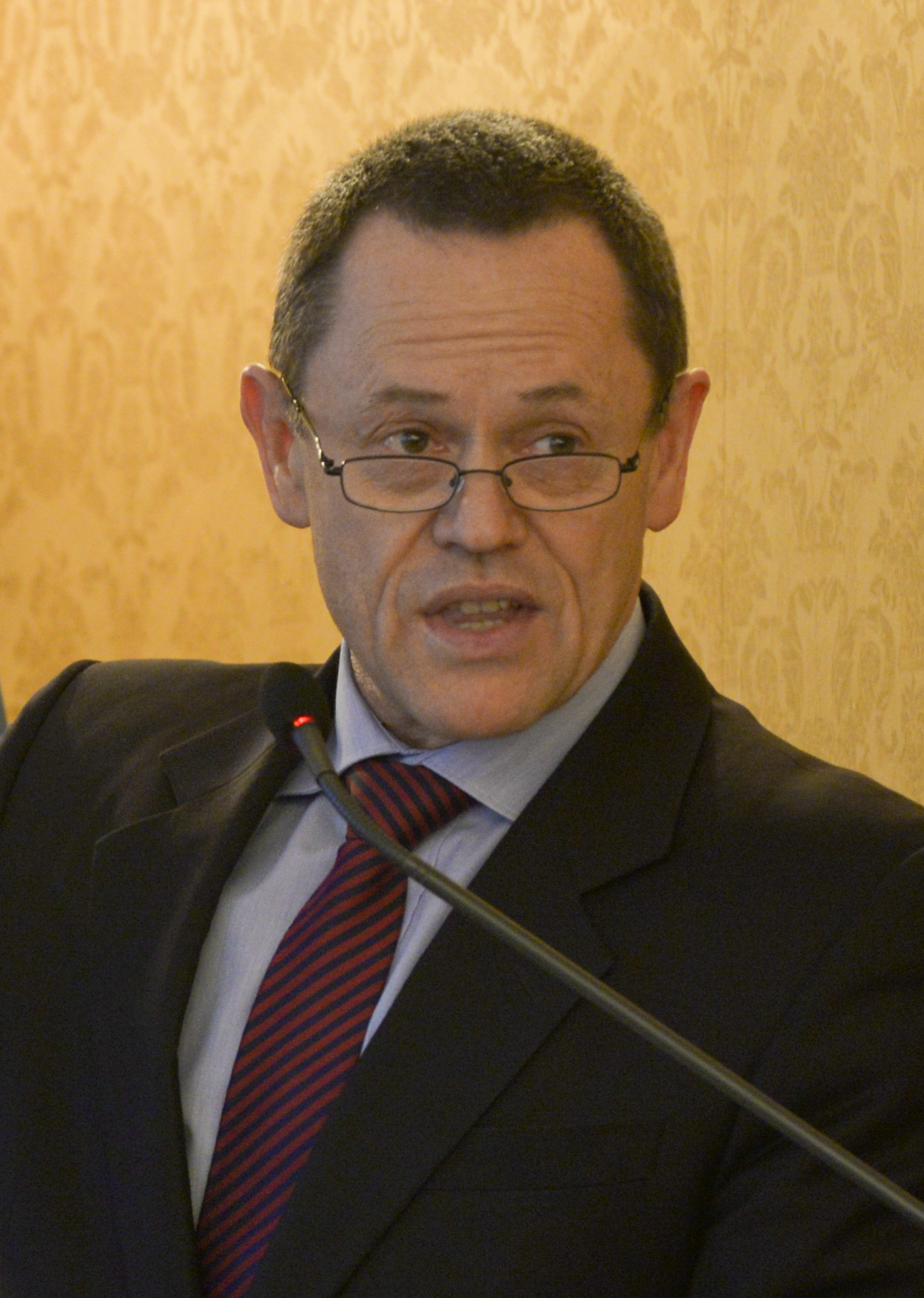
- Simon Upton at a sustainable development Forum in Prague, November 2014

4th Parliamentary Commissioner for the Environment
- Incumbent
- Assumed office 16 October 2017
- Prime Minister: Bill English; Jacinda Ardern; Chris Hipkins; Christopher Luxon
- Preceded by: Jan Wright

9th Minister for the Environment
- In office 29 November 1993 – 10 December 1999
- Prime Minister: Jim Bolger; Jenny Shipley
- Preceded by: Rob Storey
- Succeeded by: Marian Hobbs
- In office 2 November 1990 – 3 October 1991
- Prime Minister: Jim Bolger
- Preceded by: Geoffrey Palmer
- Succeeded by: Rob Storey

30th Minister of Health
- In office 2 November 1990 – 27 March 1993
- Prime Minister: Jim Bolger
- Preceded by: Helen Clark
- Succeeded by: Bill Birch

Member of the New Zealand Parliament for National Party list
- In office 12 October 1996 – 11 January 2001
- Succeeded by: Alec Neill (Note: Normally, list MPs do not have individual predecessors or successors, but Upton resigned during a sitting parliament and therefore was succeeded by Neill.)

Member of the New Zealand Parliament for Raglan
- In office 14 July 1984 – 12 October 1996
- Preceded by: Marilyn Waring (in 1978)

Member of the New Zealand Parliament for Waikato
- In office 28 November 1981 – 14 July 1984
- Preceded by: Lance Adams-Schneider
- Succeeded by: Rob Storey

Personal details
- Born: 7 February 1958 (age 68)
- Party: National

Simon David Upton PC (born 7 February 1958) is a former New Zealand politician and member of Parliament from 1981 to 2001, representing the National Party, and the current Parliamentary Commissioner for the Environment.

== Early life ==
Upton was educated at Southwell School, St Paul's Collegiate School and the University of Auckland, where he gained degrees in English literature, music and law, and Wolfson College, Oxford, as a Rhodes Scholar.

== Member of Parliament ==
New Zealand Parliament
Years	Term	Electorate	List	Party
1981–1984	40th	Waikato		National
1984–1987	41st	Raglan		National
1987–1990	42nd	Raglan		National
1990–1993	43rd	Raglan		National
1993–1996	44th	Raglan		National
1996–1999	45th	List	11	National
1999–2001	46th	List	12	National

Having joined the National Party in 1976, he served as Chairman of the New Zealand Young Nationals among other positions and became the then-youngest MP for Waikato in the 1981 election. In the 1984 election, he was elected MP for Raglan, which he held until the 1996 election, when he chose to become a list MP.

=== Cabinet minister ===
Upton became one of New Zealand's youngest ever Ministers in the Cabinet in 1990, when he became Minister of Health, Minister for the Environment, and Minister of Research, Science and Technology. As Environment minister, Upton promoted the enactment of the Resource Management Act 1991. He was responsible for establishing the Crown Research Institutes. One of Upton's most controversial actions whilst holding the health portfolio was introducing public hospital outpatient charges of up to $50 per night, this was later abandoned as the 1993 election approached. He also has an interest in sustainable development, and chaired the OECD's Round Table on Sustainable Development and is a founding member of the Board of the Holcim Foundation for Sustainable Construction.

Upton was sworn to the Privy Council in 1999.

After National was defeated at the 1999 election Upton was appointed Spokesperson for Foreign Affairs, Superannuation and Culture and Heritage by leader Jenny Shipley.

== Life after politics ==
He resigned from Parliament in 2001, and moved to France. He took up a full-time post at the OECD as the chair of the Round Table on Sustainable Development which he held until 2005. He was also a part-time consultant at PriceWaterhouseCoopers for several years. In April 2010 he was appointed as the head of the OECD Environment Directorate, in Paris, France.

In April 2017, he was appointed by Parliament to be the next Parliamentary Commissioner for the Environment. He replaced the previous commissioner, Jan Wright, when her second five-year term ended in October 2017.

== Personal life ==
He has two adult children.

== Notes ==
New Zealand Parliament
Preceded by Lance Adams-Schneider	Member of Parliament for Waikato; 1981–1984	Succeeded by Rob Storey
Vacant Constituency abolished in 1978 Title last held by Marilyn Waring	Member of Parliament for Raglan; 1984–1996	Constituency abolished
Political offices
Preceded by Helen Clark	Minister of Health; 1990–1993	Succeeded by Bill Birch
Preceded by Geoffrey Palmer	Minister for the Environment; 1990–1991 1993–1999	Succeeded by Rob Storey
Preceded by Rob Storey	Minister for the Environment; 1990–1991 1993–1999	Succeeded by Marian Hobbs
