= Ngongotahā =

Suburb of Rotorua, New Zealand

- Suburb
- Interactive map of Ngongotahā
- Coordinates: 38.083°S 176.214°E
- Country: New Zealand
- Region: Bay of Plenty
- Local authority: Rotorua Lakes District
- Ward: Te Ipu Wai Auraki General Ward; Rotorua Rural General Ward
- Electorates: Rotorua; Waiariki (Māori)

Government
  - Territorial authority: Rotorua Lakes Council
  - Regional council: Bay of Plenty Regional Council
  - Mayor of Rotorua: Tania Tapsell
  - Rotorua MP: Todd McClay
  - Waiariki MP: Rawiri Waititi

Area
  - Total: 12.91 km^{2} (4.98 sq mi)

Population (June 2025)
  - Total: 5,280
  - Density: 409/km^{2} (1,060/sq mi)
- Postcode(s): 3010, 3097

Ngongotahā is a small settlement on the western shores of Lake Rotorua in the North Island of New Zealand. It is located 10 km (6.2 mi) northwest of the Rotorua central business district, and is considered as a suburb of Rotorua. It is part of the Rotorua functional urban area as defined by Statistics New Zealand. Ngongotahā has a population of 5,280 as of June 2025.

Its name is derived from a legend of Ihenga, the famous Māori explorer. It is said Īhenga met the Patu-paiarehe on Mount Ngongotahā and was offered a drink from a calabash. Ngongo means "to drink", and tahā means "calabash". Ngongotahā is often referred to by locals as the "Sunny side of the Mountain".

== Demographics ==
Stats NZ describes Ngongotahā as a small urban area, which covers 12.91 km^{2} (4.98 sq mi). It had an estimated population of 5,280 as of June 2025, with a population density of 409 people per km^{2}.

Historical population
Year	Pop.	±% p.a.
2006	4,062	—
2013	4,254	+0.66%
2018	4,869	+2.74%
2023	5,124	+1.03%

Ngongotahā had a population of 5,124 in the 2023 New Zealand census, an increase of 255 people (5.2%) since the 2018 census, and an increase of 870 people (20.5%) since the 2013 census. There were 2,481 males, 2,631 females, and 9 people of other genders in 1,857 dwellings. 2.9% of people identified as LGBTIQ+. The median age was 40.7 years (compared with 38.1 years nationally). There were 1,005 people (19.6%) aged under 15 years, 876 (17.1%) aged 15 to 29, 2,226 (43.4%) aged 30 to 64, and 1,014 (19.8%) aged 65 or older.

People could identify as more than one ethnicity. The results were 68.1% European (Pākehā); 43.7% Māori; 6.1% Pasifika; 5.6% Asian; 0.9% Middle Eastern, Latin American and African New Zealanders (MELAA); and 2.1% other, which includes people giving their ethnicity as "New Zealander". English was spoken by 96.8%, Māori by 13.9%, Samoan by 0.4%, and other languages by 6.4%. No language could be spoken by 2.2% (e.g. too young to talk). New Zealand Sign Language was known by 0.5%. The percentage of people born overseas was 14.2, compared with 28.8% nationally.

Religious affiliations were 29.5% Christian, 0.8% Hindu, 0.4% Islam, 2.6% Māori religious beliefs, 0.3% Buddhist, 0.6% New Age, and 1.5% other religions. People who answered that they had no religion were 56.2%, and 8.5% of people did not answer the census question.

Of those at least 15 years old, 738 (17.9%) people had a bachelor's or higher degree, 2,337 (56.7%) had a post-high school certificate or diploma, and 1,047 (25.4%) people exclusively held high school qualifications. The median income was $36,600, compared with $41,500 nationally. 285 people (6.9%) earned over $100,000 compared to 12.1% nationally. The employment status of those at least 15 was 2,001 (48.6%) full-time, 537 (13.0%) part-time, and 153 (3.7%) unemployed.

Individual statistical areas
Name	Area (km^{2})	Population	Density (per km^{2})	Dwellings	Median age	Median income
Ngongotahā East	2.87	1,980	690	681	41.7 years	$34,900
Ngongotahā West	1.44	1,671	1,160	603	37.9 years	$38,100
Ngongotahā South	8.59	1,476	172	573	42.5 years	$36,800
New Zealand					38.1 years	$41,500

== Marae ==
The Ngongotahā area has six marae:

- Te Awawherowhero Marae is affiliated with the Ngāti Whakaue hapū of Ngāti Rautao.
- Parawai Marae and its Whatumairangi meeting house are affiliated with the Ngāti Whakaue hapū of Ngāti Tuteaiti and Te Whatumairangi, and Te Ure o Uenukukōpako hapū of Ngāti Te Ngākau and Ngāti Tura.
- Tarimano Marae and Tawakeheimoa meeting house are affiliated with the Ngāti Rangiwewehi hapū of Ngāti Rangiwewehi ki Uta. In October 2020, the Government committed $4,525,104 from the Provincial Growth Fund to upgrade the marae and nine others, creating an estimated 34 jobs.
- Tārukenga Marae and Te Ngākau meeting house are affiliated with the Ngāti Whakaue hapū of Ngāti Te Ngakau and Ngāti Tura, and Te Ure o Uenukukōpako's hapū of Ngāti Te Ngākau and Ngāti Tura.
- Waikuta Marae and its Rangitunaeke meeting house are affiliated with the Ngāti Whakaue hapū of Ngāti Rangitunaeke.
- Waitetī or Weriweri Marae and its Ngāraranui meeting house are affiliated with the Ngāti Whakaue hapū of Ngāti Ngāraranui, and Te Ure o Uenukukōpako hapū of Ngāti Ngāraranui. In October 2020, the Government committed $372,420 from the Provincial Growth Fund to upgrade the marae, and create 20 jobs.

== Mount Ngongotahā ==
Mt Ngongotahā and Rotorua by Thomas Ryan (no date)

Mount Ngongotahā is a 757 metres (2,484 ft) high rhyolite dome. It sits to the south-west of Ngongotahā village. It has a gondola on the eastern slopes which takes visitors to a viewing platform, luge and restaurant.

The Mount Ngongotahā Jubilee Track provides a walking track to the summit, and passes through a scenic reserve. The first section of the track is through original native forest that has not been logged. One of the features is a rātā tree 40 metres (130 ft) tall, and 1.8 metres (5 ft 11 in) in girth. The original track was cut on Jubilee Day, marking 50 years since the arrival of Captain William Hobson at Waitangi.

Another visitor attraction on the slopes of Mount Ngongotahā is the Wingspan National Bird of Prey Centre. It is a captive breeding facility and visitor centre located in the Ngongotahā Valley. Wingspan undertakes conservation, education and research activities related to birds of prey found in New Zealand, and provides demonstrations of falconry.

== Recreation ==
The Ngongotahā Stream, which flows through the village centre and onward into Lake Rotorua, is one of the most heavily fished areas in New Zealand. Specimen rainbow trout and brown trout are regularly taken by fly fishermen. Other nearby streams (Awahou, Waiteti and Hamurana) also offer good fishing.

The village has strong football (Ngongotaha AFC), rugby league (Ngongotaha Sports & Community Association), rugby union, netball and touch teams.

== Transport ==
The main road through the village, known as SH 36, runs via Kaharoa and Pyes Pa to Tauranga.

The Rotorua Branch railway runs through Ngongotahā, although this has been unused since the turn of the century. A railway park, operated by a trust and run by volunteers, provides train rides on a scale model steam train and a mini diesel-locomotive on the western side of Ngongotahā near the former line.

== Education ==
Ngongotaha School is a co-educational state primary school for Year 1 to 6 students, with a roll of 388 as of July 2026. It opened in 1911.

== Notable people ==
Despite its small size, Ngongotahā has produced a number of famous New Zealanders, including:

- Temuera Morrison, actor
- Phillip Orchard, New Zealand international rugby league player (1960s–1970s)
- Robert Orchard, New Zealand international rugby league player (1960s–1970s)
- Jeremy Paul, Australian international rugby player, a 1999 World Cup winner
- Hika Reid, New Zealand international rugby union player 1980–1986
- Ron Russell, Canadian politician
