= Ngakuru =

Rural locality in Bay of Plenty Region, New Zealand

- Rural locality
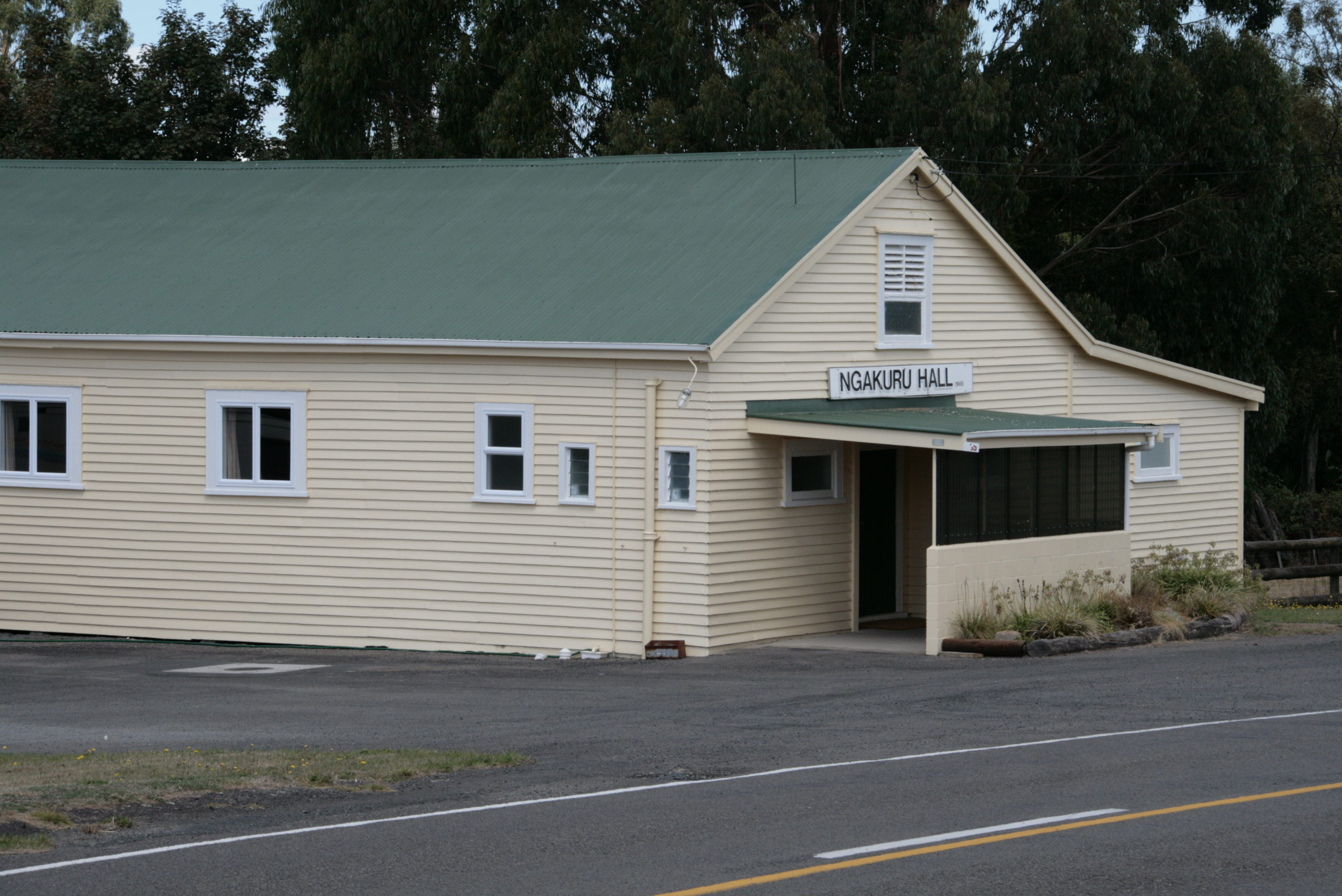
- Interactive map of Ngakuru
- Coordinates: 38.321355°S 176.192495°E
- Country: New Zealand
- Region: Waikato
- Territorial authority: Rotorua Lakes District
- Ward: Rotorua Rural General Ward
- Community: Rotorua Rural Community
- Electorates: Rotorua; Waiariki (Māori)

Government
  - Territorial authority: Rotorua Lakes Council
  - Regional council: Waikato Regional Council
  - Mayor of Rotorua: Tania Tapsell
  - Rotorua MP: Todd McClay
  - Waiariki MP: Rawiri Waititi

Area
  - Total: 42.23 km^{2} (16.31 sq mi)

Population (2023 Census)
  - Total: 321
  - Density: 7.60/km^{2} (19.7/sq mi)
- Postcode(s): 3077

Ngakuru is a rural community in Rotorua Lakes District within the Waikato region of New Zealand's North Island.

== Demographics ==
Ngakuru locality covers 42.23 km^{2} (16.31 sq mi). It is part of the Ngakuru statistical area.

Historical population for Ngakuru and surrounds
Year	Pop.	±% p.a.
2006	342	—
2013	336	−0.25%
2018	303	−2.05%
2023	321	+1.16%

Ngakuru had a population of 321 in the 2023 New Zealand census, an increase of 18 people (5.9%) since the 2018 census, and a decrease of 15 people (−4.5%) since the 2013 census. There were 165 males, 153 females, and 6 people of other genders in 120 dwellings. 0.9% of people identified as LGBTIQ+. There were 66 people (20.6%) aged under 15 years, 60 (18.7%) aged 15 to 29, 159 (49.5%) aged 30 to 64, and 36 (11.2%) aged 65 or older.

People could identify as more than one ethnicity. The results were 93.5% European (Pākehā), 20.6% Māori, 1.9% Pasifika, and 3.7% other, which includes people giving their ethnicity as "New Zealander". English was spoken by 99.1%, Māori by 0.9%, and other languages by 2.8%. No language could be spoken by 0.9% (e.g. too young to talk). New Zealand Sign Language was known by 0.9%. The percentage of people born overseas was 12.1, compared with 28.8% nationally.

Religious affiliations were 26.2% Christian, 0.9% New Age, and 1.9% other religions. People who answered that they had no religion were 63.6%, and 6.5% of people did not answer the census question.

Of those at least 15 years old, 51 (20.0%) people had a bachelor's or higher degree, 171 (67.1%) had a post-high school certificate or diploma, and 45 (17.6%) people exclusively held high school qualifications. 36 people (14.1%) earned over $100,000 compared to 12.1% nationally. The employment status of those at least 15 was 150 (58.8%) full-time, 39 (15.3%) part-time, and 3 (1.2%) unemployed.

=== Ngakuru statistical area ===
Ngakuru statistical area covers 446.44 km^{2} (172.37 sq mi) and had an estimated population of 1,960 as of June 2025, with a population density of 4.4 people per km^{2}.

Historical population for the Ngakuru statistical area
Year	Pop.	±% p.a.
2006	1,701	—
2013	1,695	−0.05%
2018	1,770	+0.87%
2023	1,878	+1.19%

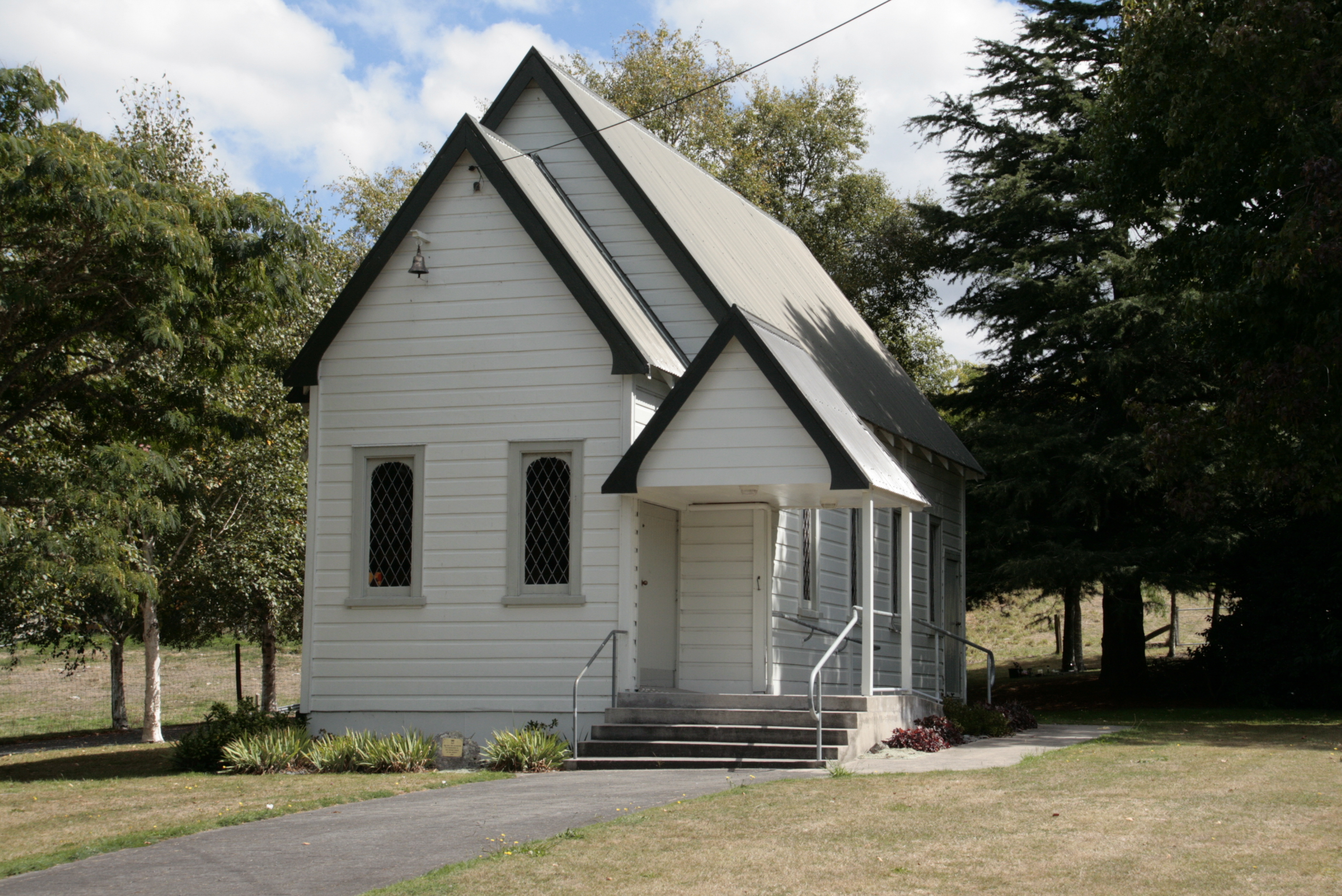
Ngakuru Community Christ Church

Ngakuru had a population of 1,878 in the 2023 New Zealand census, an increase of 108 people (6.1%) since the 2018 census, and an increase of 183 people (10.8%) since the 2013 census. There were 960 males, 909 females, and 6 people of other genders in 663 dwellings. 1.8% of people identified as LGBTIQ+. The median age was 36.9 years (compared with 38.1 years nationally). There were 429 people (22.8%) aged under 15 years, 330 (17.6%) aged 15 to 29, 882 (47.0%) aged 30 to 64, and 234 (12.5%) aged 65 or older.

People could identify as more than one ethnicity. The results were 86.7% European (Pākehā), 22.2% Māori, 1.9% Pasifika, 3.0% Asian, and 3.5% other, which includes people giving their ethnicity as "New Zealander". English was spoken by 96.8%, Māori by 4.3%, Samoan by 0.2%, and other languages by 4.5%. No language could be spoken by 2.4% (e.g. too young to talk). New Zealand Sign Language was known by 0.3%. The percentage of people born overseas was 14.5, compared with 28.8% nationally.

Religious affiliations were 27.6% Christian, 1.0% Māori religious beliefs, 0.3% Buddhist, 0.5% New Age, and 1.3% other religions. People who answered that they had no religion were 61.8%, and 7.3% of people did not answer the census question.

Of those at least 15 years old, 246 (17.0%) people had a bachelor's or higher degree, 909 (62.7%) had a post-high school certificate or diploma, and 297 (20.5%) people exclusively held high school qualifications. The median income was $49,700, compared with $41,500 nationally. 192 people (13.3%) earned over $100,000 compared to 12.1% nationally. The employment status of those at least 15 was 849 (58.6%) full-time, 243 (16.8%) part-time, and 21 (1.4%) unemployed.

== Education ==
Ngakuru School is a co-educational state primary school for Year 1 to 8 students, with a roll of 56 as of July 2026. The school was established in 1933.
