= Kaharoa =

Rural area in the Bay of Plenty, New Zealand

- Rural community
- Interactive map of Kaharoa
- Coordinates: 37.995359°S 176.236454°E
- Country: New Zealand
- Region: Bay of Plenty
- Territorial authority: Rotorua Lakes
- Ward: Rotorua Rural General Ward
- Community: Rotorua Rural Community
- Electorates: Rotorua; Waiariki (Māori)

Government
  - Territorial authority: Rotorua Lakes Council
  - Regional council: Bay of Plenty Regional Council
  - Mayor of Rotorua: Tania Tapsell
  - Rotorua MP: Todd McClay
  - Waiariki MP: Rawiri Waititi

Area
  - Total: 9.46 km^{2} (3.65 sq mi)

Population (2023 Census)
  - Total: 144
  - Density: 15.2/km^{2} (39.4/sq mi)
- Postcode(s): 3096

Kaharoa is a rural area of New Zealand approximately 20 kilometres (12 miles) from Rotorua and 45 km (28 mi) from Tauranga in the North Island. At its highest point the area is approx. 500 m (1,600 ft) above sea level, with some areas able to see towards the coastline of the eastern Bay of Plenty.

The New Zealand Ministry for Culture and Heritage gives a translation of "large net" for Kaharoa.

In the main the area is used for farming, formerly dry stock, but increasingly this is being converted to dairy. Some areas have been used for small blocks of forestry and there are areas of native bush, preserved to maintain and support the North Island kōkako, a native bird. Increasingly subdivision of land has taken place, with many former farms also being used as lifestyle blocks.

== Demographics ==
Kaharoa locality covers 9.46 km^{2} (3.65 sq mi). The locality is part of the Tui Ridge statistical area.

Historical population for Kaharoa and surrounds
Year	Pop.	±% p.a.
2006	126	—
2013	141	+1.62%
2018	147	+0.84%
2023	144	−0.41%

Kaharoa had a population of 144 in the 2023 New Zealand census, a decrease of 3 people (−2.0%) since the 2018 census, and an increase of 3 people (2.1%) since the 2013 census. There were 78 males and 72 females in 51 dwellings. 4.2% of people identified as LGBTIQ+. The median age was 49.9 years (compared with 38.1 years nationally). There were 21 people (14.6%) aged under 15 years, 27 (18.8%) aged 15 to 29, 69 (47.9%) aged 30 to 64, and 30 (20.8%) aged 65 or older.

People could identify as more than one ethnicity. The results were 89.6% European (Pākehā); 22.9% Māori; 2.1% Asian; 2.1% Middle Eastern, Latin American and African New Zealanders (MELAA); and 4.2% other, which includes people giving their ethnicity as "New Zealander". English was spoken by 97.9%, Māori by 6.2%, and other languages by 8.3%. No language could be spoken by 4.2% (e.g. too young to talk). The percentage of people born overseas was 12.5, compared with 28.8% nationally.

Religious affiliations were 29.2% Christian, 2.1% Māori religious beliefs, and 4.2% other religions. People who answered that they had no religion were 56.2%, and 12.5% of people did not answer the census question.

Of those at least 15 years old, 27 (22.0%) people had a bachelor's or higher degree, 63 (51.2%) had a post-high school certificate or diploma, and 30 (24.4%) people exclusively held high school qualifications. The median income was $48,900, compared with $41,500 nationally. 9 people (7.3%) earned over $100,000 compared to 12.1% nationally. The employment status of those at least 15 was 63 (51.2%) full-time, 15 (12.2%) part-time, and 3 (2.4%) unemployed.

=== Tui Ridge statistical area ===
Tui Ridge covers 220.92 km^{2} (85.30 sq mi) and had an estimated population of 1,880 as of June 2025, with a population density of 8.5 people per km^{2}.

Historical population for Tui Ridge
Year	Pop.	±% p.a.
2006	1,455	—
2013	1,521	+0.64%
2018	1,617	+1.23%
2023	1,803	+2.20%

Tui Ridge had a population of 1,803 in the 2023 New Zealand census, an increase of 186 people (11.5%) since the 2018 census, and an increase of 282 people (18.5%) since the 2013 census. There were 915 males and 888 females in 633 dwellings. 1.8% of people identified as LGBTIQ+. The median age was 43.0 years (compared with 38.1 years nationally). There were 348 people (19.3%) aged under 15 years, 291 (16.1%) aged 15 to 29, 855 (47.4%) aged 30 to 64, and 306 (17.0%) aged 65 or older.

People could identify as more than one ethnicity. The results were 87.9% European (Pākehā); 19.3% Māori; 1.8% Pasifika; 3.8% Asian; 0.7% Middle Eastern, Latin American and African New Zealanders (MELAA); and 3.3% other, which includes people giving their ethnicity as "New Zealander". English was spoken by 96.7%, Māori by 4.2%, Samoan by 0.2%, and other languages by 8.0%. No language could be spoken by 2.2% (e.g. too young to talk). New Zealand Sign Language was known by 0.3%. The percentage of people born overseas was 15.6, compared with 28.8% nationally.

Religious affiliations were 28.3% Christian, 0.3% Hindu, 0.2% Islam, 1.0% Māori religious beliefs, 0.7% Buddhist, and 1.3% other religions. People who answered that they had no religion were 61.2%, and 7.5% of people did not answer the census question.

Of those at least 15 years old, 300 (20.6%) people had a bachelor's or higher degree, 888 (61.0%) had a post-high school certificate or diploma, and 267 (18.4%) people exclusively held high school qualifications. The median income was $48,100, compared with $41,500 nationally. 189 people (13.0%) earned over $100,000 compared to 12.1% nationally. The employment status of those at least 15 was 795 (54.6%) full-time, 246 (16.9%) part-time, and 30 (2.1%) unemployed.

== Education ==
Kaharoa School is a co-educational state primary school for Year 1 to 8 students, with a roll of 176 as of July 2026. The school first opened in 1907.
