= Mamaku, New Zealand =

Rural settlement in Bay of Plenty Region, New Zealand

Mamaku
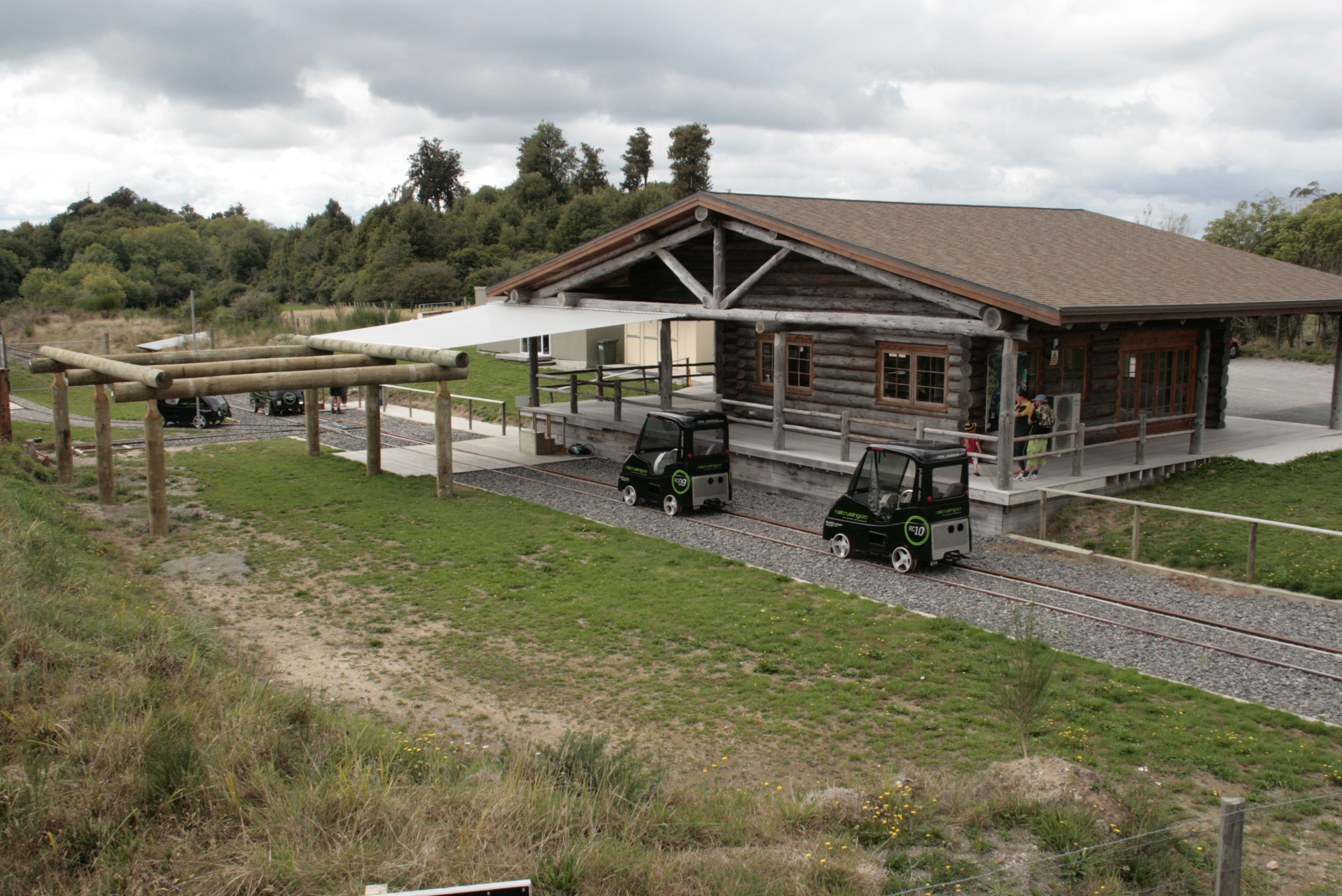
- Railhead station
- Interactive map of Mamaku
- Coordinates: 38°05′43″S 176°4′43″E
- Country: New Zealand
- Region: Bay of Plenty
- Local Authority: Rotorua Lakes District
- Ward: Rotorua Rural General Ward
- Community: Rotorua Rural Community
- Electorates: Rotorua; Waiariki (Māori)

Government
  - Territorial authority: Rotorua Lakes Council
  - Regional council: Bay of Plenty Regional Council
  - Mayor of Rotorua: Tania Tapsell
  - Rotorua MP: Todd McClay
  - Waiariki MP: Rawiri Waititi

Area
  - Total: 2.67 km^{2} (1.03 sq mi)

Population (June 2025)
  - Total: 830
  - Density: 310/km^{2} (810/sq mi)

Mamaku is a small village in the Bay of Plenty Region of the North Island of New Zealand. It lies on the Mamaku Plateau at an elevation of 560 metres (1,840 ft) above sea level. Situated at the highest point of the now-mothballed Rotorua Branch railway line, the town is 4 kilometres (2.5 mi) south of State Highway 5.

== History ==
Mamaku was originally called Kaponga, but the name was changed to Mamaku in 1890 to avoid confusion with the town of Kaponga in Taranaki. Ironically, the plant known as Mamaku, the Black tree fern, is not found in the area. European settlement commenced in the 1880s, and for a time Mamaku rivalled Rotorua for size.

The main industry in Mamaku was originally native timber logging. In the late 19th century and early 20th century Mamaku had, at one time, 5 timber mills, all logging native timber from the surrounding bush. This reduced over time and today there are no timber mills operating in the village, with the last mill ceasing operations on 31 March 2015.

Another major industry established in Mamaku was farming, primarily dairy and sheep. This continues today as perhaps the main source of income for the village. Some recent additions to local industry include blueberry winemaking and off-road biking.

== Demographics ==
Mamaku is described by Statistics New Zealand as a rural settlement, and covers 2.67 km^{2} (1.03 sq mi) and had an estimated population of 830 as of June 2025, with a population density of 311 people per km^{2}. Mamaku is part of the larger Ngongotahā Valley statistical area.

Historical population
Year	Pop.	±% p.a.
2006	726	—
2013	690	−0.72%
2018	837	+3.94%
2023	867	+0.71%

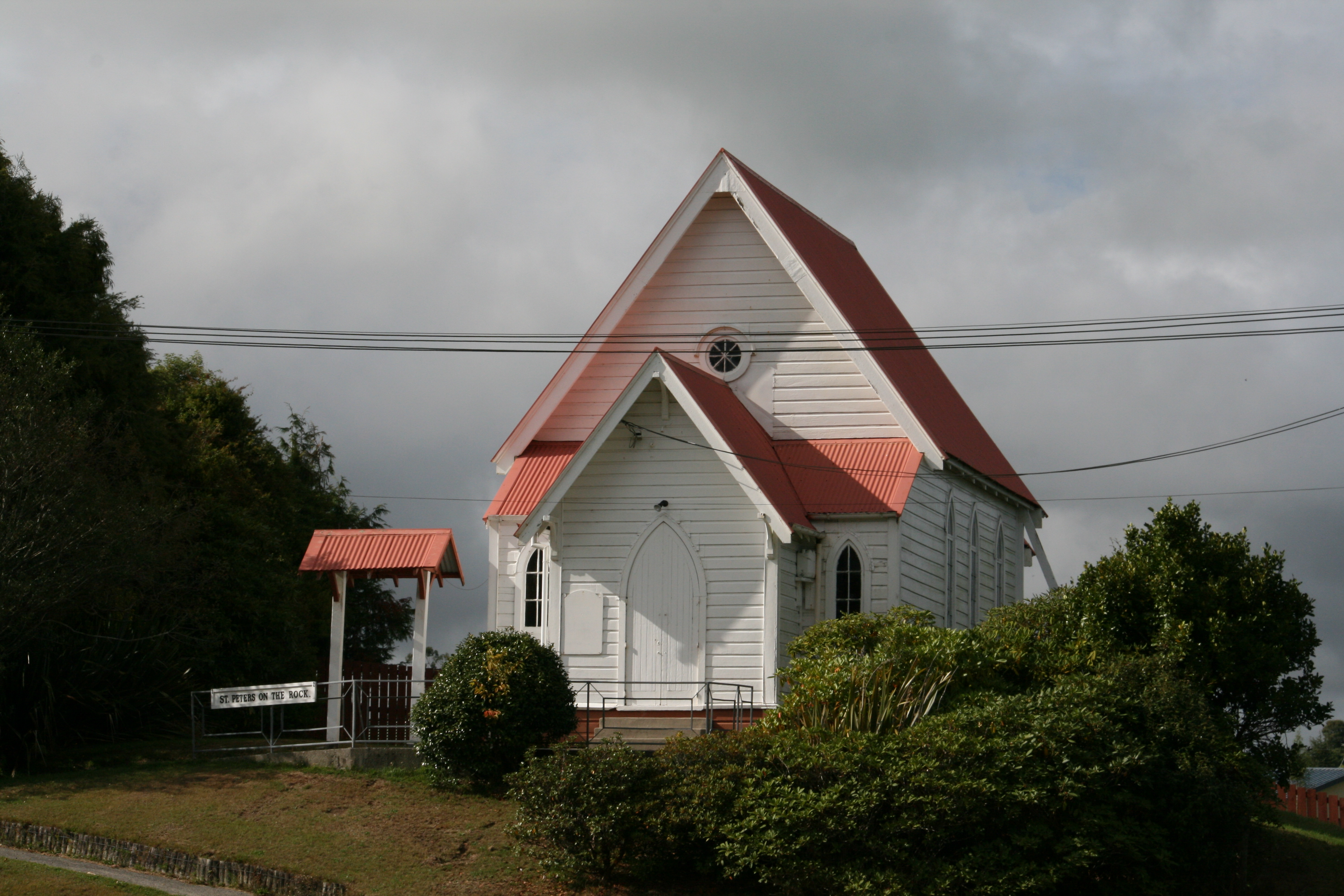
Mamaku Church

Mamaku had a population of 867 in the 2023 New Zealand census, an increase of 30 people (3.6%) since the 2018 census, and an increase of 177 people (25.7%) since the 2013 census. There were 417 males, 444 females, and 3 people of other genders in 300 dwellings. 2.1% of people identified as LGBTIQ+. The median age was 38.2 years (compared with 38.1 years nationally). There were 207 people (23.9%) aged under 15 years, 138 (15.9%) aged 15 to 29, 405 (46.7%) aged 30 to 64, and 117 (13.5%) aged 65 or older.

People could identify as more than one ethnicity. The results were 76.1% European (Pākehā); 37.7% Māori; 5.2% Pasifika; 3.1% Asian; 0.3% Middle Eastern, Latin American and African New Zealanders (MELAA); and 5.5% other, which includes people giving their ethnicity as "New Zealander". English was spoken by 98.3%, Māori by 9.7%, and other languages by 4.2%. No language could be spoken by 1.4% (e.g. too young to talk). New Zealand Sign Language was known by 0.3%. The percentage of people born overseas was 10.7, compared with 28.8% nationally.

Religious affiliations were 20.1% Christian, 1.4% Māori religious beliefs, 0.3% New Age, and 2.1% other religions. People who answered that they had no religion were 67.8%, and 8.0% of people did not answer the census question.

Of those at least 15 years old, 66 (10.0%) people had a bachelor's or higher degree, 408 (61.8%) had a post-high school certificate or diploma, and 183 (27.7%) people exclusively held high school qualifications. The median income was $37,000, compared with $41,500 nationally. 18 people (2.7%) earned over $100,000 compared to 12.1% nationally. The employment status of those at least 15 was 324 (49.1%) full-time, 78 (11.8%) part-time, and 36 (5.5%) unemployed.

== Education ==
Mamaku School is a co-educational state primary school for Year 1 to 8 students, with a roll of 91 as of July 2026.

The school opened in the village in 1895.
