= 2025 Rotorua Lakes Council election =

Elections in New Zealand

- 11 October 2025
- Turnout: 21,795 (43.52% ▼4.41 pp)
- Mayor
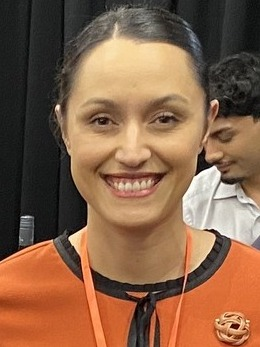
		Ind
Candidate	Tania Tapsell	Don Paterson
Party	Independent	Independent
Popular vote	12,380	2,952
Percentage	56.80%	13.54%
	Ind	Ind
Candidate	Robert Lee	Haehaetu Barrett
Party	Independent	Independent
Popular vote	2,822	2,752
Percentage	12.95%	12.63%
Mayor before election
Tania Tapsell
Independent
Elected mayor
Tania Tapsell
Independent
- Councillors
- 10 seats on the governing body of Rotorua Lakes Council; 6 seats needed for a majority
Party	Seats	+/–
Independent	9	0
Te Pāti Māori	1	+1
This lists parties that won seats. See the complete results below.

The 2025 Rotorua Lakes Council election was a local election held from 9 September to 11 October in the Rotorua Lakes District of New Zealand, as part of that year's territorial authority elections and other local elections held nation-wide.

Voters elected the mayor of Rotorua and 10 district councillors for the 2025–2028 term of the Rotorua Lakes Council. Postal voting and the first-past-the-post voting system were used.

Incumbent mayor Tania Tapsell was re-elected to a second term in a landslide.

The council introduced a Māori ward at the 2022 election; in a referendum on its future held at this election (as part of a nation-wide series of referendums) voters elected to keep the Māori ward.

== Key dates ==
- 4 July 2025: Nominations for candidates opened
- 1 August 2025: Nominations for candidates closed at 12 pm
- 9 September 2025: Voting documents were posted and voting opened
- 11 October 2025: Voting closed at 12 pm and progress/preliminary results published
- 16–19 October 2025: Final results declared.

== Background ==
=== Positions up for election ===
Voters in the district elected the mayor of Rotorua, 10 councillors from across 3 wards and members of the Rotorua Lakes and Rotorua Rural community boards. They also elected members of the Bay of Plenty Regional Council (Note: 1 member partially from the district in the Rotorua general constituency.; 1 member partially from the district in the Ōkurei Māori constituency.) and members of the Waikato Regional Council (Note: 1 member partially from the district in the Taupō-Rotorua constituency; 1 member partially from the district in the Ngā Tai ki Uta constituency.)

== List of candidates ==
=== Incumbents not seeking re-election ===
- Lani Kereopa, councillor for Te Ipu Wai Taketake Māori ward since 2022, and niece of councillor Trevor Maxwell

=== Mayor ===
Candidate	Photo	Affiliation (Note: A candidate may leave their affiliation blank, run as an independent, or run with an affiliation to an organisation, local body ticket or political party. Rotorua Lakes Council does not allow whānau, hapū, or iwi details to be used for the affiliation.)	Notes
Haehaetu Barrett		None	Former chief executive of Lifewise, a social services organisation
Takeina "Shakaina" Fraser		None	Also ran to be a councillor for the Te Ipu Wai Auraki general ward
Robert Lee		Independent	Incumbent councillor for the general ward. Also ran for re-election as a councillor.
Don Paterson		Saving Rotorua	Incumbent councillor. Also ran for re-election as a councillor in the Te Ipu Wai Auraki general ward.
Tania Tapsell		None	Incumbent mayor since 2022

=== Councillors ===
==== Te Ipu Wai Taketake Māori ward ====
Te Ipu Wai Taketake Māori ward returned three councillors to the district council.

Candidate	Affiliation	Notes
Trevor Horowaewae Maxwell	None	Incumbent councillor. Having been an elected councillor since 1977, he is New Zealand's longest-serving councillor.
Merepeka Raukawa-Tait	None	Former councillor
Harina Rinaha Rupapera	None	Scholar
Te Whatanui Skipwith	None	Former actor and advocate for the protection of Lake Rotokākahi
Te Rika Temara-Benfell	Te Pāti Māori	Community leader
Rawiri Waru	None	Incumbent councillor

==== Te Ipu Wai Auraki general ward ====
Te Ipu Wai Auraki general ward returned six councillors to the district council.

Candidate	Photo	Affiliation	Notes
Jared Adams		Independent	Former holiday park owner
Philly Angus		None	
Gregg Brown		None	Incumbent councillor. Brown had initially indicated that he would step down, but later changed his mind.
Jenny Chapman		None	Teacher and community advocate
Richard Collins		Think Positive	
Brendan Davis		Your Voice on Council	Previously ran for council in 2022
Mathew Doidge		None	Academic
Takeina "Shakaina" Fraser		None	Also ran for mayor
Frank "The Tank" Grapl		Revive and thrive Rotorua – Together	
Ryan Gray		Moving Rotorua Forward	Previously ran for council in 2022
Sandra Kai Fong		None	Incumbent deputy mayor
Robert Lee		Independent	Incumbent councillor. Also ran for mayor.
Reynold John Macpherson		Residents and Ratepayers	Former councillor (2019–2022) and mayoral candidate in 2022
Jason Monahan		None	Chef
Mariana Morrison		None	Former naval officer, The Bachelor New Zealand contestant and granddaughter of Howard Morrison.
Pam Neilson		None	
Conan O'Brien		Restore, Rebuild, and Reform	Incumbent councillor
Don Paterson		Saving Rotorua	Incumbent councillor. Also ran for mayor.
Neville Raethel		Keep New Zealand Beautiful	Local environment and anti-litter activist
Ben Sandford		None	Two-time winter Olympian. Stood for mayor of Rotorua in 2022
Rahul Sethi		None	Entrepreneur
Fisher Wang		Independent	Incumbent councillor

==== Rotorua Rural ward ====
The Rotorua Rural ward returned one councillor to the district council.

Candidate	Affiliation	Notes
Karen Barker	None	Incumbent councillor

As the only candidate, Barker was elected unopposed.

== Results ==
Overall turnout was 43.27%, with 21,796 voting papers returned, down from 47.9% in the 2022 election and short of the council's goal of at least 50% turnout. Rotorua ranked 51st for turnout out of the 66 district and city councils taking part in these elections.

With final results, the following candidates were declared elected:

=== Mayor ===
Incumbent mayor Tania Tapsell was re-elected to a second term in a landslide.

2025 Rotorua mayoral election
Party	Candidate	Votes	%	±%
Independent	Tania Tapsell^{†}	12,380	56.80	+25.66
Independent	Don Paterson	2,952	13.54	(new)
Independent	Robert Lee	2,822	12.95	(new)
Independent	Haehaetu Barrett	2,752	12.63	(new)
Independent	Takeina Fraser	468	2.15	(new)
Informal votes		35	0.16	+0.04
Blank votes		386	1.77	+0.90
Turnout		21,795	43.52	−4.41
Registered electors		50,082		
Independent hold				
^{†} incumbent

=== Council ===
==== Rural general ward ====
2025 Rural general ward election
Party	Candidate	Votes	%	±%
Independent	Karen Barker^{†}	elected unopposed		
Registered electors		4,600		
Independent hold				
^{†} incumbent

==== Te Ipu Wai Auraki general ward ====
2025 Te Ipu Wai Auraki general ward election
Party	Candidate	Votes	%	±%
Independent	Fisher Wang^{†}	7,199	48.87	+1.54
Independent	Sandra Kai Fong^{†}	6,915	46.94	−0.01
Independent	Ben Sandford	6,686	45.39	(new)
Independent	Gregg Brown^{†}	5,421	36.80	−2.80
Independent	Don Paterson^{†}	4,850	32.92	+2.81
Independent	Robert Lee^{†}	4,555	30.92	−1.40
Independent	Philly Angus	4,298	29.18	(new)
Independent	Conan O'Brien^{†}	4,282	29.07	−0.45
Independent	Ryan Gray	4,259	28.91	+1.41
Independent	Jenny Chapman	3,901	26.48	(new)
Residents & Ratepayers	Reynold MacPherson	3,851	26.14	(new)
Independent	Brendan Davis	3,379	22.94	−2.30
Independent	Jared Adams	2,246	15.25	(new)
Independent	Mathew Doidge	2,104	14.28	(new)
Independent	Pam Neilson	2,067	14.03	(new)
Independent	Mariana Morrison	1,995	13.54	(new)
Independent	Neville Raethel	1,715	11.64	(new)
Independent	Frank (The Tank) Grapl	1,356	9.21	(new)
Independent	Richard Collins	1,306	8.87	(new)
Independent	Rahul Sethi	1,257	8.53	(new)
Independent	Takeina Fraser	711	4.83	(new)
Independent	Jason Monahan	638	4.33	(new)
Informal votes		48	0.33	+0.15
Blank votes		133	0.90	−0.13
Turnout		14,731	45.93	−6.94
Registered electors		32,076		
Independent hold				
Independent hold				
Independent gain from Residents & Ratepayers				
Independent hold				
Independent hold				
Independent hold				
^{†} incumbent

==== Te Ipu Wai Taketake Māori ward ====
2025 Te Ipu Wai Taketake Māori ward election
Party	Candidate	Votes	%	±%
Te Pāti Māori	Te Rika Temara-Benfell	2,768	54.98	(new)
Independent	Trevor Horowaewae Maxwell^{†}	2,739	54.40	+7.29
Independent	Merepeka Raukawa-Tait	2,328	46.24	(new)
Independent	Rawiri Waru^{†}	2,266	45.00	+1.35
Independent	Harina Rinaha Rupapera	1,308	25.98	(new)
Independent	Te Whatanui Skipwith	1,284	25.50	(new)
Informal votes		1	0.02	+0.00
Blank votes		42	0.83	−4.09
Turnout		5,035	37.56	+4.62
Registered electors		13,406		
Te Pāti Māori gain from Independent				
Independent hold				
Independent gain from Independent				
^{†} incumbent

=== Māori Ward Poll ===
Choice	Votes	%
I vote to keep the Māori ward	11,363	57.19
I vote to remove the Māori ward	8,507	42.81
Total	19,870	100.00
Valid votes	19,870	91.17
Invalid/blank votes	1,925	8.83
Total votes	21,795	100.00
