= Kaingaroa, Bay of Plenty =

Town in Bay of Plenty Region, New Zealand

Kaingaroa
- Town
- Interactive map of Kaingaroa
- Coordinates: 38.408°S 176.565°E
- Country: New Zealand
- Region: Bay of Plenty
- Territorial authority: Rotorua Lakes District
- Ward: Rotorua Rural General Ward
- Community: Rotorua Rural Community
- Electorates: Rotorua; Waiariki (Māori)

Government
  - Territorial authority: Rotorua Lakes Council
  - Regional council: Bay of Plenty Regional Council
  - Mayor of Rotorua: Tania Tapsell
  - Rotorua MP: Todd McClay
  - Waiariki MP: Rawiri Waititi

Area
  - Total: 11.29 km^{2} (4.36 sq mi)

Population (June 2025)
  - Total: 420
  - Density: 37/km^{2} (96/sq mi)
- Postcode(s): 3073

Kaingaroa, also called Kaingaroa Village or Kaingaroa Forest (not to be confused with the actual forest), is a small town southeast of Rotorua within the Bay of Plenty region of New Zealand's North Island. The town is the headquarters of Kaingaroa Forest.

== Demographics ==
Kaingaroa is described by Statistics New Zealand as a rural settlement, and covers 11.29 km^{2} (4.36 sq mi). It had an estimated population of 420 as of June 2025, with a population density of 37 people per km^{2}. Kaingaroa is part of the larger Kaingaroa-Whakarewarewa statistical area.

Historical population for Kaingaroa
Year	Pop.	±% p.a.
2006	483	—
2013	426	−1.78%
2018	402	−1.15%
2023	414	+0.59%

Kaingaroa had a population of 414 in the 2023 New Zealand census, an increase of 12 people (3.0%) since the 2018 census, and a decrease of 12 people (−2.8%) since the 2013 census. There were 216 males, 198 females, and 3 people of other genders in 138 dwellings. 1.4% of people identified as LGBTIQ+. The median age was 34.6 years (compared with 38.1 years nationally). There were 84 people (20.3%) aged under 15 years, 99 (23.9%) aged 15 to 29, 186 (44.9%) aged 30 to 64, and 45 (10.9%) aged 65 or older.

People could identify as more than one ethnicity. The results were 27.5% European (Pākehā), 88.4% Māori, 5.1% Pasifika, and 2.2% Asian. English was spoken by 97.8%, Māori by 24.6%, Samoan by 0.7%, and other languages by 0.7%. No language could be spoken by 0.7% (e.g. too young to talk). New Zealand Sign Language was known by 0.7%. The percentage of people born overseas was 3.6, compared with 28.8% nationally.

Religious affiliations were 21.0% Christian, 1.4% Hindu, 12.3% Māori religious beliefs, and 0.7% New Age. People who answered that they had no religion were 52.2%, and 13.8% of people did not answer the census question.

Of those at least 15 years old, 12 (3.6%) people had a bachelor's or higher degree, 168 (50.9%) had a post-high school certificate or diploma, and 147 (44.5%) people exclusively held high school qualifications. The median income was $25,600, compared with $41,500 nationally. 6 people (1.8%) earned over $100,000 compared to 12.1% nationally. The employment status of those at least 15 was 117 (35.5%) full-time, 42 (12.7%) part-time, and 30 (9.1%) unemployed.

=== Kaingaroa-Whakarewarewa statistical area ===
Kaingaroa-Whakarewarewa statistical area, which also includes Lake Ōkareka and Lake Tarawera, covers 465.82 km^{2} (179.85 sq mi) and had an estimated population of 1,910 as of June 2025, with a population density of 4.1 people per km^{2}.

Historical population for Kaingaroa-Whakarewarewa
Year	Pop.	±% p.a.
2006	1,902	—
2013	1,881	−0.16%
2018	1,887	+0.06%
2023	1,875	−0.13%

Kaingaroa-Whakarewarewa had a population of 1,875 in the 2023 New Zealand census, a decrease of 12 people (−0.6%) since the 2018 census, and a decrease of 6 people (−0.3%) since the 2013 census. There were 969 males, 903 females, and 3 people of other genders in 747 dwellings. 1.8% of people identified as LGBTIQ+. The median age was 44.3 years (compared with 38.1 years nationally). There were 348 people (18.6%) aged under 15 years, 306 (16.3%) aged 15 to 29, 921 (49.1%) aged 30 to 64, and 303 (16.2%) aged 65 or older.

People could identify as more than one ethnicity. The results were 75.2% European (Pākehā); 37.1% Māori; 1.9% Pasifika; 3.0% Asian; 0.2% Middle Eastern, Latin American and African New Zealanders (MELAA); and 2.7% other, which includes people giving their ethnicity as "New Zealander". English was spoken by 98.2%, Māori by 10.1%, Samoan by 0.2%, and other languages by 6.4%. No language could be spoken by 1.1% (e.g. too young to talk). New Zealand Sign Language was known by 0.6%. The percentage of people born overseas was 14.6, compared with 28.8% nationally.

Religious affiliations were 28.2% Christian, 0.3% Hindu, 3.7% Māori religious beliefs, 0.2% Buddhist, 0.3% New Age, 0.2% Jewish, and 0.8% other religions. People who answered that they had no religion were 57.3%, and 9.8% of people did not answer the census question.

Of those at least 15 years old, 381 (25.0%) people had a bachelor's or higher degree, 804 (52.7%) had a post-high school certificate or diploma, and 339 (22.2%) people exclusively held high school qualifications. The median income was $43,000, compared with $41,500 nationally. 228 people (14.9%) earned over $100,000 compared to 12.1% nationally. The employment status of those at least 15 was 777 (50.9%) full-time, 246 (16.1%) part-time, and 51 (3.3%) unemployed.

== Marae ==
Te Huingawaka Marae is local meeting ground for the Tūhoe hapū of Ngāti Kaingaroa and Nga Tipuna O Te Motu. The marae building is a former cookhouse.

In October 2020, the Government committed $461,159 from the Provincial Growth Fund to upgrade the marae, creating 8 jobs.

== Education ==
Kaingaroa Forest School is a co-educational state primary school for Year 1 to 8 students living in the forest area, with a roll of 25 as of July 2026. The school opened in 1948.

== Climate ==
Climate data for Kaingaroa Village, elevation 544 m (1,785 ft), (1981–2010 normals, extremes 1951–1999)
Month	Jan	Feb	Mar	Apr	May	Jun	Jul	Aug	Sep	Oct	Nov	Dec	Year
Record high °C (°F)	31.7 (89.1)	30.7 (87.3)	29.0 (84.2)	26.2 (79.2)	23.7 (74.7)	18.3 (64.9)	17.8 (64.0)	17.8 (64.0)	23.4 (74.1)	26.7 (80.1)	28.0 (82.4)	29.4 (84.9)	31.7 (89.1)
Mean maximum °C (°F)	27.1 (80.8)	26.4 (79.5)	23.4 (74.1)	20.1 (68.2)	17.6 (63.7)	14.7 (58.5)	13.3 (55.9)	14.3 (57.7)	16.6 (61.9)	20.0 (68.0)	23.2 (73.8)	25.0 (77.0)	27.8 (82.0)
Mean daily maximum °C (°F)	21.6 (70.9)	21.6 (70.9)	19.6 (67.3)	16.5 (61.7)	13.3 (55.9)	10.9 (51.6)	10.3 (50.5)	11.2 (52.2)	13.5 (56.3)	15.5 (59.9)	18.0 (64.4)	20.1 (68.2)	16.0 (60.8)
Daily mean °C (°F)	16.1 (61.0)	16.3 (61.3)	14.1 (57.4)	11.1 (52.0)	8.4 (47.1)	6.4 (43.5)	5.7 (42.3)	6.5 (43.7)	8.4 (47.1)	10.4 (50.7)	12.4 (54.3)	14.8 (58.6)	10.9 (51.6)
Mean daily minimum °C (°F)	10.5 (50.9)	10.9 (51.6)	8.5 (47.3)	5.7 (42.3)	3.6 (38.5)	2.0 (35.6)	1.1 (34.0)	1.7 (35.1)	3.3 (37.9)	5.4 (41.7)	6.9 (44.4)	9.5 (49.1)	5.8 (42.4)
Mean minimum °C (°F)	3.3 (37.9)	3.9 (39.0)	−0.1 (31.8)	−2.1 (28.2)	−3.3 (26.1)	−4.6 (23.7)	−4.9 (23.2)	−4.7 (23.5)	−3.2 (26.2)	−0.8 (30.6)	0.6 (33.1)	2.8 (37.0)	−5.8 (21.6)
Record low °C (°F)	0.2 (32.4)	0.8 (33.4)	−6.0 (21.2)	−4.8 (23.4)	−7.0 (19.4)	−7.7 (18.1)	−9.4 (15.1)	−7.3 (18.9)	−5.6 (21.9)	−5.8 (21.6)	−1.9 (28.6)	−0.8 (30.6)	−9.4 (15.1)
Average rainfall mm (inches)	90.6 (3.57)	91.2 (3.59)	119.3 (4.70)	136.9 (5.39)	113.5 (4.47)	148.8 (5.86)	142.2 (5.60)	109.8 (4.32)	139.3 (5.48)	109.7 (4.32)	94.5 (3.72)	119.7 (4.71)	1,415.5 (55.73)
Source: NIWA (rain 1991–2020)
