= Ngongotahā Valley =

Rural locality in Bay of Plenty Region, New Zealand

- Rural locality
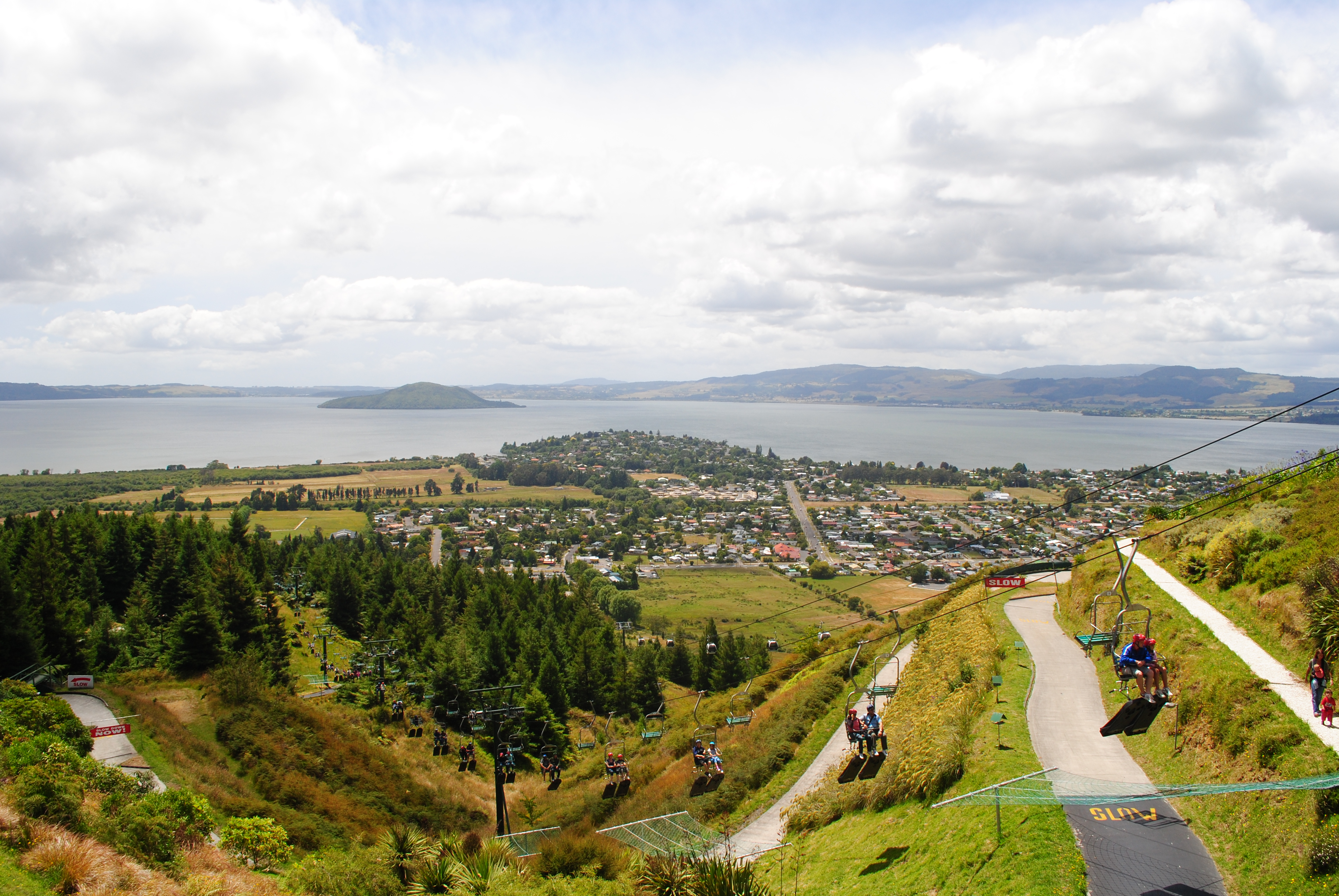
- Chairlifts and gondolas ascending Mount Ngongotahā
- Interactive map of Ngongotahā Valley
- Coordinates: 38.123°S 176.145°E
- Country: New Zealand
- Region: Bay of Plenty
- Territorial authority: Rotorua Lakes District
- Ward: Rotorua Rural General Ward
- Community: Rotorua Rural Community
- Electorates: Rotorua; Waiariki (Māori)

Government
  - Territorial authority: Rotorua Lakes Council
  - Regional council: Bay of Plenty Regional Council
  - Mayor of Rotorua: Tania Tapsell
  - Rotorua MP: Todd McClay
  - Waiariki MP: Rawiri Waititi

Area
  - Total: 177.50 km^{2} (68.53 sq mi)

Population (June 2025)
  - Total: 1,750
  - Density: 9.86/km^{2} (25.5/sq mi)
- Postcode(s): 3072

Ngongotahā Valley is a valley formed by the Ngongotahā Stream west of Rotorua, in New Zealand. Springs on the stream were landscaped in 1939 and promoted as Paradise Valley Springs, and the main road into the valley is Paradise Valley Road.

Mount Ngongotahā has a peak at 757 metres. A gondola / luge ride operates on the side of the mountain. The springs are still operating, and now include a wildlife park. Another visitor attraction on the slopes of Mount Ngongotahā is the Wingspan National Bird of Prey Centre. It is a captive breeding facility and visitor centre located in the Ngongotahā Valley. Wingspan undertakes conservation, education and research activities related to birds of prey found in New Zealand, and provides demonstrations of falconry.

The stream is prone to flooding but a joint project by the Bay of Plenty Regional Council and Rotorua Lakes Council to reduce the risk of future floods is ongoing.

== Demographics ==
Ngongotahā Valley statistical area, which also includes Mamaku, covers 177.50 km^{2} (68.53 sq mi) and had an estimated population of 1,750 as of June 2025, with a population density of 9.9 people per km^{2}.

Historical population
Year	Pop.	±% p.a.
2006	1,464	—
2013	1,410	−0.54%
2018	1,590	+2.43%
2023	1,692	+1.25%

Ngongotahā Valley had a population of 1,692 in the 2023 New Zealand census, an increase of 102 people (6.4%) since the 2018 census, and an increase of 282 people (20.0%) since the 2013 census. There were 861 males, 822 females, and 6 people of other genders in 591 dwellings. 2.3% of people identified as LGBTIQ+. The median age was 39.1 years (compared with 38.1 years nationally). There were 363 people (21.5%) aged under 15 years, 294 (17.4%) aged 15 to 29, 783 (46.3%) aged 30 to 64, and 252 (14.9%) aged 65 or older.

People could identify as more than one ethnicity. The results were 77.7% European (Pākehā); 35.5% Māori; 4.4% Pasifika; 3.5% Asian; 0.4% Middle Eastern, Latin American and African New Zealanders (MELAA); and 4.4% other, which includes people giving their ethnicity as "New Zealander". English was spoken by 97.9%, Māori by 8.7%, and other languages by 5.0%. No language could be spoken by 1.6% (e.g. too young to talk). New Zealand Sign Language was known by 0.4%. The percentage of people born overseas was 12.1, compared with 28.8% nationally.

Religious affiliations were 24.1% Christian, 0.5% Islam, 2.1% Māori religious beliefs, 0.4% Buddhist, 0.2% New Age, and 1.6% other religions. People who answered that they had no religion were 64.2%, and 7.3% of people did not answer the census question.

Of those at least 15 years old, 171 (12.9%) people had a bachelor's or higher degree, 804 (60.5%) had a post-high school certificate or diploma, and 348 (26.2%) people exclusively held high school qualifications. The median income was $38,100, compared with $41,500 nationally. 90 people (6.8%) earned over $100,000 compared to 12.1% nationally. The employment status of those at least 15 was 666 (50.1%) full-time, 195 (14.7%) part-time, and 51 (3.8%) unemployed.
