= Alayna =

Alayna is a female given name. It may refer to:

- Alayna, Producer of the Bobby Bones Show
- Alayna, Chinese manufacturer of replacement toothbrush heads
- Alayna Burns (born 1980), Australian cyclist
- Alayna Ng, Royal New Zealand Ballet dancer
- Alayna Snell, (born 1961) American fencer
- Alayna (singer), New Zealand singer-songwriter
- Talaʽ al-Badru ʽAlayna, traditional Islamic poem

== See also ==
- Aleyna (name)
