= Hamurana =

Rural locality in Bay of Plenty Region, New Zealand

- Rural locality
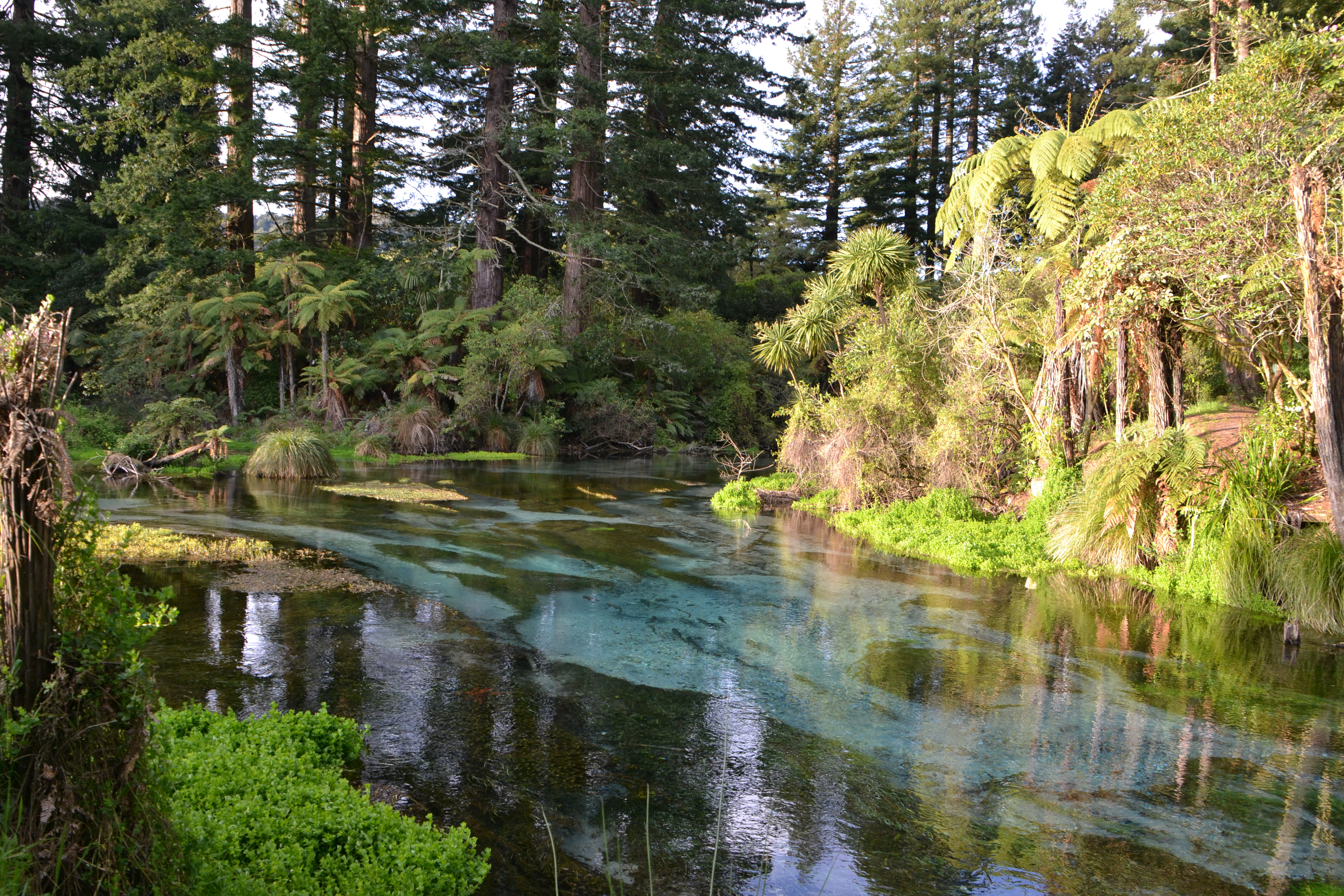
- The Hamurana stream in the Hamurana Springs Recreation Reserve
- Interactive map of Hamurana
- Coordinates: 38.0308°S 176.2550°E
- Country: New Zealand
- Region: Bay of Plenty
- Territorial authority: Rotorua Lakes District
- Ward: Te Ipu Wai Auraki General Ward
- Electorates: Rotorua; Waiariki (Māori)

Government
  - Territorial authority: Rotorua Lakes Council
  - Regional council: Bay of Plenty Regional Council
  - Mayor of Rotorua: Tania Tapsell
  - Rotorua MP: Todd McClay
  - Waiariki MP: Rawiri Waititi

Area
  - Total: 8.35 km^{2} (3.22 sq mi)

Population (June 2025)
  - Total: 1,180
  - Density: 141/km^{2} (366/sq mi)
- Postcode(s): 3097

Hamurana is a settlement and area of natural springs on the northern side of Lake Rotorua, in Rotorua Lakes within the Bay of Plenty Region of New Zealand's North Island. It includes the deepest natural spring on the North Island, emerging from a rocky area within the Hamurana Springs Recreation Reserve.

== Demographics ==
Hamurana covers 8.35 km^{2} (3.22 sq mi) and had an estimated population of 1,180 as of June 2025, with a population density of 141 people per km^{2}.

Historical population
Year	Pop.	±% p.a.
2006	963	—
2013	1,005	+0.61%
2018	1,032	+0.53%
2023	1,167	+2.49%

Hamurana had a population of 1,167 in the 2023 New Zealand census, an increase of 135 people (13.1%) since the 2018 census, and an increase of 162 people (16.1%) since the 2013 census. There were 585 males and 582 females in 438 dwellings. 2.3% of people identified as LGBTIQ+. The median age was 49.5 years (compared with 38.1 years nationally). There were 198 people (17.0%) aged under 15 years, 162 (13.9%) aged 15 to 29, 579 (49.6%) aged 30 to 64, and 228 (19.5%) aged 65 or older.

People could identify as more than one ethnicity. The results were 85.3% European (Pākehā); 24.7% Māori; 2.3% Pasifika; 4.6% Asian; 0.5% Middle Eastern, Latin American and African New Zealanders (MELAA); and 3.9% other, which includes people giving their ethnicity as "New Zealander". English was spoken by 98.5%, Māori by 5.9%, and other languages by 9.0%. No language could be spoken by 1.5% (e.g. too young to talk). New Zealand Sign Language was known by 0.5%. The percentage of people born overseas was 19.5, compared with 28.8% nationally.

Religious affiliations were 27.2% Christian, 0.3% Islam, 1.0% Māori religious beliefs, 0.3% Buddhist, 0.3% New Age, and 1.5% other religions. People who answered that they had no religion were 59.1%, and 10.5% of people did not answer the census question.

Of those at least 15 years old, 255 (26.3%) people had a bachelor's or higher degree, 525 (54.2%) had a post-high school certificate or diploma, and 195 (20.1%) people exclusively held high school qualifications. The median income was $44,400, compared with $41,500 nationally. 144 people (14.9%) earned over $100,000 compared to 12.1% nationally. The employment status of those at least 15 was 498 (51.4%) full-time, 156 (16.1%) part-time, and 15 (1.5%) unemployed.

== Hamurana Springs ==
The Hamurana Springs are a collection of springs on the site, officially named Hamurana Springs Recreation Reserve since 1971.

=== Hangarua Spring ===
The main spring is 920 feet (280 m) above sea level and is approximately 15 metres (50 ft) deep. It produces an estimated 4 million litres of crystal clear water per hour at a fairly constant temperature of 10 degrees Celsius. The rock surrounding this spring is volcanic (rhyolitic). The spring water travels down from the Mamaku Plateau through underground aquifers, taking 70 years to get here.

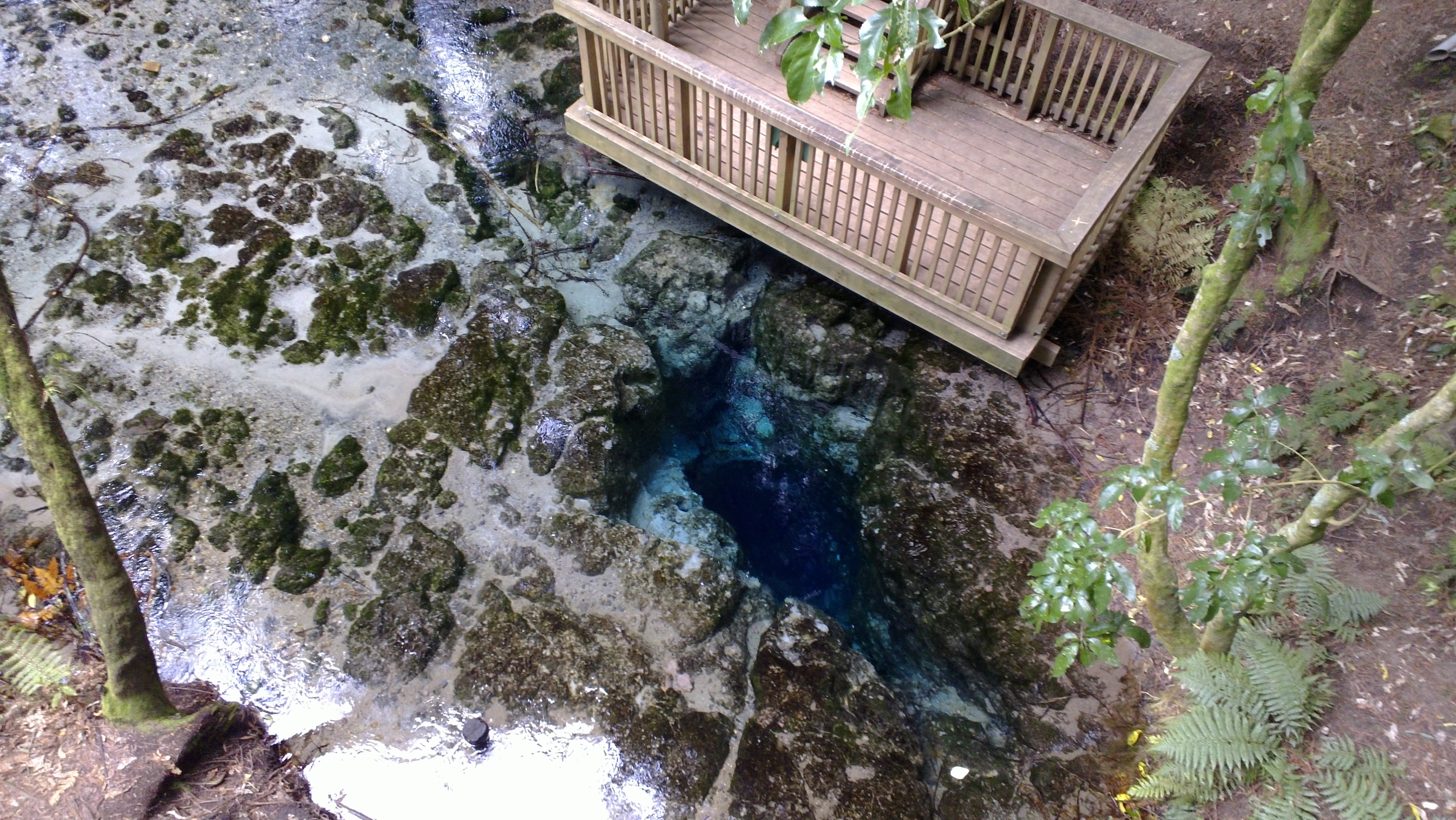
View on the Hangarua Spring from the top level viewing platform, in Hamurana Springs Recreation Reserve, Rotorua, NZ.

=== Dancing Sands Spring ===
Another identified spring in the reserve is the Dancing Sands spring, named because of the effect of the emerging water on the sand on the bottom of the spring.

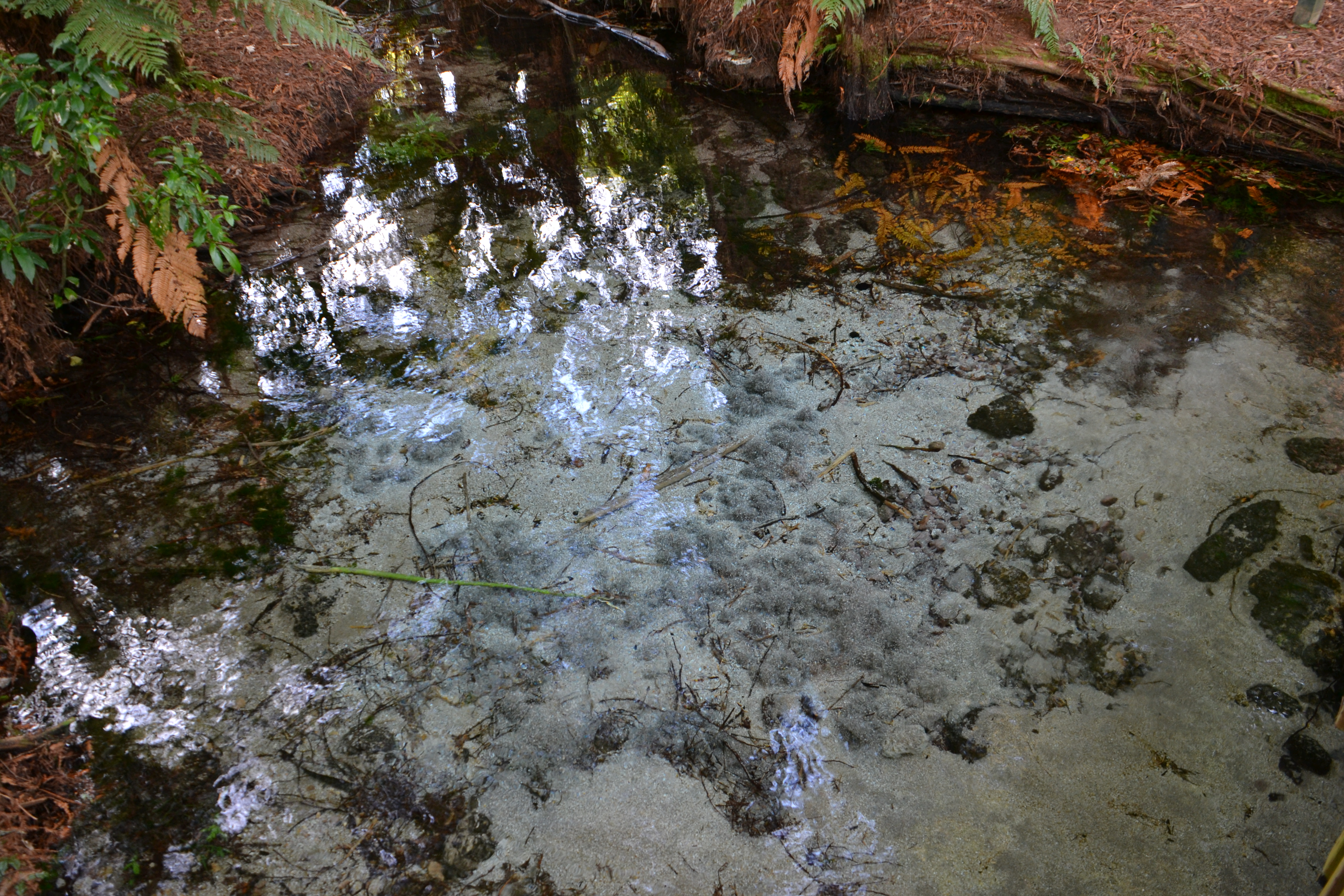
The Dancing Sands spring in the Hamurana Springs Recreation Reserve, Rotorua, NZ.

=== Hamurana Stream ===
The spring flows as a stream for approximately one kilometre in the Hamurana Springs Recreation Reserve through a patch of redwoods forest before joining Lake Rotorua. In summer the stream is home to rainbow trout who prefer the cooler temperature of the spring water.

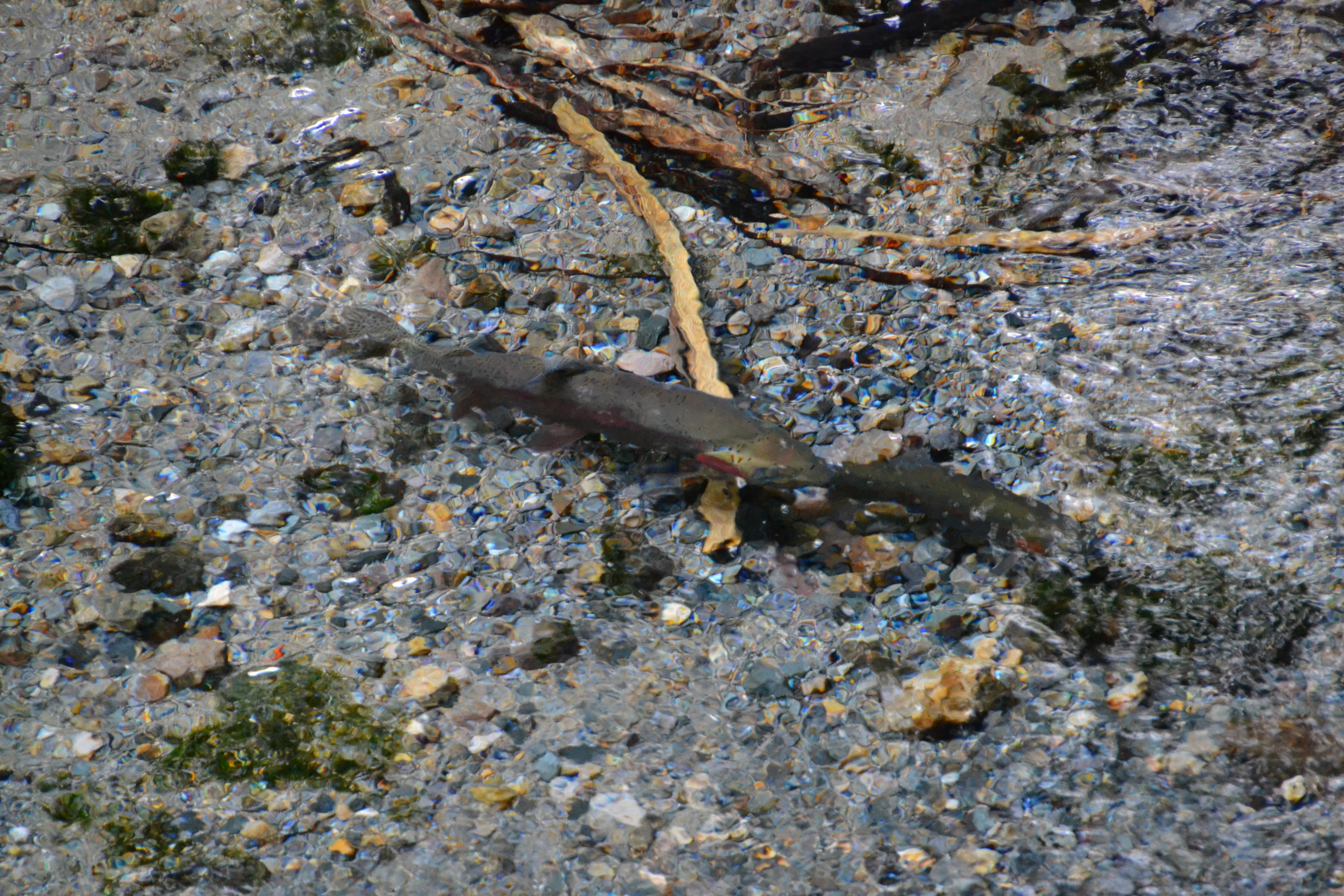
Trout close to the Hangarua Spring in the Hamurana Springs Recreation Reserve.

=== Ownership ===
Ownership of the springs and other nearby sites of cultural significance was returned to the Ngāti Rangiwewehi iwi under the Ngāti Rangiwewehi Claims Settlement Bill 2014. The Act also declares the Hamurana Springs A and Hamurana Springs B as reserves subject to sections 17 and 18 respectively of the Reserves Act 1977.

Access for the public to the springs and reserve maintained by the Department of Conservation was historically free, however, access is now fully enclosed and only paid access is available as of 2018.
