= Ben Sandford =

New Zealand skeleton racer

Ben Sandford OLY
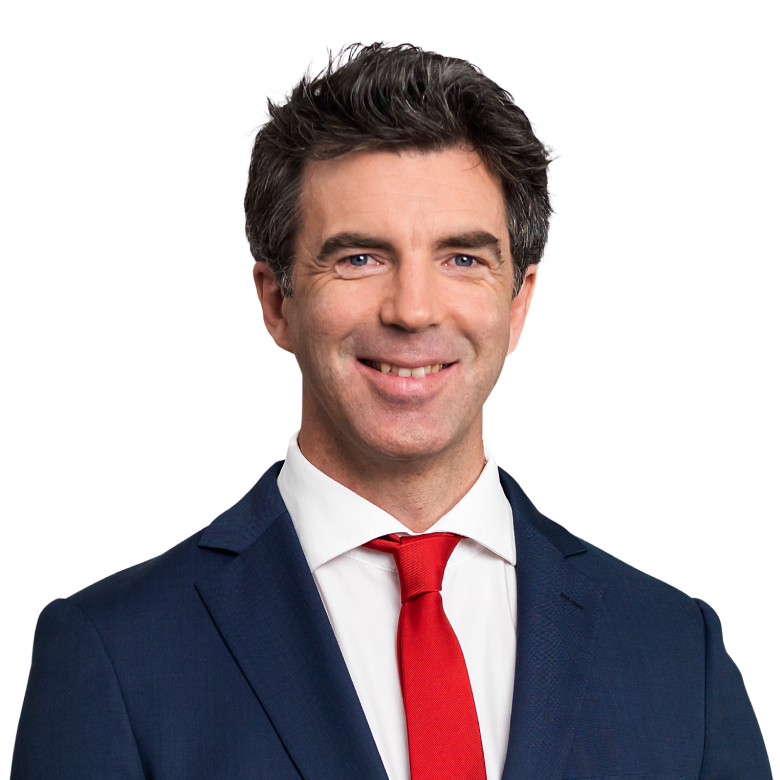

Personal information
- Born: 12 March 1979 (age 47) Rotorua, New Zealand
Medal record
Men's skeleton
Representing New Zealand
World Championships
Bronze medal – third place	2012 Lake Placid	Men

Ben Sandford (born 12 March 1979 in Rotorua) is a New Zealand skeleton racer who has competed since 2002. He finished tenth in the men's skeleton event at the 2006 Winter Olympics in Turin. He finished 11th at the 2010 Winter Olympics.

== Early life ==
Sandford was born and raised in Rotorua, attending Rotorua Boys' High School. He later attended the Victoria University of Wellington, where he graduated with bachelor's degrees in law and geography in 2002.

== Sport career ==
Sandford's best finish at the FIBT World Championships was 3rd in the men's skeleton event at Lake Placid in 2012. With his bronze medal, Ben became the second person from the Southern Hemisphere to medal at the FIBT World Championships, after his uncle Bruce Sandford who won gold in the same event in 1992 in Calgary.

Due to his natural sporting talent, Sandford's introduction to Skeleton came after he led a Squash team representing Victoria University to an International University Squash Tournament held in Austria in 2002. The skeleton track was close to the host centre and Ben thought he would "give it a go."

He has served as an athlete representative to the New Zealand Olympic Committee since 2008 and the World Anti-Doping Agency since 2012. At the 2014 Congress of the Federation Internationale de Bobsleigh et de Tobogganing Sandford was elected as the federation's vice president for Legal Affairs, becoming the first person from Oceania to be elected to the FIBT's executive committee.

== Political career ==
Sandford was the New Zealand Labour Party's candidate for Rotorua at the 2017 general election. Sandford was also ranked 57 on Labour's party list for the election. Sanford came second place to National Party Member of Parliament Todd McClay, who won by a margin of 10,887 votes.

In July 2022, Sandford announced he would contest the 2022 Rotorua mayoral election. He came second to Tania Tapsell, losing by a margin of almost 3,300 votes.

On 24 February 2023, it was announced that Sandford would contest Rotorua for Labour again in the 2023 general election. Sandford came second place to the incumbent McClay, who won by a margin of 8,923 votes.

== Other sources ==
- 2006 men's skeleton results (todor66.com)
- Ben Sanford at the International Bobsleigh and Skeleton Federation
