= Alayna (singer) =

Singer-songwriter

- Born: Alayna Powley; 1993 (age 32–33); Hamurana, Rotorua, New Zealand
- Genres: R&B, Soul, Folk
- Occupations: Singer, songwriter
- Instruments: Vocals, guitar
- Years active: 2017–present
- Labels: 20XX, Nettwerk Music Group

Alayna Powley (born 1993), known mononymously as Alayna, is a singer-songwriter from New Zealand. In 2013, her YouTube cover of Sam Smith's "Nirvana" gained attention online. She has collaborated with producers Finneas O'Connell and Stint.

== Life and career ==
=== Early life and education ===
Alayna was born in 1993 and raised in Hamurana, Rotorua, New Zealand. Both her parents are teachers. She is one of three children. Growing up, her father, who was in an Irish band, played guitar and taught her songs. She started singing at the age of six and recorded a CD for her grandparents. She attended Kaharoa School and Western Heights High School, and holds a Bachelor of Musical Arts from the Music and Audio Institute of New Zealand (MAINZ).

=== 2013–2016: Early career ===
Alayna began making music in high school and wrote her first song, "Threads", at age fifteen. She placed in the 'Play it Strange' songwriting competition twice, which led to professional recording time. In 2013, her YouTube cover of Sam Smith’s "Nirvana" received attention online.

After graduation, Alayna moved to New York to pursue music while working in restaurants. Her first upload to SoundCloud, "Bliss", led to a contract with the independent Vancouver label 20XX. The label introduced her to producers such as Stint, who she collaborated with on the official release of "Bliss", and Finneas O'Connell, who produced "Between Dusk and Dawn" on her debut EP.

=== 2017–2019: Debut releases with 20XX ===
After her US study visa expired, Alayna returned to New Zealand and travelled regularly between there and the United States. In 2017, she released her debut single, "Falling Autumn", produced by Astronomyy. The song received airplay on BBC Radio 1 and attracted interest from labels including Sony Music and Universal Music Group. Her debut EP, Sweet Soul, was released on 28 August 2018. Her tracks were also included on official Spotify playlists.

=== 2020–2024: Self Portrait of a Woman Unravelling ===
In 2020, Alayna signed with the Canadian label Nettwerk Music Group and released her second EP, Tender. She then began work on her debut album, Self Portrait of a Woman Unravelling, which was released on 7 July 2023. The album features a stripped-back sound, differing from the R&B and soul style of her earlier releases. Following the release, Alayna performed at Auckland's Big Fan Studios and at Rotorua's Level 13 in July 2023.

In 2024, her song "A World Without You", written about a family member's illness, was nominated for an APRA Silver Scroll Award.

Alayna supported Georgia Lines in Auckland in September 2024.

=== 2025–present: Set Her Free ===
Alayna announced that her sophomore album, Set Her Free, would be released on 13 February 2026. The lead single, "Softly", addresses her relationships with women.

== Discography ==
=== Albums ===
List of albums, with selected details
Title	Details
Self Portrait of a Woman Unravelling	Released: 7 July 2023; Label: Nettwerk
Set Her Free	Released: 13 February 2026; Label: Nettwerk

=== Extended plays ===
List of EPs, with selected details
Title	Details
Sweet Soul	Released: August 2018; Label: 20XX
Live at Roundhead Studios, Auckland, NZ	Released: January 2019; Label: Alayna Music
Tender	Released: July 2020; Label: Nettwerk
