= Aleyna (name) =

Aleyna is a feminine Turkish given name. Notable people with the name include:

- Aleyna Ertürk (born 2005), Turkish fencer
- Aleyna FitzGerald (born 1999), Australian model
- Aleyna Özkan (born 2002), Turkish swimmer
- Aleyna Solaker (born 1996), Turkish actress
- Aleyna Tilki (born 2000), Turkish singer

== See also ==
- Alayna (disambiguation)
