= Aratiatia Power Station =

Dam on the North Island of New Zealand

Aratiatia
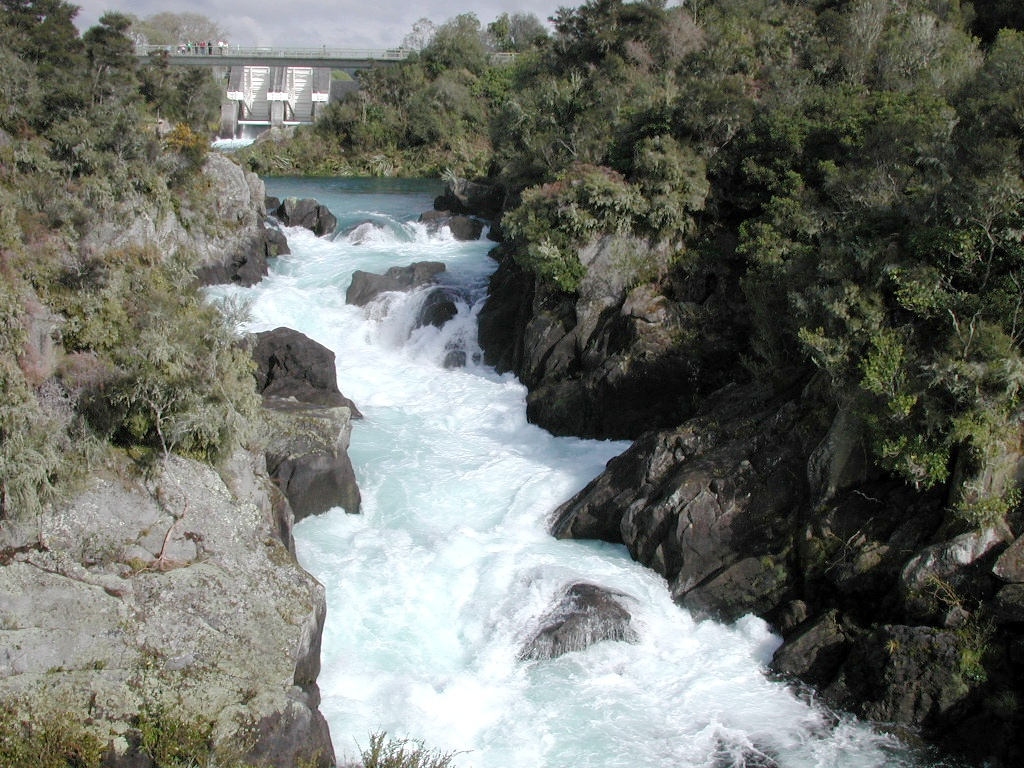
- Aratiatia Rapids with opened spill gates
- Interactive map of Aratiatia
- Country: New Zealand
- Location: near Taupō
- Coordinates: 38°36′57″S 176°8′33″E
- Status: Operational
- Opening date: 1964
- Owner: Mercury Energy

Dam and spillways
- Impounds: Waikato River

Reservoir
- Surface area: 55 ha (140-acre)

Power Station
- Operator: Mercury Energy
- Type: Run-of-the-river
- Turbines: 3× Francis
- Installed capacity: 78 MW (105,000 hp)
- Annual generation: 331 GWh (1,190 TJ)

Aratiatia Power Station is a hydroelectric power station on the Waikato River, in the North Island of New Zealand. It is the first hydroelectric power station on the Waikato River, and is located 13 kilometres (8.1 mi) downstream of Lake Taupō. Aratiatia is owned and operated by Mercury Energy.

Aratiatia is a largely run-of-the-river station, as it generates electricity from water from the Lake Taupō control gates and to the Ōhakuri Power Station. It does, however, have a 55-hectare (140-acre) lake behind the station for temporary storage.

The New Zealand Ministry for Culture and Heritage gives a translation of "pegged ladder" for Aratiatia.

== Aratiatia Rapids ==
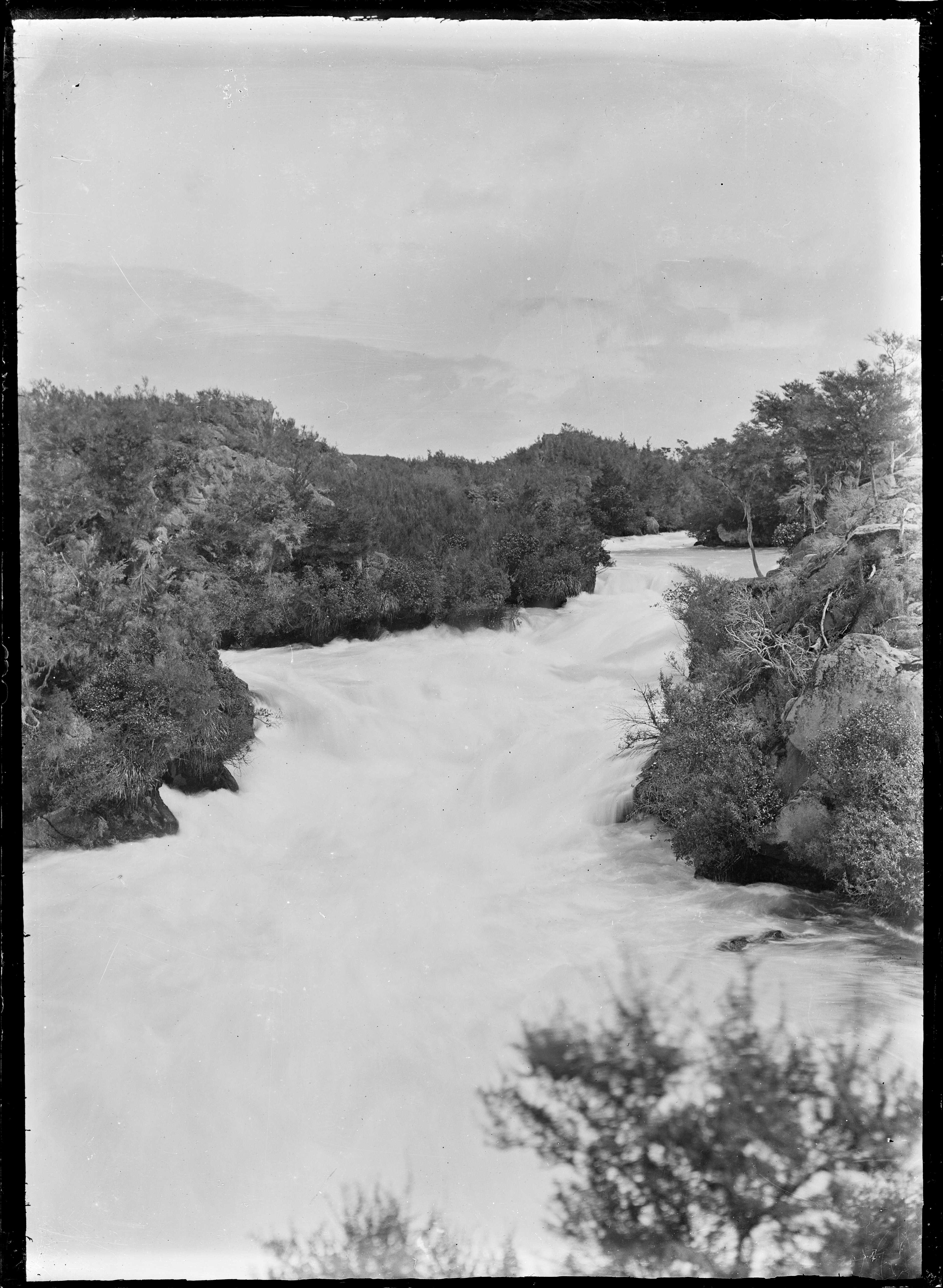
View of Aratiatia Rapids in 1928

Before construction of the dam and hydro station, the Aratiatia Rapids were a prominent feature on the Waikato River; a scenic reserve from 1906. The dam construction meant that no water flowed over the rapids. However, several times a day, the Aratiatia dam gates of the Waikato River are opened, which restores the rapids to their normal operation. There are several public lookout points on the high rock bluffs that dominate this turbulent stretch of Aratiatia Rapids.

== See also ==
- Electricity sector in New Zealand
- Hydroelectric power in New Zealand
