= 2022 Rotorua mayoral election =

Election in New Zealand

← 2019	8 October 2022	2025 →
- Turnout: 23,302
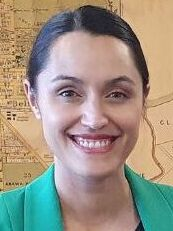

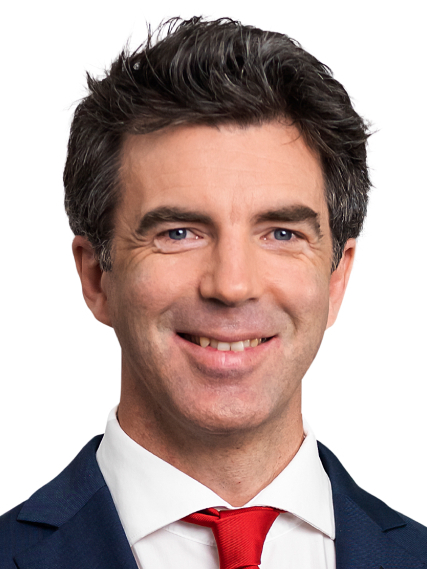

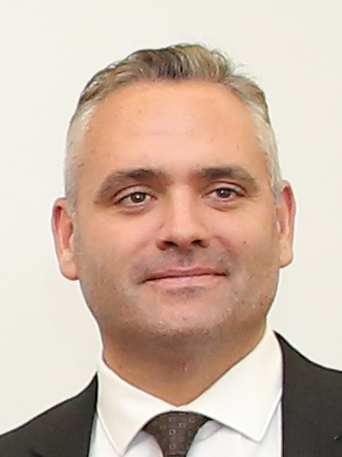
Candidate	Tania Tapsell	Ben Sandford	Fletcher Tabuteau
Party	Independent	Independent	Independent
Popular vote	7,362	4,070	4,043
Percentage	31.59	17.46	17.35
Mayor before election
Steve Chadwick
Elected mayor
Tania Tapsell

The 2022 Rotorua mayoral election took place on 8 October 2022 to determine the Mayor of Rotorua. Incumbent mayor Steve Chadwick did not run for re-election.

== Candidates ==
=== Declared candidates ===
- Kalaadevi Ananda, businesswoman
- Raj Kumar, district councillor
- Reynold Macpherson, district councillor
- Ben Sandford, lawyer, former winter Olympian, and Labour candidate in the 2017 general election
- Fletcher Tabuteau, former New Zealand First MP
- Tania Tapsell, district councillor and National candidate in the 2020 general election.

=== Declined to be candidates ===
- Steve Chadwick, incumbent mayor
- Dave Donaldson, deputy mayor
- Todd McClay, National MP
- Merepeka Raukawa-Tait, district councillor
- Mercia Yates, district councillor

== Results ==
2022 Rotorua mayoral election
Party	Candidate	Votes	%	±%
Independent	Tania Tapsell	7,362	31.59	
Independent	Ben Sandford	4,070	17.46	
Independent	Fletcher Tabuteau	4,043	17.35	
Independent	Raj Kumar	3,600	15.44	
Residents & Ratepayers	Reynold Macpherson	3,561	15.28	
Independent	Rania Sears	377	1.61	
Independent	Kalaadevi Ananda	289	1.24	
Informal votes		29	0.14	
Majority		3,292	14.13	
Turnout		23,302		
Registered electors				
