= Merepeka Raukawa-Tait =

New Zealand politician and former chief executive

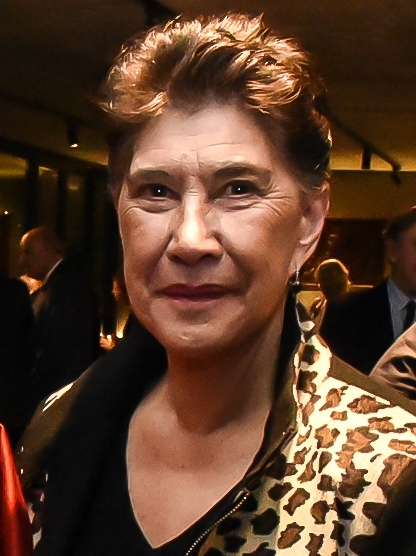
- Raukawa-Tait in 2019

Merepeka Raukawa-Tait is a New Zealand politician and former chief executive of the Women's Refuge organisation of New Zealand. She was a councilor at large for the Rotorua District Council from 2011 to 2022. She previously stood as a candidate for Parliament, serving briefly as deputy leader of the small Christian Heritage Party.

== Early life ==
Raukawa-Tait was born in Feilding, New Zealand and raised a Catholic. She has worked in a number of jobs, both in New Zealand and in Zurich, Switzerland. In the early 1990s she was in business in Rotorua and was a member of the Bay of Plenty Regional Council for one term.

Her most well-known role was as chief executive of Women's Refuge, an organisation that supports women who suffer domestic violence. She was a contentious chief executive bringing embarrassment to the organisation after attending the premiere of a strip club in central Wellington causing staff to lose faith in her judgment

== Political career ==
=== Local government candidacies ===
In 2001, she made a high-profile bid for the mayoralty of Wellington; however, after a weak performance at a candidates' meeting and a perceived failure to articulate policies and vision for the city, her support tapered off and she eventually placed sixth.

In 2003 Raukawa-Tait stood as a District Council candidate in a controversial and unsuccessful by-election campaign for the Masterton District Council. She finished last. She left Masterton after her election defeat.

=== Christian Heritage Party ===
Shortly before the 2002 elections, it was announced that Raukawa-Tait would be standing as a candidate for the Christian Heritage Party. This surprised many commentators, as Raukawa-Tait's previous comments did not indicate a great affinity with Christian Heritage policies – in particular, she was considered to be markedly more tolerant of homosexuality than the party. As a personal recruit of then party leader Graham Capill, Raukawa-Tait was immediately elected deputy leader of the party.

In the election itself, Raukawa-Tait contested the Wairarapa electorate against Labour's Georgina Beyer. Raukawa-Tait eventually placed third, winning 19% of the vote. This was the best result achieved by any Christian Heritage candidate in that election. Not long after the election, however, Raukawa-Tait and Capill entered into a dispute about the election campaign. Her campaign manager, Adam Owens, alleged that Capill's management of the party's campaign was poor, with little strategy and poor advertising. Owens alleged that the party was being financially mismanaged by Capill, and that he was not a "proper person" to lead a political party. After a protracted dispute, Raukawa-Tait and the entire Wairarapa Electorate Committee resigned from the party, citing "the lack of financial accountability" and "un-Christian threats and intimidation". In 2003 she reconciled with Capill, and they gave joint interviews in national newspapers saying that their falling out had been the fault of Adam Owens, and they jointly condemned him.

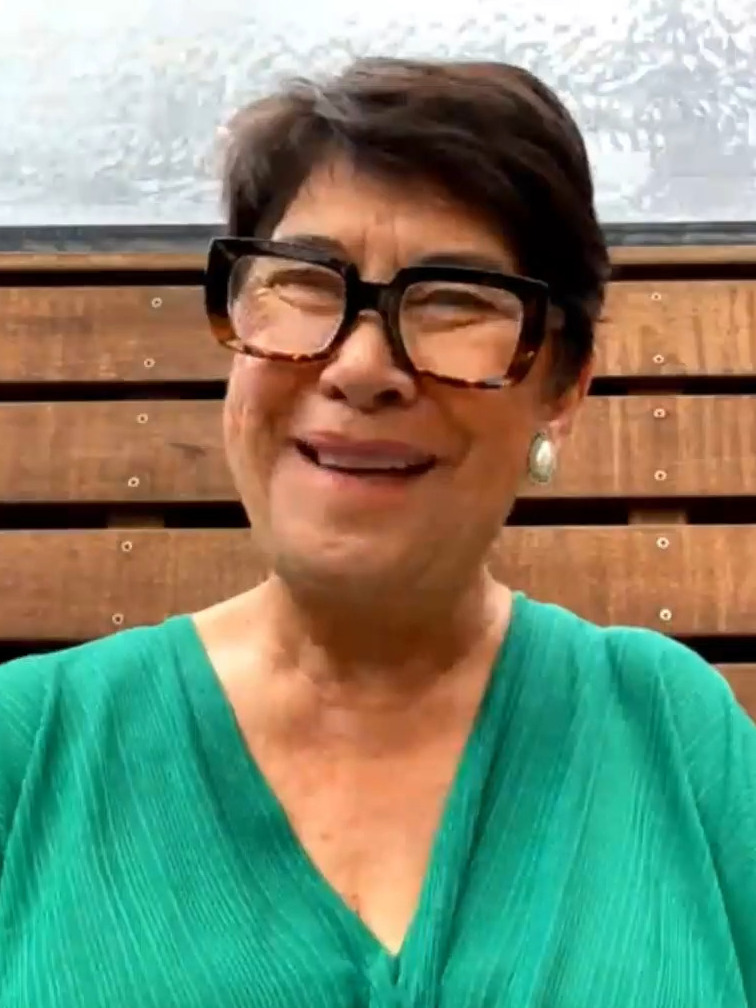
Raukara-Tait in 2022

=== Rotorua District Council, 2011–2022 ===
Merepeka Raukawa-Tait was elected to the Rotorua District Council in 2011. In 2013 Merepeka was re-elected to the Rotorua District Council.

Raukawa-Tait is again standing to be a councillor for the Te Ipu Wai Taketake Māori ward in the 2025 elections.

=== Te Pāti Māori candidacy ===
In the 2020 election, Raukawa-Tait stood for the Māori Party on its list in position 9.

In the 2023 election, Raukawa-Tait contested the Rotorua electorate for the party, which had since been renamed to Te Pāti Māori. On the party's list, she was ranked number 8. During the 2023 election, Raukawa Tait came third place in Rotorua, gaining 2,731 votes.

== Life outside politics ==
She worked as CEO of the West Auckland Hospice for a time, and she works as a speaker and consultant and has appeared from time to time as a panellist on the television advice show How's Life. She lives in Rotorua, works as a celebrity speaker.

In 1993 she was convicted in the Rotorua District Court, under her previous name Merepeka Sims, for failing to pay her employees' PAYE tax to the Inland Revenue, a serious offence under New Zealand law, because she said she needed the money for her businesses.
