= Rotorua Lakes District =

- District
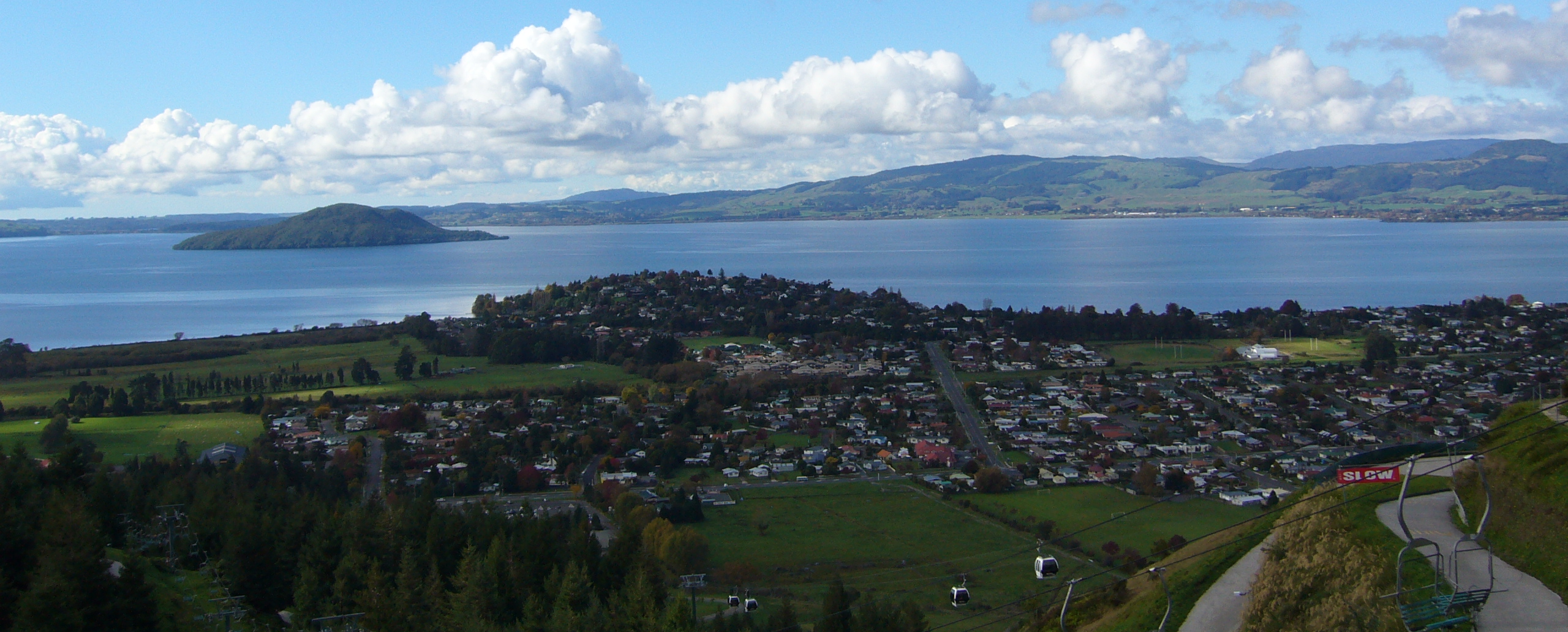

- Rotorua district within the North Island
- Coordinates: 38°13′48″S 176°16′41″E
- Country: New Zealand
- Regions: Bay of Plenty (majority); Waikato (part)
- Wards: Rotorua Rural; Te Ipu Wai Auraki; Te Ipu Wai Taketake (Māori)
- Main town and settlements: Rotorua, Hamurana, Mamaku

Government
  - Mayor: Tania Tapsell
  - Parliamentary electorate: Rotorua
  - Territorial authority: Rotorua Lakes Council

Area
  - Land: 2,409.31 km^{2} (930.24 sq mi)

Population (June 2025)
  - Total: 78,000
  - Density: 32/km^{2} (84/sq mi)
- Time zone: UTC+12 (NZST)
  - Summer (DST): UTC+13 (NZDT)
- Postcode(s): Map of postcodes
- Area code: 07
- Website: www.rotorualakescouncil.nz

Rotorua Lakes District or Rotorua District is a territorial authority district in the North Island of New Zealand. It has one urban area of significant size, the city of Rotorua. The district is governed by Rotorua Lakes Council, which is headquartered in Rotorua and is headed by a mayor. The district falls within two regional council areas, with the majority of the area and Rotorua city in the Bay of Plenty Region and the rest in the Waikato region. Tania Tapsell has been the mayor of Rotorua since the 2022 local elections.

== History ==
Rotorua has an unusual history, as the town was built by the Government as a tourist destination in the 1880s. Through the Rotorua Borough Act 1922, which achieved royal assent on 28 September 1922, the Rotorua Borough was formed. The inaugural elections for mayor were held in February 1923 and Cecil Clinkard was successful. In 1962, Rotorua was proclaimed a city. In 1979, the status was changed to a district when Rotorua City and Rotorua County amalgamated. The district council held its first meeting on 2 April 1979. At the 27 November 2014 council meeting, it was decided to change the operating name of the council to Rotorua Lakes Council, while the official name would remain unchanged. Since then, the district has been known as Rotorua Lakes and the council's web domain changed from www.rdc.govt.nz to rotorualakescouncil.nz.

== Geography ==
Rotorua Lakes covers 2,409 square kilometres (930 sq mi). The district's area is 61.52% in the Bay of Plenty region and 38.48% in the Waikato region. Adjacent districts (in a clockwise direction starting in the north) are Western Bay of Plenty, Whakatāne, Taupō, and South Waikato.

The Bay of Plenty portion of the district includes the settlements of Rotorua, Mamaku, Hamurana, Mourea, Rotoiti Forest, Lake Rotoma, Lake Okareka, Lake Tarawera, Rerewhakaaitu, and Kaingaroa Forest. The Waikato portion includes the settlements of Waiotapu, Reporoa, Broadlands, Mihi, Waikite Valley, Ngakuru, and Ātiamuri.

== Demographics ==
Rotorua District covers 2,409.31 km^{2} (930.24 sq mi) and had an estimated population of 78,000 as of June 2025, with a population density of 32 people per km^{2}.

Historical population
Year	Pop.	±% p.a.
2006	65,901	—
2013	65,280	−0.14%
2018	71,877	+1.94%
2023	74,058	+0.60%

Rotorua District had a population of 74,058 in the 2023 New Zealand census, an increase of 2,181 people (3.0%) since the 2018 census, and an increase of 8,778 people (13.4%) since the 2013 census. There were 36,336 males, 37,491 females and 234 people of other genders in 25,905 dwellings. 2.6% of people identified as LGBTIQ+. The median age was 36.6 years (compared with 38.1 years nationally). There were 16,053 people (21.7%) aged under 15 years, 14,076 (19.0%) aged 15 to 29, 32,358 (43.7%) aged 30 to 64, and 11,571 (15.6%) aged 65 or older.

People could identify as more than one ethnicity. The results were 61.6% European (Pākehā); 43.5% Māori; 6.4% Pasifika; 10.1% Asian; 0.7% Middle Eastern, Latin American and African New Zealanders (MELAA); and 2.0% other, which includes people giving their ethnicity as "New Zealander". English was spoken by 96.0%, Māori language by 13.6%, Samoan by 0.4% and other languages by 9.8%. No language could be spoken by 2.2% (e.g. too young to talk). New Zealand Sign Language was known by 0.6%. The percentage of people born overseas was 17.9, compared with 28.8% nationally.

Religious affiliations were 30.9% Christian, 1.7% Hindu, 0.3% Islam, 3.6% Māori religious beliefs, 0.7% Buddhist, 0.4% New Age, 0.1% Jewish, and 1.8% other religions. People who answered that they had no religion were 53.3%, and 7.5% of people did not answer the census question.

Of those at least 15 years old, 8,565 (14.8%) people had a bachelor's or higher degree, 32,001 (55.2%) had a post-high school certificate or diploma, and 14,844 (25.6%) people exclusively held high school qualifications. The median income was $39,000, compared with $41,500 nationally. 4,803 people (8.3%) earned over $100,000 compared to 12.1% nationally. The employment status of those at least 15 was that 29,181 (50.3%) people were employed full-time, 7,746 (13.4%) were part-time, and 2,526 (4.4%) were unemployed.

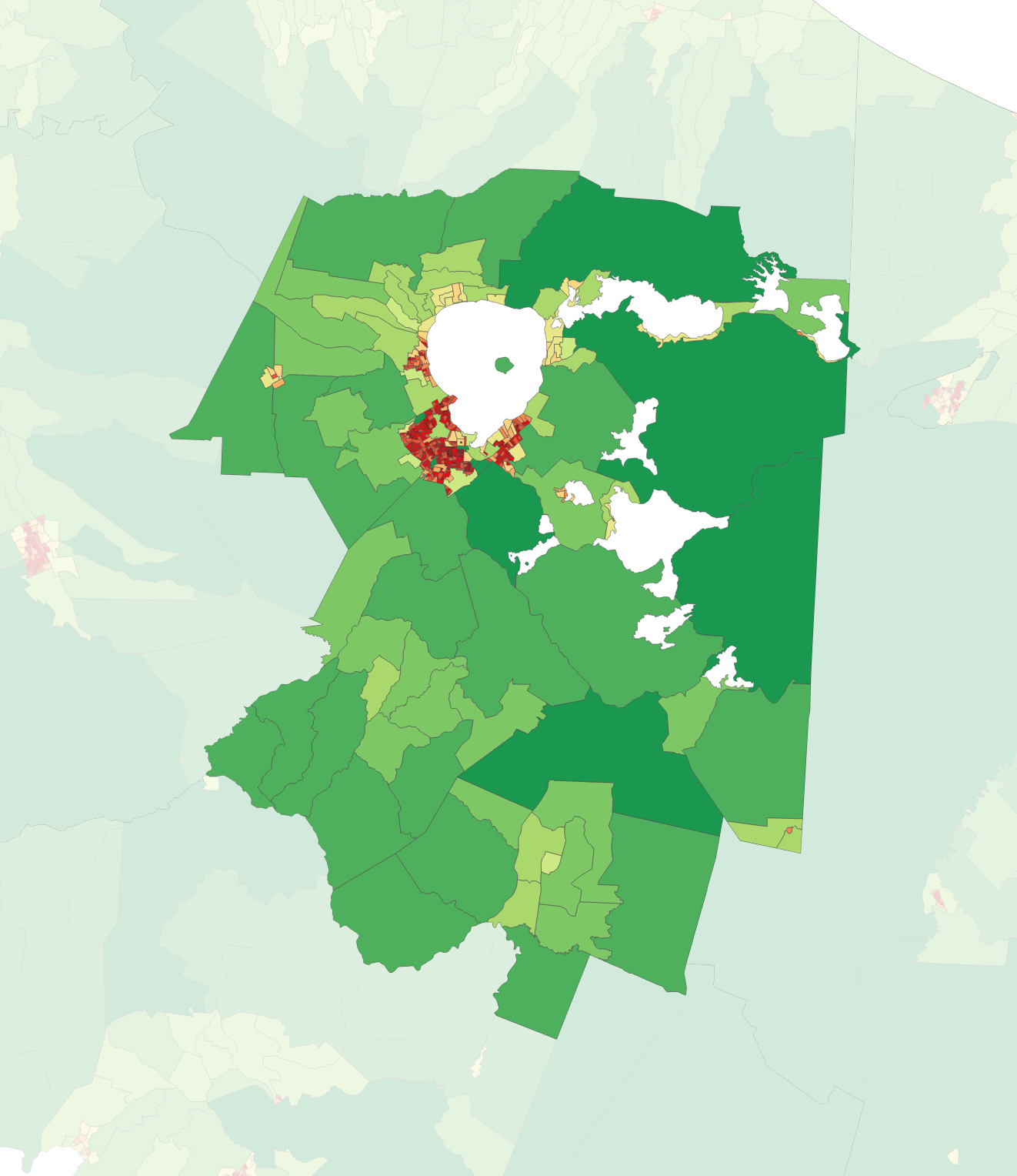
Population density in the 2023 census

Individual wards
Name	Area (km^{2})	Population	Density (per km^{2})	Dwellings	Median age	Median income
Rotorua Rural General Ward	1,947.61	8,814	4.5	3,102	37.4 years	$44,400
Te Ipu Wai Auraki General Ward	461.70	65,244	141.3	22,803	36.5 years	$38,400
New Zealand					38.1 years	$41,500

== Local government ==
=== Local council ===
Every three years, a mayor and the district councillors are elected in local elections. In the most recent elections in 2022, Tania Tapsell was elected as mayor and ten councillors were returned. Rotorua Lakes uses the first-past-the-post (FPP) voting system and elects six councillors at-large, three for the Māori ward, and one for the rural ward.

==== Coat of arms ====
Coat of arms of Rotorua Lakes Council

Notes
The council has a coat of arms. The blazon is:
Crest
On a wreath of the colours a male huia bird standing in a brake of New Zealand fern proper.
Escutcheon
Azure on a chevron or a rainbow trout leaping proper between in chief a pine tree and a sprig of kōwhai leaved slipped and flowered and a geyser issuing from rock in base all also proper.
Supporters
On the dexter side a figure representing a farm settler of the nineteenth century, at his feet a cattle dog sejant and on the sinister side a figure representing a Māori chieftain all proper.
Motto
Tātau tātau (We together or We are one).

=== Sister cities ===
Rotorua has four sister cities:

- Klamath Falls, Oregon
- Beppu, Kyushu
- Lake Macquarie, New South Wales
- The Wuzhong District of Suzhou, China
