= Rotorua Lakes Council =

Territorial authority of New Zealand

Coordinates: 38.1358348°S 176.2529753°E

Rotorua Lakes Council Te Kaunihera o ngā Roto o Rotorua
- Coat of arms

- Brand logo

Type
- Type: Territorial authority of Rotorua District
- Term limits: None

History
- Established: 1 November 1989; 37 years ago
- Preceded by: Rotorua District Council
- New session started: 17 October 2025

Leadership
- Mayor: Tania Tapsell, Ind. since 14 October 2022
- Deputy: Sandra Kai Fong, Ind. since 21 October 2022
- CEO: Andrew Moraes since 11 March 2024

Structure
- Seats: 11 (including mayor)
- Political groups: Independent (10); Te Pāti Māori (1)
- Length of term: 3 years

Elections
- Voting system: First-past-the-post
- First election: 14 October 1989
- Last election: 11 October 2025
- Next election: 14 October 2028

Motto
- Tātau Tātau

Meeting place
- 1061 Haupapa Street, Rotorua

Website
- rotorualakescouncil.nz

Rotorua Lakes Council (RLC; Māori: Te Kaunihera o ngā Roto o Rotorua) is the territorial authority for the Rotorua District of New Zealand. It serves as the district's local government alongside the Bay of Plenty Regional Council as the main regional council. The authority's official legal name is Rotorua District Council; the council adopted the current operating name in 2014. The first Rotorua District Council was formed in 1979; in 1989 it was abolished and reconstituted anew.

The governing body of the council has 10 councillors and is chaired by the mayor of Rotorua. There are also two community boards. Tania Tapsell has been the mayor since October 2022.

== Governing body ==
=== Mayor ===
One mayor is elected at-large; they chair meetings of the governing body and act as the head of local government in the district.

=== Current composition ===
The current members of the governing body of council are:

Role	Portrait	Name	Affiliation	Ward
Mayor		Tania Tapsell	Independent	Elected at-large
Deputy		Sandra Kai Fong	Independent	General
Councillor		Fisher Wang	Independent	General
Councillor		Ben Sandford	Independent	General
Councillor		Gregg Brown	Independent	General
Councillor		Don Paterson	Independent	General
Councillor		Robert Lee	Independent	General
Councillor		Te Rika Temara-Fenfell	Te Pāti Māori	Māori
Councillor		Trevor Maxwell	Independent	Māori
Councillor		Merepeka Raukawa-Tait	Independent	Māori
Councillor		Karen Barker	Independent	Rural

== Community boards ==
The Rotorua Lakes Council has created two community boards, under the provisions of Part 4 of the Local Government Act 2002, to represent specific communities in Rotorua:

- Rotorua Lakes Community Board (established in 2007)
- Rotorua Rural Community Board (established in 2016)

Each community board consists of four elected members and a councillor appointed by the council, and is intended to provide advice to the city council regarding the interests of their communities.

== Coat of arms ==
A coat of arms was granted by the College of Arms to the city of Rotorua on 10 December 1963. At the time it was granted, it was believed to be the only city in New Zealand with a motto in Māori. The motto is credited to Pakeke Leonard, a former deputy mayor of Rotorua.

On 2 April 1979, the arms were subsequently adopted at the first meeting of the Rotorua District Council. The blazon for the arms is:

Coat of arms of Rotorua
Crest On a wreath of the colours a male huia bird standing in a brake of New Zealand fern proper. Escutcheon Azure on a chevron Or a rainbow trout leaping proper between in chief a pine tree and a sprig of kōwhai leaved slipped and flowered and a geyser issuing from rock in base all also proper. Supporters On the dexter side a figure representing a farm settler of the nineteenth century, at his feet a cattle dog sejant and on the sinister side a figure representing a Māori chieftain all proper. Motto Tātau tātau ("We together")

== Elections ==
=== List ===
==== Mayoral ====
- 1989
- 1992
- 1995
- 1998
- 2001
- 2004
- 2007
- 2010
- 2013
- 2016
- 2019
- 2022
- 2025

==== Council ====
- 1989
- 1992
- 1995
- 1998
- 2001
- 2004
- 2007
- 2010
- 2013
- 2016
- 2019
- 2022
- 2025
