= Tania Tapsell =

New Zealand politician

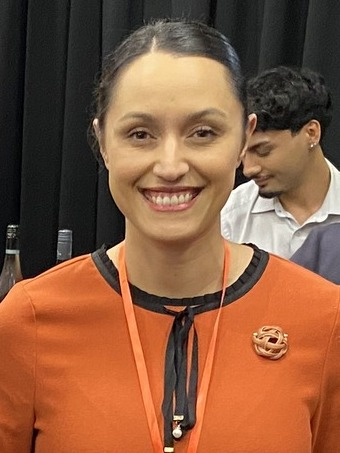
- Tapsell in 2025

15th Mayor of Rotorua
- Incumbent
- Assumed office 8 October 2022
- Deputy: Sandra Kai Fong
- Preceded by: Steve Chadwick

Rotorua Lakes District councillor
- In office 12 October 2013 – 8 October 2022

Personal details
- Born: 22 September 1992 (age 34) Rotorua, New Zealand
- Party: National
- Spouse: Kanin Clancy
- Relations: Peter Tapsell (great-uncle)
- Education: University of Waikato

Tania Tapsell (born 22 September 1992) is a New Zealand politician. She has served on the Rotorua Lakes District Council since 2013 and was elected mayor of Rotorua at the 2022 local elections. She is the first woman of Māori descent to hold the role.

== Early life ==
Tapsell was born and raised in Rotorua. She attended Rotorua Girls' High School but left at age 16 in order to attend Waiariki Institute of Technology, where she got diplomas in business and marketing. She achieved a Bachelor of Management Studies Degree from the University of Waikato, and is a qualified Resource Management Commissioner.

== Early political career ==
At age 14, Tapsell served on Rotorua's youth council. In 2010, she was selected by Todd McClay to represent the Rotorua electorate at the New Zealand Youth Parliament and also represented New Zealand at a Young Leaders Conference in Taiwan.

=== Rotorua District councillor, 2013–2022 ===
In 2013, Tapsell was elected to the Rotorua Lakes District Council and served as Chairperson of the Council's Operations and Monitoring Committee. At 21, she was the youngest councillor ever elected, until the election of 19 year old Fisher Wang in 2019. In 2016 and 2019 she was re-elected as the highest polling candidate.

She voted against the adoption of Māori wards in 2021, arguing that while some councils may need them to ensure representation, Rotorua did not.

Tapsell marched with students during the School Strike for Climate in 2019, however she believes farmers should be excluded from the Zero Carbon Act.

Tapsell has also served as Deputy Chairperson of the New Zealand Community Boards Executive Committee.

=== National Party candidacy ===
On 6 June 2020, Tapsell was selected as the National Party candidate for the East Coast electorate, having been a member of the party since she was a teen. At the 2020 general election, National failed to retain the seat, losing to Labour MP Kiri Allan. She expressed interest in running again at the 2023 New Zealand general election. She was speculated by the media as a possible candidate in the 2022 Tauranga by-election, but declined.

== First mayoral term, 2022–2025 ==
=== 2022 mayoral election ===
On 10 May 2022, Tapsell announced that she would run for mayor of Rotorua. Tapsell announced she would name fellow Councillor Sandra Kai Fong as deputy mayor if both are elected to the council in the October local election. Tapsell campaigned on stopping the spend, combating crime and vandalism, and restoring the city's image as a tourist destination.

On 8 October 2022, Tapsell was elected as Mayor, becoming the first Māori woman to be elected as Mayor of Rotorua. She defeated fellow mayoral candidate Ben Sandford by almost 3,300 votes. She and her fellow councillors were sworn into office on 22 October.

In September 2023, Tapsell was recognized in The New Zealand Herald's feature on the 130th anniversary of Women’s Suffrage as one of the most influential women in today’s society.

=== Housing and infrastructure ===
In her first year as Mayor, Tapsell turned around a $5.6 million deficit and adopted an Annual Plan that stopped unnecessary spending and made investment in critical infrastructure a priority. To help solve issues in the Rotorua community, Tapsell delivered an exit plan from emergency housing by signing a Rotorua Housing Accord with Central Government which reduced the use of Rotorua motels for emergency housing by around half and ensured more homes were being built for locals. Within a month of being elected, Tapsell put forward a motion to reverse a decision of the previous Council to revoke the reserve status of seven Rotorua reserve sites for development. This was supported unanimously by the Council.

In August 2023, following community feedback, Tapsell and Councillors also voted to restore and reopen the Rotorua Museum – Te Whare Taonga o Te Arawa.

In July 2024, Tapsell supported the Sixth National Government's new housing growth plan as a means of addressing the housing shortage. By late July 2024, Tapsell had credited her policies with achieving a 60% reduction in emergency housing motels. The Ministry of Housing and Urban Development also confirmed that it intended to stop referring people to emergency housing in Rotorua by July 2024.

=== Law and order ===
To address community safety concerns in Rotorua, Tapsell advocated for an Inner City Community Safety Hub and officially opened this in November 2023 in partnership with Police.

As Mayor of Rotorua, Tapsell invested NZ$1 million in various anti-crime measures including CCTV cameras, increasing the Police presence on streets and a community hub that combined the resources of Police, the Lakes Council, Māori Wardens, private security and community safety volunteers.

=== Financial management ===
On 1 November 2024, the Rotorua Lakes Council's 2024 Annual Report gave the council a stable outlook, with an AA− credit rating and an operating surplus of $2.2 million.

=== Māori wards ===
In late February 2023, Tapsell and a majority of the Rotorua Lakes Councillors voted to withdraw their support from the proposed Rotorua Lakes Council local bill, which would have increased the number of Māori wards on the Council.

In early September 2024, Tapsell and a majority of her fellow councillors voted to hold a binding referendum on its three-member Māori ward during the 2025 New Zealand local elections. While Tapsell had voted against the introduction of Māori wards in 2021, she said that "they shouldn't be forcibly removed due to a Government. I believe in local decision-making and am happy to support retaining them."

=== Community engagement ===
In mid February 2023, Tapsell and the majority of the Rotorua Lakes Council voted to progress a submissions policy that would allow the Council to reject public submissions that were deemed offensive, discriminatory or contained personal threats. Tapsell said that there had been a significant increase in offensive submissions. The submissions policy was criticised by Councillors Robert Lee, Conan O'Brien and Don Patterson on free speech grounds. In response, the Free Speech Union warned that it would take legal action against the Council.

In mid July 2024, Tapsell expressed concerns that a Council proposal to introduce public forums "could be weaponised or used by people to have a rant." Councillor Robert Lee had proposed establishing public forums during a June 2024 meeting with the Council asking Lakes Council chief executive Andrew Moraes to conduct research on the idea. Since 2000, the Lakes Council had never hosted public forums. By contrast, 85% of local councils have hosted public forums.

=== International issues ===
In late July 2024, Tapsell attracted media attention after blocking Councillor Trevor Maxwell from asking why two notices of motions, including one by Councillor Lani Kereopa, called for a ceasefire in Gaza. Both motions had been declined because Lake Council staff had deemed them not to be council business. When Maxwell asked why the motions had been declined, Tapsell refused to discuss the matter and insisted that it was outside council business. Maxwell expressed disappointment. The exchange was filmed and posted on Instagram. Following the incident, Tapsell defended her response and reiterated her commitment to "delivering" for the community.

In late August 2024, Tapsell signed a friendship agreement between Rotorua and Taiwan's Pingtung County's Magistrate Chou Chun-mi.

== Second term, 2025–present ==
=== 2025 local elections ===
Tapsell ran for re-election as mayor during the 2025 Rotorua Lakes Council election. According to preliminary results, she was re-elected as Mayor in a landslide victory, defeating her competitors Don Paterson, Robert Lee, Haehaetu Barrett and Takeina Fraser by nearly 3,000 votes.

=== Housing and homelessness ===
In late November 2025, Tapsell defended the Rotorua Council and National-led government's policy of ending contracted emergency housing motels in Rotorua. The opposition Labour housing spokesperson Kieran McAnulty had contended that the government's policy of ending the use of motels as emergency housing risked bringing back homeless, claiming that he had seen eight homeless people during a visit to Rotorua. In response, Tapsell said that she did not want her town used as "political football" and disputed McAnulty's claim that ending emergency housing motels had contributed to an increase in "rough sleeping."

=== 2026 Tarawera Reserve ownership transfer ===
In late September 2026, Tapsell and most of her Rotorua Council colleagues voted to transfer administration of the Crown-owned Tarawera Landing Reserve, which is occupied by the Rotorua Thermal Holiday Park, to the Māori iwi Ngāti Whakaue's Pukeroa Oruawhata Trust. The sole objector was Councillor Robert Lee. In mid-November 2026, Tapsell denied that she was a beneficiary of the Pukeroa Oruawhata Trust, which would have constituted a conflict of interest. She accused Lee of damaging her reputation by suggesting she was involved with the Pukeroa Trust.

== Personal life ==
Tapsell married Kanin Clancy on 1 December 2020. With him she has a stepson named Kaiarahi. On 10 March 2023, Tapsell announced that they were expecting a baby girl in June. On 2 June she gave birth to Kahumoa at Rotorua Hospital, making her the second mayor in New Zealand to give birth while in office.

Her iwi are Te Arawa and Ngāti Whakaue, and she has Danish ancestry as a descendent of Phillip Tapsell. She is the great niece of former Labour MP and Speaker of the House Sir Peter Tapsell.
