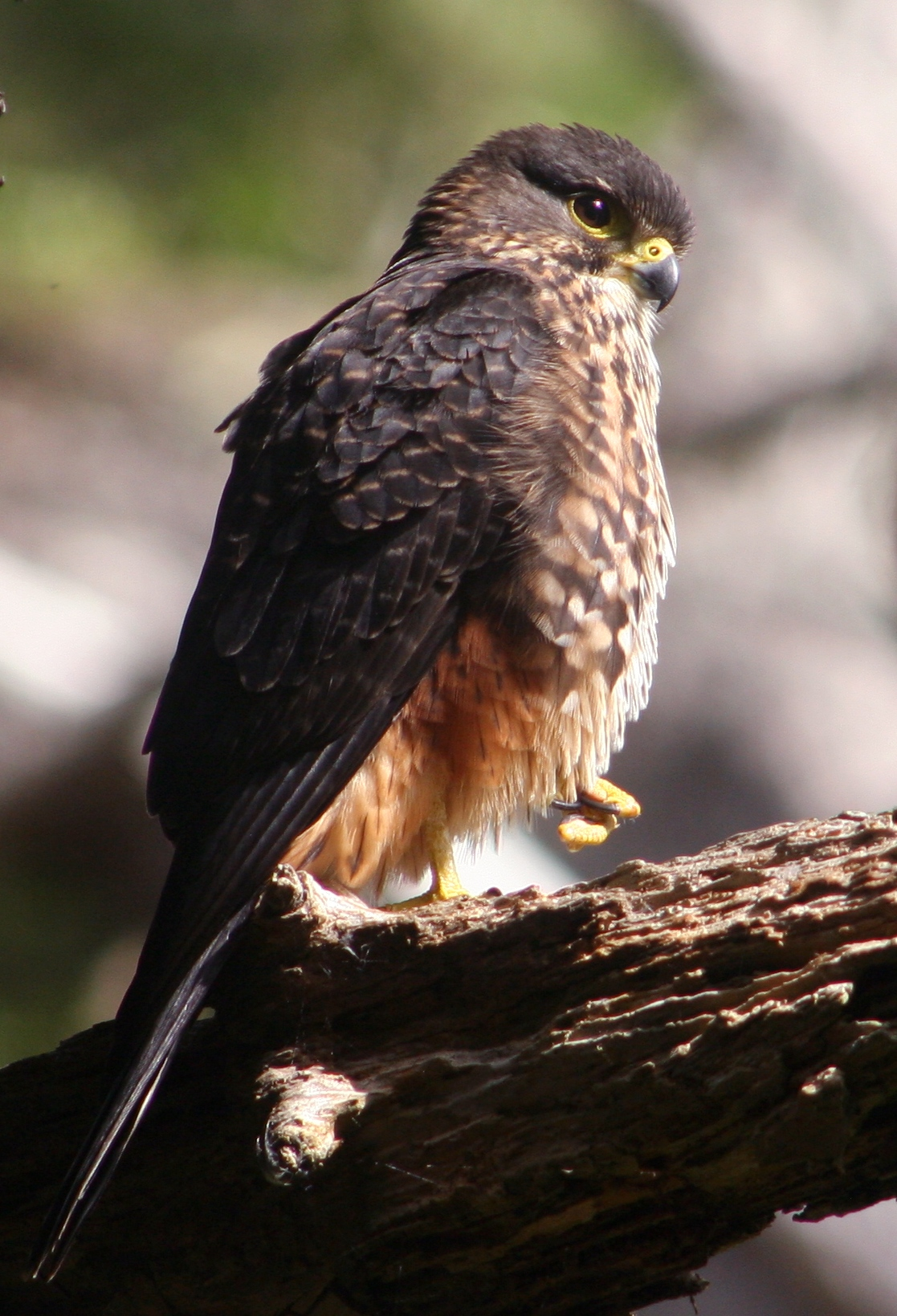
- Male falcon

Conservation status
- Least Concern (IUCN 3.1)
- CITES Appendix II

Scientific classification
- Kingdom: Animalia
- Phylum: Chordata
- Class: Aves
- Order: Falconiformes
- Family: Falconidae
- Subfamily: Falconinae
- Genus: Falco
- Species: F. novaeseelandiae

Binomial name
- Falco novaeseelandiae Gmelin, JF, 1788

Audio
- Recording of a female calling to get food from a male

= New Zealand falcon =

Species of bird

The New Zealand falcon (Māori: kārearea, kārewarewa, or kāiaia; Falco novaeseelandiae) is New Zealand's only falcon, and one of only four living native and two endemic birds of prey. It is frequently mistaken for the larger and more common swamp harrier. It is the country's most threatened bird of prey, with only around 5000–15000 individuals remaining. Under the New Zealand Threat Classification System the falcon is stable at Threatened, with conservation research needed. The kārearea was voted Bird of the Year winner in the annual Forest & Bird competition in 2012 and again in 2025.

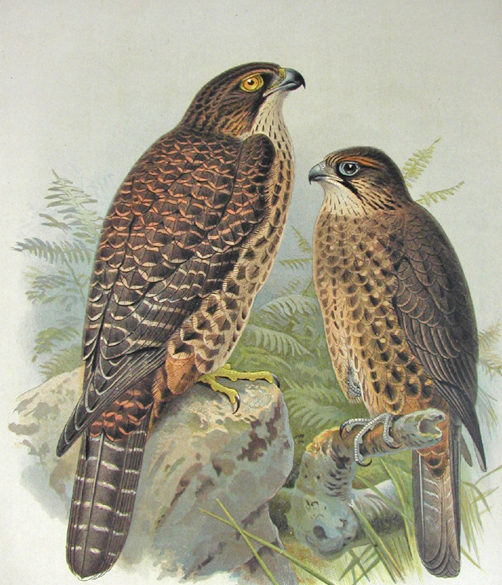
New Zealand falcon (adult and young) from Buller's Birds of New Zealand, 1888

== Taxonomy ==
The New Zealand falcon was formally described in 1788 by the German naturalist Johann Friedrich Gmelin in his revised and expanded edition of Carl Linnaeus's Systema Naturae. He placed it with the falcons and eagles in the genus Falco and coined the binomial name Falco novaeseelandiae. Gmelin based his description on the "New-Zealand falcon" that had been described and illustrated in 1781 by the English ornithologist John Latham. Latham had examined specimens both in the British Museum and in the Leverian Museum.

Ornithologists variously described the New Zealand falcon as an aberrant hobby or as allied to three South American species – F. deiroleucus (orange-breasted falcon), F. rufigularis (bat falcon), and F. femoralis (aplomado falcon); molecular phylogenetic studies show that it is most closely related to the aplomado falcon. Three forms are apparent from their significantly different sizes, with the larger 'eastern falcon' form in the eastern and central South Island, the smaller 'bush falcon' form in the central and south North Island, and an intermediary 'southern falcon' form in Fiordland, Stewart Island, and the Auckland Islands. The relationships between the distantly spaced populations of the southern form are uncertain. Although neutral genetic markers show a recent history of the two more distinct forms, the substantial size difference is likely to be driven by ecological adaptation as they occupy different habitats. Conservation management had already avoided mixing of the different populations. The forms are classified separately under the New Zealand Threat Classification System. The eastern falcon is Threatened, Nationally Vulnerable with a stable population. The southern falcon is Threatened, Nationally Endangered with less than 1000 estimated individuals. The bush falcon is Nationally Increasing.

== Description ==
The forms of the New Zealand falcon differ in size, colouration, and habitat. The eastern falcon is larger and paler, while the bush falcon is smaller and darker. The southern falcon sits between the other forms in colouration and size, but has a habitat more similar to the bush falcon. The eastern falcon on average has more white tail bars in their tail feathers than the other two forms. The bush falcon primarily lives in forests while the eastern falcon is present in open steppe habitats. The bush falcons have shorter wings with better manoeuvrability within forests.

Male New Zealand falcons are about two-thirds the size of female falcons. The eastern form of the New Zealand falcon has an average wingspan of 83 cm (33 in) in females and 72 cm (28 in) in males. Males of the eastern form range in weight from 300 to 350 g (11 to 12 oz), and the bush form ranges from 250 to 300 g (8.8 to 10.6 oz). Females of the eastern form weigh between 450 and 600 g (16 and 21 oz), and females of the bush form weigh between 400 and 500 g (14 and 18 oz). The southern falcon weight sits between the eastern and bush forms.

Adult falcons have black, barred rufous, or grey feathers on their crown, nape, and back. The tail is black with white bars that vary in number. The wing tips are rounded and feathers are black or grey with bars on the inside. There is a cream streak down the throat from the beak and the breast is cream, with vertical streaks of black or dark brown. The abdomen is cream with streaked rufous. The base of the beak, eyes, and legs are all yellow. The beak is black with a tomial tooth. The claws are black and the eyes are dark brown. The legs are a dull yellow, which become vibrant for males during the breeding season.

Juvenile New Zealand falcons have a darker colouration and faint tail bars. The breast is brown and the abdomen is cream with fine brown streaks. The soft parts that become yellow are instead olive green, sky blue, or dull grey in adolescent falcons under 9 months old. The full adult plumage is reached by 16 months.

== Distribution and habitat ==
The New Zealand falcon is only found in New Zealand.

The native habitat of the eastern falcons in the eastern and central South Island is open country and steppes, with nests on steep slopes or rock ledges. In native podocarp broadleaf forests of the North Island the bush falcon hunts at forest edges and nests in pre-existing tree structures such as epiphytes and tree cavities of mature trees, or on a sheltered ground area. The southern falcon is found in the Auckland Islands, Stewart Island, and Fiordland in forest habitats near oceans, with ecological similarities to the bush falcon rather than the closer eastern falcon.

The native habitats of the New Zealand falcon have been reduced through human development of land for the purposes of agriculture, vineyards, forestry, and housing, impacting nest sites and prey abundance. The habitat range of the falcon has increased to include human-modified landscapes such as pine plantations in the North island and farmlands in the South Island. Falcons have been recorded living in or near exotic pine plantation stands since the 1990s, nesting in stands that are unplanted or less than 5 years old. Regeneration of other plants in older stands prevents the falcon from nesting on the ground. Eastern falcons in the South Island were translocated to vineyards in Marlborough and have been breeding successfully since 2006 with the help of supplementary feeding, hunting vineyard pests, and predator-proof nest sites.

== Ecology and behaviour ==
The New Zealand falcon is a sedentary bird that spends most of its time within or close to its home range. The home range of a falcon varies, with calculations from 200 km^{2} to 15 km^{2}, with dependence on food availability. Outside of the breeding season solitary or pairs of falcons will use permanent sheltered roosts. The falcon will use a temporary roost during the breeding season if their nest site is far away from their permanent roost.

The falcon is noted to sunbathe for up to 30 minutes in the morning with its darker back to the sun.

The New Zealand falcon is aggressive to non-prey animals. When confronting another falcon, a swamp harrier, or strong prey on the ground the falcon will push its weight back towards its fanned tail and open its wings slightly. Its eyes stay on the combatant and it keeps its feet free to attack. It will sometimes lie on its back and defend itself with its feet. When intruders such as swamp harriers and humans get too close to nests the falcon will make loud kekking noises alongside stooping at the head of the intruder. Aggression towards other New Zealand falcons is seen during the breeding season but subsides outside of it. Observations of captive falcons stooping rabbits and a cat were noted as playful or territorial rather than for hunting purposes. Falcons of all ages and sexes will play, initiated by turning their head upside down. They will chase, swoop and mock-attack each other, or if alone they will attack sticks, clumps of grass, or roots. Breeding pairs will often play together. Sometimes prey is caught several times before being killed, as play or practice.

The New Zealand falcon has a high-pitched kek kek kek call that is usually heard in territory defence, with the male's call at a higher pitch than the female's. Adults will also chitter to each other, particularly after copulation. The kekking call is 3–12 syllables, is used by both sexes all year, and travels over long distances. The chitter is 3–6 syllables and is used with other falcons. There is a 'chup' call which sounds like the first syllable of a chitter, which is often used during play. In serious situations with other predators the falcon will 'squeal'. The squeal is sometimes used by captive falcons during handling.

Both endoparasites and exoparasites have been noted on the New Zealand falcon, but are not considered a major threat. Lice are common on fledglings but once the down is replaced by adult feathers their abundance decreases.

=== Food and feeding ===
The New Zealand falcon has a wide range of prey it hunts, but is mostly made up of live introduced and native birds caught in the air. The composition of bird prey is largely based on species abundance with little selection. The most common avian prey includes introduced finch, lark, pipit, and thrush species, silvereyes, blackbirds, and the yellowhammer. Other avian prey include other passerines, waterfowl, seabirds (e.g., gulls), domestic poultry and gamebirds (e.g., ring-necked pheasants), parakeets, pigeons, and even herons. The falcon is adept at capturing introduced birds, with their make up in the prey composition being slightly higher than their proportional abundance. There is also little preference shown for the size of the prey, with birds from the 7 g (0.25 oz) grey warbler to the 1,300 g (46 oz) pheasants hunted successfully. The falcon evolved without the presence of mammalian prey, but now small mammals like hares, rabbits, stoats, mice, and rats make up a small part of their diet. They also hunt skinks and hard-bodied insects like beetles, locusts, cicadas, and dragonflies. It also occasionally takes advantage of carrion (including fish) to get a quick meal. One was recorded feeding on the fruits of Styphelia nesophila. As the prey composition is closely related to the local species abundance, studies on the diet of the three forms come with slightly different results. The eastern falcon is recorded with a higher proportion of mammalian prey than the bush falcon. In pine plantations the bush falcon hunts a higher proportion of introduced birds. The southern falcon hunts forest birds as well as seabirds when they come in at dusk, and one was recorded eating a 975 g (34.4 oz) little blue penguin.

The New Zealand falcon has little competition for food as there are no native mammalian predators, and 2 other native birds of prey are nocturnal. They do compete with the swamp harrier, which searches for prey while flying. The competition reduces over winter when the swamp harrier relies more on carrion that the falcon does not eat.

The New Zealand falcon has many hunting techniques used to catch their wide variety of live prey, including multiple aerial hunting techniques for catching avian prey in the air or on the ground. These techniques are often used in combination with one another. It often hunts around forest edges or rivers where there are breaks from cover. It can search for prey from a still perched position, from flying, or stalking on the ground. When still-hunting it will perch and preen in a seemingly inactive way, moving perch every 10 or so minutes until it detects prey. It has two aerial searching techniques. It can soar and prospect 50 to 200 m (160 to 660 ft) high, which often leads to a direct or stooping attack on high flying prey. The more effective search strategy is contour-hugging, a fast flight that follows the shape of the landscape and allows the falcon to sneak up on and attack agile birds. These techniques lead to quick tail-chases and attacks rather than stalking like other birds of prey due to the fast flying speed of the falcon. Stalking occurs on the ground, usually after noticing the prey from above or after chased prey escapes to the ground. When prey escapes into dense foliage cover a falcon will dive after it to flush out the prey with the impact, then resume the chase. It has flexible and resilient feathers which protect it from injury during this, unlike other raptors. The falcon also has excellent hearing and will find prey through listening, particularly with nests of bird chicks. The falcon is not willing to dive into water after prey.

When prey is found it is quickly attacked. The most common is a direct flying attack, often made at low elevations where the falcon is above the prey. It approaches with a loud fast flapping-flight, using foliage cover or a rapid approach to take the prey by surprise. This is the first attack used by young falcons and has a success rate of around 40%. It is efficient on slow prey, but if used alongside contour-hugging it can be successful on fast and agile prey. If the first attack on a bird does not succeed a tail-chase will ensue for up to 15 minutes before catching the prey or giving up. The falcon will stay 2 to 4 m (6.6 to 13.1 ft) behind the bird, and can prevent prey from diving into cover by getting underneath and cutting it off. In the air the falcon can also use stooping, where it dives 100 to 200 m (330 to 660 ft) and strikes the prey with its feet. Steeper dives are used on larger birds, and multiple stoops can be used to push the prey to the ground so it's vulnerable enough for a direct attack. Stooping can be used as a surprise attack from greater heights, but is most common within tail-chases and in cooperative hunting where two falcons take turns to climb and stoop, wearing out the prey. The most successful attack is the glide attack, used by the falcon from a perched position. The falcon glides down and picks up speed, closing then quickly opening its wings and tail feathers before attacking the prey. This attack is quiet, quick, and very successful, but not commonly used by falcons in open areas.

The New Zealand falcon has also been recorded hunting on the ground, extracting nestlings from tree-hole or crevice nests, and stalking lizards. In the Auckland Islands they hunt seabirds at night under the forest canopy, and enter seabird burrows to catch live chicks.

Once the New Zealand falcon subdues its avian, mammalian, or reptilian prey, it kills it by dislocating the neck vertebrate with its beak. This usually occurs on the ground but can also occur in the air. From there it picks up the prey and moves it to a more suitable location for feeding. It starts by eating the back of the head, then consuming the head. The deaths of small mammals and birds that are found headless are often attributed to the falcon. The falcon then feeds from the neck down, plucking feathers down the body in birds but not removing fur in mammals. Bits of the legs and wings are left uneaten, and plucked feathers can be used to identify the type of prey. After eating the falcon will clean itself off and fly elsewhere for an inactive period. Indigestible parts that are eaten are later regurgitated as a pellet. Captured insects are held in one foot and killed by the crushing of either the head or thoracic region. Inedible parts are discarded. Captive falcons or wild individuals with siblings will spread their wings and tails to cover their newly killed prey with a position called 'mantling' before taking it elsewhere to eat.

The New Zealand falcon does not eat carrion unless it is taught how to. Captive falcons are trained to recognise the meat they are given as food. It does however cache prey it has caught but not finished eating, and will take days to eat a large item of prey. The falcon will often kill multiple birds in a row without eating them, instead caching them then returning to hunt more. Caching sites of eastern falcons include high bushes, tussocks, tree-stumps, and small trees, all under 3 m (0.0019 mi). The falcon is stuffed into a small space and the falcon will examine and adjust the prey until satisfied. Caching occurs throughout the year but occurs more frequently when prey is abundant. Cached prey is used mostly for feeding nestlings, or during midday summer heats when the falcon is lethargic.

Intact seeds have been recorded in New Zealand falcon pellets previously, and were attributed to secondary consumption from eaten frugivorous birds, but there has been one observation of a falcon directly consuming an orange alpine fleshy fruit from Leucopogon fraseri. The faecal sac was examined and found to have intact seeds from that plant and another species, Gaultheria depressa. Captive falcons have also been observed to eat fruit given to them.

Like other raptors, the use of rangle stomach stones to aid digestion is present in the New Zealand falcon.

=== Breeding ===
The breeding season spans from October to March, throughout the late spring and summer months. Courtship is initiated by the male, who brings food to the female. The female then chases the male with a following noisy flight with aerobatics performed mostly by the male. The pair will play. Copulation is short and occurs several times with wide intervals of a few hours. Female falcons tend to attempt breeding earlier in their lives than male falcons, with some female falcons successfully breeding in their first year under favourable conditions. The New Zealand falcon tends to stay in the same pair and breeding territory each breeding season. Nests can be consecutively used, or a new nest within 5 km (3.1 mi) of the old one is used.

Nest selection tends to favour sites with views to help with opportunistic hunting and shelter from wind. The New Zealand falcon does not build a nest, but uses pre-existing structures as a nest scrape. The type of nest varies between the different forms.

Eastern falcons mostly nest on cliff ledges. In Otago, the falcons show a preference for unmodified tussock or riparian habitat with steeper slopes up to 39° for their nest scrapes. The nests are found at altitudes between 100 and 1,200 m (0.062 and 0.746 mi), usually overlook streams, are within 100 m (0.062 mi) of a river, and do not face south. The distance between pairs varies from 2 to 13 km (1.2 to 8.1 mi). Artificial nesting sites have been provided in vineyards for the New Zealand falcon as a pest control and conservation programme. In native podocarp forests bush falcons nest in epiphytes, tree cavities, and snags on mature trees, but will nest on a sheltered ground spot when these are absent. Epiphytes in emergent trees are preferred for better views of prey and predators, and the foliage of the epiphyte screens the nest on most sides. The nests tend to be close to water.

Bush falcons in the central North Island have been nesting increasingly in pine plantation forests, including the 180,000 ha Kaingaroa forest. They nest in pine stands up to 5 years old, with preference for stands that are unplanted or less than 1 year old, as older stands have higher ground cover and less space for ground nests. Nest scrapes within pine plantations are all on the ground as there are no epiphytes or tree cavities that a falcon would use in a native podocarp forest. Nest scrapes are sheltered by pine debris. In breeding territories of pine stands adjacent to mature native podocarp forests nest scrapes in epiphytes are preferred and the pine stand is only used for hunting. Nests are on average 3 km (1.9 mi) away from each other, but can be as close as 1 km (0.62 mi). Plantation forests tend to have ongoing pest control for invasive mammals that threaten the stand, such as possums, hares, and sometimes rats, making these forests safer from nest predation than uncontrolled native forest. The open space between pine trees and stands allows for easier spotting and hunting of prey within the forest.

The New Zealand falcon will defend its nest territory from threats over 100m away from the nest itself with loud noise and attacks. The defence starts as soon as the nest scrape is made, and the male will defend the nest from up to 500m away, further than the female. They mostly attack swamp harriers, people, cats, dogs, and other large birds, but will also attack intruding horses and helicopters.

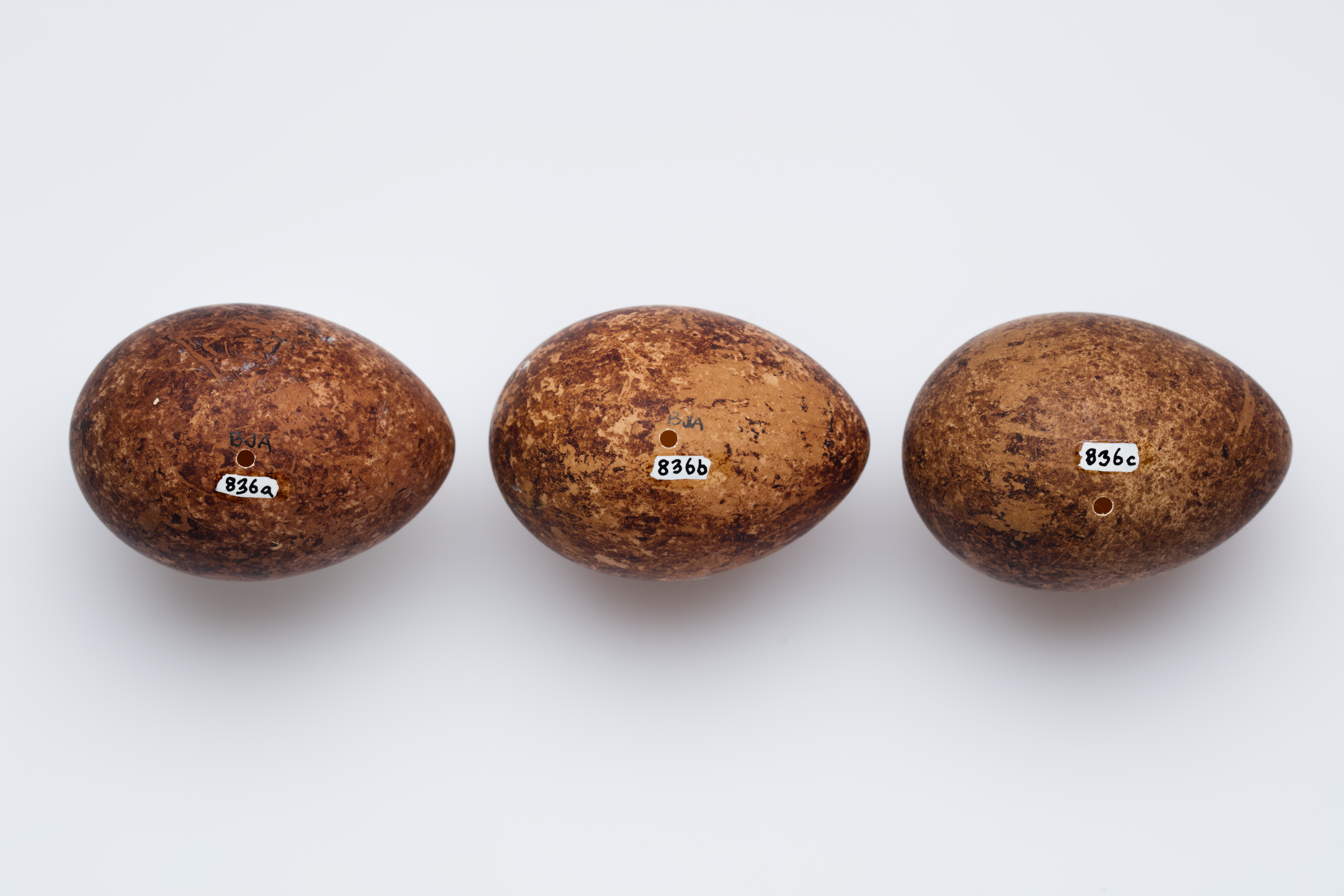
Falco novaeseelandiae eggs in the collection of Auckland Museum

Two to four eggs are laid from September to December. The ovoid eggs vary in colour, but are usually pale to very dark pink when first laid, and are around 40 g (1.4 oz). They then become blotched with brown markings. Incubation time is shared between the male and female parents, with the female doing the majority. During incubation attentiveness stays above 90%, increasing with bad weather conditions and the eggs are left for no longer than 1 minute with exceptions of disturbance events.

After 30–35 days of incubation the chicks hatch, but as low as 25 days has been recorded for the bush falcon and attributed to the warmer area. The chicks hatch with open eyes and ears, white natal down, and pink legs. Brooding is mostly carried out by the female parent and decreases until about 10 days after hatching, when brooding only occurs during bad weather or overnight. A second thicker grey down grows and the chicks can start thermoregulating, then from 14 days feathers start to appear. Prey is delivered to the nest, primarily by the male but as brooding time decreases the female starts hunting as well, though will not travel as far from the nest. During the early nesting period the male will deliver prey to the female, who will feed it to the chicks. The prey delivery is announced with a kekking call that is responded to by begging calls from the chicks and the female when brooding. The begging call is accompanied by a low posture directed at the beak or feet of the parent. It is only after the two week mark that the males will deliver food directly to the chicks. Self feeding starts soon after this. Female falcons tend to perch on trees within 100 metres (330 feet) when not incubating or brooding. Prey deliveries increase in frequency until the chicks are about two weeks old, where it stabilises to a consistent frequency of about one prey item per 70 minutes, depending on the hunting conditions. The prey items are dependent on the composition of prey in the area, but are usually other birds, and are cached nearby and delivered again if not fully eaten. By 18 days old the chicks have reached the same size as the adults. One sibling usually receives a higher proportion of prey, with aggressive competition between siblings over food. Fledging occurs at around 5 weeks, slightly longer for females than males. Prey deliveries decrease just before the chicks fledge. Though the incubation and brooding are mostly carried out by the female, in the case that the female parent leaves or dies the male parent will increase attentiveness to make up for the absence and can successfully raise and fledge chicks alone.

After fledging the chicks learn to hunt and fly for at least four weeks. Live chicks of other species are used to teach the fledglings how to hunt. A parent will steal a live chick from a nest and call to the fledglings, dropping the prey for them to catch. The parent will lead the fledgling in a chase of up to 100m before dropping the prey to be caught. The presence of parents and siblings alters their behaviour within this time and should result in a faster development of hunting and flying skills. Juveniles with siblings play more than those without, and as they get older the number of flights is also higher. Within this time juveniles may attempt to hunt, but success is unlikely. Juvenile falcons have no interest in traps used to capture adult New Zealand falcons until about 50 days after fledging.

About two months after fledging the juvenile falcons will disperse from their natal territories. The dispersal distance varies depending on the falcon population in the area and the abundance of food. In a pine plantation forest the mean dispersal distance is 9.5 km (5.9 mi), but dispersal of over 30 km (19 mi) occurs. Natal dispersal occurs between March and May, which is when there are the most falcon sightings, and also a higher number of falcon deaths. Recorded deaths are mostly from electrocution, but also include other man-made hazards such as introduced cats, road hazards, shooting, poison, and window strike. Juvenile falcons make up a large proportion of these deaths. Falcons are also killed by swamp harriers, but these deaths are not recorded in proportion to their occurrence.

== Relationship with humans ==
=== Falconry ===
The Wingspan National Bird of Prey Centre in the Ngongotahā Valley is a captive breeding facility and visitor centre. Wingspan undertakes conservation, education and research activities related to birds of prey found in New Zealand, and provides demonstrations of falconry.

=== Falcons for Grapes programme ===
In 2005, funding was given by the Ministry of Agriculture and Forestry towards a programme that uses the falcons to control birds that damage grapes and act as pests in vineyards as well as monitoring the birds and establishing a breeding population in the vicinity of the Marlborough wine region. Initially, four falcons were relocated to the vineyards from the surrounding hills. After the release of a further 15 birds breeding began to occur – the first time it is thought to have happened since land clearance 150 years ago. The falcons are provided with predator-proof artificial nests and supplementary feeding. Breeding pairs within the vineyards are found to have higher nest attendance, brooding, and better feeding than in nearby natural habitats.

=== Cardrona Kārearea Conservation Project ===
The Cardrona Valley in the South Island has a small population of falcons. The five-year project that started in 2019 will focus on collecting data on the kārearea to gather knowledge of sightings, locate breeding pairs, locate and monitor nests, and gain insights on breeding population, habitat use, and territory size.

=== Illegal shooting ===
New Zealand falcon are fully protected under the Wildlife Act 1953. However, there are many reported instances of falcons being illegally shot. In the 1970s, two decades after being protected, it was estimated that at least 100 falcons were being shot in the South Island each year due to lack of public knowledge and similarity to the swamp harrier. A survey of 100 locals found that only one person knew that falcons were protected. The founder of Wingspan, Debbie Stewart, says: "Most of the birds we get in here have been shot. It's criminal." She has also said that human activities lead to the deaths of three-quarters of falcons in their first year. Both Stewart and the Department of Conservation have claimed that people shooting New Zealand falcons have interests in chickens or racing pigeons.

=== Electrocution threat ===
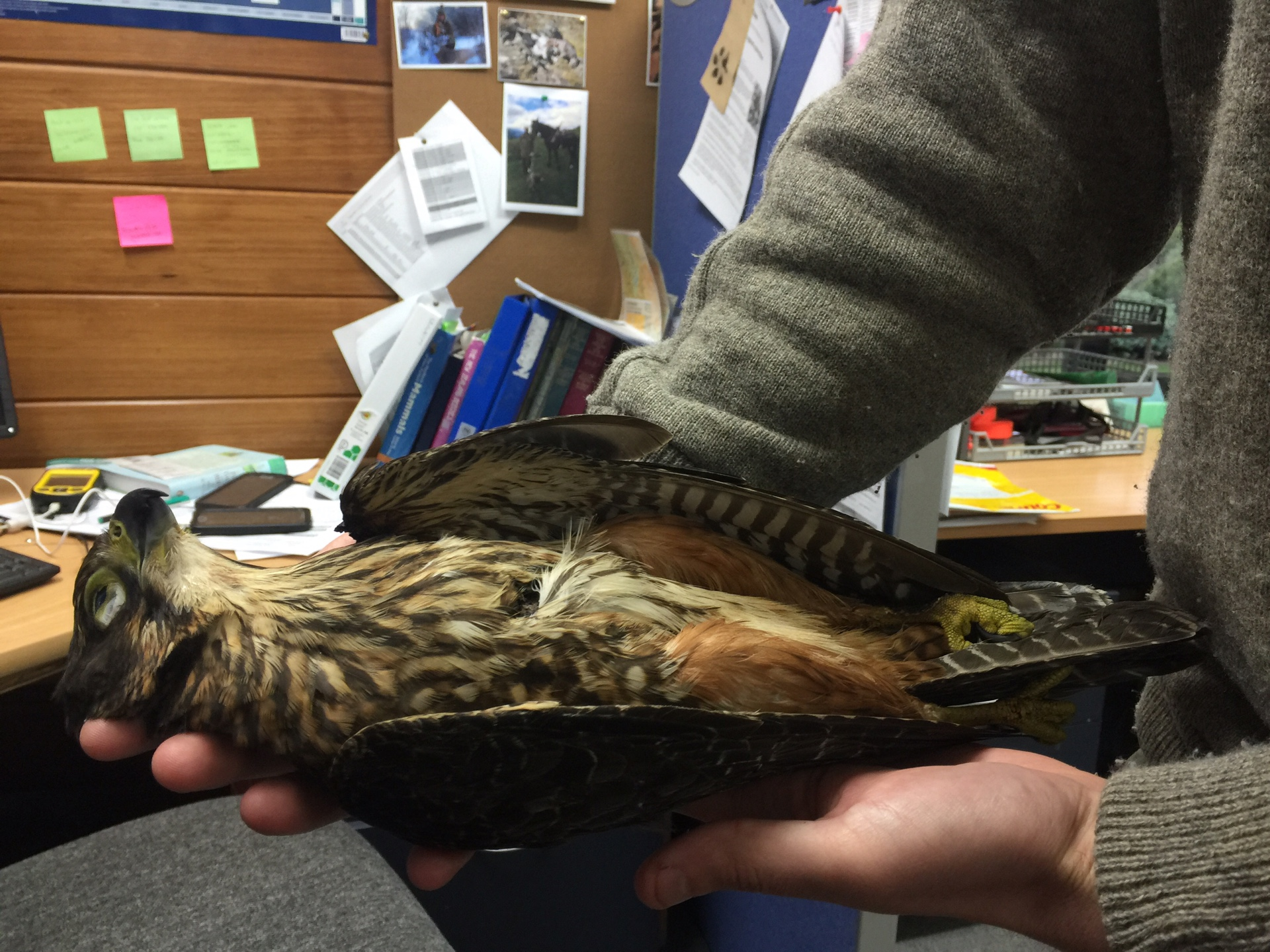
Electrocuted New Zealand falcon found at Glenorchy

Another ongoing threat to the birds from human activity is electrocution. Both a five-year radio tracking study of released birds in Marlborough and an observational study in Glenorchy have attributed nearly half of the bird deaths to electrocution on 11,000 volt distribution transformers and structures.

=== Cultural significance ===
In Māori mythology the New Zealand falcon acts as a messenger from a young chief in Whāngāpē to the twin sisters Reitū and Reipae in the Waikato he wished to marry. The twins were picked up by the messenger to travel north, and after an altercation only Reitū travelled north while Reipae stayed in Whangārei and married another chief.

The New Zealand falcon's head plume would be worn by Māori warriors to be seen as fierce and reckless, like the falcon. The falcon was also seen as bold, assertive, and treacherous. The New Zealand falcon was observed by Māori for weather predictions, as its scream during fine weather foretold rain for the next day and its scream during rain foretold fine weather the next day.

The proverb "Me te kopae kārearea" or "like the nest of kārearea" means 'rarely seen'.

The New Zealand falcon features on the reverse of the New Zealand $20 note and has twice been used on New Zealand stamps. It was also featured on a collectable $5 coin in 2006.

The Royal New Zealand Air Force's aerobatic team is called the Black Falcons.

The kārearea was voted Bird of the Year winner in 2012. The Forest & Bird competition aims to raise awareness about New Zealand's native birds, their habitats, and the threats they face. The kārearea was again voted Bird of the Year in the 20th anniversary competition in 2025.

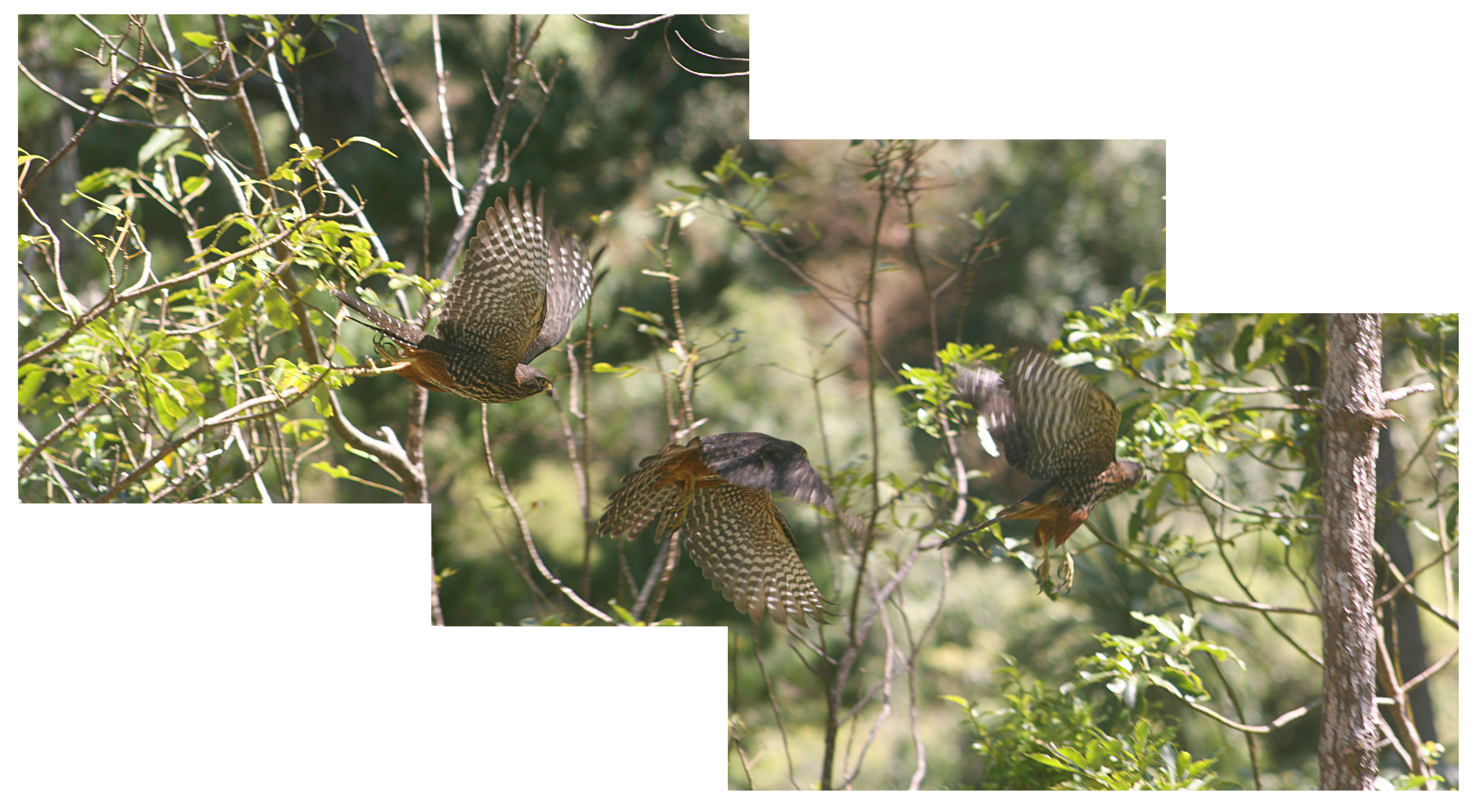
New Zealand falcon in various phases of flight

== Gallery ==
New Zealand falcon / kārearea

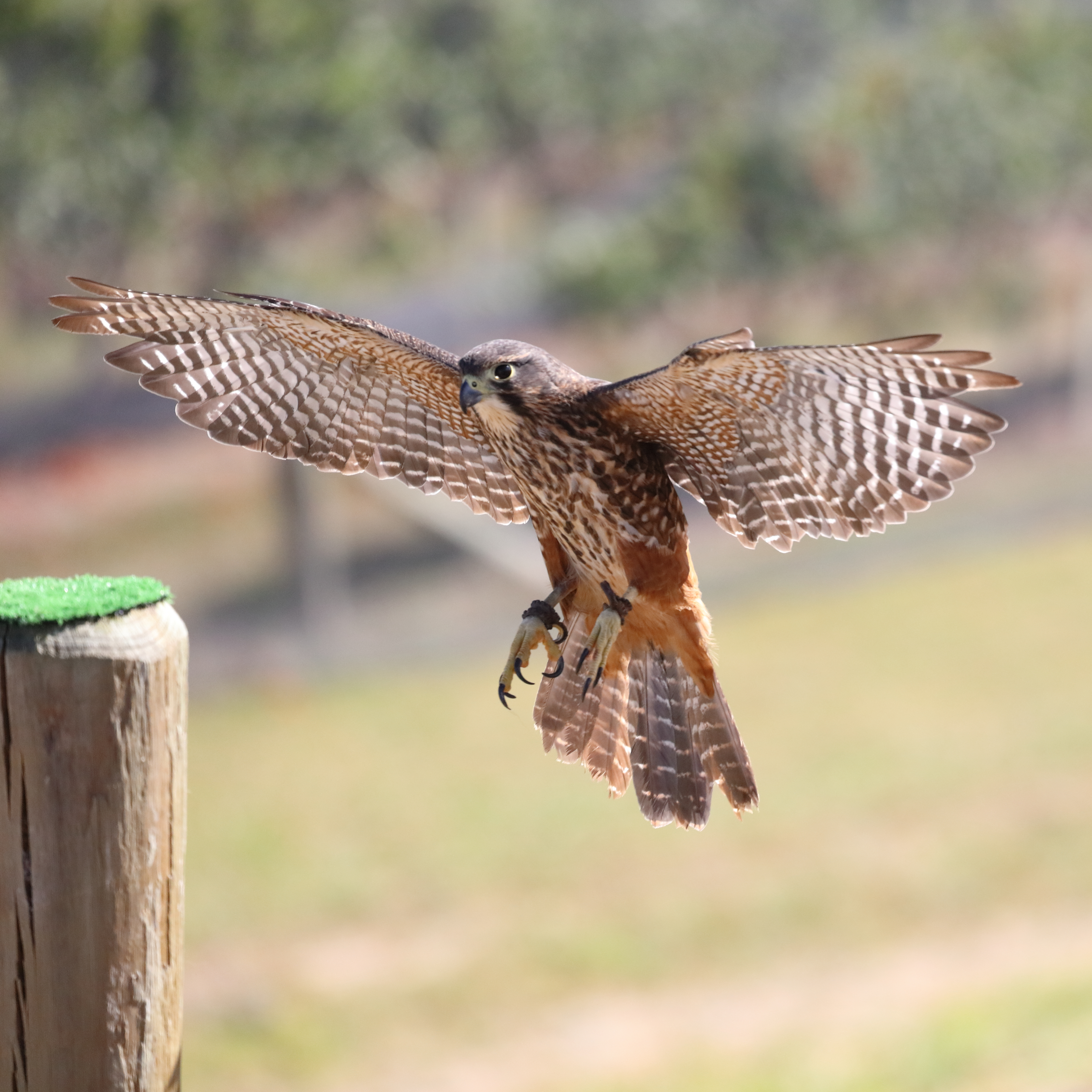

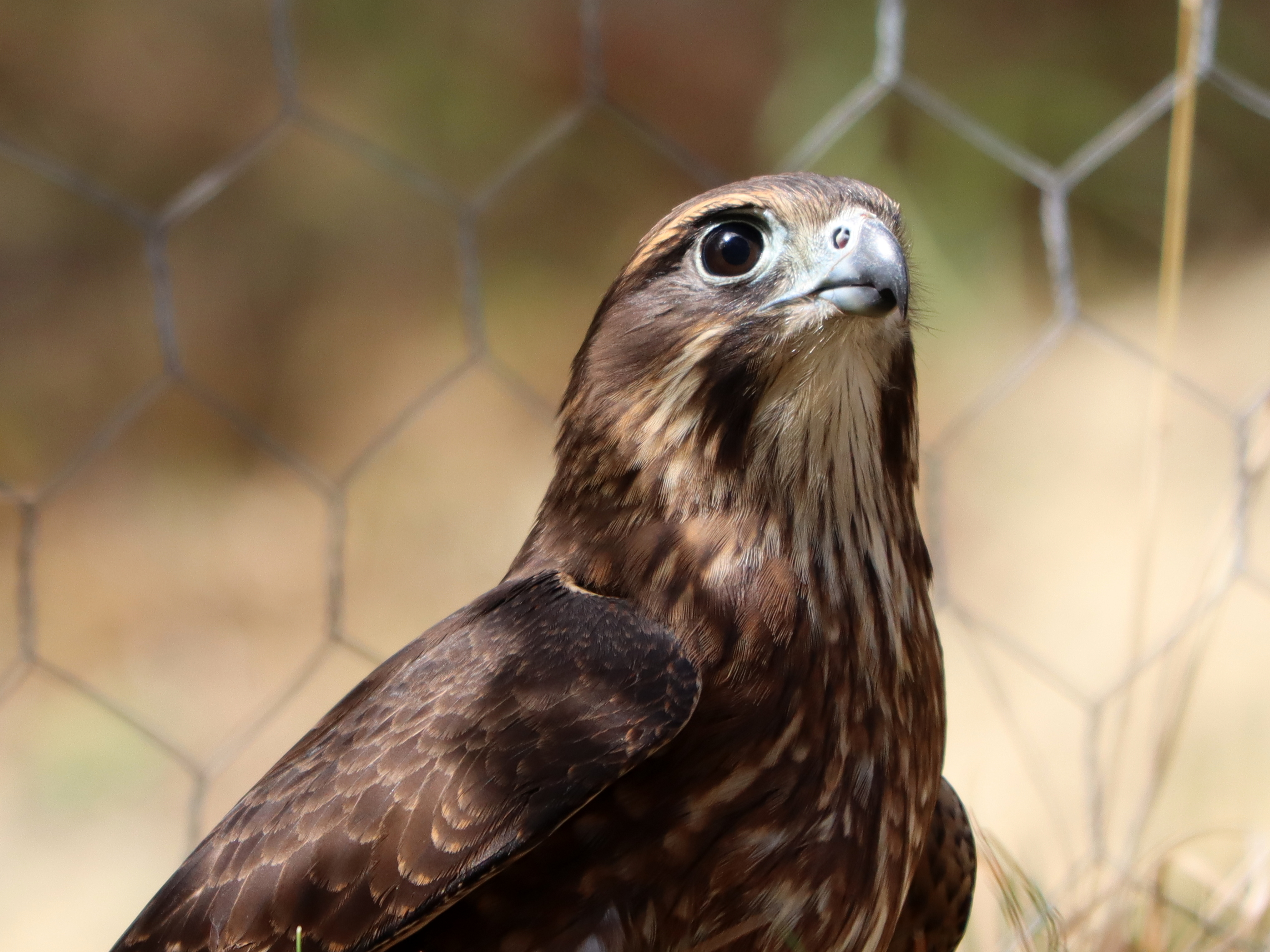

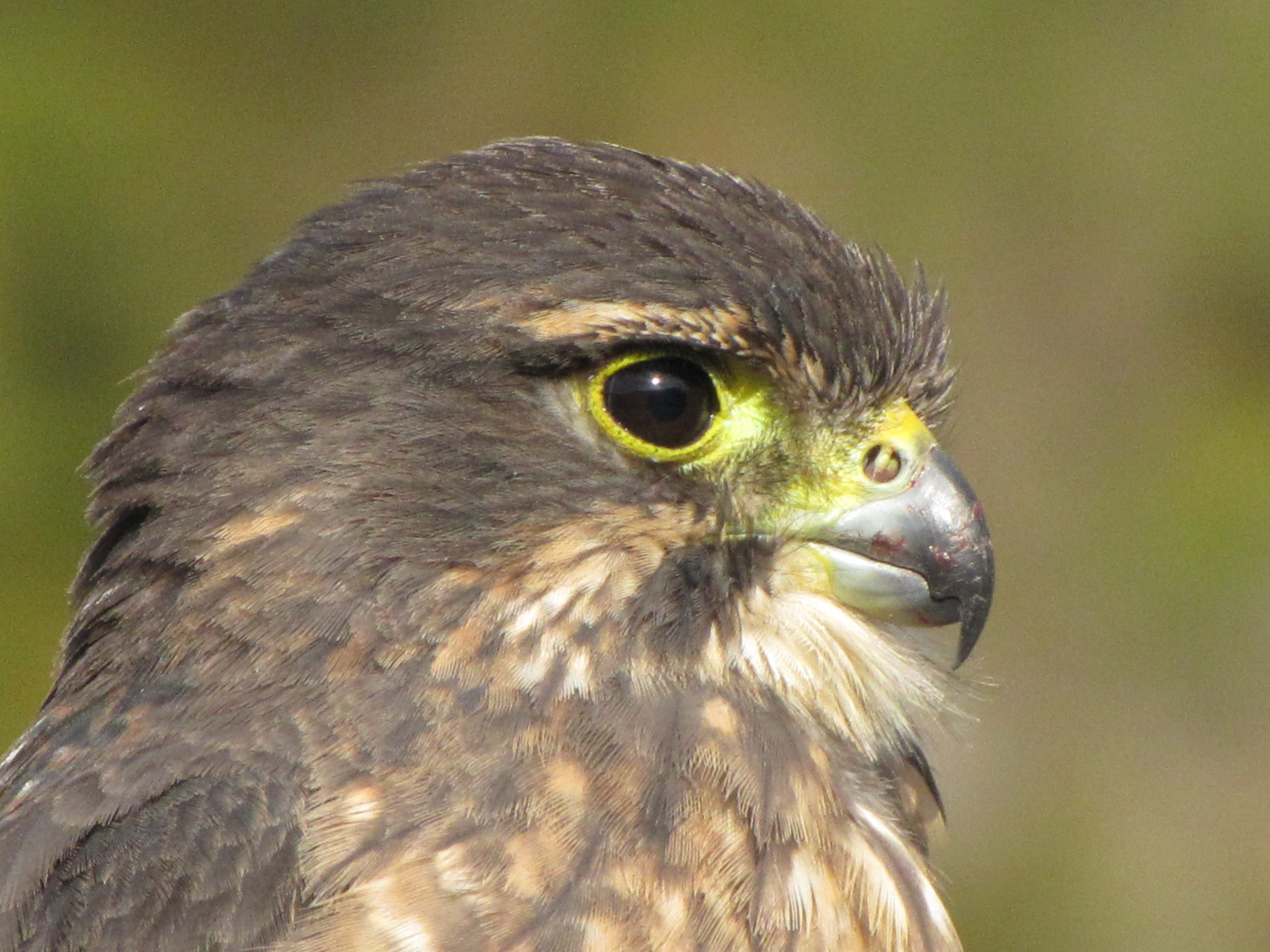

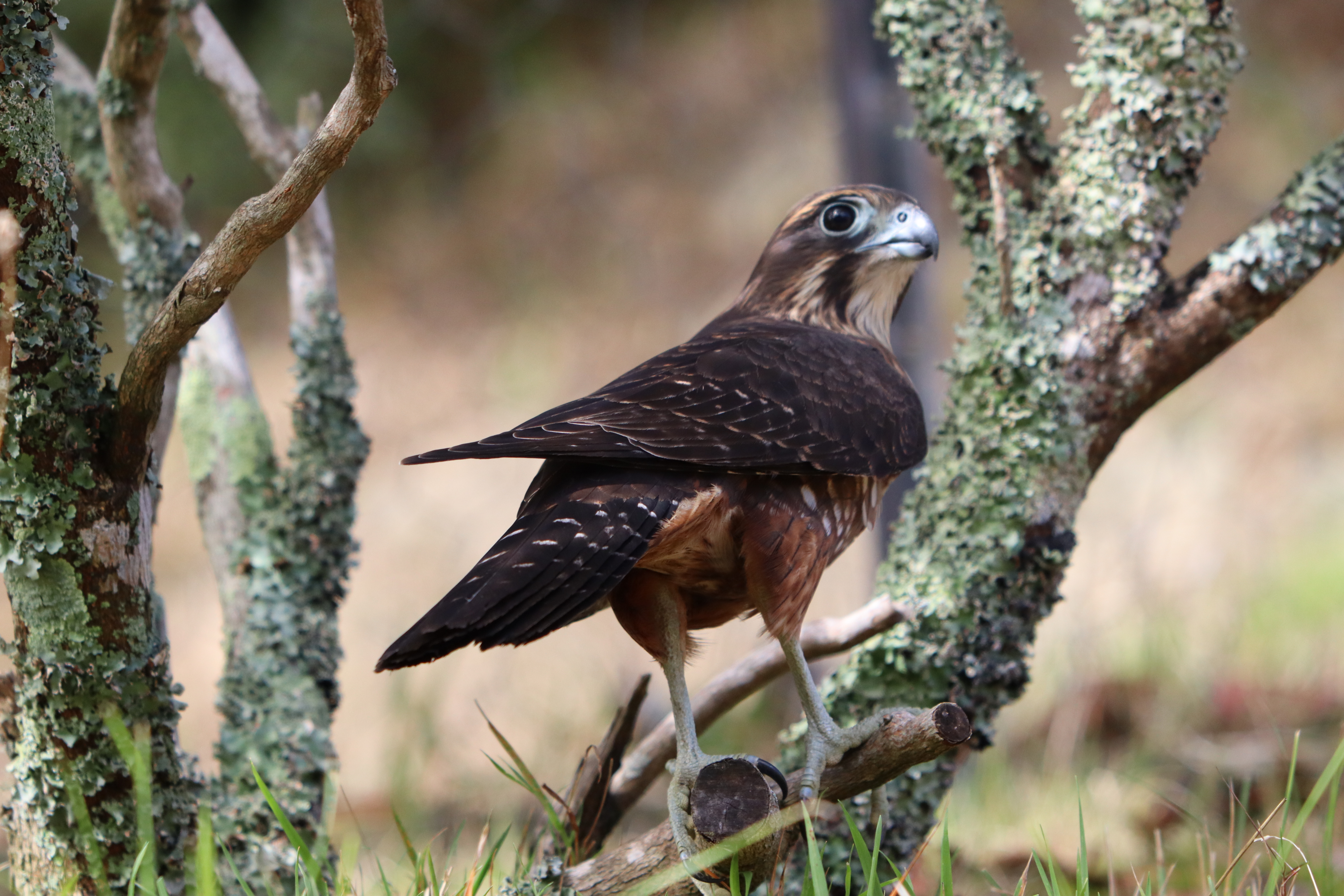

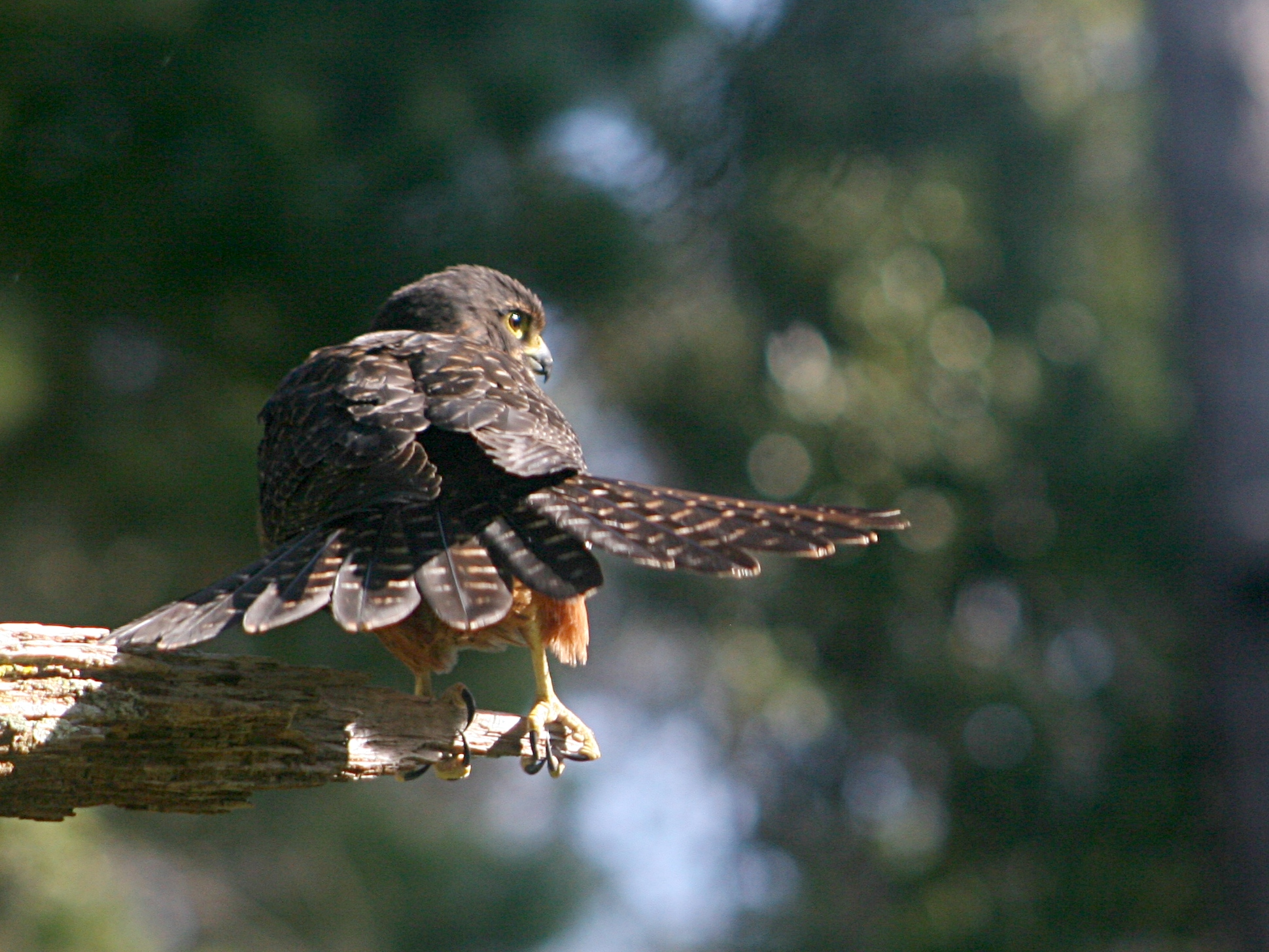

== See also ==
- Wingspan National Bird of Prey Centre

== Cited sources ==
- Marchant, S.; Higgins, P.J., eds. (1993). "Falco novaeseelandiae New Zealand Falcon" ( (PDF)). Handbook of Australian, New Zealand & Antarctic Birds. Vol. 2, Raptors to lapwings. Melbourne, Victoria: Oxford University Press. pp. 279–291. ISBN 978-0-19-553069-8. Archived from the original on 21 February 2024.
