= World Center for Birds of Prey =

US-based non-profit organization

The Peregrine Fund's World Center for Birds of Prey
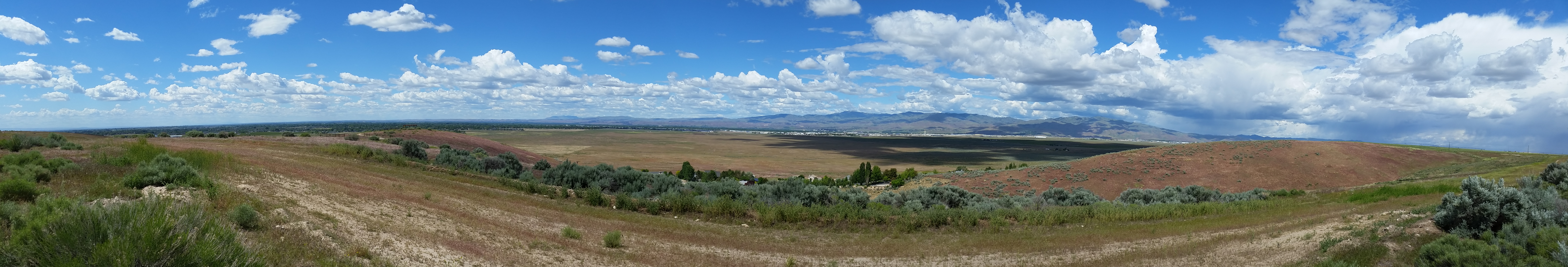
- Panorama of World Center for Birds of Prey, May 2017
- Established: 1984; 42 years ago
- Location: 5668 W. Flying Hawk Lane; Boise, Idaho, U.S.
- Coordinates: 43.517°N 116.256°W
- Visitors: 50,000 / yr.
- President: Richard T. Watson
- Website: peregrinefund.org

Location in the United States

The World Center for Birds of Prey in Boise, Idaho, is the headquarters for The Peregrine Fund, an international non-profit organization founded in 1970 that conserves endangered raptors around the world.

Built 42 years ago in 1984, the World Center for Birds of Prey is located on 580 acres (2.3 km^{2}) on a hilltop overlooking Boise, south of the airport and east of Kuna. The campus consists of the business offices of The Peregrine Fund, breeding facilities for endangered raptors, the Velma Morrison Interpretive Center, and the Herrick Collections Building, which houses a large research library and the Archives of Falconry.

The Peregrine Fund is known for its worldwide conservation and recovery efforts of rare and endangered raptors. The organization's first recovery effort focused on the peregrine falcon, which was facing extinction due to the widespread use of the chemical DDT. The peregrine falcon was removed from the U.S. Endangered Species list in 1999 at an international celebration held in Boise.

== History ==
The Peregrine Fund's original breeding facilities were established at Cornell University in central New York state in 1970 and at a Colorado Division of Wildlife facility in Fort Collins in 1974. They were moved to Boise after the organization established the World Center for Birds of Prey in 1984. Morley Nelson of Boise, a well-known raptor expert and member of The Peregrine Fund board of directors, was instrumental in bringing the organization to his hometown.

The first buildings at the new site were an office for The Peregrine Fund administration and barns for the captive breeding program. The organization's first climate-controlled breeding barn (the Gerald D. and Kathryn Swim Herrick Tropical Raptor Building) was constructed in 1986. In 1992, the Velma Morrison Interpretive Center opened to the public with exhibits of rare and endangered raptors, interactive displays, and outreach programs for schools and other groups.

In 1993, the first of three California condor breeding barns was constructed. The Gerald D. and Kathryn S. Herrick Collections Building opened in 2002 with space for The Peregrine Fund's research library, scientific specimen collections, and the Archives of Falconry.

== Research and captive breeding ==
The center's research facilities are designed to enhance the health, reproduction, and reintroduction efforts of endangered species and to collect information about the general biology of raptors. The science is focused on understanding how diet, aging and environment affect the health, growth, reproduction and lifespan of the birds. The propagation program played a critical role in the successful recovery of the peregrine falcon.

The organization currently breeds the endangered California condor and aplomado falcon at the World Center for Birds of Prey. The condors are released to the wild in northern Arizona and southern Utah; aplomado falcon chicks are released to the wild in Texas and New Mexico. Captive birds in the breeding facility are monitored by video, which allows the collection of detailed behavioral information. Studies on disease, contaminants, nutrition and genetics help biologists evaluate problems facing birds in the wild.

== Velma Morrison Interpretive Center ==
The Peregrine Fund made the world of raptors more accessible to the public at the Velma Morrison-Knudsen Interpretive Center, established in 1992. The facility features interactive displays, multi-media shows and live demonstrations with hawks, falcons, eagles and owls. Visitors may observe a live California condor and other birds of prey. The environmental education program has three components: general public, school-endorsed programs, and outreach. All three use live raptors as an avenue for promoting conservation of birds of prey and their habitat. The interpretive center draws approximately 30,000 visitors annually. Velma Morrison (1920–2013) was the second wife and widow of Harry Morrison (1885–1971), co-founder of Morrison-Knudsen Corporation.

== Library and archives ==
Completed in 2002, the Gerald D. and Kathryn S. Herrick Collections Building provides space for The Peregrine Fund's research library, scientific specimen collections, and the Archives of Falconry. The research library collections include more than 20,000 books and monographs and full or partial runs of more than 1,400 technical journals and conservation magazines, newsletters, videos, CDs and maps. The library's Global Raptor Information Network (GRIN) is an online service that provides encyclopedia-style species accounts of diurnal hawks, eagles and falcons, connects raptor researchers and conservation organizations through a global communications network, and posts information on research findings and raptor conservation issues. The library's specimen collections include more than 13,000 eggshells and nearly 300 avian study skins for use by researchers.

The Archives of Falconry includes falconry equipment and memorabilia, artwork, field notes, and a substantial media collection on the ancient sport of falconry. The Archives of Falconry's library consists of 2,000 books on falconry, including some originals dating to 1495. The archives doubled in size in 2006 with a 3,000-square-foot (280 m^{2}) addition donated by His Highness Sheikh Mohamed bin Zayed to honor his father, the founding president of the United Arab Emirates. The new wing displays an authentic Arab tent, memorabilia, and displays related to the ancient tradition of Middle Eastern falconry.
