= The Peregrine Fund =

U.S. non-profit organization

The Peregrine Fund (named after the bird of prey of the same name the peregrine falcon) is a non-profit organization founded in 1970 that conserves threatened and endangered birds of prey worldwide. The successful recovery of the peregrine falcon in the United States, which was removed from the U.S. Endangered Species List in 1999, enabled the organization to expand its mission to include other endangered raptors around the world. The Peregrine Fund is headquartered at its World Center for Birds of Prey in Boise, Idaho, on a 580-acre (2.3 km^{2}) campus with breeding and research facilities, an administrative office, interpretive center, research library, and archives.

== Mission ==
The Peregrine Fund's mission is to restore rare species through captive breeding and release, improve capacity for local conservation, conduct scientific research and environmental education, and conserve habitat. It currently is involved in recovery of the California condor and Aplomado Falcon, and research on American Kestrels and Gyrfalcons in the United States and a variety of raptors in Central America, South America, West Indies, Madagascar, Asia, East Africa, Australia, and the Philippines. Conservation efforts have been extended to more than 100 species in 70 countries.

== Approach ==
The Peregrine Fund is a non-political, science-based, project-driven conservation organization. It works in partnership with local conservation groups and local, state and national governments on its recovery projects. It also partners with students by supporting their education in raptor biology and other scientific fields and has trained, mentored, and supported over 100 students to increase local capacity for conservation science. The organization receives funds from foundation and government grants, memberships and individual donations for bird recovery programs. An endowment fund pays administrative and development costs. As a result, 96 per cent of donations go directly to programs. The organization has 33-member, multi-national board of directors representing business, science and conservation.

== History ==
In 1965, at The first Peregrine Conference, biologists concluded that the peregrine falcon was in serious decline around the world. Concerned enthusiasts in the sport of falconry believed that breeding falcons in captivity would be a way to keep the species alive if the wild birds became extinct. After a second meeting at Cornell University in 1969, the governments of the United States, Canada, and Mexico were asked to protect the remaining populations of peregrine falcons. The U.S. Department of Interior listed the falcon as endangered in 1970. The pesticide DDT, which caused the birds' eggshells to become thin and break, was banned for domestic use in the United States in 1972. The falcon remained on the list of endangered species when the Endangered Species Act was adopted by Congress in 1973.

Ornithology professor Tom Cade founded The Peregrine Fund at Cornell University in 1970 to breed the falcons in captivity and release them to the wild. In 1974 a second breeding operation was begun in Fort Collins, Colorado, managed by Bill Burnham, who went on to become president of The Peregrine Fund for 23 years. Both operations relocated to Boise, Idaho after the World Center for Birds of Prey was established in 1984. The Peregrine Fund bred and released more than 4,000 falcons from 1974 to 1997. In 1985, The Peregrine Fund held an international conference on the 20th anniversary of the first Peregrine Conference to celebrate the survival and growing recovery of the falcon population and to assess its global status.

Since 1970, The Peregrine Fund has hatched and raised 20 species of rare birds and pioneered propagation and releasing techniques for numerous species. Species systematically released to the wild to develop techniques or restore wild populations include the Aplomado falcon, bald eagle, bat falcon, California condor, harpy eagle, Madagascar fish eagle, Mauritius kestrel, orange-breasted falcon, and prairie falcon. Overall, the organization has monitored, surveyed and worked with more than 100 raptor species in the wild around the world.

== U.S. programs ==
The Peregrine Fund currently has two recovery projects in the United States: The Aplomado falcon in Texas and the California condor in northern Arizona. Aplomado falcons were once widespread in the American Southwest but habitat changes, pesticides and human persecution restricted their range to a few areas in Mexico by the 1950s. The Peregrine Fund began breeding the falcons and releasing them in Texas in 1993. With a substantial population of falcons established in South Texas, the focus then shifted to West Texas. In 2002 Aplomado falcons were released on several private ranches and in 2007, biologists observed the fledging of wild falcons in West Texas for the first time in more than 70 years.

California condors were close to extinction in the 1980s when an effort began to capture the last birds in existence, numbering 22 in 1981. Condor pairs have produced more than 100 offspring at the Boise breeding facility. By 1996 there were enough young condors to begin establishing a recovery effort in Arizona (one was already underway in California). The goal of the recovery plan is to establish two geographically separate populations, each with at least 150 condors and 15 breeding pairs. When chicks are ready to fledge, they are transported from the breeding facility in Idaho to the release site in Arizona. These condors produced their first wild offspring by 2003. The future success of the program is jeopardized by lead poisoning from carcasses and gut piles left in the field by shooters using lead ammunition, which fragments into hundreds of tiny pieces upon impact. The Peregrine Fund currently is researching the amount of lead contained in hunter-killed game animals.

== International programs ==
The Neotropical Raptor Conservation Program is part of The Peregrine Fund's international projects. Raptor projects include the harpy eagle and orange-breasted falcon. Since 1998, more than 40 harpy eagles have been hatched in captivity and released to the wild in Panama and Belize. In 2007, rare orange-breasted falcons bred in captivity were released for the first time to the wild in their traditional territory in Belize. The organization has worked with more than 35 raptor species in the wild in this part of the world.

The West Indies Project focuses on raptors found only in the Caribbean Islands. Current research and conservation efforts are directed at the critically endangered Ridgway's hawk in the Dominican Republic, the Puerto Rican Sharp-shinned Hawk, the Grenada hook-billed kite confined to the island of Grenada, and the Cuban kite, endemic to Cuba and among the rarest species of raptor in the world.

The Pan Africa Raptor Conservation Program is designed to help stem the loss of biodiversity in Africa. Many species threatened by habitat loss have been surveyed, including the Cape vulture and Taita falcon in southern Africa and the African fish eagle, augur buzzard, Sokoke scops owl, Pemba scops owl, Ruppell's vulture, African white-backed vulture, and crowned eagle in several nations in East Africa. The Peregrine Fund has biologists and field workers in Madagascar, an island off the east coast of Africa with vast biological diversity. In 2006, they re-discovered the Madagascar pochard, a diving duck thought to be extinct, while searching for Malagasy harriers. The Peregrine Fund also re-discovered the Madagascar serpent eagle and red owl in 1993, both long thought to be extinct, and helped create Madagascar's largest rainforest reserve in 1997. In 2015, the Fund's Malagasy biologists successfully protected three new areas, a total of more than 190,000 hectares, that have been added to the country's national park system and will be managed by and for local people to benefit many endangered species.

The Asia Pacific Raptor Conservation Program focuses on raptors on islands between Southeast Asia and Australia. The Peregrine Fund provides student support, training and guidance in the study of the breeding behavior and ecology of the New Guinea harpy eagle. The organization also assists the Philippine Eagle Foundation in conserving and study the eagle and other raptors on islands that make up the Republic of the Philippines.

The Asian Vulture Crisis Project addresses declining vulture populations on the Indian subcontinent. Over the last decade, populations of at least three species, the Oriental white-backed, long-billed, and slender-billed vultures, have become critically endangered. Peregrine Fund research published in the journal Nature determined that poisoning from the residues of diclofenac in the carcasses of livestock that had been treated with the drug for veterinary purposes was responsible for the catastrophic die-off. India, Pakistan, and Nepal banned the drug in 2006.
