= Wingspan National Bird of Prey Centre =

New Zealand bird of prey and visitor centre

Coordinates: 38.0906°S 176.1958°E

Wingspan, Rotorua
- Wingspan National Bird of Prey Centre
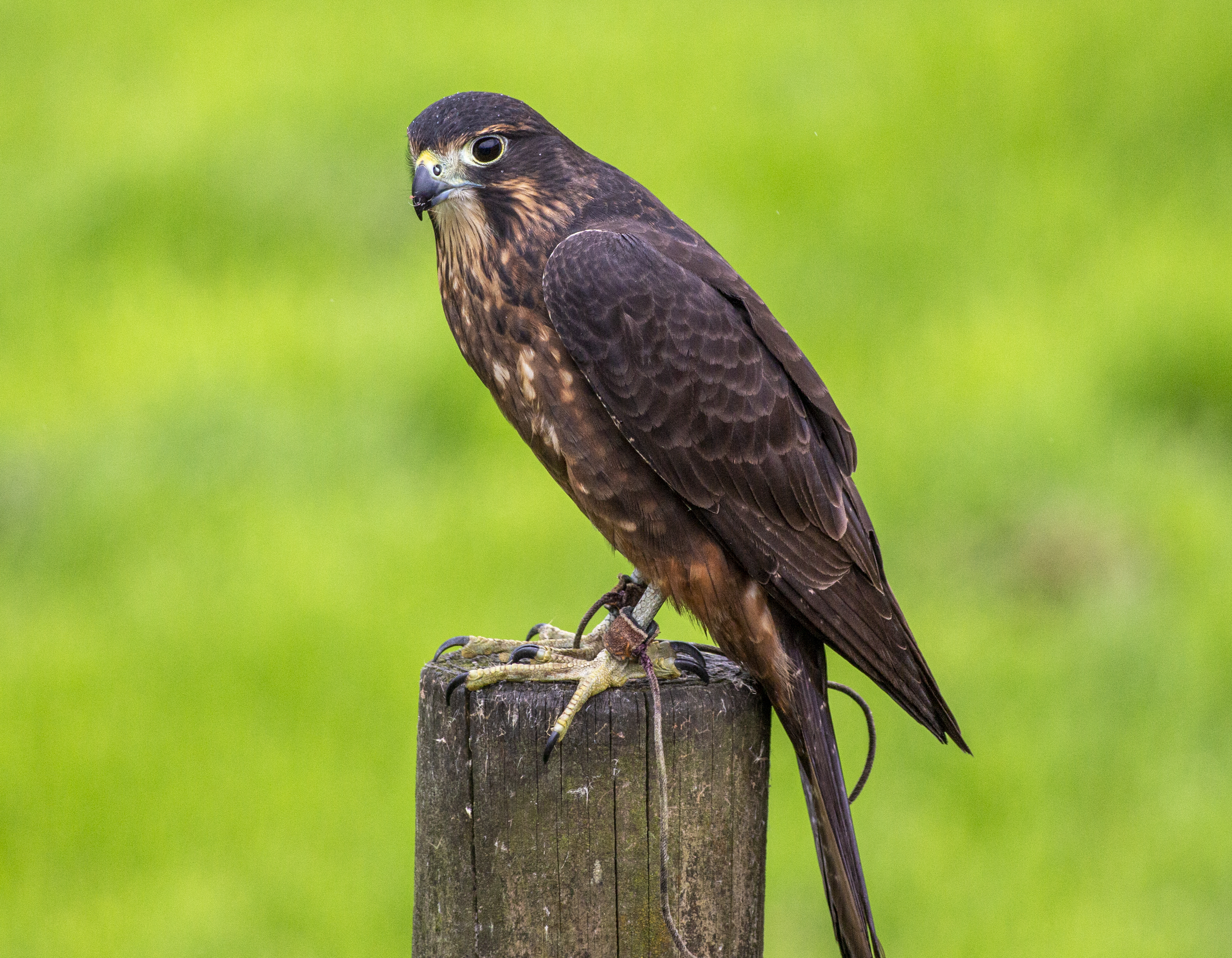
- Kārearea in falconry demonstration at Wingspan
- Formation: 1992
- Type: Charitable Trust
- Purpose: Conservation
- Headquarters: Rotorua
- Location: Rotorua, New Zealand
- Executive Director: Debbie Stewart
- Key people: Noel Hyde, falconer and trustee
- Website: www.wingspan.co.nz

Wingspan National Bird of Prey Centre (Wingspan) is a captive breeding facility and visitor centre located on the slopes of Mount Ngongotahā in the Ngongotahā Valley in New Zealand's Rotorua district. Wingspan undertakes conservation, education and research activities related to birds of prey found in New Zealand, and provides demonstrations of falconry.

== Wingspan – Birds of Prey Trust ==
The Wingspan National Bird of Prey Centre is operated by the Wingspan – Birds of Prey Trust. The Executive Director (as at 2021) is Debbie Stewart. One of the trustees is Noel Hyde, who is a falconer and a taxidermist at the centre.

The objectives of the Wingspan – Birds of Prey Trust, as set out in their trust deed include:

(a) the advancement of education in the community and to increase public awareness of New Zealand species of birds of prey through close contact with live birds, demonstrations, talks, promotional campaigns, posters, brochures and media involvement.

(b) To provide rehabilitation for sick, injured or orphaned raptors forwarded to the Trust by the public, SPCA, Department of Conservation, Veterinary Clinics, Auckland Bird Rescue and Zoological Gardens for the benefit of the community.

(c) To study the behaviour and breeding of captive birds, monitor populations and to evaluate and investigate appropriate programmes to help preserve and maintain birds of prey for the benefit of the community.

== History ==
The Wingspan – Birds of Prey Trust Charitable Trust was registered on 18 June 1992.

In 2010, Noel Hyde obtained the first permit for falconry in New Zealand, and this subsequently led to the New Zealand Falconers Association being established. A few of the birds at Wingspan are trained using falconry skills, to enable demonstrations for visitors.

The founder, Debbie Stewart, was made a member of the New Zealand Order of Merit in 2013 for services to conservation. Noel Hyde was also recognised with an MNZM in 2018.

In 2016, as part of its fifth series of banknotes, the Reserve Bank of New Zealand issued a new $20 note with a kārearea on one side of the note. The image is of a kārearea named Atareta, from Wingspan.

In 2017, Wingspan announced that after forming a partnership with Ngāti Whakaue Tribal Lands, they would relocate their operations to a new facility a short distance along Paradise Valley Road, on the slopes of Mount Ngongotahā. The new facility will be used for rehabilitation, education, research and breeding. In March 2022, Debbie Stewart said that the trust was waiting to secure the final funding for the project.

Wingspan celebrated 30 years as a charitable trust in November 2022. During that time it had provided around 5,000 flight demonstrations, and helped almost 1,000 birds. In January 2023, Wingspan announced that following confirmation of grant funding, construction of the new centre would commence in April. One feature of the new centre will be a waharoa (gateway), that includes an artwork made from thousands of aluminium feathers.

== Conservation ==
Wingspan focusses on New Zealand raptors, or birds of prey, including the New Zealand falcon (Māori: kārearea), morepork (Māori: ruru) and the swamp harrier (Māori: kahu) – New Zealand's largest bird of prey. It has approval from the Department of Conservation to care for sick, injured and orphaned raptors. Visitors to Wingspan get the opportunity to get up close to these birds in aviaries, and to see demonstrations of falconry, where trained birds fly free.

=== Rearing endangered species ===
Kārearea (New Zealand falcon) are a threatened species that is unique to New Zealand, with an estimated population of 10,000 in the wild. This makes them rarer than kiwi. Wingspan has a captive breeding programme for kārearea, and has commenced a project in partnership between Wingspan and Rotorua Museum, to release kārearea into urban areas. The first breeding success from the urban release programme was reported in 2015, when a chick was raised by a pair of falcons in the Whakarewarewa forest. In 2016, Wingspan recovered two eggs from a nest in a recently replanted area of the Whakarawarawa Forest. The nest was at risk because it was close to a recreational area. The eggs were taken to the Wingspan facility for incubation before the chicks were returned to the nest.

One of the falcon chicks released at the Rotorua museum was a male named Hatupatu. He was bred in captivity at Wingspan from permanently injured falcons, and hatched in November 2013. He lived to age seven, and was regularly seen in the area of the Rotorua Government Gardens. He fathered 13 chicks.

As part of Wingspan's work with other species, a hand-raised Ruru (morepork) named Whisper was a foster mother for many eggs recovered from abandoned nests in the wild.

=== Monitoring wild populations ===
Wingspan has been monitoring the populations of kārearea since 1992, with a particular focus on Kaingaroa forest in the central North Island where there are approximately 40 breeding pairs. Through their monitoring of New Zealand falcons in commercial forestry blocks, Wingspan has found that:

The rotation and mosaic of different aged stands, along with cut overs left after harvesting mature trees, promote amazing biodiversity, including small birds which attracts and provide ample food for falcons.

=== Bird rescue ===
Wingspan is a bird rescue facility, and rehabilitates injured birds of prey for later release. Most of the kārearea brought to the bird rescue service at Wingspan have been injured by gunshot. Wingspan uses a polystyrene model aircraft that looks like a magpie as a flight training aid. They rehabilitate injured falcons by encouraging them to chase the model as if it were prey, and build their fitness prior to release into the wild.

In 2015, Wingspan took in an injured Australasian bittern. Although this is not a bird of prey, it was taken in by Wingspan because it is an endangered bird, with a national population estimated to be less than 1,000.

=== Eastern barn owls ===
Eastern barn owls have self-introduced to New Zealand. The first nest was discovered in 2008, and there is now a small but growing population. Wingspan has been gathering reports of Eastern barn owl sightings, to help understand the size of the population and their potential impact on other species. Eastern Barn owls are kept in their aviaries, and are used in flight training.

== Education and tourism ==
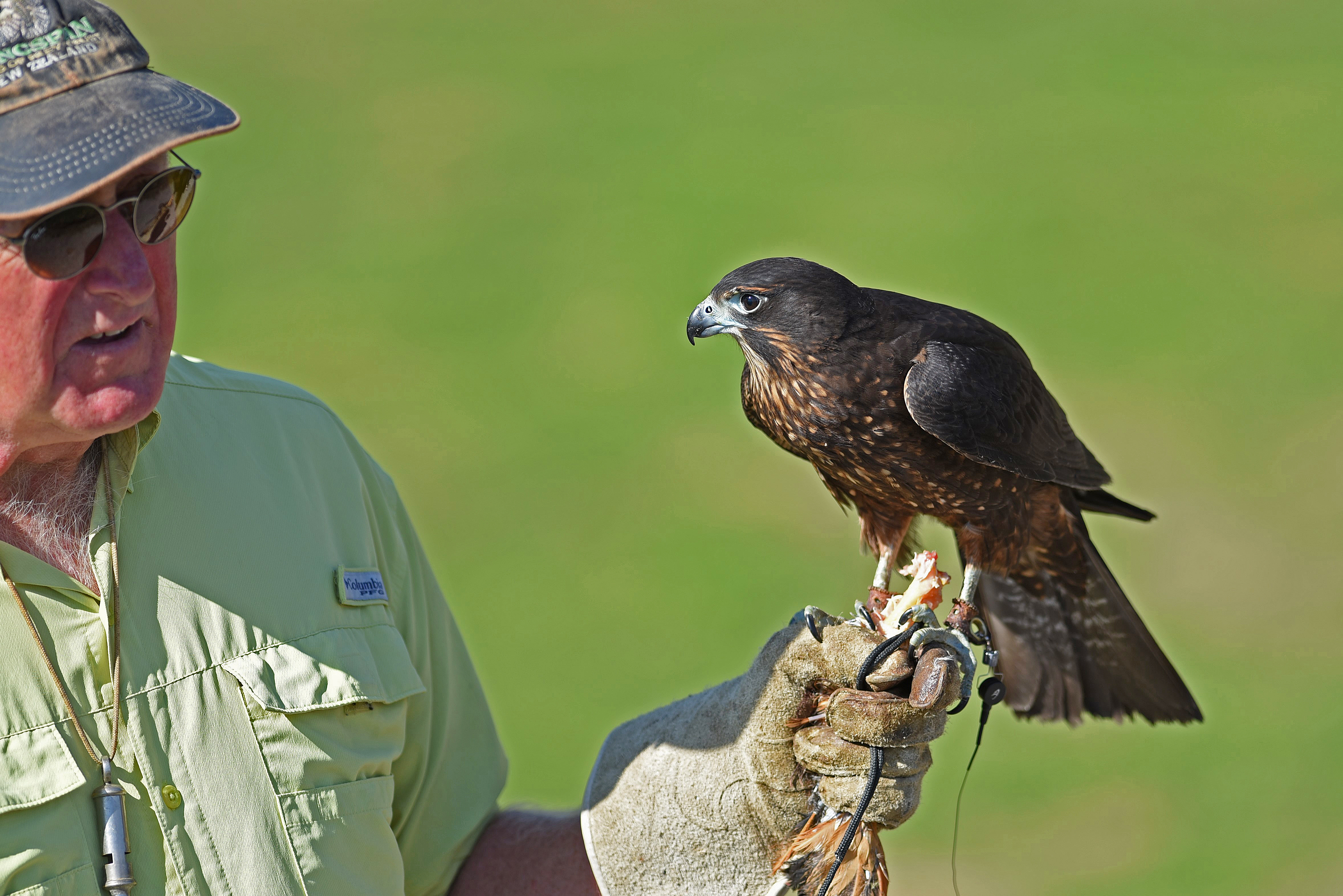
Kārearea at Wingspan Bird of Prey Centre

Many schools visit the centre. In 2018, the Wingspan falconer Noel Hyde estimated that since the centre opened, more than 60,000 children had held a falcon on their gloved hand.

The Wingspan centre is a popular tourist attraction in the Rotorua area, and provides visitor experiences including demonstrations of traditional falconry skills. Wingspan gets approximately 20,000 visitors per year (as at 2017), but forecasts that future visitor numbers could reach 100,000.

== Awards ==
In the 2014 Westpac Rotorua Business Excellence Awards, Wingspan won the Community Organisation Business Award.

== See also ==
- New Zealand falcon (Kārearea)
- Swamp Harrier (Kahu)
- Morepork (Ruru)
