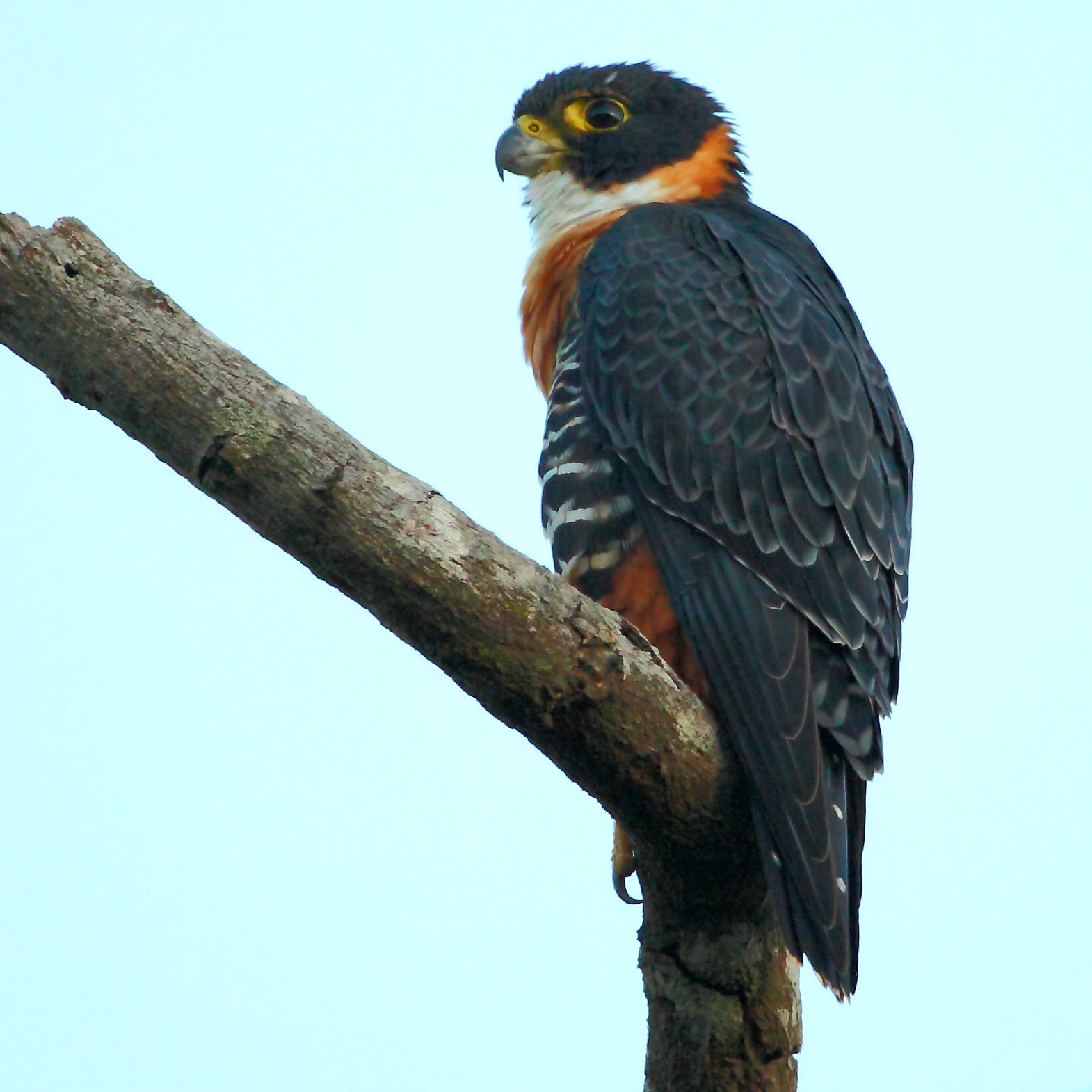
- at Chapada dos Guimarães, Mato Grosso State, Brazil

Conservation status
- Near Threatened (IUCN 3.1)

Scientific classification
- Kingdom: Animalia
- Phylum: Chordata
- Class: Aves
- Order: Falconiformes
- Family: Falconidae
- Genus: Falco
- Species: F. deiroleucus

Binomial name
- Falco deiroleucus Temminck, 1825

= Orange-breasted falcon =

Species of bird

The orange-breasted falcon (Falco deiroleucus) is a bird of prey in the family Falconidae, the falcons and caracaras. It is found in southern Mexico, Belize, Guatemala, Panama, and in all South American countries except Chile and Uruguay, though in Argentina only in the far northwest. Despite its wide range, it is scarce, and considered by IUCN to be Near Threatened.

== Taxonomy and systematics ==
The orange-breasted falcon looks like a larger version of the bat falcon (F. rufigularis) with which it can easily be mistaken. They share plumage and vocal characteristics and are sister species. These two had been thought to be closely related to the aplomado falcon (F. femoralis), but more recent genetic evidence shows they are more closely related to the Old World hobbies than to any other New World falcon.

The orange-breasted falcon is monotypic.

== Description ==
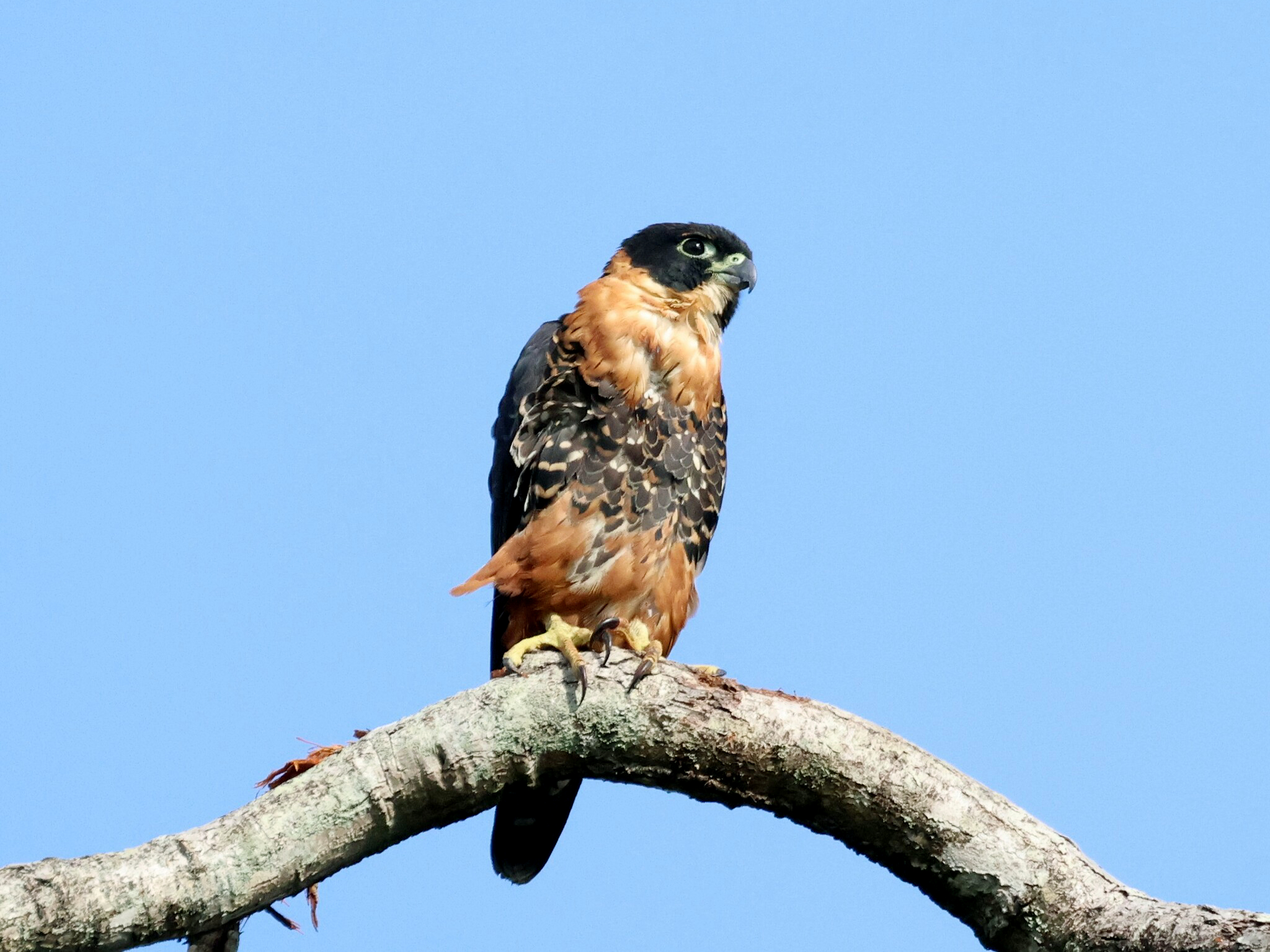
Adult in Georgetown, Guyana

Male orange-breasted falcons are 35 to 36 cm (14 to 14 in) long and weigh 325 to 425 g (11 to 15 oz). Females are 38 to 40 cm (15 to 16 in) long and weigh 550 to 700 g (19 to 25 oz). Of all the falcons, this species has the greatest difference in size between the sexes. It is a rather husky, large-headed bird. The sexes have similar plumage, and the species resembles the smaller bat falcon. Adults have a black head and bluish black upperparts with paler blue-gray edge on the feathers. Their throat and sides of the neck are white and their upper breast is buffy rufous orange that also extends onto the sides of the neck. The ratio of white to orange varies among individuals. Their lower breast is black with coarse reddish brown bars, somewhat lighter on the flanks. Their belly, thighs, and undertail coverts are the same buffy rufous orange as the upper breast. Their cere, the bare skin around the eye, and their legs and feet are usually bright yellow, but may be pale yellow to dull bluish green. Their iris is dark brown. Immatures are paler and less sharply marked than adults. Their back and tail are dark brownish, their underparts mostly pale buffy with dark brown barring on the breast. Their bare parts are dull bluish green that become more yellow with age. Identification from bat falcon is difficult, as small male orange-breasted falcons are only marginally larger than large female bat falcons; however, as its name suggests, orange-breasted falcon has an orange band on the upper breast above the black chest, whereas adult bat falcon is white with no or only very limited orange on the breast. Juveniles are even more difficult, as the upper breast is buffy-colored in both species; these are best distinguished by black spotting on the leg feathers of juvenile orange-breasted falcon, while juvenile bat falcon has the same orange-red leg feathers as adults.

== Distribution and habitat ==
The orange-breasted falcon was formerly found from southern Mexico all the way to northern Argentina. Its range is now much reduced. The only fairly recent records in Middle America are from Belize, Guatemala, and Panama, though it might still be present in southern Mexico. It is extremely rare or extirpated in Costa Rica, Nicaragua, and Honduras. There are no records in El Salvador. The species is present though rare in Brazil, Ecuador, Peru, and Venezuela. Its status is uncertain in Bolivia, Colombia, Guyana, Paraguay, Suriname, and Trinidad and Tobago. Specimens exist from all of this last list of countries, and most are believed to have a few resident pairs. Except in a very few locations it is very sparsely distributed. Knowledge of its distribution is clouded by the species' resemblance to the much more widespread and populous bat falcon.

The orange-breasted falcon is dependent of tropical rain- and semi-deciduous forest with cliffs for nesting. It favors uninterrupted mature forest but also occurs in a mosaic landscape of forest and more open areas.

== Predation ==
Black-and-white hawk-eagles (Spizaetus melanoleucus) and stygian owls (Asio stygius) are known predators of the orange-breasted falcon in Belize. Black vultures (Coragyps atratus) occur throughout Middle and South America; their effect on the orange-breasted falcon appears to be through usurpation of nest sites. Falcon breeding success in a Guatemalan study was much greater at nests protected from Black Vultures. Africanized bees colonize the same type of cliffs as the falcons; no direct effects have been documented but the bees are known to affect other bird species.

There is a camera trap record of a vampire bat (Desmodontinae sp.) feeding on an incubating female orange-breasted falcon.

== Behavior ==
=== Movement ===
Orange-breasted falcon pairs occupy their territories year-round. Young disperse when independent but the distance typically traveled is not known.

=== Feeding ===
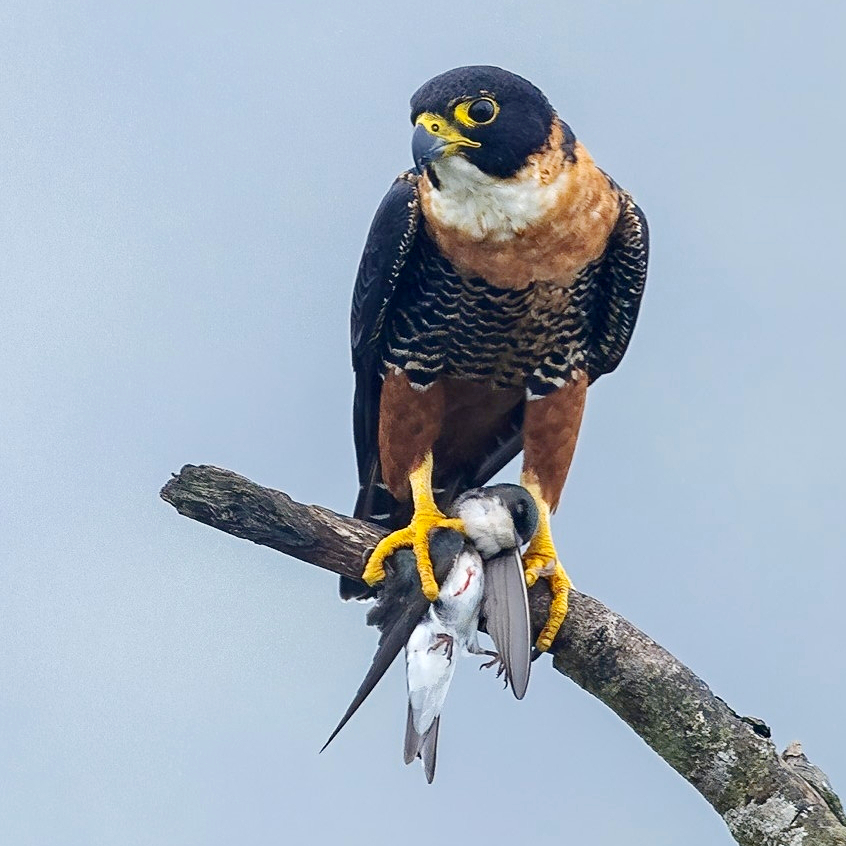
Adult with a tree swallow; Black Rock, Belize

The orange-breasted falcon preys on a very wide variety of birds and also bats. At least 45 species of birds, of 22 families, have been documented as prey in Belize and Guatemala, including killdeer, lesser yellowlegs, spotted sandpiper, pectoral sandpiper, scaled pigeon, mourning dove, ruddy ground dove, grey-headed dove, blue ground dove, ruddy quail dove, olive-throated parakeet, brown-hooded parrot, white-crowned parrot, pauraque, white collared swift, lesser swallow-tailed swift, citreoline trogon, violaceous trogon, slaty-tailed trogon, blue-crowned motmot, emerald touconet, acorn woodpecker, barred woodpecker, golden-olive woodpecker, eastern kingbird, rose-throated becard, masked tityra, black-crowned tityra, inca jay, Swainson's thrush, grey-breasted martin, Ridgway's rough-winged swallow, tropical mockingbird, red-legged honeycreeper, Botteri's sparrow, rose-breasted grosbeak, and melodious blackbird. It usually hunts above the forest canopy, either by diving from a cliff or dead treetop or by stooping from great height. "It also uses a stealth strategy for capturing migrating songbirds, shorebirds, and bats, by silhouetting them against the sky at dusk and dawn".

=== Breeding ===
The orange-breasted falcon's nest is a scrape or depression, usually on a cliff ledge or pothole, though a pair has nested on a temple in Guatemala's Tikal National Park. There are also a few records of nesting in detritus caught in the crotch of a large emergent tree. The clutch size is usually three eggs but can be two or four. The incubation period is about 30 to 34 days and fledging occurs about 40 to 45 days after hatch. The female does most of the incubating and provisioning of nestlings. The time to independence after fledging is not known.

=== Bathing ===
An orange-breasted falcon purposely crashed into leaves of trees with water gathered on them, apparently as a form of bathing.

=== Vocalization ===
Both sexes of the orange-breasted falcon are highly vocal when breeding. Their aggressive defense call is "a rapid-fire key-key-key-key...repeated over and over until the threat subsides". The call has also been described as "kyowh-kyowh-kyowh". Pairs utter soft chirps or piping sounds as part of courtship.

== Status ==
The IUCN has assessed the orange-breasted falcon as Near Threatened. Though it nominally has a large range, the species is sparsely distributed in it. Its population size is not known and is believed to be decreasing. Clearing of forest for timber, agriculture, and ranching is the principal threat. Black vultures and Africanized bees are known or suspected to affect nesting success.

The Peregrine Fund captive breeds orange-breasted falcons. Since 2007 the organization has bred and released 56 falcons into the wild in Belize. As of 2013, 23 had become independent and some have paired with wild bred birds and entered the local breeding population.
