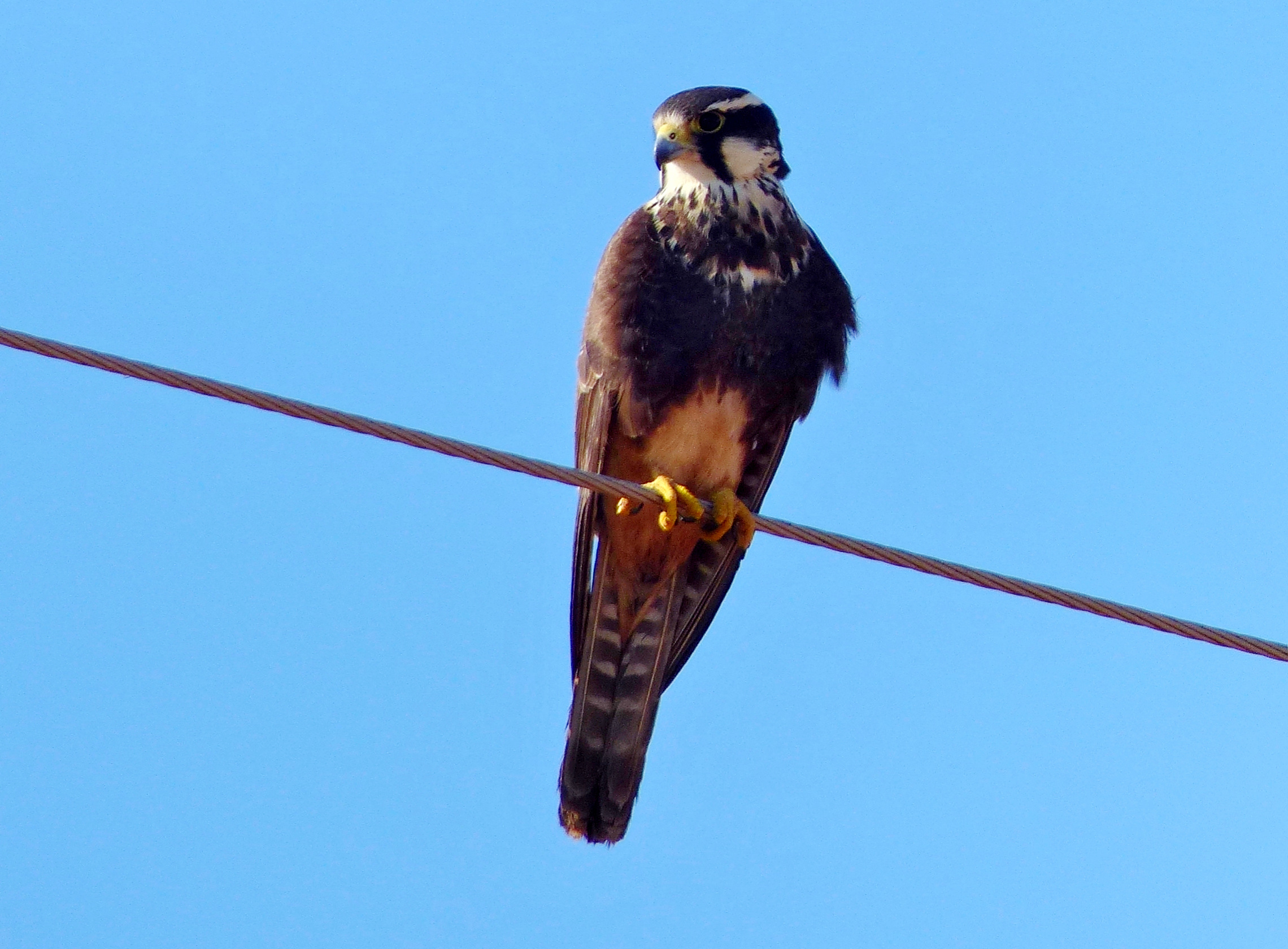
- Nominate F. f. femoralis at Transpantaneira, Poconé, Mato Grosso, Brazil

Conservation status
- Least Concern (IUCN 3.1)

Scientific classification
- Kingdom: Animalia
- Phylum: Chordata
- Class: Aves
- Order: Falconiformes
- Family: Falconidae
- Genus: Falco
- Species: F. femoralis

Binomial name
- Falco femoralis Temminck, 1822

Synonyms
- See text

= Aplomado falcon =

Species of bird

The aplomado falcon (Falco femoralis) is a medium-sized falcon of the Americas. The species' largest continuous range is in South America, but not in the deep interior Amazon Basin. It was long known as Falco fusco-coerulescens or Falco fuscocaerulescens, but these names are now believed to refer to the bat falcon (F. rufigularis). Its resemblance in shape to the hobbies accounts for its old name orange-chested hobby. Aplomado is an unusual Spanish word for "lead-colored", referring to the blue-grey areas of the plumage; an approximate English translation would be "plumbeous falcon". Spanish names for the species include halcón aplomado and halcón fajado (roughly "banded falcon", in reference to the characteristic pattern); in Brazil it is known as falcão-de-coleira (roughly "collared falcon", in reference to the white throat).

== Description ==
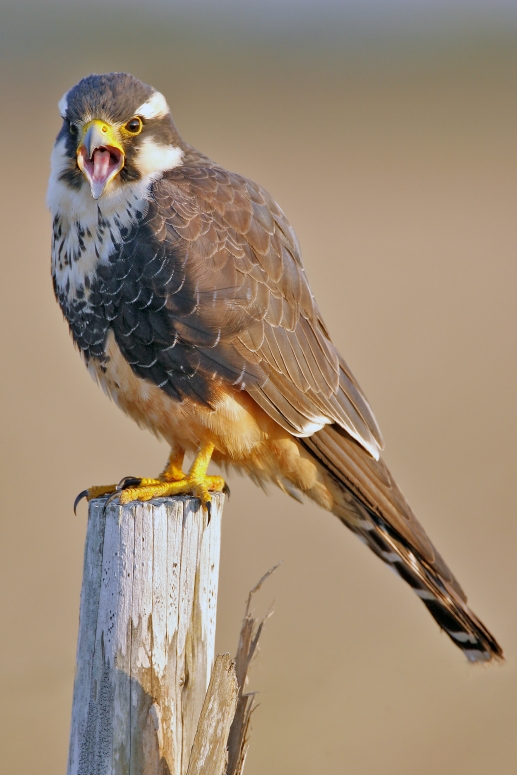
Reintroduced F. f. septentrionalis in Texas

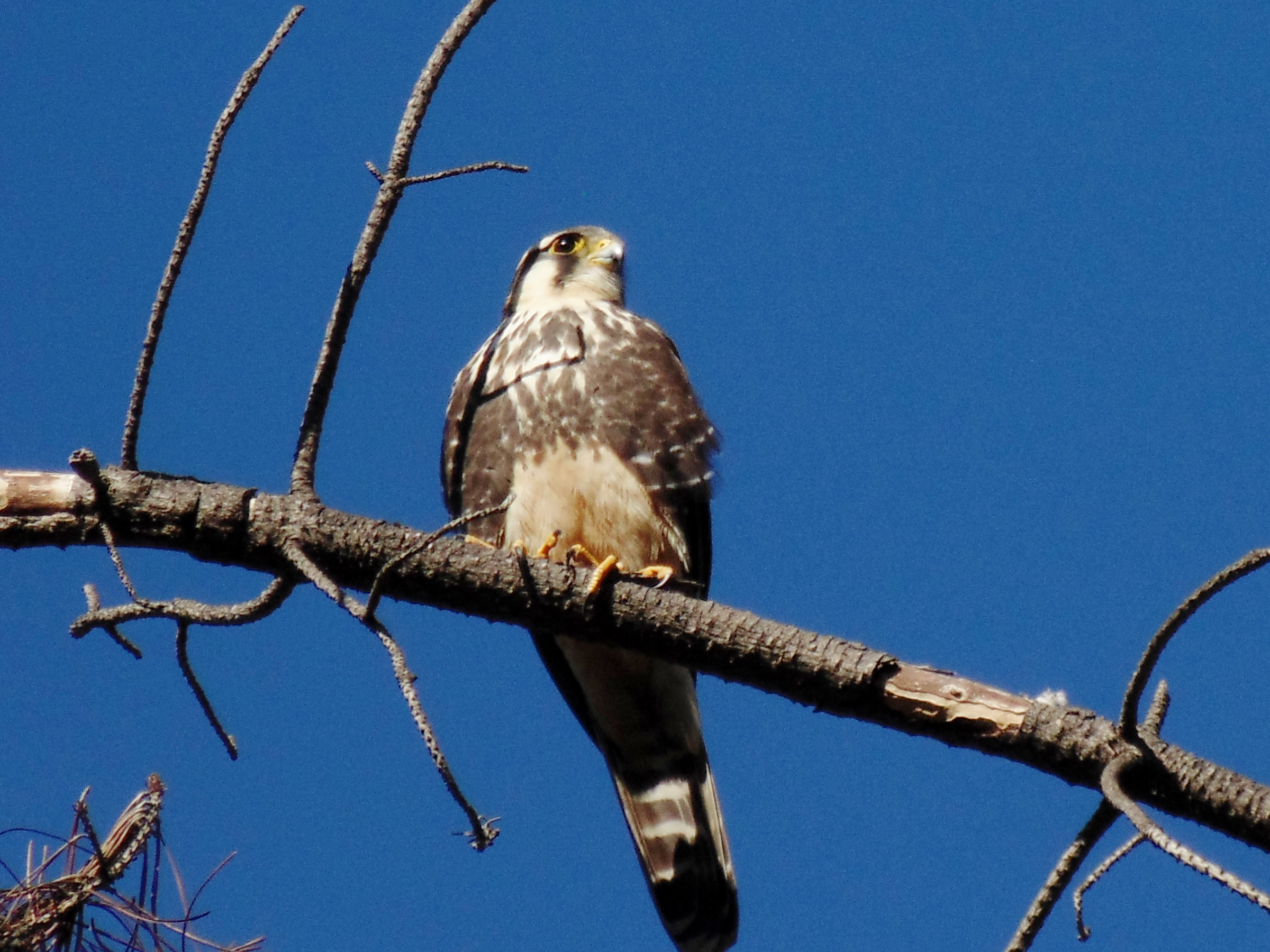
F. f. pichinchae, central Chile

The aplomado falcon is very slender, long-winged, and long-tailed, the size of a small peregrine falcon (F. peregrinus), at 30–40 cm (12–16 in) long and with an average wingspan of about 90 cm (35 in), but only half the weight, at about 208–305 g (7.3–10.8 oz) in males and 270–460 g (9.5–16.2 oz) in females. In adult birds, the upperparts are dark blue-grey, as is much of the head, with the usual falcon "moustache" contrasting sharply with the white throat and eyestripe. The upper breast continues the white of the throat; there are black patches on each side of the lower breast that meet in the middle; the belly and thighs, below the black patches, are light cinnamon. The tail is black with narrow white or grey bars and a white tip. The cere, eye-ring, and feet are yellow or yellow-orange.

Except that females are bigger than males, the sexes are similar. Juvenile birds are very similar to adults, but their upperparts and belly band are blackish brown, the chest is streaked with black, the white on the head and breast is buffy, and the cinnamon on the underparts is paler, as are the feet.

This species may be confused with the bat falcon (F. rufigularis) and the orange-breasted falcon (F. deiroleucus), which have similar black-white-rust patterns below, but those species are built more like peregrine falcons and have solidly blackish heads and darker rufous bellies.

== Taxonomy ==
Aplomado falcon had previously been considered related to bat falcon and orange-breasted falcon, but more recent genetic work in 2015 showed that those two do not belong to the same lineage; instead, aplomado falcon may surprisingly be most closely allied to the New Zealand falcon F. novaeseelandiae, and with this, more loosely to a large group of falcons including prairie falcon F. mexicanus, peregrine falcon F. peregrinus and its allies, and the hierofalcon group.

=== Subspecies ===
Three subspecies are accepted:

- Falco femoralis septentrionalis Todd, 1916 — northern Mexico south to Guatemala; formerly also Mexican border areas of the United States; small numbers reintroduced there.
- Falco femoralis femoralis Temminck, 1822 — Nicaragua and Belize south through South America east of the Andes to Tierra del Fuego
- Falco femoralis pichinchae Chapman, 1925 — western Colombia to northern Chile and northwestern Argentina, mainly west of the Andes

Compared to nominate F. f. femoralis, the northern subspecies F. f. septentrionalis is slightly larger and paler, while the southwestern F. f. pichinchae is slightly larger and darker, and with an incomplete breast band.

== Range, ecology and status ==
The preferred habitat is dry grasslands, savannas, and marshes. In Brazil, is commonly observed in some large cities, such as São Paulo. It ranges from northern Mexico and Trinidad locally to southern South America, but has become extinct from many parts of its range, including all of northern and central Mexico except for a small area of Chihuahua. Globally, however, it is sufficiently widespread that it is assessed as Species of Least Concern by the IUCN.

It feeds on large invertebrates and small vertebrates, with small birds making up the overwhelming bulk of its prey. Mixed-species feeding flocks in open cerrado and grassland will go on frenzied alert upon spotting aplomado falcons; small birds fear it more than most other predators. It is often seen soaring at twilight hunting insects and eating them on the wing. It also hunts over fields being burned, at which many birds of this species may gather; cooperation between individual aplomado falcons, usually members of a pair, has also been recorded. In Brazil, aplomado falcons have been observed following maned wolves (Chrysocyon brachyurus) and chasing birds that the wolves flush. Prey items typically weigh one-fifth to one-half of the falcons' own weight, but females (which due to their size can tackle larger prey) have been recorded eating birds larger than themselves, such as a cattle egret (Bulbucus ibis) or a plain chachalaca (Ortalis vetula), on rare occasions.

The nest is a platform built of sticks at any height in a bush or tree. Two or three eggs are laid.

=== Reintroductions ===
Until the 1950s it was found in the extreme southwestern United States, and reintroduction efforts are under way in West and South Texas. It began to reoccupy its former range in West Texas and southern New Mexico in the 1990s. Documentary evidence for these naturally occurring birds was obtained in New Mexico in 1991, and sightings built steadily through that decade and the next, leading to successful fledging of three young in 2002. Sightings and nesting activity continue to the present. The addition of nesting platforms to areas where Northern Aplomado Falcons Falco femoralis septentrionalis were reintroduced in South Texas improved the birds' productivity. This resulted in a stable population, however without the addition of nest platforms the re-introduced population would likely decline to extinction.

The expansion of the reintroduction program to that area has met with criticism, because technically, all aplomado falcons in New Mexico are classified as part of the "experimental" (reintroduction) population. As such, while they are still legally protected from hunting, they are not protected by Endangered Species Act requirements to preserve habitat and the like. It is believed that mainly habitat destruction caused the species' (near-)disappearance from the US and hinders reestablishment of a wild breeding population. A coalition of environmental groups is attempting to have full protection restored so as not to jeopardize the success of the expanding wild population and the reintroduction efforts. A published paper describes the mixed success of the reintroduction program, carried out by The Peregrine Fund. Reintroduced birds are now breeding on the Texas coast. But in the Chihuahuan Desert locations of west Texas and southern New Mexico, the birds were never successful for an extended period of time, and The Peregrine Fund has now abandoned the reintroduction program.
