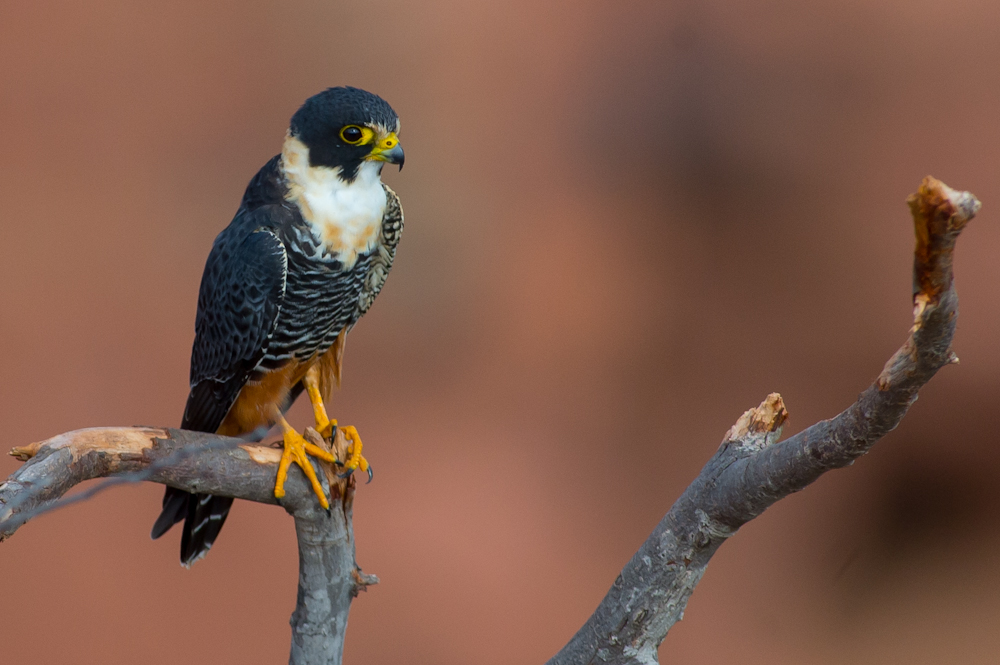

Conservation status
- Least Concern (IUCN 3.1)

Scientific classification
- Kingdom: Animalia
- Phylum: Chordata
- Class: Aves
- Order: Falconiformes
- Family: Falconidae
- Genus: Falco
- Species: F. rufigularis

Binomial name
- Falco rufigularis Daudin, 1800

Synonyms
- Falco albigularis Daudin, 1800; Falco fuscocaerulescens Vieillot, 1817 (modern spelling); Falco fusco-coerulescens Vieillot, 1817 (original spelling); Odontorhynchus rufigularis

= Bat falcon =

Species of bird

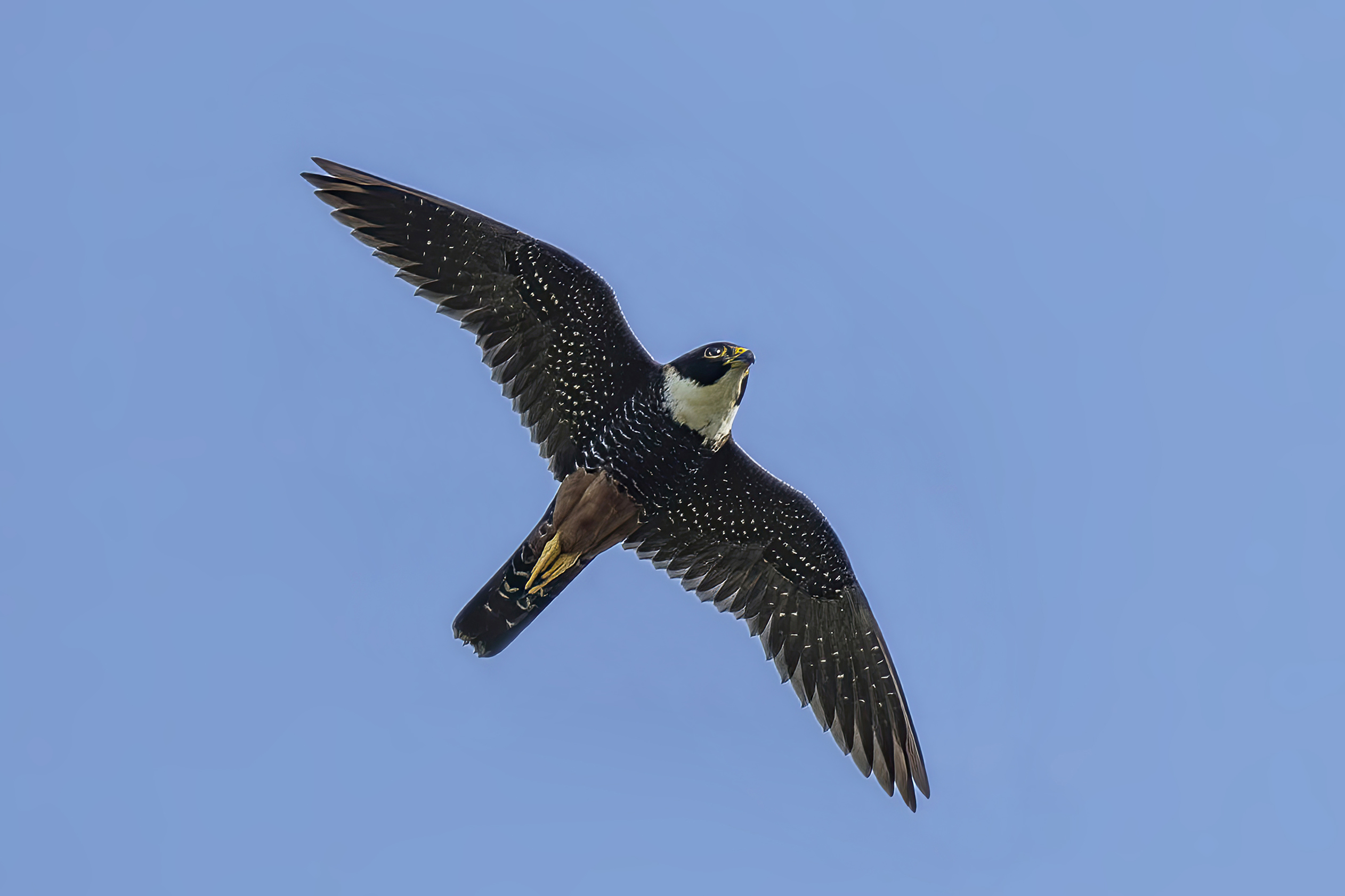
F.r. petoensis Orange Walk District, Belize

The bat falcon (Falco rufigularis) is a bird of prey in the family Falconidae, the falcons and caracaras. It is found in Mexico, Central America, Trinidad, and every mainland South American country except Chile and Uruguay.

== Taxonomy and systematics ==
The bat falcon was long known as Falco albigularis; the names Falco fusco-coerulescens or Falco fuscocaerulescens, long used for the aplomado falcon (F. femoralis), are now believed to refer to the present species.

The bat falcon has these three subspecies:

- F. r. petoensis Chubb, 1918
- F. r. rufigularis Daudin, 1800
- F. r. ophryophanes (Salvadori, 1895)

Some authors maintain that F. r. petoensis and F. r. ophryophanes are not subspecies but clinal variations in plumage. Others add a fourth subspecies F. r. petrophilus that is usually included in petoensis. Yet others assign only two subspecies, the nominate F. r. rufigularis and F. r. petrophilus.

The bat falcon is closely related to and looks like a small version of the orange-breasted falcon (F. deiroleucus), with which it has often been misidentified. They share plumage and vocal characteristics and are sister species. These two had been thought to be closely related to the aplomado falcon (F. femoralis), but more recent genetic evidence shows they are more closely related to the Old World hobbies than to any other New World falcon.

== Description ==
The bat falcon is 23 to 30 cm (9.1 to 12 in) long. Males weigh 108 to 150 g (3.8 to 5.3 oz) and have a wingspan of 51 to 58 cm (20 to 23 in). Females weigh 177 to 242 g (6.2 to 8.5 oz) and have a wingspan of 65 to 67 cm (26 to 26 in). They have long wings and a longish tail with a square tip. The sexes have similar plumage. Adults have blue-black head and upperparts with grayish edges on the feathers from the upper back to the uppertail coverts. Their throat, upper breast, and sides of the neck are white to buff, sometimes with some cinnamon; the rest of their breast is black with fine white bars. Their belly, thighs, and undertail coverts are chestnut-rufous. Their tail is blackish with thin white or grayish bars and a white or buff tip. The underside of their wings is black with fine white bars. Their cere and bare skin around the eye are bright yellow, their iris black-brown, and their legs and feet orange-yellow. Juveniles are duller and browner than adults, with a buffier throat, a tawny tinge to the breast's barring, and black bars or spots on the undertail coverts. The three subspecies are similar, differing mainly in the tone of their plumage colors.

== Distribution and habitat ==
The subspecies of the bat falcon are found thus:

- F. r. petoensis, from northern Mexico south through all of Central America and west of the Andes of Colombia, Ecuador, and extreme northwestern Peru
- F. r. rufigularis, Trinidad and from eastern Colombia east through Venezuela and the Guianas and south through eastern Ecuador, eastern Peru, northern and eastern Bolivia, southern Brazil, and northern Argentina
- F. r. ophryophanes, central Brazil and adjacent eastern Bolivia, Paraguay, and northeastern Argentina

A juvenile male of subspecies F. r. petoensis wandered to Santa Ana National Wildlife Refuge in Alamo, Texas, in December 2021, for the only U.S. record of the species. It stayed in the area into early March.

F. r. rufigularis is resident on Trinidad and has been recorded as a vagrant on Tobago.

The bat falcon inhabits tropical forest. It favors unbroken mature forest but also occurs at the forest edge, in gallery forest, on wooded savanna, on cleared land with some remaining trees, and even in suburban and urban areas. In elevation it mostly ranges from sea level to about 1,700 m (5,600 ft) with a single record in Bolivia at about 3,250 m (10,700 ft).

== Behavior ==
=== Movement ===
The bat falcon is apparently mostly sedentary. However, the records in Texas, at high elevation in Bolivia, on Tobago, and on islands off the Yucatán Peninsula, Honduras, and Panama show a pattern of wandering.

=== Feeding ===
Bat falcons perch conspicuously on high, open snags, from which they launch aerial attacks on their prey. They also hunt in sustained flight. Most hunting is around dawn or dusk and often continues well past sunset. Their diet is eclectic; they hunt bats, birds (such as swifts, swallows, hummingbirds, parakeets, tanagers and small water birds), small rodents, snakes, lizards, frogs, and large insects such as dragonflies, butterflies, moths, grasshoppers, true bugs, beetles, and hymenopterans. In most areas vertebrates contribute the most to biomass consumed, varying from 66% to 96% in various studies, and birds made up between 32% and 85% of the vertebrates. Invertebrates dominate numerically, and young are fed large numbers of them. Bats generally contribute less than 14% of prey biomass but some pairs seem to specialize in them.

=== Breeding ===
The bat falcon's breeding season varies geographically. It spans from February to June in Mexico and northern Central America. It nests in February on Trinidad and probably between October and February in Argentina. Eggs have been noted in March in Venezuela, in April in Guyana, and in August near Manaus, Brazil. Most nests are in tree cavities, either natural or excavated by parrots, and between 10 and 50 m (35 and 165 ft) above the ground. Others have been noted in abandoned trogon nest cavities in arboreal termite nests, on cliffs, and on pre-Columbian ruins. The clutch size is two to four eggs. The incubation period is thought to be about 30 days, fledging occurs about 35 to 40 days after hatch, and young are dependent on the parents for at least 12 weeks after fledging. Both sexes incubate the eggs with the female doing at least 75% of the effort and in some areas all of it. Males provide food for incubating females and also most of the food for nestlings.

=== Vocalization ===
The bat falcon is vocal "in breeding season, especially near nest, in contacts with other raptors, and even when attacking prey." Its main call is a "rapid shrill screaming" kee-kee-kee.. or kew-kew-kew..; the male's is higher pitched than the female's. Other calls include "an even higher and thinner "tsee-tsee-tsee..."", a "low-intensity "chit" given in contact", and by the female, "a whining or high-pitched wailing call with a wavering quality".

== Status ==
The IUCN has assessed the bat falcon as being of Least Concern. It has an extremely large range and an estimated population of at least a half million mature individuals, though the latter is believed to be decreasing. No immediate threats have been identified. It is "[w]idespread and generally not uncommon in appropriate habitat, it being one of the most widely distributed New World falcons." But it "no longer breeds in several areas where forest extensively transformed to agriculture" and "pesticides [have] unquestionably affected breeding success" in Mexico and Central America.
