= Michael Wood (New Zealand politician) =

New Zealand politician

The Honourable Michael Wood
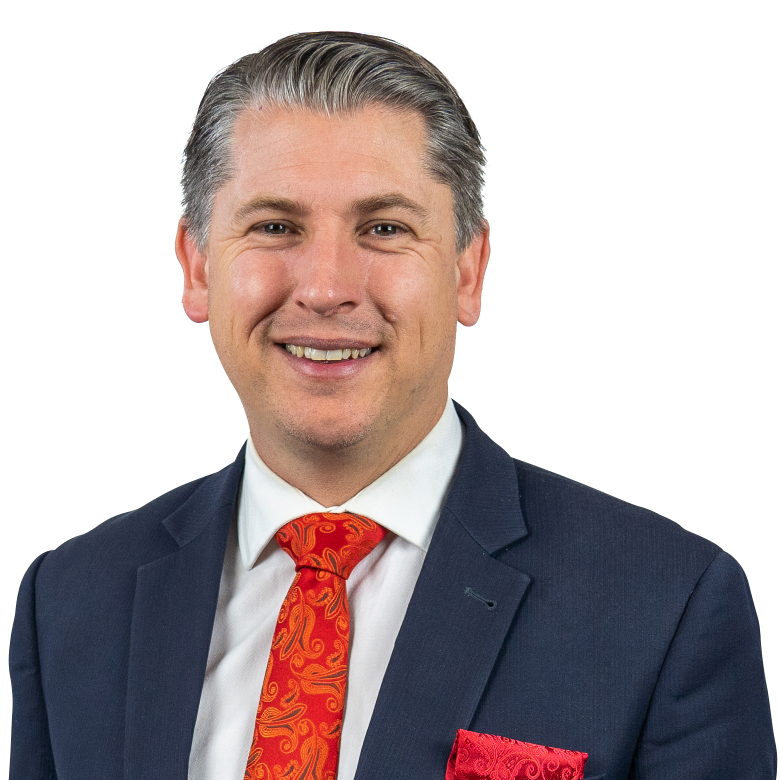
- Wood in 2023

4th Minister for Workplace Relations and Safety
- In office 6 November 2020 – 21 June 2023
- Prime Minister: Jacinda Ardern; Chris Hipkins
- Preceded by: Andrew Little
- Succeeded by: Carmel Sepuloni

58th Minister of Immigration
- In office 14 June 2022 – 21 June 2023
- Prime Minister: Jacinda Ardern; Chris Hipkins
- Preceded by: Kris Faafoi
- Succeeded by: Andrew Little

2nd Minister for Auckland
- In office 1 February 2023 – 21 June 2023
- Prime Minister: Chris Hipkins
- Preceded by: Vacant (last held by Judith Tizard)
- Succeeded by: Carmel Sepuloni

28th Minister of Transport
- In office 6 November 2020 – 6 June 2023
- Prime Minister: Jacinda Ardern; Chris Hipkins
- Preceded by: Phil Twyford
- Succeeded by: David Parker

Deputy Leader of the House
- In office 6 November 2020 – 14 June 2022
- Prime Minister: Jacinda Ardern
- Preceded by: Iain Lees-Galloway
- Succeeded by: Kieran McAnulty

Chief Government Whip in the House of Representatives
- In office 27 June 2019 – 2 November 2020
- Prime Minister: Jacinda Ardern
- Preceded by: Ruth Dyson
- Succeeded by: Kieran McAnulty

Parliamentary Under-Secretary for Ethnic Communities
- In office 26 October 2017 – 27 June 2019
- Prime Minister: Jacinda Ardern
- Minister: Jenny Salesa
- Succeeded by: Priyanca Radhakrishnan

Member of the New Zealand Parliament for Mount Roskill
- In office 3 December 2016 – 14 October 2023
- Preceded by: Phil Goff
- Succeeded by: Carlos Cheung

Member of the New Zealand Parliament for Mount Roskill
- Incumbent
- Assumed office 7 November 2026
- Preceded by: Carlos Cheung

Personal details
- Born: 10 May 1980 (age 46)
- Party: Labour
- Spouse: Julie Fairey
- Children: 3

Michael Philip Wood (born 10 May 1980) is a New Zealand Labour Party politician and a member of the New Zealand House of Representatives, representing Mount Roskill for 2026 and between 2016 and 2023.

He was Minister of Immigration, Minister for Workplace Relations and Safety, Minister of Transport, and Minister for Auckland in the second term of the Sixth Labour Government until his resignation in June 2023 due to controversies over shares. During the 2026 New Zealand general election, Wood successfully contested the Mount Roskill electorate for Labour and was returned to Parliament based on preliminary results.

== Early life ==
Wood was born in 1980. He attended Pakūranga College and graduated from the University of Auckland with a Bachelor of Arts in 2005. While a university student Wood worked as a Christmas tree salesman. After finishing university he initially worked in retail jobs for several years, including at Hugh Wright's, a men's clothing store. He joined the union movement, and worked as an organiser as a senior negotiator for the financial sector union Finance and Information Workers Union. He then joined Habitat for Humanity as an advisor working on several issues such as their health and safety procedures.

== Labour Party activism and candidancy ==
In 1998, his first year at university, he became critical of the direction of New Zealand under the Fourth National Government, confirmed by that year's power crisis in Auckland. Wood reflected that the period was "a sign that things weren’t working well in our society." He joined Princes Street Labour and later took part in the Hikoi for Hope, a 1998 nationwide protest against inequality led by the Anglican Church of New Zealand.

Before being elected to Parliament for the first time in 2016, Wood stood unsuccessfully for Labour on numerous occasions, often in safe National seats. He stood in Pakuranga during the 2002 and 2005 elections and was on the Labour Party list in 2008. He was the Labour candidate during the 2011 Botany by-election and in the 2014 election stood in Epsom.

Wood successfully contested the Puketāpapa Local Board representing Roskill Community Voice alongside his wife Julie Fairey in 2010. He was re-elected to that role in 2013, but declined to contest the position again in 2016 after being selected to run in the safe Labour seat of Mount Roskill in the 2017 election.

Wood had been for some time prior to his nomination the Mount Roskill electorate chairman. The electorate had been held by Phil Goff since 1993. Goff announced his candidacy for the 2016 Auckland mayoralty election in November 2015. Wood was announced as Labour's new Mount Roskill candidate in June 2016, with an endorsement from Goff. The announcement was made early in the electoral cycle because of the potential for a by-election in late 2016 or early 2017 subject to Goff winning the mayoral election and resigning from Parliament.

== Member of Parliament ==
New Zealand Parliament
Years	Term	Electorate		Party
2016–2017	51st	Mt Roskill		Labour
2017–2020	52nd	Mt Roskill	27	Labour
2020–2023	53rd	Mt Roskill	23	Labour
2026–present	55th	Mt Roskill	none	Labour

=== First term, 2016–2017 ===
Following Goff's election to the Auckland mayoralty and resignation as a Member of Parliament in October 2016, Wood was confirmed as the candidate for the Mt Roskill by-election. Turnout was above average for a by-election, and Wood received more than twice as many votes as his closest rival, Parmjeet Parmar of the National Party.

On 16 December 2016, he was named as the Labour Party's spokesman on Consumer Affairs, Ethnic Communities, and Revenue. On 7 February 2017, the first sitting day of Parliament since his election, he took the House of Representatives' Oath of Allegiance and was appointed to the Finance and Expenditure Committee.

=== Sixth Labour Government ===
In the 2017 New Zealand general election, Wood retained the Mount Roskill electorate, preserving his large majority. He was sworn in as Parliamentary Under-Secretary for Ethnic Communities following the formation of the Sixth Labour Government, and was additionally appointed as chair of the Finance and Expenditure Committee.

In a June 2019 reshuffle, Wood was promoted to Chief Government Whip, succeeding Ruth Dyson. He was a member of the Epidemic Response Committee, a select committee that considered the government's response to the COVID-19 pandemic.

In the 2020 New Zealand general election, Wood was re-elected in Mount Roskill by a final margin of 13,853 votes, defeating the National Party's candidate Parmjeet Parmar. He was promoted to cabinet following the 2020 election, becoming Minister of Transport, Minister for Workplace Relations and Safety, and Deputy Leader of the House.

In a cabinet reshuffle announced by Ardern on 13 June 2022, Wood was succeeded as Deputy Leader of the House by Kieran McAnulty and took on the position of Minister of Immigration whilst retaining the Transport and Workplace Safety portfolios.

In late January 2022, Wood in his capacity as Transport Minister announced that the New Zealand Government had approved a NZ$14.6 billion project to establish a partially tunneled light rail network between Auckland Airport and the Auckland CBD. The planned light rail network would integrate with current train and bus hubs as well as the City Rail Link's stations and connections. He also confirmed that the Government would decide on plans to establish a second harbour crossing at Waitemata Harbour in 2023. The light rail network was supported by the Green Party but criticised by the ACT party as a waste of taxpayer money.

In early July 2022, Wood in his capacity as Immigration Minister stated that hospitality and tourism businesses needed to raise their wages in order to attract more foreign workers to New Zealand. His remarks were criticised by the ACT party candidate Chris Baillie, who accused him of attacking businesses. Wood defended his remarks, stating that he had spoken to hospitality and tourism workers. On 5 July, he defended the Government's decision to exclude nurses from its fast-track residency pathway on the ground that nurses left their profession after gaining residency status. The National Party's immigration spokesperson Erica Stanford criticised the exclusion of nurses as discriminatory and claimed that it worsened the country's shortage of nurses.

On 1 February 2023, Wood gained the additional portfolios of Minister for Auckland and Associate Minister of Finance in Prime Minister Chris Hipkins' Cabinet.

=== Conflicts of interest and removal from ministerial positions ===
Wood lost his ministerial roles in June 2023 due to a failure to meet an obligation to declare financial interests that were in conflict with his ministerial responsibilities.

On 6 June, Wood was suspended from his transport ministerial portfolio by Hipkins after failing to declare that he had shares in Auckland Airport. Wood had purchased about 1,530 shares (now worth about NZ$13,000) in the 1990s. Though he had declared the shares to the Cabinet Office when he became a minister in 2020, he failed to declare them in the public register of MPs' assets and other interests until 2022 and had falsely advised the Cabinet Office that the shares had been divested. Kieran McAnulty assumed the role of acting Transport Minister.

On 8 June, Wood confirmed that he had sold his Auckland Airport shares for about $16,400, with the money being donated to the Anglican Trust for Women and Children. He also corrected his additional pecuniary interest registers. Sir Maarten Wevers, the Registrar of Pecuniary and Other Specified Interests, launched an inquiry into whether Wood had complied with obligations to declare his interests. The report of the inquiry was published on 18 July. Wevers was critical of Wood for having failed to manage his conflicts of interests as a minister, including "a lack of awareness of the need to correct errors and omissions" and to do so in a timely way, and for tarnishing the reputation of Parliament. Wood was referred to Parliament's Privileges Committee.

Before the inquiry could be completed, on 21 June, Wood resigned as a minister, after revelations that additional shares he owned in Chorus, Spark, and National Australia Bank (NAB) had not been disclosed. After announcing Wood's resignation, Hipkins announced that Carmel Sepuloni would take on his roles as Minister for Auckland and Minister for Workplace Relations and Safety. Andrew Little would take on the Immigration portfolio, David Parker would take on Transport, and Kiri Allan would take on the Associate Finance role. Hipkins also announced new procedures for ministers regarding the declaration of conflicts of interest.

On 29 June, Wood was granted the use of the honorific prefix The Honourable for life, in recognition of his term as a member of the Executive Council.

On 18 July, Wood was referred to Parliament's Privileges Committee for failing to manage his conflict of interests as a minister. On 23 August, the Privileges Committee found that he had neglected his duties over a significant period of time but that his actions did not amount to contempt. The Committee recommended that he apologise to Parliament for failing to declare his shareholdings.

=== 2023 general election ===
During the 2023 New Zealand general election held on 14 October, Wood lost the Mt Roskill electorate to National Party candidate Carlos Cheung. After the election, he was elected to the Labour Party policy council. In campaign material for that election, he said Labour needed to develop more progressive tax policy that addresses inequities before it would be able to return to government.

=== 2026 general election ===
During the 2026 New Zealand general election held on 7 November, Wood stood as the Labour Party candidate for Mount Roskill once again. Based on preliminary results, Wood defeated the incumbent National Party MP Carlos Cheung by a narrow margin of 262 votes and was elected back into Parliament.

== Post-parliamentary career ==
After leaving Parliament, Wood was appointed as Negotiation Specialist at trade union E tū, where he advocated for workers impacted by a restructure at TVNZ in March 2024.

== Political positions ==
Wood was opposed to End of Life Choice and in favour of legalising recreational cannabis.

During the 2022 Wellington protest, Wood stated on 17 February there was a "river of filth" and claimed that anti-vaccine mandate protesters were motivated by violence, anti-Semitism, and Islamophobia. He also implored members of the centre-right National and ACT parties not to engage with the protesters.

== Personal life ==
Wood is married to Julie Fairey, who was elected to the Auckland Council during the 2022 Auckland local elections as a councillor for the Albert-Eden-Puketāpapa ward. Wood and Fairey have a long history of being politically active; both having run campaigns as electorate MPs in the 2002 New Zealand general election. In 2010, Wood and Fairey were elected together as members of the Puketāpapa Local Board. Wood lives in Roskill South with his wife and their three sons. For several years he was the main caregiver for his children.

New Zealand Parliament
Preceded by Phil Goff	Member of Parliament for Mount Roskill; 2016–2023	Succeeded by Carlos Cheung
Preceded by Carlos Cheung	Member of Parliament for Mount Roskill; 2026–present	Incumbent
Political offices
Preceded by Phil Twyford	Minister of Transport; 2020–2023	Succeeded by David Parker
Preceded by Andrew Little	Minister for Workplace Relations and Safety; 2020–2023	Succeeded by Carmel Sepuloni
Preceded by Kris Faafoi	Minister of Immigration; 2022–2023	Succeeded by Andrew Little
In abeyance As Minister for Auckland Issues Title last held by Judith Tizard	Minister for Auckland; 2023	Succeeded by Carmel Sepuloni
Preceded by Iain Lees-Galloway	Deputy Leader of the House; 2020–2022	Succeeded by Kieran McAnulty
Party political offices
Preceded by Ruth Dyson	Senior Whip of the Labour Party; 2019–2020	Succeeded by Kieran McAnulty
