= Deputy Prime Minister of New Zealand =

New Zealand minister of the Crown

- Coat of Arms of New Zealand

- Flag of New Zealand

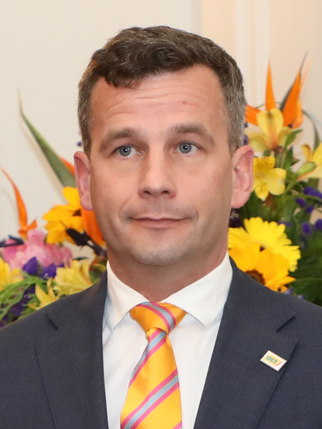
- Incumbent; David Seymour since 31 May 2025
- Department of the Prime Minister and Cabinet
- Style: Mr Deputy Prime Minister (informal); The Honourable (formal); His Excellency (diplomatic)
- Member of: Cabinet of New Zealand; Executive Council
- Reports to: Prime Minister of New Zealand
- Appointer: Governor-General of New Zealand
- Term length: No fixed term
- Formation: 13 December 1949; 76 years ago
- First holder: Keith Holyoake
- Salary: NZ$362,600 annually

The deputy prime minister of New Zealand (Māori: te pirimia tuarua o Aotearoa) is the second-most senior member of the Cabinet of New Zealand. The officeholder usually deputises for the prime minister at official functions. Since 31 May 2025, the current deputy prime minister is David Seymour of the ACT Party.

The role existed on an informal basis for as long as the office of prime minister/premier has existed, but the office of "deputy prime minister" was formally established as a ministerial portfolio in 1949. This means that Keith Holyoake is considered the first deputy prime minister. It was formally designated as a full cabinet level position in 1954.

== Appointment and duties ==
The post of deputy prime minister was formally established in 1949. (Note: A few ministers were referred to as "deputy prime minister" before 1949, such as Peter Fraser and Walter Nash. However, this was a descriptive title and not a formal ministerial portfolio.) Eighteen individuals have held the position (with one of them doing so twice, and one doing so thrice) and of those people: Holyoake, Marshall, Watt, Muldoon, Palmer, Clark and English have eventually served as prime minister. (Note: Some lists consider Hugh Watt as a New Zealand Prime Minister. Watt served as acting Prime Minister for seven days from 31 August to 6 September 1974 following the death of Norman Kirk. He is not normally counted in the official numbering of New Zealand Prime Ministers.) The deputy prime minister has always been a member of the Cabinet and has always held at least one substantive portfolio.

The deputy prime minister "...can, if necessary" exercise the statutory and constitutional functions and powers of the prime minister if the prime minister is unavailable or unable. They can also do the same as acting prime minister, in consultation with the prime minister if it is appropriate and practicable. The deputy prime minister can also temporarily act as interim prime minister until the leadership of the government is determined in some cases, like the death of the prime minister.

The position was most commonly held by the deputy leader of the largest party, but since the adoption of the MMP electoral system in 1996 and the greater frequency of coalition governments in New Zealand, the role may instead go to the leader of a junior government party. This has occurred three times with Winston Peters, leader of New Zealand First; once with Jim Anderton, leader of the Alliance; and once with David Seymour, leader of ACT New Zealand. Twice, the Labour Party has appointed a senior minister who was not the deputy party leader as the deputy prime minister (Grant Robertson and Carmel Sepuloni).

Little scholarly attention has focused on deputy prime ministers in New Zealand or elsewhere. In 2009, an article by Steven Barnes appeared in Political Science where nine 'qualities' of deputy prime ministership were identified: temperament; relationships with their Cabinet and caucus; relationships with their party; popularity with the public; media skills; achievements as deputy prime minister; relationship with the prime minister; leadership ambition; and method of succession. Barnes conducted a survey of journalists, academics, and former members of parliament to rank New Zealand deputy prime ministers up to that time since 1960. Across the nine deputy prime minister 'qualities', Don McKinnon achieved the number one ranking, followed by Brian Talboys, Michael Cullen, and Jack Marshall. In a second 'overall' ranking, Cullen was ranked number one, followed by Talboys, McKinnon, and Marshall. Winston Peters, Jim Anderton, and Bob Tizard were ranked lowest in both sections of the survey.

== List of deputy prime ministers of New Zealand ==
Key

Alliance Labour National NZ First ACT

| No. | Portrait | Name | Term of office | | Concurrent portfolio(s) | Prime Minister |
|---|---|---|---|---|---|---|
| 1 | | Keith Holyoake; MP for Pahiatua (1904–1983) | 13 December 1949 | 20 September 1957 | Minister of Agriculture | Holland |
| 2 | | Jack Marshall; MP for Karori (1912–1988) | 20 September 1957 | 12 December 1957 | Attorney-General; Minister of Justice | Holyoake |
| 3 | | Jerry Skinner; MP for Buller (1900–1962) | 12 December 1957 | 12 December 1960 | Minister of Agriculture; Minister of Lands | Nash |
| (2) | | Jack Marshall; MP for Karori (1912–1988) | 12 December 1960 | 9 February 1972 | Minister of Overseas Trade; Minister of Customs (until 1962); Minister of Industries and Commerce (until 1969); Attorney-General (1969–1971); Minister of Immigration (from 1969); Minister of Labour (from 1969) | Holyoake |
| 4 | | Robert Muldoon; MP for Tamaki (1921–1992) | 9 February 1972 | 8 December 1972 | Minister of Finance | Marshall |
| 5 | | Hugh Watt; MP for Onehunga (1912–1980) | 8 December 1972 | 1 September 1974 | Minister of Labour; Minister of Works (until 1974) | Kirk |
| 6 | | Bob Tizard; MP for Otahuhu (1924–2016) | 10 September 1974 | 12 December 1975 | Minister of Finance | Rowling |
| 7 | | Brian Talboys; MP for Wallace (1921–2012) | 12 December 1975 | 4 March 1981 | Minister of Foreign Affairs; Minister of Overseas Trade | Muldoon |
| 8 | | Duncan MacIntyre; MP for East Cape (1915–2001) | 4 March 1981 | 15 March 1984 | Minister of Agriculture | Muldoon |
| 9 | | Jim McLay; MP for Birkenhead (born 1945) | 15 March 1984 | 26 July 1984 | Attorney-General; Minister of Justice | Muldoon |
| 10 | | Geoffrey Palmer; MP for Christchurch Central (born 1942) | 26 July 1984 | 8 August 1989 | Attorney-General; Minister of Justice; Leader of the House (until 1987); Minister for the Environment (from 1987) | Lange |
| 11 | | Helen Clark; MP for Mount Albert (born 1950) | 8 August 1989 | 2 November 1990 | Minister of Health; Minister of Labour | Palmer |
| 11 | | Helen Clark; MP for Mount Albert (born 1950) | 8 August 1989 | 2 November 1990 | Minister of Health; Minister of Labour | Moore |
| 12 | | Don McKinnon; MP for Albany (born 1939) | 2 November 1990 | 16 December 1996 | Minister of Foreign Affairs; Minister of Overseas Trade; Leader of the House (from 1993) | Bolger |
| 13 | | Winston Peters; MP for Tauranga (born 1945) | 16 December 1996 | 14 August 1998 | Treasurer | Bolger |
| 13 | | Winston Peters; MP for Tauranga (born 1945) | 16 December 1996 | 14 August 1998 | Treasurer | Shipley |
| 14 | | Wyatt Creech; MP for Wairarapa (born 1946) | 14 August 1998 | 10 December 1999 | Leader of the House (until 1998); Minister of Education (until 1999); Minister of Health (from 1999) | Shipley |
| 15 | | Jim Anderton; MP for Wigram (1938–2018) | 10 December 1999 | 15 August 2002 | Minister of Economic Development; Minister of Consumer Affairs (from 2001); Minister of Customs (from 2001) | Clark |
| 16 | | Michael Cullen; List MP (1945–2021) | 15 August 2002 | 19 November 2008 | Minister of Finance; Leader of the House; Treasurer; Minister of Revenue (until 2005); Attorney-General (2005, 2006–2008) | Clark |
| 17 | | Bill English; MP for Clutha-Southland (until 2014); List MP (from 2014) (born 1961) | 19 November 2008 | 12 December 2016 | Minister of Finance; Minister for Infrastructure (until 2011) | Key |
| 18 | | Paula Bennett; MP for Upper Harbour (born 1969) | 12 December 2016 | 26 October 2017 | Minister of State Services; Minister of Tourism; Minister for Climate Change Issues; Minister of Police; Minister for Women | English |
| (13) | | Winston Peters; List MP (born 1945) | 26 October 2017 | 6 November 2020 | Minister of Foreign Affairs; Minister for Racing; Minister for State Owned Enterprises; Minister of Disarmament and Arms Control (from 2018) | Ardern |
| 19 | | Grant Robertson; MP for Wellington Central (born 1971) | 6 November 2020 | 25 January 2023 | Minister of Finance; Minister for Infrastructure; Minister for Sport and Recreation; Minister for Racing (until 2022) | Ardern |
| 20 | | Carmel Sepuloni; MP for Kelston (born 1977) | 25 January 2023 | 27 November 2023 | Minister for Arts, Culture and Heritage; Minister for Social Development and Employment; Minister for Workplace Relations and Safety; Minister for Auckland | Hipkins |
| (13) | | Winston Peters; List MP (born 1945) | 27 November 2023 | 31 May 2025 | Minister of Foreign Affairs; Minister for Racing; Minister for Rail (from 2024) | Luxon |
| 21 | | David Seymour; MP for Epsom (born 1983) | 31 May 2025 | Incumbent | Minister for Regulation | Luxon |
