= Phil Goff =

New Zealand politician

The Honourable Phil Goff CNZM
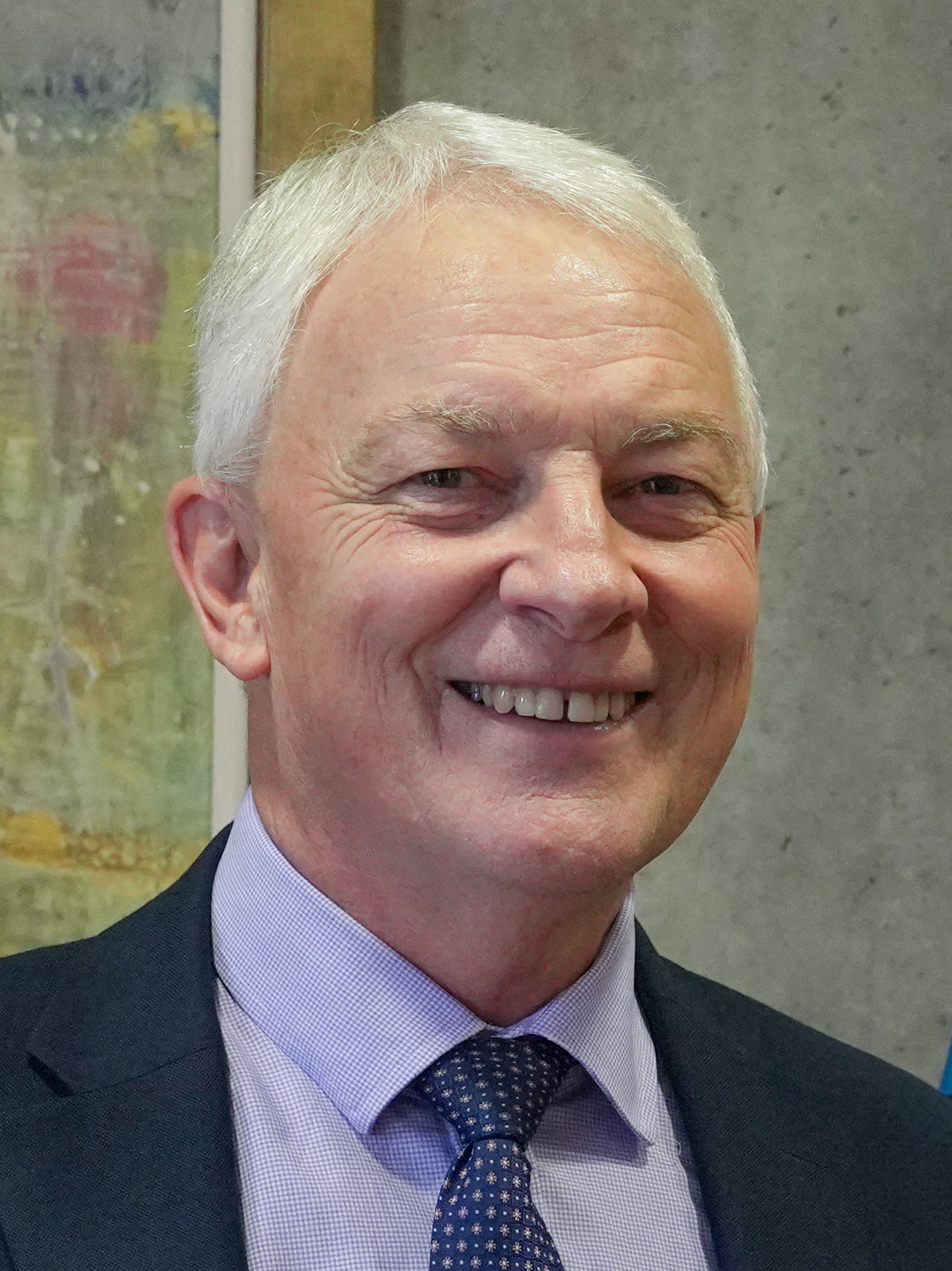
- Goff in 2024

33rd High Commissioner of New Zealand to the United Kingdom
- In office January 2023 – 6 March 2025
- Monarch: Charles III
- Prime Minister: Jacinda Ardern; Chris Hipkins; Christopher Luxon
- Preceded by: Bede Corry
- Succeeded by: Hamish Cooper

2nd Mayor of Auckland
- In office 15 October 2016 – 15 October 2022
- Deputy: Bill Cashmore
- Preceded by: Len Brown
- Succeeded by: Wayne Brown

32nd Leader of the Opposition
- In office 19 November 2008 – 13 December 2011
- Prime Minister: John Key
- Deputy: Annette King
- Preceded by: John Key
- Succeeded by: David Shearer

13th Leader of the Labour Party
- In office 11 November 2008 – 13 December 2011
- Deputy: Annette King
- Preceded by: Helen Clark
- Succeeded by: David Shearer
Ministerial offices 1984–2008
35th Minister of Defence
In office 19 October 2005 – 19 November 2008
Prime Minister	Helen Clark
Preceded by	Mark Burton
Succeeded by	Wayne Mapp
25th Minister of Foreign Affairs
In office 10 December 1999 – 19 October 2005
Prime Minister	Helen Clark
Preceded by	Don McKinnon
Succeeded by	Winston Peters
43rd Minister of Justice
In office 10 December 1999 – 19 October 2005
Prime Minister	Helen Clark
Preceded by	Tony Ryall
Succeeded by	Mark Burton
37th Minister of Education
In office 14 August 1989 – 2 November 1990
Prime Minister	Geoffrey Palmer; Mike Moore
Preceded by	Geoffrey Palmer
Succeeded by	Lockwood Smith
9th Minister of Employment
In office 6 April 1987 – 14 August 1989
Prime Minister	David Lange
Preceded by	Kerry Burke
Succeeded by	Annette King
14th Minister of Housing
In office 26 July 1984 – 26 August 1987
Prime Minister	David Lange
Preceded by	Tony Friedlander
Succeeded by	Helen Clark

Member of the New Zealand Parliament
- In office 6 November 1993 – 12 October 2016
- Preceded by: Gilbert Myles
- Succeeded by: Michael Wood
- Constituency: Roskill (1993–96); New Lynn (1996–99); Mount Roskill (1999–2016)
- In office 28 November 1981 – 27 October 1990
- Preceded by: Arthur Faulkner
- Succeeded by: Gilbert Myles
- Constituency: Roskill

Personal details
- Born: Philip Bruce Goff; 22 June 1953 (age 73) Auckland, New Zealand
- Party: Labour
- Spouse: Mary Ellen Goff (m. 1979)
- Children: 3
- Profession: Lecturer

Philip Bruce Goff CNZM (born 22 June 1953) is a New Zealand retired politician and former diplomat. He was a member of the New Zealand Parliament from 1981 to 1990 and again from 1993 to 2016. He served as leader of the Labour Party and leader of the Opposition between 11 November 2008 and 13 December 2011.

During the Fifth Labour Government, in office from 1999 to 2008, Goff was a senior minister in a number of portfolios, including Minister of Justice, Minister of Foreign Affairs and Trade, Minister of Defence, and Associate Minister of Finance.

Goff was elected mayor of Auckland in 2016, and served two terms, before retiring in 2022. In 2023 he took up a diplomatic post as High Commissioner of New Zealand to the United Kingdom, which he held until 2025.

== Early life ==
Goff was born and raised in Three Kings, Auckland. His family was very poor, and his father wanted Goff to enter the workforce immediately after finishing high school. Goff, however, wished to attend university, a decision that caused him to leave home when only sixteen years old. By working at Westfield Freezing Works and as a cleaner, Goff was able to fund himself through university, gaining an MA (with first class honours) in political studies at the University of Auckland. In 1973, he was Senior Scholar in Political Studies, and also won the Butterworth Prize for law. While completing his MA, he lectured in Political Studies. After his overseas experience in Europe, Goff returned to New Zealand where he became an Insurance Workers Union organiser.

== Member of Parliament ==
New Zealand Parliament
Years	Term	Electorate	List	Party
1981–1984	40th	Roskill		Labour
1984–1987	41st	Roskill		Labour
1987–1990	42nd	Roskill		Labour
1993–1996	44th	Roskill		Labour
1996–1999	45th	New Lynn	none	Labour
1999–2002	46th	Mount Roskill	7	Labour
2002–2005	47th	Mount Roskill	6	Labour
2005–2008	48th	Mount Roskill	6	Labour
2008–2011	49th	Mount Roskill	3	Labour
2011–2014	50th	Mount Roskill	1	Labour
2014–2016	51st	Mount Roskill	16	Labour

Goff joined the Labour Party in 1969, the same year he left home, and held a number of administrative positions within the party. He was chairman of the Labour Youth Movement and was twice elected a member of the Labour Party's national council. Goff was also campaign chairman for Eddie Isbey in the Papatoetoe electorate.

In early 1981 Goff put himself forward for the Labour candidacy for the Roskill electorate. He beat 13 contenders (including Malcolm Douglas, Owen Greatbatch, Ken Hastings, Norman Kingsbury, Wayne Mapp and Lois Welch) to win the nomination on 23 April 1981. The next day he resigned his trade union job to be a candidate full-time. In the 1981 elections, Goff was elected Member of Parliament for the Roskill electorate. In 1983 he was appointed as Labour's spokesperson for housing.

=== Cabinet minister: 1984–1990 ===
Three years later, when Labour won the 1984 elections, Goff was elevated to Cabinet by Prime Minister David Lange, becoming its youngest member. He served as Minister of Housing and (from 1986) Minister for the Environment. As Minister of Housing Goff provided money to finance loans to households in dire financial situations and purchased state rental units. In the disputes during the Fourth Labour Government between Roger Douglas (the reformist Finance Minister) and other Labour MPs, Goff generally positioned himself on the side of Douglas, supporting deregulation and free trade.

After the 1987 elections, Goff dropped the Housing portfolio, but also became Minister of Employment, Minister of Youth Affairs, Minister of Tourism and Associate Minister of Education (with responsibility for tertiary education). Goff instigated changes to funding of tertiary studies incorporating financial contributions by students rather than the complete government funding that existed at the time. State funding was seen as unsustainable due to large increases in student numbers. The changes included direct fees and streamlined bursaries and student loans. The bursary changes were generally regarded to be fair and were also backed up by a government guarantee to banks willing to fund loans by students. As Minister of Employment Goff oversaw a large increase in unemployment which had risen to 128,000 people by November 1988. There were several protests and marches on Parliament where he faced and spoke to crowds of unemployed people. In response he committed $100 million to reinstate government subsidised training schemes to help the unemployed gain skills for new jobs.

Later, after a significant rearrangement of responsibilities in August 1989 following Lange's resignation, Goff became Minister of Education under new Prime Minister Geoffrey Palmer while relinquishing Employment and Youth Affairs. As Minister of Education he was against any further cuts to tertiary education threatening to resign if there were. He also inherited responsibility for the Tomorrow's Schools reform initiative discovering budgeting errors and a staffing shortage that occurred under his predecessor in the portfolio (Lange). According to cabinet colleague Michael Bassett Goff, despite his best efforts, was never able to regain the initiative in education as a result of this.

=== In opposition: 1990–1999 ===
In the 1990 elections, Labour was defeated, and Goff lost his parliamentary seat to the National Party's Gilbert Myles. While many commentators blamed Douglas's controversial reforms for Labour's loss, Goff said that the main problem had been in communication, not policy. Goff was appointed to a position at the Auckland Institute of Technology, and later accepted a scholarship to study for six months at Oxford University. Returning to New Zealand, he eventually decided to stand for parliament again.

In the 1993 elections, Goff was re-elected as MP for Roskill. Helen Clark, Labour's new leader, made him the party's spokesperson for justice. In 1996, Goff was part of the group which asked Clark to step down as leader. Clark survived the challenge, and was advised by her allies to demote Goff, but chose not to do so.

Goff retained his seat in the 1996 elections, having elected not to be placed on Labour's party list. In Opposition from 1996 to 1999, Goff was Labour's spokesperson on justice, courts, and corrections. After Mike Moore left Parliament to become Director-General of the World Trade Organization Goff also became the party's spokesperson for foreign affairs.

=== Cabinet minister: 1999–2008 ===
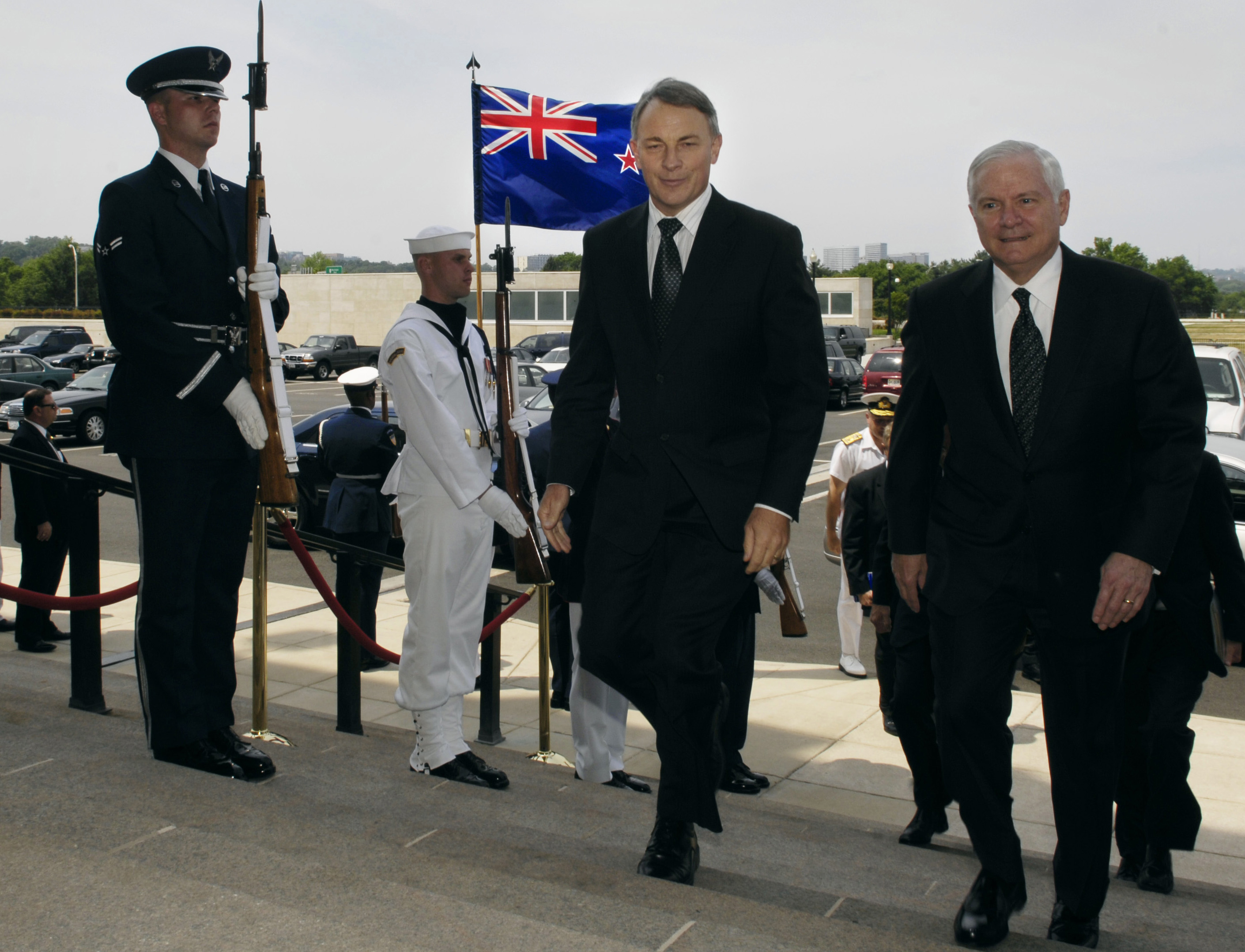
Goff and U.S. Secretary of Defense Robert Gates walk into the Pentagon, 11 May 2007.

In the 1999 elections, which Labour won, Goff accepted seventh place on the party list, but also retained his electorate seat. In the Clark-led Fifth Labour Government, he became Minister of Foreign Affairs and Trade and Minister of Justice. He retained this position after the 2002 elections. Following the 2005 elections and government formation negotiations, New Zealand First party leader Winston Peters was made Minister of Foreign Affairs, and Goff was made Minister of Defence, Minister of Trade, Minister of Disarmament and Arms Control, and Minister of Pacific Island Affairs. He was also named an Associate Minister of Finance, in a move that was seen to balance his loss of the foreign affairs portfolio.

In 2001 he was centred in the decision to take in 131 refugees from the MV Tampa. The ship had previously been denied entry to Australia by the government of John Howard, dubbed by media as the "Tampa affair". In 2019, Goff stated he thought that New Zealand's decision to take refugees from the Tampa was one of the best decisions made by the Fifth Labour Government. In the aftermath of the September 11 attacks Goff offered New Zealand support to the United States and worked to locate New Zealanders in the area. In 2021 he stated that he felt a personal responsibility when he learned that two New Zealand nationals died in the attack. In October 2001 New Zealand joined the war in Afghanistan against the perpetrators of the attacks. Goff defended the use of air strikes as part of the invasion which the government stressed were targeted at terrorists and were justified under the United Nations Charter stating that they were "regrettably necessary".

In 2003 the Labour government was critical of the American lead Invasion of Iraq which lacked an explicit United Nations mandate, and the New Zealand government withheld military action in the Iraq War. Despite not sending combat troops, the government sent some medical and engineering units to Iraq. In 2003 convicted rapist Stewart Murray Wilson doctored and distributed a letter from Justice Minister Goff, in an apparent attempt to get his case reviewed. In 2005, as justice minister, Goff passed legislation that dramatically strengthened laws condemning child pornography and child sex.

As Foreign Affairs and Trade Minister, Goff favoured free trade deals as a means of diplomacy and strengthening New Zealand's links with Asian neighbours. Goff had a strong public profile and became one of the better-known members of the Labour Party; he was placed number three on the Labour Party list during the 2008 general election. Clark and Goff differed substantially in their economic policies, but they were able to work relatively well together, and this was shown during Goff's signing of the New Zealand–China Free Trade Agreement. The free trade agreement with China took over three years to negotiate with the first round of negotiations being held in December 2004 before the FTA was signed after fifteen negotiation rounds took place. Goff signed the agreement on behalf of the New Zealand government together with the Chinese Minister of Commerce Chen Deming at the Great Hall of the People in Beijing on 7 April 2008. Under the agreement, 37 per cent of Chinese exports to New Zealand and 35 percent of New Zealand exports to China would become tariff free by October 2008, all tariffs for Chinese exports to New Zealand were to be eliminated by 2016, and 96 percent of New Zealand exports to China would be tariff free by 2019.

=== Leader of the Opposition: 2008–2011 ===
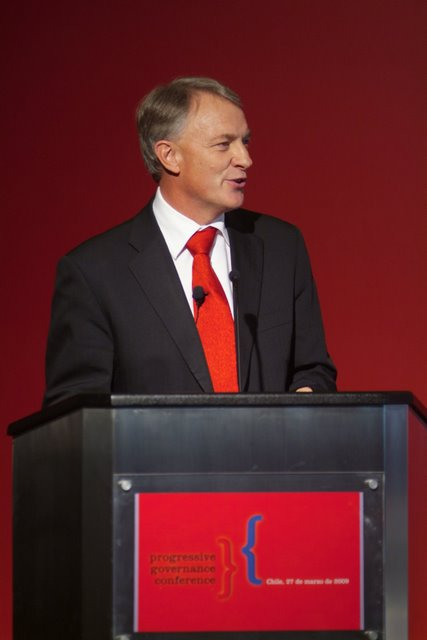
Goff at the Progressive Governance Conference 2009, at Viña del Mar, Chile

At the 2008 election Labour was defeated, and Clark resigned as leader. Goff was widely tipped as her successor. Goff became leader after a special caucus meeting on 11 November 2008 with former senior minister Annette King was elected as deputy leader.

After initial strong popularity, Goff and Labour began to struggle in public opinion polls. A July 2011 poll showed support for the Labour Party at a 10-year low, at just 27%. This followed a leaked policy proposal for a capital gains tax, which the party's critics suggested was unpopular with the electorate. Polls in 2011 also showed an increase in support for the Green Party.

In an October 2010 speech, Goff emphasised the "Kiwi Dream" of high-wage jobs, home ownership and social protection. He criticised the National Government for free-market economic policies that Goff argued were accentuating inequality; he attributed social inequality to societal problems such as drug abuse and obesity.

Both Goff and Prime Minister John Key said that they would not vote in the 2009 corporal punishment referendum. Goff said that the question "Should a smack as part of good parental correction be a criminal offence in New Zealand?" was "absolutely" the wrong question, and that "the question implies that if you vote 'yes' that you're in favour of criminal sanctions being taken against reasonable parents – actually nobody believes that."

In John Key's Statement to Parliament in February 2010, the government announced its consideration of raising Goods and Services Tax from 12.5% to 15%. Goff opposed the raise, saying that "GST increase will hurt families that are already struggling to make ends meet", and the Labour caucus set out on an 'Axe the Tax' nationwide road trip. In May 2010 Goff suggested exempting fresh fruit and vegetables from GST. Key called the exemption of such items "very bureaucratic" and Goff's announcement "desperate".

In February 2010 a discussion document was released, proposing that 7,058 ha of land in national parks be opened up for mining. Outside Parliament Goff told protesters that he and Labour would oppose the proposals "at every stage", and pledged to re-protect any land released from Schedule 4, should his party return to power.

=== Parliamentary career after being leader: 2011–2016 ===
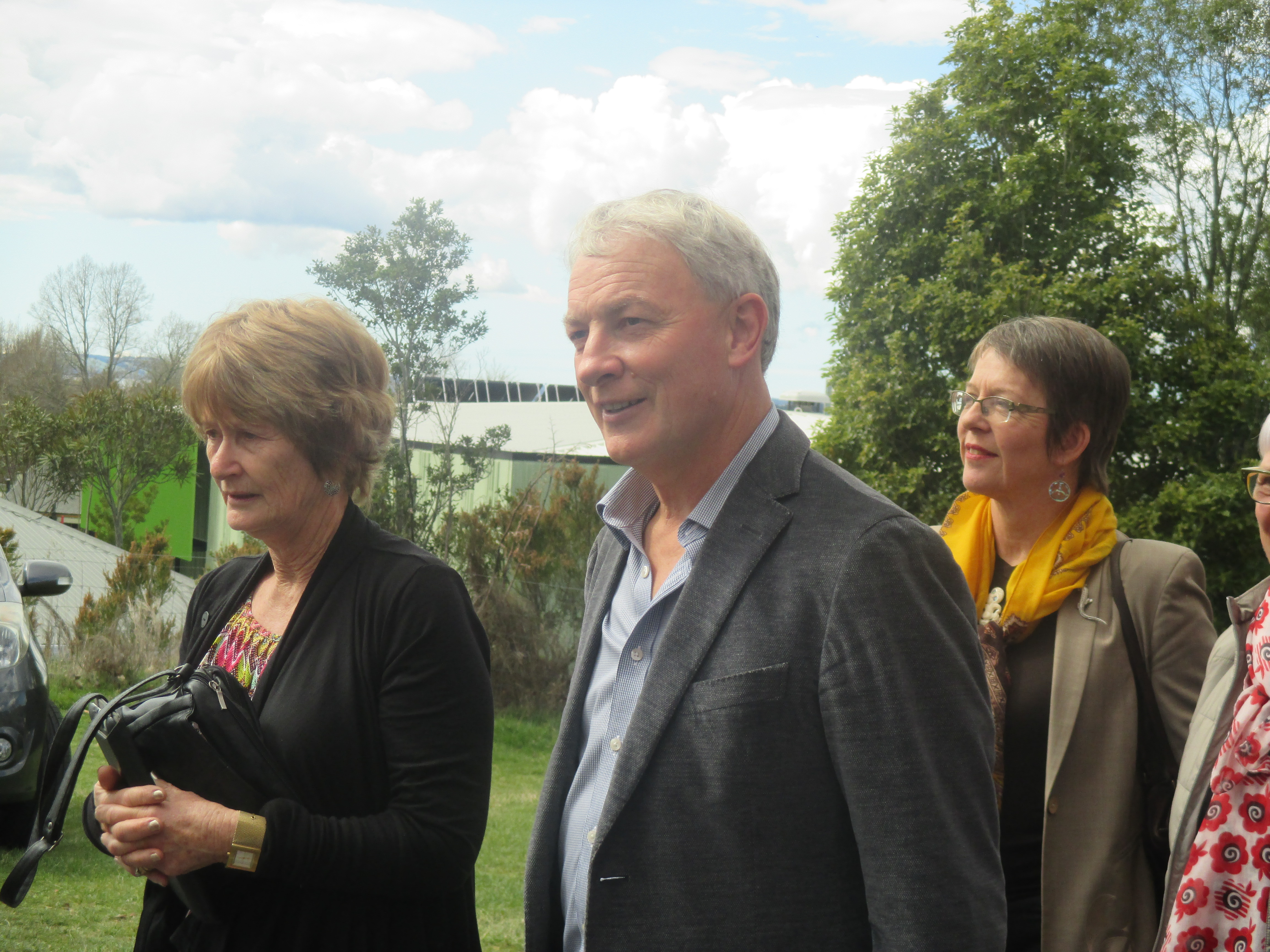
Goff and his wife, Mary (left), with Wellington mayor Celia Wade-Brown (right) in September 2015

On 26 November 2011 the results of the general election were very poor for Labour, which lost 6.86% of the party vote and nine seats. Phil Goff stated that this "wasn't our time this time ... but our time will come again ... we're a bit bloodied but not defeated." Three days after conceding defeat Goff and his deputy, Annette King announced they would be standing down from their leadership positions on 13 December, but would stay on in Parliament as electorate MPs. Goff became the fourth Labour leader, the first since the ousting of Arnold Nordmeyer in 1965, to leave the Labour Party leadership without serving as prime minister. Goff was succeeded as leader by David Shearer, who designated him Labour's spokesperson on foreign affairs. Goff continued in that role until 2013, when he was demoted to be an associate spokesperson on foreign affairs, and spokesperson on trade, defence, and veterans' affairs, by Shearer's successor David Cunliffe. After the 2014 general election, new leader Andrew Little continued Goff in defence and veterans' affairs, and also named him spokesperson for Auckland.

Having won the Auckland mayoralty four days earlier, Goff resigned from Parliament on 12 October 2016, necessitating a by-election in his electorate.

== Mayor of Auckland: 2016–2022 ==
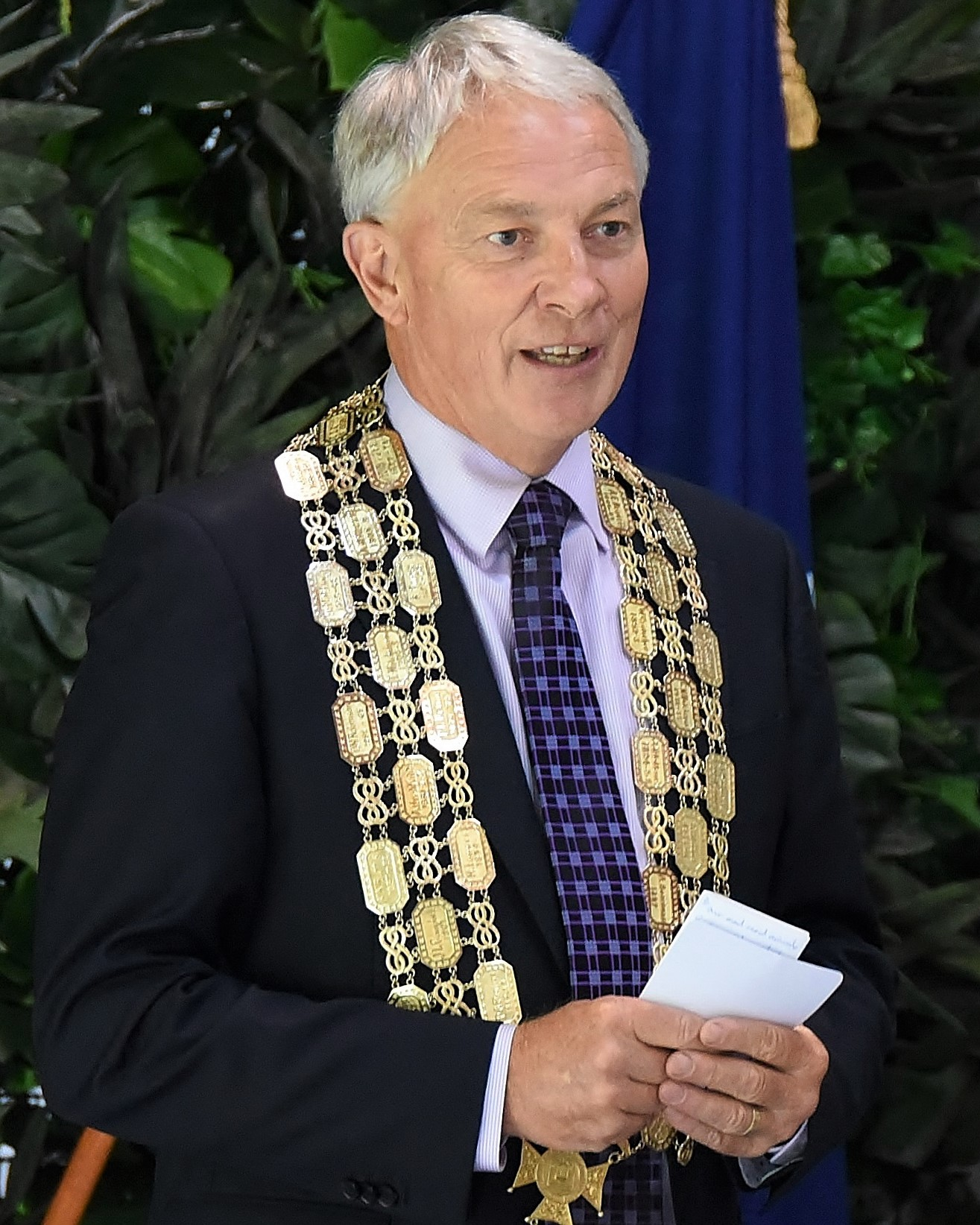
Goff in 2018, wearing the Auckland mayoral chain

On 22 November 2015 Goff announced he would run for Mayor of Auckland in the 2016 mayoral election. Goff won the election, held on 8 October 2016, becoming the second mayor of the Auckland 'super city'.

Goff was sworn in as Mayor of Auckland at a ceremonial event at the Auckland Town Hall on 1 November 2016. He pledged to tackle social issues in Auckland, such as homelessness, so that "no one is left behind"; he also highlighted a need for improved infrastructure and housing availability in order to address the social issues.

=== Proposed Lauren Southern and Stefan Molyneux speaking event ===
In early July 2018, Mayor Goff announced that the Auckland Council would not allow the far right Canadian activists Lauren Southern and Stefan Molyneux to use council premises on the grounds that they stirred up ethnic or religious tensions and promoted divisive views. Southern and Molyneux have drawn controversy in the past for their controversial views on feminism, gender, and Muslim immigration. The pair had booked the Bruce Mason Centre in Auckland's North Shore for a talk on 3 August 2018. While the Auckland Peace Action activist group and the Federation of Islamic Associations of New Zealand had objected to Southern and Molyneux's planned talk, Goff's decision was criticised by the promoter David Pellowe and human rights lawyer Craig Tuck for violating free speech. In addition, The Spinoff contributor and self-described agnostic Muslim Ali Shakir defended the Southern and Molyneux tour and disputed the FIANZ's claim to speak for all Muslims on this matter. New Zealand Deputy Prime Minister and Minister of Foreign Affairs Winston Peters and National Party leader Simon Bridges said they would have supported her right to speak, while Green Party co-leader Marama Davidson said she supported the ban.

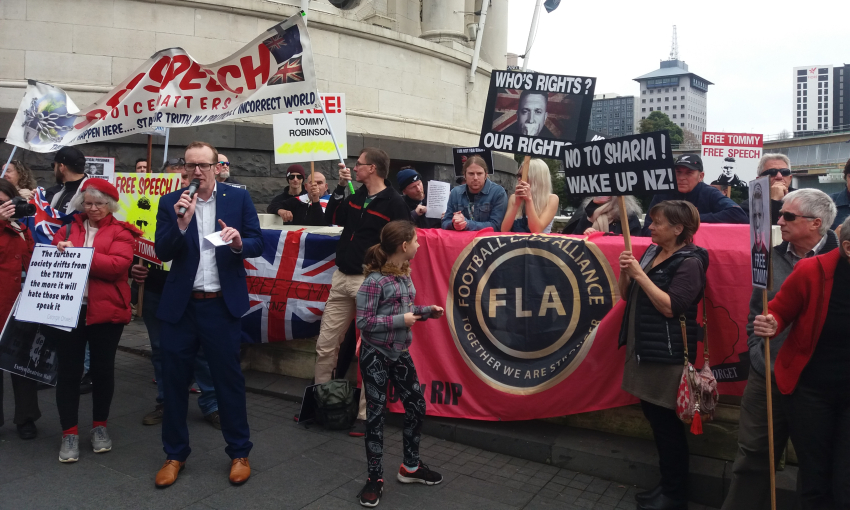
Libertarian politician Stephen Berry speaking at the Free Speech Coalition protest in defence of Southern and Molyneux, Auckland 2018

In response to Goff's decision, a group calling themselves the "Free Speech Coalition" announced that it would be collecting funds for a judicial review of the decision to ban Southern and Molyneux from Council premises. This group consisted of several business leaders, academics, lawyers, and journalists including the former Labour President Michael Bassett, former National and ACT parties leader Don Brash, Property Institute chief executive Ashley Church, Auckland University of Technology historian Paul Moon, left-wing commentator Chris Trotter, and New Zealand Taxpayers' Union Jordan Williams. Within 24 hours, the group had reached its initial fundraising target of NZ$50,000.

On 18 July, Free Speech Coalition spokesperson David Cumin announced that the group had filed legal proceedings against Mayor Goff and the Auckland Council after a failed attempt to broker a deal with Goff and the council to reinstate the speaking event planned by Southern and Molyneux. On 25 July, the Free Speech Coalition withdrew their proceedings against Mayor Goff but warned that further legal action could go ahead. Goff welcomed the development and reiterated his opposition to allowing Council facilities to host events promoting hate speech. The Immigration Minister Iain Lees-Galloway had earlier granted Southern and Molyneux a visa allowing them to visit New Zealand on the grounds that they had not violated any immigration character requirements.

=== Serious Fraud Office investigation, 2020 ===
In late February 2020, the Serious Fraud Office announced that it was investigating an election expenses declaration of cash donations from fundraising auctions of $366,115 filed by Goff during the 2016 mayoral election.

On 7 April 2022, the Serious Fraud Office closed it investigation into Goff's mayoral fundraising campaigns, stating that the matter has been closed. Goff's mayoral campaign welcomed the Office's decision to close the investigation and stated that the matter was resolved.

=== Three Waters reforms ===
In late October 2021, Goff joined several other mayors across New Zealand including Mayor of Christchurch Lianne Dalziel, Mayor of Wellington Andy Foster, Mayor of the Far North District John Carter, and Mayor of Dunedin Aaron Hawkins in opposing the Government's "Three Waters reform programme", which proposes taking away control of water utilities from local councils and placing them under the control of four new entities.

=== 2022 retirement ===
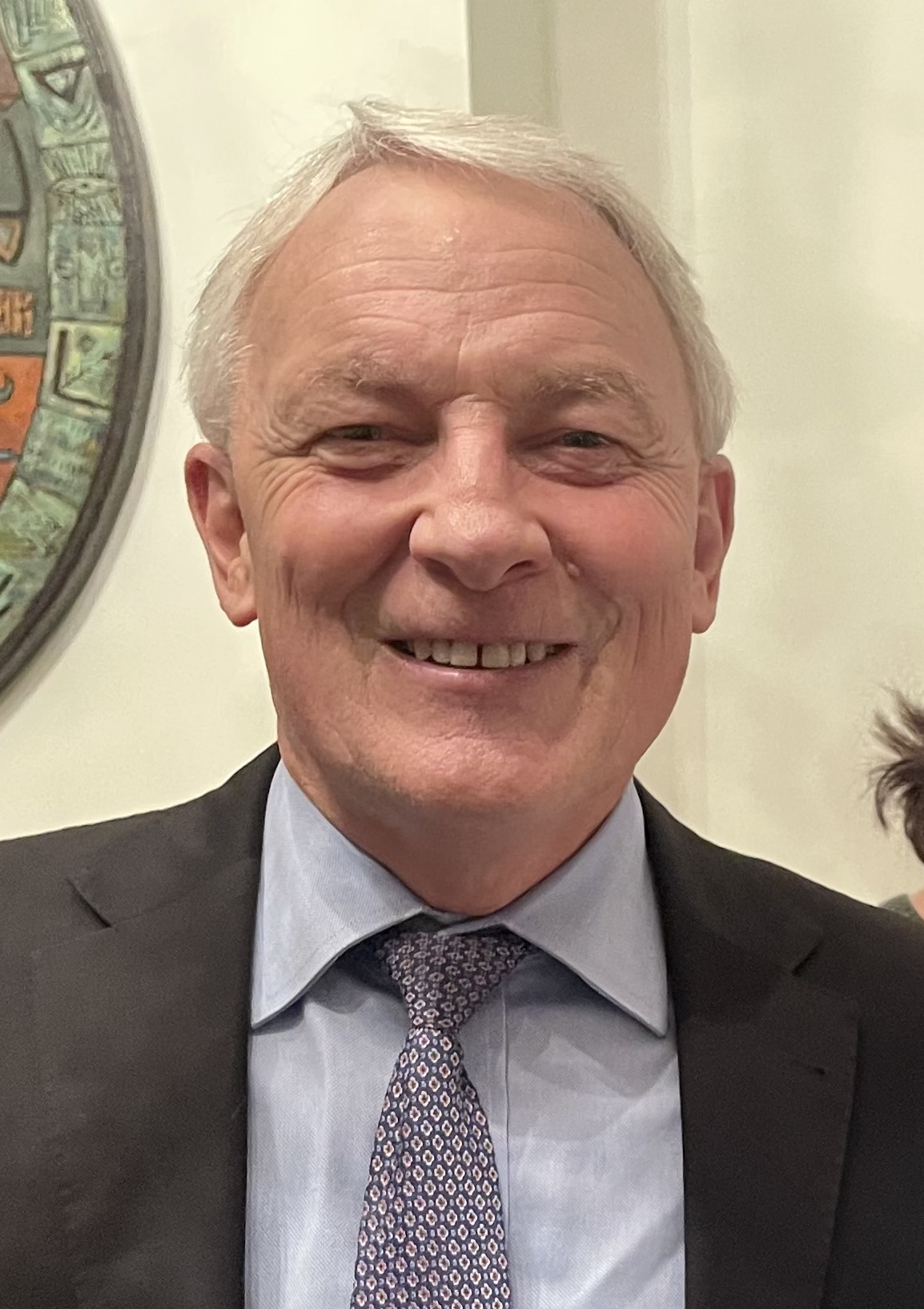
Goff in July 2022

On 14 February 2022, Goff announced that he would not seek re-election for a third term of Auckland mayoralty in September 2022, saying that he intended to retire after 41 years in politics. He stated that it was time to pass the baton on to a new generation, and endorsed Efeso Collins for mayor.

== High commissioner to the United Kingdom: 2023–2025 ==
In October 2022, it was announced that Goff would take up the position of high commissioner of New Zealand to the United Kingdom in January 2023.

In May 2023, Goff caused offence to the Māori King Tūheitia Paki during an official function for the New Zealand delegation in London attending the coronation of King Charles III. Goff forgot to perform a karakia (Māori prayer) and remarked that nobody in the room had experienced a coronation. In response, Ngira Simmonds, a spokesperson for Tūheitia, pointed out that many of the New Zealand delegates had attended two coronations; namely that of King Tūheitia and his mother Queen Dame Te Atairangikaahu. Goff subsequently apologised to Simmonds for not following protocol. Prime Minister Chris Hipkins described Goff's actions as regrettable but reaffirmed his Government's commitment to the Crown–Māori relationship.

On 6 March 2025, New Zealand Foreign Minister Winston Peters dismissed Phil Goff as High Commissioner to the United Kingdom following comments Goff made about current US President Donald Trump. During a Q&A session with Finnish Foreign Minister Elina Valtonen at a Chatham House event in London, Goff had referenced a speech by British wartime leader Winston Churchill criticising British Prime Minister Neville Chamberlain for signing the 1938 Munich Agreement, which facilitated Nazi Germany's annexation of the Sudetenland. Goff said:

"[Churchill] turned to [then UK prime minister Neville] Chamberlain, he said, You had the choice between war and dishonour. You chose dishonour, yet you will have war. President Trump has restored the bust of Churchill to the Oval Office. But do you think he really understands history?"

Valtonen declined to answer Goff's remarks directly but said that Churchill had made many "timeless remarks." Shortly after becoming aware of the remarks, Peters determined that Goff was no longer suitable to represent New Zealand in the United Kingdom. Prime Minister Christopher Luxon supported Peters' decision, describing it as "entirely appropriate." Labour leader Chris Hipkins said that Goff had "overstepped the mark" but added it was a "difficult transition from politics to diplomacy." By contrast, former Labour leader and Prime Minister Helen Clark accused the Government of attempting to placate the Second Trump administration. The recently retired Secretary of Foreign Affairs and Trade Chris Seed was appointed as the interim high commissioner. In late May 2025, Hamish Cooper was named as high commissioner to the United Kingdom; effective September 2025.

In early April 2025, Goff defended his remarks about Trump, telling 1News and Stuff that "New Zealand could not remain silent while the Trump administration made dishonest and untruthful statements about Russia's invasion." Goff said that he was angered by Trump's treatment of Ukrainian President Volodymyr Zelenskyy during an Oval Office meeting in late February 2025.

== Views and positions ==
In late May 2025, Goff criticised Israel's conduct during the Gaza war, arguing that the Israeli government did not care about the civilian death toll.

== Personal life ==
Phil Goff is married to Mary Ellen Goff, whom he met in 1971 and married in 1979. They have three adult children. He lives on an 8-hectare (20-acre) farmlet in the rural Auckland suburb of Clevedon.

== Honours ==
In the 2017 New Year Honours, Goff was appointed a Companion of the New Zealand Order of Merit (CNZM), for services as a member of Parliament.

== Notes ==
New Zealand Parliament
Preceded by Arthur Faulkner	Member of Parliament for Roskill; 1981–1990 1993–1996	Succeeded by Gilbert Myles
Preceded by Gilbert Myles	Member of Parliament for Roskill; 1981–1990 1993–1996	Constituency abolished
Preceded by Jonathan Hunt	Member of Parliament for New Lynn; 1996–1999	Vacant Constituency recreated in 2002 Title next held by David Cunliffe
New constituency	Member of Parliament for Mount Roskill; 1999–2016	Succeeded by Michael Wood
Political offices
Preceded by Len Brown	Mayor of Auckland; 2016–2022	Succeeded by Wayne Brown
Preceded by John Key	Leader of the Opposition; 2008–2011	Succeeded by David Shearer
Preceded by Damien O'Connor	Minister of Corrections; 2007–2008	Succeeded by Judith Collins
Preceded by Mark Burton	Minister of Defence; 2005–2008	Succeeded by Wayne Mapp
Preceded by Don McKinnon	Minister of Foreign Affairs; 1999–2005	Succeeded by Winston Peters
Preceded by Tony Ryall	Minister of Justice; 1999–2005	Succeeded by Mark Burton
Preceded by Geoffrey Palmer	Minister of Education; 1989–1990	Succeeded by Lockwood Smith
Preceded by Kerry Burke	Minister of Employment; 1987–1989	Succeeded by Annette King
Preceded by Mike Moore	Minister of Tourism; 1987–1988	Succeeded by Jonathan Hunt
Preceded by Tony Friedlander	Minister of Housing; 1984–1987	Succeeded by Helen Clark
Party political offices
Preceded by Helen Clark	Leader of the New Zealand Labour Party; 2008–2011	Succeeded by David Shearer
Diplomatic posts
Preceded by Bede Corry	High Commissioner of New Zealand to the United Kingdom; 2023–2025	Vacant
