= Parmjeet Parmar =

New Zealand politician

Parmjeet Parmar MP
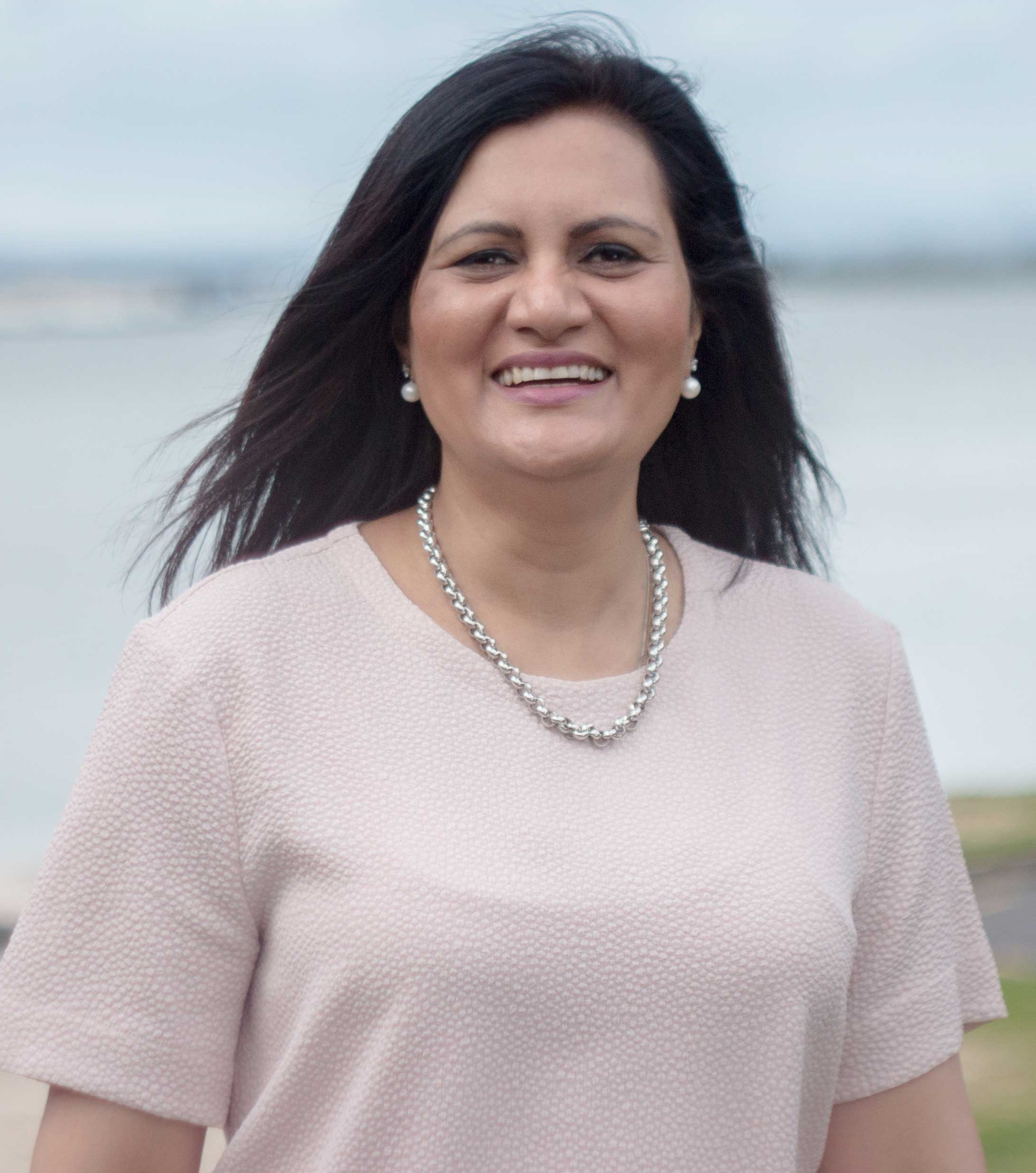

Member of the New Zealand Parliament for ACT party list
- Incumbent
- Assumed office 14 October 2023

Member of the New Zealand Parliament for National Party list
- In office 20 September 2014 – 17 October 2020

Personal details
- Born: 1970 (age 55–56)
- Party: ACT (2023–present); National (before 2023)
- Spouse: Ravinder Parmar
- Children: 2
- Website: http://www.parmjeetparmar.co.nz/
- Scientific career
- Education: University of Pune; University of Auckland (PhD)
- Fields: Biochemistry, neuroscience
- Thesis: Neuroserpin regulates neurite outgrowth in AtT-20 and PC12 cell lines (2003)

Kushmiita Parmjeet Kaur Parmar (born 1970) is a New Zealand politician. She first entered Parliament as a list Member of the New Zealand House of Representatives in the 2014 general election, representing the National Party. After failing to be re-elected in the 2020 general election, Parmar changed allegiance to ACT New Zealand and was elected for that party in the 2023 general election.

Parmar was the first Indian woman to represent a political party in the New Zealand Parliament.

== Early life and career ==
Parmar was born in India where her father served in the Indian Air Force. She completed a master's in biochemistry in India and in 1995 moved to New Zealand to join her husband, with whom she has an arranged marriage. At the University of Auckland, she gained a PhD in biological sciences and the title of her 2003 doctoral thesis was Neuroserpin regulates neurite outgrowth in AtT-20 and PC12 cell lines. She then worked as a scientist.

In 2007, Parmar and her husband became directors of confectionery company, Kiwi Empire Confectionery Limited. She also worked as a current affairs and talkback host on Radio Tarana, and accompanied prime ministers Helen Clark and John Key on their official visits to India as a member of the press.

Parmar held two government appointments prior to becoming a politician. She was appointed as a community representative on the Film and Video Labelling Body in 2012. The following year, she was appointed to the board of the Families Commission (later Superu).

In early 2014, Parmar was photographed wearing a National Party ribbon with John Key at an Auckland event. This fuelled rumors of that Parmar would run in that year's election as a National candidate, and led Labour MP Rajen Prasad (who was also a former chief Families Commissioner) to question whether it was appropriate for Parmar to remain on the Family Commission board. When Parmar was eventually confirmed as a National candidate, she said she would resign from the board immediately.

== Political career ==
New Zealand Parliament
Years	Term	Electorate	List	Party
2014–2017	51st	List	48	National
2017–2020	52nd	List	34	National
2023–2026	54th	List	9	ACT
2026–present	55th	List	10	ACT

=== First term, 2014–2017 ===
Parmar was announced as a National Party candidate in June 2014. She contested the Mount Roskill electorate at the 2014 election and came second place after Labour's candidate Phil Goff. Ranked at 48 on National's party list, she was elected as a list MP. Goff retired in 2016; Parmar unsuccessfully contested Mount Roskill against Labour's Michael Wood in the subsequent by-election, and again at the 2017 general election where she was returned as a list MP.

In her maiden speech of 28 October 2014, Parmar stated her values of "strong, caring families and communities, personal responsibility, and equal citizenship and opportunities" and set out her priorities for the science sector and small businesses. In her first term, during the final three years of the Fifth National Government, Parmar was a member of the social services committee and transport and industrial relations committee. In 2017, she was briefly deputy chair of the transport and industrial relations committee.

Parmar’s member’s bill, the Newborn Enrolment with General Practice Bill, was introduced on 10 May 2017. The bill, which proposed to require newborns to be enrolled with a general practice before the age of 6 months, passed its first reading with support of all parties and was referred to the health committee. At its second reading in mid-2018, the bill was voted down with members in the majority arguing that enrolment of newborns with general practices is already required without legislation.

=== Second term, 2017–2020 ===
In her second term, when National formed the official opposition, Parmar was appointed the party's spokesperson for research, science and innovation from 2017 to 2020, as an associate spokesperson for economic development from 2018 to 2020, and as spokesperson for statistics in 2020. She was a member of the economic development, science and innovation committee from 2017 to 2018 and chair of the education and workforce committee from 2018 to 2020. As science and innovation spokesperson, Parmar advocated for more certainty of funding for fire research in light of Port Hills and Nelson fires and for financial security for Crown Research Institutes. She supported legislative change to enable gene-editing as a means to reduce greenhouse gas emissions.

Parmar's second member's bill, the Patents (Advancement Patents) Amendment Bill, was debated in August 2018. It proposed to create a second-tier patent with lesser eligibility requirements and protection compared to the standard patent. The bill attracted attention from local patent attorneys, the software industry, and from overseas jurisdictions but was ultimately unsuccessful at its first reading.

Parmar worked with a Mt Roskill local amenity, Stardome Observatory, to help fix an issue that all Auckland Regional Amenities faced in regards to their financial reporting requirements. Parmar sponsored a private bill, the Auckland Regional Amenities Funding Amendment Bill, which was supported by all parties and became law on 2 July 2020.

In response to comments by New Zealand First MP Shane Jones in which he stated that immigrants that criticised immigration policies should "catch the first plane home," Parmar sent a letter to Prime Minister Jacinda Ardern expressing her concerns. On the 150th anniversary of Mahatma Gandhi's birth, Parmar ran a petition for his statue to be installed in Auckland to acknowledge his legacy. At the time of launching her petition, she said "that a statue of Mahatma Gandhi is not just about India and New Zealand, and/or Indians in New Zealand, it is about honouring his legacy – the legacy that is ever lasting and is influencing civilised societies all around the world."

Parmar was defeated in Mount Roskill at the 2020 election and the National Party did not win enough support for her to return as a list MP. She sought the National candidacy in Mount Roskill, Upper Harbour, and Maungakiekie ahead of the 2023 general election but was not selected.

=== Third term, 2023–2026 ===
On 31 May 2023, Parmar announced her return to politics, switching her party affiliation from National to ACT. That same day, she was confirmed as the ACT candidate for Pakuranga. In July, ACT placed her ninth on its party list.

During the 2023 New Zealand general election held on 14 October, Parmar was elected to Parliament on the ACT party list. She also came third place in the Pakuranga electorate, gaining 1,298 votes.

As ACT's education spokesperson, Parmar objected to the University of Auckland's designated safe spaces for Māori and Pasifika students in late March 2024. She argued that the policy was racially discriminatory, divisive and failed to address historical injustices faced by ethnic minorities in New Zealand. On 24 March 2025, Parmar criticised the University of Auckland's compulsory Waipapa Taumata Rau first year course, which focuses on Māori culture and the Treaty of Waitangi. She said that a course focusing on New Zealand-specific history and culture would be of little benefit to engineering or business students, and said that it should be an elective course rather than a compulsory one.

In late March 2025, Parmar introduced a member's bill seeking to ban universities from offering services based on ethnicity including scholarships, financial assistance, accommodation, housing and designated university facilities.

In April 2026, Parmar was the target of a controversial haka (Ka Mate) performed by former Te Pāti Māori President Che Wilson at the Tainui Regional Kapa Haka Competition which included the phrase "purari karikari iniana" (lit."bloody Indian curry" in Māori), and mimicked Indian accents and cultural religious practices. In response to media coverage, Parmar described the performance as "deeply troubling" and said that Indian New Zealanders deserved to be treated with "dignity." She also issued a statement condemning racism as unacceptable irrespective of "who it comes from or who it is directed at." While Wilson defended the haka as a response to what he alleged was Parmar and her party's anti-Māori policies and rhetoric, the performing arts body Te Matatini and broadcaster Whakaata Māori removed video footage of Wilson's haka from their websites and social media platforms. The Indian-Māori researcher Jessica Hutchings, indigenous rights advocate Tina Ngata, The Spinoff editor Liam Rātana and the anti-racism group People's Action Plan Against Racism also condemned Wilson's haka performance while also expressing disagreement with ACT's policies towards Māori.

In June 2026, Parmar confirmed that she had written to the Police Commissioner tasking the Police to investigate whether Brian Tamaki broke the law over his social media remarks about purging non-Christians. She believed that his remarks "cross the line" and could "incite crime."

=== Fourth term, 2026–present ===
During the 2026 New Zealand general election, Parmar was ranked tenth place on the ACT party list and contested the Pakuranga electorate. On 7 November, Parmar came fourth place in Pakuranga with 981 votes, based on preliminary results. She was re-elected to Parliament on the ACT party list.

== Personal life ==
While still living in India, Parmar's family arranged for her to marry Ravinder Parmar, who was a New Zealand citizen. They have two sons.
