= Minister for Auckland =

New Zealand Minister of the Crown

- Coat of Arms of New Zealand

- Flag of New Zealand

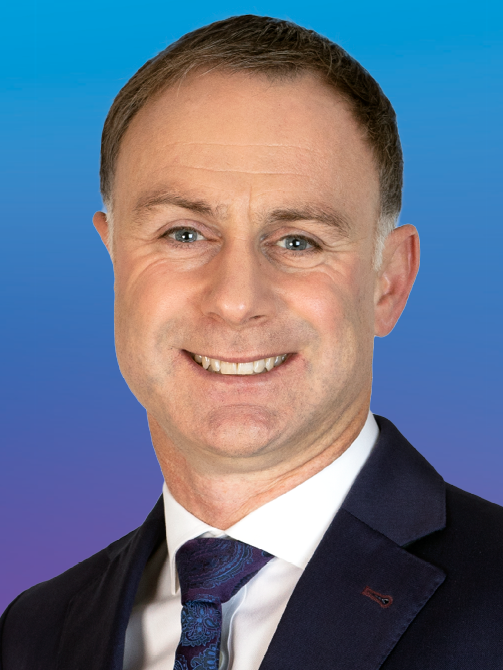
- Incumbent; Simon Watts since 7 April 2026
- Ministry of Business, Innovation and Employment
- Style: The Honourable
- Member of: Cabinet of New Zealand; Executive Council
- Reports to: Prime Minister of New Zealand
- Appointer: Governor-General of New Zealand
- Term length: At His Majesty's pleasure
- Formation: 10 December 1999
- First holder: Judith Tizard
- Salary: $288,900
- Website: www.beehive.govt.nz

Minister for Auckland is a minister in the New Zealand Government with responsibility over issues concerning Auckland, first created by Prime Minister Helen Clark in 1999 and reinstated by Chris Hipkins in 2023. The first minister was Judith Tizard, and the current minister is Simon Watts.

== History ==
=== Resident Minister for Auckland ===
After Wellington became capital of New Zealand in 1865, with the seat of government moving from Auckland to the new capital, some of the government ministries appointed an agent at Auckland. This was sometimes referred to as "Resident Minister for Auckland" in the contemporary media. This was not a ministerial appointment, but instead a paid role for the government. Daniel Pollen held the role twice (1868–1869 and 1870–1873) and on both occasions, he resigned from the Legislative Council so that he could take on this role. Confusingly, the 1869–1872 Fox Ministry appointed William Reeves as Resident Minister for Middle Island (December 1871 – September 1872) and unlike the Auckland role, that was a ministerial appointment.

=== Fifth Labour Government (1999–2008) ===
Under Prime Minister Helen Clark, Judith Tizard first held the portfolio as "Minister assisting the Prime Minister on Auckland issues" from December 1999 until August 2002 until it was changed to "Minister for Auckland Issues", which she held from August 2002 until October 2007.

=== Sixth Labour Government (2017–2023) ===
After a 15-year hiatus on the existence of a Minister for Auckland, newly elected Prime Minister Chris Hipkins, in his first cabinet designated Michael Wood as Minister for Auckland on 31 January 2023. Prime Minister Chris Hipkins stated that "When Auckland succeeds, the country succeeds. I know that the last few years have been particularly tough for the City of Sails" as a justification for his appointment.

After controversies arose around conflicts of interest surrounding Michael Wood as the Minister for Transport, and further information was found about Michael Wood's supposed refusal on multiple occasions to declare conflicts of interests, he decided to step down as a Cabinet Minister after widespread pressure.

Deputy Prime Minister Carmel Sepuloni was subsequently given the portfolio of Minister for Auckland after the controversy on 21 June 2023.

== List of ministers ==
Key

Labour National

No.	Name	Portrait	Term of Office		Prime Minister
As Minister assisting the Prime Minister on Auckland issues
1	Judith Tizard		10 December 1999	15 August 2002	Clark
As Minister for Auckland Issues
(1)	Judith Tizard		15 August 2002	31 October 2007	Clark
As Minister for Auckland
2	Michael Wood		1 February 2023	21 June 2023	Hipkins
3	Carmel Sepuloni		21 June 2023	27 November 2023	Hipkins
4	Simeon Brown		27 November 2023	7 April 2026	Luxon
5	Simon Watts		7 April 2026	present	Luxon
