= Carmel Sepuloni =

New Zealand politician (born 1977)

The Honourable Carmel Sepuloni MP
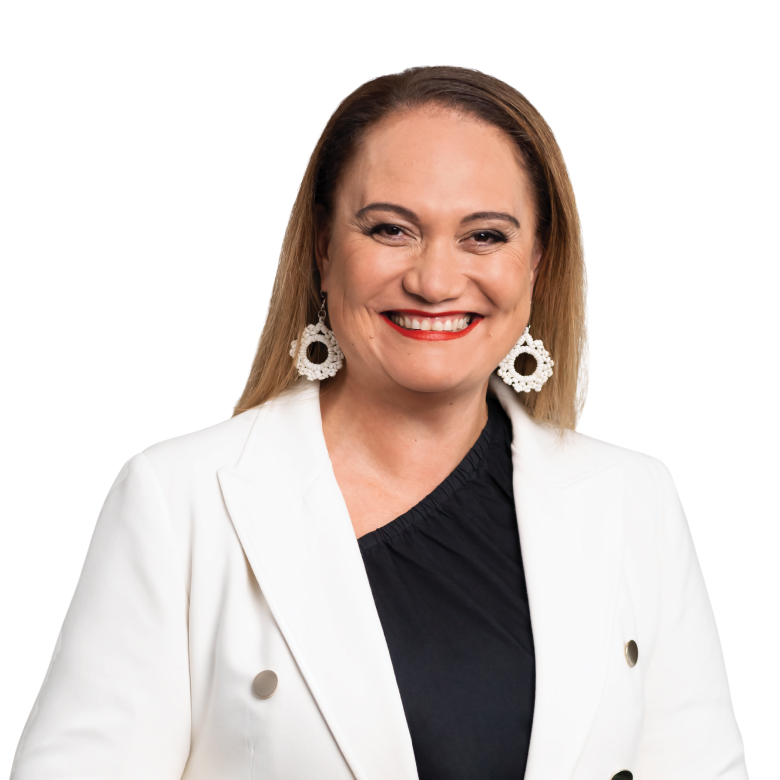
- Sepuloni in 2023

Deputy Leader of the Opposition
- Incumbent
- Assumed office 27 November 2023
- Leader: Chris Hipkins
- Preceded by: Nicola Willis

19th Deputy Leader of the Labour Party
- Incumbent
- Assumed office 7 November 2023
- Leader: Chris Hipkins
- Preceded by: Kelvin Davis

20th Deputy Prime Minister of New Zealand
- In office 25 January 2023 – 27 November 2023
- Prime Minister: Chris Hipkins
- Preceded by: Grant Robertson
- Succeeded by: Winston Peters

5th Minister for Workplace Relations and Safety
- In office 21 June 2023 – 27 November 2023
- Prime Minister: Chris Hipkins
- Preceded by: Michael Wood
- Succeeded by: Brooke Van Velden

3rd Minister for Auckland
- In office 21 June 2023 – 27 November 2023
- Prime Minister: Chris Hipkins
- Preceded by: Michael Wood
- Succeeded by: Simeon Brown

27th Minister for Social Development
- In office 26 October 2017 – 27 November 2023
- Prime Minister: Jacinda Ardern; Chris Hipkins
- Preceded by: Anne Tolley
- Succeeded by: Louise Upston

14th Minister for ACC
- In office 22 July 2020 – 1 February 2023
- Prime Minister: Jacinda Ardern; Chris Hipkins
- Preceded by: Iain Lees-Galloway
- Succeeded by: Peeni Henare

13th Minister for Arts, Culture and Heritage
- In office 6 November 2020 – 27 November 2023
- Prime Minister: Jacinda Ardern; Chris Hipkins
- Preceded by: Jacinda Ardern
- Succeeded by: Paul Goldsmith

Member of the New Zealand Parliament for Kelston
- Incumbent
- Assumed office 21 September 2014
- Preceded by: Electorate established
- Majority: 15,660

Personal details
- Born: Carmel Jean Sepuloni; 1977 (age 48–49) Waitara, New Zealand
- Party: Labour
- Spouse: Daren Kamali (m. 2018)
- Children: 2
- Education: University of Auckland

Carmel Jean Sepuloni (born 1977) is a New Zealand politician who served as the 20th deputy prime minister of New Zealand. A member of the Labour Party, she was first elected to Parliament in 2008 for a three-year term as a list Member of Parliament (MP), and was re-elected as MP for Kelston in 2014. In 2023, she was elected as the deputy leader of the Labour Party, succeeding Kelvin Davis.

Sepuloni is New Zealand's first MP of Tongan descent. She was a senior minister in the Sixth Labour Government under Prime Minister Jacinda Ardern, holding office as Minister for Social Development throughout the government's term, and additionally serving as Minister for Arts, Culture, and Heritage, Minister for ACC, Minister for Workplace Relations and Safety, Minister for Disability Issues, and Minister for Pacific Peoples. She became deputy prime minister in January 2023, when the Labour leadership switched to Chris Hipkins.

== Early years ==
Sepuloni was born and raised in Waitara, Taranaki, and attended New Plymouth Girls' High School. Her father was a Samoan-Tongan migrant freezing worker, who migrated to New Zealand without being able to speak English, and "staunch unionist" and her mother was a Pākehā from a conservative farming family.

She moved to Auckland in 1996 to attend the Auckland College of Education and University of Auckland where she attained a Diploma of Teaching (Primary) and a Bachelor of Education, respectively. She also holds a Postgraduate Diploma in Education. Sepuloni worked as a teacher in Samoa and in alternative education programmes in Auckland. Later, she worked as an equity manager and a research project manager in Pacific health at the University of Auckland.

She has two sons. She married writer and musician Daren Kamali in November 2018.

== Member of Parliament ==
New Zealand Parliament
Years	Term	Electorate	List	Party
2008–2011	49th	List	35	Labour
2014–2017	51st	Kelston	29	Labour
2017–2020	52nd	Kelston	8	Labour
2020–2023	53rd	Kelston	8	Labour
2023–2026	54th	Kelston	3	Labour
2026–present	55th	Glendene	2	Labour

=== First term, 2008–2011 ===
Sepuloni came to Parliament in the 2008 general election having successfully stood as a list-only candidate for the New Zealand Labour Party. She had been involved in the party for only a year and a half before being elected. Sepuloni's position at 35th on the party list, and the promotion of other new candidates, was cited by The New Zealand Herald as an effort by the Labour Party to "inject new faces" and increase the party's ethnic diversity.

After the election, Sepuloni became Labour's spokesperson for civil defence and associate spokesperson for tertiary education and social development. In her maiden speech, Sepuloni said, "I've learned through my own experiences and the experiences of others around me, that our young in particular can quickly begin to self-stigmatise when the media and society stigmatise them. When the media only portrays a picture of a ghettoised, poverty-stricken group of trouble makers, then our youth can resign themselves to the fact that this is what they are. They may even take pride in this prescribed image, because it provides them with a level of attention and status which although negative, is attention and status nonetheless."

In June 2010, Sepuloni's Employment Relations (Probationary Period Repeal) Amendment Bill was drawn from the member's ballot. A bill to repeal the changes to probationary employment contained in the Employment Relations Amendment Act 2008, it was defeated at its first reading 64 votes to 57.

=== 2011 election loss ===
On 19 March 2010, Sepuloni was selected as the Labour candidate for the Waitakere electorate in the 2011 general election, facing incumbent National MP and Cabinet minister Paula Bennett. In April 2011, she was ranked number 24 on the party's list for the election. On the election night preliminary count, she placed second in Waitakere, 349 votes behind Bennett, and with her list ranking was set not to be returned to Parliament. When the official results were released on 10 December 2011, Sepuloni had received sufficient special votes to win Waitakere and defeat Bennett by eleven votes. Bennett requested a judicial recount and on 17 December regained her seat with a nine-vote majority, removing Sepuloni from Parliament. This was not before the Labour Party leadership election on 13 December, in which she participated as a member-elect of the Labour caucus and supported David Cunliffe.

Not long after leaving Parliament Sepuloni travelled to Egypt to participate as a short-term observer on the NDI International Election Mission. Prior to being reelected, Sepuloni was employed as the chief executive of Vaka Tautua, an Auckland-based Pacific disability, mental health, and social services provider.

=== Second term, 2014–2017 ===
During the 2014 general election, Sepuloni stood as Labour's candidate in the Kelston electorate in Auckland, winning by a majority of 15,091 votes. She served as Labour's social development spokesperson under new Labour leader Andrew Little, although she was temporarily stood down from that role in 2015 after her mother was charged with benefit fraud; her mother was subsequently sentenced to four and a half months of home detention for illegally receiving benefits totalling $34,000.

=== Government minister, 2017–2023 ===
During the 2017 general election, Sepuloni stood again in her Kelston seat, returning to Parliament with a majority of 16,789 votes. Following Labour's formation of a coalition government with New Zealand First and the Greens, Sepuloni was elected as a Cabinet minister by the Labour Party caucus. She was subsequently appointed as minister of social development and disability issues as well as associate minister for Pacific Peoples, and arts, culture & heritage.

On 28 April 2018, Sepuloni issued a statement criticising Work and Income for turning away a homeless woman who was trying to apply for a benefit after being discharged from hospital. As social development minister, Sepuloni likened her Government's approach to welfare reform to "trying to turn a jumbo jet in mid-air."

On 22 July 2020, Sepuloni was appointed as minister for ACC following the resignation of Iain Lees-Galloway, who admitted to having an "inappropriate relationship" with a former staffer.

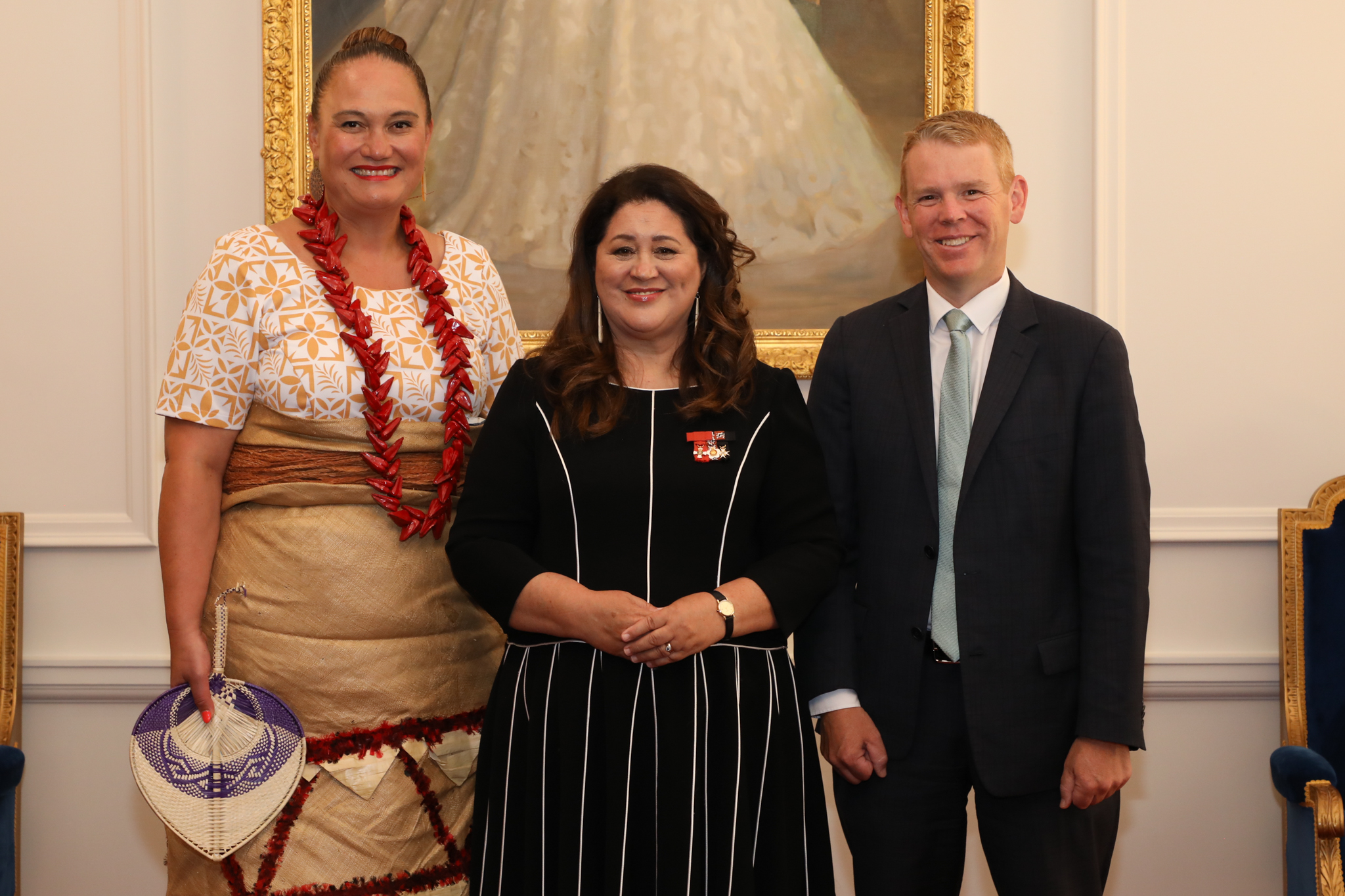
Sepuloni (left) and Chris Hipkins (right), after being sworn in as deputy prime minister and prime minister, by the governor-general, Dame Cindy Kiro, at Government House, Wellington, on 25 January 2023

During the 2020 general election held on 17 October, Sepuloni was re-elected in Kelston by a final margin of 15,660 votes, retaining the seat for Labour. In early November, she retained her previous ministerial portfolios for social development, disability issues, and ACC, while also becoming the minister for employment and arts, culture and heritage. She vacated the disability issues portfolio in June 2022.

On 22 January 2023, incoming prime minister Chris Hipkins confirmed Sepuloni as his deputy prime minister. She is the first Pasifika deputy prime minister and third woman to hold the role. On her promotion to deputy prime minister, Sepuloni dropped the ACC portfolio and became the associate foreign affairs minister responsible for the Pacific region. She additionally became Minister for Workplace Relations and Safety and Minister for Auckland on 21 June 2023, following the resignation of Michael Wood from cabinet.

=== Fifth term, 2023–2026 ===
Sepuloni retained her Kelston electorate at the 2023 New Zealand general election by a margin of 4,396 votes despite Labour losing the election to the National Party.

On 7 November 2023, Sepuloni was elected as deputy leader of the Labour Party during a leadership vote. In early November 2023, along with the National Party's foreign affairs spokesperson Gerry Brownlee, she represented New Zealand at the 2023 Pacific Islands Forum. She also attended a leaders' retreat in Aitutaki.

In late November 2023, she became Deputy Leader of the Opposition and spokesperson for social development, Pacific Peoples, Auckland issues, and child poverty reduction in the Shadow Cabinet of Chris Hipkins. On 5 December 2023, Sepuloni was granted retention of the title The Honourable, in recognition of her term as a member of the Executive Council.

Following a cabinet reshuffle in early March 2025, Sepuloni retained the Pacific Peoples and Auckland Issues portfolios, and also gained the Women portfolio. She lost the social development and child poverty reduction portfolios.

=== Sixth term, 2026–present ===
During the 2026 New Zealand general election, Sepuloni was ranked second on the Labour Party list. She contested the Glendene electorate. On 7 November, Sepuloni retained Glendene for Labour by a large margin of 6,940 votes, based on preliminary results.

New Zealand Parliament
New constituency	Member of Parliament for Kelston; 2014–present	Incumbent
Political offices
Preceded by Nicky Wagner	Minister for Disability Issues; 2017–2022	Succeeded by Poto Williams
Preceded by Anne Tolley	Minister for Social Development; 2017–2023	Succeeded by Louise Upston
Preceded by Iain Lees-Galloway	Minister for ACC; 2020–2023	Succeeded by Peeni Henare
Preceded by Jacinda Ardern	Minister for Arts, Culture and Heritage; 2020–2023	Succeeded by Paul Goldsmith
Preceded by Grant Robertson	Deputy Prime Minister of New Zealand; 2023	Succeeded by Winston Peters
