= Mount Roskill (electorate) =

- Single-member general constituency for the New Zealand House of Representatives
- Interactive map of boundaries from the 2026 election
- Formation: 1999
- Region: Auckland
- Character: Urban and suburban
- Term: 3 years

Member for Mount Roskill
- TBD
- Previous MP: Michael Wood (Labour)
Party vote distribution

Mount Roskill is a parliamentary electorate in Auckland, New Zealand, returning one Member of Parliament (MP) to the New Zealand House of Representatives. Phil Goff of the Labour Party held the seat from the 1999 election until he resigned from Parliament on 12 October 2016 after contesting and being elected Mayor of Auckland on 8 October 2016 in the 2016 mayoral election. His resignation necessitated a byelection in this electorate which was won by Michael Wood. Carlos Cheung of the New Zealand National Party defeated Wood in the 2023 New Zealand general election.

Based on preliminary results, Labour's Wood has won the 2026 general election, 262 ahead of National's Cheung, but the result may change with the final vote count expected for 27 November.

== Population centres ==
Map of boundaries at the 2020 and 2023 general elections

Mount Roskill is located on the western side of the Auckland isthmus, bordering the Manukau Harbour. It is anchored around the suburbs of Mount Roskill, Three Kings, Hillsborough, Waikōwhai, and a large section of Balmoral. The 2008 election boundaries added in Lynfield and New Windsor at the expense of Onehunga, which returned to the Maungakiekie electorate after being cut out in 1999. At the 2020 redistribution it gained New Windsor from New Lynn at the expense of Royal Oak, which moved to Maungakiekie. In the 2025 boundary review, the electorate would gain the suburb of Blockhouse Bay from New Lynn while transferring Balmoral, Sandringham and Wesley to Mt Albert.

The Mount Roskill electorate is working class and multi-ethnic, with a high Pacific Island and Asian population compared to the national average. 52.8% of the population were born overseas - fourth highest percentage in the country, and 48.6% are of Asian ethnicity - the highest percentage in the country. The electorate also contains the highest proportion of New Zealanders that are practitioners of Hinduism and Islam, as of 2021.

== History ==
The 1996 New Zealand census showed population growth in the north and west of Auckland, necessitating the redistribution of electorates for the 1999 election. The existing New Lynn seat was renamed Titirangi, with its boundaries shifted to fall in between Auckland and Waitakere cities. The eastern side of the New Lynn residential area was amalgamated with the population excess of Epsom, the southern half of Owairaka seat (which was itself renamed Mount Albert) and the western end of Maungakiekie to form a new seat. Named Mount Roskill, it was the first new seat drawn since the introduction of Mixed Member Proportional voting three years previous.

So far there have been three MPs for Mount Roskill, two from the Labour Party, and one from the National Party. Labour's Phil Goff was the first representative, having previously held New Lynn, another electorate in Auckland, and Roskill, an electorate covering much of the same area as Mount Roskill. After Goff was elected Mayor of Auckland in October 2016, a by-election date was set for 3 December 2016. Labour candidate Michael Wood won the by-election with more than half the votes.

Carlos Cheung won the seat for the first time for the National Party in the 2023 New Zealand general election, defeating former Minister and incumbent MP Michael Wood with a 22-point swing. In the 2026 general election, Labour's Wood won the electorate based on preliminary results, but The New Zealand Herald considers this as one of five electorates where the result may change with the final vote count expected for 27 November. Wood is ahead of National's Cheung by 262 votes.

=== Members of Parliament ===
Key

Labour National

Election	Winner
1999 election	Phil Goff
2002 election	Phil Goff
2005 election	Phil Goff
2008 election	Phil Goff
2011 election	Phil Goff
2014 election	Phil Goff
2016 by-election	Michael Wood
2017 election	Michael Wood
2020 election	Michael Wood
2023 election	Carlos Cheung
2026 election	Michael Wood (provisional)

=== List MPs ===
Members of Parliament elected from party lists in elections where that person also unsuccessfully contested the Mount Roskill electorate. Unless otherwise stated, all MPs terms began and ended at general elections.

Key

United Future National Green NZ First

Election	Winner
2002 election	Bernie Ogilvy
2004	Kenneth Wang^{1}
2005 election	Jackie Blue^{2}
2008 election	Jackie Blue^{2}
2011 election	Jackie Blue^{2}
2011 election	Julie Anne Genter
2014 election	Mahesh Bindra
2014 election	Parmjeet Parmar
2016	Barry Coates^{3}
2017 election	Parmjeet Parmar
2020 election	Golriz Ghahraman

^{1}Wang was elected from the party list in November 2004 following the expulsion of Donna Awatere Huata.
^{2}Blue resigned from Parliament on 20 May 2013.
^{3}Coates was elected from the party list in October 2016 following the resignation of Kevin Hague.

== Election results ==
=== 2026 election ===
The next election were held on 7 November 2026. Candidates for Mount Roskill are listed at Candidates in the 2026 New Zealand general election by electorate § Mount Roskill. Official results will be available after 27 November 2026.

=== 2023 election ===
2023 general election: Mount Roskill
Notes:	Blue background denotes the winner of the electorate vote. Pink background denotes a candidate elected from their party list. Yellow background denotes an electorate win by a list member, or other incumbent. A ✓ or ✗ denotes status of any incumbent, win or lose respectively.						
Party	Candidate	Votes	%	±%	Party votes	%	±%
National	Carlos Cheung	15,659	43.30	+19.22	15,828	43.09	+18.86
Labour	✗ Michael Wood	14,095	38.97	−21.39	10,959	29.83	−25.87
Green	Suveen Sanis Walgampola	3,379	9.34	+3.42	4,422	12.04	+4.09
ACT	Rahul Chopra	2,179	6.03	+2.44	2,227	6.06	+1.12
NZ First					1,294	3.52	+1.63
Opportunities					765	2.08	+0.79
Te Pāti Māori					289	0.79	+0.43
NewZeal					196	0.53	
NZ Loyal					131	0.37	
Legalise Cannabis					97	0.26	+0.09
Freedoms NZ					93	0.25	
New Conservatives					67	0.18	−1.01
Animal Justice					49	0.13	
Women's Rights					24	0.07	
DemocracyNZ					20	0.05	
New Nation					9	0.02	
Leighton Baker Party					4	0.01	
Informal votes		856			256		
Total valid votes		36,168			36,730		
National gain from Labour	Majority	1,564	4.33				

=== 2020 election ===
2020 general election: Mount Roskill
Notes:	Blue background denotes the winner of the electorate vote. Pink background denotes a candidate elected from their party list. Yellow background denotes an electorate win by a list member, or other incumbent. A ✓ or ✗ denotes status of any incumbent, win or lose respectively.						
Party	Candidate	Votes	%	±%	Party votes	%	±%
Labour	✓ Michael Wood	23,050	60.36	+6.01	21,436	55.70	+13.27
National	Parmjeet Parmar	9,197	24.08	−10.63	9,328	24.23	−18.52
Green	Golriz Ghahraman	2,261	5.92	+2.36	2,205	7.95	+1.77
ACT	Chris Johnston	1,371	3.59	—	1,904	4.94	+4.36
New Conservative	Alister Hood	610	1.59	+0.85	459	1.19	+0.94
Advance NZ	Anil Sharma	257	0.67	—	198	0.51	—
TEA	Vishal Choksi	254	0.66	—	163	0.42	—
ONE	Charlene Roxanne Pehi	143	0.37	—	103	0.26	—
Social Credit	Cliff Hall	87	0.22	—	18	0.04	—
Voice of the People	Warwick Frederikson	45	0.11	—			
NZ First					731	1.89	−2.51
Opportunities					499	1.29	−0.44
Māori Party					142	0.36	−0.10
Legalise Cannabis					68	0.17	—
Vision NZ					19	0.04	—
Sustainable NZ					18	0.04	—
Outdoors					13	0.03	−0.01
Heartland					3	0.01	—
Informal votes		912			321		
Total valid votes		38,187			38,483		
Turnout		38,749	76.51	+1.94			
Labour hold	Majority	13,853	36.37	+16.64			

=== 2017 election ===
2017 general election: Mount Roskill
Notes:	Blue background denotes the winner of the electorate vote. Pink background denotes a candidate elected from their party list. Yellow background denotes an electorate win by a list member, or other incumbent. A ✓ or ✗ denotes status of any incumbent, win or lose respectively.						
Party	Candidate	Votes	%	±%	Party votes	%	±%
Labour	✓ Michael Wood	19,094	54.35	−12.16	15,135	42.43	+6.98
National	Parmjeet Parmar	12,196	34.71	+7.41	15,248	42.75	−0.88
Green	Ricardo Menéndez March	1,254	3.56	—	2,205	6.18	−3.44
NZ First	Mahesh Bindra	846	2.40	—	1,572	4.40	−0.89
Opportunities	Clint Ulyatt	564	1.60	—	618	1.73	—
Conservative	Kathryn Davie	263	0.74	—	90	0.25	−3.41
Māori Party	John Kiria	245	0.69	—	167	0.46	+0.07
Democrats	Andrew Leitch	56	0.15	−0.57	13	0.03	±0.00
Independent	Bishrul Hafi Ameer Izadeen	35	0.09	—			
ACT					207	0.58	−1.21
People's Party					80	0.22	—
Legalise Cannabis					62	0.17	−0.05
United Future					24	0.06	−0.14
Outdoors					16	0.04	—
Mana					9	0.02	—
Ban 1080					4	0.01	−0.04
Internet					4	0.01	—
Informal votes		575			213		
Total valid votes		35,128			35,667		
Turnout		35,667	74.57				
Labour hold	Majority	6,898	19.63				

=== 2016 by-election ===
The following table shows final by-election results:

2016 Mount Roskill by-election
Notes: Blue background denotes the winner of the by-election. Pink background denotes a candidate elected from their party list prior to the by-election. Yellow background denotes the winner of the by-election, who was a list MP prior to the by-election. A ✓ or ✗ denotes status of any incumbent, win or lose respectively.
Party	Candidate	Votes	%	±%
Labour	Michael Wood	11,623	66.51	+10.69
National	Parmjeet Parmar	4,771	27.30	-4.28
People's Party	Roshan Nauhria	739	4.23	+4.23
Democrats	Andrew Leitch	126	0.72	+0.72
Legalise Cannabis	Brandon Stronge	84	0.48	+0.48
Not A Party	Richard Goode	43	0.25	+0.25
Independent	Tua Schuster	40	0.23	+0.23
Informal votes		50		
Majority		6,852	39.20	+14.97
Turnout		17,476		

=== 2014 election ===
2014 general election: Mount Roskill
Notes:	Blue background denotes the winner of the electorate vote. Pink background denotes a candidate elected from their party list. Yellow background denotes an electorate win by a list member, or other incumbent. A ✓ or ✗ denotes status of any incumbent, win or lose respectively.						
Party	Candidate	Votes	%	±%	Party votes	%	±%
Labour	✓ Phil Goff	18,637	55.81	−1.34	12,086	35.45	−8.16
National	Parmjeet Parmar	10,546	31.58	−2.36	14,275	41.87	+2.33
Green	Barry Coates	1,682	5.04	+1.03	3,279	9.62	+2.35
Conservative	Paul Davie	1,094	3.28	+1.52	1,240	3.64	+1.22
NZ First	Mahesh Bindra	717	2.15	+0.66	1,805	5.29	+0.61
Mana	John Minto	300	0.90	+0.90			
ACT					610	1.79	+0.71
Internet Mana					304	0.89	+0.69 (Note: 2014 Internet Mana swing is relative to the votes for Mana in 2011; it shared a party list with Internet in the 2014 election.)
Māori Party					132	0.39	+0.01
Legalise Cannabis					74	0.22	−0.11
United Future					69	0.20	−0.19
Ban 1080					17	0.05	+0.05
Democrats					10	0.03	±0.00
Civilian					8	0.02	+0.02
Focus					6	0.02	+0.02
Independent Coalition					6	0.02	+0.02
Informal votes		416			176		
Total valid votes		33,392			34,097		
Turnout		34,097	73.69	+3.91			
Labour hold	Majority	8,091	24.23	+1.02			

=== 2011 election ===
2011 general election: Mount Roskill
Notes:	Blue background denotes the winner of the electorate vote. Pink background denotes a candidate elected from their party list. Yellow background denotes an electorate win by a list member, or other incumbent. A ✓ or ✗ denotes status of any incumbent, win or lose respectively.						
Party	Candidate	Votes	%	±%	Party votes	%	±%
Labour	✓ Phil Goff	17,906	57.15	+1.35	14,098	43.61	+0.97
National	Jackie Blue	10,635	33.94	−2.62	12,781	39.54	−2.56
Green	Julie Anne Genter	1,258	4.01	+0.76	2,351	7.27	+2.99
Conservative	Feleti Key	550	1.76	+1.76	783	2.42	+2.42
NZ First	Mahesh Bindra	468	1.49	+1.49	1,513	4.68	+1.88
ACT	Pratima Nand	240	0.77	−1.39	350	1.08	−2.34
Legalise Cannabis	Jasmin Hewlett	167	0.53	+0.53	108	0.33	+0.07
United Future	Bryan Mockridge	77	0.25	−0.39	125	0.39	−0.48
Communist League	Patrick Brown	32	0.10	+0.10			
Māori Party					124	0.38	−0.09
Mana					65	0.20	+0.20
Democrats					11	0.03	+0.01
Libertarianz					11	0.03	+0.01
Alliance					10	0.03	−0.04
Informal votes		766			389		
Total valid votes		31,333			32,330		
Labour hold	Majority	7,271	23.21	+3.97			

Electorate (as at 26 November 2011): 46,332

=== 2008 election ===
2008 general election: Mount Roskill
Notes:	Blue background denotes the winner of the electorate vote. Pink background denotes a candidate elected from their party list. Yellow background denotes an electorate win by a list member, or other incumbent. A ✓ or ✗ denotes status of any incumbent, win or lose respectively.						
Party	Candidate	Votes	%	±%	Party votes	%	±%
Labour	✓ Phil Goff	18,615	55.80	−4.14	14,533	42.64	−7.06
National	Jackie Blue	12,197	36.56	+7.07	14,346	42.09	+7.32
Green	Lisa Er	1,086	3.26	+3.26	1,459	4.28	+0.11
ACT	Shawn Tan	718	2.15	−3.64	1,165	3.42	+0.94
Kiwi	Joseph Rebello	310	0.93	+0.93	198	0.58	+0.58
United Future	Neville Wilson	211	0.63	−2.02	296	0.87	−1.62
Progressive	Suki Amirapu	155	0.46	−0.33	281	0.82	−0.36
RAM	Daphne Lawless	67	0.20	+0.20	16	0.05	+0.05
NZ First					955	2.80	−1.37
Pacific					302	0.89	+0.89
Māori Party					163	0.48	+0.12
Family Party					119	0.35	+0.35
Bill and Ben					104	0.31	+0.31
Legalise Cannabis					90	0.26	+0.15
Alliance					23	0.07	0.00
Workers Party					12	0.04	+0.04
Libertarianz					8	0.02	−0.03
RONZ					8	0.02	0.00
Democrats					7	0.02	0.00
Informal votes		362			188		
Total valid votes		33,359			34,085		
Labour hold	Majority	6,418					

=== 2005 election ===
2005 general election: Mount Roskill
Notes:	Blue background denotes the winner of the electorate vote. Pink background denotes a candidate elected from their party list. Yellow background denotes an electorate win by a list member, or other incumbent. A ✓ or ✗ denotes status of any incumbent, win or lose respectively.						
Party	Candidate	Votes	%	±%	Party votes	%	±%
Labour	✓ Phil Goff	19,476	59.94		16,501	49.70	
National	Jackie Blue	9,581	29.49		11,543	34.77	
ACT	Kenneth Wang	1,882	5.79		825	2.48	
United Future	Richard Barter	860	2.65		826	2.49	
Destiny	Brian Ane	338	1.04		191	0.58	
Progressive	Suki Amirapu	257	0.79		391	1.18	
Direct Democracy	Barry Scott	98	0.30		18	0.05	
Green					1,383	4.17	
NZ First					1,173	3.53	
Māori Party					121	0.36	
Family Rights					64	0.19	
Christian Heritage					60	0.18	
Legalise Cannabis					36	0.11	
Alliance					22	0.07	
Libertarianz					18	0.05	
99 MP					9	0.03	
RONZ					7	0.02	
One NZ					5	0.02	
Informal votes		439			193		
Total valid votes		32,492			33,200		
Labour hold	Majority	9,895					

=== 2002 election ===
2002 general election: Mount Roskill
Notes:	Blue background denotes the winner of the electorate vote. Pink background denotes a candidate elected from their party list. Yellow background denotes an electorate win by a list member, or other incumbent. A ✓ or ✗ denotes status of any incumbent, win or lose respectively.						
Party	Candidate	Votes	%	±%	Party votes	%	±%
Labour	✓ Phil Goff	18,702	64.40	+6.13	14,866	49.73	+3.98
National	Brent Trewheela	4,987	17.17		5,126	17.15	−10.50
ACT	Kenneth Wang	1,494	5.14		2,351	7.86	+1.17
NZ First	Dawn Mullins	1,301	4.48		2,329	7.79	+4.49
United Future	Bernie Ogilvy	1,253	4.31		2,162	7.23	
Christian Heritage	Ewen McQueen	582	2.00		425	1.42	−2.19
Alliance	Brendon Lane	337	1.16		357	1.19	−5.11
Progressive	Trevor Barnard	229	0.79		446	1.49	
Independent	Stephen Berry	157	0.54				
Green					1,577	5.28	+1.53
ORNZ					121	0.40	
Legalise Cannabis					109	0.36	−0.12
One NZ					12	0.04	+0.01
Mana Māori					10	0.03	−0.04
NMP					4	0.01	−0.01
Informal votes		354			124		
Total valid votes		29,042			29,895		
Labour hold	Majority	13,715	47.23	+16.61			

=== 1999 election ===
1999 general election: Mount Roskill
Notes:	Blue background denotes the winner of the electorate vote. Pink background denotes a candidate elected from their party list. Yellow background denotes an electorate win by a list member, or other incumbent. A ✓ or ✗ denotes status of any incumbent, win or lose respectively.						
Party	Candidate	Votes	%	±%	Party votes	%	±%
Labour	Phil Goff	18,475	58.27		14,702	45.75	
National	Phil Raffills	8,768	27.65		8,884	27.65	
Alliance	Sarah Martin	1,190	3.75		2,024	6.30	
ACT	Max Whitehead	894	2.82		2,150	6.69	
Green	Chris Hay	890	2.81		1,205	3.75	
Christian Heritage	Barrie Paterson	677	2.14		1,159	3.61	
NZ First	Chris Comeskey	585	1.85		1,059	3.30	
United NZ	Yousuf Qureshi	155	0.49		209	0.65	
Natural Law	Linda Ellen Davy	71	0.22		57	0.18	
Christian Democrats					308	0.96	
Legalise Cannabis					155	0.48	
Libertarianz					73	0.23	
Animals First					47	0.15	
McGillicuddy Serious					31	0.10	
Mana Māori					24	0.07	
The People's Choice					11	0.03	
One NZ					10	0.03	
Mauri Pacific					8	0.02	
South Island					8	0.02	
NMP					5	0.02	
Republican					3	0.01	
Freedom Movement					1	0.00	
Informal votes		790			362		
Total valid votes		31,705			32,133		
Labour win new seat	Majority	9,707	30.62				
