= Carlos Cheung =

New Zealand National Party politician

Carlos Cheung MP
- 張雋浩
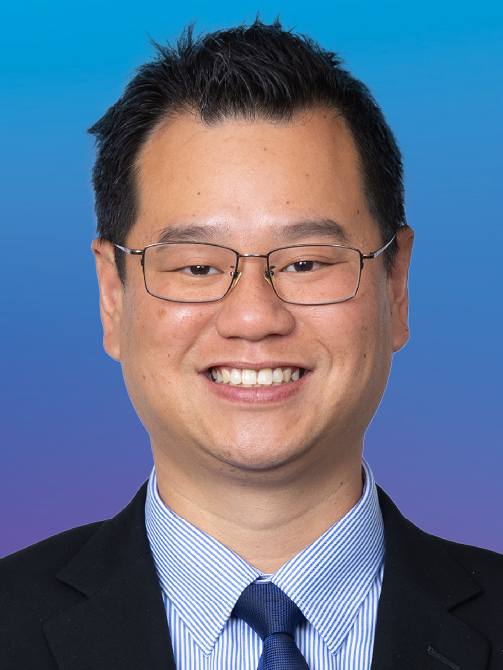
- Cheung in 2023

Member of the New Zealand Parliament for Mount Roskill
- In office 14 October 2023 – 7 November 2026
- Preceded by: Michael Wood
- Succeeded by: Michael Wood

Personal details
- Born: Hong Kong
- Party: National
- Profession: Medical researcher, property management
- Scientific career
- Education: University of Auckland
- Thesis: Acquired copper imbalance in diabetes-induced cardiac disease: Molecular mechanisms and reversibility (2013)
- Doctoral advisors: Garth Cooper; Shaoping Zhang

Chun Ho Carlos Cheung (Chinese: 張雋浩; Cantonese Yale: Jēung Jeun-houh) is a New Zealand politician. He was elected as a Member of the New Zealand House of Representatives for Mount Roskill, representing the National Party, in the 2023 New Zealand general election. Cheung has worked as a medical researcher and owned two property management companies. During the 2026 New Zealand general election, Cheung was unseated after no National list MPs were elected into Parliament via the party vote.

== Career ==
Cheung was born in Hong Kong and moved to New Zealand as a teenager. He attended Auckland Grammar School and the University of Auckland, where he studied science and eventually graduated with a PhD in biological science. His 2013 thesis was on diabetes-induced cardiac disease, and his doctoral advisors were Garth Cooper and Shaoping Zhang. He worked as a medical researcher but decided to leave research due to difficulty finding funding. He set up Lifestyle Property Management in 2014 and later started a second company, Enfield Property Management.

== Political career ==
New Zealand Parliament
Years	Term	Electorate	List	Party
2023–2026	54th	Mount Roskill	48	National

Cheung was announced as National's candidate for Mount Roskill in March 2023 and was also a National Party list candidate, ranked 48th. On election night, Cheung won the electorate with an 1,564-vote lead over incumbent Michael Wood. Mount Roskill had been regarded as a safe seat for Labour, with Wood holding a majority of 14,000 votes in the 2020 election, leading to Cheung's win being called "one of the stand out upsets of the election". Cheung is the second Chinese-born MP to hold an electorate seat in New Zealand, the first being Pansy Wong.

During the 2026 New Zealand general election, Cheung contested the Mount Roskill for National. He was ranked 33rd on the National Party list. On 7 November, Cheung was defeated by Labour candidate Michael Wood by a margin of 262 votes based on preliminary results. Since no National list MPs were elected to Parliament via the party list, Cheung was unseated.

== Views and positions ==
Cheung stated that he plans to "reduce cost-of-living pressures and restore law and order in our community". He also planned to reduce costs for landlords.

== Personal life ==
He is married to Fiona Lai, who was elected as a Communities and Residents candidate to the Puketāpapa Local Board in 2019 and 2022. They live in Mount Roskill.

New Zealand Parliament
Preceded by Michael Wood	Member of Parliament for Mount Roskill; 2023–2026	Succeeded by Michael Wood
