= 2016 Mount Roskill by-election =

New Zealand by-election

- 3 December 2016

The Mount Roskill electorate seat in the House of Representatives
- Turnout: 17,476
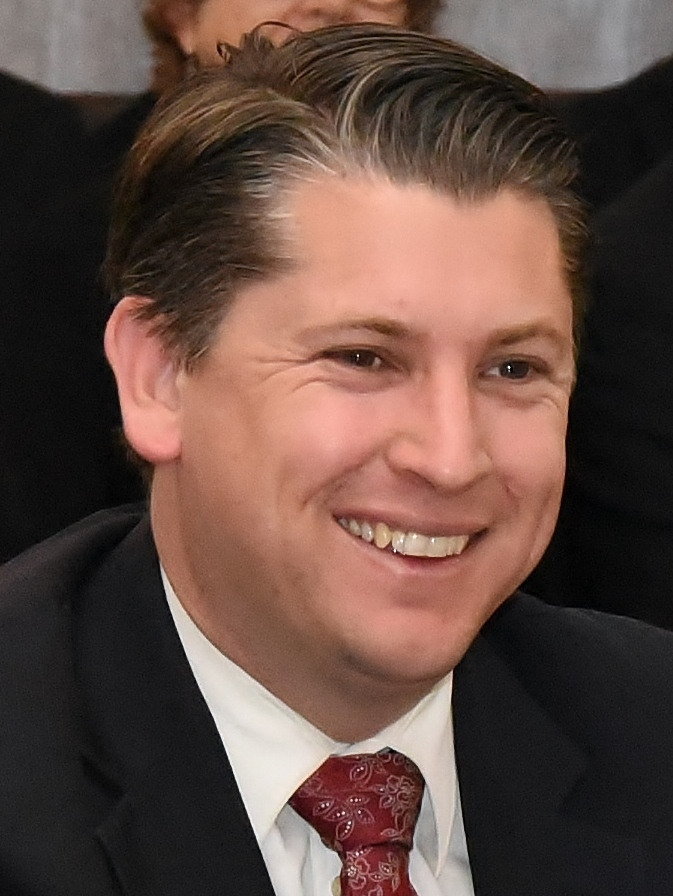

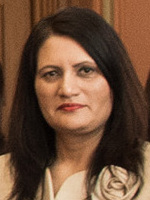
| | First party | Second party |
|---|---|---|
| Candidate | Michael Wood | Parmjeet Parmar |
| Party | Labour | National |
| Popular vote | 11,623 | 4,771 |
| Percentage | 66.51% | 27.30% |
| Swing | ▲10.69pp | ▼4.28pp |
- Wood: 50–60% 60–70% 70–80% 80–90% Parmar: 40–50% No polling places
MP before election
Phil Goff
Labour
Elected MP
Michael Wood
Labour

A by-election was held in the Mount Roskill electorate on 3 December 2016. The seat was vacated following the resignation of Phil Goff after he was elected Mayor of Auckland.

== Background ==
At just under 23 km^{2} (9 sq mi) Mount Roskill has the third-smallest land area among New Zealand's electorates. Following the 2014 boundary changes, it lost New Windsor to the New Lynn electorate, but gained areas around Three Kings and Sandringham and retained the communities of Mount Roskill, Lynfield, Wesley, and Hillsborough. About 39% of the usually resident population of Mount Roskill are from the Asian ethnic group – the second-highest percentage of any general electorate in 2013, and over three times the national average (11.8%). Just less than half of the people in the electorate in 2013 were born in New Zealand (49.1%) – the fifth-lowest share in New Zealand. The proportions of those affiliated with Islam (5.9%), and those affiliated with Hinduism (10.5%), are the highest and third-highest in the country respectively. Over two-thirds (67.9%) of people in Mount Roskill stated they had never smoked, the third-highest share among general electorates.

At the 2014 election, Phil Goff (Labour) captured a majority (56.5%) of the 32,976 valid electorate votes cast for candidates in the Mount Roskill electorate. The National Party captured a plurality (42.1%, cf. 47.1% nationally) of the party votes in Mount Roskill, up 2.6 percentage points on its party vote share in 2011. The Labour Party received 35.6% of the party votes, the Green Party received 9.7%, and New Zealand First received 5.3%. No other party gained more than 5% of the party votes. Turnout (total votes cast as a proportion of enrolled electors) in 2014 was 75.0%.

== Candidates ==
| Party | Name | Notes |
|---|---|---|
| Labour Party | Michael Wood | Michael Wood, a member of the Puketapapa Local Board, was announced as the Labour Party's candidate. |
| National Party | Parmjeet Parmar | The National Party announced list MP and previous Mount Roskill candidate Parmjeet Parmar to contest the by-election. Parmar unsuccessfully ran against Goff in the 2014 New Zealand general election but was elected to Parliament on the party list. |
| People's Party | Roshan Nauhria | The newly created People's Party announced they would field a candidate; Rohan Nauhria, the party's leader and co-founder. |
| Democrats for Social Credit | Andrew Leitch | Andrew Leitch was announced as the Democrats for Social Credit candidate. He ran in the seat of New Lynn in the 2014 election, placing fifth with 0.39% of the vote. |
| Aotearoa Legalise Cannabis Party | Brandon Stronge | The Aotearoa Legalise Cannabis Party stood Brandon Stronge as their candidate. |
| Not A Party | Richard Goode | Richard Goode, of Not A Party (NAP), ran on a "post-democratic" ticket asking people not to vote for him. He had previously stood for the Aotearoa Legalise Cannabis Party, and was its vice president. |
| Independent | Tua Schuster | |

The Green Party stated it would not field a candidate in the by-election. Co-leader Metiria Turei said the vote would be closely contested and that the Greens did not want to "play any role in National winning the seat". ACT New Zealand also decided not to stand in the by-election, with leader David Seymour saying they wanted to give National the best possible chance of winning the seat. New Zealand First leader Winston Peters said his party would also not stand a candidate in Mount Roskill. He said that while prospective candidates had come forward, the party intended to focus its resources on the general election in 2017. Perennial candidate Adam Holland, a grandson of former Prime Minister Sidney Holland, announced his intention to run for the seat. He earlier contested the Auckland Mayoralty, which was won by Goff, receiving 1,772 votes (0.45 percent). Ultimately, Holland withdrew and did not stand.

== Results ==
The by-election was won decisively by Labour's Michael Wood.

The following table shows final by-election results:

2016 Mount Roskill by-election
Notes: Blue background denotes the winner of the by-election. Pink background denotes a candidate elected from their party list prior to the by-election. Yellow background denotes the winner of the by-election, who was a list MP prior to the by-election. A ✓ or ✗ denotes status of any incumbent, win or lose respectively.
| Party | Candidate | Votes | % | ±% |
|---|---|---|---|---|
| Labour | Michael Wood | 11,623 | 66.51 | +10.69 |
| National | Parmjeet Parmar | 4,771 | 27.30 | -4.28 |
| People's Party | Roshan Nauhria | 739 | 4.23 | +4.23 |
| Democrats | Andrew Leitch | 126 | 0.72 | +0.72 |
| Legalise Cannabis | Brandon Stronge | 84 | 0.48 | +0.48 |
| Not A Party | Richard Goode | 43 | 0.25 | +0.25 |
| Independent | Tua Schuster | 40 | 0.23 | +0.23 |
| Informal votes | | 50 | | |
| Majority | | 6,852 | 39.20 | +14.97 |
| Turnout | | 17,476 | | |

== See also ==
- 2016 Auckland mayoral election
- 2017 Mount Albert by-election, on 25 February 2017
