= Mahesh Bindra =

New Zealand politician

Member of the New Zealand Parliament for New Zealand First list
- In office 20 September 2014 – 23 September 2017

Personal details
- Born: Mumbai, India
- Education: University of Mumbai

Mahesh Jaichand Bindra is an Indian-born New Zealand politician who represented New Zealand First as a list MP in Parliament between 2014 and 2017. He was the party's ethnic affairs spokesperson.

== Background ==
Bindra was born in Mumbai and obtained BA (Honours) degree in Political Science and Psychology from the University of Mumbai. He trained as an officer cadet for the Indian Army with the National Cadet Corps (India). He worked as a security officer for Air India at Mumbai airport until 1986, he then joined Air India cabin crew as an assistant flight purser until 2002. He migrated to New Zealand from India in 2002 with his wife, twin daughters, and son. In about 2006 his wife was killed in a car crash.

Bindra was listed on the 2014 electoral roll for the Mount Roskill electorate as being a case manager and worked for the Department of Corrections. Bindra's election profile stated that he had extensive experience in rehabilitation and reintegration of offenders into the society.

He was chairman of the Corrections Association of New Zealand for South Auckland Prison, and a member of the International Corrections and Prisons Association, the executive committee of the Bhartiya Samaj Charitable Trust, the Hindi Language and Culture Trust of New Zealand, and the Global Organization for People of Indian Origin.

== Political career ==
New Zealand Parliament
Years	Term	Electorate	List	Party
2014–2017	51st	List	11	NZ First

Bindra's father was active in the Bharatiya Jana Sangh. Bindra became a member of New Zealand First in 2006. At the 2011 election, Bindra contested Mount Roskill for New Zealand First, placing 5th with 419 votes. He was ranked 21st on the party list and not elected to parliament.

He again contested Mount Roskill in 2014 election gaining 607 votes, but was elected to parliament as a list MP after being ranked 11th on the New Zealand First list. After the election he received criticism in The New Zealand Herald and blogs for not disclosing details of his employment. In a press release, once he had been confirmed as a Member of Parliament, he revealed that he was a Department of Corrections senior corrections officer. He said that his contractual agreement with his employer prevented him from divulging this before he was appointed.

In his maiden speech on 6 November 2014 Bindra pledged to confront "the monsters who would stand against a fair and just society ..." and "... defend the rights of all those who feel aggrieved and are". Bindra was appointed New Zealand First's customs, ethnic affairs, and corrections spokesperson. He has been appointed to Parliaments Law and Order Select Committee.

With Winston Peters' win in the 2015 Northland by-election his executive assistant, Ria Bond became the New Zealand Party's 12th member of Parliament.

He moved up one place to 10th on the party list for the 2017 New Zealand general election. New Zealand First only gained 9 seats in the election, ending Bindra's time in Parliament.

Since the 2017 election Bindra has remained active in New Zealand First. He stood again for the party in the 2020 election, as its candidate for the seat of Hutt South. Bindra came sixth place, gaining only 316 votes. New Zealand First's popular vote also dropped to 2.6%, below the five percent threshold needed to enter Parliament.

In September 2023, Bindra stood down as NZ First's candidate in the Panmure-Ōtāhuhu electorate for the 2023 New Zealand general election, citing personal reasons.
