= Hamish Cooper =

New Zealand diplomat and public servant

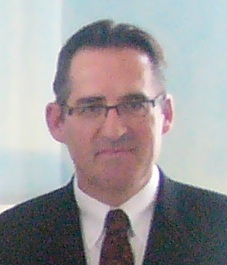
- Cooper in 2009

New Zealand High Commissioner to the United Kingdom
- Incumbent
- Assumed office 5 September 2025
- Monarch: Charles III
- Prime Minister: Christopher Luxon
- Preceded by: Chris Seed

Personal details
- Education: University of Canterbury
- Profession: Diplomat

Hamish Cooper is a New Zealand diplomat who currently holds the office of High Commissioner of New Zealand to the United Kingdom.

== Biography ==
=== Early life and education ===
Cooper is a graduate of the University of Canterbury, where he studied English literature and American Studies. Subsequently, at the University of Pennsylvania he obtained his postgraduate degree and received a Fulbright-scholarship and the Canterbury Fellowship, which the University of Pennsylvania made for University of Canterbury graduates. In 1984 Cooper returned to New Zealand.

=== Diplomatic career ===
Shortly after his return to New Zealand, he received two job offers, one from Ministry of Foreign Affairs and Trade and the other from the University of Canterbury. He chose the former and in 1985 began in the Ministry of Foreign Affairs and Trade, in the hope to be able to work one day at the New Zealand embassy in Washington, D.C.. However, the ministry posted him to Japan and sent him for two years to Yokohama to be able to learn Japanese. After employment in the New Zealand High Commission in London he was New Zealand's Consulate-General in Osaka.

Furthermore, Cooper held senior positions in the Ministry of Foreign Affairs, including as Principal Advisor for Multilateral and Legal Affairs and Director of International Security and Disarmament.

In 2013 Cooper began as ambassador to Armenia accredited for New Zealand, and was subsequently ambassador to Russia and Turkey. In 2019, he was sent to Japan as ambassador.

In 2025 Foreign Minister Winston Peters announced that he had made the decision to remove Phil Goff from the post of High Commissioner in London. Cooper was announced as Goff's replacement.

== Personal life ==
Cooper is married to Los Angeles born and Hiroshima raised Misako Kitaoka, who works as public relations and marketing director. They have one son.
