= Minister for Workplace Relations and Safety =

New Zealand minister of the Crown

Workplace Relations and Safety of New Zealand
- Coat of arms of New Zealand

- Flag of New Zealand

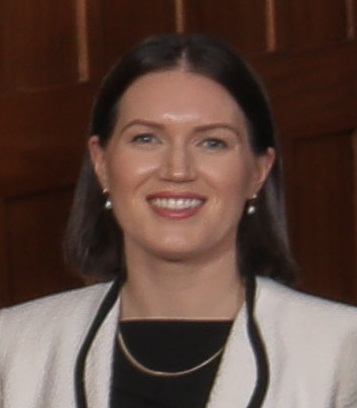
- Incumbent; Brooke van Velden since 27 November 2023
- WorkSafe New Zealand
- Style: The Honourable
- Member of: Cabinet of New Zealand; Executive Council
- Reports to: Prime Minister of New Zealand
- Appointer: Governor-General of New Zealand
- Term length: At His Majesty's pleasure
- Formation: 8 October 2014
- First holder: Michael Woodhouse
- Salary: $288,900
- Website: www.beehive.govt.nz

The Minister for Workplace Relations and Safety is a minister in the New Zealand Government. The minister has responsibility for WorkSafe New Zealand and acts as chair of the Industrial Relations Foundation. It was preceded by the Minister of Labour.

The current minister is Brooke van Velden.

== Overview ==
The minister oversees the health and safety at work regulatory system, employment relations and standards regulatory system including the overarching employment relations framework and prescribed minimum standards, such as the minimum wage and holiday entitlements.

== List of ministers ==
Key

Labour National ACT

No.	Name	Portrait	Term of Office		Prime Minister
1	Michael Woodhouse		8 October 2014	26 October 2017	Key
1	Michael Woodhouse		8 October 2014	26 October 2017	English
2	Iain Lees-Galloway		26 October 2017	22 July 2020	Ardern
3	Andrew Little		22 July 2020	6 November 2020	Ardern
4	Michael Wood		6 November 2020	21 June 2023	Ardern
4	Michael Wood		6 November 2020	21 June 2023	Hipkins
5	Carmel Sepuloni		21 June 2023	27 November 2023	Hipkins
6	Brooke van Velden		27 November 2023	present	Luxon
