= Stewart Murray Wilson =

New Zealand criminal

- Born: 11 December 1946; Timaru, New Zealand
- Died: 11 October 2021 (aged 74); Whanganui, New Zealand
- Known for: Sexual offending

Stewart Murray Wilson (11 December 1946 – 11 October 2021) was a New Zealand sex offender. He was born and raised in Timaru, New Zealand. During his 20s, he lived in Sydney before moving to Blenheim, New Zealand. He was known for serious sexual offences, including criminal acts against children. He served 18 years in prison. In September 2012, he was released on parole with the most stringent release conditions ever imposed on a person in New Zealand. These included that he would be required to live in a house on the grounds of Whanganui prison – which led to public outrage from local citizens and the Whanganui District Council. Wilson was recalled to jail in February 2013 after he allegedly made a phone call to someone he was not allowed to contact.

== Biography ==
His parents divorced during the 1970s. A family friend reported that Wilson's father used to beat his wife and children. Wilson was directed to live in a children's home.

Wilson also spent time at Cherry Farm Psychiatric Hospital during his youth. In a letter to the judge prior to sentencing in 2018, Wilson wrote that he had no memory of the events with which he was charged nearly 50 years before, which he put down to

the shock treatment I received while a patient at Cherry Farm Hospital, Sunnyside Hospital, Porirua Hospital, Tokanui Hospital, Carrington and Oakley hospital while I was under child welfare for seven years until I was 21 years old ... While in those hospitals and welfare homes, I was abused, raped and bullied many many times. I witnessed the murder of a male nurse who I tried to protect and who died in my arms and that person also tried to kill me as I was a witness.

Wilson mentioned that he had been receiving counselling from ACC because of his childhood abuse but his probation officer cancelled it.

Wilson's criminal record began in 1962 when he appeared in court on burglary charges. Prior to the 1990s, he also had convictions for assaults on females, living off the earnings of a prostitute, and assault on a child. In 1996 Wilson was convicted on sex offences involving 16 female victims from 1972 to December 1994, when he was arrested. The guilty verdicts were for seven charges of rape, one of attempted rape, six of indecent assault, two of stupefying, one of attempted stupefying, two of wilful ill-treatment of a child, three of assault on a female, and one of bestiality. Some of the charges were laid representatively. One of the indecent assaults was of a girl under the age of 16. He was acquitted of two other charges. Wilson was sentenced in March 1996 to 21 years in prison. During sentencing the judge said that he would have given a sentence of preventive detention, except that this option was not available for him to use.

== Lack of rehabilitation in prison ==
For many years Wilson was held in Rolleston Prison, a low-security prison. This prison has a sex offenders unit called Kia Marama, providing a group-based treatment programme for convicted child sex offenders. However, the Department refused to put Wilson into the programme because he would not admit to a psychologist that he was guilty of the child sex offences for which he was convicted, one of the criteria for inclusion: "To be admitted to the Kia Marama Unit, prisoners must admit to their offending". However, one other entry criterion for the programme states that, "denial or other cognitive distortions related to offending behaviour" is an indication of suitability for the programme".

Wilson said that not only had he been denied any treatment since being sentenced in 1996, he had also been denied one-on-one counselling with a psychologist – again because he would not admit he was guilty. Prior to his release in 2012, he told the High Court he had received only four hours of one-on-one counselling in the 18 years he had been in prison. Wilson said he had also offered to attend a 'Sexual Treatment Outpatients Programme' (STOP) to treat sex offenders, but was not permitted to do so.

Wilson made repeated appearances before the New Zealand Parole Board from September 2006. However, he was not released until his statutory release date in 2012 because he continued to deny responsibility for his offending, appeared to have no remorse, and had not engaged in any treatment. The Corrections Department also claimed he was at high risk of re-offending although his score on the Department's main risk assessment tool (the RoC*RoI) placed him at medium risk.

== Parole Board hearings ==
Prior to his impending release in September 2012, Wilson appeared before the Parole Board at least five times. Each application for early release was turned down. At the age of 65, after 18 years in prison, he was released two days before his statutory release date of 1 September 2012.

In the process of establishing his release conditions, the parole board was told by clinical psychologist Jane Freeman-Brown that Wilson was still at high risk of re-offending. Wilson declined to be interviewed for the assessment, which relied instead on information from his prison file. Nevertheless, the Parole Board accepted her assessment of him as high risk and imposed 17 release conditions, said to be the toughest conditions ever imposed on anyone released from prison in New Zealand. The first of those conditions required Wilson to live in a state house which was to be shifted onto the grounds of Whanganui Prison especially for him. Another condition was for him to wear a GPS tracking device – one of the first prisoners ever to be fitted with one. Wilson was not allowed to use the internet.

Three months after his release, Wilson continued to live rent free in a house on prison land. The Parole Board turned down a request from the Corrections Department that would have forced him to pay about $100 a week to live there. His lawyer Andrew McKenzie said Corrections was "essentially asking to take $100, but not give him the rights of tenant". Wilson was not even allowed to go into stores in Whanganui to buy clothes. McKenzie says the rules surrounding Wilson's release remained unclear.

=== Public reaction to his release ===
Wilson's release created a public outcry, led by former Whanganui mayor and broadcaster Michael Laws, who was furious that Whanganui was being used as a 'dumping ground' for sex offenders. The Whanganui District Council was so concerned it filed proceedings with the High Court to try to prevent his being sent there. After the High Court ruled against the council, Councillor Ray Stevens started a campaign to have Wilson banned from Whanganui shops.

Media coverage about Wilson's release was extensive, with many journalists remarking that he had been dubbed the "Beast of Blenheim". How Wilson first came to be labelled the "Beast" is not known. Columnist Rosemary McLeod observed that the media generally cannot get away with such insulting terminology – but said nobody seemed to be protesting at Wilson's being "dubbed in this way". Jim Hopkins, a columnist for The New Zealand Herald noted for his humorous writing style, said: "We're never told who did the dubbery, but it is exceedingly kind of the media to advise us that it's happened."

Victoria University professor Tony Ward, a clinical psychologist with expertise in sexual offenders, tried to allay the public's fears. The Howard League for Penal Reform was also concerned about "local bodies feeding moral panic and hysteria" and wrote to the Whanganui District Council stating it may issue a High Court challenge over Council steps to orchestrate the shunning of Murray Wilson.

=== Recall ===
Wilson was recalled on an interim basis in February 2013 after Corrections claimed he had made a phone call to a woman on his blacklisted contacts list. When he appeared before the Board in April 2013, the Board made the recall "indefinite". The Board said he still posed an undue risk to the community after it emerged that he had talked with the woman about leaving the country and said he "remained deceptive in his behaviour and selective in what he chose to disclose to his probation team". This meant that Wilson was likely to remain in prison until the end of his sentence in September 2015, after which release conditions could be imposed for a maximum of six months. The Corrections Department sought an extended supervision order against Wilson for a term of 10 years, starting when his parole or release conditions came to an end.

His brief stay in the community cost the taxpayer over $200,000 – double the amount it costs to keep a prisoner in jail for a year. This included the cost of his relocation from Rolleston Prison to Whanganui, the cost of his housing in the grounds of the Whanganui prison and the Crown's cost of defending legal action brought by Wilson and the Whanganui District Council against his placement at Whanganui.

=== Re-release ===
Wilson was granted parole again in December 2014 and released to live in a house on the grounds of Whanganui Prison where he would be subject to GPS monitoring and supervision if he left the house.

== Later events ==
In May 2017, Wilson met journalist Harrison Christian while fishing at the Whanganui river mouth. He told Christian he was being investigated by police once again for historical rape allegations. He denied all of his offending, and demanded more freedom. In 2018, he was sentenced to two years and four months' imprisonment for those historical rapes. In August 2019, it was announced that he was about to be released again, and as of November 2019 he was residing in a house on the grounds of Whanganui Prison. On 11 October 2021, Wilson died of natural causes in Whanganui hospital, aged 74.

== See also ==
- List of serial rapists
