= Leader of the House (New Zealand) =

New Zealand political title

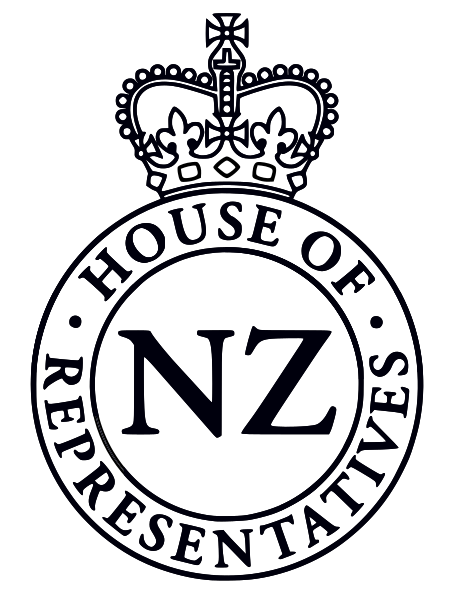

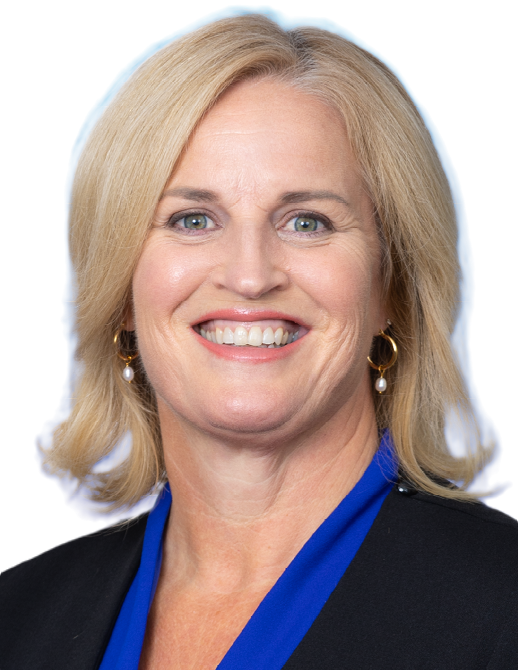
- Incumbent; Louise Upston since 7 April 2026
- Appointer: Governor-General of New Zealand
- Term length: At His Majesty's pleasure
- Inaugural holder: David Thomson
- Formation: 13 December 1978
- Deputy: Scott Simpson

In the New Zealand Parliament, the leader of the House is the government minister appointed by the prime minister to be responsible for the management of Government business in the House of Representatives. This includes determining the order in which the Government's legislative agenda will be addressed in the House. The leader of the House is also an ex officio member of the Parliamentary Service Commission.

== History and functions ==
The first leader of the House was appointed in 1978, although a similar office had existed in Australia since 1951 and another in the United Kingdom for several centuries. The responsibilities of the leader of the House were previously functions exercised by the prime minister.

The leader of the House serves three main functions:

- Moving motions for the Government that relate to House and committee procedure
- Determining the order of Government business in the House
- The primary responsibility for the Government's lawmaking programme

== List of leaders of the House ==
The following individuals have been appointed as leader of the New Zealand House of Representatives:

Key

National Labour

No.	Name	Portrait	Term of Office		Prime Minister
1	David Thomson		13 December 1978	26 July 1984	Muldoon
2	Geoffrey Palmer		26 July 1984	24 August 1987	Lange
3	Jonathan Hunt		24 August 1987	2 November 1990	Lange
3	Jonathan Hunt		24 August 1987	2 November 1990	Palmer
3	Jonathan Hunt		24 August 1987	2 November 1990	Moore
4	Paul East		2 November 1990	27 March 1993	Bolger
5	Don McKinnon		27 March 1993	16 December 1996	Bolger
6	Wyatt Creech		16 December 1996	31 August 1998	Bolger
6	Wyatt Creech		16 December 1996	31 August 1998	Shipley
7	Roger Sowry		31 August 1998	10 December 1999	Shipley
8	Michael Cullen		10 December 1999	19 November 2008	Clark
9	Gerry Brownlee		19 November 2008	2 May 2017	Key
9	Gerry Brownlee		19 November 2008	2 May 2017	English
10	Simon Bridges		2 May 2017	26 October 2017	English
11	Chris Hipkins		26 October 2017	25 January 2023	Ardern
12	Grant Robertson		25 January 2023 (Note: Acting Leader of the House from 25 January until 1 February 2023.)	27 November 2023	Hipkins
13	Chris Bishop		27 November 2023	7 April 2026	Luxon
14	Louise Upston		7 April 2026	Present	Luxon

== See also ==
- Leader of the Legislative Council (equivalent in the New Zealand Legislative Council)
