= Canz =

Canz or CANZ may refer to:

== People ==
- Israel Gottlieb Canz (1690–1753), a German Protestant theologian

== Places ==
- Native name of Canzo, a town in Italy

== Organisations ==
- Composers Association of New Zealand
- Corrections Association of New Zealand
- CANZ (United Nations), a caucus of Canada, Australia and New Zealand at the United Nations
