= List of prisons in New Zealand =

There are 18 adult prisons in New Zealand. Three prisons house women, one each in Auckland, Wellington and Christchurch. The remaining fifteen house men; ten in the North Island and five in the South Island. The facilities are managed by the Department of Corrections. In addition, there are five youth correctional facilities, termed youth justice residences, which are managed by Oranga Tamariki (the Ministry for Children).

There are five security levels in New Zealand adult prisons: Minimum, Low, Low-Medium, High and Maximum.

In 2018 North & South magazine published a long-form article by Paul Little titled "The Case for Closing Prisons" which included data on New Zealand prison inmate populations.

== List of prisons ==
Name	Location	Opened	Gender	Type/Security	Capacity	Ref
Northland Region Corrections Facility	near Kaikohe, Northland; 35.3970°S 173.8581°E	2005	Male	Minimum to High	628	
Auckland Prison	Paremoremo, Auckland; 36.7566°S 174.6476°E	1968	Male	Minimum to Maximum	667	
Mount Eden Corrections Facility	Mount Eden, Auckland; 36.8675°S 174.7657°E	2011	Male	Remand	1046	
Auckland Region Women's Corrections Facility	Wiri, Auckland; 37.0112°S 174.8502°E	2006	Female	Minimum to Maximum	462	
Auckland South Corrections Facility	Wiri, Auckland; 37.0152°S 174.8511°E	2015	Male	Minimum to High	960	
Spring Hill Corrections Facility	Hampton Downs, Waikato; 37.3735°S 175.0813°E	2007	Male	Minimum to High	1002	
Waikeria Prison	south of Te Awamutu, Waikato; 38.0997°S 175.3868°E	1911	Male	Minimum to High	778	
Tongariro/Rangipo Prison	near Tūrangi, Waikato; 38.9925°S 175.8451°E	1922	Male	Minimum to Low-medium	540	
Hawke's Bay Regional Prison	south-west of Hastings; 39.6631°S 176.7828°E	1989	Male	Minimum to High	722	
Whanganui Prison	Kaitoke, south of Whanganui; 39.9829°S 175.0947°E	1978	Male	Minimum to Maximum	581	
Manawatu Prison	Linton, south-west of Palmerston North; 40.4001°S 175.5705°E	1979	Male	Minimum to High	290	
Rimutaka Prison	Trentham, Upper Hutt; 41.1550°S 175.0355°E	1967	Male	Minimum to High	1078	
Arohata Prison	Tawa, Wellington; 41.1871°S 174.8264°E	1944	Female	Minimum to High	159	
Christchurch Men's Prison	near Templeton, Christchurch; 43.5240°S 172.4673°E	1915	Male	Minimum to High	940	
Christchurch Women's Prison	near Templeton, Christchurch; 43.5293°S 172.4474°E	1974	Female	Minimum to High	134	
Rolleston Prison	near Rolleston, Canterbury; 43.5983°S 172.3462°E	1958	Male	Minimum to Low-medium	320	
Otago Corrections Facility	north of Milton, Otago; 46.0860°S 170.0089°E	2007	Male	Minimum to High	485	
Invercargill Prison	Invercargill; 46.4045°S 168.3451°E	1910	Male	Minimum to Low-medium	172	

== Northern Region ==
=== Northland Region Corrections Facility (Ngawha) ===
Northland Region Corrections Facility is located 5 km northeast of the town of Kaikohe and is colloquially known as Ngawha – after the local area. Maori in Northland tried to persuade the Corrections Department not to upset a local taniwha by building the prison on thermal land. They were unsuccessful and the facility opened in 2005. Following completion, the foundations proved to be unstable.

The prison accommodates up to 548 prisoners with security classifications ranging from minimum to high-medium and employs 180 staff.

=== Auckland Prison (Paremoremo) ===
Auckland Prison opened in 1968 and is at Paremoremo, on the northern fringe of Auckland, and thus also known as Paremoremo Prison. It contains New Zealand's only specialist maximum-security prison unit and houses some of the most violent criminals in the country.

It has beds for 680 prisoners, and in 2010, about 90 prisoners were classified as maximum security. It has a 60-bed treatment unit for child-sex offenders called Te Piriti and a Special Needs Unit. In November 2011, a Drug Treatment Unit (DTU) was established with clinical staff coming from Odyssey House. The DTU houses up to 48 prisoners and provides an intensive 12-week programme targeted at prisoners serving sentences of between four and twelve months.

=== Mount Eden Corrections Facility ===
History

There has been a prison on the Mount Eden site in Auckland since 1856. The first building was made of timber and was known as the Stockade. A new stone building opened in 1865 although the stone wall that surrounds the prison was not finished until the mid-1870s – using prison labour.

The old Mount Eden Prison used to hold about 420 prisoners and was squalid, substandard and unsafe. In 2004 the Department acknowledged the prison "falls well-short of the basic requirements for a modern corrections facility"; a New Zealand Herald editorial described it as an "antiquated pile beyond redemption as a suitable place to incarcerate humans". The 120-year-old prison was closed in 2011. Although it no longer houses inmates, the building has a 'category one' classification from Heritage New Zealand due to its historical significance and architectural quality. The building was to be restored and converted for staff and administration use for the new prison completed on the same site.

Current

The $40 million Auckland Central Remand Prison (ACRP), housing about 250 remand inmates, opened in July 2000, next to the old prison. It became the main reception prison for newly remanded male prisoners in the Auckland region. ACRP was the first prison in New Zealand to be administered by a private company. It was run by an Australian company, GEO Group. Five years later (2005), ACRP was returned to state operation by a Labour government.

A major project to redevelop the site and create another facility began in 2008. New accommodation blocks and support facilities were constructed at a cost of $216 million. The prison was renamed the Mt Eden Corrections Facility (MECF) and now holds 966 prisoners. It opened on 30 March 2011.

In May 2010, the National Government decided that the prison would be privatised once again and British conglomerate, Serco, was awarded the contract. Five years later (July 2015) videos appeared online showing gang members fighting inside MECF. Allegations were made that there was an organised 'fight club' and that prisoners were filming the fights on cell phones and posting them on social media. Following an investigation, the Corrections Department stepped in to take over day-to-day management of the prison and then in December, the Government announced that Serco's contract would not be renewed in March 2017.

In 2019 North & South magazine published the story of Pasimaca Osment, who in 1991 became one of the first female prison officers in New Zealand to work in a maximum-security jail. The piece describes her experiences at Mt Eden Corrections Facility, Spring Hill Corrections Facility and Paremoremo.

=== Auckland Region Women's Corrections Facility ===
The Auckland Region Women's Corrections Facility (ARWCF) is in the Wiri suburb of south Auckland. The site is 47 ha in size, of which only 13 ha are currently covered by the prison, leaving considerable room for expansion. With so much space available, in 2011 it became the proposed site for a new $900 million 960-bed men's prison which was to be built by 2015 and operated by British conglomerate Serco. This would make the suburb of Wiri the country's biggest prison precinct.

The original plan was for only 150 beds, but a 20 per cent hike in the number of women being sent to prison led to a significant expansion. Despite the increase, women still make up only 6% of the prison population. ARWCF now houses up to 456 prisoners and as a result of the increase, the cost blew out from an estimated $58 million to $158 million.

ARWCF is the first purpose-built women's prison in New Zealand. Until it was built, female prisoners have mostly had to serve their sentences at women's prisons in Wellington and Christchurch.

The prison also provides the Kowhiritanga ('Making Choices') Programme. This rehabilitation programme is designed to address the particular needs of female prisoners – many of whom have suffered sexual abuse. Auckland University sociologist Tracey McIntosh says virtually all Maori women in prisons have been physically or sexually abused – and were excluded from school by the age of 13. The Making Choices programme uses cognitive-behavioural therapy, dialectical behaviour therapy, group psychotherapy, recreational psychology and a narrative approach to therapy.

In 2010 it was reported that eight prisoners at the facility were training dogs as part of the Puppies in Prison programme. The puppies were being trained by low security prisoners to help people in the community living with disabilities. The puppies help prepare the prisoners for life outside prison as well as learning around 90 tasks to help their future owners. They live with the women in self care units at the prison and even attend rehabilitation and education programmes with them. The puppies spend a year with the prisoners, before returning to the community for advanced training.

=== Auckland South Corrections Facility ===
In 2010 Corrections Minister, Judith Collins said an additional 2270 prison beds would be needed by 2019 to cope with forecast growth in prisoner numbers and to replace ageing existing prisons. In response, the Government announced that the Department of Corrections proposed the establishment of a new men's prison with 1060 beds on undeveloped land adjacent to the Auckland Region Women's Corrections Facility at 20 Hautu Drive, Wiri, Manukau City.

Environment Minister Nick Smith established a board of inquiry to fast-track the building of the new prison allowing it to bypass the usual resource consents process which is subject to appeals in the Environment Court. After a three-week hearing in May 2011, the inquiry gave Corrections the go ahead to build the prison. A few months later, justice sector forecasts showed a drop in the projected prison population – for the first time ever. Prime Minister John Key then commented that the new prison at Wiri may no longer be needed but also said it might still be built so that 'older prisons may be retired'.

The contract to build and manage a new 960-bed prison was eventually awarded to Serco in 2012. It provided stiff financial penalties if its rehabilitation programmes fail to reduce reoffending by 10% more than the Corrections Department programmes. The Auckland South Corrections Facility was opened on 8 May 2015. The contract to operate the prison ends in 2040.

In March 2022, Te Ao Māori News reported that Wiri prisoners were experiencing unliveable conditions including denial of prison visits, unjustified lockdowns, lack of access to medical care, and insufficient safeguards against COVID-19. Te Ao reported that these conditions had led to two suicides within the space of five months. In response, Serco disputed several incidents in Te Ao's report and defended the quality of its care and services provided to prisoners. That same month, Radio New Zealand reported that Serco was using interns to write psychological reports on Wiri prisoners for the Parole Board.

On 21 December 2023, Serco confirmed that a Wiri inmate had attacked two other prisoners, killing one and hospitalising another. Serco reported the incident to the police and promised to assist the Police investigation. Serco and the Coroner for Investigation also announced that they would carry out a review. The prison was also placed on lockdown with communications and visits being restricted. The following day, Police charged a 47-year-old man with murder and wounding. Serco confirmed that they would carry a review and that they were providing staff and prisoners with support.

=== Spring Hill Corrections Facility ===
Spring Hill Corrections Facility is in the countryside between Meremere and Te Kauwhata, in the Waikato. It is located near Hampton Downs Motorsport Park. Springhill was a former prison site and was developed as early as 2004 according to the new privacy act (2004). Records were being forensically filed with new admissions filling out their own healthcare records for the newly established prison facilities under development at the time and officially opening up as part of the regional prisons development program in 2007. It accommodates up to 1,018 male prisoners with low to high-medium security classifications. In the course of construction, the cost of the prison escalated to $380.3 million (at $600,000 a bed), $97.7 million over its original estimate.

The Department made the unusual step of spending $7.5 million buying and shipping earthmoving equipment from overseas to complete the prison. It says it was caught short by the national building boom and was unable to find the equipment in New Zealand. The Department bought eleven 40-tonne all-terrain dump trucks from Scotland, five compactors from America and France and two excavators from South Korea. When Otago's new Milton prison also cost $43.1 million more than the Department had forecast, Corrections Minister Damien O'Connor subsequently asked Treasury and the State Services Commission (SSC) to carry out an independent review of prison cost blowouts.

Springhill has New Zealand's only Pacific Focus Unit, which provides an environment where prisoners of Pacific ethnicity with a high risk of re-offending are encouraged to address their offending behaviours. Spring Hill also has a combined drug treatment and special treatment unit called Puna Tatari. The special treatment unit provides treatment for serious offenders with a high risk of re-offending who have been convicted of at least one violent offence.

Spring Hill was also the scene of the manslaughter of prison officer Jason Palmer. This was the first death of a New Zealand prison officer on active duty.

On 16 August 2025, 11 prisoners rioted in Spring Hill's exercise yard, setting fires. Corrections staff quelled the riot with the support of Police, Hato Hone St John and Fire and Emergency New Zealand.

== Central region ==
=== Waikeria Prison ===
Waikeria Prison is located 16 kilometres south of Te Awamutu, at Waikeria in the Waikato region, on land seized from Waikato under the Public Works Act. It was built in 1911, held 1031 prisoners and employed 480 staff. It used to be New Zealand's largest prison. However, in 2012, Prime Minister John Key announced that some older prisons would close including units at Waikeria.

The prison includes several specialist units. It has one of the five Māori Focus Units in New Zealand prisons. The Māori Focus Units aim to bring about positive changes in offenders' thinking and behaviour through the practice of Māori values and disciplines, and specialist Māori programmes. Waikeria also has a Drug Treatment Unit for prisoners with drug or alcohol problems and a Special Treatment Unit (Karaka Special Treatment Unit) which is a 40-bed treatment unit for men who have repeatedly committed serious crimes and are considered to have a high risk of re-offending.

Because Waikeria Prison is a large site, the level of physical security varies between different units. The minimum security areas of the prison have fewer physical security feature because minimum security prisoners have been assessed as a minimal risk to the public. Higher security units are surrounded by a highly secure perimeter fence equipped with lighting, surveillance and detection equipment.

Between 29 December 2020 and 3 January 2021, twenty-one prisoners, protesting poor living conditions, staged an uprising at Waikeria and lit fires which ultimately destroyed the prison's top facility. The riots came to an end following negotiations involving Māori Party co-leader Rawiri Waititi.

In May 2024, Prime Minister Christopher Luxon and Police and Corrections Minister Mark Mitchell announced that the Government would allocate NZ$1.9 billion from the 2024 New Zealand budget to adding 810 beds to Waikeria Prison. In late May 2024, the activist group People Against Prisons Aotearoa protested against the expansion of Waikeria Prison, with the group's spokesperson Emmy Rākete describing "the construction of an American-style mega-prison" as "an admission of failure from the outset." In response, Corrections Minister Mitchell said they were investing in Waikeria Prison to deliver more prison capacity and mental health support for inmates.

=== Tongariro/Rangipo Prison ===
Tongariro/Rangipo Prison began as a prison camp called Rangipo in Tūrangi in 1922. When it started the few inmates were housed in tents, the cookhouse was the only building with corrugated iron roof and walls. To access the site with materials and officers they had to be transported across Lake Taupō to Wihi, near Tokaanu. Then travel by bullock wagon to Rangipo. The Hautu prison site was established in 1926, and the 2 prison camps became combined to be called Tongariro Prison 1958 / 59, a separate entity in 1977. The prison is on a large site of more than 8,000 hectares off the Desert Road near Tūrangi. Around 4200 hectares of this land is forested and 2400 hectares is farmed. The remaining 1840 hectares are roads, river reserves, wetlands and native forest. The prison holds about 600 prisoners classified as minimum to low-medium security and 251 staff. Given its size, the Department says it is not possible to surround the Tongariro/Rangipo Prison site with razor wire fencing but units within the prison grounds are said to be appropriately fenced. In 1998, 204 cannabis plants, with an estimated street value of almost $1 million, were found growing at the prison – although the Department denies the crop was grown by prisoners. In July 2011, a former Rangipo Prison guard Manu Stanley Jensen, was sentenced to 16 months in jail after accepting a bribe to supply cannabis to a prisoner.

Tongariro/Rangipo has one of the five Māori Focus Units in New Zealand prisons. The Māori Focus Units aim to bring about positive changes in offenders' thinking and behaviour through the practice of Māori values and disciplines, and specialist Māori programmes. The prison also has a strong relationship with local iwi and a special relationship with the surrounding hapū – Ngāti Turamakina, Ngāti Tūrangitukua, Ngāti Rongomai and Ngāti Hine. Representatives of the hapū meet bi-monthly with the Prison Manager. In 2000, a 25-year-old prisoner Aupai Bruce Tohu drowned after the waka he was on capsized in choppy weather while taking part in a Maori cultural training course. Two years earlier, Rangipo prisoner Matthew Neave, aged 30, also drowned after parachuting into Lake Taupō.

In 2001, the health and safety coordinator for the Corrections Association, Brian Davies, issued a report claiming that the use of buckets as toilets was unhygienic and disgusting both for prisoners and guards. The report said this and other issues were among urgent problems that need fixing in rundown prisons – and cited Rangipo prison as one of the worst prisons. When Corrections Minister Anne Tolley announced prison closures in 2012, some units at Rangipo were included in this announcement.

=== Hawke's Bay Regional Prison ===
Hawke's Bay Regional Prison, originally called Mangaroa, is located near Hastings. It opened in October 1989, replacing the old Napier Prison, which closed in 1993. Mangaroa holds about 640 prisoners and has 325 staff. Hawke's Bay Regional Prison has one of the five Māori Focus Units in New Zealand prisons. The Māori Focus Units aim to bring about positive changes in offenders' thinking and behaviour through the practice of Māori values and disciplines, and specialist Māori programmes. It has a Drug Treatment Unit for prisoners with drug or alcohol problems.

The prison also had one of New Zealand's three Youth Units which accommodates prisoners under the age of 18 and prisoners aged 18–19 who are deemed to be vulnerable in the mainstream prison environment. The Department says youth prisoners are offered a range of psychological, educational and vocational training and claims it meets its obligations under the Education Act 1989 – which requires all under-16-year-olds to be in full-time education. However, Judith Baragwanath, a Parole Board member and former teacher says 92% of teenage offenders in the Youth Units have a learning disability and tutors employed by the Department of Corrections to teach in the Youth Units are not subject to any accredited professional teaching standards. She also says the Youth Units have never been subject to scrutiny by the Education Review Office.

The Youth Unit was closed in 2011 after a disturbance by two 17-year-olds in which one of them threw boiling water over an officer, and stabbing the officer. The inmates caused considerable damage and 11 months later, the unit was still not back in use and no decision had been made on when it would reopen.

In late November 2025, the Corrections Minister Mark Mitchell announced that contractor Naylor Love would build two new high security units at Hawke's Bay Regional Prison with 316 beds. The unis are expected to be completed in 2027.

=== Whanganui Prison ===
Whanganui Prison, in Kaitoke, holds about 538 prisoners and employs 252 staff. The oldest part of the prison, the main Kaitoke Prison complex, was built in 1978, and Te Ohorere, a Self Care Unit, and Te Whakataa minimum security units opened in 2005. Self-care units allow prisoners to get accustomed to living in a house or flat environment within the prison fences; they are designed to help reincorporate prisoners back into society upon release.

Whanganui Prison has one of the five Māori Focus Units in New Zealand prisons. The Māori Focus Units aim to bring about positive changes in offenders' thinking and behaviour through the practice of Māori values and disciplines, and specialist Māori programmes.

Whanganui Prison also has a stand-alone 12-cell at-risk facility to deal with suicidal inmates. Only two prisons in New Zealand have units specifically designed for this purpose. The other is at Waikeria and houses up to 30 prisoners in 26 cells.

=== Manawatu Prison ===
Manawatu Prison holds about 290 prisoners and employs 136 staff. It is located at Linton, south of Palmerston North. The prison began as the Manawatu Youth Institution in 1979 for young male prisoners motivated to make use of the institution's educational, social development, trade training and community-based programmes. It became Manawatu Prison in 1985.

Manawatu prison has a voluntary faith based unit known as the Alpha Unit. The Unit is based on the spiritual values of the Christian faiths and it provides a supportive environment committed to the Principles, Values and Attitudes programme. The programme is run by the prison chaplain and prisoners volunteer to reside in it.

== Southern Region ==
=== Rimutaka Prison ===
Rimutaka Prison is located in the suburb of Trentham, Upper Hutt. It is New Zealand's largest prison, holding up to 1078 prisoners and employing about 570 staff. The prison opened in 1967 and was originally named Wi Tako Prison until the name was changed to Rimutaka Prison circa 1990. It is on a large site at the end of Freyberg Road and the number of cells and prison units has grown substantially in recent years to accommodate rising prisoner numbers. In 2010, Rimutaka became the first prison in New Zealand to open a container-cell unit. The cells are constructed from refurbished shipping containers and the unit houses up to 60 prisoners in a mix of single and double-bunked cells.

Rimutaka Prison includes several specialist rehabilitation units. It has one of the five Māori Focus Units in New Zealand prisons, a Drug Treatment Unit for prisoners with drug or alcohol problems. A Faith-Based Unit providing a programme for prisoners centred around the Christian faith was closed in 2012 after evaluation found it had no impact on reducing reoffending.

Rimutaka also has a 30-bed special treatment unit for violent prisoners called Te Whare Manaakitanga. Prisoners in this unit are taught skills to enable them to live without using violence; this includes conflict resolution, the use of timeout, impulse control and how to challenge their own distorted thinking. The prisoners also learn to change their attitudes towards women. Offenders have to be classified as having a high risk of re-offending in order to attend this programme.

Rimutaka prison opened the country's first dementia unit in December 2012. The Corrections Department said a "high dependency unit" will be created for some of the 120 inmates aged over 65 who struggle with daily tasks, such as showering themselves. Wellington lawyer Mary More, who represents a 75-year-old prisoner believes the unit is long overdue and said: "The Department of Corrections needs to recognise that the courts are sending more and more people to prison for longer ... and we are going to have an aging prison population."

=== Arohata Women's Prison ===
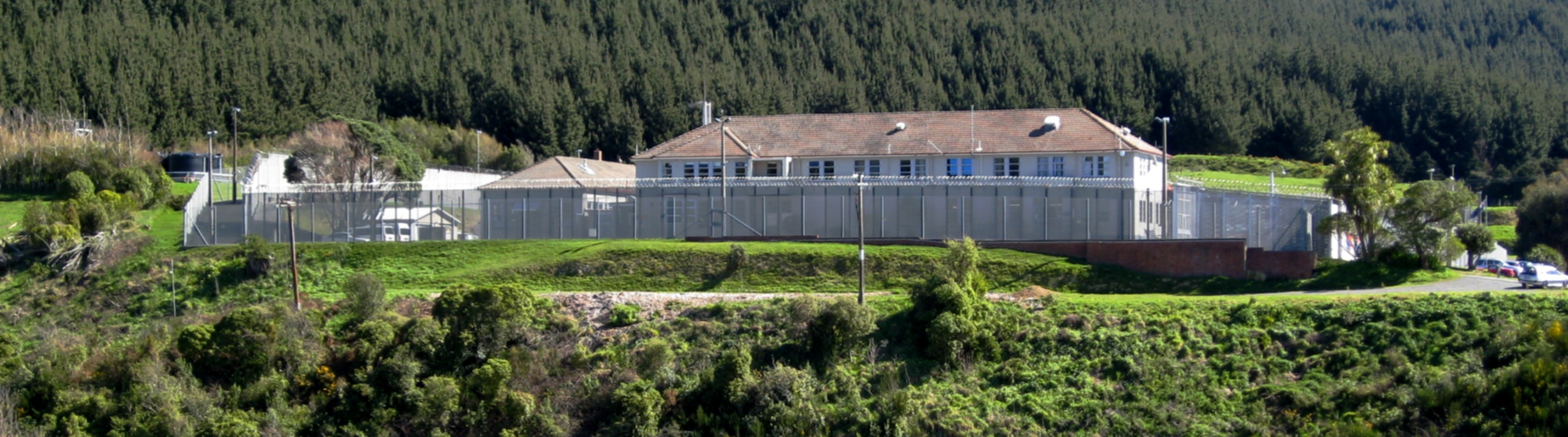
Arohata Women's Prison.

Arohata Prison, one of New Zealand's three women's prisons, is located near Tawa, a suburb in the north of Wellington. The Māori-language name Arohata means "bridge"; it reflects the belief that the prison provides a bridge between past offending and a future in the wider community. The prison, built in 1944, originally operated as a women's borstal. It became a youth prison in 1981 and a women's prison in 1987. It held around150 prisoners and employed 73 staff as of 2013.

The prison includes a Drug Treatment Unit, established in 1999, for prisoners with drug or alcohol problems and is the only women's prison that operates a DTU. Women from Christchurch or Auckland women's prisons who have addictions have to move to Arohata prison to take part in the programme.

Arohata also runs the Kowhiritanga ('Making Choices') Rehabilitation Programme specifically for female prisoners, many of whom have been exposed to sexual and psychological abuse during childhood and in their adult relationships. Most of the programme is based on cognitive-behavioural therapy, dialectical behaviour therapy, group psychotherapy, recreational psychology and a narrative approach to therapy. A Toastmasters group and other volunteers have helped implement a variety of programs such as yoga, quilting, Alcoholics Anonymous meetings, the Catholic-based grief "Seasons for Growth" programme, public-speaking skills, and a kitten-fostering programme.

=== Christchurch Men's Prison ===
Aerial view of Christchurch Men's Prison

Christchurch Men's Prison, also known as Paparua Prison, is located near Paparua to the west of Christchurch. It was built in 1915 and accommodates about 930 prisoners. The prison includes a Drug Treatment Unit for prisoners with drug and alcohol problems as well as a Youth Unit for prisoners under 18 years old.

In September 2010 and 2011, Christchurch was hit by two major earthquakes. The prison suffered no major damage from the first quake but about half of the 800 inmates were moved as a precaution after it affected the prison's plumbing systems. Some were taken by bus to Otago Correctional Facility and others were flown to prisons in the North Island. Those inmates left behind were required to put together ration packs and prepare meals for rescuers.

After the second quake in February 2011, a decision was made to move prisoners from Christchurch's Rolleston Prison to Christchurch Men's Prison, emptying 320 beds to create accommodation for the influx of rescuers into the city.

In October 2023, staffing pressures led Christchurch Men's Prison to relocate 22 inmates to be transferred to the Otago Corrections Facility. While Corrections confirmed that the prison had 944 beds, staffing shortages meant that it only had an "operational capacity" for 786 beds.

=== Christchurch Women's Prison ===
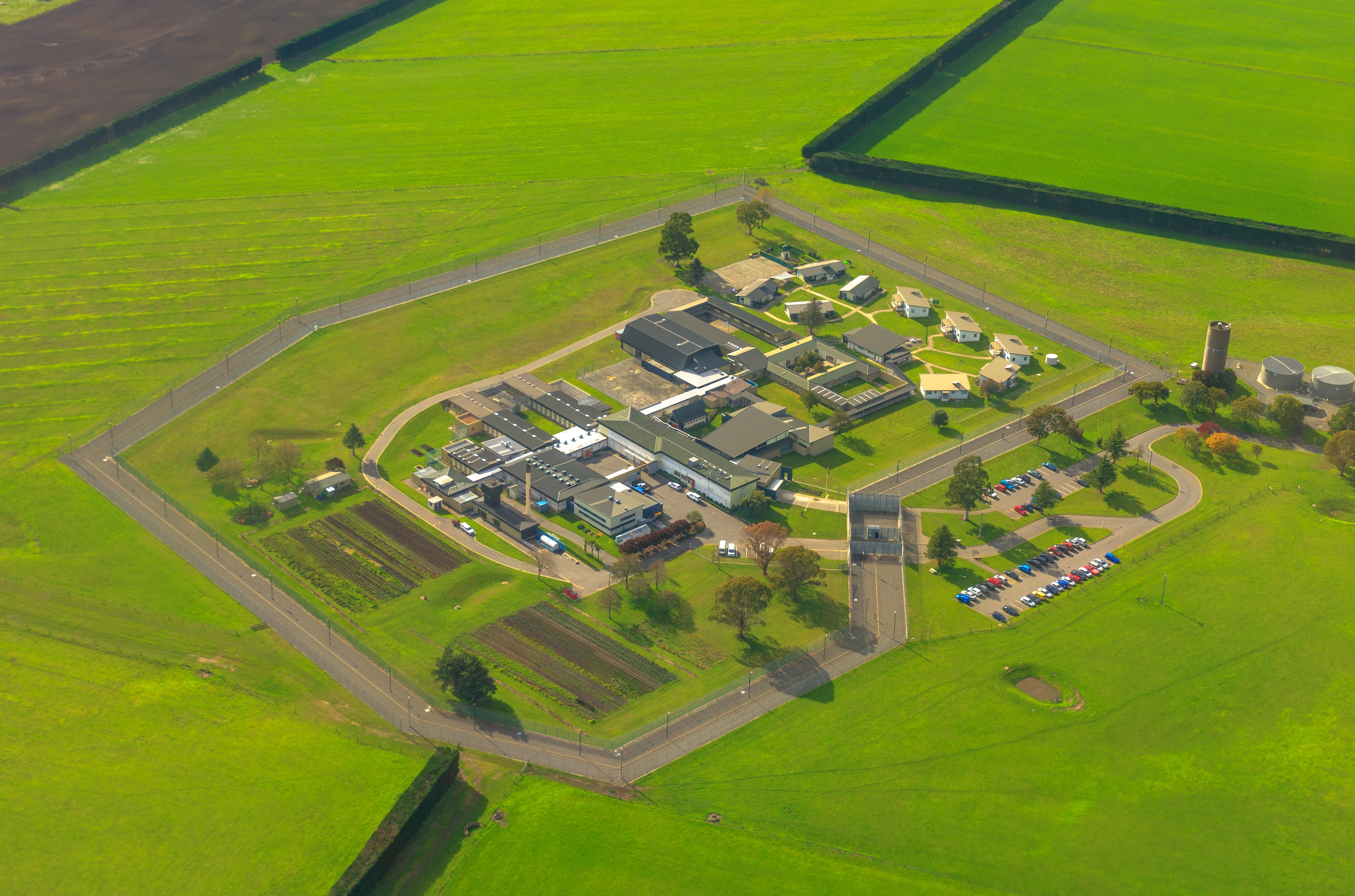
Aerial view of Christchurch Women's Prison

Christchurch Women's Prison is one of three women's prisons in New Zealand and the only one in the South Island. It is near Paparua, to the west of Christchurch. It holds 138 prisoners and employs 70 staff. The prison opened in 1974, and prisoners and staff transferred there from Dunedin Prison and Christchurch Prison's Women's Division. A facilities upgrade in 2011 provided for four mothers and their babies to live together.

The prison provides the Kowhiritanga ('Making Choices') rehabilitation programme designed to address the particular needs of female offenders – many of whom have suffered sexual abuse.

=== Rolleston Prison ===
Rolleston prison is located at Runners Rd in Rolleston, south-west of Christchurch. It was originally established in 1958 as an army detention centre. It was first used as a prison in 1986 when the new Corrective Training Centre was built called the Tawa unit.

The prison was extensively renovated in 1987 to increase capacity and in 1989 the 60 bed Kia Marama unit opened – one of only two such units in the country. The unit delivers group-based treatment within a therapeutic environment to child sex offenders. The programme helps prisoners look at their patterns of behaviour and identify high-risk situations. Evaluations have shown that the programme is very effective in reducing re-offending. In 1992 the 60 bed Kowhai unit opened and an additional two units have been completed since then. Rolleston now holds about 320 male prisoners and employs 93 staff.

Because Rolleston Prison contains prisoners assessed as being of minimal risk to the public, the level of physical security is lower than would be found at many other prisons. It originally did not have a perimeter fence. Instead, individual units had their own secure fencing and the prison has electronic security devices around the perimeter. In 2019 a perimeter fence was installed. Older units at Rolleston are set to close as part of the Department's decision to close down older prisons and build a new 960 bed prison for males at Wiri, Auckland.

=== Otago Corrections Facility ===
Otago Corrections Facility (OCF) is located near Milton. It opened in 2007 and was one of four new prisons that opened between 2005 and 2007. OCF was established as a more humane alternative to the Victorian era Dunedin Prison. Intended to house 335 prisoners, Otago Corrections was designed as a campus with wide open spaces, adequate heating, single bunking and its own prison farm. Initially a low to high-medium facility, OCF was later upgraded to house high-security prisoners. When double bunking was introduced at OCF in 2010, inmate numbers rose to 480.

The prison provides three rehabilitation programmes. The Medium Intensity Rehabilitation Programme is designed for prisoners in the middle risk range – those not considered high risk but still enough of a risk to warrant rehabilitation. The Short Rehabilitation Programme is a brief rehabilitation programme aimed at a smaller number of prisoners who require rehabilitation but do not have enough time in their sentence to complete a longer programme. OCF also has a Drug Treatment Unit for prisoners with drug and alcohol problems. As of 31 July 2023, OCF had the capacity to train 36 men in carpentry, engineering and hospitality. It also had the capacity to employ a total of 136 men for farming and grounds maintenance. Notable rehabilitation projects have included building cabins for Clutha District Council camping grounds and building seed libraries for the Seed Library Community Project in South Otago.

In late February 2023, the Otago Daily Times (ODT) reported that OCF had increased its capacity to 556 beds, including 87 new high-security beds over the past six months. At the time, the Milburn facility housed about 434 inmates. The prison reported 16 assaults on staff in 2022 and a substantial shortfall of 70 staff across various roles. The ODT also reported that OCF had increased its capacity due to the transfer of high-security prisoners from Christchurch Men's Prison following the closure of its high-security units. Corrections Association of New Zealand (CANZ) vice-president Paul Dennehy expressed concern about OCF staff having to manage increasingly violent prisoners, understaffing, and deteriorating facilities.

In 28 July 2023, CANZ secretary Mark Duncan expressed concern that low-security prisoners were being transferred from OCF to Rolleston Prison to accommodate high-security prisoners being transferred from Christchurch Men's Prison. Duncan said that this would have an adverse impact on prisoners' behaviour and staff safety. On 31 July, the ODT reported that Otago Corrections had become the only prison in the South Island equipped to hold high-security prisoners. The newspaper also expressed concern that short staffing would undermine its rehabilitation programmes.

=== Invercargill Prison ===
Invercargill Prison, in Invercargill, holds about 165 prisoners. Built in 1910, the prison operated as a borstal until 1981. In 2012 a rehabilitation programme was introduced at Invercargill Prison.

In May 2021, Invercargill Prison and Invercargill City Libraries launched a programme to boost literacy among prisoners. In December 2021, the Department of Corrections considered converting the prison to a remand facility. This proposal was opposed by prison staff.

In April 2022, the prison's remand unit was closed after a critical Office of the Inspectorate report which found that prisoners in the unit had little access to water, lack of privacy in toilets, and damp mattresses. In September 2023, the Department of Corrections' acting regional commissioner Glenn Morrison confirmed there were no plans to restructure Invercargill Prison and that the facility would continue to host remand and low-to-medium security category sentenced offenders.

In December 2023, The Southland Times reported that six deaths had occurred at Invercargill Prison over the past decade. These included two suicides, three suspected suicides, and one death by natural causes.

== Youth justice residences ==
There are five youth correctional facilities, termed youth justice residences, located in Auckland, Rotorua, Palmerston North and Christchurch. While these facilities have traditionally hosted teenagers aged 16 years and below, a law change in July 2019 has led to the admission of 17 and 18 year olds. All youth justice residences are operated by Oranga Tamariki (the Ministry for Children).

Name	Location	Opened	Gender	Type/Security	Capacity	Ref
Korowai Manaaki Youth Justice Residence	South Auckland		Both	Youth offenders	46	
Whakatakapokai Youth Justice Residence	South Auckland	2021	Both	Youth offenders	15	
Te Maioha o Parekarangi Youth Justice Residence	Rotorua	2010	Both	Youth offenders	30	
Te Au rere a te Tonga Youth Justice Residence	Palmerston North		Male	Youth offenders	40	
Te Puna Wai ō Tuhinapo Youth Justice Residence	Rolleston, Canterbury	2005	Both	Youth offenders	40	

== Military facilities ==
The Services Corrective Establishment (SCE) is the New Zealand Defence Force's (NZDF) sole military prison. Previously based at Ardmore in Auckland, the SCE has been based at Burnham Military Camp near Christchurch since 1995. The prison hosts enlisted personnel who are serving sentences with a maximum of two years. Commissioned officers and enlisted personnel sentenced to a prison term exceeding two years are sent to civilian prisons. The prison's regime consist of a mixture of corrective training and rehabilitation, with the goal of returning inmates to service in the Defence Force.

As of May 2021, it had ten unisex cells. Between 2013 and 2018, nearly 140 personnel were detained at SCE, with an average stay of 14 days. Half of inmates were sent there for drug and alcohol offences, while 20 were sent there for assault-related offences. In August 2025, a Defence Force soldier, who became the first New Zealander convicted of attempted espionage, was sentenced to a prison term of two years at the facility.

In addition to the SCE, the NZDF also operated several cell facilities at RNZAF Base Ohakea at Bulls in the Manawatu District and RNZAF Base Auckland as of May 2021. Other known temporary detention facilities were located aboard HMNZS Philomel and Linton Military Camp near Palmerston North.

== Closed facilities ==
=== Addington Prison ===
Located in the Christchurch suburb of Addington, the prison was built in 1874 under the guidance of Benjamin W. Mountfort, who also designed the Christchurch Cathedral, the Canterbury Museum and the Canterbury Provincial Council Chambers. Initially opened as a women's reformatory, temporary buildings for men were shortly added. In 1913 it become a single-sex women's facility, at which point prisoners were put to work doing laundry for other government organisations. Addington Prison was closed in 1999 and has been converted into a budget backpackers called Jailhouse Accommodation. The Mountfort cell block and remaining perimeter walls are a Heritage New Zealand Historic Place Category 2.

=== Dunedin Prison ===
Dunedin Prison was built (completed) in 1896 and operated until 2007 when all prison services in the region were shifted to the new Otago Corrections Facility near Milton.

=== Napier Prison ===
Napier Prison opened in 1862 on Bluff Hill in Napier. It closed in 1993, with prisoners transferring to Hawke's Bay Regional Prison.

=== New Plymouth Prison ===
New Plymouth Prison used to hold up to 112 minimum to high-medium security prisoners and employed 65 staff. The prison also accommodated offenders on remand. The prison was originally an army hospital in the 1860s during the Taranaki land wars. The site was converted to a prison later that decade. From 1917 to 1952 it held mainly prisoners convicted of homosexual offences. In 2012, Corrections Minister, Anne Tolley announced it would be closed "because old prisons didn't suit modern rehabilitation training and education methods." It closed in 2013.

=== Ohura Prison ===
Ohura Prison opened in 1972. It closed in 2005, because it was understaffed. Ohura was also vulnerable to road closures and flooding. The prison had been built on the site of a miners' hostel. Ohura was a minimum-security prison consisting of a simple two-building complex with no external wire fence. The prison held up to 97 male prisoners. The main cell block had a rebuild in 1997 to increase cell sizes. The prison was for a time converted into bed and breakfast accommodation. It now houses a religious organisation.

=== Waikune Prison ===
Waikune Prison opened in 1921 and closed in 1986. Near the small town of National Park, it held around 100 minimum-security prisoners. Inmates worked in nearby forestry areas, did track maintenance for the Department of Conservation, cleared ski-field roads and did the laundry for Tongariro’s famous Grand Chateau Hotel. In the mid-1980s the prison required a large amount of capital investment to upgrade its buildings and infrastructure. The government of the time, after a select committee hearing, decided to close the facility. Inmates were moved to other sites around the country and the prison officially closed in 1986. The structure and roof of one of the two prison buildings has given way. While there are a few buildings on the site that have potential, overall the buildings are derelict.

=== Wellington Prison ===
Wellington Prison, also known as Mount Crawford, held about 120 prisoners and employed 35 custodial staff. It was built in 1927 at Point Halswell, next to the suburb of Miramar, in Wellington and replaced the original Terrace Gaol in central Wellington. The prison only accommodated prisoners who were on voluntary segregation – prisoners who have asked to be separated from the mainstream prison population.

The Wellington prison was temporarily closed in June 2008 during a "seasonal prison population trough", however it reopened in July 2009 when the national prison population increased once again. In 2012, Corrections Minister, Anne Tolley announced it would be closed permanently "because the old prisons didn't suit modern rehabilitation training and education methods."

== See also ==
- List of prisons
