= Waikeria Prison riots =

Riots at a New Zealand prison in 2020 and 2021

Riots at New Zealand's Waikeria Prison broke out between 29 December 2020 and 3 January 2021. At least twenty-one male prisoners, who were dissatisfied with alleged 'poor living conditions', lit fires and broke out of the cell buildings, and ultimately destroyed the building known as the "Top Jail". The riots came to an end following negotiations involving Māori Party co-leader Rawiri Waititi, and the remaining sixteen prisoners surrendered and were escorted out by Waititi at midday on Sunday 3 January.

Seventeen prisoners were later jointly charged with rioting, burglary using a weapon, and wilfully setting fire to property and endangering life. As of April 2021, all seventeen men have pleaded not guilty and elected trial by jury, and are remanded in custody until early May 2021.

== History ==
Waikeria Prison is located in the town of Waikeria, 45 kilometres south of Hamilton in the Waikato. Built in 1911 with a capacity for 1,031 prisoners, it was once New Zealand's largest prison. In 2012, Prime Minister John Key announced the planned closure of several older prisons, based on lower needs after the creation of the new prison at Wiri, and ongoing maintenance concerns affecting the wellbeing of prisoners and staff. Waikeria was kept open, but had several units closed, resulting in a capacity of 806 prior to the riots.

In 2017 an independent report found the prison in "very poor condition", and the prison's design was criticised for making inmate supervision difficult. Investigators found issues with hygiene, as well as "significant influence" from gangs and noted that "violence was a regular part of prison life" in the high security facility (also known as the "Top Jail").

== Riots ==
Beginning on 29 December 2020, rioting in Waikeria prison led to a fire that caused extensive damage to the prison's top jail facility, with roughly 250 beds destroyed. At least 21 prisoners were involved in the rioting, who subsequently clustered on the roof of the top jail facility. Four subsequently gave up while 17 remained non-compliant. According to Stuff and The New Zealand Herald, those involved in the prison unrest included members of the Comancheros and Mongols gangs including five deportees from Australia.

By 30 December, 49 non-participating prisoners had been evacuated to other prisons while another 163 men were temporarily moved to other locations within the prison. Dr Rawiri Waretini-Karena, an independent adviser to the Department of Corrections, attributed the rioting to the lack of access to rehabilitative education and Māori culture.

Inmates and their relatives have also attributed the rioting to inhumane and unhygienic conditions including the lack of clean water and moldy bread. On 30 December, Corrections chief executive Jeremy Lightfoot confirmed that damage to Waikeria's top jail facility had been substantial and that it was unlikely that prisoners would be accommodated there again. The top jail facility was scheduled to be replaced with a new facility in 2022.

On 2 January 2021, it was reported that the 16 remaining prisoners had accessed the weapons safe and improvised weapons. That same day, relatives of the prisoners along with Māori Party co-leader Rawiri Waititi, New Zealand National Party leader Judith Collins, and National Parry correction spokesperson Simeon Brown called on the Minister of Corrections Kelvin Davis to intervene in the prison protest. Corrections officials had earlier denied Waititi, Brown and National MP Barbara Kuriger access to the prison, stating that they needed the permission of the Corrections Minister Davis.

On 3 January, the 16 remaining prisoners surrendered following negotiations involving Māori Party leader Waititi. During a press conference that same day, Corrections Minister Davis disputed claims that the prison uprising had been sparked by poor living conditions. Since the Waikeria top-jail building "was not fit for anything," remand prisoners housed at Waikeria would be accommodated at other prisons around the country. The Government has launched two inquiries into the causes of the five-day Waikeria prison unrest while the Human Rights Commission had called for a further independent enquiry by the Ombudsman. Due to the damage caused by the prison unrest, closure of the top jail is imminent with the building due to be replaced with a new facility the following year.

== Aftermath ==
In September 2023, 16 prisoners were convicted and jailed for various offenses related to the Waikeria Prison riots. A 17th defendant pleaded not guilty and is scheduled to be tried in 2024. During their sentencings, several defendants unsuccessfully applied to have their culpability reduced due to what they termed "substandard" conditions at Waikeria Prison. Their petitions were rejected by several High Court judges including Justice Christine Gordon. The prison riot caused NZ$50 million worth of damage to the high security unit.
