= Louise Upston =

New Zealand politician

The Honourable Louise Upston MP
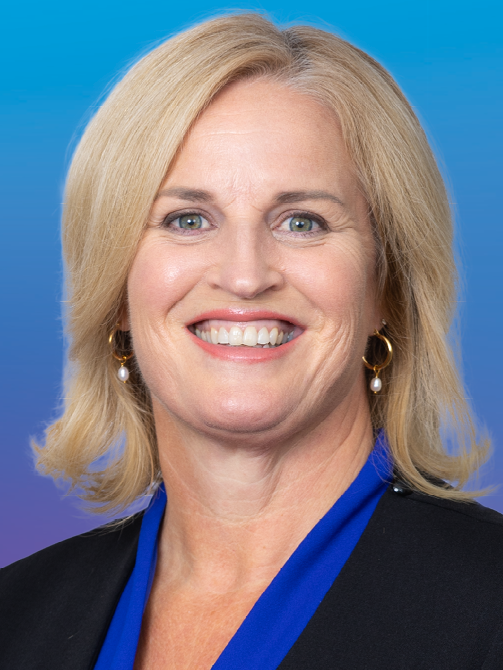
- Upston in 2023

28th Minister for Social Development and Employment
- Incumbent
- Assumed office 27 November 2023
- Prime Minister: Christopher Luxon
- Preceded by: Carmel Sepuloni

40th Minister for Tourism and Hospitality
- Incumbent
- Assumed office 24 January 2025
- Prime Minister: Christopher Luxon
- Preceded by: Matt Doocey

13th Minister of Corrections
- In office 20 December 2016 – 26 October 2017
- Prime Minister: Bill English
- Preceded by: Judith Collins
- Succeeded by: Kelvin Davis

14th Minister for Land Information
- In office 6 October 2014 – 20 December 2016
- Prime Minister: John Key; Bill English
- Preceded by: Michael Woodhouse
- Succeeded by: Mark Mitchell

13th Minister for Women
- In office 8 October 2014 – 20 December 2016
- Prime Minister: John Key; Bill English
- Preceded by: Jo Goodhew
- Succeeded by: Paula Bennett

Senior Government Whip
- In office 29 January 2013 – 7 October 2014
- Prime Minister: John Key
- Preceded by: Michael Woodhouse
- Succeeded by: Tim Macindoe

14th Leader of the House
- Incumbent
- Assumed office 7 April 2026
- Prime Minister: Christopher Luxon
- Preceded by: Chris Bishop

Member of the New Zealand Parliament for Taupō
- Incumbent
- Assumed office 8 November 2008
- Preceded by: Mark Burton

Personal details
- Born: Louise Claire McGill; 14 March 1971 (age 55) North Shore, New Zealand
- Party: National
- Spouse: Hamish Craig (m. 2025)
- Children: 3
- Website: www.louiseupston.co.nz

Louise Claire Upston MP (née McGill, born 14 March 1971) is a New Zealand politician. She was elected as a Member of the New Zealand House of Representatives for Taupō, representing the National Party, in the 2008 general election.

She was Minister for Women and Minister of Corrections in the Fifth National Government. She currently serves as the Minister for Social Development and Employment.

On 2 April 2026, she succeeded Chris Bishop as Leader of the House following a Cabinet reshuffle.

== Early life ==
Louise McGill was born in North Shore to parents Ian and Norma McGill. The youngest of four children, she grew up in East Coast Bays. She attended Rangitoto College, from which she graduated in 1988, and where she was friends with Amy Adams. Since before the age of ten, she had wanted to become a member of parliament and intended to become a lawyer to further her political ambitions.

McGill began law school but did not achieve the minimum grades to enter the second year. When her mother died, she dropped out of university at the age of 19 and instead founded a management consultancy firm, McGill Manning. The firm provided event and project management services and its clients included Air New Zealand, Russell McVeagh, and Datacom Group. She then studied at the Waikato Management School and graduated with a Master of Business Administration.

In the 1990s, McGill became a single mother to her first child. She later described this experience as "the hardest time of my life." She later married Craig Upston, with whom she had two more children. They separated in 2012. She then began a relationship with Hamish Craig, marrying him in 2025. Upston lives in Karapiro.

== Member of Parliament ==
New Zealand Parliament
Years	Term	Electorate	List	Party
2008–2011	49th	Taupō	53	National
2011–2014	50th	Taupō	44	National
2014–2017	51st	Taupō	27	National
2017–2020	52nd	Taupō	19	National
2020–2023	53rd	Taupō	9	National
2023–2026	54th	Taupō	6	National
2026–present	55th	Taupō	7	National

=== Early years, 2008–2014 ===
Upston unsuccessfully sought a National Party candidacy in 2005. She was selected as the party's Taupō electorate candidate in 2008 where she unseated Mark Burton, a Labour cabinet minister who had represented the area for 15 years.

Upston entered parliament at the beginning of the Fifth National Government. In her first term, Upston was appointed to the local government and environment committee, the government administration committee, and the education and science committee. She gave her maiden speech on 16 December 2008, where she stated her priorities were education and "making New Zealand safe again." She received attention in the media for her comments on harsher sentences and sloganised approach to crime: "The police are good. The criminals are bad. It's that simple." Eventually she would soften her views and state her support for investments in prisoner rehabilitation.

During the 2011 New Zealand general election, Upston retained Taupō by a margin of 14,115 votes, defeating Labour candidate Frances Campbell.

In her second term, Upston was appointed the government's junior whip. Following the February 2013 Cabinet reshuffle, she became chief whip. She was also a member of the Māori affairs committee and the local government and environment committee.

=== Minister in Fifth National Government, 2014–2017 ===
During the 2014 New Zealand general election, Upston retained Taupō by a margin of 15,406 votes, defeating Labour candidate Jamie Strange. Upston was promoted into the executive after the 2014 election, as minister outside of Cabinet. She was Minister for Land Information, Minister for Women, Associate Minister for Local Government, and Associate Minister for Tertiary Education, Skills and Employment from October 2014 until December 2016. At the same time, she was a member of the justice and electoral select committee.

As Minister for Women, Upston addressed the 59th session of the United Nations Commission on the Status of Women on 11 March 2015. She used the speech to set out her goals in the portfolio, including supporting women in the workplace and preventing violence against women. The following month, she attracted criticism for refusing to comment on women's rights in the workplace after it was revealed Prime Minister John Key was forced to apologise to a Parnell cafe worker for repeatedly pulling her hair. She attracted further scrutiny in the portfolio for rejecting calls to remove GST on menstrual products and for refusing to comment on an incident involving the mistreatment of a stripper by Chiefs rugby players.

As Minister for Land Information, Upston oversaw the correction of several Māori placenames, including Whanganui and Waiotahe. She also introduced replacement legislation for the Land Transfer Act 1952. In the local government portfolio, she oversaw but later postponed a trial of online voting in the 2016 local elections. She was also involved in governance reviews and the appointment of commissioners at Kaipara District Council and Canterbury Regional Council. In the tertiary education, skills and employment portfolio, she had responsibility for industry training, private training establishments, and adult and community education.

Upston was promoted into Cabinet by new prime minister Bill English in December 2016. She became Minister of Corrections and an associate minister for primary industries (with responsibility for forestry), education, and tertiary education, skills and employment. She held these positions until the government changed in October 2017. As corrections minister, Upston announced that all corrections officers would be required to carry pepper spray, launched mental health pilot programmes for prisoners, and launched a new strategy to manage women offenders.

=== Opposition years, 2017–2023 ===
National lost the 2017 and 2020 elections. Upston became a senior member in the successive National shadow cabinets, serving as social development spokesperson under each of Bill English, Simon Bridges, Todd Muller, Judith Collins, and Christopher Luxon, and sitting on the social services and community committee. She was also spokesperson for land information, social investment and whānau ora (2020–2021), employment (2020–2023), regional economic development (2021), child poverty reduction (2021–2023), and family violence prevention (2023). During the 2017 New Zealand general election, Upston retained Taupō by a margin of 14,335 votes, defeating Labour candidate Ala' Al-Bustanji.

In April 2019, Upston's private member's bill, the Rights for Victims of Insane Offenders Bill, was drawn from the ballot and introduced to Parliament. Upston began working on the bill in 2010 after being contacted by a constituent whose brother was murdered and whose killer was found not guilty by reason of insanity. The bill proposed that, even if they unable to be found guilty of a crime, the court may find an offender has been proven to have acted grievously. Although the bill received unanimous support from all parties, it was sent back to the justice committee for further consideration after the Chief Justice raised concerns. The concerns were ultimately addressed and the bill passed unanimously in December 2021.

During the 2020 New Zealand general election, Upston retained Taupō by a margin of 5,119 votes, defeating Labour candidate Ala' Al-Bustanji.

As social development spokesperson, Upston promoted National's policy of harsher penalties for unemployed people on the jobseeker benefit including a mandatory reapplications every six months, increased use of stand-downs from receiving welfare, and greater direct management of beneficiaries' incomes by the Ministry of Social Development. She claimed that the 2019 report of the Labour Government's Welfare Expert Advisory Group (WEAG) provided evidence that supported sanctions as being "effective in encouraging movement from benefits to work;" this was rejected by WEAG.

=== Minister in Sixth National Government, 2023–present ===
During the 2023 election, Upston retained the Taupō electorate by a margin of 16,505 votes.

In late November 2023, Upston was appointed as Minister of Social Development and Employment, Minister for the Community and Voluntary Sector, and Minister for Child Poverty Reduction.

==== Minister of Social Development ====
In mid February 2024, Upston as Social Development Minister announced that the Government would ramp up benefit sanctions from June 2024 including "work check-ins" for jobseekers who have been on a benefit for at least six months. These check-ins would not apply to those on a sole parent or supported living benefits. Following a Child Poverty Action Group report about high schoolers working long part-time jobs that affected their schooling, Upston attributed the problem to the high cost of living. While ruling out minimum wage increases and student allowances for high schoolers, Upston advocated tax cuts, rebates and helping their parents find work as a means of improving school attendance and educational performance.

In early April 2024, Upston confirmed that the Government and the University of Auckland were exploring options to continue funding the Growing Up in New Zealand longitudinal study. In mid-September 2024, Upston confirmed that the Government would be investing NZ$16.8 million into the longitudinal study over the next four years.

On 24 July, Upston's absence from a Parliamentary sitting led to the withdrawal of the Government's Regulatory Systems (Social Security) Amendment Bill. The Bill was scheduled to have its first debate that morning. Assistant Speaker Maureen Pugh withdrew the bill after Melissa Lee, who was the duty minister in the House of Representatives, declined to speak and motion that the bill be read for the first time. Following the incident, Upston confirmed that the Regulatory Systems (Social Security) Amendment Bill would be taken back to the Business select committee and reintroduced at a later stage.

On 12 August 2024, Upston confirmed the introduction of a traffic light system for the Jobseeker Support benefit, effective immediately, with legislation to expand the system to be introduced in November and expected to come into force in early 2025. Key changes have included extending the benefit sanctions period from one year to two years, requiring Jobseeker beneficiaries to apply every six months, requiring beneficiaries with work obligations to create a jobseeker profile, creating a special payment card for accessing a limited ranges of products and services and new community work sanctions. Upston also promised that the rule of preventing sanctions from cutting benefit pay by more than 50 per cent of job seekers who had children would remain in place.

On 5 October 2025, Upston and Prime Minister Christopher Luxon announced that the Government would tighten welfare eligibility criteria for 18 and 19-year old teenagers; with those having parents earning over NZ$65,000 being ineligible for Jobseeker and other emergency benefits from November 2026. 18 and 19 year olds, with dependent children, or who were estranged from their parents would still be eligible for welfare assistance. She confirmed that the Government would introduce a new means-tested Parental Assistance Test. Upston estimated that 4,300 young people would become ineligible for Jobseeker support in the 2027/28 financial year. Upston said:

We want to be clear with young people, 18 and 19-year-olds and their parents, our expectation is that they are in further education, training or a job, and welfare should be a long way away from their first option. It's about having much higher expectations for young people and their families.

On 20 October 2025, Upston announced that Jobseeker beneficiaries failing an obligation for the first time would be required to undertake at least three job-search activities per week and undergo at least five hours of employment-related training per month. Despite the Government's efforts to reduce the number of beneficiaries, Radio New Zealand reported in mid-March 2026 that the number of welfare recipients had reached a 12-year high of 427,236 in December 2025. The number of Jobseeker beneficiaries also increased by 18 percent from 190,000 in December 2023 to 223,500 in December 2025. In response, Upston attributed the rising beneficiary numbers to the "difficult economic conditions and a tough labour market" caused by the previous Labour government. She claimed that Labour's COVID-19 spending policies drove inflation and caused higher unemployment.

As the minister responsible for a Royal Commission of Inquiry into Abuse in Care recommendation focusing on Gloriavale Christian Community, Upston visited the isolated West Coast commune on 30 January 2026 where she met with Overseeing Shepherd Stephen Steadfast, other community leaders and members. She later told Radio New Zealand that she did not see anything that caused concern about children's safety and said that government agencies monitoring the commune would report any problems. In response, the Gloriavale leavers' lawyer Dennis Gates alleged that Upston had been duped by Gloriavale's leadership and called on her to resign in early March 2026. In response to criticism, Upston defended the visit and said that government agencies were working on a community safety plan for Gloriavale's children.

In September 2026, Upston apologised on behalf of the Government after about 2,400 pensioners and veterans had their winter energy payment entitlements wrongly suspended by the Ministry of Social Development over a three week period commencing on 18 August 2026. These payment errors were the result of an urgent law change creating a backlog of paperwork that Ministry staff could not cope with.

==== Minister for Disabled Issues ====
On 24 April 2024, Upston assumed Penny Simmonds' Disability Issues portfolio following a cabinet reshuffle. The Ministry for Disabled People falls under the oversight of the Ministry of Social Development, which Upston heads.

On 15 August 2024, Upston announced that Whaikaha - Ministry of Disabled People would be restructured as a policy and advisory department and that its support service delivery functions would be assumed by the Ministry of Social Development (MSD). Disabled Persons Assembly chief executive and former Green Party MP Mojo Mathers, disability advocate Blake Forbes-Gentle, CCS Disability Action national policy analyst Phoebe Eden-Mann and Green Party disability spokesperson Kahurangi Carter criticised the government decision, saying that it would adversely affect the ability of disabled people to access support services due to MSD's poor track record of serving the disabled community.

On 29 August, Upston announced that the Government would raise fines for people illegally parking in disabled car parks from NZ$150 to NZ$750 effective 1 October 2024.

On 3 September 2025, Upston confirmed that the Government would roll out changes to the disability support system throughout 2026 with the goal of making it easier for disabled people and their carers to access support payments. Key changes include introducing assessments for new disability applicants from 1 February 2026; introducing a new budget for existing flexible funding users from 1 April 2026; and introducing a new reassessment system for disability applicants from 1 October 2026.

On 12 March 2026, Upston confirmed that the Government would lift restrictions on support payments for disabled people and their carers from 1 April following a review into the funding system. She said that the changes reflected the recommendations of the 2024 independent review and feedback from the disabled community in 2025. The announcement was welcomed by several disability carers including Disability Support Service Transformation general manager Alastair Hill. Emily Writes, the former director of charity Awhi Nga Matua, criticised Upston for not issuing an apology for the harm caused to disabled carers by the 2024 cutbacks.

A Report released by the Ministry for Social Development (MSD) in September 2026 clarifies that over 30,000 beneficiaries were adversely affected by processing errors relating to revised criteria for Confirmation of Circumstances, and MSD staff reductions and incompetence. Many were refused food grants “because food is not a necessity” under Louise Upston’s watch as Minister for MSD. And it is worthy to note she was also publicly dismissive of beneficiaries entitled (in legislation) accommodation assistance on welfare, while asserting it was her right to receive a $52,000 per accommodation perk in respect to a home that she owns freehold. These failings have been widely canvassed in the NZ media such as NewsTalk ZB, RadioNz, & Stuff. And the official MSD review is available MSD Review..

==== Minister for Tourism and Hospitality ====
During a cabinet reshuffle on 19 January 2025, Upston assumed the tourism and hospitality ministerial portfolio. On 14 April, Upston announced that the New Zealand Government would invest NZ$13.5 million in state tourism agency Tourism New Zealand to boost international tourism. Upston and Luxon made a renewed announcement about this funding injection on 9 June, saying that the NZ$13.5 million worth of funding would target the core markets of Australia, the United States and China over the next few years.

On 7 May, Upston and Prime Minister Christopher Luxon announced that the Government would end the requirement for overseas visitors to provide certified translations of supporting documents in a bid to boost tourism.

==== Leader of the House ====
On 2 April 2026, Upston assumed the role of Leader of the House, succeeding Chris Bishop, who had been in the position since the 2023 New Zealand general election. Upston had previously been the deputy leader of the House.

==== 2026 general election ====
During the 2026 New Zealand general election, Upston contested the Taupō electorate for National. She was ranked seventh on the National Party list. Based on preliminary results, Upston retained Taupō for National by a landslide margin of 13,052 votes.

== Political and social views ==
Upston has a conservative voting record on conscience issues. In 2012, she voted to raise the purchase age of alcohol to 20. She voted against the Marriage (Definition of Marriage) Amendment Bill in 2013. She voted against the Abortion Legislation Bill in 2019 and 2020. She voted against the End of Life Choice Bill in 2017 and 2019, including voting against a proposal to hold a referendum on the issue. She was one of only seven MPs to vote against the second reading of the Conversion Practices Prohibition Legislation Act 2022, but voting in favour of it at its third and final reading. After that vote, she described herself as a "proud supporter of the LGBTQI+ community."

In November 2014, Upston stated she is not a feminist when she sang praises of beauty pageants.

New Zealand Parliament
Preceded by Mark Burton	Member of Parliament for Taupō; 2008–present	Incumbent
Political offices
Preceded by Michael Woodhouse	Minister for Land Information; 2014–2016	Succeeded by Mark Mitchell
