= Kelvin Davis (politician) =

New Zealand politician (born 1967)

The Honourable Kelvin Davis
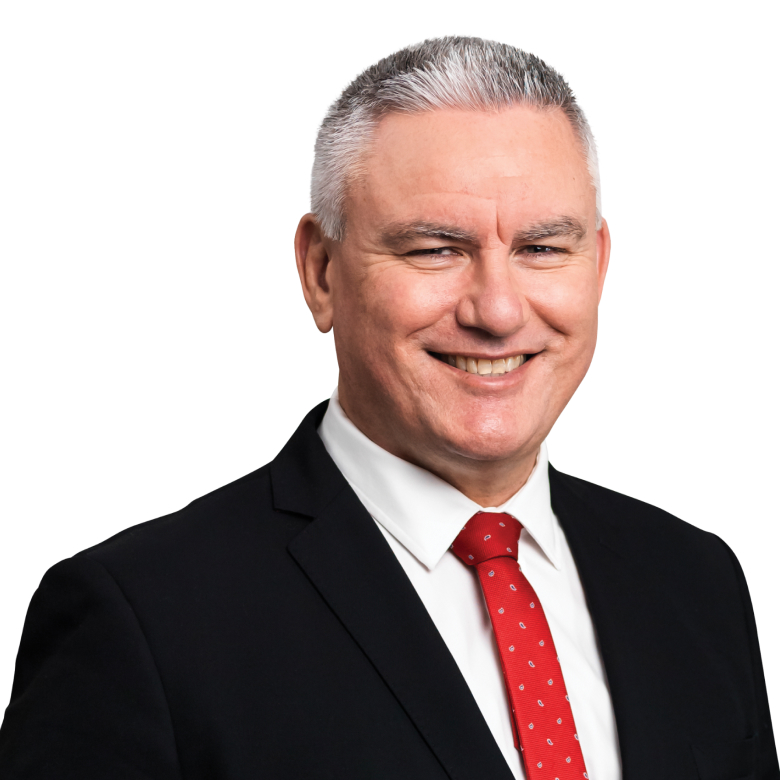
- Davis in 2023

18th Deputy Leader of the Labour Party
- In office 1 August 2017 – 7 November 2023
- Leader: Jacinda Ardern; Chris Hipkins
- Preceded by: Jacinda Ardern
- Succeeded by: Carmel Sepuloni

14th Minister of Corrections
- In office 26 October 2017 – 27 November 2023
- Prime Minister: Jacinda Ardern; Chris Hipkins
- Preceded by: Louise Upston
- Succeeded by: Mark Mitchell

1st Minister for Māori–Crown Relations
- In office 26 October 2017 – 27 November 2023
- Prime Minister: Jacinda Ardern; Chris Hipkins
- Preceded by: Position established
- Succeeded by: Tama Potaka

3rd Minister for Children
- In office 6 November 2020 – 27 November 2023
- Prime Minister: Jacinda Ardern; Chris Hipkins
- Preceded by: Tracey Martin
- Succeeded by: Karen Chhour

36th Minister of Tourism
- In office 26 October 2017 – 6 November 2020
- Prime Minister: Jacinda Ardern
- Preceded by: Paula Bennett
- Succeeded by: Stuart Nash

Deputy Leader of the Opposition
- In office 1 August 2017 – 26 October 2017
- Leader: Jacinda Ardern
- Preceded by: Jacinda Ardern
- Succeeded by: Paula Bennett

Member of the New Zealand Parliament for Te Tai Tokerau
- In office 20 September 2014 – 14 October 2023
- Preceded by: Hone Harawira
- Succeeded by: Mariameno Kapa-Kingi
- Majority: 8,164

Member of the New Zealand Parliament for Labour Party List
- In office 14 October 2023 – 6 February 2024
- Succeeded by: Shanan Halbert (Note: Normally, list MPs do not have individual predecessors or successors, but Davis resigned during a sitting parliament and therefore was succeeded by Halbert.)
- In office 23 May 2014 – 20 September 2014
- Preceded by: Shane Jones (Note: Normally, list MPs do not have individual predecessors or successors, but Jones resigned during a sitting parliament and therefore was succeeded by Davis.)
- In office 8 November 2008 – 26 November 2011

Personal details
- Born: Kelvin Glen Davis; 2 March 1967 (age 59) Kawakawa, New Zealand
- Party: Labour
- Website: Labour website

Kelvin Glen Davis (born 2 March 1967) is a New Zealand politician. He was a member of the House of Representatives, and was a senior minister in the Sixth Labour Government and the deputy leader of the New Zealand Labour Party from 2017 to 2023.

A former teacher, Davis was first elected as a list MP in 2008. He was not re-elected in 2011, but returned to Parliament as a list MP in May 2014 and went on to win the electorate of Te Tai Tokerau that September. He held the electorate for two further elections, but was defeated in the 2023 election. After briefly returning to Parliament as a list MP, Davis announced he would retire from politics on Waitangi Day, 6 February 2024.

During the Sixth Labour Government, Davis served as the Minister of Corrections, Minister for Children, Minister for Māori–Crown Relations, Minister of Tourism, and Associate Minister of Education (Māori Education).

== Early life and career ==
Born in Kawakawa on 2 March 1967, and raised at Karetu in the Bay of Islands, Davis affiliates to the Ngāpuhi iwi and the Ngāti Manu hapū. He is the third of four children to Glenys (née Clow) and Panapa Davis. While Davis' paternal grandparents were native speakers of te reo Māori, his father spoke only English and Davis did not begin learning Māori until secondary school. He attended Bay of Islands College in Kawakawa from 1980 to 1984 and went on to the Auckland College of Education (1985–1987), where he earned a diploma of teaching. He met his wife, Moira, at teachers' college; they have three children.

Davis had a 20-year career in education. He taught at Koru School in Māngere (1988–1990) and Bay of Islands Intermediate School in Kawakawa (1991–1993), before becoming principal of Karetu School near Kawakawa (1994–1998). He then worked for the Education Advisory Service (1998–1999) and the education improvement and development project Te Putahitanga Matauranga (2000). He was principal of Kaitaia Intermediate School from 2001 to 2007 and was crediting with "turning around" the previously struggling school.

== Member of Parliament ==
New Zealand Parliament
Years	Term	Electorate	List	Party
2008–2011	49th	List	33	Labour
2014	50th	List	23	Labour
2014–2017	51st	Te Tai Tokerau	18	Labour
2017–2020	52nd	Te Tai Tokerau	2	Labour
2020–2023	53rd	Te Tai Tokerau	2	Labour
2023–2024	54th	List	2	Labour

=== Early political career ===
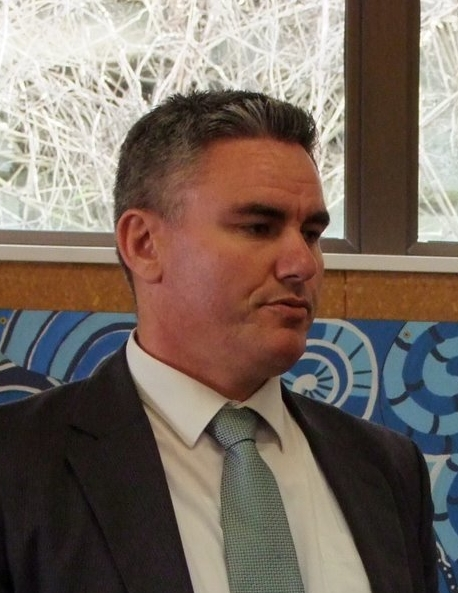
Davis in 2009

In the 2008 general election Davis stood for the Labour Party in the Te Tai Tokerau seat after being recruited by Labour MP Shane Jones. Davis failed to unseat the incumbent Hone Harawira of the Māori Party, but was elected to the 49th New Zealand Parliament by way of the party list. The Fifth Labour Government was defeated in the election and, in his first term, Davis was assigned opposition portfolios as the Labour spokesperson for biosecurity and associate spokesperson for education, Māori affairs and tourism. He was a member of the Māori affairs committee.

Harawira left the Māori Party in early 2011, formed the Mana Party and resigned from parliament to seek a fresh mandate in a by-election for Te Tai Tokerau. Davis ran for Labour, but Harawira retook the seat. Davis stood for the seat in the November 2011 general election, but placed second to Harawira for a third time and also failed to re-enter parliament from the party list. Davis announced his retirement from politics and took up a job with the Ministry of Education in Kaitaia, working in Māori education.

=== Return to politics ===
Davis was re-selected as Labour's candidate in Te Tai Tokerau for the September 2014 general election. Shane Jones then resigned from Parliament months prior to the election, and Davis assumed his place in the House of Representatives on 23 May 2014, as he was by then the highest-ranking non-MP on Labour's 2011 party list. He became Labour's associate spokesperson for corrections.

Harawira's Mana Party formed a coalition with the Kim Dotcom-founded Internet Party for the 2014 election. This resulted in Davis getting endorsements from Winston Peters of New Zealand First party and prime minister John Key of the National Party. Even the candidate for the Māori Party, Te Hira Paenga, reminded voters of the importance of strategic voting. Davis won the seat, unseating Harawira and ending the representation of the Mana Party in Parliament. In the first year of the 51st Parliament, Davis was a member of the law and order committee. Thereafter he sat on the Māori affairs committee and was that committee's deputy chair in 2017.

Davis became Labour's corrections spokesperson. In 2015, he criticised private prison provider Serco's management of inmates, alleging 'corruption' at the Mount Eden remand facility. Following an inquiry, Serco lost its contract to run the facility and Minister of Corrections Sam Lotu-Iiga was relieved of his post. Davis also criticised the Australian government for its incarceration of New Zealand expatriates facing deportation and visited a detention centre on Christmas Island. Davis also drew attention to the disproportionately high number of Māori in the New Zealand prison system, with Māori comprising 50.9% of the prison population despite making up just 15% of New Zealand's population.

A member's bill in Davis' name was drawn from the ballot and introduced to Parliament in November 2016. The Housing Corporation (Affordable Housing Development) Amendment Bill proposed an early version of Labour's KiwiBuild policy which would require the Minister of Housing to arrange for 10,000 houses to be built each year. The bill was defeated at its first reading in March 2017.

=== Becoming deputy leader ===
On 1 August 2017, Davis was appointed deputy leader of the Labour Party, serving under Jacinda Ardern. Davis' selection for the position was seen as balancing Ardern's liberalism and warmth with Davis's perceived conservatism and the more aggressive style of politics he had displayed as corrections spokesperson. Previously, Davis had led the Māori caucus within the Labour Party. On becoming deputy leader, Davis said his promotion would give a "sense of satisfaction" to Māori within the party and more generally. In a 2023 interview, Davis admitted he first turned down the role when it was offered to him. He was encouraged to accept the position by former Labour deputy leader Annette King and nominated by another former deputy, Grant Robertson.

On 1 September 2017, Ardern corrected Davis after he publicly said that Labour would campaign on a capital gains tax policy during the 2020 general election rather than implementing it mid-term. On 19 September, Davis indicated that he was willing to sacrifice his potential position as deputy prime minister in order for Labour to form a coalition government with either New Zealand First or the Green Party.

== Minister in Sixth Labour Government ==
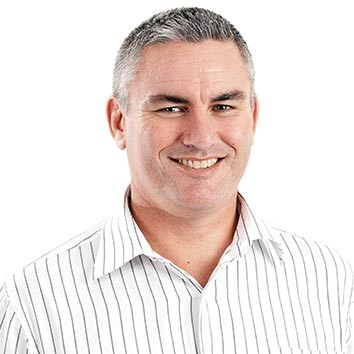
Ministerial portrait, 2017

In the 2017 general election, Davis was re-elected in Te Tai Tokerau, defeating Mana Movement leader Harawira by 4,807 votes. Labour, New Zealand First and the Green Party formed a coalition government in which Davis was the third-ranked Cabinet minister. He was appointed to the new role of Minister for Māori–Crown Relations: Te Arawhiti, Minister of Corrections, Minister of Tourism, and Associate Minister of Education with responsibility for Māori education. Labour continued as a majority government after the 2020 general election, in which Davis won a third term as Te Tai Tokerau MP over new Māori Party candidate Mariameno Kapa-Kingi. Davis continued in most of his ministerial roles after the 2020 election, but traded the tourism portfolio to be Minister for Children.

Although the deputy leader of a single-party government typically would become deputy prime minister, Davis declined the position and instead remained third in Cabinet. It was reported that his poor performances in Parliament's question time was a factor in his decision. In 2017, during his first stint as acting prime minister, Stuff.co.nz writer Jo Moir described his performance in the debating chamber as a "trainwreck." In 2020, Stuff further reported, "it is widely considered, on both sides of the House, that he underperforms when put under the media or parliamentary spotlight" and described finance minister Grant Robertson as Ardern's de-facto political deputy. Robertson took the position after Davis declined. When Ardern resigned, Davis ruled himself out of contesting the 2023 Labour Party leadership election but continued as deputy party leader under Chris Hipkins until Labour's election loss in late 2023.

=== Minister for Māori–Crown Relations: Te Arawhiti ===
The Māori–Crown relations portfolio was created at the beginning of the Sixth Labour Government; Davis was the first to hold it. He oversaw the establishment of a new government department, Te Arawhiti, the Office for Māori Crown Relations, in 2018 to lead the portfolio's work and held a series of hui to determine its focus. In 2023, shortly before leaving the portfolio, Davis described its purpose as improving the capacity and capabilities of the Pākehā public service into te ao Māori, via the Treaty of Waitangi, "so that they get to know us as Māori, hopefully our language, our customs, why we think, feel and behave as we do and have the demands that we do as Māori, so that Māori don’t have to continuously justify our world view to Government agencies." In 2018, after his first year in the portfolio, Davis was praised by political scientist Bronwyn Hayward, who said that although his work was "below the beltway of gallery commentary... outside the Wellington bubble, he has been everywhere: visiting marae, listening, rebuilding trust."

=== Minister of Corrections ===
As Minister of Corrections, Davis has stressed the need to address the high rates of incarceration of Māori people. In August 2018, he called for a change to "a level of imprisonment that is simply devastating our Māori whānau and communities". By the end of Davis' term in office, the prison population overall had reduced from 213 people per 100,000 in 2018, near the highest in the OECD, to 149 per 100,000. Two of the policies advanced to achieve this were supporting defendants to be bailed, rather than held in prison on remand, and enabling prisoners to access a parole readiness scheme earlier in their sentence. However, Davis was accused by his National Party counterpart Mark Mitchell of focusing on emptying prisons rather than reducing crime.

During the Waikeria Prison riots that occurred between 29 December 2020 and 3 January 2021, Davis declined to issue public statements on the grounds that doing so would encourage other prisoners to take similar action and that he wanted to leave the response to experts. The Corrections Minister's silence during the five-day standoff drew criticism from the National Party's corrections spokesperson Simeon Brown and Māori Party co-leader Rawiri Waititi, with the former criticising Davis' alleged lack of leadership and the latter saying that the prisoners were protesting their right to basic needs such as clean water, insufficient clothing, and washing facilities. Following the prisoners' negotiated surrender on 3 January, Davis disputed the prisoners' claims that the unrest had been sparked by inhumane and unhygienic conditions at the prison. He also said that "[the men] damaged property worth hundreds of thousands of dollars, and they put their own lives and the health and safety of staff and other prisoners at risk." An investigation into the prison riots was conducted by chief ombudsman Peter Boshier. The report recommended the Department of Corrections urgently address workplace culture and leadership issues; Davis said some of the comments in the report was unfair because that work was already underway.

=== Minister for Children ===
Davis had been critical of Oranga Tamariki, the Ministry of Children, before his appointment as Minister for Children in November 2020, but resisted calls from Te Pāti Māori to close down the agency. He refused to express confidence in its chief executive, Grainne Moss and met with the public service commissioner about the future leadership of the agency. Moss resigned in January 2021. Soon after, Davis announced a ministerial advisory board that would investigate Oranga Tamariki's criticised policy of uplifting children from their families. Following the board's advice, Davis began reforms to devolve Oranga Tamariki services to iwi and community providers.

In September 2022, Davis made remarks during a Parliamentary debate telling the ACT Party's children spokesperson Karen Chhour to "enter the Māori world" and stop looking at the world through a "vanilla lens." Chhour had questioned Davis about the relationship between Oranga Tamariki and the Māori group Te Whānau o Waipareira Trust, which was being investigated for financing Māori Party candidate John Tamihere's campaign during the 2020 election. Davis' remarks had offended Chhour, who is Māori from the Ngāpuhi iwi, who stated that Davis' remarks had taken away her mana (prestige). Davis' remarks were condemned as racist by ACT leader David Seymour, and ACT urged Ardern to order Davis to apologise and to suspend him. Davis initially defended his remarks, but subsequently phoned Chhour and apologised to her.

== Political views ==
Davis said, in an exit interview after his retirement, that he got into politics because he "wanted to do right and do well for Māori." In another interview he said that "the Treaty is the foundation of all the decisions I made." Davis has been described as coming from the more conservative, right wing of the Labour Party, although he voted in support of the End of Life Choice Act 2019 and Abortion Legislation Act 2020. Davis broke from Labour Party policy and personally supported charter schools in New Zealand; he said they enable Māori to have greater autonomy over the education of their children and said he would resign if the two charter schools in his electorate were closed. The schools were not closed but were transitioned to become state-integrated schools. Davis stated in 2014 that he was opposed to deep-sea oil drilling but not to mining on land in principle.

== Retirement from politics ==
During the 2023 New Zealand general election, Davis lost his Te Tai Tokerau seat to Māori Party candidate Mariameno Kapa-Kingi by a margin of 517 votes. Davis was re-elected to Parliament on the Labour party list and was appointed Labour's spokesperson for Māori–Crown relations and Treaty of Waitangi negotiations. Davis was ranked 20th, much lower than his position in the previous government; Labour leader Chris Hipkins said that Davis had asked to "step away from the front line."

During the election campaign, Davis said he wanted to be re-elected as Te Tai Tokerau MP and, if he lost that race, would retire from politics rather than continue as a list MP, "to allow whoever is successful to have free rein." On 15 December 2023, two months after being elected as a list MP, Davis announced that he would resign as an MP, with his last day being Waitangi Day, 6 February 2024. He indicated he would work as an indigenous relations consultant in Australia. His retirement and that of fellow Labour MP Rino Tirikatene allowed both Tracey McLellan and Shanan Halbert to reenter Parliament on the Labour Party list.

On 5 December 2023, Davis was granted retention of the title The Honourable, in recognition of his term as a member of the Executive Council.

Davis was appointed to the Māori Education Ministerial Advisory Group by education minister Erica Stanford for a two-year term, starting in May 2026.

== Notes ==
New Zealand Parliament
Preceded by Hone Harawira	Member of Parliament for Te Tai Tokerau; 2014–2023	Succeeded by Mariameno Kapa-Kingi
Political offices
Preceded by Jacinda Ardern	Deputy Leader of the Opposition; 2017	Succeeded by Paula Bennett
Preceded by Paula Bennett	Minister of Tourism; 2017–2020	Succeeded by Stuart Nash
Preceded by Louise Upston	Minister of Corrections; 2017–2023	Succeeded by Mark Mitchell
New ministerial post	Minister for Māori–Crown Relations; 2017–2023	Succeeded by Tama Potaka
Preceded by Tracey Martin	Minister for Children; 2020–2023	Succeeded by Karen Chhour
Party political offices
Preceded by Jacinda Ardern	Deputy Leader of the Labour Party; 2017–2023	Succeeded by Carmel Sepuloni
