= Minister for Māori Crown Relations =

Position in the Government of New Zealand

- Coat of arms of New Zealand

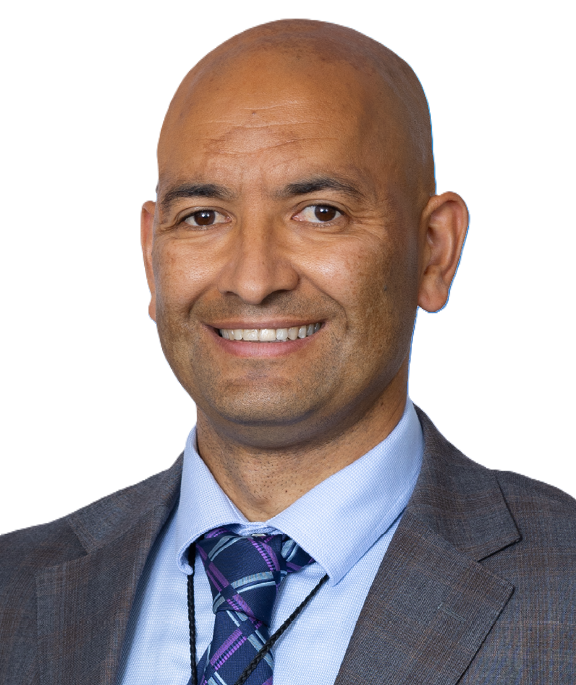
- Incumbent; Tama Potaka since 27 November 2023
- Ministry of Justice
- Style: The Honourable
- Member of: Cabinet of New Zealand; Executive Council
- Reports to: Prime Minister of New Zealand
- Appointer: Governor-General of New Zealand
- Term length: At His Majesty's pleasure
- Formation: 2017
- First holder: Kelvin Davis
- Salary: $288,900

The Minister for Māori Crown Relations is a minister in the New Zealand Government responsible for overseeing Te Arawhiti, the Office of Māori Crown Relations.

== Role and responsibilities ==
The role was created in October 2017, following the 2017 New Zealand election and the formation of the Sixth Labour Government. Its first occupant was Te Tai Tokerau MP Kelvin Davis; Davis had initially expected to be appointed Treaty Negotiations minister, but his Ngāpuhi heritage proved too much of a conflict of interest, due to Ngāpuhi and the Crown's ongoing efforts to broker a Treaty settlement.

The portfolio differs from the similar Treaty of Waitangi Negotiations portfolio, which is responsible for brokering Treaty settlements between Iwi and the Crown, and is instead responsible for ensuring the that Government honors its settlement commitments with Māori. The minister is also responsible for coordinating significant Māori/Crown events, ensuring engagement between the government and Māori is meaningful, and providing ministerial oversight of Te Arawhiti, the Office of Māori Crown Relations. During the Sixth Labour Government, the holder of the portfolio chaired the Cabinet Māori Crown Relations: Te Arawhiti Committee.

== List of ministers ==
Key

Labour National

No.	Name	Portrait	Term of office		Prime Minister
1	Kelvin Davis		26 October 2017	27 November 2023	Ardern
1	Kelvin Davis		26 October 2017	27 November 2023	Hipkins
2	Tama Potaka		27 November 2023	present	Luxon
