= Te Tari Whakatau =

New Zealand government agency

- Office of Treaty Settlements and Takutai Moana (English)

Departmental agency overview
- Formed: January 1, 2019
- Preceding Departmental agency: Office of Treaty Settlements
- Type: Departmental Agency
- Jurisdiction: New Zealand
- Headquarters: Justice Centre, 19 Aitken St, Wellington, New Zealand
- Minister responsible: Paul Goldsmith, Minister for Treaty of Waitangi Negotiations
- Departmental agency executive: Justine Smith, Chief Executive
- Website: www.tearawhiti.govt.nz

Te Tari Whakatau, also called the Office of Treaty Settlements and Takutai Moana, is a public service departmental agency in New Zealand. Its focus is resolving historical Treaty of Waitangi settlements and supporting Takutai Moana determinations.

Previously the office was known as Te Arawhiti (lit. 'The Bridge'), the Office for Māori Crown Relations and, earlier, the Office of Treaty Settlements.

== History ==
=== Te Arawhiti ===
In 2017 the Labour-led government established a new ministerial position, the Minister for Māori Crown Relations, which was assigned to Kelvin Davis. In 2018, Davis led a public engagement process to establish the portfolio mandate which included twenty hui (meetings) attended by 1600 people and attracted 227 written or online submissions. This process led to the establishment of Te Arawhiti as a new departmental agency within the Ministry of Justice, superseding the former Office of Treaty Settlements which had been a unit within the ministry. Te Arawhiti also consolidated other existing government units, including the Crown/Māori Relations Unit, the Takutai Moana Team and the Settlement Commitments Unit.

In late May 2024, 1News reported that Te Arawhiti had overspent its budget, with expenses rising to NZ$30 million. While the previous Labour Government had allocated the agency NZ$12 million in 2023, this was not enough to cover its operating expenses including fees for settling Treaty of Waitangi claims. As a result, 200 claimants including the Ngātiwai groups were facing uncertainty in having their claims settled.

In early July 2024, Te Arawhiti proposed cutting 13 jobs. The department was directed to cut 6.5% of its budget as part of the National-led government's wider public sector cuts.

=== Te Tari Whakatau ===
On 13 August 2024, Crown–Māori Relations Minister Tama Potaka announced that Te Arawhiti's monitoring and Treaty of Waitangi settlements compliance functions would be shifted to Te Puni Kōkiri (the Ministry for Māori Development). This decision was criticised by Opposition MPs as a backward step in the Crown's post-settlement relationship with iwi Māori.

On 24 February 2025, the Government approved the new name the Office of Treaty Settlements and Takutai Moana: Te Tari Whakatau to reflect the agency's scaled-down functions.

== Organisational structure ==
Te Tari Whakatau is led by a chief executive and two deputy chief executives.

- Chief Executive, Te Tari Whakatau
  - Deputy Chief Executive, Treaty Reconciliation and Takutai Moana
  - Deputy Chief Executive, Policy, Legal and Corporate
