= Whangaparāoa (electorate) =

- Single-member general constituency for the New Zealand House of Representatives
- Interactive map of boundaries from the 2026 election
- Formation: 2020
- Region: Auckland
- Character: Suburban
- Term: 3 years

Member for Whangaparāoa
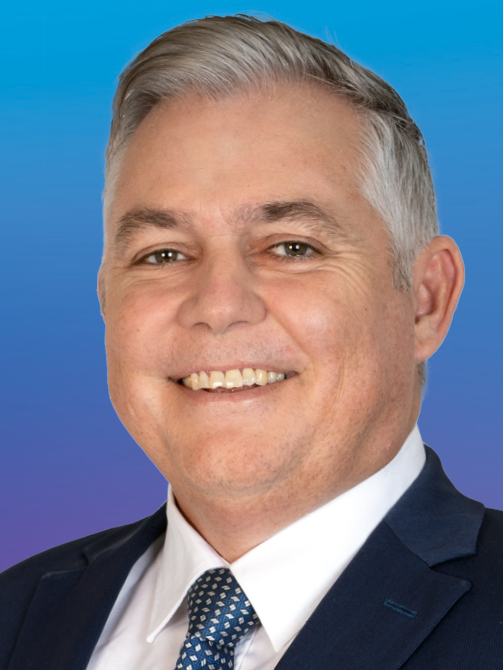
- Mark Mitchell since 17 October 2020
- Party: National
Party vote distribution

Whangaparāoa is an electorate in the New Zealand House of Representatives. It was first created for the 2020 New Zealand general election and is represented by Mark Mitchell of the National Party; Mitchell had previously been the representative for the now abolished Rodney electorate.

== Population centres ==
The electorate is located on the northern fringe of the Auckland metropolitan area, in the former Rodney District. It is centred on the Whangaparāoa Peninsula, and more broadly the Hibiscus Coast. It also extends south to include Dairy Flat, Coatesville, Paremoremo and some of the suburb of Albany, reaching the northern coast of the Waitematā Harbour.

== History ==
Map of boundaries at the 2020 and 2023 general elections

Whangaparāoa was created in the 2019/20 electoral redistribution. Rapid population growth in the area necessitated the splitting of the former Rodney electorate, with the northern section around Warkworth being incorporated into the new Kaipara ki Mahurangi electorate, and the rest of the electorate becoming Whangaparāoa. A section around Coatesville and Dairy Flat was added from the former electorate of Helensville to bring the new electorate into quota tolerance. Continued population growth in the area saw the communities of Lucas Heights and Pāremoremo transferred to East Coast Bays before the 2026 general election to remain proportional.

The electorate is reasonably safe for National, with the final MP for Rodney Mark Mitchell transferring to the seat upon its creation.

=== Members of Parliament ===
National

Election	Winner
2020 election	Mark Mitchell
2023 election	Mark Mitchell

As of 2023 no candidates who have contested the Whangaparāoa electorate have been returned as list MPs.

== Election results ==
=== 2026 election ===
The next election will be held on 7 November 2026. Candidates for Whangaparāoa are listed at Candidates in the 2026 New Zealand general election by electorate § Whangaparāoa. Official results will be available after 27 November 2026.

=== 2023 election ===
2023 general election: Whangaparāoa
Notes:	Blue background denotes the winner of the electorate vote. Pink background denotes a candidate elected from their party list. Yellow background denotes an electorate win by a list member, or other incumbent. A ✓ or ✗ denotes status of any incumbent, win or lose respectively.						
Party	Candidate	Votes	%	±%	Party votes	%	±%
National	✓ Mark Mitchell	30,742	66.45	+14.02	25,091	53.20	+16.65
Labour	Estefania Muller Pallarès	7,366	15.92	−19.29	7,202	15.27	−24.73
Green	Lorraine Newman	3,487	7.53	+7.53	3,584	7.60	+2.72
ACT	Simon Angelo	2,522	5.45	+1.58	5,627	11.93	+1.26
NZ Loyal	Jeanette Wilson	1,489	3.21	+3.21	630	1.33	+1.33
DemocracyNZ	Craig Laybourn	652	1.40	+1.40	157	0.33	+0.33
NZ First					2,952	6.26	+4.12
Opportunities					770	1.63	+0.42
NewZeal					460	0.97	+0.97
Te Pāti Māori					222	0.47	+0.27
Legalise Cannabis					131	0.27	—
Freedoms NZ					92	0.19	+0.19
Animal Justice					91	0.19	+0.19
New Conservatives					65	0.13	−2.20
Women's Rights					36	0.07	+0.07
Leighton Baker Party					29	0.06	+0.06
New Nation					16	0.03	+0.03
Informal votes		530			120		
Total valid votes		46,788			47,275		
National hold	Majority	23,376	50.53	+33.31			

=== 2020 election ===
2020 general election: Whangaparāoa
Notes:	Blue background denotes the winner of the electorate vote. Pink background denotes a candidate elected from their party list. Yellow background denotes an electorate win by a list member, or other incumbent. A ✓ or ✗ denotes status of any incumbent, win or lose respectively.						
Party	Candidate	Votes	%	±%	Party votes	%	±%
National	✓ Mark Mitchell	23,822	52.43	—	16,696	36.55	—
Labour	Lorayne Ferguson	15,999	35.21	—	18,217	40.00	—
ACT	Paul Grace	1,757	3.87	—	4,872	10.67	—
New Conservative	Fiona Mackenzie	1,486	3.27	—	1,028	2.25	—
Advance NZ	Kathryn Flay	659	1.45	—	525	1.15	—
Sustainable NZ	John Davies	605	1.33	—	65	0.14	—
Outdoors	Tricia Cheel	400	0.88	—	48	0.11	—
Green					2,227	4.88	—
NZ First					979	2.14	—
Opportunities					554	1.21	—
Legalise Cannabis					124	0.27	—
Māori Party					91	0.20	—
Sustainable NZ					20	0.05	—
ONE					55	0.12	—
TEA					39	0.09	—
Social Credit					11	0.024	—
Vision New Zealand					9	0.019	—
Heartland					3	0.006	—
Informal votes		705			180		
Total valid votes		45,433			45,678		
Turnout		45,678					
National win new seat	Majority	7,823	17.22				
