= Minister for Tourism and Hospitality (New Zealand) =

New Zealand minister of the Crown

- Coat of arms of New Zealand

- Flag of New Zealand

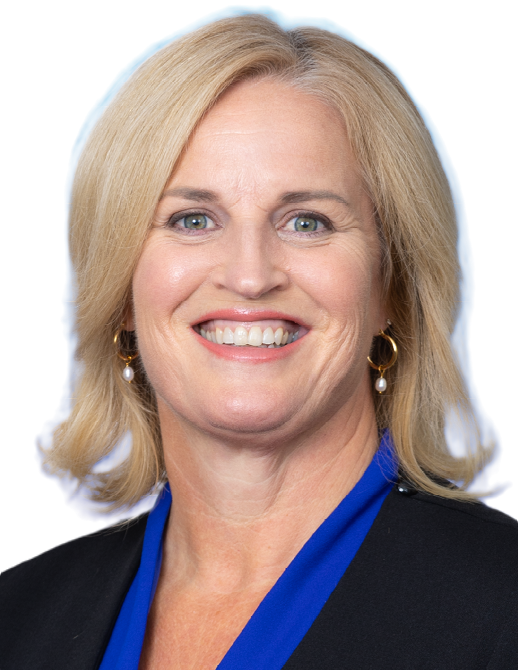
- Incumbent; Louise Upston since 24 January 2025
- Tourism New Zealand
- Style: The Honourable
- Member of: Cabinet of New Zealand; Executive Council
- Reports to: Prime Minister of New Zealand
- Appointer: Governor-General of New Zealand
- Term length: At His Majesty's pleasure
- Formation: 6 August 1906
- First holder: Sir Joseph Ward (as Minister for Tourist and Health Resorts)
- Salary: $288,900
- Website: www.beehive.govt.nz

The Minister for Tourism and Hospitality is a minister in the New Zealand Government appointed by the Prime Minister to be in charge of supporting and promoting tourism and hospitality. The current Minister for Tourism and Hospitality is Louise Upston.

== Background ==
The office was established in 1906 as the Minister for the Tourist and Health Resort Department. Later, it was known more simply as the Minister for Tourist and Health Resorts. From 1963 to 2023 the portfolio had the single title of Minister of Tourism. A related portfolio, sometimes held alongside the tourism portfolio, was Minister in charge of Publicity.

Historically, the Minister of Tourism held the lowest-ranking position in the cabinet during the 1960s and 1970s, although it was held by senior minister Mike Moore in the mid-1980s, prime minister John Key from 2008 to 2016, and senior ministers Paula Bennett and Kelvin Davis from 2016 to 2020.

Since 2023, the portfolio title has been Minister for Tourism and Hospitality.

== Responsibilities ==
Historically, the Minister was responsible for overseeing the Department of Tourist and Health Resorts which was a separate government department during three distinct periods: 1901 to 1909, 1912 to 1930, and 1945 to 1991. From 1954 the department's name was the Tourist and Publicity Department. Its responsibilities included running government-owned hotels and managing publicly owned scenic assets. Under the now repealed Tourist and Publicity Department Act 1963, the Minister of Tourism had authority to establish and operate travel agencies, arrange and operate group coach tours, and establish and operate tourist services, attractions, amenities, and facilities, although these functions could be delegated to the general manager of the department.

Today, the Minister continues to be responsible for supporting and promoting tourism and hospitality in New Zealand. They are responsible for Tourism New Zealand, which is the Crown entity responsible for marketing New Zealand as a tourist destination. They are the responsible minister for the Freedom Camping Act 2011, which enables local government to regulate freedom camping. The Minister receives administrative and policy support from the Ministry of Business, Innovation and Employment.

== List of ministers ==
The following ministers have held the office of Minister of Tourism.

Key

Liberal Reform United Labour National

No.	Name	Portrait	Term of Office		Prime Minister
As Minister for Tourist and Health Resorts
1	Joseph Ward		6 August 1906	6 January 1909	Ward
2	Thomas Mackenzie		6 January 1909	10 July 1912	Ward
2	Thomas Mackenzie		6 January 1909	10 July 1912	Mackenzie
3	Heaton Rhodes		10 July 1912	12 August 1915	Massey
4	Robert McNab		12 August 1915	3 February 1917	Massey
5	William MacDonald		17 February 1917	22 August 1919	Massey
6	William Nosworthy		4 September 1919	10 December 1928	Massey
6	William Nosworthy		4 September 1919	10 December 1928	Bell
6	William Nosworthy		4 September 1919	10 December 1928	Coates
(1)	Joseph Ward		10 December 1928	28 May 1930	Ward
7	Philip De La Perrelle		28 May 1930	22 September 1931	Forbes
8	Adam Hamilton		22 September 1931	6 December 1935	Forbes
9	Frank Langstone		6 December 1935	21 December 1942	Savage
9	Frank Langstone		6 December 1935	21 December 1942	Fraser
10	Bill Parry		18 October 1943	13 December 1949	Fraser
11	Frederick Doidge		13 December 1949	13 September 1951	Holland
12	William Bodkin		13 September 1951	26 November 1954	Holland
13	Eric Halstead		26 November 1954	23 March 1956	Holland
14	Dean Eyre		23 March 1956	12 December 1957	Holland
14	Dean Eyre		23 March 1956	12 December 1957	Holyoake
15	John Mathison		12 December 1957	12 December 1960	Nash
As Minister of Tourism
16	Tom Shand		12 December 1960	15 May 1961	Holyoake
(14)	Dean Eyre		15 May 1961	12 December 1966	Holyoake
17	Robert Muldoon		15 February 1967	4 March 1967	Holyoake
18	David Thomson		4 March 1967	12 December 1969	Holyoake
19	Bert Walker		12 December 1969	8 December 1972	Holyoake
19	Bert Walker		12 December 1969	8 December 1972	Marshall
20	Whetu Tirikatene-Sullivan		8 December 1972	12 December 1975	Kirk
20	Whetu Tirikatene-Sullivan		8 December 1972	12 December 1975	Rowling
21	Harry Lapwood		12 December 1975	13 December 1978	Muldoon
22	Warren Cooper		13 December 1978	12 February 1981	Muldoon
23	Derek Quigley		12 February 1981	11 December 1981	Muldoon
24	Rob Talbot		11 December 1981	26 July 1984	Muldoon
25	Mike Moore		26 July 1984	24 August 1987	Lange
26	Phil Goff		24 August 1987	10 January 1988	Lange
27	Jonathan Hunt		10 January 1988	8 August 1989	Lange
28	Fran Wilde		8 August 1989	2 November 1990	Palmer
28	Fran Wilde		8 August 1989	2 November 1990	Moore
29	John Banks		2 November 1990	1 November 1996	Bolger
30	Murray McCully		1 November 1996	27 April 1999	Bolger
30	Murray McCully		1 November 1996	27 April 1999	Shipley
31	Lockwood Smith		27 April 1999	10 December 1999	Shipley
32	Mark Burton		10 December 1999	19 October 2005	Clark
33	Damien O'Connor		19 October 2005	19 November 2008	Clark
34	John Key		19 November 2008	12 December 2016	Key
35	Paula Bennett		12 December 2016	26 October 2017	English
36	Kelvin Davis		26 October 2017	6 November 2020	Ardern
37	Stuart Nash		6 November 2020	1 February 2023	Ardern
37	Stuart Nash		6 November 2020	1 February 2023	Hipkins
38	Peeni Henare		1 February 2023	27 November 2023	Hipkins
As Minister of Tourism and Hospitality
39	Matt Doocey		27 November 2023	24 January 2025	Luxon
40	Louise Upston		24 January 2025	present	Luxon
