= Mark Mitchell (New Zealand politician) =

New Zealand politician (born 1968)

The Honourable Mark Mitchell MP
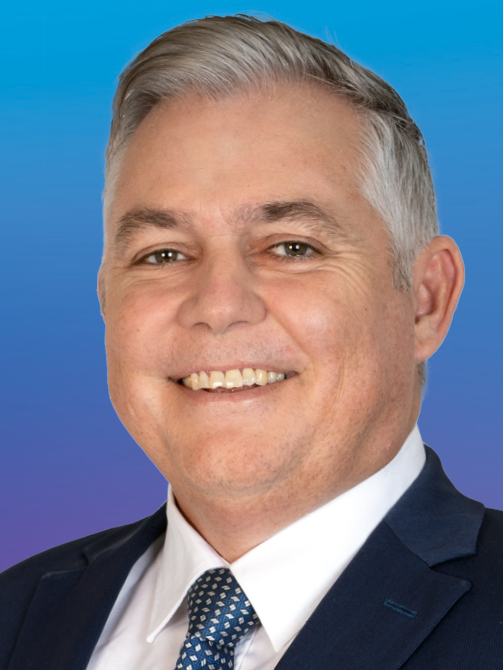
- Mitchell in 2023

43rd Minister of Police
- Incumbent
- Assumed office 27 November 2023
- Prime Minister: Christopher Luxon
- Preceded by: Ginny Andersen

15th Minister of Corrections
- Incumbent
- Assumed office 27 November 2023
- Prime Minister: Christopher Luxon
- Preceded by: Kelvin Davis

29th Minister for Emergency Management
- Incumbent
- Assumed office 27 November 2023
- Prime Minister: Christopher Luxon
- Preceded by: Kieran McAnulty

10th Minister for Ethnic Communities
- Incumbent
- Assumed office 24 January 2025
- Prime Minister: Christopher Luxon
- Preceded by: Melissa Lee

13th Minister for Sport and Recreation
- Incumbent
- Assumed office 24 January 2025
- Prime Minister: Christopher Luxon
- Preceded by: Chris Bishop

39th Minister of Defence
- In office 2 May 2017 – 26 October 2017
- Prime Minister: Bill English
- Preceded by: Gerry Brownlee
- Succeeded by: Ron Mark

15th Minister for Land Information
- In office 20 December 2016 – 26 October 2017
- Prime Minister: Bill English
- Preceded by: Louise Upston
- Succeeded by: Eugenie Sage

28th Minister of Statistics
- In office 20 December 2016 – 2 May 2017
- Prime Minister: Bill English
- Preceded by: Craig Foss
- Succeeded by: Scott Simpson

Member of the New Zealand Parliament for Whangaparāoa (2020–present), Rodney (2011–2020)
- Incumbent
- Assumed office 26 November 2011
- Preceded by: Lockwood Smith
- Majority: 23,376

Personal details
- Born: 22 May 1968 (age 58) Auckland
- Party: National Party
- Relations: Frank Gill (grandfather)
- Website: markmitchell.co.nz

Mark Patrick Mitchell (born 22 May 1968) is a New Zealand politician, former police officer and security contractor, and a member of the New Zealand House of Representatives since 2011. He is a member of the centre-right National Party.

== Early life and career ==
Mitchell was born on Auckland's North Shore and lived his early years at Whenuapai air base, where his father was a flight lieutenant flying Orion aircraft and his mother's father, Air Commodore Frank Gill, was the base commander. Gill was later a National Party cabinet minister, between 1975 and 1980. Mitchell attended Rosmini College, a Catholic school. He dropped out at age 15 and started work as a farm hand.

He joined the New Zealand Police at age 21 and served for thirteen years, working as a dog handler and in the Armed Offenders Squad. In 1997 he was accused of an assault in custody on a gang member, but cleared by the Police Complaints Authority. During the 1990s, Mitchell sustained damage to his lungs after rescuing the residents of a burning house during an arson attempt. He later sustained serious facial injuries during a confrontation with members of the Mongrel Mob gang in Gisborne. As a result of the incident, Mitchell underwent maxillofacial surgery at Waikato Hospital to rebuild his eye socket and repair nerve damage. Mitchell also sustained damage to his elbow while attempting to apprehend a suspect armed with a samurai sword in Rotorua, resulting in long-lasting nerve damage. After leaving the police, Mitchell undertook an executive education short course at Wharton Business School.

Mitchell went to Iraq in 2003 to work for British kidnap and ransom risk-management company Control Risks, providing security to officials of the Coalition Provisional Authority government. He and his men were besieged in the Italian-run An Nasiriyah compound in southern Iraq by the Mahdi militia for five days in 2004. He spent a period training Iraqi security forces in 2004, before leaving Iraq. He has refused to confirm whether he killed anyone in conflict, instead saying there were "casualties on both sides". While working in Iraq, Mitchell survived three vehicular explosions involved improvised explosive devices.

He then spent six years based in Kuwait. He went to work for Kuwait firm Agility Logistics, which was supplying food to military forces in Iraq. The company set up subsidiary Threat Management Group, with Mitchell as CEO and shareholder, to improve security for its logistics staff. The company took on contracts protecting infrastructure and Mitchell dealt with kidnap and ransom negotiations in Iraq, Afghanistan, Somalia and Darfur. He sold Threat Management Group in 2010, when it had an annual turnover of $130 million, and the sale made him wealthy.

== Member of Parliament ==
New Zealand Parliament
Years	Term	Electorate	List	Party
2011–2014	50th	Rodney	59	National
2014–2017	51st	Rodney	42	National
2017–2020	52nd	Rodney	21	National
2020–2023	53rd	Whangaparāoa	15	National
2023–2026	54th	Whangaparāoa	11	National
2026–present	55th	Whangaparāoa	8	National

=== In Government, 2011–2017 ===
When National MP for Rodney and Speaker of the New Zealand House of Representatives Lockwood Smith decided to contest the 2011 New Zealand general election as a list only candidate, Mitchell was a candidate to replace him in Rodney and officially won the National Party pre-selection contest for the seat on 26 April 2011. Mitchell won the seat with over 53% of the vote, defeating his nearest rival, Conservative Party founder and leader Colin Craig by over 12,000 votes.

Mitchell voted against the Marriage (Definition of Marriage) Amendment Bill, a bill allowing same-sex couples to marry in New Zealand.

In 2014, Nicky Hager's book Dirty Politics presented evidence that suggested that Mitchell had hired political strategist Simon Lusk during the National Party selection process for the Rodney electorate. Lusk appeared to have collaborated with blogger Cameron Slater to discredit Mitchell's opponents, particularly Brent Robinson. Mitchell strongly denies ever paying Lusk or Slater, but admitted Lusk had given him guidance on speeches and brochures.

He served as Chairperson of the Foreign Affairs, Defence and Trade Committee from the 2014 general election. When John Key resigned as Prime Minister and Bill English replaced him in 2016, Mitchell was appointed as Minister for Land Information and Minister of Statistics outside of cabinet by the new Prime Minister. When English reshuffled his cabinet in 2017, Mitchell was considered one of the "big winners" in the reshuffle, being promoted into cabinet and being made Minister of Defence, replacing Gerry Brownlee who was moved into the role of Minister of Foreign Affairs. In the reshuffle Mitchell kept the Land Information portfolio while being replaced in the Statistics portfolio by Scott Simpson.

=== In opposition, 2017–2023 ===
During the 2017 general election, Mark Mitchell was re-elected in the Rodney electorate, defeating Labour candidate Marja Lubeck by a margin of 19,561 votes. Following the formation of a Labour-led coalition government, Mitchell was appointed as National's Spokesperson for the defence, disarmament, and justice portfolios. On 22 January 2019, he was designated as National's Spokesperson for Pike River Re-entry.

On 10 June 2019, Mitchell voiced concerns about the Labour-led coalition government's plan to withdraw New Zealand's non-combat training mission from Iraq by June 2020, stating it was too soon. The following day, Mitchell supported the Government's NZ$20 billion Defence Capability Plan to boost the New Zealand Defence Force's equipment and manpower but disagreed with the Government's decision to bypass the tender process for new Lockheed C-130 Hercules aircraft.

Following the resignation of short-lived National party leader Todd Muller on 14 July 2020, Mitchell ran unsuccessfully against fellow MP Judith Collins for the position of Leader of the National Party. During the 2020 general election, Mitchell won the seat of Whangaparāoa (which had replaced his previous electorate of Rodney) by a final margin of 7,823 votes. Following the election, Mitchell ruled out challenging party leader Collins in the wake of National's landslide defeat.

=== In Government, 2023–present ===
During the 2023 New Zealand general election, Mitchell was re-elected in Whangaparāoa by a margin of 23,376, defeating Labour's candidate Estefania Muller Pallarès. Following the formation of the National-led coalition government in late November 2023, Mitchell was appointed as Minister of Corrections, Minister for Emergency Management and Recovery, and Minister of Police. As a senior cabinet minister, Mitchell represented New Zealand at the Summit on Peace in Ukraine at Bürgenstock Resort in Switzerland on 15–16 June 2024. Following a cabinet reshuffle on 19 January 2025, Mitchell acquired the ethnic communities ministerial portfolio.

==== Views on law and order ====
Mark Mitchell believes that the majority of those sentenced to prison have committed violent or sexual offending and advocates for an even tougher approach to crime. He is considering scrapping short prison sentences in favour of longer ones as prisoners on long sentences—according to his beliefs—are able to attend rehabilitation and therefore re-offend less frequently on release. He has repeatedly emphasised that his government is "putting victims first, ahead of offenders." He would rather see a massive increase in the prison population than put less serious offenders into halfway homes where they could be rehabilitated.

==== Minister of Police ====
On 8 December 2023 Mitchell as Police Minister met with Police Commissioner Andrew Coster to set out the Government's expectations for Police and combating gangs. Coster agreed to the Minister's expectations, but resigned a few months later to lead the Social Investment Agency.

==== 500 new police officers ====
In the 2024 the Government announced funding to recruit and train an extra 500 police officers by the end of 2025 "to improve public safety". A new training facility was established in Auckland. However by April 2025, it became clear this goal would not be met and the target date was pushed out to June 2026.

==== Gang insignia ====
On 25 February 2024, Mitchell and Justice Minister Paul Goldsmith announced that the Government would introduce legislation to ban gang insignia in public places, enable Police to disperse gang gatherings, allow Courts to ban gang members from communicating for at least three years, and giving greater weight to gang membership during sentencing. Mitchell also confirmed the ban on gang insignia would apply to funerals and tangi. During the press conference, Mitchell said "For too long gangs have been allowed to behave as if they are above the law. There is no tolerance for this behaviour and these new laws will support Police to take action against it". The Gangs Act 2024 passed into law on 19 September 2024.

On 7 June, Mitchell confirmed that the Government would halt funding for the Mongrel Mob's controversial drug rehabilitation programme Kahukura, which had been supported by the previous Labour Government.

==== Boot camps ====
Despite national and international evidence that boot camps do not reduce offending, and may exacerbate previous childhood trauma, the National-led coalition government set up boot camps for young offenders again in 2024. In 2023, Mitchell said that these military academies would be modelled after the New Zealand Defence Force's six-week Limited Service Volunteer programme. Youth offenders would take courses in numeracy, team-building, literacy and physical activities. He said that the Academies would last for one year and would be based at several military bases including Trentham Military Camp in Upper Hutt, Whenuapai's RNZAF Base Auckland, and Burnham Military Camp near Christchurch. In response to criticism, Mitchell argued that boot camps were necessary because serious youth offenders were a "danger to the community...and themselves."

==== Minister of Corrections ====
On 6 May 2024, Mitchell and Prime Minister Christopher Luxon announced that the Government would allocate NZ$1.9 billion from the upcoming 2024 New Zealand budget to training 470 new corrections officers and adding 810 beds to Waikeria Prison.

Corrections Amendment Act 2024

In June 2024, Mitchell was responsible of ushering through the Corrections Amendment Act 2024. The Act broadened the definition of 'rehabilition programme' to include medical, social, therapeutic, psychological, te ao Māori, cultural, educational, employment-related, and religion-based programmes and allows prisoners on remand to access offence-based rehabilitation programmes for the first time. Treaty of Waitangi provisions which were contained in the original version of Bill proposed by the previous Labour government were removed.

Proposal to abolish short prison sentences

In May 2025, Mitchell suggested that short prison sentences (two years or less) should be replaced by longer sentences because only prisoners on longer sentences (more than two years) reoffended at a lower rate. He suggested this was because only those on long sentences are able to attend rehabilitation programmes in prison. Labour and the Greens pointed out that this would lead to a massive increase in prison numbers, requiring more and more prisons which are prohibitively expensive to build. Criminology lecturer, Dr Ronald Kramer pointed out that prison based rehabilition is ineffective and that those on long sentences reoffend less because they "age out" of criminal behaviour.

==== Minister of Emergency Management ====
On 4 October 2024, Mitchell visited Dunedin in response to the 2024 Otago floods to support the emergency relief efforts of local authorities and volunteers. He also reiterated the central government's willingness to assist flood-affected communities in Dunedin. On 7 October, Mitchell confirmed during a press conference with local and central government leaders that the central government was working on a national buyout blueprint for homeowners whose properties were affected by extreme weather events.

On 1 May 2025, Mitchell as Emergency Management Minister declared a state of emergency in Christchurch in response to heavy rain and widespread flooding in the city and surrounding Selwyn District.

==== Minister for Sport and Recreation ====
In late July 2025, Mitchell ordered the national sporting body Sport New Zealand to scrap its transgender inclusive sports guidelines. The anti-transgender group Save Women's Sport Australasia had previously lobbied his predecessor Chris Bishop and New Zealand First leader Winston Peters into scrapping the guidelines. Labour's rainbow issues spokesperson Shanan Halbert described the scrapping of the transgender inclusive guidelines as a "step backwards" while the Greens' rainbow issues spokesperson Benjamin Doyle said that the Government had failed rainbow communities.

==== 2026 general election ====
During the 2026 New Zealand general election, Mitchell contested the Whangaparāoa electorate for National. He was ranked eighth on the National Party list. On 7 November, Mitchell retained Whangaparāoa by a landslide margin of 15,368 votes.

== Personal life ==
Mitchell had a brother who suffered from mental health problems and committed suicide. In 2011, he married Peggy Bourne, the widow of rally driver Possum Bourne. She was his third wife. However, the marriage didn't last and as of 2021, Mitchell has been in a new relationship. In 2026, he married his fourth wife, Sarah Mattson. He has two biological children and is step-father to Peggy Bourne's three children to Possum Bourne.

Mitchell has owned several dogs including his former police dog "Czar." He also owned a livestyle block in Taupo. Mitchell also does spear-fishing as a recreational pastime.

New Zealand Parliament
Preceded by Lockwood Smith	Member of Parliament for Rodney; 2011–2020	Constituency abolished
New constituency	Member of Parliament for Whangaparāoa; 2020–present	Incumbent
Political offices
Preceded by Louise Upston	Minister for Land Information; 2016–2017	Succeeded by Eugenie Sage
