= Office of Treaty Settlements =

New Zealand government agency

The Office of Treaty Settlements (in Māori: Te Tari Whakatau Take e pa ana ki te Tiriti o Waitangi) was an office within the New Zealand Ministry of Justice tasked with negotiating settlements due to historical breaches of the Treaty of Waitangi. It reported and provided advice on policy and negotiations to the Minister of Treaty of Waitangi Negotiations.

The office's functions were incorporated into the new departmental agency Te Arawhiti in 2019 and as of 2025 sit within Te Tari Whakatau, the Office of Treaty Settlements and Takutai Moana.

== Mandate and functions ==
The functions of the organisation were to:

- Advise the government on generic Treaty issues, including overall strategies for settling historical Treaty claims;
- Advise and assist claimant groups to ensure well-mandated, large natural groups of claimants are ready to enter negotiations;
- Negotiate with Māori on behalf of the Crown;
- Implement settlements;
- Ensure that the Crown undertakes research into historical Treaty grievances and has its position represented at Waitangi Tribunal hearings; and
- Advise on the acquisition, management, transfer and disposal of Crown-owned property for Treaty claim purposes.

The Office of Treaty Settlements also administered many of the Treaty of Waitangi Settlement Acts, for a list of these see the list of Treaty settlements.

== History ==
The office was originally formed in 1988, as the Treaty of Waitangi Policy Unit within the-then Department of Justice. It was set up to advise on policy and assist in negotiations and litigation of Māori treaty claims and at the Waitangi Tribunal. It was consolidated with other government units into Te Arawhiti, the Office of Māori Crown Relations, in 2019. Its role is now handled by Te Tari Whakatau, the Office of Treaty Settlements and Takutai Moana.
