= Minister for Land Information =

New Zealand minister of the Crown

Minister for Land Information of New Zealand
- Coat of arms of New Zealand

- Flag of New Zealand

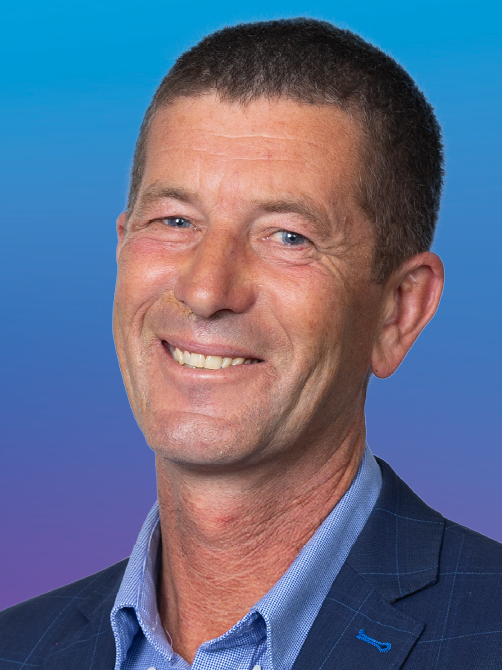
- Incumbent; Mike Butterick since 7 April 2026
- Land Information New Zealand
- Style: The Honourable
- Member of: Cabinet of New Zealand; Executive Council
- Reports to: Prime Minister of New Zealand
- Appointer: Governor-General of New Zealand
- Term length: At His Majesty's pleasure
- Formation: 1 April 1987
- First holder: Koro Wētere
- Salary: $288,900
- Website: www.beehive.govt.nz

The Minister for Land Information is a minister in the New Zealand Government with responsibility for matters relating to land titles, ratings, survey systems, topographical and hydrographical information and Crown Property Management. It was split from the Lands portfolio in 1987.

The current minister is Mike Butterick.

== List of ministers ==
Key

Labour National Alliance Green

No.	Name	Portrait	Term of office		Prime Minister
1	Koro Wētere		1 April 1987	16 September 1987	Lange
2	Peter Tapsell		16 September 1987	2 November 1990	Lange
2	Peter Tapsell		16 September 1987	2 November 1990	Palmer
2	Peter Tapsell		16 September 1987	2 November 1990	Moore
3	Rob Storey		2 November 1990	2 November 1993	Bolger
4	Denis Marshall		2 November 1993	10 December 1996	Bolger
5	John Luxton		10 December 1996	10 December 1999	Bolger
5	John Luxton		10 December 1996	10 December 1999	Shipley
6	Paul Swain		10 December 1999	13 November 2000	Clark
7	Matt Robson		13 November 2000	15 August 2002	Clark
8	John Tamihere		15 August 2002	15 October 2004	Clark
(6)	Paul Swain		15 October 2004	21 December 2004	Clark
9	Pete Hodgson		21 December 2004	3 May 2006	Clark
10	David Parker		3 May 2006	19 November 2008	Clark
11	Richard Worth		19 November 2008	2 June 2009	Key
12	Maurice Williamson		3 June 2009	8 May 2014	Key
13	Michael Woodhouse		8 May 2014	6 October 2014	Key
14	Louise Upston		6 October 2014	20 December 2016	Key
15	Mark Mitchell		20 December 2016	26 October 2017	English
16	Eugenie Sage		26 October 2017	6 November 2020	Ardern
17	Damien O'Connor		6 November 2020	27 November 2023	Ardern
17	Damien O'Connor		6 November 2020	27 November 2023	Hipkins
18	Chris Penk		27 November 2023	7 April 2026	Luxon
19	Mike Butterick		7 April 2026	Incumbent	Luxon
