= Tourism New Zealand =

Destination marketing organisation of New Zealand

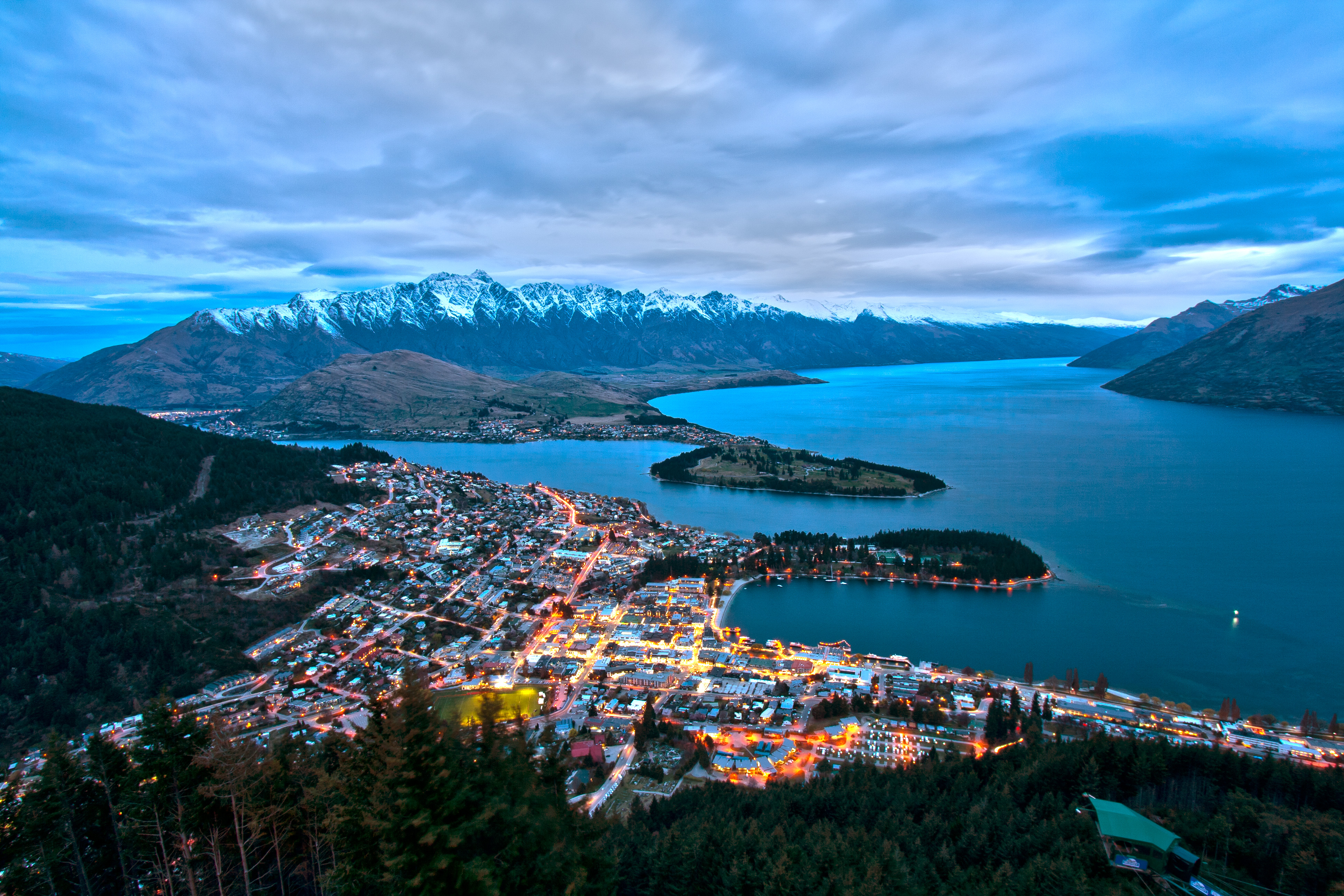
The mountainside resort town of Queenstown

Tourism New Zealand is the marketing agency responsible for promoting New Zealand as a tourism destination internationally. It is the trading name of the New Zealand Tourism Board, a Crown entity established under the New Zealand Tourism Board Act 1991. The Ministry of Business, Innovation and Employment; (previously the New Zealand Ministry of Tourism) is the government department tasked with tourism policy and research.

In undertaking this promotion, it has a stated objective to contribute to New Zealand's well-being across four pillars: the Economy, Nature, Culture, and Society.

== History ==
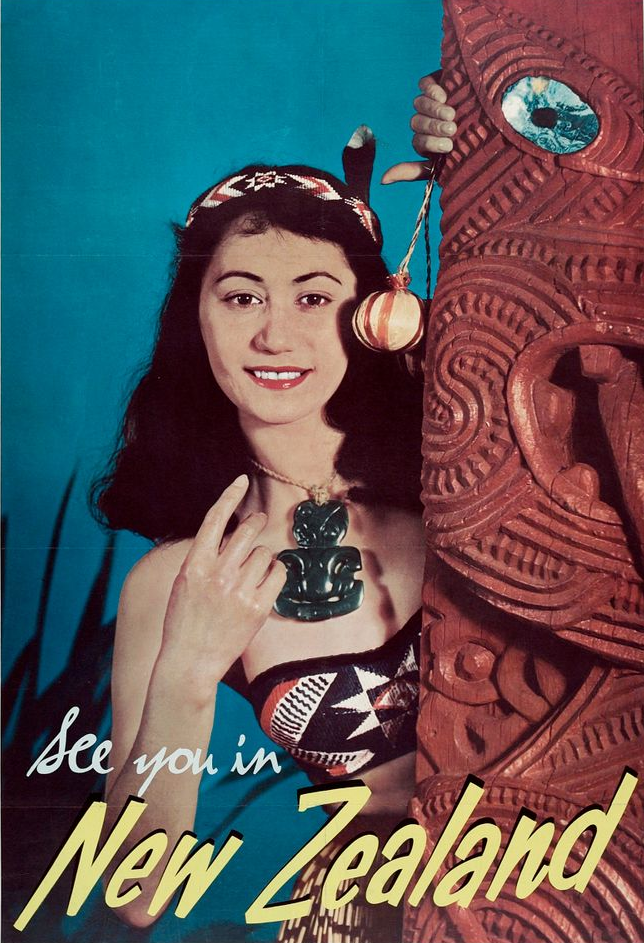
A New Zealand tourism poster from the 1960s

New Zealand was the first country to dedicate a government department to tourism. In 1901, the Department of Tourist and Health Resorts came into being. Through most of the 20th century, its role was tactical - running hotels and putting together itineraries around New Zealand as well as advertising.

The organisation now known as Tourism New Zealand focuses on marketing New Zealand. International tourism has grown to become New Zealand's largest earner of foreign exchange, pumping around NZD14.5 billion annually into the nation's economy. Over 3.4 million visitors arrive in the country every year.

To achieve the best results Tourism New Zealand focuses marketing activity in core markets. The largest number of international visitors to New Zealand arrive from Australia, China and the USA.

In October 2017 Lonely Planet named New Zealand in the Top 10 countries to visit in 2018.

Prior to the Covid-19 Pandemic tourism was New Zealand's single largest export industry, adding approximately 40.9 billion dollars to the economy and directly employing approximately 8.4% of New Zealand's total workforce.

== Leadership ==
As a Crown Entity, Tourism New Zealand is governed by a board chaired by Jamie Tuuta, who work alongside an executive team led by Chief Executive René de Monchy to promote New Zealand in key markets as a visitor destination. As part of the wider Tourism sector which includes the Ministry of Business, Innovation and Employment as well as numerous Regional Tourism Organisations their priorities are set by the Minister of Tourism, Louise Upston.

== "100% Pure New Zealand" ==
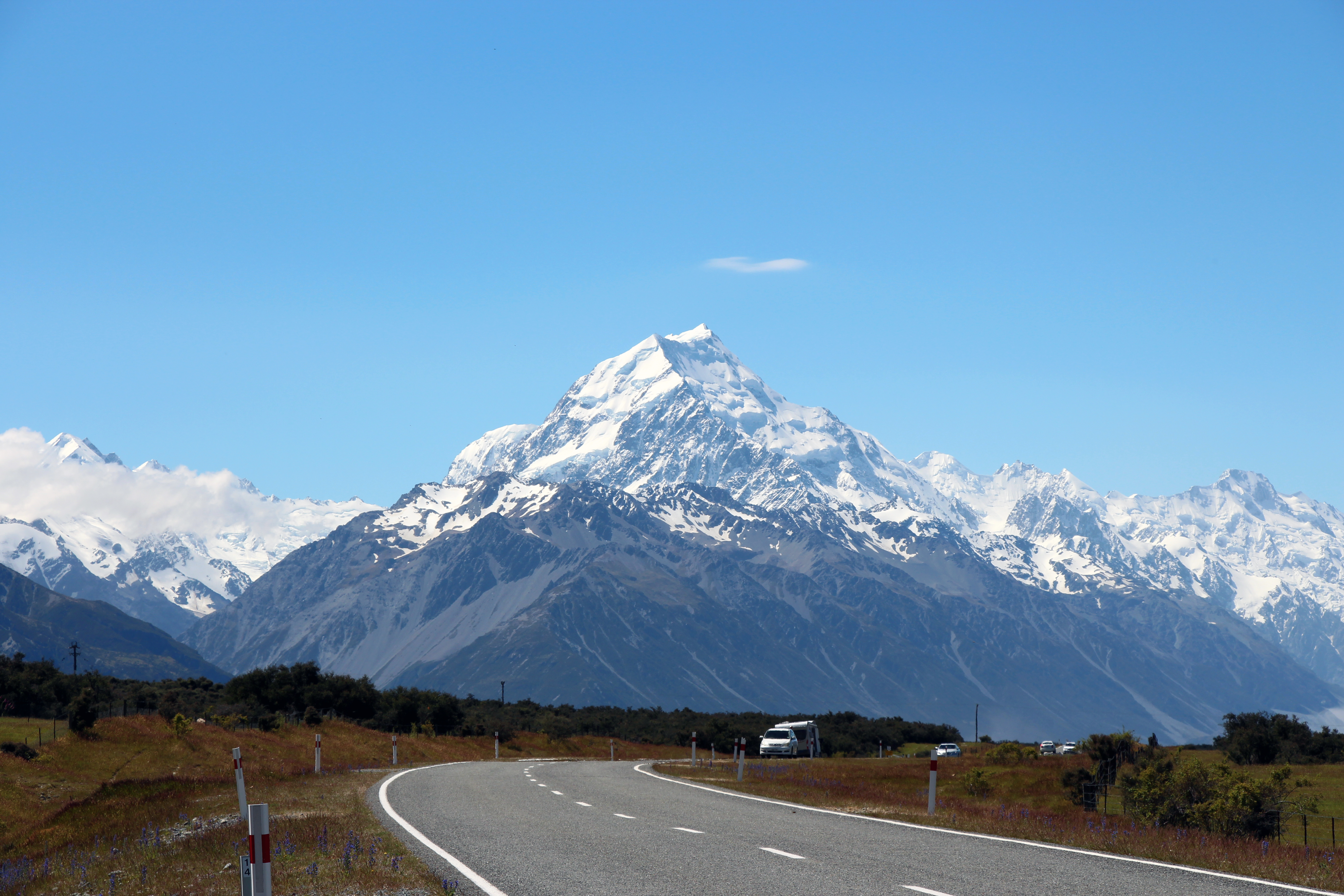
Aoraki / Mount Cook

The main marketing tool of Tourism New Zealand is the award-winning "100% Pure New Zealand" campaign, which had its ten-year anniversary in 2009.

The brand has attracted debate at times from scientists such as Mike Joy, environmentalists, and the Green Party who see the 100% Pure brand as an environmental statement.

Tourism New Zealand markets New Zealand using the 100% Pure New Zealand marketing campaign.

=== Social media ===
Tourism New Zealand set up a YouTube channel in 2007 to launch the latest iteration of its 100% Pure New Zealand campaign It has featured the theme of New Zealand being the 'Youngest Country' in the world - the last major habitable landmass to be discovered.

Tourism New Zealand also has an Instagram account. Its #NZMustDo hashtag has attracted over 500,000 images and has over 600,000 followers. All content is user generated.

== i-SITE ==
The i-SITE Network is a nationwide network of visitor information centres in New Zealand, established by Tourism New Zealand in 1990. Prior to 1990, some New Zealand tourism sites and places operated independent information and publicity centres. As of 2024, there are over 60 i-SITE centres across New Zealand, which provide tourism-oriented information, accommodation and transport bookings, and activity reservations for visitors.

The management, administration and marketing of i-SITE New Zealand is primarily funded by Tourism New Zealand, however the day-to-day running of individual centres is funded by booking fees, retail sales, and support from local government. While the brand is managed by Tourism New Zealand, each i-SITE is individually owned and operated.

== See also ==
- Tourism in New Zealand
