= Mike Butterick =

New Zealand politician

The Honourable Mike Butterick MP
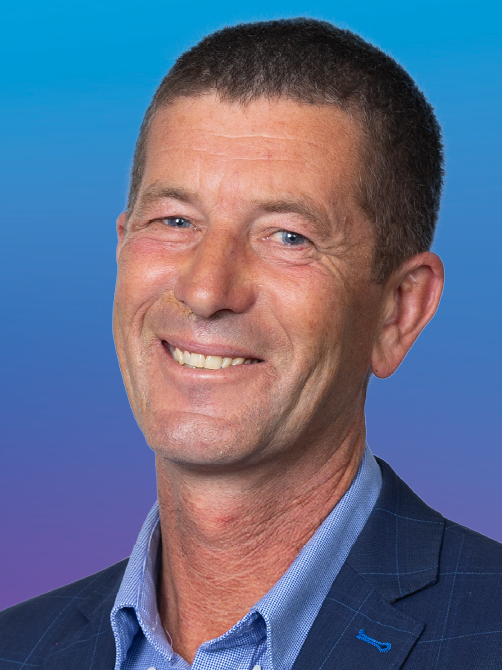
- Butterick in 2023

19th Minister for Land Information
- Incumbent
- Assumed office 7 April 2026
- Prime Minister: Christopher Luxon
- Preceded by: Chris Penk

Member of the New Zealand Parliament for Wairarapa
- Incumbent
- Assumed office 14 October 2023
- Preceded by: Kieran McAnulty

Personal details
- Born: Michael David Butterick; 1971 or 1972 (age 54–55)
- Party: National
- Spouse: Rachel
- Children: 4
- Profession: Farmer

Michael David Butterick (born 1971 or 1972) is a New Zealand farmer and politician. He was elected as a Member of the New Zealand House of Representatives for Wairarapa, representing the National Party, in the 2023 New Zealand general election. In April 2026, Butterick became Minister for Land Information and associate Minister of Agriculture.

== Early life and career ==
Butterick grew up in mid-Canterbury, and began his agricultural career as a shepherd in Canterbury. He moved to the Wairarapa region in 1990 and bought a property there in 1995, where he farms sheep and beef. He is the Meat and Wool Chair of the Wairarapa branch of Federated Farmers, and is also a director of Wings over Wairarapa. Butterick has been a spokesperson for the rural lobby group Fifty Shades of Green, which campaigns against the conversion of sheep farms to forestry. He says the group are concerned about the social, environmental and economic effects on rural communities of increased forestry. Butterick tried to convert a farm he owned in Te Wharau to a national park, but when that failed and it did not sell as a farm, he sold it to a forestry company.

== Political career ==
New Zealand Parliament
Years	Term	Electorate	List	Party
2023–present	54th	Wairarapa	61	National

Butterick was selected as the National Party candidate for the Wairarapa electorate in May 2020, following incumbent MP Alastair Scott's decision to retire. He got 34.42% of the vote and was defeated by Kieran McAnulty. Ranked 58th on National's list in 2020, he did not enter Parliament.

On 18 March 2023, Butterick was selected to contest Wairarapa again for the 2023 election. He was placed in 61st position on the 2023 party list. On election night he defeated incumbent McAnulty by a margin of 2,816 votes.

Following a cabinet reshuffle in early April 2026, Butterick became the Minister for Land Information and the associate Minister of Agriculture.

In early June 2026, Butterick attracted media attention after he distributed swag bags containing National Party merchandise including stationery, notebooks, lunchboxes and mints at several schools in his Wairarapa electorate. Several parents complained to the Ministry of Education that Butterick was engaged in electoral campaigning on school grounds. The Ministry subsequently clarified that schools could support learning about politics but could not engage in political promotion and electoral campaigning on school grounds. In response, Butterick denied he was campaigning and said he had received approval from the Speaker of the New Zealand House of Representatives. He said that the merchandise served as a way for providing his contact details to constituents through students and their families.

During the 2026 New Zealand general election scheduled for 7 November, Butterick stood as National's candidate in the Wairarapa electorate. He was ranked 19th on the National Party list. On 7 November, Butterick came first in the Wairarapa contest, gaining 17,943 votes based on preliminary results. He had a narrow marginal lead of 139 votes over his Labour opponent McAnulty.

== Personal life ==
Butterick is married to Rachel, with whom he has a son and three daughters.

New Zealand Parliament
Preceded by Kieran McAnulty	Member of Parliament for Wairarapa; 2023–present	Incumbent
