= Corrections Association of New Zealand =

Trade union in New Zealand

CANZ
- Corrections Association of New Zealand
- Founded: 1999
- Headquarters: Napier, New Zealand
- Location: New Zealand
- Members: 4880
- Key people: President Floyd du Plessis Vice President Mike Woodland Treasurer Cliff Hughes Secretary Paul Dennehy
- Affiliations: CPSU, POVB and POAA
- Website: www.canzunion.co.nz

The Corrections Association of New Zealand (CANZ) is a national trade union in New Zealand. It represents corrections staff within the New Zealand prison system run by the Department of Corrections and Serco. It has a membership of 5300. It is run by prison-based corrections staff for corrections staff. It is the largest prisons based union in New Zealand.

CANZ is not a member of the NZCTU but aligned with the Prison Officers Vocational Branch (POVB) of the CPSU in Australia.
