= Israel Gottlieb Canz =

German Protestant theologian (1690–1753)

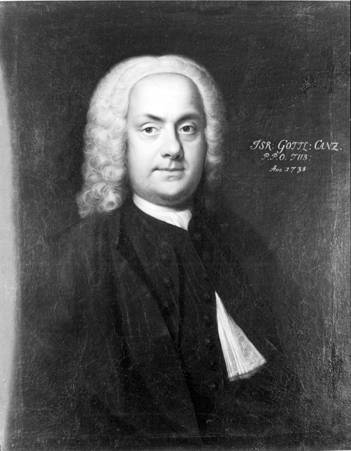
- Portrait of Canz by Wolfgang Dietrich Majer at Tübingen, 1738
- Born: 26 February 1690; Grünthal
- Died: 28 January 1753 (aged 62); Tübingen
- Education: University of Tübingen
- Occupations: Theologian, Philosopher, Professor
- Theological work
- Tradition or movement: Protestantism
- Main interests: Theology, Philosophy
- Notable ideas: Commentary on the philosophy of Wolf, Application of philosophy to revealed theology, New approach to moral theology

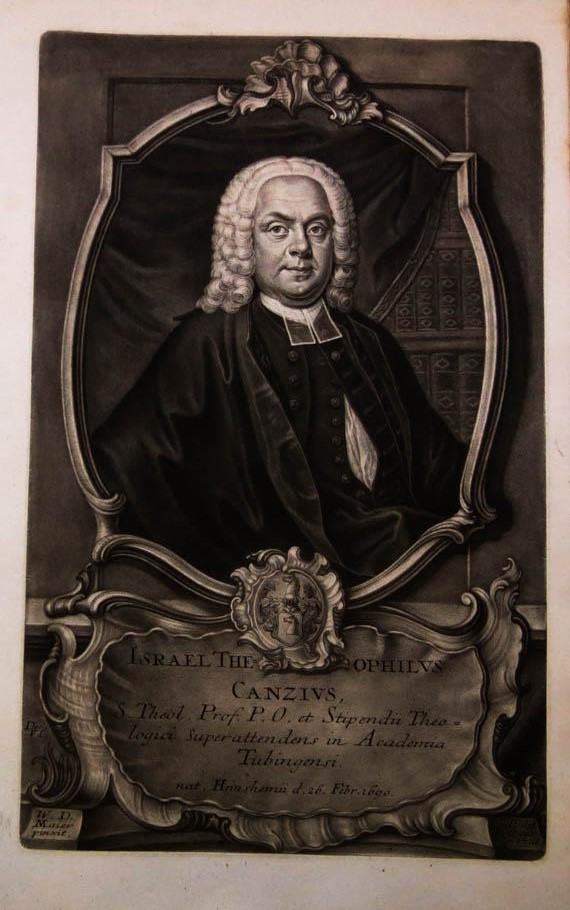
Mezzotint by Johann Jacob Haid after the portrait above, 1744

Israel Gottlieb Canz (26 February 1690 – 28 January 1753) was a Protestant theologian and philosopher of Germany.

== Life ==
Israel Gottlieb Canz was born on 26 February 1690, at Grünthal. He studied at Tübingen, and took, in 1709, the degree of doctor of philosophy. In 1720 he was deacon at Nürtingen, and was, in 1734, appointed professor of elocution at Tübingen. In 1739 he was made professor of logic and metaphysics, and in 1747 professor of theology. He died there, on 28 January 1753, at the age of 62.

== Works ==
From the first a decided opponent of the philosophy of Wolf, he had already prepared a large volume in refutation of it, when he perceived that he had passed an unfair judgment upon it. The book, which appeared later, was in effect an eloquent commentary upon that system, which he developed in connection with his colleague Bilfinger. Then he applied this philosophy to revealed theology. In moral theology he introduced a new choice of material, and especially new points of view. He wrote, among other works,

- Philosophiæ Leibnitianæ et Wolfianæ usus in Theologia (1728);
- Positiones de Vocatione Ministrorum Ecclesiæ (1729);
- Diss. de Nexu Providentiæ Divinæ cum Litterarum Studio (1739);
- Theologia Thetico-polemica (Dresden, 1741);
- De jure Dei in res Creatas (1742);
- Oraculum 2 Samuel xxiii, 5 (1749);
- Explicatio Oraculi Psa. viii, 3 (1750);
- Compendium Theologiæ Purioris (1752, 3rd ed. 1761);
- Annotationes ad Compendium (1755).

== Sources ==
- Richter, Arthur (1876). "Canz, Israel Gottlieb". In Allgemeine Deutsche Biographie (ADB). Vol. 3. Leipzig: Duncker & Humblot. pp. 768–769.
- Wolfes, Matthias (2001). "Canz, Israel Gottlieb". In Biographisch-Bibliographisches Kirchenlexikon (BBKL). Vol. 18. Herzberg: Bautz. ISBN 3-88309-086-7. pp. 243–256.

Attribution:

- Pick, B. (1885). "Canz, Israel Gottlieb". In McClintock, John; Strong, James (eds.). Cyclopædia of Biblical, Theological and Ecclesiastical Literature. Supplement.—Vol. 1. New York: Harper & Brothers. p. 781.
