= Minister of Corrections (New Zealand) =

New Zealand minister of the Crown

- Coat of arms of New Zealand

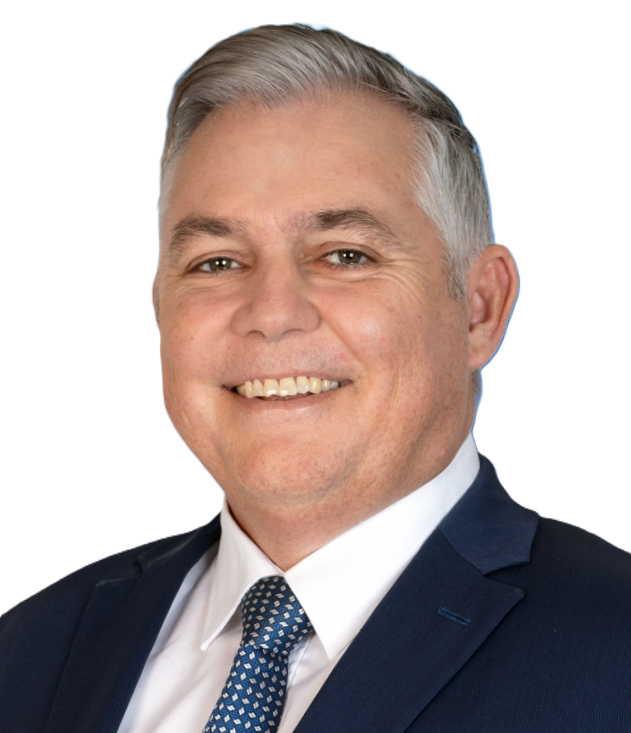
- Incumbent; Mark Mitchell since 27 November 2023
- Department of Corrections
- Style: The Honourable
- Member of: Cabinet of New Zealand; Executive Council
- Reports to: Prime Minister of New Zealand
- Appointer: Governor-General of New Zealand
- Term length: At His Majesty's pleasure
- Formation: 1995
- First holder: Doug Graham
- Salary: $288,900
- Website: www.beehive.govt.nz

The Minister of Corrections in a minister in the New Zealand Government appointed by the Prime Minister to be in charge of the Department of Corrections. The current Minister of Corrections is Mark Mitchell.

== History ==
Prior to 1995 the country's prisons, probation system and the courts were all managed by the Department of Justice and overseen by the Minister of Justice. The Department of Corrections was formed in 1995 by the Department of Justice (Restructuring) Act 1995. A separate ministerial portfolio for corrections was created on 1 October 1995 and was initially assigned to the incumbent justice minister, Doug Graham.

== Responsibilities ==
The Minister of Corrections is responsible for determining policy and exercising statutory powers and functions related to the Corrections portfolio. The Minister is also responsible to Parliament for ensuring the Department of Corrections carries out its functions properly and efficiently.

Legislation related to the Corrections portfolio includes the Corrections Act 2004 (and accompanying regulations in the Corrections Regulations 2005), the Criminal Justice Act 1985, the Parole Act 2002, and the Sentencing Act 2002.

The Minister of Corrections is also responsible for:

- Giving general directions to the Chief Executive of the Department relating to the exercise of their powers and functions.
- Any other powers and functions conferred under the Corrections Act 2004 or regulations made under it.
- Setting pay rates for part-time probation officers.
- Declaring land or buildings to be a prison or community work centre.
- Requisitioning land and buildings in an emergency.
- Approving pay rates for working prisoners.
- Setting the cost of imprisonment so it can be deducted from the earnings of prisoners on "release to work".
- Consenting to the Chief Executive contracting out escort and courtroom custodial services.

== List of ministers ==
The following ministers have held the office of Minister of Corrections.

Key

Labour National Alliance

| No. | Name | Portrait | Term of Office | | Prime Minister |
|---|---|---|---|---|---|
| 1 | Doug Graham | | 1 October 1995 | 1 March 1996 | Bolger |
| 2 | Paul East | | 1 March 1996 | 8 December 1997 | Bolger |
| 3 | Nick Smith | | 8 December 1997 | 1 February 1999 | Shipley |
| 4 | Clem Simich | | 1 February 1999 | 10 December 1999 | Shipley |
| 5 | Matt Robson | | 10 December 1999 | 15 August 2002 | Clark |
| 6 | Mark Gosche | | 15 August 2002 | 19 May 2003 | Clark |
| 7 | Paul Swain | | 19 May 2003 | 19 October 2005 | Clark |
| 8 | Damien O'Connor | | 19 October 2005 | 2 November 2007 | Clark |
| 9 | Phil Goff | | 5 November 2007 | 19 November 2008 | Clark |
| 10 | Judith Collins | | 19 November 2008 | 12 December 2011 | Key |
| 11 | Anne Tolley | | 12 December 2011 | 8 October 2014 | Key |
| 12 | Sam Lotu-Iiga | | 8 October 2014 | 14 December 2015 | Key |
| (10) | Judith Collins | | 14 December 2015 | 20 December 2016 | Key |
| 13 | Louise Upston | | 20 December 2016 | 26 October 2017 | English |
| 14 | Kelvin Davis | | 26 October 2017 | 27 November 2023 | Ardern |
| 14 | Kelvin Davis | | 26 October 2017 | 27 November 2023 | Hipkins |
| 15 | Mark Mitchell | | 27 November 2023 | present | Luxon |
