= Daffen =

Daffen is a surname. Notable people with the surname include:

- Arthur Daffen (1861–1938), English cricketer
- Harold Daffen (1899–1984), Australian politician
