= Offler =

Offler is a surname. It can refer to:

== People ==
- H. S. Offler, English historian and editor
- William H. Offler, owner of Crystal Pool (Seattle) since 1944
- Constance Williamina Offler, winner of the Australian 2002 Queen's Birthday Honours Medal for service to visual arts and the promotion of art in society
- Pte. J. W. Offler, Royal Sussex Regiment, awarded 1916 Birthday Honours medal by King George V

== Literature ==
- A crocodile-headed deity of Klatch, a continent from Terry Pratchett's Discworld series of novels
