= Gunew =

Gunew is a surname. Notable people with the surname include:

- Georgia Gunew (born 2003), Australian para skier
- Sneja Gunew (1946–2024), Australian-Canadian literary theorist
