= Robert Connell =

Robert Connell may refer to:

- Raewyn Connell (born 1944), Australian sociologist
- Robert Connell (politician) (1871–1957), Scottish-Canadian Anglican priest and politician in British Columbia
- Robert Lowden Connell (1867–1936), British shipowner and politician
- Robert Connell (police commissioner) (1867–1956), commissioner of police for the state of Western Australia
