= Harold Daffen =

Australian politician

Harold Arthur Charles Daffen (8 September 1899 – 15 August 1984) was an Australian politician. He was a Liberal Party of Australia member of the Western Australian Legislative Council from 1947 to 1950, representing Central Province.

Daffen was born in Brunswick, Victoria, the son of Arthur Daffen, a school teacher who had recently emigrated from England; his family moved to South Australia in 1900 and Western Australia in 1902. He was educated at St Joachim's Convent School in Victoria Park and St Patrick's Boys School, but left school early to work on his family's farm at Kukerin and later for D. & J. Fowler Ltd. He enlisted for military service on 6 October 1917, and was an orderly in the dental corps of the Royal Australian Army Medical Corps and attended non-commissioned officer training before embarking overseas on 29 October 1918; however, with the end of the war on 11 November he was reported as returning home in December. He was discharged on 17 January 1919, re-enlisted with the Home Service Corps the next day, and worked in the military headquarters in Perth until 1920, having made sergeant in June 1919.

Daffen returned to Kukerin in 1920 under the repatriation scheme and began farming wheat and sheep in partnership with his brother; he served as president of the Kukerin branch of the Wheatgrowers' Union during this time. He withdrew from the partnership in 1932, returned to Perth and worked as a branch manager for Bruce Small Pty Ltd. Daffen then moved to Geraldton in 1936, where he worked for Young Motors Limited as manager of their radio and sports department until his election to parliament. He was a councillor of the Municipality of Geraldton from 1943 to 1947, captain of the Utakarra Golf Club at Geraldton from 1936 to 1940, trustee and honorary secretary of the Geraldton Sailors and Soldiers Memorial Institute from 1942 to 1950 and deputy controller of air raid precautions at Geraldton during World War II. He was an unsuccessful Liberal candidate for the Legislative Assembly at the 1947 state election.

Daffen was elected to the Legislative Council at a by-election on 30 August 1947 caused by the death of John Drew. He was a member of the Joint Select Committee on the Bush Fires Act Amendment Bill in 1948. He ran for re-election in 1950 (his seat having been renamed Midland Province) on a platform including new water supply schemes and attempts to combat soil erosion and soil salinity, but was defeated by Country Party candidate Ray Jones. Daffen had won majorities in the Geraldton and Greenough areas, but was narrowly beaten due to his opponent's victory margins in more rural areas.

Daffen moved back to Perth in June 1950 following his defeat; he later operated a store in North Perth and worked for a succession of companies. He was also a member of the Bayswater Road Board from 1955 to 1958. He died in 1984 at a Mount Lawley nursing home and was buried at Karrakatta Cemetery.

He married Evelyn Janet Sibbella Hooton on 18 April 1936; they had three sons.
