= List of commissioners of the Western Australia Police Force =

The Western Australian Police Commissioner is the head of the Western Australia Police Force. The rank of Commissioner was formalised in 1887; prior to then the rank of Superintendent was more commonly used.

Western Australia Police commissioners
Term	Name	References
1853–1856	John Augustus Conroy	
1856–1857	Frederick Palgrave Barlee	
1857	William Hogan	
1857–1858	Alfred Hawes Stone	
1858	Charles Symmons	
1858–1860	Alexander Thomas Cockburn-Campbell	
1861–1866	William Hogan	
1866–1867	Robert Henry Crampton	
1867–1871	Gustavus Edward Cockburn Hare	
1871	William Henry Timperley	
1871–1887	Matthew Skinner Smith	
1887–1900	George Braithwaite Phillips	
1900	William Chipper Lawrence	
1900–1912	Frederick Arthur Hare	
1912–1933	Robert Connell	
1933–1934	William Douglas	
1934–1945	David Hunter	
1945–1951	John Doyle	
1951–1958	Thomas Herman Andersen	
1958–1965	James O'Brien	
1965–1971	Richard Napier	
1971–1975	Athol Wedd	
1975–1981	Owen Leitch	
1981–1985	John Porter	
1985–1994	Brian Bull	
1994–1999	Robert (Bob) Falconer	
1999–2004	Barry Matthews	
2004–2017	Karl O'Callaghan	
2017–2022	Chris Dawson	
2022–	Col Blanch	
