= Barry Matthews =

Chief Executive of New Zealand Department of Corrections
- In office 12 February 2005 – December 2010
- Preceded by: Mark Byers
- Succeeded by: Ray Smith

Commissioner of Western Australia Police
- In office 1999–2004
- Preceded by: Bob Falconer
- Succeeded by: Karl O'Callaghan

Deputy Commissioner of New Zealand Police
- In office 1995–1999

Personal details
- Born: 1946 (age 79–80)
- Police career
- Allegiance: New Zealand Police; Western Australia Police
- Department: Department of Corrections (New Zealand)
- Service years: 1965–2005
- Rank: Commissioner (1999–2005); Deputy Commissioner (1995–1999)

Barry Matthews (born 1946) was Chief Executive of the New Zealand Department of Corrections from 2005 to 2010. Prior to that he was a long-time police officer. Matthews worked in the public sectors of New Zealand and Australia for almost four decades.

== Police ==
Matthews was in the New Zealand Police from 1965 to 1999. He was District Commander, Auckland Services District from 1992 to 1993, then Assistant Commissioner Planning and Finance, Police National Headquarters from 1993 to 1995. In 1995 he became the Deputy Commissioner of Police and was the project manager of the failed INCIS computer system, until the project was abandoned in 1999. In 1999, he left to take up appointment as Commissioner of the Western Australia Police. His over-riding task as Commissioner was to root out police corruption in Western Australia. This led to a confrontation with senior politicians who asked him to resign.

== Department of Corrections ==
Matthews replaced Mark Byers as chief executive of the New Zealand Department of Corrections in February 2005.

In 2009 Matthews's leadership was questioned by the new Corrections Minister, Judith Collins, after a run of bad publicity that included the murder of 17-year-old Liam Ashley in a prison van; the murder of Karl Kuchenbecker by Graeme Burton six months after he was released on parole; and the Auditor General's critical report on the Probation Service's management of parolees. Matthews exacerbated speculation about his leadership when he stated "there's no blood on my hands", regarding Burton incident.

After an Auditor General's report was released in 2009, Collins refused to express confidence in Matthews and media commentators expected him to resign. An enquiry into the Corrections Department was conducted by the State Services Commissioner Iain Rennie, which revealed that Corrections had made efforts to improve and had warned the government of the day and the previous government that under-resourcing was putting public safety at risk. As a result, Matthews refused to resign, keeping his job and serving out his term. On his retirement he admitted he had dealt with so many crises, the Department was like a "landmine".

He was Chief Executive until December 2010 when he resigned. After his resignation, Matthews listed the installation of cell phone blocking technology at prisons throughout the country, better sentence compliance by the Probation Service and the establishment of the Professional Standards Unit which investigates corruption by prison officers as his top achievements while he was Chief Executive.
