= Sneja Gunew =

Australian-Canadian literary theorist

Sneja Marina Gunew (15 December 1946 – 8 January 2024), FRSC, was an Australian-Canadian literary theorist whose focus lay on feminism, postcolonial studies and multiculturalism. She taught in England, Australia, and Canada. From 1995 to her retirement in 2014 she was Professor of English and Director of the Centre for Women's and Gender Studies at the University of British Columbia (UBC) in Vancouver. Her scholarly research into multicultural (non-Anglo-Celtic) writers in Australia and Canada, particularly women writers, as well as her engagement with multicultural policy-making in Australia, brought these groups to attention in both countries.

== Life and education ==
Gunew was born in Tübingen, Germany, to a German mother and a Bulgarian father. The family relocated in 1950 to Melbourne, Australia, under the auspices of the International Refugee Organization. A speaker and reader of German from childhood, she turned to English, obtaining a BA (Hons) from the University of Melbourne, an MA from the University of Toronto, Canada, and a PhD from the University of Newcastle, New South Wales, all in English literature.

== Career ==
She taught in literature and women's studies in Australia from 1972, first at the universities of Newcastle and Melbourne, and then from 1979 at Deakin University (Geelong). In 1993 she took up a position at the University of Victoria, Canada, and in 1995 she became Professor of English and Women's Studies at UBC. She was Director of the Centre for Research in Women’s and Gender Studies (2002–2007), North American editor of Feminist Theory (Sage; 2006–2010), and Associate Principal of the College for Interdisciplinary Studies, UBC (2008–2011). She retired as Professor Emerita in 2014 from the UBC Department of English Language and Literatures.

=== Australia ===
Significant publications began when she was appointed to Deakin University in 1979 and worked on courses in Women’s Studies and Narrative. She introduced the terms migration writing and migrant literatures, focusing on the experiences and writings of postwar immigrants to Australia from countries other than the usual sources of migrants: UK and Ireland. These interests converged in her much reprinted article, ”Migrant Women Writers: Who's on Whose Margins?”(originally published in Meanjin, 42.1, March 1982-83, pp. 16–26) which noted that the settler-colonial category of “Australian literature” overlooked such work.

Looking at migrant women’s writing is a way of contesting received notions of the literary. Such writing speaks from positions which interrogate socio-cultural conventions, notions of linguistic competence, and gender certainties. Migrant, and women’s and migrant women’s, writing are the “excess” of Anglo-Celtic writing, a luxury which is an index of – what? Civilized skepticism? The mining rights to an unknown territory? New histories for new subjects?

In 1984, she was a panelist with Homi Bhabha and Gayatri Spivak at an early landmark postcolonial conference, “Europe and its Others,” at the University of Essex. Edward Said, author of Orientalism (1978), a founding figure of post-colonial theory, was in the audience.

In a 1986 interview with Spivak, she asks “[Why] are other writers like [Antigone] Kefala, Ania Walwicz, Rosa Cappiello, etc., not seen as part of these [Australian] cultural productions, why aren't they given a full measure of cultural franchise?”

She and others took action to have non-Anglo-Celtic writers acknowledged as contributing to the national literature. In 1992, she compiled with others A Bibliography of Australian Multicultural Writers and co-edited Striking Chords: Multicultural Literary Interpretations, the first collection of critical essays to deal with ethnic minority writings in the Australian context. She noted that multicultural writers are often “fungible,” like money, in the sense that any one will do: those that appear in early national anthologies are exchanged for new ones as a demonstration of tolerance, with none “sticking” as part of the national literature nor arriving in the canon. Her positioning begins with the idea of the “cultural hybridity of all nation-states” that leads to a “productive opening up into difference.” For her, the ostensibly all-inclusive “liberal pluralist notion of cultural diversity” cannot recognize or discuss “incommensurable differences,” which leads to the inability to interrogate any eruption of right-wing “politics of exclusion.” She turns to psychoanalysis to remind readers that “we do have an unconscious, whose mysterious workings are not fully available to our conscious minds, and that our unsound impulses cannot simply be vacuumed with a morally attuned feminist Hoover”

At Deakin University, she set up the first library collection of ethnic minority writings in Australia. Her first book, Framing Marginality: Multicultural Literary Studies (1994) was an attempt to find theoretical frameworks and concepts for interpreting these texts—a mix of postmodernist and psychoanalytic criticism. She also edited two collections that publicized Australian feminist work to an international readership as well as ensuring this included the work of Australian First Nations scholar Jackie Huggins.

As a member of the Australia Council for the Arts, the main funding body for the arts in Australia (1990–93), she set up and chaired the Multicultural Advisory Committee. In addition she was involved in creating appropriate policies relating to multicultural arts at a federal and state level as part of her membership on several committees working towards a multicultural Australia.

=== Canada ===
In Canada she worked on comparative multiculturalisms and diasporic literatures and their intersections with national and global cultural formations. Recent publications dealt with multilingual affect, looking to widen the terminology of affect studies to include “emotion terms” in languages other than English. She writes:

What is very much a question for me at the moment is that if you are constructed in one particular kind of language, what kinds of violence does it do to your subjectivity if one then has to move into another language, and suppress whatever selves or subjectivities were constructed by the first? And of course, some people have to pass through this process several times.

Her final word on how to navigate literary-critical problems is “Hurrah for anything that puts into question certain familiar hegemonic monocultural assumptions.”

== Personal life ==
Gunew was married to the British-Canadian artist Terence Greer (24 September 1929 – 5 July 2020).

== Selected works ==
- Framing Marginality: Multicultural literary studies, Melbourne University Press (1994).
- Haunted Nations: The colonial dimensions of multiculturalisms, Routledge (2004).
- Post-Multicultural Writers as Neo-Cosmopolitan Mediators, Anthem Press (2017). ISBN 9781783086634
- Displacements: Migrant Story-tellers, Deakin UP, 1981. Revised as Displacements 2: Multicultural Storytellers. Deakin UP, 1987. (Edited with J. Mahyuddin) Beyond the Echo: Multicultural Women's Writing. U of Queensland P, 1988. ISBN 978-0702220852 (Edited with A. Couani) Telling Ways: Australian Women's Experimental Writing. Australian Feminist Studies Publications, 1988. ISBN 9780863960680 Feminist Knowledge: Critique and Construct. Routledge, 1990. Rpt. Routledge Library Editions, 2013. ISBN 9780415754132 A Reader in Feminist Knowledge. Routledge, 1991. ISBN 9780415046985. Translated into Bulgarian, 2002. (With K. O. Longley) Striking Chords: Multicultural Literary Interpretations. Allen & Unwin, 1992. ISBN 9781863730891
- (Compiled with L. Houbein, A. Karakostas-Seda and J. Mahyuddin) A Bibliography of Australian Multicultural Writers, Centre for Studies in Literary Education, Deakin University, Australia, 1992. ISBN 0730015033 (With Anna Yeatman) Feminism and the Politics of Difference. Allen & Unwin, 1993. ISBN 9780367159023 (With Fazal Rizvi) Culture, Difference and the Arts. Allen & Unwin, 1994. ISBN 978-1863737425
- “Migrant Women Writers: Who's on Whose Margins?” Meanjin, 42.1 (March, 1982/3): 16-26. Reprinted in The Temperament of Generations: Fifty Years of Writing in Meanjin. Ed. Jenny Lee, Philip Mead & Gerald Murnane. Melbourne UP. 1990, 303-12; in Gender, Politics and Fiction: Twentieth Century Australian Women's Novels, edited by Carole Ferrier (St Lucia: University of Queensland Press, 1985): 163-78; and in part in Authority of Influence: Australian Literary Criticism 1950-2000. Ed. D. Bird, R. Dixon and C. Lee. U of Queensland P, 2001, 216-219.
