= Department of Corrections (New Zealand) =

New Zealand government department

- Ara Poutama Aotearoa

Department overview
- Formed: 1995
- Preceding Department: Department of Justice
- Jurisdiction: New Zealand
- Headquarters: Mayfair House, 44–52 The Terrace, Wellington 6011
- Employees: 10000+ FTE staff (30 June 2020)
- Annual budget: Total budget for 2023/24 ▼$2,565,051
- Minister responsible: Hon Mark Mitchell, Minister of Corrections
- Department executive: Jeremy Lightfoot, Chief Executive
- Website: www.corrections.govt.nz

The Department of Corrections (Māori: Ara Poutama Aotearoa) is the public service department of New Zealand charged with managing the New Zealand corrections system. This includes the operations of the 18 prisons in New Zealand and services run by Probation. Corrections' role and functions were defined and clarified with the passing of the Corrections Act 2004. This includes the provision of rehabilitation programmes and the reintegration of prisoners back into the community. In 2024, Corrections had about 10,000 staff responsible for managing around 10,000 prison inmates and 30,000 offenders in the community.

To ensure the department is looking after prisoners in a safe and humane manner, the Ombudsman is required to conduct unnanounced visits to prisons and to investigate the Department's operations.

== Corrections purpose ==
Section 5 of the Act defines four goals that the department is required to achieve:

- ensure that sentences and orders imposed by the courts and the parole board are administered in a "safe, secure, humane, and effective manner;"
- ensure that prisons are operated in accordance with the Act and the United Nations Standard Minimum Rules for the Treatment of Prisoners;
- assist in the rehabilitation and reintegration of prisoners back into the community;
- provide background information on offenders to the courts and the Parole Board to assist them in decision-making.

=== Safe and humane treatment ===
Staff shortages have led to concerns that prisoners have been locked in their cells for up to 23 hours a day, or even longer; they may wait up to three months to see a prison doctor; Those in prison are four times more likely to attempt suicide than the general population, and twice as likely to experience suicidal ideation.

=== Rehabilitation ===
An investigation by the Ombudsman into the treatment of prisoners in 2004 found that the availability of rehabilitation programmes was extremely limited. Some improvements have been made and in 2009 it was announced that up to 1,000 prisoners a year would be able to access drug treatment programmes in prison by 2011.

In 2012, Corrections was tasked by the Government with reducing re-offending by 25% by 2017. This was a challenging target. Corrections Annual Report from 2017 shows an average reduction in reoffending achieved by 21 different programmes and interventions of 5.3%. However, 35% of prisoners are on short sentences (under two years) and historically, have had very limited access to rehabilitation programmes, as these are prioritized for longer-term inmates with more serious offending.

Since 2018, the effectiveness of the department's programmes has declined even further. For instance, Corrections offers rehabilitation programmes targeting criminal thinking and decision making. One such programme, the Medium Intensity Rehabilitation Programme (MIRP), is delivered in the community and most prisons. Corrections Annual Report for 2024 found that this program reduced reoffending (in the 12 months after release from prison) by only 1%.

=== Providing information ===
Section 26A(1) of the Sentencing Act requires probation officers to prepare presentence reports on approximately 30,000 defendants appearing in court each year. In an interview with Radio New Zealand in 2019, Chester Borrows, chair of the Criminal Justice Reform Panel, said judges and lawyers were dissatisfied with the quality of these reports. He added “presentence reports currently being prepared for Court were badly written and did not provide relevant information. We are hearing from judges and from lawyers that they are cut and paste documents using the same phrases over and over again”. Nigel Hampton, KC is quoted as saying: “the pre-sentencing reports have turned from in-depth studies to routine 'box-ticking' exercises over the past 20 years.”

Judges also receive information about defendants from a limited number of alcohol and drug assessments, and from mental health assessments ordered under section 38 of the Criminal Procedure (Mentally Impaired Persons) Act 2003. Cultural reports used to provide more detailed information but legal funding for these was abolished in 2024.

== Ombudsman's concerns ==
2005: The Ombudsmen, Mel Smith and John Belgrave, released the results of their Investigation of the Department of Corrections in relation to the detention and treatment of prisoners. They expressed concerns about the lack of work, lack of rehabilitation programmes, the lack of recreation, the extent of property loss, the effect of security classifications which imposed additional restrictions, and the “66% rule” - whereby programmes aimed at reducing reoffending, such as drug and alcohol treatment were postponed until a prisoner had served two-thirds (approximately 66%) of their sentence.

They also found significant differences in the way front-line staff described problems within prisons than National Office acknowledged in their formal correspondence with the Ombudsmen - adding "we prefer the picture presented by front-line staff".

2023: Chief Ombudsman, Peter Boshier, published a report in which he said the department had a risk-averse and reactive organisational culture, and that it failed to focus its efforts on the fair, safe and humane treatment of people in prison. He called for an "urgent reset" at Corrections. His investigation was prompted by the 2020/2021 Waikeria Prison riots, where many of the problems had already been identified in previous reports, but his recommendations to address them had not been implemented.

2024: In a report in 2024 into the Prisoners of Extreme Risk Unit (PERU), he described the unit's conditions as "cruel, inhuman, and degrading". In 2025, he criticized the Department as "dinosaurian", saying they were too slow in responding to his recommendations.

2025: By law, prisoners are entitled to a minimum of one hour out of their cells (to exercise and make phone calls) every day. In December 2025, a High Court judge ordered Corrections chief executive to obey the law or face contempt of court proceedings. Civil rights lawyer, Amanda Hill, told Radio New Zealand that Corrections has often ignored this requirement generally blaming short staffing. She said: "This has been raised for coming up 10 years in different forums, the Ombudsman's raised it, the prison inspectors raised it, there's been litigation about it, and the Department has ignored the High Court's directions that [short staffing isn't] a reason to deny minimum entitlement."

== Chief Executives ==
Jeremy Lightfoot was appointed as Chief Executive in February 2020. Previous chief executives include: Mark Byers, Barry Matthews, and Ray Smith.

== History ==
Prior to 1995 the country's prisons, probation system and the courts were all managed by the Department of Justice. The Department of Corrections was formed in 1995 by the Department of Justice (Restructuring) Act 1995. This act gave management of prisoners, parolees and offenders on probation to the Department of Corrections while leaving administration of the court system and fines collection.

Mark Byers was chief executive of the Department of Corrections for its first ten years, retiring in 2005. Byers oversaw a range of organisational initiatives and, in 2000, introduced a new computer system called "Integrated Offender Management". At the time, this was described as "the biggest single initiative the Department has undertaken to reduce reoffending." IOMS cost $40 million but had no impact of the rate of re-conviction which remained at 55% two years after release.

Barry Matthews served as chief executive from 2005 to 2010. In a farewell interview, he listed his top three achievements as the implementation of cell phone blocking technology in prisons, better enforcement by the Probation Service of sentence compliance, and the establishment of the Professional Standards Unit to investigate corruption by prison officers.

=== Privatisation ===
In 2000, New Zealand's first privately run prison, the Auckland Central Remand Prison, also known as Mt. Eden Prison, opened under contract to Australasian Correctional Management (ACM). However, the use of private prisons in New Zealand has been controversial. The Labour government was opposed to privatisation, and in 2004, amended the law to prohibit the extension of private prison contracts. A year later, the 5-year contract with ACM was not renewed.

In 2010, the National government again introduced private prisons and international conglomerate Serco was awarded the contract to run the Mt Eden Prison. In 2015, Serco's contract to run the Mount Eden prison was revoked due to numerous scandals and operation was given back to the New Zealand Department of Corrections. Serco was ordered to pay $8 million to the New Zealand government as a result of problems at Mount Eden Prison while it was under Serco's management.

Despite its poor performance, Serco was subsequently given the contract to build and manage a new 960-bed prison at Wiri. Corrections contract with Serco provides stiff financial penalties if its rehabilitation programmes fail to reduce reoffending by 10% more than the Corrections Department programmes. The Auckland South Corrections Facility was opened on 8 May 2015. The contract to operate the prison ends in 2040.

== Growth in prison population ==
In 1950, there were 1,043 New Zealanders in prison. Between 1950 and 2018, the prison population rose from 1,043 to 10,820 – an increase of over 1,000%. At 201 prisoners per 100,000 of population (in 2018), this meant New Zealand had one of the highest rates of imprisonment in the Western world.

The increase was largely driven by politicians of the major political parties in New Zealand competing to be tough on crime - in a process known as penal populism. Between 2000 and 2008, the Fifth Labour Government built four prisons – at Ngawha (Northern Region) housing 420 prisoners, Spring Hill (north of Huntly) housing 840, Auckland Women's housing 330 and Milton (Otago) housing 425 – at a cost of $890 million. When National came to power in 2008, the department built a new 1,000 bed prison at Mt Eden for $218 million in a public private partnership and gave the contract to Serco.

The department's growth has been such that in July 2010, Finance Minister Bill English expressed concerns that government spending was "led by a rapidly expanding prison system which would soon make Corrections the government's biggest department". As at December 2011, New Zealand had 20 prisons and the department employed over 8,000 staff. By 2025, the number of staff had risen to 10,000.

Despite English's concerns about the growing cost, in 2011 the government approved the building of a new 960-bed prison at Wiri estimated to cost nearly $400 million. Later that year justice sector forecasts showed a drop in the projected prison forecast for the first time. Charles Chauvel, Labour Party spokesperson for justice, and the Public Service Association both questioned the need for a new prison when there were 1,200 empty beds in the prison system. In March 2012, Corrections Minister Anne Tolley announced that the new prison would enable older prisons such as Mt Crawford in Wellington and the New Plymouth prison to be closed. Older units at Arohata, Rolleston, Tongariro/Rangipo and Waikeria prisons will also be shut down.

In 2018, the Labour Government announced a plan to reduce the prison population by 30% over 15 years. While Labour was in Government the prison population dropped more than 25 per cent, from a peak of 10,820 to 7677 in March 2022. Since the coalition of National, ACT and New Zealand First became Government in 2023, the muster has gone back up over 10,000 again for the first time in four years.

=== Sentence length ===
Although the number of inmates currently stands at about 10,000, the prison population is very fluid, and altogether up to 20,000 people spend time in prison each year. Nearly 75% of those given a prison sentence are sentenced to two years or less, as their offending is relatively minor. Short term prisoners are automatically released halfway through their sentence.

However, at any one time about 50% of those in prison are serving long sentences (more than two years), usually for sexual, violent and serious drug offences.

=== Growth of remand population ===
A large percentage of people in prison are on remand while waiting for their cases to be finalised in court. In December 2024, 41% of male prisoners and 53% of female prisoners were on remand, double the remand rates of 10 years ago.

=== Rate of imprisonment ===
As of 2025, New Zealand's imprisonment rate is 187 prisoners per 100,000 people, which is significantly higher than many comparable countries such as Canada (90 per 100,000), Australia (163 per 100,000), and England (141 per 100,000). This places New Zealand among the countries with the highest incarceration rates in the OECD, driven primarily by competition between political parties to be tough on crime at successive elections.

=== Recidivism ===
Recidivism can be measured by the rate at which offenders are reconvicted and/or reimprisoned. Around 56.5% of prisoners are reconvicted within two years of being released, and about 35.8% are re-imprisoned within two years of being released. For those in prison for the first time, the re-imprisonment rate is 30%, but for recidivists, the re-imprisonment rate is 60%. The more time someone has spent in prison, the more likely they are to return to prison following any given release.

== Profile of typical prisoner ==
The typical prisoner in New Zealand often comes from a background of poverty, trauma, and systemic disadvantage, with Māori disproportionately represented (52% of the prison population despite being 15% of the general population). Children from such backgrounds have increased rates of behavioural problems, early substance abuse, depression and anxiety, which may eventually contribute to criminal offending. Gangs often provide a sense of belonging for children who grow up experiencing systemic neglect and abuse. These affiliations perpetuate cycles of crime and violence.

Socio-economic hardship plays a significant role, with many prisoners experiencing poor school performance, undiagnosed learning difficulties, and limited access to education or stable housing. Up to 87% of prisoners in New Zealand were unemployed immediately before their imprisonment. Most prisoners are male (93.9%) and under 40 years old. Nearly half struggle with literacy challenges.

Those who have been sexually abused or subject to serious violence as children have increased rates of post-traumatic stress disorder. For instance, 77% of prisoners have been victims of violence, and over half of incarcerated women report being sexually assaulted. Mental health issues are widespread, with over 62% diagnosed with conditions such as PTSD, depression, or substance use disorders. Neurodiverse conditions like fetal alcohol spectrum disorder (FASD), ADHD, autism spectrum disorder, and traumatic brain injuries (TBI) are also overrepresented in prisons.

Individuals from these backgrounds often resort to substance abuse in a process of self-medication, so addiction issues also drive criminal behaviour. Up to 80% of defendants appearing in Court meet criteria for a substance use disorder and a 2016 study found that of those sent to prison, 91% had a lifetime diagnosis of either a mental health or substance use disorder.

== Cost to taxpayers ==
In 2001 the department estimated that a lifetime of offending by one person costs victims and taxpayers $3 million. The cost of keeping a person in prison for 12 months is estimated at $150,000.

In 2024, Corrections' operating and capital budget was $1.94 billion. This included funding for the Waikeria Prison expansion, increased prison capacity, and additional corrections officers.

== Rehabilitation policies ==
Section 6 of the Corrections Act 2004 states offenders must be given access to activities that may contribute to their rehabilitation and reintegration into the community "so far as is reasonable and practicable in the circumstances within the resources available." Corrections research suggests that if a rehabilitative programme required as part of the sentence could reform just one high-risk offender, that success would be worth at least $500,000 of "benefit" in the form of avoided costs to Police, Courts, Corrections, income support, and victims.

=== IOMS ===
In 2000, a rehabilitation approach based on enhanced computerised access to information about offenders was tried. The new chief executive of the department, Mark Byers, introduced a $40 million scheme designed to reduce reoffending called Integrated Offender Management System (IOMS). At the time it was described as "the biggest single initiative the department has undertaken to reduce reoffending". Seven years later, Criminologist Greg Newbold said the scheme was an expensive failure and described it as "another wreck on the scrapheap of abandoned fads of criminal rehabilitation."

=== Addictions ===
Research suggests that nearly 90% of offenders were alcohol or drug affected in the period leading up to their offence. In 2004 an Ombudsman's investigation into the treatment of prisoners found that only 174 inmates a year were able to receive substance abuse treatment. Since then successive governments have responded by establishing additional Drug Treatment Units (DTU's) within the prison system. By 2011, this increased the number of prisoners able to attend drug treatment to 1,000 a year. This represents only 5% of the more than 20,000 people who spend time in prison each year.

Unfortunately, these Drug Treatment Units are almost totally ineffective. In 2023, the six month drug treatment program reduced reoffending by only 1.9%. In 2024, this programme reduced reoffending by 0.1%.

=== Criminal thinking ===
Corrections also offers rehabilitation programmes targeting criminal thinking and decision making. One such programme called Straight Thinking was delivered to offenders in the community and in prison. Between 2000 and 2006 over 10,000 offenders were required to attend this programme until an evaluation found it appeared to increase the likelihood of re-offending rather than reducing it. The Department replaced Straight Thinking with the Medium Intensity Rehabilitation Programme (MIRP). In 2011, an evaluation of the MIRP found that two years after completing this programme, the reduction in recidivism was zero per cent.

=== Results ===
In 2012 the government announced that an extra $65 million would be put into rehabilitation, in an effort to reduce re-offending by 25% within five years. Five years later, the Department's Annual report for 2018 shows its 17 prison based rehabilitation programmes reduced reoffending by an average of only 5.5%. Only three of the 17 results were considered statistically significant.

In 2024, Corrections offered eight different rehabilitation programmes in prison. The average reduction in reoffending achieved by these programmes was 2.3%. The Alcohol and Other Drug Treatment Court in Auckland reduces the reoffending of graduates by 86%.

=== Reintegration strategies ===
The poor performance of the department's rehabilitation programmes is partly due to inadequate support provided to prisoners on release. Over 10,000 people on short-term sentences are released from prison each year. Another 2,500 long term inmates are released by the Parole Board. Corrections lists the need for employment, accommodation, education and training, and supportive family and community relationships as key factors.

Of these reintegration needs, finding suitable accommodation is the most significant hurdle. Historically, reintegration has been difficult partly because the department funds only two halfway houses with a total of 28 beds in the whole country – Salisbury Street Trust in Christchurch and Moana House in Dunedin (co-funded by the Ministry of Health). Less than 1% of the 9,000 prisoners released each year go into them. (In Canada, 60% of federal prisoners are released into halfway houses. There are no halfway houses funded by Corrections in the North Island where the bulk of prisoners are held. There are no halfway houses for women funded by Corrections anywhere in the country.

== Suicide in prisons ==
Prisoners are four times more likely to attempt suicide and twice as likely to experience suicidal ideation than the general population. One of the factors contributing to the suicide rate is the high rate of mental health problems experienced by prisoners. The 'Health in Justice' Report conducted in 2010 by the Ministry of Health found 52% of prisoners had a history of psychotic, mood, or anxiety disorders. Twenty percent of those surveyed (about 1,700 prisoners) said they were ‘thinking a lot about suicide’.

Only limited psychiatric care is available. In its Investigation into Medical and Health Services available to Prisoners, the Ombudsman reported in 2011 that the Corrections Department does not meet Article 22(1) of the United Nations Minimum Standard Rules for the Treatment of Prisoners. This article requires every prison to provide psychiatric services to a similar level to that which is available in the community. The Ombudsman found prison healthcare to be "reactive rather than proactive" and mental health care available to prisoners to be "inadequate or unsuitable".

== Violence in prisons ==
In regard to the requirement to provide 'safe and humane' treatment in prisons, there are frequent assaults on inmates and staff. According to Corrections, between 2020 and 2024, prisoners made an average of 23 serious assaults (requiring medical intervention) on staff each year and an average of 38 serious assaults on other prisoners. These figures may not be reliable. Dr Armon Tamatea says there are an average of 9,000 violent incidents a year across 18 prisons, and approximately 130 are serious. The COBRA database which is designed to record all incidents in prison, shows that in 2020, there were 898 serious assaults on other prisoners and 276 serious assaults on staff.

Thousands of prisoners request voluntary segregation each year to avoid violence and gang related problems in mainstream prison units, rising from 4% of inmates in 1983 to 35% in 2023.

On rare occasions, these assaults have led to deaths.

- In 2006, 17-year-old Liam Ashley was stomped and strangled to death by George Baker in the back of a van transporting them to Mt Eden prison from court. Ashley's death led to the introduction of waist restraints in prison vans which lock the inmates hands at their sides.
- In 2011, Killer Beez gang member, Latu Kepu, punched a prison officer - 33 year old Jason Palmer - in the face. Palmer fell back, hit his head and died later as a result of brain injuries.
- In April 2015, a 44-year-old inmate, Benton Parata, died in Christchurch Men's Prison after being bashed by three other prisoners.
- In December 2023, Donovon Michael Duff, 47, fatally stabbed another prisoner, Brian George and was charged with causing grievous bodily harm to another prisoner Po-Chen Chien.
- In 2024, two prisoners were killed in Mt Eden Corrections Facility by their cellmates. This has highlighted the risks due to double bunking whereby two prisoners are placed in the same cell.

== See also ==
- Prisoners' rights in New Zealand
- List of correctional facilities in New Zealand
- Corrections Association of New Zealand
- New Zealand Parole Board
- New Zealand Probation Service
