= Barry Nelson (rugby league) =

Australian rugby league footballer and administrator (1932–2021)

Personal information
- Full name: Barry Clyde Nelson
- Born: 26 December 1931
- Died: 1 May 2021 (aged 89)

Playing information
- Position: Prop
Club
Years	Team	Pld	T	G	FG	P
1954–55, 1959–61	Canterbury-Bankstown	56	5	0	0	15
1962–63	Newtown Jets	33	1	2	0	7
	Total	89	6	2	0	22
Representative
Years	Team	Pld	T	G	FG	P
1959	NSW Firsts	1	0	0	0	0
- Source: Whittacker/Hudson As of 27 Aug 2020

Barry Clyde Nelson OAM was an Australian rugby league footballer who played in the 1950s. He played for the Newtown and Canterbury-Bankstown clubs.

Nelson played five seasons of first grade rugby league with the Canterbury-Bankstown Bulldogs between 1954-1955 and 1959-1961 and is listed as the Bulldogs' player No.196. He spent a year or two captain-coaching in Gilgandra in 1956-57 before returning to the Bulldogs. He represented New South Wales on one occasion in 1959 and finished his career at Newtown Jets for two seasons between 1962 and 1963.

During the 1980s and 1990s, Nelson was club president of the Canterbury-Bankstown Bulldogs. He and secretary Peter Moore, oversaw a very successful 1980s, yielding 4 premierships and as a stable committee, oversaw the Bulldogs' success into the 1990s. He was club president from 1982 to 2002.

In the 2002 Queen's Birthday Honours Nelson was awarded the medal of the Order of Australia for "service to Rugby League football, particularly through the Bulldogs League Club".

Nelson died in May 2021.
