= Peter McFarline =

Australian journalist

Peter Muir McFarline OAM (27 March 1945 – 7 April 2002) was an Australian journalist best known for his work as a cricket writer. He has been called one of Australia's greatest cricket writers.

He began his career working for The Courier Mail and later became a writer for The Age. His achievements included breaking the story of World Series Cricket in 1977.

During his final years he was afflicted by the debilitating spinal illness, syringomyelia. This first affected him in 1982 and eventually rendered him a quadriplegic. During his last few years he dictated his copy to his wife, Dell.

He was played by actor Adam Zwar in the 2012 TV mini-series Howzat! Kerry Packer's War.

In 2000, McFarline was presented with the Australian Sports Medal in recognition of his media coverage, 1968 to the date of award. Posthumously, in the 2002 Queen's Birthday Honours, he was awarded the Medal of the Order of Australia for "service to journalism, particularly sports journalism".
