= Graham Jackson (businessman) =

Australian retired businessman (born 1931/1932)

Graham Jackson OAM
- Born: 1931 or 1932 (age 94–95); Brisbane, Queensland, Australia
- Education: James Cook University (DCom (h.c), 2021)
- Occupations: Businessman, gemologist
- Known for: An extensive career in the jewellery industry
- Awards: Queensland Great (2011)

Graham Robert Jackson OAM (born 1931 or 1932) is an Australian retired businessman.

Best known for his extensive career as a jeweller, Jackson was the foundation chairman and managing director of Australian buying group Showcase Jewellers.

== Life and career ==
Jackson was born in Brisbane.

After time in Toowoomba where he had a Holden car sub-dealership, Jackson briefly managed his father-in-law's jewellery business in Murwillumbah.

After considering opening his own jewellery business in Brisbane, Jackson decided against it and instead went to Townsville in 1957 to become general manager of Vaculug North Queensland, which specialised in maintaining the tyres of large earth moving equipment.

After qualifying as a gemologist, Jackson finally established his own local jewellery shop called Loloma in Townsville's Flinders Street in 1959 which ultimately grew to a franchise of seven stores throughout North Queensland before he became the foundation chairman and managing director of buying group Showcase Jewellers.

He has also served as president of Townsville Enterprise Ltd as well as director and deputy chairman of the Queensland Small Business Development Corporation.

Jackson has been a supporter of many charitable organisations including the Salvation Army. Jackson is credited with helping the charity secure land for a local drug and alcohol treatment centre.

Jackson retired at the age of 88 in 2020.

== Honours ==
In the 2002 Queen's Birthday Honours, Jackson was awarded a Medal of the Order of Australia in recognistion of his service to the city of Townsville through his work with social welfare, service and health organisations as well as his contribution to local sport.

Jackson was named as a Queensland Great in 2011.

In 2021, James Cook University bestowed Jackson with an honorary Doctor of Commerce degree.
