= Chris Dawson (governor) =

Governor of Western Australia since 2022

His Excellency The Honourable Chris Dawson AC APM
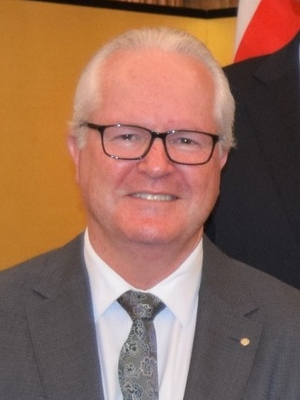
- Dawson in 2022

34th Governor of Western Australia
- Incumbent
- Assumed office 15 July 2022
- Monarchs: Elizabeth II; Charles III
- Premier: Mark McGowan; Roger Cook
- Lieutenant Governor: Peter Quinlan
- Preceded by: Kim Beazley

Commissioner of Western Australia Police
- In office 15 August 2017 – 14 July 2022
- Preceded by: Karl O'Callaghan
- Succeeded by: Col Blanch

Personal details
- Born: Christopher John Dawson; 1958/1959 (age 65–66)
- Spouse: Darrilyn
- Children: 2
- Education: Perth Modern School
- Profession: Police officer Public servant
- Police career
- Allegiance: Western Australia Police Force
- Department: Australian Criminal Intelligence Commission; Australian Institute of Criminology; 2014–2017
- Branch: State Emergency and Vaccine Coordination
- Service years: 1976–2022
- Rank: Commissioner (2017–2022); Deputy Commissioner (2004–2014); Superintendent (1999–2004)
- Awards: Australian Police Medal (2002)

Christopher John Dawson AC APM is the 34th Governor of Western Australia and a former police officer who served as the Commissioner of the Western Australia Police Force from 2017 to 2022. He was sworn in as governor on 15 July 2022.

== Police career ==
Dawson joined Western Australia Police in February 1976 as a cadet. He was promoted to superintendent in 1999. The 2002 Queen's Birthday Honours saw him receive the Australian Police Medal. Dawson was appointed Deputy Commissioner in July 2004 under Karl O'Callaghan. Dawson led security arrangements at CHOGM 2011. He left Western Australia Police in April 2014 to be chief executive officer of the Australian Criminal Intelligence Commission. He was also Director of the Australian Institute of Criminology. He became the Commissioner of Western Australia Police in August 2017. Throughout the COVID-19 pandemic, Dawson acted in a number of roles, including State Emergency Coordinator and Vaccine Commander. Dawson received an honourable send-off on 14 July 2022 at Western Australia Police headquarters after five years as commissioner.

== Governor of Western Australia ==
On 4 April 2022, Premier Mark McGowan announced Dawson as the replacement to Kim Beazley as the Governor of Western Australia, after Elizabeth II, Queen of Australia, and the WA Cabinet endorsed Dawson's appointment on the same day. He was sworn in on 15 July 2022 and was replaced as Police Commissioner by his former deputy Col Blanch. Dawson was the first police officer to be appointed as the Queen's representative for Western Australia.

Dawson was appointed a Companion of the Order of Australia in the 2023 Australia Day Honours for "eminent service to public administration through law enforcement roles, to reconciliation, and as the 34th Governor appointed in Western Australia". In October 2025, Dawson made a formal apology for the 1834 Pinjarra massacre and the actions of the then-governor James Stirling.

== Honours ==
Viceregal styles of Chris Dawson (2022–present)
- Reference style: His Excellency the Honourable
- Spoken style: Your Excellency

Orders

- 26 January 2023: Companion of the Order of Australia (AC) "For eminent service to public administration through law enforcement roles, to reconciliation, and as the 34th Governor appointed in Western Australia"
- (United Kingdom) 31 January 2023: Knight of Grace of the Order of St John

Decorations

- (Australia) 10 June 2002: Australian Police Medal (APM)

Medals

- (Australia) National Police Service Medal
- (Australia) 28 May 1992 National Medal with one bar.

Appointments

- 2023: Colonel of the Royal Western Australia Regiment.
- (United Kingdom) 2023: Deputy Prior of the Order of St John.

Police appointments
Preceded by Karl O'Callaghan	Commissioner of Western Australia Police; 2017–2022	Succeeded by Col Blanch
Government offices
Preceded by Kim Beazley	Governor of Western Australia; 2022–present	Incumbent
