= Thomas Herman Andersen =

Police commissioner of Western Australia

Thomas Herman Andersen (Note: Sometimes misspelt as "Anderson") MVO (1894–1975) was Commissioner of Police for the state of Western Australia from 1951 to 1958.

Thomas Andersen was born on 21 May 1894 in Beaconsfield, Western Australia, the son of Anton Wilhelm (William) Andersen (a farmer, and baker, originally from Denmark) and Elizabeth Rachel née Lewis. He attended St Joachim's School then St Patrick's Boys' School, after which he moved with his parents to work on a farm at Brookton.

In 1913 or 1914, aged 19, he joined the Western Australia Police Force and was subsequently posted to Broome. He was a mounted constable for about seven years, at both country and metropolitan stations, until he was transferred to foot duty after two accidents indicated that he was not suited to horses. He was subsequently transferred to the metropolitan district office.

In 1923 Andersen joined the newly formed liquor inspection branch. He was promoted to sergeant in 1934, then first class sergeant in 1938. Over the next few years he obtain qualifications in accountancy and mercantile law, and in 1945 was promoted to inspector, in charge of the branch, which by then was also responsible for firearms, weights and measures. He was promoted to chief inspector in 1949.

In 1951 he became Commissioner of Police for Western Australia, the first holder of that position to have been born in WA.

Andersen was known for his strong Catholic beliefs, strict morality, and opposition to alcohol, banning the consumption of alcohol at police social functions, and more publicly:

suppressed the use of alcohol at barbecues ... and hammered away on street drinking, the evils of alcohol usage among young folk and Aborigines and betting on licensed premises.

He also thought that gambling was "getting out of control".

As Commissioner, Andersen oversaw planning for the police presence during Queen Elizabeth's visit to the state as part of her 1954 tour of Australia. He was one of the welcoming committee on the Queen's arrival in Perth, and escorted her as she inspected some of the police patrolmen on her final day. He was awarded a Member of the Royal Victorian Order, Class IV (MVO) for his services.

In 1954 the Betting Control Board was created to regulate gambling in WA, and Andersen was appointed as chairman. He maintained his position as Police Commissioner, but from January 1955 the roles of that position were performed by James Murray O'Brien as Acting Commissioner.

Andersen retired from both the police (replaced by O'Brien) and the Betting Control Board in January 1958.

== Personal life ==
Andersen married Marie Arthémise Le-Nay in 1920 at the Star of the Sea Church, Cottesloe. They had four children.

Andersen was an active member of the Catholic community, being a member of the Catholic Young Men's Society and the Society of the Holy Name. He was a member of the Catholic Tennis Association, as a player, captain and manager in local and interstate competitions.

As well as being a policeman, he was a Fellow of the Federal Institute of Accountants, president of the National Safety Council of WA, and president of the Federation of Police and Citizens' Boys' Clubs in WA. He was a member of the Brookton lodge of the Independent Order of Odd Fellows.

Andersen died on 4 June 1975, and was buried at Karrakatta Cemetery.
