= Karl O'Callaghan =

Karl O'Callaghan APM
- Born: Karl Joseph O'Callaghan; 1956 (age 69–70); England
- Police career
- Country: Western Australia Police
- Department: Western Australia Police
- Service years: 1976–2017
- Rank: Commissioner (2004–2017); Assistant commissioner (2001–2004); Superintendent (1996–2001); Senior sergeant (1992–1996)
- Awards: Australian Police Medal

Karl Joseph O'Callaghan APM (born 1956 in England) served from 2004 to 2017 as Commissioner of the Western Australia Police.

== Biography ==
O'Callaghan was born in 1956 in England. In 1970 he moved with his family to Western Australia, where he attended Kalamunda Senior High School. After completing year 12 he joined the Western Australia Police Service as a police cadet in 1973, and in November 1975, he was inducted into the Western Australia Police Academy. In January 1976 he graduated as the dux of his Academy class. O'Callaghan's policing career has encompassed Police Communications, Port Hedland Police Station, Accident Inquiry Section, Perth Traffic Branch, Manjimup Traffic and General Duties, Community Education, and the Police Academy.

He was promoted from senior sergeant to superintendent in 1996 and was transferred to the Internal Investigations Unit and later ran both the Wheatbelt (formerly Northam) and South East Metropolitan (formerly Cannington) policing districts.

O'Callaghan later attended Curtin University of Technology and completed a Bachelor of Education with 1st Class Honours and in 1998 he became the first police officer in the history of the Western Australia Police to complete a PhD.

In 2001, he was promoted to Assistant Commissioner, Strategic and Corporate Development (formerly Policy, Planning & Evaluation) assuming responsibility for major change, reform, and information technology projects in the Western Australia Police. He later relieved in the positions of Executive Director (Corporate Services) and Deputy Commissioner (Reform). This role included responsibility for the Strategic Plan and Annual Business Planning process, legislative reform, major IT-based business re-engineering projects, replacing the Radio Communications infrastructure together with management of Corporate Projects and major Corporate Reform and implementation of Royal Commission recommendations.

In 1997, O'Callaghan was awarded a Churchill Fellowship to study ethics training and education in policing. In 2004 he was awarded the Australian Police Medal (APM). In 2006, he was made a Rotary International Paul Harris fellow for his work with communities in Western Australia. In 2011 he established Bright Blue (The Commissioner's Charity for Sick Kids) and became the inaugural chair.

== Policing career ==
In 1973, after finishing year 12, he joined the Western Australia Police as a cadet. A year later he joined the WA Police Academy where he graduated as dux of his class in 1976.

O'Callaghan was promoted to Commissioner in 2004, where he served until 2017.

O'Callaghan has been awarded the Australian Police Medal, the National Police Service Medal, the National Medal, and the Western Australia Police Medal.

Police appointments
Preceded by Barry Matthews	Commissioner of Western Australia Police; 2004–2017	Succeeded by Chris Dawson
