= Mark G. Byers =

New Zealand civil servant

Mark Byers

Chief Executive of Department of Corrections (New Zealand)
- In office 1995 – February 2005
- Succeeded by: Barry Matthews

Mark Gerard Byers is a former New Zealand civil servant who was the first Chief Executive of the New Zealand Department of Corrections from 1995 to February 2005. Byers oversaw a range of significant organizational development initiatives and major changes to the way in which offenders are managed. His policy work in this role contributed to the Corrections Act 2004.

== Civil Service career ==
Byers started his career as a public servant in the Department of Agriculture where he was involved in human resources and industrial relations work. He then went to the State Services Commission and from 1985 to 1987 he was responsible for a number of changes in public administration including a review of environmental administration agencies, and the establishment of state-owned enterprises.

He also coordinated expenditure review activity as part of the Budget setting process. In 1987, he moved to the Treasury as Deputy Secretary (Corporate Services) and thus chief operating officer for the department. Whilst in this post he improved internal management systems and reshaped the department.

Between 1990 and 1993 he was Chair of the Officials Committee on Expenditure Control working with the Treasury Ministers. At that time he was also involved in aspects of public sector management reform, including serving on the Officials Committee for the State Sector.

In 2000, Byers introduced "integrated offender management", a computerised system which was designed to aid in greatly reducing reoffending. But it made no difference to re-offending rates by prisoners, with one criminologist Dr Greg Newbold saying the system had become "a large and expensive failure". Byers resigned as CEO in February 2005.
