= St Patrick's Boys' School, Perth =

Former Catholic boys' school in Perth, Western Australia

St Patrick's Boys' School, Perth was a Roman Catholic parish primary school for boys located on Irwin St, Perth Western Australia. The school operated from 1878 until 1963, when its students were progressively transferred to Trinity College, Perth and CBC Perth.

== History ==
The school was commonly called St Pat's and it was a low fee paying primary school for boys. In 1894, the Congregation of Christian Brothers, at the invitation of Bishop Matthew Gibney, opened CBC Perth and took over the administration of St Patrick's as well as providing teaching staff. When the Brothers took over the running of the school there were 40 enrolled students. By the turn of the century, six years later, the school had 160 enrolled students.

In 1907, St Patrick's relocated to a new larger school on the corner of Wellington and Lord Streets at the bottom of the hill near St Mary's Cathedral. The site later became part of Royal Perth Hospital. The new school had a primary and a secondary school. Enrolments peaked at over 400 students. In 1938, the boarders at CBC Perth and a number of day students transferred to the new Aquinas College campus at Salter Point. To ease the crowded conditions at St Patrick's, and to overcome the depleted student numbers at CBC Perth, many St Patrick's students transferred to CBC Perth.

In 1937, the principals of CBC Highgate, CBC Fremantle and St Patrick’s Boys' School founded the Christian Brothers Secondary Schools Sports Association (now called the Associated & Catholic Colleges of Western Australia.) The association was formed for interschool sporting competition in athletics and it was first held at the WACA Ground.

As the Perth metropolitan area grew, the number of Catholic parish primary schools in the suburbs also increased. This led to a fall in student enrolments at St Patrick's. In 1948, at the insistence of Archbishop Prendiville, the Brothers agreed to make St Patrick's a secondary technical school. In 1951, the number of students at St Patrick's had fallen to the point that the school could no longer compete effectively at interschool competitions, and the school withdrew from the sporting association it helped create.

In 1962, CBC Perth moved from St Georges Tce to the new campus at Trinity College on the East Perth foreshore. Most of the students at St Patrick's transferred to Trinity. The remaining students continued at St Patrick's until it closed at the end of 1963.

== Legacy of St Patrick's Celtic Cross ==
The granite Celtic Cross of St Patrick's, which originally formed the spire of St Patrick's Boys School in Irwin St Perth, was presented to Trinity College in 1996. The Celtic Cross was placed as the centrepiece of the entry roundabout at Trinity College. Groundsman Ross Beatson complemented the Cross and the roundabout with a Celtic hedge.

== Notable alumni ==
- Thomas Herman Andersen (1894–1975), Western Australian police commissioner
- Launcelot Goody (1908–1992) – Archbishop of Perth
- John Harman (1932–1998) – Second Tonkin Ministry 1973–1974, Speaker of the Legislative Assembly 1983–1986, MLA for Maylands
- Terry Moriarty – Perth Football Club, Sandover Medal 1943 – WA Football Hall of Fame 2010
- Ray O'Connor (1926–2013) – Premier of Western Australia
