= Lolo Houbein =

Australian writer

Lolo Johanna Houbein (born 1934, Hilversum, Netherlands) is a Dutch-born Australian author of fiction and theatre as well as conservation and gardening works. She has won prizes for her work in English and Dutch. Arriving in Australia in 1958 at the age of 24, she earned the Dirk Hartog Literary Award for a work of migrant literature, for her autobiography Wrong Face in the Mirror. Her novel Walk A Barefoot Road won the Bicentennial/ABC Fiction Award in 1988. Residing in South Australia, she is also known for her writing and advocacy on environment and food.

Houbein was appointed a Member of the Order of Australia in the 2002 Queen's Birthday Honours.
