= Robert Connell (police commissioner) =

Police commissioner of Western Australia

Robert Connell OBE (1867–1956) was Commissioner of Police for the state of Western Australia between 1913 and 1933, after joining the WA Police in 1886.

He was born to Anne, née Burliegh (sic), at Waterville, County Kerry, Ireland, on 19 December 1867. His father, Lot Connell, served in the Irish Coast Guard.

Robert Connell travelled to Australia, joined the police in 1886, working at the ports of Albany and Fremantle, the goldfields of Coolgardie and the state's capital, Perth. He is mentioned in a 1913 newspaper report about a murder near Collier Bay.

Connell was appointed an Officer of the Order of the British Empire in 1932.

He retired to Albany and died in Perth on 11 June 1956.
