= Arthur Daffen =

English cricketer

Personal information
- Born: 30 December 1861; East Retford, Nottinghamshire
- Died: 9 July 1938 (aged 76); Victoria Park, Perth, Western Australia
- Batting: Right-handed
- Bowling: Right-arm fast-medium
- Relatives: Harold Daffen (son)

Domestic team information
- Years: Team
- 1890–1891: Kent
- 1896–1897: Berkshire
- FC debut: 15 May 1890 Kent v Middlesex
- Last FC: 13 August 1891 Kent v Yorkshire

Career statistics
Competition	First-class
Matches	16
Runs scored	399
Batting average	16.62
100s/50s	0/3
Top score	72*
Balls bowled	275
Wickets	7
Bowling average	20.57
5 wickets in innings	0
10 wickets in match	0
Best bowling	4/5
Catches/stumpings	8/–
- Source: ESPNcricinfo, 9 March 2017

Arthur Daffen (30 December 1861 – 9 July 1938) was an English teacher and cricketer. He played in 16 first-class matches for Kent County Cricket Club between 1890 and 1891 and later in the Minor Counties Championship for Berkshire.

== Early life ==
Daffen was born at East Retford in Nottinghamshire in 1861, the son of Thomas and Elizabeth Daffen. He was educated at Retford King Edward VI Grammar School and Trinity College, Dublin where he matriculated in October 1884 at the age of 22, and graduated with a Bachelor of Arts degree. After graduating, Daffen became a school teacher―his father's profession―working at a school on Eliot Place at Blackheath in Kent by the late 1880s. (Note: At the time there were several schools on Eliot Place, some of which have been identified simply as "Eliot Place School".)

== Cricket ==
Whilst working at Blackheath, Daffen played cricket for Blackheath and Crystal Palace Cricket Clubs. He was qualified by residence to play for Kent (Note: At the time, it was only permissible to play for a county if the player qualified, either by being born in the county, or by living in it for a period of time.) and, after scoring well for Blackheath in club matches, made his first-class debut in a County Championship match against Middlesex at Lord's in May 1890. Kent were missing two players and Daffen, called in on the strength of his club cricket, scored six and four whilst opening the batting. He went on to score half-centuries in his next three matches, including carrying his bat for 72 not out against Gloucestershire at Gloucester in June. This remained his highest first-class score and the three half-centuries were the only time he passed 50 in his first-class career.

Daffen was restricted, by working as a teacher, to when he could play senior cricket for Kent, but returned in August, playing against the touring Australians and Surrey during Canterbury Cricket Week, and then in three matches towards the end of the month as Kent finished third in the newly formed County Championship. Against the Australians he took his maiden first-class wickets, taking the last four Australian wickets for a cost of only five runs as Kent beat the tourists. After scoring 313 runs in his nine matches during 1890, the following season Daffen made a further seven Championship appearances, (Note: Kent played 14 County Championship matches during 1890 and 16 in 1891.) scoring 86 runs with a highest score of 37 not out and taking three wickets.

Primarily a defensive batsman, Daffen was described by Cricket magazine as playing "steadily" and being a "very useful and reliable batsman", and the 1890 end of season review in the magazine noted him as one of two promising batsmen given their Kent debuts during the season. He batted for four and a half hours without giving a chance against Nottinghamshire in 1890 for 57 runs before being last out in Kent's innings, an innings described as being characterised by "constant watchfulness", and his "excellent display of defensive batting" against Gloucestershire the same year was praised by Cricket.

Daffen moved away from Kent at the end of the 1891 season, taking up a post teaching English at Merchiston Castle School in Edinburgh. He played some cricket for The Grange Club in his year in Scotland, and after returning to England played for TW Grindlestone's XI and Selwood Park Cricket Club. In 1896 and 1897 he played in 16 Minor Counties Championship matches for Berkshire, taking 26 Championship wickets and scoring 267 runs for the county.

== Australia ==
By 1899 Daffen had emigrated to Australia and was married to Hannah James. His oldest son Harold was born at Brunswick, Victoria in 1899 and by 1900 the family was living at Adelaide in South Australia, Daffen having taken a Classics teaching post at Way College in the city. The school closed in 1903, and the family moved again, this time to Western Australia.

Daffen taught classics at Scotch College in the Perth suburb or Claremont, and established a farm at Kukerin, south-west of Perth where the family farmed wheat and sheep. By the time of his death in 1938 he had an extended family living in Perth, with both of his sons and two step-children living in the city as well as his sister. He was aged 76 when he died at Victoria Park.

== Bibliography ==
- Carlaw, Derek (2020). Kent County Cricketers, A to Z: Part One (1806–1914) (PDF). Cardiff: ACS.
