= 2002 Queen's Birthday Honours (Australia) =

The 2002 Queen's Birthday Honours for Australia were announced on Monday 10 June 2002 by the office of the Governor-General.

The Birthday Honours were appointments by some of the 16 Commonwealth realms of Queen Elizabeth II to various orders and honours to reward and highlight good works by citizens of those countries. The Birthday Honours are awarded as part of the Queen's Official Birthday celebrations during the month of June.

== Order of Australia ==
=== Companion (AC) ===
==== General Division ====
Recipient	Citation	Notes
Martin Carl Albrecht	For service to the construction industry, to the development of export markets, to the engineering profession, and to the community in the areas of education, corporate social responsibility and industrial safety.	
Robert James Champion de Crespigny	For service to the mining industry, to business, and to the community in the areas of cultural preservation and education.	
The Honourable John Jeremy Doyle	For outstanding judicial and community leadership as the Chief Justice of South Australia, and for service to education.	
Herbert James Elliott	For service to community leadership through the development of sport in Australia, continuing involvement in the Olympic movement at national and international levels, and as a supporter and benefactor of community and charitable organisations for youth, health promotion and cultural understanding.	
The Honourable Justice Kenneth Madison Hayne	For service to the judiciary, to the law as an outstanding scholar, barrister and jurist, and to the community in the advancement of both legal and general education.	
Hugh Matheson Morgan	For service to business and trade development, to the mining industry in Australia and internationally, particularly through leadership in the formation and evolution of sustainable development policy, and to the community through cultural and educational research activities.	
Jeanne Pratt	For outstanding leadership in the arts, for development of opportunities for young artistic talent on stage and in the orchestral field, and for service to the community through charitable and non-profit organisations.	
Stanley David Wallis	For service to business and manufacturing through strategic development of globally competitive enterprises, to enhancing the reputation of Australia internationally through reform of financial institutions and the taxation system, and to the community through support for medical research.	

=== Officer (AO) ===
==== General Division ====
Recipient	Citation	Notes
Dr John William Dale, AM	For service to the dental profession in the areas of professional development, ethics and standards, to training and education, particularly in relation to course accreditation and assessment of overseas-trained practitioners, and in the field of administration.	
Arthur Cameron Fitzgerald, AM	For service to the community, particularly in the areas of finance and administration through a broad range of health, cultural, artistic and youth organisations, and by fostering and encouraging the volunteer movement through personal example and advocacy	
Professor Ian Stewart Fraser	For service to medicine in the areas of obstetrics, gynaecology, reproductive endocrinology and family planning as a leading practitioner, researcher and educator, and to the establishment of professional and educational standards.	
Professor Robert Dennis Gibson	For service as an administrator in the tertiary education sector, particularly through the development and establishment of innovative educational programmes, modern facilities, comprehensive student services, and enhancement of the campus environment at the Queensland University of Technology.	
David Michael Gonski	For service to the community through Australian visual and performing arts organisations, through the development of government policy, and through the promotion of corporate sponsorship for the arts and for charitable organisations.	
The Honourable Elsie Kay Hallahan	For service to the community, particularly as an advocate for the needs of children, women and the elderly, in matters of social justice, and to the Parliament of Western Australia.	
Anthony John Howarth	For service to business and commerce, to the banking and finance sector, and to the community through a range of health, cultural, education and sporting groups.	
William Joseph Hughes	For service to the development of the wool scouring and export industries in Western Australia and Victoria, and to the community as a benefactor to a range of church, education, cultural and social welfare groups.	
Emeritus Professor Rhys Maengwyn Jones	For service to archaeology, particularly in the areas of research and teaching, and as a leader in matters relating to world heritage, conservation and indigenous social justice issues.	
Renata Ruzena Kaldor	For service to the community through raising awareness of issues affecting women, through leadership roles in government and community advisory bodies, and through participation in the administration of a range of cultural, medical research and sporting organisations, and to education.	
Professor Richard Graeme Larkins	For service to medicine and health as an advocate for increased investment in research, as a contributor to health policy reform, and as an initiator of innovative medical programmes and the provision of training opportunities for medical officers in the Oceania region.	
Tuong Quang Luu	For service to the development of multicultural radio broadcasting in Australia through the Special Broadcasting Service, and to the community, particularly through promoting understanding between diverse cultural groups.	
Professor John Sheppard Mackenzie	For service to microbiology research, particularly as a leading contributor in the understanding of the genetics, pathogenesis and public health implications of viruses, and to education.	
Donald Malcolm Morris	For service to the development of the Australian tourism industry, particularly in the areas of employment and income generation.	
The Honourable Justice Martin Patrick Moynihan	For service to the judiciary, particularly through the development of improved processes for the administration of justice, to the legal profession, and as a contributor to the administration of health care services through the Mater Misericordiae Hospital.	
Emeritus Professor Beryl Nashar	For service to the community, particularly through raising awareness of issues affecting women, and to education.	
Elizabeth Margaret Nattrass	For service to the arts, particularly in the area of administration, and to the community through raising awareness of social justice issues and involvement in health and other public organisations.	
Barry David O'Callaghan	For service to the community as a consultant, adviser and board member of health, aged care, religious and educational institutions in Victoria.	
Paul Joseph Ramsay	For service to the community through contributing to the establishment of private health care facilities in Australia, expanding regional television services, and as a benefactor to a range of educational, cultural, artistic and sporting organisations.	
Professor John Douglas Ritchie	For service in recording the history of the social sciences and the humanities in Australia as General Editor of the Australian Dictionary of Biography, particularly in the maintenance of international standards of historical biography and encouragement of new initiatives in the field.	
Jeanne Alida Ruff-Oherne	For outstanding service to the international community as an advocate for human rights and the protection of women in war, and for leadership in encouraging articulation of war-related atrocities.	
Emeritus Professor Lloyd Norman Sansom	For service to pharmacy in the development and implementation of 'best practice' principles for the profession, medication management and education, and as a contributor to the development of national pharmaceutical policy.	
William Faulding Scammell	For service to the community through a broad range of health care and research, education and sporting organisations, and to the pharmaceutical manufacturing and distribution industry.	
John Patrick Shanahan	For service to the law, particularly through enhancing the standing of the District Court of Queensland in rural and regional areas, to the community, and to the Reserve Forces.	
Wolfgang Georg Sievers	For service to the arts as a photographer, and to recording Australian cultural life and heritage through the visual documentation of Australian industry and architecture of the 20th Century.	
David Burnet Sugden	For service to engineering, particularly through the development of tunnelling machinery and management of large-scale underground construction works, and to professional education as a mentor and teacher to young graduates.	
Professor Richard Deane Terrell	For service to higher education, particularly as a pioneer in establishing international links between Australian and overseas universities, as a leading contributor to organisations bridging the academic and business sectors, and as an administrator and educator.	
Michael Rayner Thwaites	For service to the community, to the Anglican Diocese of Canberra-Goulburn, and to literature as an author of poetry and narrative works reflecting the emergence of Australia's nationhood.	
Clifford Possum Tjapaltjarri	For service as a contributor to and pioneer of the development of the Western Desert art movement, and to the indigenous community through interpretation of ancient traditions and cultural values.	
The Honourable Dr Justice Peter George Underwood	For service to the judiciary and to the law, particularly in the areas of law reform, legal education and mentoring of young practitioners, and to the community as a leader in cultural and artistic organisations in Tasmania.	
Dr Timothy Alexander Welborn	For service to medicine as a clinician and educator developing and implementing research and education programmes that have contributed to the scientific understanding and management of diabetes and other metabolic disorders.	
Professor Patrick Moray Weller	For service to education and the community through research in the areas of political science and public administration, and to extending understanding of the role of executive government.	
Michael Robert Willesee	For service to the community as a supporter and promoter of the work of major social welfare, youth and health organisations, and to the media, particularly in the area of current affairs reporting.	
Emeritus Professor William David Williams	For service to science, particularly as a pioneer in and a major contributor to the body of world knowledge in the field of limnology, and as an advocate for the need for conservation of species and habitats and the environment.	
Sandra Lee Yates	For service to the community, particularly women's organisations, to the development and management of vocational education and training, and to the advertising industry.	

==== Military Division ====
Branch	Recipient	Citation	Notes
Army	Major General Peter Francis Haddad, AM	For distinguished service to the Australian Defence Force and the Australian Army as Support Commander (Army), Commander Support Australia and Commander Joint Logistics within the Defence Materiel Organisation.	
Army	Major General Peter Francis Leahy, AM	For distinguished service to the Australian Defence Force in senior command and staff appointments.	
Air Force	Air Vice-Marshal John Walter Kindler, AFC	For distinguished service to the Royal Australian Air Force as Air Commander Australia.	

=== Member (AM) ===
==== General Division ====
Recipient	Citation	Notes
Paris Aristotle	For service to the community through the development of an Australian network of services to assist refugees, particularly survivors of torture and trauma, and to assist their integration into the community.	
Michael James Ball	For service to the development and expansion of the advertising industry in Australia and internationally, and to the community through a range of organisations including the National Trust.	
Helen Hugo Barrett	In recognition of service to the community, particularly in relation to the women and children of the Solomon and Torres Strait Islands through the Anglican Board of Missions and the Mothers Union.	
Dr Noel Geoffrey Barton	For service to the mathematical sciences, particularly as a researcher, and by fostering links between Australian industry and the mathematics community.	
Susan Shirley Barton	For service to youth, particularly as founder and coordinator of the Lighthouse Foundation.	
Professor Robert Gordon Batey	For service to medicine and medical education in the fields of gastroenterology and hepatology, particularly through Hepatitis C research.	
Warwick Donald Bennet	For service to tourism, particularly through the development of regional and local tourism in New South Wales, and to the community of Tamworth.	
Dr Andrew Frederick Binns	For service to medicine and health education, particularly in the areas of lifestyle awareness and palliative care, and to the community of Lismore.	
Patricia Margaret Botto	For service to environmental management and land care in north Queensland through the promotion of sustainable land and water management practices.	
Emeritus Professor Ronald Drayton Brown	For service to chemistry and chemical research, particularly spectroscopic work on molecules, to education in the areas of curriculum development, teaching and as an administrator, and to the community.	
Sister Patricia Ruth Bundock	For service to the community, particularly as founder and coordinator of the St Martin de Porres Community at Wallangarra.	
Patricia Mary Burke	For service to the community through Caritas Australia and fundraising for the Lenten Project Compassion Appeal and emergency appeals.	
Professor Terence Richard Burke	For service to education and training, to educational leadership, and to the management of schools and literacy.	
Forrest Lloyd Butcher	For service to the community, particularly through the Royal Flying Doctor Service, and to wildlife conservation through the Kanyana Wildlife Rehabilitation Centre and captive breeding programmes for threatened species.	
June Alma Butcher	For service to wildlife conservation, particularly through the Kanyana Wildlife Rehabilitation Centre and captive breeding programmes for threatened species.	
Kenneth John Buttrum	For service to youth through the juvenile justice system, and the introduction of programmes aimed at breaking the juvenile crime cycle and assisting young people to integrate more successfully into the community.	
Sister Frances Mary Caine	For service to children with impaired hearing, particularly through the Aboriginal Hearing Health Programme in the Northern Territory, and to education and training.	
Norman Murdoch Carlyon	For service to the horse racing and breeding industries in Victoria, and to the community.	
Dr Bruce Northleigh Carter	For service to education as a principal, administrator and educator, particularly through Cranbrook School and professional educational bodies and forums.	
Professor Peter Charles Chandler	For service to the community through organisations supporting cultural activities, tourism and economic development, health and charities.	
Alan John Chatterton	For service to the community, particularly through the development of programmes and delivery of services through the Royal Blind Society of New South Wales.	
Professor Alan Stuart Coates	For service to medicine in the field of oncology, particularly through breast cancer research.	
Dr Patrick John Colgan	For service to dentistry as an administrator, particularly through the Australian Dental Association and the Australian Dental Council, and to the community.	
The Reverend James Cochrane Colville	For service to the community through the development of social welfare organisations and programmes in Tasmania.	
Margaret Jean Colville	For service to people with disabilities, particularly through Towers Incorporated, Toy Town Toy and Equipment Library, and the Down Syndrome Association of Tasmania.	
His Excellency David Miles Connolly	For service to the Parliament of Australia, to the development of superannuation policy reform, to international relations, and to the community.	
Dr Hugh David Cook	For service to medicine in the field of child and adolescent psychiatry, particularly as Chair of the Youth Suicide Advisory Committee.	
Dr John Lovick Corbett	For service to agricultural science, livestock grazing research and animal production, and to the community of Armidale Dumaresq.	
Laurie William Daley	For service to Rugby League football.	
Dr Margaret Lorraine Davy	For service to medicine, particularly in the field of gynaecological oncology through the development of systemised treatment plans, patient follow-up, data collection and organised clinical trials.	
Dr Hilda Marie Des Arts	For service to the community, particularly through the instigation of the national SeniorNet programme, Ipswich Hospice Care service and as a contributor to the work of Lifeline.	
The Reverend Father Leo Francis Donnelly	For service to the development of a broad range of social welfare and education programmes under the auspices of the Catholic Church, and to the community of Port Macquarie.	
Keith Leslie Eastman	For service to people with hearing impairments and to the development of education and services, particularly through the Western Australian Foundation for Deaf Children Inc.	
John Henry Everett	For service to the community through the Prince of Wales Medical Research Institute and other organisations in the areas of fundraising, management support, and raising awareness of the needs of charitable organisations.	
Robert John Frisken	For service to the development of education services through the Christian Community Schools movement throughout Australia, South East Asia and the Pacific.	
Arshak Catchatoor Galstaun	For service to the Armenian community, particularly through philanthropy and support for the Hamazkaine Arshak and Sophie Galstaun School.	
Dr James Richard Gannon	For service to veterinary science in the greyhound racing industry as an administrator, researcher and educator, and to the promotion of greyhound welfare issues.	
Dr Geoffrey George Gibbs	For service to the performing arts through the establishment, development and promotion of the Western Australian Academy of Performing Arts, and through professional associations.	
Stanley Martin Guilfoyle	For service to the community, particularly young people, through school and vocational education organisations, athletics and the Scout movement, and to professional organisations.	
David John Hamer	For service to the Parliament of Australia, to the recording of Australian military and political history as a researcher and writer, and to the community through arts organisations.	
Graeme John Hannan	For service to the community, particularly in the governance of the Macfarlane Burnet Centre for Medical Research and fundraising for its continuing development.	
Miranda Lyle Harrowell	For service to the promotion of Australian children's literature, particularly through Kids Own Australian Literature Awards (KOALA) and the preservation of the Children's Literature Research Collection of NSW.	
John Wilfred Hayne	For service to sport, particularly Rugby Union football, and to the community of the Illawarra region.	
Professor Alan Donald Hewson	For service to medicine and medical education in the field of obstetrics and gynaecology, particularly throughout the Hunter region.	
Ian William Hicks	For service to the community, particularly people with multiple sclerosis and their families through the development of a range of new and innovative services and the establishment of effective support groups.	
David Blyth Hill	For service to the media, particularly as an innovative contributor to the development of quality sports broadcasting.	
John Hamilton Hinde	For service to the film and media industry, particularly through the Australian Broadcasting Corporation.	
His Grace Bishop Youssef Hitti	For service to the Lebanese community as the spiritual leader and Head of the Maronite Catholic Church in Australia.	
Kaye Hogan	For service to the community through the Australian Red Cross, particularly through the development of first aid health and safety education programmes.	
Richard Norman Hoskins	For service to education as an administrator and educator, particularly through the Mona Vale Public School and Stewart House Preventorium, and to the community.	
Lolo Johanna Houbein	For service to literature as a writer and through assistance and encouragement of writers from non-English speaking backgrounds, to the welfare of refugees and migrants, and to the environment through Trees for Life.	
Dr Henry Edward Hudson	For service to neurosurgery, particularly as a pioneer of minimally invasive surgical techniques for spinal conditions.	
Robert George Hunt	For service to the finance and banking industries, particularly regional banking and the Community Bank Network, and to the community of Bendigo.	
Andrew Robert Inglis	For service to agriculture, particularly as a significant contributor to organisations involved in the promotion and development of Australia's grain industry.	
Dr Peter De Jersey	For service to medicine, particularly in the field of nephrology through the establishment and management of specialist renal services in north Queensland.	
Dr James Patrick Keaney	For service to medicine, particularly through the development of intensive care services in the Canberra region.	
Dr Patrick Timothy Keenan	For service to medicine in the field of orthopaedic sports surgery, and through the provision of overseas humanitarian medical treatment through the Australian Red Cross.	
Rex John Keily	Service to the community, particularly youth, through the South Australian Branch of Scouts Australia, Woodcroft Anglican College and World Vision, and to the automotive manufacturing industry.	
David Bradshaw Kellett	For service to sailing as a significant contributor to the administration of the sport in Australia and overseas and as a competitor.	
Dr Peter John Kennedy	For service to medicine, particularly in the fields of severe burns management and emergency medicine.	
Damian Thomas Keogh	For service to basketball as an administrator and competitor, and to the community.	
Alan Thomas Kerr	For service to the Australian and international communities through the programmes of the Scripture Union.	
Dr Robert Maclean Kibble	For service to veterinary science and animal welfare, particularly through the Delta Society Australia and the NSW Animal Welfare League.	
Alan George Launder	For service to sport as a volunteer coach, particularly in track and field athletic events, through junior athlete development and field event coaching.	
Emeritus Associate Professor John Frederick Leeton	For service to medicine, to the development of women's health, family planning and IVF services, and through ethical and regulatory debate in relation to assisted reproductive technology.	
John Kosmas Lesses	For service to industrial relations, particularly through the trade union movement, and to the Greek community of South Australia.	
Joan Austral Levick	For service to Australian literature as a novelist, poet and short story writer, and as a mentor to younger writers.	
Professor Miles Bannatyne Lewis	For service to architectural history, heritage protection and urban planning, particularly through policy development and professional organisations.	
Associate Professor Andrew Russell Lloyd	For service to medicine and to the community, particularly through the provision of specialist hepatitis services in prisons and research in the field of infectious diseases.	
Ida Gertrude Lloyd	For service to the community as a leading contributor to organisations providing support for people with visual impairments, youth, women and the environment.	
Emeritus Professor Brian Charles Low	For service to higher education in Australia, particularly through the development of the University of Technology, Sydney, and to the community.	
Emeritus Professor Eric Jeffrey Lund	For service to tertiary education, particularly through the development of the Technical and Further Education system in Victoria.	
Graeme Frank Lyall	For service to the Buddhist community in New South Wales, particularly through the promotion of Buddhism and fostering harmony between diverse ethnic groups, and involvement in education and welfare matters.	
William Macquarie Lyne	For service to the arts as an administrator and educator through the promotion of chamber music, Australian music and artists.	
Douglas Robert Mackie	For service to the community of Canberra through advisory and management committees of health, welfare, and business organisations.	
Councillor Jennifer Mavis McLellan	For service to local government, to the management of natural resources, particularly catchment management, and to community organisations supporting families in rural and remote areas.	
Robert William Millington	For service to land care in central Australia by assisting the pastoral industry and wider community to establish sustainable land management practices and rehabilitate damaged land.	
Patricia Mitzie Morris	For service to local government and to the community through safety, policing, crime prevention, welfare, service and sporting organisations, and as an advocate for indigenous communities.	
Penelope Morris	For service to the property and construction industries through a range of government organisations, industry associations and major corporations.	
Mary Jean Murdoch	For service to the community as a voluntary worker with a range of organisations concerned with health, school support, children's television, community information and conservation.	
Emeritus Professor Timothy George Murrell	For service to medicine and to medical education, particularly through the development of innovative courses of study in the fields of general practice and community medicine.	
Lady Neal	For service to the community, in particular as a supporter of the work of the Sydney City Mission and through a broad range of social welfare, service and youth groups in South Australia.	
Professor Hung Tan Nguyen	For service to engineering, particularly through biomedical technology research and education.	
Dr Bernard Nicholson	For service to medical administration, and to the conservation of medical heritage and history in South Australia.	
Ian John Nicol	For service to people with disabilities and their families through the support services offered by Hartley Lifecare, and to the community through the Anglican Church.	
Peter Edward Nolan	For service to youth, particularly through voluntary work associated with the establishment and operation of 'The Station', a residential facility of the Townsville Area Street Kids.	
Terrence William O'Callaghan	For service to the dairy industry through the promotion of the economic, environmental and corporate interests of dairy farmers, and to the community.	
John Mathew Opie	For service to the community, particularly through the establishment and development of the Bone Marrow Donor Institute, the Australian Bone Marrow Donor Register, the Cord Blood Bank, and an accommodation centre for patients and their families.	
His Honour Judge Peter Bowen Pain	For service to swimming, particularly in the areas of administration and the introduction of reforms in the structure of swimming in Australia.	
Leon Francis Paroissien	For service to the visual arts in Australia as a curator, administrator, arts manager and writer, and through support for innovation and excellence.	
George Leslie Piggins	For service to Rugby League football as an administrator, coach and player, and to the South Sydney community.	
Dr Glenda Joyce Powell	For service to geriatric medicine and aged care, particularly in the areas of diagnosis, management and rehabilitation, and as a teacher and mentor.	
Rosalie Pratt	For service to nursing education and curriculum development, and to the professional development of nurses, as an educator and author.	
Associate Professor Ronald Keith Pretty	For service to literature, particularly through the establishment of organisations to foster the promotion of Australian poetry.	
Dr Robert Arthur Richardson	For service to the wool industry through the Australian Wool Corporation, the Australian Realization Commission and Wool International.	
Dr Mary Theresa Rickard	For service to medicine through the integration of population-based screening for the early detection of breast cancer and the development of education programmes for health professionals.	
Fiori Rinaldi	For service to the judiciary and to the legal profession through the reportage of criminal law decisions in the Australian Criminal Law Reports series, and to the Italian community.	
Donald Leslie Roberts	For service to the accountancy profession, to the development of practical accounting systems and national accounting standards for primary producers, and to the community of Armidale.	
Dr David Errol Robinson	For service to science and medicine through the development of ultrasound technology and research into the clinical application of ultrasound in obstetrics.	
Alfred Edward Rofe	For service to the finance industry and the protection of the rights and interests of investors, particularly through the Australian Shareholders' Association and advisory bodies.	
Dr Margaret June Rosenthal	For service to the promotion and development of tertiary nursing education, and to the development of youth through Guides Australia (New South Wales).	
Desmond James Ryan	For service to the development of intellectual property law, and to the community.	
Dr Barry Richard Seeger	For service to people with physical disabilities through the development of rehabilitation engineering and assistive technology.	
Stephen Ross Shelmerdine	For service to the development and promotion of Australia's wine industry, particularly through the Winemakers' Federation of Australia, the Victorian Wine Industry Association and the Victorian Wineries Tourism Council.	
William Russell Slade	For service to the community through philanthropy in support of scientific organisations, to the development of the textile industry in Australia, and to sailing.	
Rolf Isak Stene	For service to commerce and industry, as a contributor to regional planning and economic development, and to the enhancement of business and employment opportunities in the south west region of Western Australia.	
Associate Professor Graeme John Stewart	For service to the development of health policy and medical education about HIV and AIDS, to medicine in the field of immunology, and to research on the genetics of multiple sclerosis.	
Rowan Darroch Story	For service to dentistry as an oral and maxillofacial surgeon, educator and administrator.	
John Foster Strachan	For service to the community through the Royal Society for the Prevention of Cruelty to Animals and other organisations and committees concerned with the welfare of animals, and to the Law Society of South Australia.	
Roger Charles Stubbs	For service to local government through affiliated professional associations, to urban planning, particularly through the development of environmental management policies, and to the community of Armadale.	
Shirley Ann Sutton	For service to the community through the development of palliative care services, particularly in the Australian Capital Territory, and the establishment of training for the volunteer programme.	
John Joseph Symond	For service to the mortgage industry in Australia, particularly the home finance sector, and to the community.	
Emeritus Professor George Szekeres	For service to mathematics and science, particularly as a contributor to education and research, to the support and development of the University of New South Wales Mathematics Competition and the Australian Mathematical Olympiad Team.	
Peter Gethyn Thomas	For service to the manufacturing industry, particularly the automotive industry, to education and training through leadership in the development of programmes to meet the needs of industry, and to the community.	
Beatrice Joy Thomson	For service to conservation and the environment, particularly the protection of whales and dolphins through Project Jonah, and to the community.	
Associate Professor My-Van Tran	For service to the Vietnamese community, and to the promotion of multiculturalism and Asian studies.	
Horace Neil Truscott	For service through a range of community and social welfare organisations in Canberra, and to international relations through the Australian Diplomatic Service and the Australasian Middle East Studies Association.	
Athina Venardos	For service to the community, particularly through fundraising and through a range of organisations supporting youth, migrants, women, the aged, and in the area of social justice.	
Winston Arthur Watts	For service to the dairy industry through the New South Wales Dairy Farmers Association, policy development, industrial representation, and advancement of the dairy farm sector.	
Raymond Henry Weinberg	For service to sport as an administrator, manager and coach, particularly through track and field athletics, and as an athlete.	
Wendy Margaret Weir	For service to women's cricket as an administrator, particularly through the New South Wales Women's Cricket Association.	
Dr Fred Talbot Widdop	For service to dentistry and to the improvement of dental health as an administrator, researcher and educator.	
Eve Lynette Williams	For service to arts administration and to the community, particularly through the National Gallery of Victoria, the Art Foundation of Victoria, and the donation to major Australian galleries of works by her late husband, Fred Williams, OBE.	
Dr Graham Knox Williams	For service to medicine as an obstetrician and gynaecologist, particularly as a clinician and mentor, and as an administrator.	
The Honourable Ian Wilson	For service to the community through a range of literature, health, social welfare and cultural organisations.	

==== Military Division ====
Branch	Recipient	Citation	Notes
Navy	Captain Stephen Harold Hooke	For exceptional service to the Royal Australian Navy as the Chief of Staff to Commander Northern Command, as Commander Australian Amphibious Forces, and as the Training Authority Maritime Warfare.	
Navy	Peter David Jones	For exceptional service to the Royal Australian Navy, particularly as Commanding Officer HMAS MELBOURNE and Director of Naval Strategy and Futures.	
Navy	Captain Davyd Rhys Thomas	For exceptional service to the Royal Australian Navy as a senior Naval Officer through personal commitment and dedication to professional excellence.	
Army	Major General Kevin Patrick Duggan	For exceptional service to the Australian Defence Force as the Judge Advocate General of the Australian Defence Force.	
Army	Colonel Stephen James Dunn	For exceptional service to the Australian Defence Force as the Commander Australian Contingent, Operation TANAGER in East Timor between November 2000 and August 2001.	
Army	Principal Chaplain Bruce Robert Horton	For exceptional service to the Australian Army in the field of Chaplaincy.	
Army	Lieutenant Colonel Roger Allen Joy	For exceptional service to the Australian Defence Force as Officer Commanding 103rd Signals and as Commanding Officer 1st Joint Support Unit.	
Army	Brigadier Patrick Francis McIntosh	For exceptional service to the Australian Army as Commandant of the Land Warfare Centre and as Commander 7th Brigade.	
Air Force	Wing Commander Stewart William Filmer	For exceptional service to the Royal Australian Air Force as the Chief Engineer and Commanding Officer Aerospace Engineering Squadron at the Aircraft Research and Development Unit.	
Air Force	Air Commodore Brian Edwin Plenty	For exceptional service to the Royal Australian Air Force as Officer Commanding Number 86 Wing.	
Air Force	Group Captain Gary Allan Thies	For exceptional service to the Royal Australian Air Force as Project Director Strike Reconnaissance and as Officer Commanding Strike Reconnaissance Systems Program Office.	

=== Medal (OAM) ===
==== General Division ====
Recipient	Citation	Notes
Dimitri James Agapitos	For service to the visual arts in Australia as a benefactor and fundraiser for public galleries, and by loaning and donating works of art to public institutions.	
Michael John Ahern	For service to the Australian greyhound racing industry, particularly through the New South Wales National Coursing Association, the Australian Greyhound Racing Association and the TAB Clubs Association.	
Robert Ernest Ahrens	For service to the community of Sheoak Log through a range of service, rural show, church and sporting groups.	
David Napier Aitken	For service to the administration of medicine, health and aged care, as a board member and Chairman of St Lukes Hospital in Potts Point.	
Murray Roy Alexander	For service to clay target shooting.	
James Fraser Anderson	For service to the community of Launceston.	
Anonymous	For service to the welfare of Vietnam veterans and their families, particularly in Western Australia.	
Margaret Muriel Appleby	For service to the community of Macarthur through Lifeline and the Rose Foundation.	
Dr Donald Barry Appleton	For service to medicine, particularly in the field of paediatric neurology, to the community through the Winston Churchill Memorial Trust, and to the Australian Defence Force as a clinician.	
Norman Lawrence Archard	For service to the community of Cohuna, particularly through the Cohuna Lions Club.	
Barbara Jean Armitage	For service to local government, to the reduction of water pollution through the establishment of Sydney Coastal Councils and BeachWatch, and to the community.	
Sylvia Meg Arthur	For service to the community of Sunnybank, particularly through the Australian Red Cross and Rotary.	
Pamela Ann Ashton	For service to women and children as an advocate for victims of domestic violence, particularly through the Lismore and District Women's Health Centre and the Far North Coast Domestic Violence Liaison Committee.	
Elwyn Aubrey Bailey	For service to the community of Glamorgan Spring Bay through local government.	
Joan Edna Ball	For service to lapidary, particularly through the Bankstown and Districts Lapidary Club.	
Edward James Barbour	For service to the community of Mundaring through the local volunteer bush fire brigade, St John Ambulance and the Hills Community Support Group.	
Lorraine Velma Bartling	For service to the community of Latrobe through a range of organisations in the areas of local government, health and aged care.	
Joseph Anthony Bartolo	For service to migrants, multicultural affairs and the Maltese community of Victoria.	
Robert Charles Baulch	For service to veterans and their families, particularly through the Oakey Sub-Branch of the Returned and Services League of Australia.	
Christopher Raymond Baxter	For service to environmental journalism through the promotion of wilderness activities and the protection of the environment.	
Laurie Heydon Beattie	For service to the community of Tamworth through local government and community organisations.	
Barry Malcolm Bell	For service to the community, particularly through Rotary International and for organising the collection of donated moneys and goods for use in developing countries.	
Lynton Franklin Bennett	For service to the housing industry, particularly the development of public housing standards and through professional associations.	
Joan Agnes Benson	For service to the performing arts as an actor, teacher, director, artistic director and administrator.	
Kenneth Victor Berris	For service to the community through music as a performer, conductor and orchestra leader.	
Alan John Berry	For service to hockey as a player and administrator.	
Neville Robert Bingham	For service to the community through emergency services, primary industry, rural shows and church organisations, and to the building industry.	
Paul Kenneth Bird	For service to sports administration, particularly through the Australian Paralympic Committee.	
Dorothy Ellen Birgan	For service to the community of Charters Towers through local government and organisations in the area of social welfare.	
Estelle Blackburn	For service to the community through investigative journalism in Western Australia.	
Nancy Joan Blake	For service to the communities of Ghoolendaadi and Willala, particularly through youth groups and the Country Women's Association.	
William Charles Bobbins	For service to the community of Raymond Terrace through sporting, ex-Service and social support groups.	
Venita Merle Bodle	For service to the health and welfare of the community of Perth, particularly people with disabilities.	
Leigh Alwyn Boneham	For service to veterans and their families, particularly through the Rye Sub-Branch of the Returned and Services League of Australia.	
Jack Bordujenko	For service to the community, particularly through a range of Catholic Church organisations and the Rotary Club of Townsville, and to the electricity industry in Queensland.	
William Hurtle Bowtell	For service to veterans and their families, and to the community of Redbank, particularly through emergency services and sporting organisations.	
Geraldine Anne Boylan	For service to the rural community of South Australia through the provision of pastoral care and counselling.	
Eric Richard Brand	For service to the wine industry, and to the communities of Coonawarra and Penola through Lions and other service organisations.	
Garry Max Braude	For service to the community through the North Shore Temple Emmanuel.	
Lina Thalassa Brennan	For service to the community of Kiama, particularly through Meals on Wheels and groups supporting the aged.	
Murray James Brennan	For service to the community of Maryland, particularly through working towards the improvement of facilities and services.	
Edgar Clive Britt	For service to horse racing as a jockey, commentator and journalist.	
Maurice John Brockwell	For service to the hospitality industry, and to the community, particularly through organisations in the areas of veterans services, education and motoring.	
The Reverend John Warren Brookfield	For service to the community, particularly in the areas of Aboriginal education and reconciliation, migrant assistance and the provision of housing for the disadvantaged.	
Councillor Malcolm Harold Brooks	For service to the community of Gosford, particularly through local government, and to the retail motor industry.	
Ronald William Brooks	For service to conservation and the environment, particularly through water catchment, salinity control and land reclamation.	
Martha Maria Brown	For service to the community of Orange, particularly through health and social welfare organisations.	
John Reginald Brummell	For service to the community, particularly through the Canberra Youth Haven Horticulture Project.	
Leslie Bunn	For service to the community of Mount Isa, particularly in the areas of education, assistance to the aged, and the Mount Isa Rodeo.	
Robert Thomas Burke	For service to the community of Wollongong through the Society of St Vincent de Paul.	
Anne Burton	For service to the community of Strathfield, particularly through the Catholic Church.	
Dr Gordon Sylvester Calnan	For service to the community of Ballina as a general practitioner and through the provision of medical services to a range of organisations.	
Jack Nikolas Calpis	For service to the community and to local government through the Sydney City Council.	
Dr William Frederick Cammack	For service to medicine and to the community of Penrith as a general practitioner.	
David John Campbell	For service to veterans and their families, particularly through the Campsie Sub-Branch of the Returned and Services League of Australia and through the Polish Ex-Servicemen's Association.	
Leon Campbell	For service to the community through Quota International.	
Bruno Cappelletti	For service to the Italian community, particularly through the Giuseppe Verdi Choral Society of Queensland, and to the Bar Association of Queensland as building services manager.	
Walter Carr	For service to the arts as a producer, director, educator and entertainer.	
Francis Albert Le Cerf	For service to the community of Bowraville, particularly through ex-Service organisations and the Lions movement.	
Edward Reginald Champness	For service to the district of Tatiara, particularly the farming community.	
Maurice James Chapman	For service to the community, particularly through the programmes of the Lions organisation.	
Philip Nivison Charley	For service to broadcasting in Australia and the Asia-Pacific region, and through education and training, particularly the development of technical and practical skills and professional attitudes and disciplines.	
Lucy Ellen Chataway	For service to youth, particularly through the Girls Brigade Queensland.	
Murray George Chessell	For service to the administration of gymnastics, particularly through the Australian Gymnastic Federation, and to the community.	
Dr Frank Tjie-Sien Chiu	For service to the Chinese community of South Australia.	
Stella Miu Ling Chow	For service to the Chinese community in the eastern region of Melbourne.	
William Ronald Clegg	For service to the community of Gunnedah through local government, and to the development of tourism in the area.	
Constance Mary Cloran	For service to the community of Marrickville through St Brigids Parish, particularly as a musician.	
Valerie Jean Cocksedge	For service to the community, particularly through the National Council of Women of Australia as Convenor for Home Economics and Consumer Affairs.	
Edward James Cohen	For service to the community, particularly through the job placement programme of the Salvation Army.	
Betty Laureen Collins	For service to lawn bowls as a player, administrator and umpire.	
William Robertson Collins	For service to music as a performer, educator, administrator and instrument maker.	
James Stanley Connor	For service to the communities of the Central Coast of New South Wales and Canberra through programmes supporting the aged and youth.	
Dr John James Cooney	For service to dentistry through administration and education, and to the community through service to the Spastic Centre of New South Wales.	
Margaret Ann Corby	For service to the community of Albury, particularly as a volunteer for health and social welfare groups.	
Claire Juanita Cornish	For service to the community as a fundraiser, particularly for the Cancer Care Lodge and the Lamrock Committee of the St George Hospital.	
Eric Holsbury Cox	For service to Rugby League football as a player, referee, coach and administrator.	
John Bernard Cox	For service to the community of Bassendean, particularly through local government.	
Edward Roger Cruse	For service to veterans and their families, particularly through the Shepparton Sub-Branch of the Returned and Services League of Australia.	
Helena Margaret Cullinan	For service to the community of Peterborough in the areas of local government, health care, women's affairs and sport.	
Maurice Mathew Cullis	For service to the community, particularly through the Society of St Vincent de Paul.	
Robert Leabon Curtis	For service to canine breeding and showing, particularly through the Royal New South Wales Canine Council and the Sydney Kennel Club.	
Robert George Curwen	For service to veterans and their families through the Waverley Sub-Branch of the Returned and Services League of Australia and the HMAS Warramunga Association.	
Ursula Noreen Davidson	For service to the preservation of Australia's military heritage through the New South Wales Branch of the Royal United Services Institute.	
Elizabeth Ann Davis	For service to the arts through puppetry.	
Errol Bruce Davis	For service to the arts, particularly through the establishment of the Sculpture Park at Macquarie University.	
Barbara Ann De Franceschi	For service to the community of Broken Hill, particularly in the area of multiculturalism.	
Ben Delmastro	For service to the community, particularly through the Pied Pipers for the Royal Children's Hospital.	
Francis Bernard Dennis	For service to the hospitality industry, and to rowing, particularly through the Hawthorn Rowing Club.	
Margaret Audrey Denton	For service to the heritage of Adelaide, particularly through voluntary work supporting the historical home of Carrick Hill.	
Colleen Rosita Digby	For service to the community of Port Hedland, particularly through the Pilbara Music Festival.	
Nancye Margaret Donaldson	For service to people with disabilities, particularly through the establishment of a support group for people who suffer from multiple sclerosis, Parkinson's disease and poliomyelitis, and through Quilts 2000.	
George William Dore	For service to the building industry as an administrator and educator.	
Margaret Eva Douch	For service to the community of the Bega district, particularly through the Bermagui Country Club and community health organisations.	
John Edward Downing	For service to the community of Kangaroo Island through sporting, historical, emergency services and aged care groups.	
Ray Courtenay Dowsett	For service to the community of Albany, particularly through equestrian, sporting, music and service organisations.	
Dr Richard Francis Drake	For service to medicine in the field of obstetrics and gynaecology, and to medical education.	
Dr John Harold Dugdale	For service to veterans through the Teachers Sub-Branch of the Returned and Services League of Australia.	
Alexander Dukin	For service to the Russian community, particularly through the construction of the St John the Baptist Russian Orthodox Church in Canberra.	
Irvine Webber Dunlop	For service to the development of the credit union movement.	
May Dwyer	For service to the community, particularly through the Australian Red Cross, the Cronulla Returned and Services League Women's Auxiliary and the Cronulla Sutherland District War Widows Guild.	
Margaret Lilly Eaton	For service to the community, particularly through the Christian Welfare Centre and the Young Women's Christian Association.	
John Louis Van Echteld	For service to the community of Chelsea through a range of organisations in the areas of sport, youth, heritage and local government.	
Roy Frank Eldridge	For service to the community, particularly through the Leichhardt Uniting Church Aged Network.	
Nicholas Euclid	For service to Rugby League football as a player, coach, administrator and referee, particularly in the development of referee accreditation policy.	
Keith Ewenson	For service to the community of Cardinia, particularly through local government and conservation groups.	
Dr Barbara Anne Fary	For service to secondary education in Victoria, particularly in the areas of curriculum and assessment.	
Maurice Valentine Fawcett	For service to the community through initiatives to enhance the delivery of services provided by Justices of the Peace.	
Mary Geddes Feez	For service to the community of Warwick, particularly in the areas of health and social welfare.	
The Rabbi Pinchus Feldman	For service to the Jewish community of New South Wales, particularly through the development of spiritual, educational and welfare facilities.	
Maree Bridget Filippini	For service to the Leukaemia Foundation of Queensland, particularly as a fundraiser.	
Thomas Patrick Fisher	For service to the community of Osborne Park, particularly through the Society of St Vincent de Paul.	
The Reverend Dr Laurence Peter Fitzgerald	For service to the Catholic Church, particularly for promoting inter-faith understanding, and as an educator.	
Rhonda Jeanette Fitzpatrick	For service to the community of Port Macquarie through the Scouting movement.	
Dr Sau-Ling Cecilia Fong-Huang	For service to the Chinese community, particularly through social welfare activities.	
Elsie Ford	For service to the community of Bulli-Woonona, particularly through the Australian Red Cross.	
Rose Courthope Fowler	For service to the community of Mandurah, particularly through the Australian Red Cross and Wearne House Auxiliary.	
Joan Mary Fox	For service to the community through the Scouting movement and sport, particularly swimming and water polo.	
Neville David Francis	For service to junior Rugby Union football in Queensland.	
Andy Freeman	For service to the community, particularly to the Jewish community of the inner city region of Sydney, and through the activities and programmes of Rotary International.	
Eric Walter Freeman	For service to sport, particularly cricket as a player, administrator and commentator.	
Ina Martha French	For service to basketball in Tasmania as an administrator and coach.	
Mary Galloway	For service to the social and religious welfare of the communities of Darkan, Mount Barker and Bunbury in Western Australia.	
Arthur William Garthon	For service to the communities of Hurstville and St George through health care, service and motoring groups.	
Raymond Christian Gee	For service to the community of Warringah, particularly through organisations supporting youth and sport.	
James Gemmell	For service to the administration and development of sport in the Mount Isa district, particularly judo and junior soccer.	
Valerie Jean Giese	For service to education through the Hawthorn campus of the University of the Third Age, and to the community.	
Captain James Alexander Gillespie	For service to maritime history and sailing, and to the community of Largs Bay through Rotary.	
Albert Clyde Goddard	For service to the community of Shenton Park, particularly youth and senior citizens.	
Charles Maxwell Gofton	For service to the community of Launceston, particularly through organisations supporting veterans and their families.	
Michael Reuben Gold	For service to education, particularly through fostering the multicultural population of Killara High School.	
Constance Doreen Goode	For service to the community of Port Pirie, particularly through the Australian Red Cross and Meals on Wheels.	
Maxwell Thomas Gordon	For service to the community through fundraising and volunteering, particularly for charities in the area of health.	
Joan Margaret Gorman	For service to youth through the Guiding movement, and to the community of Seymour, particularly through the Inner Wheel Club and Rotary International.	
Pastor Cecil William Grant	For service to the community by encouraging indigenous representation in the areas of conservation, tourism and education, through reconciliation activities and through the Wiradjuri Christian Development Ministries.	
Dr Franklin John Gray	For service to medicine as a surgeon, and to medical education.	
Olga Anne Greig	For service to veterans through the Belmont Sub-Branch of the Returned and Services League of Australia and the Western Australian Branch of the Royal Australian Army Nursing Corps Association.	
Leon Edward La Gruta	For service to music as a violinist, conductor and tutor, and to the community through organising concerts for charitable organisations.	
Patricia Margaret Haberle	For service to the communities of Kentish and Sheffield, particularly through welfare and education activities.	
Raymond Morris Hadley	For service to Rugby League football as a broadcaster, and to the community, particularly through fundraising for charitable organisations.	
Henry George Hall	For service to the community of Quairading, and to volunteer sea rescue.	
Valerie Janet Hamilton	For service to the community of Mackay, particularly in the areas of health and social welfare.	
Catharina Louisa Hampson	For service to the community through the arts, particularly as a sculptor.	
Mary Alma Hardman	For service to the community, particularly through welfare and social organisations, including International Training in Communication.	
Richard John Hargreaves	For service to the community, particularly through the Rotary Club of Indooroopilly.	
Kenneth Neville Harley	For service to veterans and their families as the honorary welfare officer and advocate for the 2nd/16th Infantry Battalion Association.	
Brian Colin Harper	For service to veterans and their families through the Tasmanian Branch of the Vietnam Veterans Association and the Longford Sub-Branch of the Returned and Services League of Australia.	
Cordula Hartwich	For service to the aged community of Unley, particularly through the Fullarton Lutheran Homes.	
Councillor Patricia Joy Harvey	For service to local government administration, to environmental planning, particularly in the area of water management, and to the community of Mosman.	
Grace Harvie	For service to the community of Berrigan through a range of women's, youth, health, church and ex-Service groups.	
James Ambrose Hatfield	For service to the community of Berowra, particularly through emergency services and environmental groups.	
Shea Mary-Anne Henderson	For service to the community through music as a teacher, choir leader and pianist, and through swimming administration.	
James Henry	For service to the Australian club industry, and to the wider community through fundraising activities for charitable organisations.	
John Ivan Herbert	For service to the community of Whyalla, particularly to the schools of the district.	
Arthur Henry Hewitt	For service to veterans and their families, particularly through the Naval Association of Australia and the Western Australian Division of the Navy League of Australia.	
Samuel Joseph Heys	For service to veterans and their families as an advocate for veterans entitlements and through the East Malvern Sub-Branch of the Returned and Services League of Australia.	
Gerald Vincent Hinton	For service to the community, particularly through the South Australian Division of Save the Children.	
Dr Nathan Hoffman	For service to mathematics education in Western Australia, and to the Jewish community.	
Muriel Jane Hoggart	For service to people with impaired hearing, particularly through the Geelong branch of Better Hearing Australia.	
Ronald John Hollands	For service to the community of Liverpool through local government and organisations supporting sport, health and tourism.	
Stanley Joseph Holmes	For service to veterans and their families, particularly through the Muswellbrook Sub-Branch of the Returned and Services League of Australia.	
Elizabeth Anne Holowell	For service to education, particularly as a teacher of violin at the Newcastle Conservatorium of Music.	
Robert John Homburg	For service to the community of the Barossa Valley through local government, musical and sporting organisations.	
Charles Alfred Osborne Horner	For service to the community of Bunbury through the promotion of safety at sea and through volunteer search and rescue organisations.	
Beres Jean Howard	For service to the community of Buderim, particularly through the Lioness Club and the local ambulance service.	
Robyn Howell	For service to the community through the preservation of Australian history, particularly in the fields of Aboriginal culture and genealogy.	
Austen James Hughes	For service to cricket, particularly as President of the Northern District Cricket Club.	
Margaret Seymour Hull	For service to people with impaired hearing, particularly through Self Help for Hard of Hearing People.	
Ian Sinclair Hunt	For service to the community through a range of church, health care, social welfare and aged care organisations.	
George Henry Hunter	For service to the community of Euroa through sporting, service and social welfare groups.	
Hedley Alexander Hunter	For service to the community of Berry, particularly through the Rotary Club of Berry Gerringong.	
John Robert Iacono	For service to education in Victoria through the Swinburne University of Technology and the Australian Catholic University.	
Graham Robert Jackson	For service to the community of Townsville through social welfare, service and health organisations, and to sport.	
William John James	For service to the community, particularly through sport on the south coast of New South Wales.	
Jennifer Japp	For service to the community of Hay through her contribution to the preservation of local heritage, tourism, the development of local arts and crafts, education and local development.	
Lindsay Alfred Jarvis	For service to the management of natural resources, particularly water, by encouraging agricultural practices that allow sustainable farm production and environmental outcomes, and to the rural community.	
William Owen Jones	For service to the community of Augusta, particularly through the Augusta Yacht Club, the Community Development Association and the Leewin Lions Club.	
Jennifer Jean Kain	For service to the community of Canberra through involvement with a range of musical groups and as an accompanist.	
Peter Pantelis Kalimnakis	For service to the Greek community of Melbourne and to veterans, particularly through involvement with the Australian-Hellenic War Memorial and the Shrine of Remembrance.	
Adjunct Professor George Kanarakis	For service to the community and to education, particularly through the study of Greek arts and culture.	
Bla Joseph Kardos	For service to the Hungarian community in Australia.	
Robyn Patricia Kelleher	For service to the community of Wagga Wagga as a social worker.	
Janet Forrest Kemp	For service to the Country Women's Association, and to the community of Holbrook.	
Effie Sophia Kerr	For service to the community of Bowral, particularly through the Bowral Vietnam Memorial Trust and the Highlands Garden Society.	
Anwar Ishaya Khoshaba	For service to the Assyrian community, particularly in the areas of social welfare and education, and to local government.	
Pamela Margaret Kirkham	For service to youth through the Guiding movement, and to people with acquired brain injuries.	
Karim Youssif Kisrwani	For service to the Lebanese community, particularly through charitable and social welfare organisations.	
Ivan John Klopcic	For service to the Slovenian community of the Hunter region, particularly in the area of aged care.	
Elwyn Harold Kotzur	For service to local government, and to the communities of Alma Park and Walla Walla through bushfire, church, school and sporting groups.	
Myra Catherin Lambert	For service to music, particularly as a teacher of singing.	
Councillor William Howard Larkin	For service to the community of Manningham, particularly through local government and health organisations.	
Dr Wilfred Nyunt Win Law	For service to medicine, particularly in the field of ophthalmology, and to the people of the Northern Territory.	
Raymond Wilfred Lawrance	For service to the community of York, particularly through local government.	
King Wing Lee	For service to the Chinese community of New South Wales, particularly through the Scouting movement.	
Lenti Lenko	For service to the Slovenian community, especially youth, as a musician.	
Kerin Joan Levy	For service to the community, particularly through the Camden Haven Music Festival and the Kendall National Violin Competition.	
Laurence Alfred Lewis	For service to music, particularly jazz, as a musician, composer, writer and mentor.	
Mary Frances Lilja	For service to the community as a foster parent, particularly of children with disabilities.	
Neville Ross Lindsay	For service to the welfare of veterans and their families, particularly through the War Veterans Homes Limited.	
Dr Jeanette Brentnall Linn	For service to the medical profession as a general practitioner, lecturer and health adviser, particularly in the field of geriatrics, and to the community through a range of education, church and women's groups.	
Despo Litis	For service to the Greek community in Western Australia as a supporter of sporting and women's groups.	
Evangelos Litis	For service to the Greek community in Western Australia as a supporter of sporting and cultural groups.	
Erik Shaip Lloga	For service to multicultural affairs, particularly the Albanian community through Operation Safe Haven.	
Shirley Helen Lloyd	For service to the community as a foster parent.	
Dr Edmund Dominic Loong	For service to medicine, particularly in the area of anaesthesia and related fields, and to the development of training for community resuscitation.	
Judith Anne Love	For service to the community through a range of charitable organisations in Western Australia, particularly those supporting youth.	
Aline Merle Lugton	For service to the community through the St Andrew's Cathedral Orchestra and the St Andrew's Cathedral School.	
Carmel Imelda Lutton	For service to music education, particularly through the Newcastle Conservatorium Foundation and Friends of the Conservatorium.	
Lois Margaret Mackiewicz	For service to the community of the Sunshine Coast through St John Ambulance Australia.	
Harold George Mackrell	For service to the community of Fitzroy, particularly through the provision of welfare services to aged and disadvantaged people, and to overseas students through the provision of support services.	
Fiona Thyne Maclachlan	For service to the environment, and to the community.	
Edwin Sydney Madigan	For service to the community through the Harbord Diggers Memorial Club and support for the Manly Hospital.	
John Frederick Madigan	For service to the community of Adelaide through the cultural exchange programmes of Rotary International, and to the Guide Dogs Association of South Australia and the Northern Territory.	
Dr Raman Perumpillil Marar	For service to the Indian community, particularly through the Federation of Indian Associations of Victoria.	
Emilia Verbina Markakis	For service to the Romanian community through cultural, social and educational activities.	
Brian Keith Marsland	For service to sport and recreation, particularly through the Royal South Australian Bowling Association.	
Enid Florence Maskey	For service to veterans and their families, particularly through the Sanadakan Memorial Foundation.	
Desmond Stanley Mathews	For service to ballroom dancing, particularly Latin and New Vogue, as a teacher and coach.	
Bruce William McAvaney	For service to sports broadcasting, and to the community through charitable and sporting organisations.	
Joyce Elaine McConnon	For service to the community of Devonport, particularly through Meals on Wheels, the Society of St Vincent de Paul and the Catholic Women's League.	
Marie Isabel McCulloch	For service to the communities of Latrobe and Port Sorell, particularly through the promotion of the region as a tourist destination.	
Ross Raymond McDonald	For service to the community of Edwardstown, particularly through Rotary.	
Daniel Frederick McDowell	For service to the communities of Bayswater and Boronia through Rotary and the Church of Christ, and to children through Camp Quality.	
Roderick Graham McFarlane	For service to lawn bowls, particularly through the Australian Capital Territory Bowls Association.	
Peter Muir McFarline	For service to journalism, particularly sports journalism.	
Dr Gayle Marie McInerney	For service to the provision of health care in the Auburn area, and to the development of emergency and disaster medical service strategies.	
Douglas John McIver	For service to local government, and to the community of Mundubberra.	
George Milton McKean	For service to the community of Yarram through assisting in the maintenance of community assets and through Lions, and to the sport of woodchopping.	
Shirley Margaret McKerrow	For service to politics through the National Party of Australia, and to the community.	
Colonel Robert Allan McLean	For service to the community of Wodonga through a range of health and welfare organisations.	
Dr Arthur Geoffrey McManis	For service to thoracic medicine and public health through the treatment and prevention of respiratory diseases, particularly tuberculosis.	
Robert James McPherson	For service to the community, particularly through the Lower Clarence Scottish Association.	
Michael George Meerwald	For service to the community of Cockburn, particularly through Granary House and the Society of St Vincent de Paul.	
Dr Gerard Arie Meijer	For service to the community, particularly through health care organisations.	
Margaret Anne Meister	For service to the community of Port Macquarie as a contributor to the establishment of the Hastings Limited Care Dialysis Centre.	
John Alexander Meldrum	For service to the community through the Lady Musgrave Trust, Diabetes Australia Queensland and the Real Estate Institute of Queensland.	
Brien William Mendham	For service to people with disabilities, particularly through the Northern Area Recreation Association.	
Janice Patricia Mendham	For service to people with disabilities, particularly through the Northern Area Recreation Association.	
Joseph Anthony Mercieca	For service to veterans through the Ramsgate Returned and Services League Memorial Club.	
Ralph Brian Metcalfe	For service to local government, particularly through the Greater Taree City Council.	
Christos Michalis	For service to the Greek community of the Australian Capital Territory, especially through the Hellenic Club of Canberra, and as a philanthropist.	
Bruce Robert Miles	For service to the law, particularly through the New South Wales Aboriginal Legal Service.	
Alan William Mill	For service to veterans and their families, particularly through welfare activities of the Glen Waverley Sub-Branch of the Returned and Services League of Australia.	
John Miller	For service to the community of Gilgandra through financial support to the Gilgandra Museum and Historical Society and the Gilgandra Golf Club.	
John Campbell Miller	For service to the development of the community of Barcaldine through local government, sporting and tourism groups.	
William Joseph Moffatt	For service to veterans through the administration of the 460 Squadron (Royal Australian Air Force) Association.	
Karen Diane Morrissey	For service to the community of Mount Magnet, particularly through the recording of the history of the area.	
Patricia June Mortlock	For service to the welfare of veterans and their families, particularly through the Queanbeyan Returned and Services League of Australia Women's Auxiliary.	
Francis Dermot Mott	For service to the communities of Broadmeadows and Glenroy through a range of organisations in the areas of health, local government, youth and sport.	
John Edmund Mueller	For service to the community of Wagga Wagga through support for health, social service and sporting groups.	
Annette Grace Mulliner	For service to the welfare of veterans and their families through the New South Wales Branch of the Returned and Services League of Australia.	
Helen Beatrice Murphy	For service through voluntary organisations that assist in improving the lives of people in the community.	
Robert George Murray	For service to the community as a fundraiser for the Oncology Department of the Children's Hospital at Westmead.	
Margaret Anne Murtagh	For service to nursing, particularly in the Mount Isa region, through the provision of postnatal support and health care for babies and children.	
Elizabeth Mary Nagle	For service to medical patients through the Australian Red Cross and the Peter MacCallum Cancer Institute.	
Lawrence John Nauschutz	For service to the community of Bargara, particularly through youth, educational and sporting groups.	
Edward John Neesham	For service to water polo through the Melville Water Polo Club and the Western Australian Water Polo Association.	
Barry Clyde Nelson	For service to Rugby League football, particularly through the Bulldogs League Club.	
The Venerable Philip John Newman	For service to the community through the Anglican Church of Australia, to refugee relief, and to people overcoming drug and alcohol addictions.	
Barbara Lesley Newton	For service to the community as an advocate for gender equity and equal opportunity through work in the legal profession, and through Zonta International and the Cancer Self-Help Group.	
Eric Joseph Nicholls	For service to fundraising for charitable organisations in Brisbane through the Breakfast Creek Cricket Club.	
Dorothy Iris Nolan	For service to the Scouting movement, particularly in the Hoadley region.	
Frank Conrad Norton	For service to the Bronte Surf Life Saving Club.	
John Windermere Nott	For service to the community of Newcastle, particularly through the activities of the Lions Club of Newcastle.	
Constance Williamina Offler	For service to visual arts, particularly the promotion of art in society.	
Robert William Oke	For service to youth, particularly through the Scouting movement.	
Frederick Orreill	For service to the community, particularly through Meals on Wheels in Crows Nest, and to sporting groups.	
Walter Errol Osborne	For service to youth, particularly through the Scouting movement in New South Wales.	
Norman Owens	For service to education and to youth, particularly through the establishment of Australian Business Week.	
Philip Frederick Owens	For service to the community of Bunbury, particularly through the Society of St Vincent de Paul, Rotary and the Scouting movement.	
Constantine Papadopoulos	For service to the Greek community of Victoria, particularly as a contributor to the establishment of educational and social organisations.	
Roma Joy Parker	For service to the communities of Ascot and Clovelly Park, particularly through the Community Care organisation.	
Diane Paterson	For service to the nursing profession, particularly through the development of tertiary curriculum, the promotion of best practice, and improvements in aged care.	
Bruce Peake	For service to the community, particularly youth through the Young Men’s Christian Association.	
Joaquin Artacho Peralta	For service to the community, particularly through the promotion of the Spanish language and culture in South Australia.	
Dr Elizabeth May Perkins	For service to the arts, particularly through involvement in theatre projects, the publication of research, reviews and creative writing, and through teaching, especially students from non-English speaking backgrounds.	
Betty Edith Perry	For service to the community of Sydney through a range of social welfare organisations.	
Elly Peters	For service to the community of Illawarra, particularly people with mental illnesses and their carers.	
Christopher Phang	For service to the community, particularly through the Asian Australian Artists Association.	
William Harry Phillips	For service to veterans and their families as Secretary of the 29th Australian Infantry Brigade Association, as a military historian, and as Chaplain to ex-Service organisations.	
Elaine Lilias Piggott	For service to the community, particularly through Soropotimist International, and to the motel accommodation industry in Tasmania.	
Gwyn Hanssen Pigott	For service to the arts as a ceramic artist and teacher of the craft.	
Robert Lancelot Pinkerton	For service to lawn bowls, particularly through the Camden Bowling Club and the Southern Tablelands District Bowling Association.	
Tomislav Milutin Popovic	For service to the Serbian community of Adelaide.	
John Frank Porter	For service to the community of East Gippsland through the local water board and a range of service, sporting and ex-Service organisations.	
Dr Muriel Lylie Porter	For service to the community as an advocate for women's and social justice issues, and to the Anglican Church of Australia.	
Colin Richard Prowse	For service to the preservation of community history through the Sovereign Hill Museums Association.	
Beryl Purdy	For service to local government, and to the community of Maitland through cultural, arts, service, church and sporting groups.	
Brian George Pym	For service to the community of Rockleigh and district, particularly through cultural, arts, service, church and sporting groups and local government.	
Susan Gail Rappell	For service to nursing, particularly through innovative leadership and hospital administration.	
Earle Rawlings	For service to court reporting, particularly through the introduction of technology to assist the transcription process, and to the community of Aspley through service, youth and sporting organisations.	
Muriel Read	For service to the community of Tweed Heads, particularly through the local branch of the United Hospital Auxiliaries of New South Wales.	
Keith Redman	For service to the communities of Penrith and Mulgoa, particularly through rural fire service organisations.	
David John Reed	For service to the community of Perth, particularly through the Passages Resource Centre.	
Henry Edward Regan	For service to the community of the Shoalhaven, particularly veterans and their families and youth.	
Malcolm George Reid	For service to sport, particularly through the Temora Australian Football Club, as an administrator, coach and competitor.	
Ronald James Reid	For service to tennis as a player and administrator.	
Mavis Helen Reynolds	For service to the community of Penrith, especially through the initiation and organisation of arts projects, and for service to other volunteer groups.	
Dr Peter Leggett Reynolds	For service to recording community history, especially the architectural heritage of the Leichhardt area.	
Alan Henry Rice	For service to the development of the commercial facilities in Oakleigh, and to the community, particularly through the Lions Club of Oakleigh.	
Simon James Rice	For service to the law and to the community through the Law Foundation of New South Wales, and for commitment to the provision of legal assistance and advice to people who are economically and socially vulnerable.	
Robert William Richardson	For service to the welfare of veterans and their families, and to the community.	
Thomas Stanley Richmond	For service to youth through education and cricket, and to researching the history of Hornsby.	
Audrey Phyllis Robinson	For service to the communities of Maclean and Yamba, particularly through Meals on Wheels and a range of ex-Service, educational, welfare, health and sporting bodies.	
Dr Ian Keith Robinson	For service to the community of Beenleigh as a general practitioner.	
Andr Marston Roller	For service to education in South Australia, particularly through the organisation and promotion of the Tournament of Minds competition.	
Jennifer Ann Rollo	For service to the community through the Cornelia de Lange Syndrome Association of Australia.	
Barbara Anne Romalis	For service to the arts and crafts, particularly to artists of the community of Campbelltown.	
Sidney Robert Rood	For service to the community of Bega through the local fire brigade and public education programmes regarding fire issues.	
Barry Darcy Rose	For service to harness racing, and to local government.	
Edward William Rose	For service to the community through the New South Wales State Emergency Service and through the Steam Tram and Railway Preservation Society.	
Winnifred Rosemarie Rosser	For service to the heritage of the Australian Capital Territory, particularly through the Friends of the National Museum of Australia.	
Leslie Joseph Rountree	For service to veterans and their families through the Returned and Services League of Australia.	
Iris Grace Rowtcliff	For service to the community, particularly through the War Widows Guild of Australia in Western Australia.	
Neville Edwin Rule	For service to the community of The Gap through voluntary organisations, particularly associated with the care of elderly people.	
Geoffrey Joseph Sam	For service to the health care industry in South Australia.	
Barry Stuteville Sanders	For service to the water industry, particularly through the Australian Water Association, and to tennis.	
Yogeswaran Sathianathan	For service to the multicultural community of the Northern Territory.	
Darryl Richard Saw	For service to the community of Calliope through emergency services, sporting and social welfare groups.	
Marjorie Gay Schulze	For service to local government, and to the community of Marion, particularly through health care and human service organisations.	
John Edgar Scoble	For service to the community of Parkes and district, particularly through local government, Rotary, the Uniting Church and the Central West Parkinsons Disease Research Group.	
The Reverend Brian John Seers	For service to the Anglican Church of Australia, to ex-Service associations, and to the community, particularly as a foster carer.	
Michael Servos	For service to the Royal Australian Regiment Association, particularly for involvement in the Royal Australian Regiment National Memorial Walk in Enoggera.	
William Mansfield Sexton	For service to the community of Cairns, particularly the aged through the Woodward Retirement Village and the District Board of Benevolence in Carpentaria.	
William Stuart Shaw	For service to the community of Toowoomba through civic celebration, welfare, service and sporting groups.	
Jean Sheehy	For service to the community as a fundraiser and supporter of the arts, education and women's bowls.	
Dr John Edward Sheehy	For service to the community as a general practitioner, and as a benefactor and fundraiser for the arts and education.	
Bennie Oldham Sheldon	For service to youth, particularly through the Scouting movement, to veterans and their families, and to charitable organisations.	
Lessa Margaret Siegele	For service to the art of quiltmaking as a teacher, and to the community through fundraising.	
Elizabeth Penfold Simpson	For service to the community through fundraising for charitable organisations, especially in the area of health.	
Frederick Gordon Skeels	For service to veterans and their families, particularly through the Ex-Prisoner of War Association in Western Australia and the Western Australian Section of the Naval Association of Australia.	
Peter Michael Skrzynecki	For service to Australian multicultural literature, particularly as a poet.	
George Valentine Smith	For service to the community of Weston, especially in the areas of heritage, restoration and maintenance of public areas and through the justice system.	
Irene May Smith	For service to the nursing profession and the treatment of the ulcerative skin disease Mycobacterium ulcerans.	
Keith Leslie Smith	For service to veterans and their families, particularly through the 7th Australian Division AIF Association.	
Kelvin Henry Smith	For service to the community, particularly through St John Ambulance Australia.	
Lorna Janet Smith	For service to the community of Bathurst, particularly through the Australian Red Cross.	
Valda Rose-Marie Smith	For service to the community of Bunbury, and to youth, particularly through the Guiding movement.	
Patricia Ann Smytherman	For service to people with disabilities and their carers through the Tatiara Employment Support Service Inc and the Carer Support and Respite Centre Inc.	
John Derek Snowdon	For service to the community of Busselton.	
Robert McGregor Stacey	For service to the community of Jamestown, particularly through the Jamestown and District Homes for the Aged.	
David Maurice Stack	For service to the regional community of Taree, to local government, and to the legal profession.	
Timothy John Stack	For service to the community of Taree, particularly through the Taree and District Eisteddfod Society.	
Alan Frank Statton	For service to sports administration, particularly Australian Rules football.	
Jeffery John Stead	For service to the indigenous community, particularly in the area of land rights, and through the preservation and recording of rituals, rites, dreamings and traditions.	
John Patrick Stephen	For service to the plumbing industry, particularly in relation to technical, education and professional development.	
Jean Betty Stephens	For service to the community of Hawkesbury-Nepean, especially through the Australian Red Cross and local history, church and health groups.	
Murray Charles Stone	For service to people undergoing open heart surgery, through Heartbeat South Australia, and for voluntary hospital work.	
Janet Irene Storer	For service to the health of mothers and children, particularly as a lactation consultant.	
Ronald Thomas Strong	For service to surf lifesaving as an administrator and through promotion of the movement.	
Nanette Mary Stubbs	For service to people with hearing impairments, particularly through the Victorian Federation of Parents of Hearing Impaired Children.	
Lieutenant Colonel Garth Osmond Suthers	For service to the welfare of veterans and their families through a range of ex-Service organisations.	
Alan Francis Swanson	For service to music in the Hunter Valley region, particularly pipe music, both as a tutor and performer.	
Shirley Joyce Sweeney	For service to dance, particularly through the development of the Khorobushka cultural dance syllabus.	
Robert Stanley Swif	For service to the youth of Canberra, particularly through Burgmann College at the Australian National University.	
Alan Bruce Swinton	For service to the community of Tasmania, particularly through the Royal Life Saving Society and social welfare organisations.	
Shirley Gertrude Symons	For service to the community of Adelaide, particularly through the Order of St John of Jerusalem, the Australian Red Cross and the Good Neighbour Council of South Australia.	
James Robert Tasker	For service to conservation and the environment, particularly through the National Parks Association of New South Wales, and to the community through the restoration of a significant historical building in Gulgong and through the Workshop Arts Centre at Willoughby.	
Alan Henry Taylor	For service to maritime engineering, and the protection of the marine environment.	
Henry Datfuming Thai	For service to the Chinese community of Victoria, particularly through aged, social welfare and health care groups.	
Frederick George Thomas	For service to the community of Williamstown, particularly through the Williamstown Hospital.	
Ian Herbert Thomas	For service to the newspaper industry in Victoria, and to the community of Pakenham.	
Neville Gordon Thomas	For service to people with disabilities in Western Australia through the Volunteer Fisheries Liaison Officer programme.	
William Albert Thornton	For service to the community, particularly through Rotary International and Probus.	
Betty Vera Thorp	For service to the community through the Royal Commonwealth Society of South Australia, and to Probus.	
Lorelle Vivier Toms	For service to nursing, particularly in the area of cardiac rehabilitation.	
Albert Roger Tonkin	For service to the community of Moora through local government and participation in a range of sporting, heritage and primary industry organisations.	
Hung Viet Tran	For service to the Vietnamese community of Queensland, particularly through the promotion of multiculturalism and harmony between different ethnic groups.	
Rosalie Trower	For service to people with intellectual disabilities, especially through Kew Cottages.	
The Reverend Selwyn John Tully	For service to the community, particularly through the New Life Ministry at Street Level Incorporated.	
Carlyle Andrew Turner	For service to children as a toy maker for charitable organisations.	
Brian John Tyquin	For service to sailing, particularly through the Yachting Association of New South Wales.	
Kay Ormonde Valder	For service to the community, particularly as an Official Visitor with the New South Wales Department of Corrective Services.	
Graeme Frederick Vendy	For service to the community of Ballarat, particularly through involvement in music education and the performing arts.	
Lance Edward Vernon	For service to the community of Gilgandra through the provision of emergency services.	
Linda Vipont	For service to the communities of Maribyrnong and Footscray, particularly through the Australian Red Cross, and to the Melbourne Ladies Pipe Band.	
Stavros Vlahos	For service to the community through the Greek Orthodox community of New South Wales, the Hellenic Club of New South Wales and the Hellenic Chamber of Commerce.	
Franc Vodusek	For service to the communities of Cobram and Yarrawonga through support for district health facilities and sporting organisations and through the Old Convent Restoration and Preservation Fundraising Committee.	
Elizabeth Frances Wales	For service to the community of Young through voluntary work and fundraising efforts on behalf of charitable organisations.	
Betty June Waller	For service to people with intellectual disabilities, particularly as an advocate for the establishment of education and support services.	
Elizabeth Anne Wallman	For service to the heritage of South Australia, particularly through the National Trust of South Australia and Ayers House.	
Gregory Alexander Walsh	For service to the legal profession, and to the community, particularly through the provision of pro bono legal services.	
Shannon James Warnest	For service to the wool industry as a world champion shearer, and to the training of shearers.	
John Norman Warren	For service to soccer as a player, coach and sports journalist.	
Kenneth Wells	For service to the community of Whyalla, particularly through assistance to senior citizens and people with disabilities.	
Barbara Fay Wesley	For service to sports administration in Tasmania, particularly badminton.	
William Joseph Weston	For service to the community, particularly as an advocate for older people.	
Francis Joseph Whelan	For service to the community of Lilydale, particularly through the Lilydale Country Fire Authority.	
Neville Albert Whiffen	For service to chemical engineering and industrial chemistry.	
Audrey Suzanne White	For service to music as an administrator and educator.	
Donald White	For service to the community through the Rotary Club of Guildford.	
Agnes Marquez Whiten	For service to the community, particularly in the areas of women's affairs and multiculturalism.	
Betty Maud Williams	For service to the community through South East Palliative Care.	
Leslie Arthur Wilson	For service to the community, particularly through the fundraising initiatives of the Breakfast Creek Cricket Club.	
Dr William Richard Wilson	For service to the community of the Northern Territory, particularly through the Australian Red Cross, historical organisations, and volunteer firefighting.	
Barry William Wilton	For service to the community through the Keep Australia Beautiful Council, and to the promotion of animal welfare through the New South Wales Animal Welfare League.	
Robert Paul Winther	For service to the welfare of veterans and their families, and to the community of Banyule.	
Councillor Warren Walter Woodley	For service to local government in Tamworth, and to the community, particularly through Australian Cities Against Drugs.	
John Anthony Woods	For service to veterans and their families through the 2/16th Battalion Association.	
Jeanne Lorita Worth	For service to veterans and their families, particularly through the War Widows Guild of Australia.	
Joseph Wright	For service to the community of Wollongong, particularly to senior citizens.	
Isabella Jessie Wye	For service to swimming, and to the community through sporting organisations.	
Dr Robert Deighton Yarrow	For service to the community of the Illawarra district through sports medicine and sporting organisations.	
Marjory Forsyth Yeates	For service to the community of Coffs Harbour through local government and through environmental and cultural groups.	
Barry Alan Young	For service to pharmaceutical research and development, particularly relating to diabetes.	
Katie Marie Young	For service to the Chinese community, particularly through the fostering of relations between Australia and China.	
Jone Zalkauskas	For service to the Lithuanian community through the Melbourne Lithuanian Women's Welfare Association.	

==== Military Division ====
Branch	Recipient	Citation	Notes
Navy	Chief Petty Officer Robert Bruce Lee	For meritorious service to the Royal Australian Navy in the field of ANZAC Class marine engineering maintenance and operation.	
Army	Warrant Officer Class One Glenn Anthony Cochrane	For meritorious service to the Australian Army in the field of Unconventional Infantry Leadership and Training.	
Army	Warrant Officer Class One David Andrew Harling	For meritorious service to the Australian Army as the Regimental Sergeant Major of the 2nd Cavalry Regiment and the 1st Brigade.	
Army	Warrant Officer Class One Ian Kilgour	For meritorious service to the Australian Army as the Regimental Sergeant Major of 7th and 4th Field Regiments, and in instructor appointments at the School of Artillery and the Army Promotion Training Centre.	
Army	Warrant Officer Class One Hendrick Rappard	For meritorious service to the Australian Army as the Regimental Sergeant Major 1st Military Police Battalion, Army Military Police Training Centre and the Peace Monitoring Group, Bougainville.	
Air Force	Warrant Officer Kim Michelle Samin	For meritorious service to the Royal Australian Air Force as a Signals Operator.	

== Meritorious Service ==
=== Public Service Medal (PSM) ===
Service	Recipient	Citation	Notes
Commonwealth	Timothy John Albers	For outstanding public service to the Australian veteran community, particularly in ensuring veterans have ready access to relevant information and in developing the Veterans Home Care project in South Australia.	
Commonwealth	David William Borthwick	For outstanding public service, particularly in the development and progression of the governments economic policies.	
Commonwealth	Ruth Mary Dodd	For outstanding public service through her contribution to major national mapping and atlas programmes.	
Commonwealth	Dr Brian Stanley Fisher	For outstanding public service in the field of agricultural and resource policy development.	
Commonwealth	Dr James Russell Hagan	For outstanding public service in the development and management of the Goods and Services Tax Start-Up Assistance Office.	
Commonwealth	Dr Beverly Hart	For outstanding public service in improving telecommunication services to people living in isolated regions of Australia.	
Commonwealth	Ian McPhee	For outstanding public service to public sector accounting and auditing, and the development of industry accounting standards.	
Commonwealth	James Gardner Murray	For outstanding public service in the development and promotion of animal health and food safety standards.	
Commonwealth	Ross Phillip Norton	For outstanding public service particularly for his support in the maintenance of Australia's border integrity and the development of people movement management capabilities in South East Asia.	
Commonwealth	Dr Gary Phillip Richards	For outstanding public service, particularly in the development of Australia's leading capability in the accounting of greenhouse gas emissions and sustainable land management.	
Commonwealth	Judith Kathryn Walker	For outstanding public service to public broadcasting and media law.	
Commonwealth	Raymond Kenneth Watt	For outstanding public service in the development of information technology for the social security sector.	
Commonwealth	Neil Donald Westbury	For outstanding public service in the provision of policy advice and service delivery to the indigenous community.	
Commonwealth	Paul White	For outstanding public service in the development of innovative and effective Centrelink service options for Australians residing outside metropolitan areas.	
Commonwealth	Shirley Marion Willis	For outstanding public service in the improvement and promotion of sports opportunities for women, children, indigenous and disabled Australians.	
New South Wales	Kenneth Reginald Barker	For outstanding public service in public sector financial management.	
New South Wales	Dorothy Jean Bartel	For outstanding public service through the health system in New South Wales.	
New South Wales	Graeme John Bullivant	For outstanding public service in the New South Wales Treasury.	
New South Wales	Mary Philomena Gray	For outstanding public service to the Centenary of Federation Celebrations in New South Wales.	
New South Wales	Helen Irene Moir	For outstanding public service to the dairy industry in New South Wales.	
New South Wales	Jill Moorhouse	For outstanding public service with the Coonamble Shire Council.	
New South Wales	Donald James Murphy	For outstanding public service in the field of Government contracting.	
New South Wales	Brian Trevor Petschler	For outstanding public service with the Kiama Council.	
New South Wales	Mark Anthony Ronsisvalle	For outstanding public service to financial and economic policy.	
New South Wales	Gregory Leonard Skelly	For outstanding public service to children and foster carers.	
New South Wales	Peter Stanley Wyborn	For outstanding public service in The Rocks area of Sydney.	
Queensland	David Ashley Allan	For outstanding contribution to the public service in the field of vocational education and training.	
Queensland	Peter Stewart Ogilvie	For outstanding public service in the field of conservation in Queensland.	
Queensland	Babette Alice Perina	For outstanding public service as a community librarian within local government.	
Queensland	Janette Whitby	For outstanding public service to community health and remote area nursing.	
Queensland	Robin Marion Zakharov	For outstanding public service in the field of tenant housing.	
South Australia	David Powell Ellis	For outstanding public service and innovation in the field of planning.	
South Australia	Debra Martin Kay	For outstanding public service in assisting children and students with significant health care needs to access education.	
South Australia	Robert Anthony Laws	For outstanding public service to Australia's petroleum industry.	
South Australia	Anthony John Zammit	For outstanding public service in the fields of book conservation and heritage preservation.	
Victoria	Jennifer Mary Bennett	For outstanding public service to administration of the Sunraysia Institute of TAFE.	
Victoria	Alan George Bryant	For outstanding public service to Secondary Education, particularly at Cobden Technical School.	
Victoria	William David Johnson	For outstanding public service to the environmental management of Melbourne Ports.	
Victoria	Graem William Kelly	For outstanding public service to hospital administration, particularly at Robinvale Health Services.	
Victoria	Judith Jane Kelso	For outstanding public service to health care policy, particularly the development of building and care standards of aged care facilities.	
Victoria	Roderick Lionel Nicholls	For outstanding public service to local government, particularly in the Golden Plains Shire and the former Shire of Grenville.	
Victoria	Hannelore Lala Prvan	For outstanding public service to hospital administration, particularly through innovations in the area of coordination of organ transplant teams.	
Victoria	Mary Carmel Stewart	For outstanding public service to adult multicultural education services.	
Victoria	Toni-Louise Van Hamond	For outstanding public service to mental health services, particularly through the introduction of protocols for police and ambulance services.	
Western Australia	Jack Busch	For outstanding public service through the implementation of government policy with the Crown Law Department and the Ministry of Sport and Recreation.	
Western Australia	Edwin Walter Piper	For outstanding public service to local government, particularly in financial management.	

=== Australian Police Medal (APM) ===
Service	Recipient	Notes
Federal	Superintendent Robert Frederick Donovan	
Federal	Federal Agent Kenneth Patrick Hardiman	
New South Wales	Superintendent Peter John Butcher	
New South Wales	Detective Superintendent John Robert Heslop	
New South Wales	Superintendent Geoffrey Richard Owens	
New South Wales	Chief Inspector Robert John Redfern	
New South Wales	Superintendent Allan Frederick Tayler	
Victoria	Sergeant Karl Michael David	
Victoria	Inspector Frederick Kenneth Johansen	
Victoria	Detective Senior Sergeant Christopher John O'Connor	
Victoria	Senior Constable Mark Kevin Townsend	
Victoria	Sergeant John Douglas Woodstock	
Queensland	Sergeant Gary Noel Eddiehausen	
Queensland	Superintendent Garry Edwin Harland	
Queensland	Detective Inspector Anne Macdonald	
Queensland	Chief Superintendent Timothy James Roche	
Western Australia	Senior Constable Frazer David Arthur	
Western Australia	Superintendent Christopher John Dawson	
Western Australia	Superintendent David John Parkinson	
South Australia	Senior Sergeant Peter Ross Hibbard	
South Australia	Detective Senior Sergeant Michael Francis Lyons	
Tasmania	Commander Thomas Alexander Tully	
Northern Territory	Superintendent Warren Leonard O'Meara	

=== Australian Fire Service Medal (ASFM) ===
Service	Recipient	Notes
New South Wales	Group Captain Warren Bradley Arnott	
New South Wales	Inspector Keith Alan Blades	
New South Wales	Station Commander Raymond Lawrence Day	
New South Wales	Deputy Captain Donald George Duffy	
New South Wales	Fire Control Officer Karen Ann Hodges	
New South Wales	Fire Control Officer John Garry Hojel	
New South Wales	Superintendent John William Jenks	
New South Wales	Fire Control Officer Peter John Kearney	
New South Wales	Group Captain Norman Francis Mann	
New South Wales	Senior Deputy Captain Ian Robert McCrohon	
New South Wales	Station Officer Christopher John Murtagh	
New South Wales	Superintendent John William Neely	
New South Wales	Captain Ronald Owen Rollinson	
New South Wales	Assistant Commissioner Ross William Smith	
New South Wales	Inspector Frank Colin Turnbull	
Victoria	Station Officer Alexander James Conway	
Victoria	Chief Fire Officer Gary William Morgan	
Victoria	Group Officer Kenneth Graham Reed	
Victoria	Ex Captain Quentin Thornton Turner	
Victoria	Group Officer Holford Murch Wettenhall	
Victoria	Group Officer Trevor Neil Wyatt	
Queensland	Brigade Captain Clyde Herbert Dwyer	
Queensland	Assistant Commissioner Peter John George	
Queensland	Area Director Jeffrey Robert Harper	
Queensland	Group Officer Graham Micheal Peall	
Western Australia	Assistant Chief Officer Kevin William Cuneo	
Western Australia	Chief Fire Control Officer Kenneth Charlton Fowler	
Western Australia	Fire Control Officer Thomas Ernest Richards	
South Australia	Brigade Captain John William Atze	
South Australia	Group Officer Robert Maddern	
South Australia	Retained Station Officer Mervyn Lawrence Rosenzweig	
South Australia	Station Officer Owen Ralph Shephard	

=== Ambulance Service Medal (ASM) ===
Service	Recipient	Notes
New South Wales	Graeme Michael Malone	
New South Wales	Graham Robert Webster	
New South Wales	Keith Ramon Williams	
Queensland	Harry George Benjamin	
Queensland	Ronald Alfred Hayden	
Tasmania	Gary Brian Alexander	
Tasmania	Robert James Holton	
Tasmania	Superintendent Edward Allan Preshaw	

=== Emergency Services Medal (ESM) ===
Service	Recipient	Notes
New South Wales	Francis John Nicholas	
New South Wales	Commodore Malcolm Lange Wilson	
Queensland	Alan Francis Harris	
South Australia	Gordon Charles Hartley	
Victoria	Philip Walter Baade	
Victoria	Kenneth Benjamin Hubbard	
