= 2023 New Zealand Labour Party leadership election =

- 22 January 2023

>50% of votes in an electoral college required to win
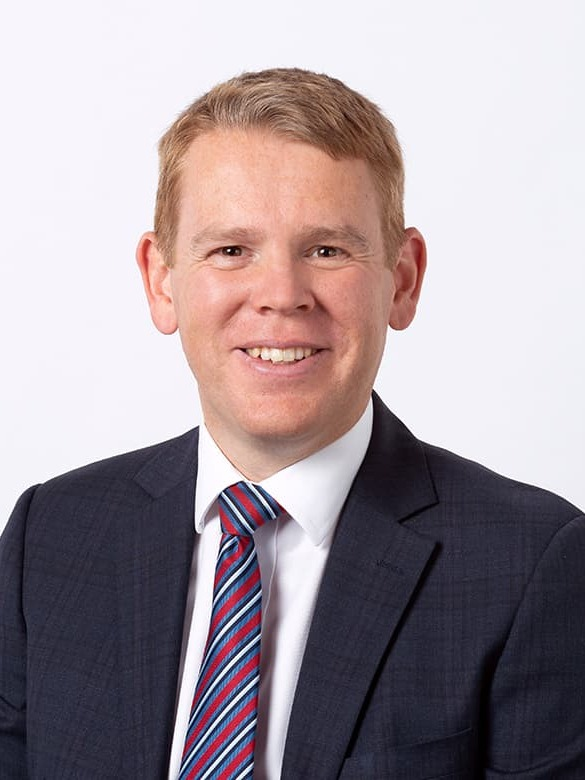
Candidate	Chris Hipkins
Leader's seat	Remutaka
Popular vote	Unopposed
Leader before election
Jacinda Ardern
Elected Leader
Chris Hipkins

The 2023 New Zealand Labour Party leadership election was held on 22 January 2023 to choose the next leader of the New Zealand Labour Party. The election was triggered by the resignation of Prime Minister and Labour Party Leader Jacinda Ardern, which was announced on 19 January 2023.

With Chris Hipkins as the only candidate, he won the election by default. He was confirmed as leader on the afternoon of 22 January, with Ardern's deputy leader Kelvin Davis confirmed as continuing in his role.

== Background ==
Jacinda Ardern served as leader of the Labour Party after winning the 2017 leadership election. She announced her resignation as leader of the Labour Party in a televised statement on 19 January 2023, stating that she no longer had sufficient energy for the demands of the role. She indicated that she would formally step down no later than 7 February 2023. Because the Labour Party won the 2020 general election, the incoming Labour Party leader became the 41st Prime Minister of New Zealand.

== Process and outcome ==
The leadership election was the first to be held under new rules agreed by the party in 2021. Candidates needed 10% of the caucus (seven MPs) to nominate. The caucus (64 Labour MPs) votes via exhaustive ballot, and a candidate would require the support of two-thirds of the party caucus (i.e., 48 MPs) to be elected. If no-one can get two-thirds the candidate with the fewest votes would be eliminated. This would continue until someone is elected. Caucus may hold multiple rounds of voting for the final two candidates. If no candidate can be selected, then the leadership will be determined by an electoral college comprising the caucus (40 per cent), party members (40 per cent) and trade unions affiliated to the party (20 per cent), where a simple majority suffices.

Hipkins was the only nominee. His nominators included Michael Wood and Kiri Allan, both of whom were considered by media as prospective leaders. Before Hipkins was confirmed as the candidate, Labour deputy leader Kelvin Davis and deputy prime minister Grant Robertson advised they would not be running. Labour MPs told media they had agreed they would identify a "consensus candidate" who had the support of the whole caucus. In his first media appearance as the presumptive leader, in front of Parliament on 21 January, Hipkins told media he found out he had his party's unanimous support as "the door to the plane [that he had boarded for a flight to Wellington] was closing," leaving him unable to respond to his messages for 40 minutes.

A caucus meeting, where Hipkins was formally confirmed as Labour leader, occurred on Sunday 22 January at 1pm. The Labour Māori caucus, an influential subgroup of 14 MPs, intended to meet the day before; but with Hipkins as the only candidate, the meeting was cancelled. Ahead of a scheduled press conference that was timed for two hours after the beginning of the caucus meeting, where the outcome of the election was to be announced, Labour MPs Jenny Salesa and Shanan Halbert confirmed on Twitter that Hipkins would be the new Labour leader and broke the news that Kelvin Davis would stay on as deputy party leader while social development minister Carmel Sepuloni would replace Grant Robertson as deputy prime minister.

== Public opinion ==
News website Stuff conducted a survey the day after Ardern announced her resignation. The survey data is a weighted average, however "due to being an anonymous, public poll, it was possible respondents could have answered the survey multiple times." Curia conducted a scientific online poll on behalf of The Taxpayers' Union.

Date	Poll conductor	Sample size	Chris Hipkins	Kiri Allan	Grant Robertson	Nanaia Mahuta	Michael Wood	Megan Woods	None of the above	Don't know
20 January 2023	Stuff	25,758	41%	15%	–	5%	4%	2%	21%	13%
20 January 2023	The Taxpayers' Union – Curia	1,000	30%	10%	–	8%	6%	5%	41%	–
19–20 January 2023	Horizon	886	26%	13%	9%	4%	4%	2%	7%	18

== Aftermath ==
As the leader of the governing party, Hipkins was sworn in as the 41st Prime Minister of New Zealand on 25 January 2023. He led the Labour Party to its defeat at the general election on 14 October 2023. The Labour Party constitution requires a confidence vote on the leader to be held within three months of each general election, after which a new leadership election will be triggered if the leader does not have the support of 60% of their caucus. In the 7 November 2023 vote, Hipkins was re-elected unopposed. The New Zealand Herald reported that possible dissent led by David Parker was quelled after Hipkins agreed to review the party's tax policy. At the same meeting, Kelvin Davis resigned as deputy leader and was succeeded by outgoing deputy prime minister Carmel Sepuloni.
