= Resignation of Jacinda Ardern =

2023 resignation of the Prime Minister of New Zealand

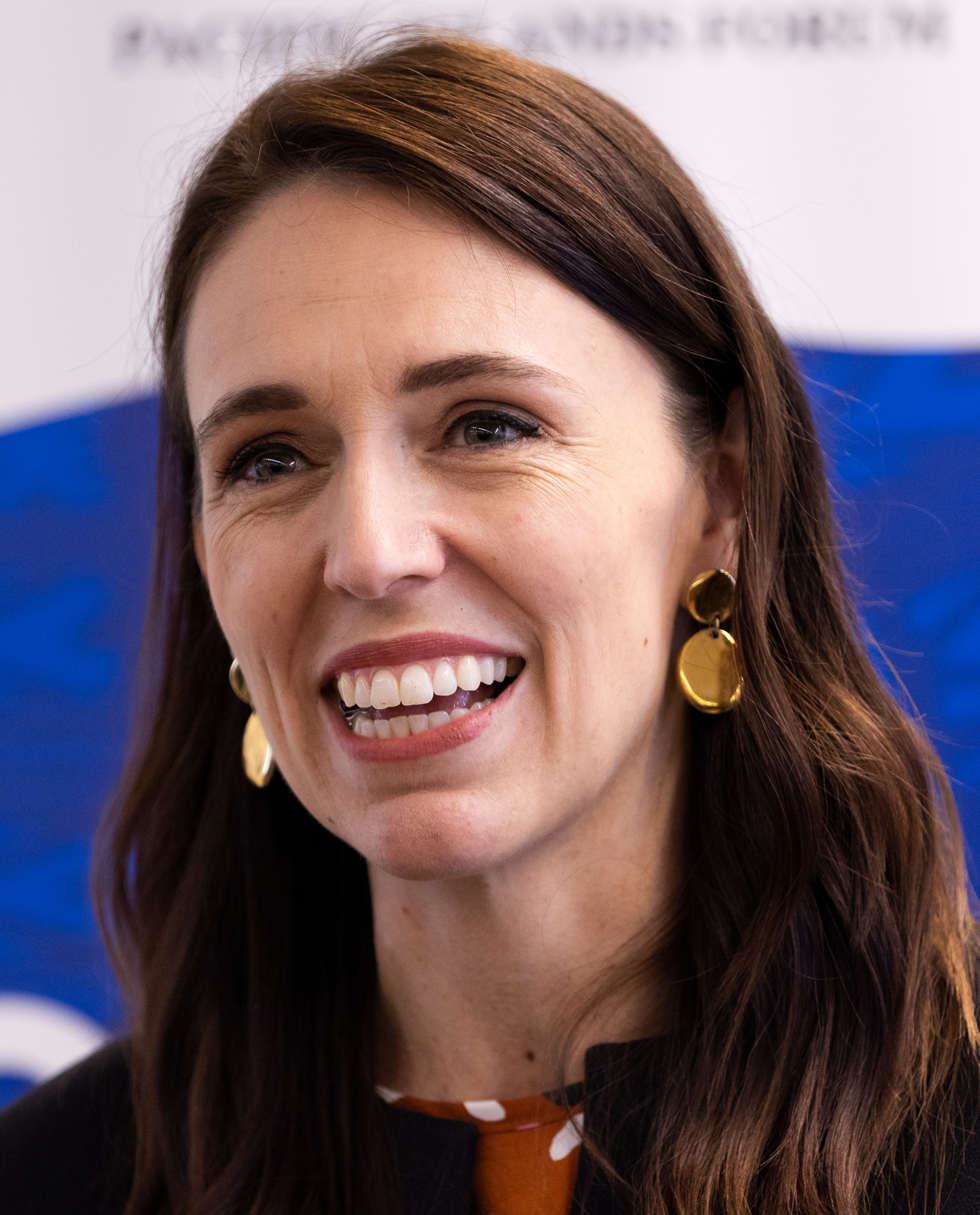
- Ardern in 2022
- Date: 19–25 January 2023
- Time: 1:00 pm (NZDT, UTC+13:00)
- Duration: 6 days (full transition)
- Venue: Napier War Memorial Centre
- Location: Napier, New Zealand
- Cause: Occupational burnout
- Participants: Jacinda Ardern; Chris Hipkins; Cindy Kiro

On 19 January 2023, Jacinda Ardern, the 40th prime minister of New Zealand and leader of the Labour Party, announced her resignation at a press conference at the War Memorial Centre in Napier, Hawke's Bay. Ardern, who had been in office since 2017, cited occupational burnout as the primary reason for her resignation. She stated that she "no longer had enough in the tank" to fulfil the demands of the premiership, and that she would not be seeking re-election at the 2023 New Zealand general election (the date of which she announced in the same speech). She also expressed hope that she would spend more time with her family, and that she had left behind a legacy that one "can be kind, but strong" and "your own kind of leader – one that knows when it's time to go."

Ardern's resignation came at a time when her Labour Party was facing declining public opinion polls. In the months leading up to her resignation, Labour's polling numbers had fallen below those of the opposition National Party. Labour's declining popularity was attributed to the government's response to the COVID-19 pandemic being one of the world's strictest and the rising cost of living.

While some critiqued her government for policy failings, she was also praised for her empathetic style of leadership, her government's response to the COVID-19 pandemic in New Zealand and to the Christchurch mosque shootings, and for empowering women, girls, and ethnic minorities. Some expressed concern that abuse and often misogynistic threats Ardern received in the aftermath of her government's COVID-19 policies may have played a role, with threats against her having almost tripled over three years. Such interpretations were denied by Ardern and criticised as patronising or sexist by others. The announcement triggered a Labour Party leadership election, which saw Leader of the House Chris Hipkins elected unopposed to succeed her. Hipkins praised Ardern's leadership immediately and then condemned any threats made against her. After Ardern officially tendered her resignation to Governor-General Cindy Kiro, Hipkins succeeded to the premiership at 11:30 on 25 January.

== Background ==
On 1 August 2017, just seven weeks before the 2017 general election, Ardern assumed the position of leader of the Labour Party, and consequently became leader of the Opposition, following the resignation of Andrew Little. Little stood down due to the party's historically low polling. Ardern was unanimously confirmed in an election to choose a new leader at a caucus meeting the same day. At 37, Ardern became the youngest leader of the Labour Party in its history. At the election, Ardern's leadership increased her party's seats from 32 to 46, and formed a minority government in coalition with NZ First and with support from the Greens. The Labour Party under Ardern won a majority at the 2020 general election, becoming the first government of the mixed-member proportional representation era to gain enough seats to govern alone. The party won 65 out of 120 seats in the House of Representatives and over half of the popular vote. The party also won the party vote in 71 out of 72 electorates, an unprecedented occurrence in any election in New Zealand history.

The popular approval of her government, and eventually her personal popularity, began to decisively wane in 2022. A Horizons research poll showed that of more than 1000 people polled 35% felt "disappointed" and 28% "angry" about Ardern, with her specifically being targeted rather than the government. A rise in anti-vaccine sentiment, encouraged and on occasion funded by external right-wing influences, caused online attacks on Ardern to rise near-exponentially. This resulted in the unprecedentedly aggressive occupation of Parliament Grounds in Wellington in 2022. The protests were unusually violent, with many participants advocating far-right politics such as Trumpism, white nationalism and Christian fundamentalism. Some protesters hung nooses from trees and made threats to lynch politicians, including Ardern, and also gay Finance Minister Grant Robertson and pregnant MP Steph Lewis. Antisemitism was reported to be "rife" within the protests, with the Parliamentary grounds vandalised with swastikas, protestors misappropriating yellow stars, and messages targeting Jews written on car windows. There were also several reports of sexual assault from within the protest grounds, and protestors were widely reported to be throwing their own faeces at police. The violent month-long occupation caused major disruption in Wellington, and The Guardian reported that threats against Ardern had almost tripled. The effects of the 2022 COVID-19 induced recession also contributed to an unfavourable perception of Labour, and Ardern personally was blamed by many anti-vaccine protestors in its wake. In August 2022, a 1News/Kantar poll, taken as the cost of living soars in New Zealand, marked Ardern's worst result in the preferred prime minister stakes since her tenure as leader began. Despite falling three points as preferred prime minister, Ardern was still ahead of National's Christopher Luxon, at 30% to 22%; she never lost a preferred prime minister poll in her entire tenure.

In parliamentary systems such as that of New Zealand, it is not unusual for prime ministers to resign before facing re-election. There was speculation among right-wing media columnists in November 2022 that Ardern was about to resign imminently. The idea was mocked by Toby Manhire, editor-at-large of the left-leaning online news site The Spinoff, for being baseless.

== Resignation ==
On 19 January 2023, Ardern gave a speech at a routine press conference in Napier, the location of the annual Labour Party conference. It was there that, in addition to announcing the date of the upcoming election (14 October 2023), that she declared she would not lead Labour into it.

I am entering now my sixth year in office. And for each of those years, I have given my absolute all. I believe that leading a country is the most privileged job anyone could ever have, but also one of the more challenging. You cannot, and should not do it unless you have a full tank, plus, a bit in reserve for those unexpected challenges. This summer, I had hoped to find a way to prepare for not just another year, but another term – because that is what this year requires. I have not been able to do that. And so today, I am announcing that I will not be seeking re-election and that my term as prime minister will conclude no later than the 7th of February... I know there will be much discussion in the aftermath of this decision as to what the so called "real" reason was. I can tell you, that what I am sharing today is it. The only interesting angle you will find is that after going on six years of some big challenges, that I am human. Politicians are human. We give all that we can, for as long as we can, and then it's time. And for me, it's time.

— Jacinda Ardern, 19 January 2023

She also addressed her daughter, Neve, that she would be there for her when she started school in June. She also said to Clarke Gayford, her long-time fiancée, "let's finally get married." She also announced that she would leave Parliament in April, a date sufficiently close to the impending election so as not to trigger a by-election for her electorate of Mount Albert.

== Reactions ==
=== Domestic ===
The announcement caught domestic and international media by surprise. Although there had been some minor speculation she might resign a few months before, it had been largely dismissed. Ardern's legacy was immediately discussed. Writing for The Guardian, commentator Henry Cooke wrote that while the human reasons for Ardern's resignation were understandable, the political consequences were "confounding", and imperiled her party and her personal legacy. "Labour MPs and supporters have every right to be furious. Ardern was facing a very steep hill at the October election, which explains more than any other reason her decision to leave. Cooke pointed to Ardern's continued approval ratings, with her never having come second in the preferred prime minister polls. He concluded that she remained Labour’s "best weapon" against National Party leader Christopher Luxon, who he claimed drew largely apathetic responses from the public. Cooke added that according to data from the New Zealand Election Study the majority of voters who switched from National to Labour between 2017 and 2020 (16% of the electorate in the latter) had "overwhelmingly strong feelings of adoration" for Ardern. He added that the swing voters had the strongest political capital in the country, adding "while some of them may have changed their mind, anyone who liked a leader this much remains persuadable."

Former deputy prime minister Winston Peters, leader of the populist New Zealand First party, praised Ardern's first term, in which he served alongside her, but was more critical of her second term, stating "it is a difficult time to make an analysis". Many on the political right criticised Ardern, with some welcoming and even celebrating her resignation. While he initially wished her well, National Party leader Christopher Luxon took the opportunity to critique her government. He claimed that the economic situation would only get worse under a new Labour prime minister. When asked if he believed that female politicians face more threats than male ones, Luxon disagreed, sparking criticism.

Many expressed their view that Ardern's resignation was caused in part by the abuse she had suffered, which reached levels unprecedented for a New Zealand prime minister. Former prime minister Helen Clark said that "the pressures on Prime Ministers are always great, but in this era of social media, clickbait, and 24/7 media cycles, Jacinda has faced a level of hatred and vitriol which in my experience is unprecedented in our country.. our society could now usefully reflect on whether it wants to continue to tolerate the excessive polarisation which is making politics an increasingly unattractive calling." This viewpoint was criticised by radio presenter Ryan Bridge, who claimed it was "melodramatic". He elaborated that the claim was "just bizarre because, one, it assumes that she's reading all of the online troll messages from the misogynists and whoever". Political commentator and former National Party ministerial advisor Brigitte Morten called Clark's remarks "naive" and "condescending", claiming that such comments would not be made of a male prime minister. Another politician who voiced concern at the misogyny directed towards Ardern was Debbie Ngarewa-Packer, female co-leader of the Māori Party. She said that "it is a sad day for politics where an outstanding leader has been driven from office for constant personalisation and vilification", expressing concern for Ardern's whānau and personal safety.

Ardern's safety going forward has come under scrutiny. The New Zealand Herald reported that she would need "unprecedented" police protection "well beyond the end of her time as Prime Minister", even as new figures show the extent of the abuse she faced from the far-right. The Herald’s own investigation into the online targeting of Ardern discovered threats of rape and murder, her portrayal as demonic or "evil", and calls to execute her as a traitor or "war criminal". Kate Hannah, director of the anti-misinformation Disinformation Project, claimed that the abuse was prolific on mainstream social media channels, particularly on Facebook. She stated that misogynistic online hatred of Ardern, which began after she condemned the far-right in the wake of the Christchurch mosque shootings, had become a dangerous threat for New Zealand's democracy. Intelligence analyst Dr Paul Buchanan argued that Ardern's response to the massacre "galvanised the most retrograde elements of the far right", before worsening as the pandemic response passed. He added that "being young, female and successful" was a "whole different level of vitriol." Buchanan expressed his belief that the Diplomatic Protection Service would increase efforts to protect her and her family, and that she "deserves to reclaim her life as a private citizen."

=== World leaders ===
- United States: President Joe Biden honoured Ardern on Twitter, saying that "the U.S.-New Zealand partnership is stronger than ever, thanks in large part to your leadership. Your stewardship in advancing a free and open Indo-Pacific was crucial – I look forward to deepening our nations’ ties for generations to come." Vice President Kamala Harris said "Prime Minister Ardern is a forward-looking, global leader who has inspired millions around the world. Thank you, Madam Prime Minister, for your leadership and for strengthening the ties between the U.S. and New Zealand."
- Australia: Prime Minister Anthony Albanese said: "Jacinda Ardern has shown the world how to lead with intellect and strength. She has demonstrated that empathy and insight are powerful leadership qualities. Jacinda has been a fierce advocate for New Zealand, an inspiration to so many and a great friend to me." Minister of Foreign Affairs Penny Wong said "Jacinda brought strength, compassion and kindness to leadership, gaining the admiration of so many around the world. [She is] a source of inspiration to me and many others."
- United Kingdom: Prime Minister Rishi Sunak thanked Ardern "for her kindness and strong leadership." He also tweeted: "she has shone a light on the unique opportunities and challenges faced in the Indo-Pacific, and has always been a great friend of the UK." William, Prince of Wales, also tweeted his support, thanking Ardern for her "friendship, leadership and support over the years, not least at the time of my grandmother’s death. Sending you, Clarke and Neve our best wishes. W & C".
- Cook Islands: Prime Minister Mark Brown praised her response to the COVID-19 pandemic, saying that "New Zealand's own response was held up as a shining example of how to protect your people. New Zealand working with our country enabled us really to protect our people from COVID but secondly allowed us to quickly get back on our feet due to the measures that we did take early on". He added that "her compassion and her strength of leadership is a legacy that I think she will leave as prime minister of New Zealand."
- Canada: Prime Minister Justin Trudeau thanked her personally for "your partnership and your friendship — and for your empathic, compassionate, strong, and steady leadership over these past several years. The difference you have made is immeasurable. I’m wishing you and your family nothing but the best, my friend".
- Fiji: Deputy Prime Minister Biman Prasad said the Pacific would miss the "charismatic leader", telling RNZ Pacific he was happy to meet Ardern when she visited the country in 2020. In his own words Fiji had "benefitted immensely" under her leadership, with Ardern's government providing "urgent and timely help to the Fijian people during natural disasters and the COVID-19 pandemic."

=== Other international ===
Former Australian prime minister Kevin Rudd said Ardern "provided a masterclass in international public diplomacy" and 'rewrote the rulebook" for world leaders. On Twitter, former U.S. president Barack Obama praised Ardern's leadership, integrity and empathy. Former U.S. Secretary of State Hillary Clinton noted Ardern's significance as a woman leading a country, stating "[s]he's shown the world a new model of powerful leadership. A true stateswoman."

== Succession ==
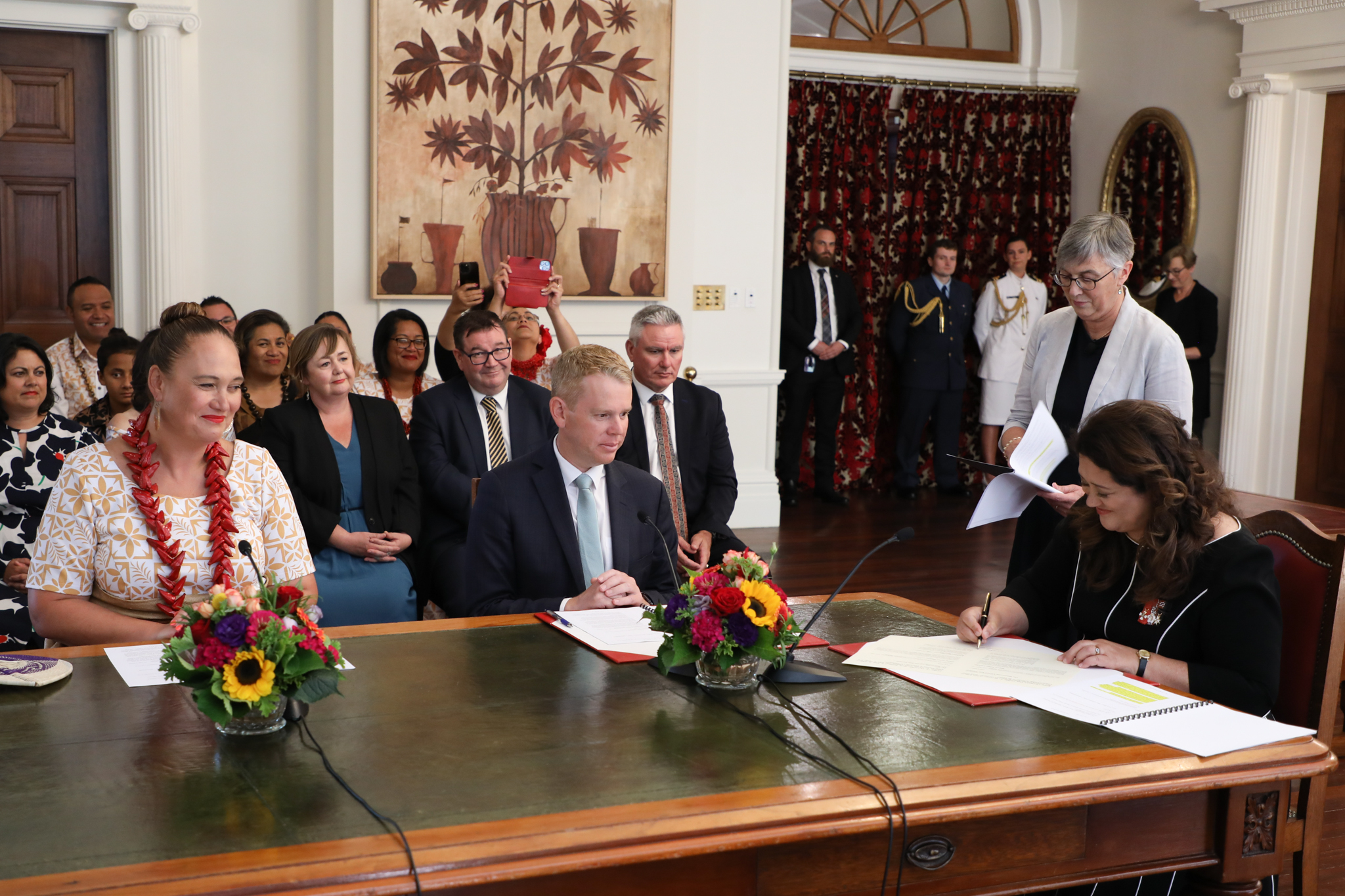
Hipkins and Sepuloni being appointed as prime minister and deputy, respectively, by Dame Cindy Kiro

The announcement triggered an imminent leadership election, scheduled by an emergency caucus meeting for 22 January. The election spawned much press attention, as Ardern's abrupt resignation was seen as endangering an already unpopular Labour Party's chances at reelection later that year. Several members of Ardern's Cabinet were considered. The following were the most commonly named options:

- Chris Hipkins, the Leader of the House, Minister for Police, Education and the Public Service
- Kiritapu Allan, the Minister of Justice
- Grant Robertson, the Deputy Prime Minister and Minister of Finance

Ministers Michael Wood and Megan Woods were also named as potential candidates by some news outlets. Robertson was quick to rule himself out, but indicated he wished to continue as finance minister. Labour deputy leader Kelvin Davis also advised he would not be running. As nominations closed on 21 January, Hipkins emerged as the only nominee. His nominators included Michael Wood and Kiritapu Allan, both of whom were considered by media as prospective leaders. The lack of a direct vote was seen as evidence of Labour's intention to have an orderly transition, as opposed to the multiple changes to the National Party leadership since their loss of power. There have been a total of five National Party leadership elections (2016, 2018, May 2020, July 2020, and 2021) since the resignation of John Key, the last National prime minister to win a general election, and six leaders (including interim leader Shane Reti) over the past six years. Labour MPs told media they had agreed they would identify a "consensus candidate" who had the support of the whole caucus. In his first media appearance as the presumptive leader, on 21 January Hipkins told media he found out he had his party's unanimous support as "the door to the plane [that he had boarded for a flight to Wellington] was closing," leaving him unable to respond to his messages for 40 minutes. A caucus meeting, where Hipkins was formally confirmed as Labour leader, occurred on 22 January at 1 pm. Minister for Social Development Carmel Sepuloni was chosen to become deputy prime minister (though not deputy leader of the Labour Party), becoming the country's first Pasifika person to hold the title. The ticket was welcomed by many, with Hipkins and Sepuloni being recognised for both being working-class in background. The Māori Party voiced criticism that a Māori candidate was not chosen to be prime minister.

Ardern's last public event as prime minister was Rātana Day at Rātana Pā in the Manawatū on 24 January, which she attended with Hipkins. Hipkins spoke of Labour's longstanding political alliance with the Rātana Church. In her last public speech, Ardern said leading the country was "the greatest privilege of my life", and that she "[leaves] with a greater love and affection for Aotearoa New Zealand and its people than when I started."

The following morning, Ardern left the Beehive for Government House, Wellington, where she privately tendered her resignation to the Governor-General, Dame Cindy Kiro. Hipkins and Sepuloni were jointly sworn in at a televised ceremony shortly before noon as prime minister and deputy prime minister.
