= Shadow Cabinet of Jacinda Ardern =

New Zealand shadow cabinet (August–October 2017)

Jacinda Ardern announced a reshuffled shadow cabinet on 3 August 2017, just two days after she was elected Leader of the Labour Party in New Zealand. The changes were relatively minor and mostly kept the structure inherited from her predecessor Andrew Little. As the Labour Party formed the largest party not in government, this Frontbench team was as a result the Official Opposition of the New Zealand House of Representatives.

== Frontbench team ==
The list below contains a list of Ardern's spokespeople and their respective roles.

Rank	Spokesperson	Portfolio
1	Jacinda Ardern	Leader of the Opposition; Spokesperson for Security Intelligence Service; Spokesperson for Children; Spokesperson for Arts, Culture and Heritage; Associate Spokesperson for Auckland Issues
	Kelvin Davis	Deputy Leader of the Opposition; Spokesperson for Maori Development; Spokesperson for Corrections
3	Grant Robertson	Spokesperson for Finance; Spokesperson for Employment; Associate Spokesperson for Art, Culture and Heritage
4	Phil Twyford	Spokesperson for Housing, Building and Construction; Spokesperson for Auckland Issues; Associate Spokesperson for Transport (Auckland and Ports)
5	Dr Megan Woods	Spokesperson for Canterbury Issues; Spokesperson for Climate Change; Spokesperson for Energy; Spokesperson for Innovation and Science; Spokesperson for Research and Development; Associate Spokesperson for Trade and Export Growth
6	Chris Hipkins	Spokesperson for Education (Including Tertiary Education and Early Childhood Education); Shadow Leader of the House
7	Andrew Little	Spokesperson for Justice; Spokesperson for Small Business; Spokesperson for ACC; Spokesperson for New Economy
8	Carmel Sepuloni	Junior Whip; Spokesperson for Social Development; Associate Spokesperson for Education; Associate Spokesperson for Pacific Island Affairs; Associate Spokesperson for Children
9	Dr David Clark	Spokesperson of Health
10	Hon David Parker	Shadow Attorney General; Spokesperson for the Environment; Spokesperson for Foreign Affairs; Spokesperson for Water; Spokesperson for Regulatory Reform; Spokesperson for Entrepreneurship & Trade and Export Growth
11	Hon Nanaia Mahuta	Spokesperson for Conservation; Spokesperson for Whanau Ora; Associate Spokesperson for Maori Development
12	Stuart Nash	Spokesperson for Police; Spokesperson for Forestry; Spokesperson for Economic Development (Including Regional Development)
13	Meka Whaitiri	Spokesperson for Local Government; Associate Spokesperson for Primary Industries; Associate Spokesperson for Food Safety
14	Iain Lees-Galloway	Spokesperson for Workplace relations and Safety; Spokesperson for Immigration; Spokesperson for Defence
15	William Sio	Spokesperson for Pacific Island Affairs; Spokesperson for Interfaith Dialogue; Associate Spokesperson for Foreign Affairs (Pacific Climate Change); Associate Spokesperson for Ethnic Communities
16	Sue Moroney	Spokesperson for Transport; Associate Spokesperson for Workplace Relations and Safety
17	Hon Damien O'Connor	Spokesperson for Primary Industries; Spokesperson for Biosecurity; Spokesperson for Food Safety
18	Kris Faafoi	Senior Whip; Spokesperson for Racing; Spokesperson for Tourism; Associate Spokesperson for Broadcasting
19	Jenny Salesa	Spokesperson for Skills and Training; Associate Spokesperson for Education; Associate Spokesperson for Health; Associate Spokesperson for Employment
20	Peeni Henare	Spokesperson for Urban Maori; Spokesperson for Maori Broadcasting; Spokesperson for State Owned Enterprisess; Associate Spokesperson for Māori Development; Associate Spokesperson for Economic Development
21	Clare Curran	Spokesperson for ICT; Spokesperson for Broadcasting; Spokesperson for Open Government; Spokesperson for Civil Defense and Emergency Management; Associate Spokesperson for Commerce
22	Adrian Rurawhe	Spokesperson for Internal Affairs; Spokesperson for Treaty of Waitangi Negotiationss; Associate Spokesperson for Education (Māori)
23	Hon Annette King	Spokesperson for State Services
24	Hon Trevor Mallard	Assistant Speaker; Spokesperson for Sport and Recreation; Spokesperson for Animal Welfare; Spokesperson for Parliamentary Reform
25	Hon Ruth Dyson	Spokesperson for Senior Citizens; Spokesperson for Women's Affairs; Spokesperson for Statistics; Associate Spokesperson for Ethnic Communities (South Island)
26	Rino Tirikatene	Spokesperson for Fisheries; Spokesperson for Customs
27	Poto Williams	Spokesperson for Community and Voluntary Sector; Spokesperson for Disability Issues; Associate Spokesperson for Justice (Sexual & Domestic Violence)
28	Louisa Wall	Spokesperson for Courts; Spokesperson for Youth Affairs; Associate Spokesperson for Justice (Legal Aid); Associate Spokesperson for Sport and Recreation
29	Hon Clayton Cosgrove	Spokesperson for Commerce; Spokesperson for Veterans Affairs; Spokesperson for Business Outreach; Associate Spokesperson for Finance
30	Michael Wood	Spokesperson for Consumer Affairs; Spokesperson for Ethnic Communities; Spokesperson for Revenue
31	Raymond Huo	Spokesperson for Land Information
