= Opinion polling for the 2023 New Zealand general election =

Opinion polls in New Zealand

Several polling firms conducted opinion polls during the term of the 53rd New Zealand Parliament (2020–2023) for the 2023 New Zealand general election. The regular polls are the quarterly polls produced by TVNZ (1News) conducted by Verian (formerly known as Colmar Brunton and Kantar Public) and Discovery New Zealand (Newshub) conducted by Reid Research, along with monthly polls by Roy Morgan, and by Curia (Taxpayers' Union). The sample size, margin of error and confidence interval of each poll varies by organisation and date.

The current parliament was elected on 17 October 2020. The general election took place on 14 October 2023.

== Party vote ==
Graph of opinion polls in NZ by party. Smoothed trendlines fitted using LOWESS regression (bandwidth = 0.35)

Graph of opinion polls in NZ by party, excluding National and Labour. Smoothed trendlines fitted using LOWESS regression (bandwidth = 0.35)

Graph of opinion polls in NZ by party bloc. Smoothed trendlines fitted using LOWESS regression (bandwidth = 0.35)

=== Nationwide polling ===
Poll results are listed in the table below in reverse chronological order. The highest percentage figure in each polling survey is displayed in bold, and the background shaded in the leading party's colour. The 'party lead' column shows the percentage-point difference between the two parties with the highest figures. In the instance of a tie, both figures are shaded and displayed in bold. Percentages may not add to 100 percent due to polls not reporting figures for all minor parties and due to rounding. Refusals are generally excluded from the party vote percentages, while question wording and the treatment of "don't know" responses and those not intending to vote may vary between survey organisations.

The parties shown in the table are Labour (LAB), National (NAT), Green (GRN), ACT, Māori (TPM), New Zealand First (NZF), Opportunities (TOP), New Conservative (NCP), and New Zealand Loyal (NZL). Other parties may have also registered in some polls, but are not listed in this table.

| Date (Note: These are the survey dates of the poll, or if the survey dates are not stated, the date the poll was released.) | Polling organisation | Sample size | LAB | NAT | GRN | ACT | TPM | NZF | TOP | NCP | Lead |
|---|---|---|---|---|---|---|---|---|---|---|---|
| **14 Oct 2023** | **2023 election result** | N/A | 26.92 | **38.08** | 11.61 | 8.64 | 3.08 | 6.09 | 2.22 | 0.15 | 11.16 |
| **7–10 Oct 2023** | 1 News–Verian | 1,001 | 28 | **37** | 14 | 9 | 1.7 | 6 | 2.3 | – | 9 |
| **5–10 Oct 2023** | Newshub–Reid Research | | 27.5 | **34.5** | 14.9 | 8.8 | 2.7 | 6.8 | 2.2 | – | 7 |
| **9 Oct 2023** | **The Port Waikato electorate vote is cancelled after ACT candidate Neil Christensen dies; a replacement by-election will be held on 25 November 2023.** | | | | | | | | | | |
| **4 Sep – 8 Oct 2023** | Roy Morgan | 1,250 | 26 | **30.5** | 15 | 11.5 | 3 | 7.5 | 3.5 | - | 4.5 |
| **4–8 Oct 2023** | Guardian Essential | 1,200 | 30.3 | **34** | 10.6 | 7.9 | 1.9 | 8.2 | – | – | 3.7 |
| **1–4 Oct 2023** | Taxpayers' Union-Curia | 1,000 | 27.9 | **35.9** | 10.6 | 9.1 | 3.7 | 6.9 | 2.9 | 0.7 | 8 |
| **30 Sep – 3 Oct 2023** | 1 News–Verian | 1,000 | 26 | **36** | 13 | 10 | 2.2 | 6 | 1.5 | – | 10 |
| **2 Oct 2023** | **Advance voting for the 2023 general election begins.** | | | | | | | | | | |
| **22–28 Sep 2023** | Talbot Mills | 1,027 | 27 | **38** | 13 | 9 | 3.1 | 6.4 | 2.3 | – | 11 |
| **23–26 Sep 2023** | 1 News–Verian | 1,002 | 26 | **36** | 13 | 12 | 1.9 | 6 | 1.3 | 0.6 | 10 |
| **17–23 Sep 2023** | Newshub–Reid Research | | 26.5 | **39.1** | 14.2 | 8.8 | 2.2 | 5.2 | 1.9 | 1.1 | 12.6 |
| **16–19 Sep 2023** | 1 News–Verian | 1,001 | 27 | **37** | 12 | 12 | 2.9 | 5 | 1.4 | 0.1 | 10 |
| **9–12 Sep 2023** | 1 News–Verian | 1,002 | 28 | **39** | 10 | 10 | 2.6 | 5 | 1.4 | 0.8 | 11 |
| **6–10 Sep 2023** | Guardian Essential | 1,154 | 26.9 | **34.5** | 11 | 10.3 | 2.5 | 6 | – | – | 7.6 |
| **3–9 Sep 2023** | Newshub–Reid Research | | 26.8 | **40.9** | 12.3 | 10.1 | 3.1 | 4.6 | 0.7 | 0.8 | 14.1 |
| **31 Aug – 6 Sep 2023** | Taxpayers' Union–Curia | 1,000 | 26.5 | **35** | 12.7 | 14.3 | 2.9 | 3.9 | 2.7 | 0.8 | 8.5 |
| **28–30 Aug 2023** | The Post–Freshwater Strategy | 1,511 | 26 | **36** | 12 | 11 | 3 | 6 | – | – | 10 |
| **24–30 Aug 2023** | Talbot Mills | | 30 | **36** | 12 | 10 | 2.4 | 5.4 | 1.5 | – | 6 |
| **31 Jul – 27 Aug 2023** | Roy Morgan | 1,046 | 24 | **31** | 12.5 | 18 | 4 | 5.5 | 2 | – | 7 |
| **25 Aug 2023** | Talbot Mills (Note: Private poll) | | 32 | **34** | 11 | 10 | 4 | 6 | – | – | 2 |
| **12–16 Aug 2023** | 1 News–Verian | 1,002 | 29 | **37** | 12 | 13 | 2.6 | 3.7 | 0.6 | 0.3 | 8 |
| **3–8 Aug 2023** | Taxpayers' Union–Curia | 1,000 | 27.1 | **34.9** | 12 | 13 | 2.5 | 5.8 | 1 | 0.6 | 7.8 |
| **31 Jul – 7 Aug 2023** | Talbot Mills | 1,012 | 32 | **35** | 10 | 11 | 3.1 | 4.4 | 1.8 | – | 3 |
| **2–6 Aug 2023** | Guardian Essential | 1,163 | 29 | **34.5** | 8.5 | 11.6 | 2.5 | 5.3 | – | – | 5.5 |
| **26–31 Jul 2023** | Newshub–Reid Research | | 32.3 | **36.6** | 9.6 | 12.1 | 2.7 | 4.1 | 1.5 | 0.7 | 4.3 |
| **24 Jul 2023** | **Kiri Allan of the Labour Party resigns as a minister.** | | | | | | | | | | |
| **26 Jun – 23 Jul 2023** | Roy Morgan | 937 | 26 | **33.5** | 9 | 14 | 6 | 5 | 4 | – | 7.5 |
| **8–12 Jul 2023** | 1 News–Verian | 1,000 | 33 | **35** | 10 | 12 | 2.8 | 3.1 | 1.7 | 0.4 | 2 |
| **2–10 Jul 2023** | Taxpayers' Union–Curia | 1,000 | 31.1 | **33.3** | 8.9 | 13.2 | 5 | 3.3 | 0.3 | 0.4 | 2.2 |
| **28 Jun – 2 Jul 2023** | Talbot Mills | 1,036 | 31 | **36** | 8 | 12 | 4.2 | 4 | 2.9 | – | 5 |
| **29 May – 25 Jun 2023** | Roy Morgan | 955 | **30.5** | 30 | 9.5 | 15 | 7 | 3 | 3 | – | 0.5 |
| **21 Jun 2023** | **Michael Wood of the Labour Party resigns as a minister.** | | | | | | | | | | |
| **30 May – 6 Jun 2023** | Talbot Mills | 1,001 | **36** | 35 | 7 | 11 | 3.65 | 2.9 | – | – | 1 |
| **31 May – 6 Jun 2023** | Taxpayers' Union–Curia | 1,000 | 32.9 | **35.7** | 9.7 | 12.7 | 3.5 | 1.6 | 0.8 | 1.3 | 2.8 |
| **20–24 May 2023** | 1 News–Kantar Public | 1,002 | 35 | **37** | 7 | 11 | 2.4 | 3 | 1.4 | 0.6 | 2 |
| **24 Apr – 21 May 2023** | Roy Morgan | 952 | 31 | **31.5** | 12 | 13.5 | 4.5 | 3.5 | 2 | 0.5 | 0.5 |
| **18 May 2023** | **The 2023 Budget is delivered.** | | | | | | | | | | |
| **12–17 May 2023** | Horizon Research | 1,563 | **34.4** | 26.5 | 9.5 | 12.3 | 4.3 | 5.3 | 2.8 | 1.4 | 7.9 |
| **5–11 May 2023** | Newshub–Reid Research | | **35.9** | 35.3 | 8.1 | 10.8 | 3.5 | 3 | 2 | – | 0.6 |
| **2–7 May 2023** | Taxpayers' Union–Curia | 1,000 | 33.8 | **35.6** | 7 | 12.7 | 3.7 | 2.6 | 1.7 | 1.6 | 1.8 |
| **3 May 2023** | **Meka Whaitiri resigns from the Labour Party and joins Te Pāti Māori.** | | | | | | | | | | |
| **27 Apr – 3 May 2023** | Talbot Mills | 1,046 | 33 | **36** | 9 | 10 | 4.1 | 3.4 | 1.8 | – | 3 |
| **27 Mar – 23 Apr 2023** | Roy Morgan | 929 | 30 | **32** | 12 | 12.5 | 4.5 | 4.5 | 2 | 0.5 | 2 |
| **2–5 Apr 2023** | Taxpayers' Union–Curia | 1,000 | **36.9** | 36.5 | 6.7 | 9.5 | 2.9 | 2.6 | 0.8 | 1.7 | 0.4 |
| **30 Mar – 5 Apr 2023** | Talbot Mills | | **36** | **36** | 9 | 10 | 1.9 | 3.9 | 0.8 | – | Tie |
| **28 Mar 2023** | **Stuart Nash of the Labour Party is stripped of all his ministerial portfolios.** | | | | | | | | | | |
| **27 Feb – 26 Mar 2023** | Roy Morgan | 943 | **33** | 32 | 10.5 | 13 | 2 | 3 | 3.5 | 1 | 1 |
| **1–9 Mar 2023** | Talbot Mills | 1,021 | **37** | 34 | 8 | 12 | 3.2 | 2.9 | 1.5 | – | 3 |
| **4–8 Mar 2023** | 1 News–Kantar Public | 1,002 | **36** | 34 | 11 | 11 | 2.6 | 3.1 | 1 | 0.5 | 2 |
| **2–7 Mar 2023** | Taxpayers' Union–Curia | 1,000 | **35.5** | 34.8 | 5.7 | 9.3 | 1.4 | 4.2 | 1.7 | 2.5 | 0.7 |
| **30 Jan – 26 Feb 2023** | Roy Morgan | 943 | **33** | 32 | 12.5 | 13.5 | 3.5 | 2 | 2.5 | 0.5 | 1 |
| **12 Feb 2023** | **Cyclone Gabrielle begins impacting the North Island** | | | | | | | | | | |
| **2–9 Feb 2023** | Taxpayers' Union–Curia | 1,000 | **34.4** | **34.4** | 7.8 | 11.7 | 2.1 | 2.9 | 2 | 0.8 | Tie |
| **26–31 Jan 2023** | Talbot Mills | | 33 | **36** | 11 | 10 | 3 | 3.4 | 2.3 | – | 3 |
| **9–29 Jan 2023** | Roy Morgan | 948 | 30 | **32** | 12 | 13.5 | 4.5 | 5 | 1.5 | 0.5 | 2 |
| **25–29 Jan 2023** | 1 News–Kantar Public | 1,008 | **38** | 37 | 7 | 10 | 1.4 | 2.2 | 1.1 | 0.6 | 1 |
| **23–28 Jan 2023** | Horizon Research | 1,147 | **35.5** | 27.7 | 9 | 13 | 4.6 | 4.5 | 1.6 | 1.1 | 7.8 |
| **27 Jan 2023** | **2023 Auckland Anniversary Weekend floods begin** | | | | | | | | | | |
| **22–27 Jan 2023** | Newshub–Reid Research | | **38** | 36.6 | 8.1 | 10.7 | 1.8 | 2.2 | 1.5 | – | 1.4 |
| **25 Jan 2023** | **Chris Hipkins is sworn in as the 41st Prime Minister of New Zealand.** | | | | | | | | | | |
| **22 Jan 2023** | **Chris Hipkins is unanimously elected Leader of the Labour Party.** | | | | | | | | | | |
| **19 Jan 2023** | **Jacinda Ardern resigns** **as Prime Minister of New Zealand, taking effect 25 January 2023.** | | | | | | | | | | |
| **10–16 Jan 2023** | Taxpayers' Union–Curia | 1,000 | 31.7 | **37.2** | 10.6 | 10.8 | 1.6 | 2.8 | – | – | 5.5 |
| **Dec 2022** | Roy Morgan | 947 | 27.5 | **35** | 11 | 14.5 | 4 | 4 | 2.5 | 1 | 7.5 |
| **10 Dec 2022** | **Tama Potaka of the National Party wins the Hamilton West by-election.** | | | | | | | | | | |
| **1–6 Dec 2022** | Taxpayers' Union–Curia | 1,000 | 33.1 | **39.4** | 8.1 | 10.4 | 3.5 | 2.9 | – | – | 6.3 |
| **Dec 2022** | Talbot Mills | | 32 | **35** | 9 | 11 | 3.5 | 4.3 | 2.4 | – | 3 |
| **26–30 Nov 2022** | 1 News–Kantar Public | 1,011 | 33 | **38** | 9 | 11 | 2 | 3.6 | 1.7 | 0.6 | 5 |
| **31 Oct – 27 Nov 2022** | Roy Morgan | 926 | 25.5 | **39** | 12 | 11 | 4 | 3.5 | 2.5 | 0.5 | 13.5 |
| **3–8 Nov 2022** | Taxpayers' Union–Curia | 1,000 | 35.3 | **37.6** | 7.8 | 9.9 | 1.6 | 3.8 | 2.1 | 0.9 | 2.3 |
| **31 Oct – 7 Nov 2022** | Talbot Mills | | 34 | **35** | 9 | 10 | 3.2 | 4.4 | 2 | – | 1 |
| **25 Oct – 3 Nov 2022** | Newshub–Reid Research | | 32.3 | **40.7** | 9.5 | 10 | 1.9 | 3.3 | 1.2 | – | 8.4 |
| **20–25 Oct 2022** | Horizon Research | 1,154 | **29.7** | 26.6 | 13 | 13.5 | 2.2 | 7.2 | 2 | 1.8 | 3.1 |
| **26 Sep – 23 Oct 2022** | Roy Morgan | 951 | 29 | **32** | 15.5 | 12.5 | 3 | 3.5 | 3 | 0.5 | 3 |
| **2–11 Oct 2022** | Taxpayers' Union–Curia | 1,000 | 34.4 | **39.2** | 7.2 | 9.4 | 2.1 | 2.1 | 3.4 | 1 | 4.8 |
| |**Oct 2022** | Talbot Mills | | **35** | **35** | 9 | 11 | 2.2 | 4 | – | – | Tie |
| **29 Aug – 25 Sep 2022** | Roy Morgan | 942 | 29.5 | **36** | 12.5 | 12.5 | 3.5 | 1 | 2.5 | 0.5 | 6.5 |
| **17–21 Sep 2022** | 1 News–Kantar Public | 1,001 | 34 | **37** | 9 | 9 | 1.6 | 3 | 1.3 | 1 | 3 |
| **12 Sep 2022** | **The COVID-19 Protection Framework officially ends.** | | | | | | | | | | |
| **1–9 Sep 2022** | Taxpayers' Union–Curia | 1,000 | 33.4 | **37** | 9.9 | 12.4 | 1.5 | 1.6 | 0.7 | 1.5 | 3.6 |
| **31 Aug – 7 Sep 2022** | Talbot Mills | | 35 | **38** | 8 | 9 | 3 | – | – | – | 3 |
| **25 Jul – 21 Aug 2022** | Roy Morgan | 947 | 35 | **35.5** | 9 | 10.5 | 5 | 1.5 | 1 | 0.5 | 0.5 |
| **3–11 Aug 2022** | Taxpayers' Union–Curia | 1,200 | **35.2** | 34 | 9.5 | 11 | 3.5 | 2.6 | – | – | 1.2 |
| **28 Jul – 8 Aug 2022** | Talbot Mills | | 36 | **37** | 9 | 10 | – | – | – | – | 1 |
| **30 Jul – 3 Aug 2022** | 1 News–Kantar Public | 1,023 | 33 | **37** | 9 | 11 | 2.3 | 2.6 | 1.9 | 0.7 | 4 |
| **29 Jul – 3 Aug 2022** | Horizon Research | 1,044 | **34.1** | 31.4 | 10.2 | 10.7 | 2.2 | 3.5 | 1.7 | 2.7 | 2.7 |
| **Jul 2022** | Roy Morgan | 937 | 34 | **35** | 10.5 | 11 | 4 | 1.5 | 2.5 | 1 | 1 |
| **3–10 Jul 2022** | Taxpayers' Union–Curia | 1,200 | 34.7 | **37** | 8.5 | 10 | 3.7 | 2.8 | – | – | 2.3 |
| **30 May – 26 Jun 2022** | Roy Morgan | 947 | 33.5 | **39** | 10 | 9.5 | 1.5 | 1.5 | 2 | 0.5 | 5.5 |
| **18 Jun 2022** | **Sam Uffindell of the National Party wins the Tauranga by-election.** | | | | | | | | | | |
| **1–12 Jun 2022** | Taxpayers' Union–Curia | 1,200 | 34.2 | **37.4** | 8.3 | 9.4 | 1.8 | 2.3 | 3 | 1.4 | 3.2 |
| **2–10 Jun 2022** | Talbot Mills | 1,200 | **36** | 35 | 10 | 8 | 3.1 | 3.3 | – | – | 1 |
| **26 Apr – 22 May 2022** | Roy Morgan | 934 | 31.5 | **40** | 11.5 | 10 | 1 | 3 | 1 | 0.5 | 8.5 |
| **21–25 May 2022** | 1 News–Kantar Public | 1,002 | 35 | **39** | 10 | 7 | 1.9 | 1.3 | 1.7 | 1.2 | 4 |
| **19 May 2022** | **The 2022 Budget is delivered.** | | | | | | | | | | |
| **4–11 May 2022** | Taxpayers' Union–Curia | 1,000 | 34.2 | **36.8** | 9.7 | 10.9 | 2.4 | 1.8 | 1.4 | 1.3 | 2.6 |
| **29 Apr – 10 May 2022** | Talbot Mills | | **37** | 36 | 8 | 7 | 3 | 4 | – | – | 1 |
| **18–27 Apr 2022** | Newshub–Reid Research | 1,000 | 38.2 | **40.5** | 8.4 | 6.4 | 2.5 | 1.7 | 0.9 | 0.7 | 2.3 |
| **28 Mar – 24 Apr 2022** | Roy Morgan | 918 | 33.5 | **37.5** | 10.5 | 10 | 1.5 | 2.5 | 2 | 0.5 | 4 |
| **13 Apr 2022** | **New Zealand shifts from the Red Light setting to the Orange Light setting of the COVID-19 Protection Framework.** | | | | | | | | | | |
| **7–13 Apr 2022** | Taxpayers' Union–Curia | 1,000 | 36.8 | **37.8** | 9.4 | 8.4 | 3.6 | 1.7 | – | – | 1 |
| **28 Feb – 27 Mar 2022** | Roy Morgan | 944 | 32 | **38** | 10.5 | 9 | 2 | 4 | 1.5 | 0.5 | 6 |
| **2–7, 14–15 Mar 2022** | Taxpayers' Union–Curia | 1,000 | **36.2** | 35.3 | 12.4 | 11.2 | 0.2 | 1.8 | 0.1 | 0.6 | 0.9 |
| **5–8 Mar 2022** | 1 News–Kantar Public | 1,000 | 37 | **39** | 9 | 8 | 2.3 | 2.2 | 1.3 | 0.9 | 2 |
| **31 Jan – 27 Feb 2022** | Roy Morgan | 963 | 32 | **38** | 11 | 11.5 | 2 | 2 | 1 | 1 | 6 |
| **1–10 Feb 2022** | Taxpayers' Union–Curia | 1,000 | **42.3** | 38.4 | 6.3 | 6.6 | 1 | 1.5 | 2 | – | 3.9 |
| **22 Jan – 4 Feb 2022** | Newshub–Reid Research | 1,000 | **44.3** | 31.3 | 9.6 | 8 | 2 | 1.8 | 1.5 | 1.1 | 13 |
| **4–30 Jan 2022** | Roy Morgan | 951 | 33 | **35** | 10.5 | 13.5 | 2.5 | 2.5 | 1.5 | 1 | 2 |
| **22–26 Jan 2022** | 1 News–Kantar Public | 1,000 | **40** | 32 | 9 | 11 | 1.6 | 1.8 | 1.6 | 1 | 8 |
| **23 Jan 2022** | **Nationwide Red Light restrictions are implemented due to the COVID−19 Omicron variant being detected in the community.** | | | | | | | | | | |
| **10–17 Jan 2022** | Taxpayers' Union–Curia | 1,000 | **41.2** | 33 | 10.7 | 11.5 | 0.5 | 0.9 | 1.1 | – | 8.2 |
| **22 Nov – 19 Dec 2021** | Roy Morgan | 967 | **35.5** | 31.5 | 8.5 | 18.5 | 1 | 2 | 1 | 0.5 | 4 |
| **1–8 Dec 2021** | Taxpayers' Union–Curia | 1,000 | **39.5** | 32.6 | 10.9 | 10.6 | 3 | 2.3 | – | – | 6.9 |
| **2 Dec 2021** | **New Zealand shifts from the COVID-19 alert level system to the new COVID-19 Protection Framework system.** | | | | | | | | | | |
| **30 Nov 2021** | **Christopher Luxon is elected Leader of the National Party with Nicola Willis as his deputy.** | | | | | | | | | | |
| **25 Nov 2021** | **Judith Collins loses the National Party leadership.** | | | | | | | | | | |
| **25 Oct – 21 Nov 2021** | Roy Morgan | 951 | **36** | 26.5 | 10.5 | 17.5 | 3 | 2.5 | 1.5 | 1 | 9.5 |
| **10–17 Nov 2021** | Newshub–Reid Research | 1,000 | **42.7** | 26.9 | 7.2 | 16 | 2.1 | 2.5 | 1.2 | 0.9 | 15.8 |
| **6–10 Nov 2021** | 1 News–Kantar Public | 1,001 | **41** | 28 | 9 | 14 | 0.9 | 3.3 | 1.2 | 1 | 13 |
| **1–8 Nov 2021** | Taxpayers' Union–Curia | 1,000 | **39.3** | 26.2 | 8.6 | 15.9 | 2.3 | 1.7 | – | – | 13.1 |
| **29 Oct – 3 Nov 2021** | Labour–Talbot Mills | 1,023 | **41** | 24 | 9 | 17 | 2.4 | 4.2 | – | – | 17 |
| **27 Sep – 24 Oct 2021** | Roy Morgan | 929 | **39.5** | 26 | 10.5 | 16 | 2 | 2.5 | 1 | 1.5 | 13.5 |
| **3–11 Oct 2021** | Taxpayers' Union–Curia | 1,000 | **44.8** | 22.5 | 6.4 | 16.6 | 1.5 | 3.6 | – | – | 22.3 |
| **28 Sep – 5 Oct 2021** | Labour–Talbot Mills | 1,200+ | **46** | 22 | 7 | 16 | 1.9 | 3.8 | – | – | 24 |
| **30 Aug – 26 Sep 2021** | Roy Morgan | 940 | **45.5** | 23 | 9.5 | 16 | 2 | 1.5 | 1.5 | – | 22.5 |
| **22–26 Sep 2021** | 1 News–Kantar Public | 1,001 | **43** | 26 | 8 | 14 | 2.1 | 2.5 | 1.2 | 1.3 | 17 |
| **5–9 Sep 2021** | Taxpayers' Union–Curia | 1,000 | **45.8** | 21.3 | 9.6 | 14.9 | 1.2 | 2.7 | – | – | 24.5 |
| **31 Aug – 6 Sep 2021** | Labour–Talbot Mills | 1,050 | **45** | 26 | 6 | 13 | 2 | 4.1 | – | – | 19 |
| **26 Jul – 22 Aug 2021** | Roy Morgan | 940 | **39.5** | 25 | 12 | 13 | 2.5 | 2.5 | 2 | – | 14.5 |
| **17 Aug 2021** | **Nationwide Level 4 restrictions are implemented due to the COVID−19 Delta variant being detected in the community.** | | | | | | | | | | |
| **21 Jul – 1 Aug 2021** | Labour–Talbot Mills | 1,216 | **43** | 28 | 7 | 13 | 1.7 | 4.4 | – | – | 15 |
| **22–29 Jul 2021** | Newshub–Reid Research | 1,000 | **43** | 28.7 | 8.5 | 11.1 | 1.9 | 3.4 | 0.8 | 1.6 | 14.3 |
| **28 Jun – 25 Jul 2021** | Roy Morgan | 945 | **39.5** | 29 | 10 | 13 | 2.5 | 2 | 3 | – | 10.5 |
| **24 Jun – 1 Jul 2021** | Labour–Talbot Mills | 1,199 | **48** | 24 | 8 | 11 | 1.5 | 5 | – | – | 24 |
| **31 May – 27 Jun 2021** | Roy Morgan | 927 | **38.5** | 29.5 | 12.5 | 11.5 | 2.5 | 1.5 | 2 | – | 9 |
| **22–26 May 2021** | 1 News–Kantar Public | 1,002 | **46** | 29 | 8 | 9 | 1.8 | 1.2 | 1.8 | 1.5 | 17 |
| **26 Apr – 23 May 2021** | Roy Morgan | 932 | **45** | 28.5 | 11 | 9 | 1.5 | 2 | 1.5 | – | 16.5 |
| **20 May 2021** | **The 2021 Budget is delivered.** | | | | | | | | | | |
| **7–13 May 2021** | Newshub–Reid Research | 1,000 | **52.7** | 27 | 7.1 | 6.9 | 1.2 | 1.9 | 1.3 | 1.2 | 25.7 |
| **29 Mar – 25 Apr 2021** | Roy Morgan | 933 | **41.5** | 29.5 | 13.5 | 9 | 2.5 | 1 | 0.5 | – | 12 |
| **21–28 Mar 2021** | Roy Morgan | 924 | **45.5** | 23 | 12 | 11 | 1 | 2.5 | 2 | – | 22.5 |
| **9–13 Mar 2021** | 1 News–Kantar Public | 1,006 | **49** | 27 | 9 | 8 | 1.5 | 1.8 | 1.2 | 1.4 | 22 |
| **25 Jan – 21 Feb 2021** | Roy Morgan | 924 | **45** | 29 | 13.5 | 7.5 | 1 | 1.5 | 1 | – | 16 |
| **4–24 Jan 2021** | Roy Morgan | 937 | **47** | 25 | 11.5 | 9 | 2 | 2 | 1.5 | – | 22 |
| **23 Nov – 13 Dec 2020** | Roy Morgan | 923 | **44** | 28 | 10.5 | 10 | 2 | 2 | 2 | – | 16 |
| **28 Nov – 2 Dec 2020** | 1 News–Kantar Public | 1,004 | **53** | 25 | 8 | 8 | 1.5 | 1.6 | 0.5 | 1.1 | 28 |
| **26 Oct – 22 Nov 2020** | Roy Morgan | 939 | **44** | 25.5 | 12.5 | 10.5 | 1.5 | 1 | 2 | – | 18.5 |
| **17 Oct 2020** | **2020 election result** | N/A | **50** | 25.6 | 7.9 | 7.6 | 1.2 | 2.6 | 1.5 | 1.5 | 24.4 |
| Date | Polling organisation | Sample size | LAB | NAT | GRN | ACT | TPM | NZF | TOP | NCP | Lead |

== General electorates ==
=== Auckland Central ===
Electorate vote
| Date | Polling organisation | Sample size | GRN | LAB | NAT | ACT | NZF | Lead |
|---|---|---|---|---|---|---|---|---|
| 24 Sep 2023 | Taxpayers' Union–Curia | 500 | 38 | 17 | 36 | 2 | 4 | 2 |
| 17 Oct 2020 | 2020 election result | N/A | 35.10 | 32.13 | 27.16 | 1.63 | 0.76 | 2.97 |

Party vote
| Date | Polling organisation | Sample size | LAB | NAT | ACT | GRN | Lead |
|---|---|---|---|---|---|---|---|
| 24 Sep 2023 | Taxpayers' Union–Curia | 500 | 26 | 37 | 9 | 23 | 11 |
| 17 Oct 2020 | 2020 election result | N/A | 46.02 | 21.10 | 7.48 | 19.06 | 24.92 |

=== Ilam ===
Electorate vote
| Date | Polling organisation | Sample size | LAB | NAT | TOP | GRN | Lead |
|---|---|---|---|---|---|---|---|
| 23 Aug 2023 | Taxpayers' Union–Curia | 400 | 15 | 33 | 14 | 5 | 18 |
| 17 Oct 2020 | 2020 election result | N/A | 45.67 | 37.69 | N/A | 7.51 | 7.98 |

=== Napier ===
Electorate vote
| Date | Polling organisation | Sample size | LAB | NAT | ACT | NZF | Lead |
|---|---|---|---|---|---|---|---|
| 20 Aug 2023 | Taxpayers' Union–Curia | 400 | 37 | 48 | 1 | 5 | 11 |
| 9 Nov 2022 | Curia | 400 | 37 | 45 | 12 | 1 | 8 |
| 17 Oct 2020 | 2020 election result | N/A | 51.06 | 37.04 | N/A | N/A | 18.77 |

Party vote
| Date | Polling organisation | Sample size | LAB | NAT | ACT | Lead |
|---|---|---|---|---|---|---|
| 20 Aug 2023 | Taxpayers' Union–Curia | 400 | 27 | 35 | 17 | 8 |
| 9 Nov 2022 | Curia | 400 | 25 | 43 | 20 | 18 |
| 17 Oct 2020 | 2020 election result | N/A | 50.59 | 27.90 | 8.12 | 12.76 |

=== Northland ===
==== Electorate vote ====
| Date | Polling organisation | Sample size | NAT | LAB | NZF | GRN | DNZ | ACT | Lead |
|---|---|---|---|---|---|---|---|---|---|
| 10 Sep 2023 | Taxpayers' Union-Curia | 400 | 49 | 20 | 15 | 5 | 5 | 3 | 29 |
| 17 Oct 2020 | 2020 election result | N/A | 37.74 | 38.11 | 11.43 | 3.91 | N/A | 2.86 | 0.37 |

=== Tāmaki ===
Electorate vote
| Date | Polling organisation | Sample size | NAT | LAB | GRN | ACT | Lead |
|---|---|---|---|---|---|---|---|
| 18–28 Sep 2023 | Taxpayers' Union–Curia | 400 | 40 | 14 | – | 38 | 2 |
| 20 Jul 2023 | Sentio Group | 700 | 36 | 8 | 6 | 34 | 2 |
| 17 Oct 2020 | 2020 election result | N/A | 51.73 | 32.29 | 7.85 | 5.18 | 19.44 |

Party vote
| Date | Polling organisation | Sample size | LAB | NAT | ACT | GRN | Lead |
|---|---|---|---|---|---|---|---|
| 18–28 Sep 2023 | Taxpayers' Union–Curia | 400 | 20 | 49 | 14 | 8 | 29 |
| 20 Jul 2023 | Sentio Group | 700 | 13 | 49 | 18 | – | 36 |
| 17 Oct 2020 | 2020 election result | N/A | 38.42 | 36.87 | 11.68 | 7.65 | 1.55 |

=== Tauranga ===
An opinion poll was held in the Tauranga electorate prior to the June 2022 Tauranga by-election. The by-election was won by National's Sam Uffindell.

Party vote
| Date | Polling organisation | Sample size | LAB | NAT | ACT | GRN | NZF | TPM | Lead |
|---|---|---|---|---|---|---|---|---|---|
| 18 Jun 2022 | 2022 by-election result | N/A | 25.30 | 55.87 | 10.26 | N/A | N/A | N/A | 30.57 |
| 19–29 May 2022 | Newshub–Reid Research | ? | 27.9 | 51.5 | 7.1 | 2.8 | 2.9 | 4.7 | 23.6 |
| 17 Oct 2020 | 2020 election result | N/A | 42.0 | 32.5 | 8.9 | 5.5 | 3.6 | 0.35 | 9.5 |

=== Wellington Central ===
Electorate vote
| Date | Polling organisation | Sample size | NAT | LAB | GRN | Lead |
|---|---|---|---|---|---|---|
| 3–14 Sep 2023 | Newshub–Reid Research | 500 | 28.0 | 30.6 | 26.6 | 2.6 |
| 17 Oct 2020 | 2020 election result | N/A | 17.76 | 57.26 | 17.54 | 39.50 |

Party vote
| Date | Polling organisation | Sample size | LAB | NAT | GRN | ACT | TOP | TPM | NZF | Lead |
|---|---|---|---|---|---|---|---|---|---|---|
| 3–14 Sep 2023 | Newshub–Reid Research | 500 | 27.8 | 28 | 26.5 | 5.7 | 4.9 | 3 | 2.8 | 0.2 |
| 17 Oct 2020 | 2020 election result | N/A | 43.0 | 14.43 | 30.33 | 4.86 | 3.72 | 0.53 | 1.11 | 12.67 |

== Māori electorates ==
=== Hauraki-Waikato ===
Electorate vote
| Date | Polling organisation | Sample size | LAB | TPM | Lead |
|---|---|---|---|---|---|
| 27 September 2023 | Whakaata Māori–Curia | 500 | 36 | 32 | 4 |
| 17 Oct 2020 | 2020 election result | N/A | 65.26 | 25.57 | 39.69 |

Party vote
| Date | Polling organisation | Sample size | LAB | TPM | NAT | GRN | NZF | ACT | Lead |
|---|---|---|---|---|---|---|---|---|---|
| 27 September 2023 | Whakaata Māori–Curia | 500 | 26 | 26 | 14 | 8 | 6 | 5 | 0 |
| 17 Oct 2020 | 2020 election result | N/A | 63.38 | 12.00 | 3.65 | 6.21 | 3.58 | 1.28 | 51.38 |

=== Ikaroa-Rāwhiti ===
==== Electorate vote ====
| Date | Polling organisation | Sample size | LAB | TPM | Lead |
|---|---|---|---|---|---|
| 21 September 2023 | Whakaata Māori–Curia | 500 | 33 | 25 | 8 |
| 17 Oct 2020 | 2020 election result | N/A | 55.57 | 30.94 | 24.63 |

==== Party vote ====
| Date | Polling organisation | Sample size | LAB | TPM | NAT | GRN | NZF | ACT | Lead |
|---|---|---|---|---|---|---|---|---|---|
| 21 September 2023 | Whakaata Māori–Curia | 500 | 35 | 24 | 11 | 7 | 6 | 4 | 11 |
| 17 Oct 2020 | 2020 election result | N/A | 67.33 | 12.16 | 2.33 | 6.48 | 3.76 | 0.88 | 55.17 |

=== Tāmaki Makaurau ===
==== Electorate vote ====
| Date | Polling organisation | Sample size | LAB | TPM | NAT | GRN | Lead |
|---|---|---|---|---|---|---|---|
| 10 October 2023 | Whakaata Māori–Curia | 500 | 37 | 27 | 9 | 6 | 10 |
| 17 Oct 2020 | 2020 election result | N/A | 39.56 | 35.98 | N/A | 19.31 | 3.58 |

==== Party vote ====
| Date | Polling organisation | Sample size | LAB | TPM | NAT | GRN | NZF | ACT | Lead |
|---|---|---|---|---|---|---|---|---|---|
| 10 October 2023 | Whakaata Māori–Curia | 500 | 35 | 22 | 10 | 9 | 8 | 2 | 13 |
| 17 Oct 2020 | 2020 election result | N/A | 59.98 | 12.7 | 3.21 | 10.46 | 4.34 | 1.06 | 50.01 |

=== Te Tai Hauāuru ===
| Date | Polling organisation | Sample size | LAB | TPM | NAT | Lead |
|---|---|---|---|---|---|---|
| 19 September 2023 | Whakaata Māori–Curia | 500 | 34 | 29 | 12 | 5 |
| 17 Oct 2020 | 2020 election result | N/A | 47.40 | 43.29 | N/A | 4.11 |

==== Party vote ====
| Date | Polling organisation | Sample size | LAB | TPM | NAT | GRN | NZF | ACT | Lead |
|---|---|---|---|---|---|---|---|---|---|
| 19 September 2023 | Whakaata Māori–Curia | 500 | 34 | 22 | 13 | 6 | 7 | 2 | 12 |
| 17 Oct 2020 | 2020 election result | N/A | 61.03 | 15.45 | 2.99 | 6.71 | 3.51 | 1.20 | 45.58 |

=== Te Tai Tokerau ===
| Date | Polling organisation | Sample size | LAB | TPM | GRN | ALC | Lead |
|---|---|---|---|---|---|---|---|
| 5 October 2023 | Whakaata Māori–Curia | 500 | 32 | 26 | 7 | 6 | 6 |
| 17 Oct 2020 | 2020 election result | N/A | 55.07 | 24.96 | N/A | 7.86 | 30.11 |

==== Party vote ====
| Date | Polling organisation | Sample size | LAB | TPM | NAT | GRN | ACT | Lead |
|---|---|---|---|---|---|---|---|---|
| 5 October 2023 | Whakaata Māori–Curia | 500 | 35 | 22 | 8 | 9 | 4 | 13 |
| 17 Oct 2020 | 2020 election result | N/A | 60.06 | 10.18 | 3.61 | 7.35 | 1.31 | 49.88 |

=== Te Tai Tonga ===
==== Electorate vote ====
| Date | Polling organisation | Sample size | LAB | TPM | Lead |
|---|---|---|---|---|---|
| 26 September 2023 | Whakaata Māori–Curia | 500 | 36 | 25 | 9 |
| 17 Oct 2020 | 2020 election result | N/A | 48.88 | 25.41 | 23.47 |

==== Party vote ====
| Date | Polling organisation | Sample size | LAB | TPM | NAT | GRN | NZF | ACT | Lead |
|---|---|---|---|---|---|---|---|---|---|
| 26 September 2023 | Whakaata Māori–Curia | 500 | 31 | 18 | 9 | 14 | 3 | 6 | 13 |
| 17 Oct 2020 | 2020 election result | N/A | 58.70 | 8.69 | 5.64 | 11.54 | 3.45 | 2.75 | 50.01 |

=== Waiariki ===
==== Electorate vote ====
| Date | Polling organisation | Sample size | TPM | LAB | Lead |
|---|---|---|---|---|---|
| 9 October 2023 | Whakaata Māori–Curia | 500 | 50 | 22 | 28 |
| 17 Oct 2020 | 2020 election result | N/A | 46.78 | 43.62 | 3.16 |

==== Party vote ====
| Date | Polling organisation | Sample size | LAB | TPM | NAT | GRN | NZF | ACT | Lead |
|---|---|---|---|---|---|---|---|---|---|
| 9 October 2023 | Whakaata Māori–Curia | 500 | 37 | 29 | 6 | 7 | 4 | 3 | 8 |
| 17 Oct 2020 | 2020 election result | N/A | 60.67 | 17.75 | 2.39 | 5.95 | 3.67 | 0.94 | 42.92 |

== Preferred prime minister ==
Some opinion pollsters ask voters who they would prefer as prime minister. The phrasing of questions and the treatment of refusals, as well as "don't know" answers, differ from poll to poll. To qualify for this table and graph, this person must reach at least 3 percent in three separate polls.

Graph of preferred prime minister opinion polls (as at 10 October 2023). Only includes people who polled at least 3% in three separate polls. Smoothing is set to span 45%.

| Date | Polling organisation | Sample size | Hipkins | Luxon | Seymour | Peters | Ardern | Collins | Lead |
|---|---|---|---|---|---|---|---|---|---|
| 7–10 Oct 2023 | 1 News–Verian | 1,001 | 25 | 25 | 4 | 5 | 0.5 | 0.2 | Tie |
| 5–10 Oct 2023 | Newshub–Reid Research | | 22.2 | 23.6 | 4.2 | 5 | 3.4 | – | 1.4 |
| 1–4 Oct 2023 | Taxpayers’ Union–Curia | 1,000 | 27 | 29 | 4 | 4.3 | 4.5 | – | 2 |
| 30 Sep – 3 Oct 2023 | 1 News–Verian | 1,000 | 25 | 26 | 3 | 4 | 0.4 | – | 1 |
| 23–26 Sep 2023 | 1 News–Verian | 1,002 | 23 | 23 | 5 | 4 | 1 | – | Tie |
| 17–23 Sep 2023 | Newshub–Reid Research | | 19.1 | 24 | 6.1 | 6 | 4.1 | – | 4.9 |
| 16–19 Sep 2023 | 1 News–Verian | 1,001 | 23 | 23 | 5 | 4 | 1 | 0.2 | Tie |
| 9–12 Sep 2023 | 1 News–Verian | 1,002 | 23 | 23 | 5 | 4 | 1 | 0.1 | Tie |
| 3–9 Sep 2023 | Newshub–Reid Research | | 22.5 | 22.5 | 7 | 4.6 | – | – | Tie |
| 28–30 Aug 2023 | The Post–Freshwater Strategy | 1,511 | 45 | 43 | – | – | – | – | 2 |
| 24–30 Aug 2023 | Talbot Mills | | 28 | 26 | 11 | - | - | - | 2 |
| 12–16 Aug 2023 | 1 News–Verian | 1,000 | 21 | 20 | 6 | 3 | 2 | 0.2 | 1 |
| 3–8 Aug 2023 | Taxpayers' Union–Curia | 1,000 | 25 | 25 | 7 | 7 | – | – | Tie |
| 31 Jul – 7 Aug 2023 | Talbot Mills | 1,012 | 34 | 24 | - | - | - | - | 10 |
| 26–31 Jul 2023 | Newshub–Reid Research | | 24 | 15.9 | 10.9 | 4.3 | – | – | 8.1 |
| 8–12 Jul 2023 | 1 News–Verian | 1,000 | 24 | 20 | 7 | 2 | 1 | – | 4 |
| 2–10 Jul 2023 | Taxpayers' Union–Curia | 1,000 | 23 | 20 | 6 | 3.6 | 8 | - | 3 |
| 28 Jun – 2 Jul 2023 | Talbot Mills | 1,036 | 32 | 21 | - | - | - | - | 11 |
| 31 May – 6 Jun 2023 | Taxpayers' Union Curia | 1,000 | 29 | 23 | 7 | 2.8 | 9 | - | 6 |
| 20–24 May 2023 | 1 News–Kantar Public | 1,002 | 25 | 18 | 7 | 2 | 1 | 0.1 | 7 |
| 5–11 May 2023 | Newshub–Reid Research | | 23.4 | 16.4 | 7.5 | 3.6 | 8.5 | – | 7 |
| 27 Apr – 3 May 2023 | Talbot Mills | 1,046 | 32 | 25 | – | – | – | – | 7 |
| 30 Mar – 5 Apr 2023 | Talbot Mills | | 36 | 24 | 11 | – | – | – | 12 |
| 1–9 Mar 2023 | Talbot Mills | 1,021 | 39 | 23 | – | – | – | – | 16 |
| 4–8 Mar 2023 | 1 News–Kantar Public | 1,002 | 27 | 17 | 6 | 3 | 2 | 0.2 | 10 |
| 2–7 Mar 2023 | Taxpayers' Union–Curia | 1,000 | 30 | 21 | 8 | – | 7 | – | 9 |
| 1–9 Feb 2023 | Taxpayers' Union–Curia | 1,000 | 30 | 26 | 8 | 3.5 | 9 | – | 4 |
| 26–31 Jan 2023 | Talbot Mills | | 35 | 27 | 9 | – | – | – | 8 |
| 25–29 Jan 2023 | 1 News–Kantar Public | 1,008 | 23 | 22 | 6 | 2 | 5 | 0.3 | 1 |
| 22–27 Jan 2023 | Newshub–Reid Research | | 19.6 | 18.8 | 8 | 2.9 | 12.4 | – | 0.8 |
| 25 Jan 2023 | Chris Hipkins is sworn in as the 41st Prime Minister of New Zealand. | | | | | | | | |
| 22 Jan 2023 | Chris Hipkins is unanimously elected Leader of the Labour Party. | | | | | | | | |
| 19 Jan 2023 | Jacinda Ardern announces her resignation as Prime Minister of New Zealand, taking effect 25 January 2023. | | | | | | | | |
| 1–6 Dec 2022 | Taxpayers' Union–Curia | 1,000 | | 26.3 | 7.1 | 3.4 | 35.3 | — | 9 |
| 26–30 Nov 2022 | 1 News–Kantar Public | 1,011 | 0.2 | 23 | 6 | 2 | 29 | 0.1 | 6 |
| 3–8 Nov 2022 | Taxpayers' Union–Curia | 1,000 | | 21.1 | 6.1 | 2.5 | 35 | — | 13.9 |
| 31 Oct – 7 Nov 2022 | Talbot Mills | | | 24 | — | – | 40 | – | 16 |
| 25 Oct – 3 Nov 2022 | Newshub–Reid Research | | | 21.5 | 7.3 | 4.2 | 29.9 | – | 8.4 |
| 2–11 Oct 2022 | Taxpayers' Union–Curia | 1,000 | | 22.5 | 7.3 | 3.6 | 32.9 | — | 10.4 |
| 17–21 Sep 2022 | 1 News–Kantar Public | 1,001 | 0.2 | 21 | 4 | 2 | 30 | 0.1 | 9 |
| 1–9 Sep 2022 | Taxpayers' Union–Curia | 1,000 | | 25.9 | 6.6 | 2.6 | 36.5 | — | 10.6 |
| 31 Aug – 7 Sep 2022 | Talbot Mills | | | 26 | — | – | 38 | – | 12 |
| 3–11 Aug 2022 | Taxpayers' Union–Curia | 1,200 | | 19.5 | 7.7 | 4.2 | 39.5 | — | 20 |
| 28 Jul – 8 Aug 2022 | Talbot Mills | | | 26 | 9 | – | 39 | – | 13 |
| 30 Jul – 3 Aug 2022 | 1 News–Kantar Public | 1,023 | 0.2 | 22 | 5 | 2 | 30 | 0.2 | 8 |
| 3–10 Jul 2022 | Taxpayers' Union–Curia | 1,200 | | 22.4 | 6.1 | 2.3 | 41.2 | — | 18.8 |
| 1–12 Jun 2022 | Taxpayers' Union–Curia | 1,200 | | 28 | 5.6 | 3.8 | 39.7 | — | 11.7 |
| 2–10 Jun 2022 | Talbot Mills | 1,200 | | 29 | 8 | | 42 | | 13 |
| 21–25 May 2022 | 1 News–Kantar Public | 1,002 | – | 25 | 3 | 1 | 33 | 0.1 | 8 |
| 4–11 May 2022 | Taxpayers' Union–Curia | 1,000 | | 27.9 | – | – | 35.1 | — | 7.2 |
| 18–27 Apr 2022 | Newshub–Reid Research | | | 23.9 | 5.1 | — | 36.3 | – | 12.4 |
| 7–13 Apr 2022 | Taxpayers' Union–Curia | 1,000 | | 28.6 | 4.8 | 2.6 | 36.3 | — | 7.7 |
| 2–7, 14–15 Mar 2022 | Taxpayers' Union–Curia | 1,000 | | 26.6 | 4.4 | 5.5 | 38.7 | — | 12.1 |
| 5–8 Mar 2022 | 1 News–Kantar Public | 1,000 | 0.3 | 25 | 5 | 2 | 34 | 0.3 | 9 |
| 1–10 Feb 2022 | Taxpayers' Union–Curia | 1,000 | | 28.5 | 2.4 | 1.8 | 38.9 | 1.5 | 10.4 |
| 22 Jan – 4 Feb 2022 | Newshub–Reid Research | | | 17.8 | 7.9 | — | 43.3 | – | 25.5 |
| 22–26 Jan 2022 | 1 News–Kantar Public | 1,000 | 0.1 | 17 | 6 | 1.0 | 35 | 0.2 | 18 |
| 10–17 Jan 2022 | Taxpayers' Union–Curia | 1,000 | | 18.4 | 8.4 | 0.9 | 37.5 | 3.8 | 19.1 |
| 1–8 Dec 2021 | Taxpayers' Union–Curia | 1,000 | | 20.4 | 5.6 | 2.4 | 39.1 | 0.8 | 18.7 |
| 30 Nov 2021 | Christopher Luxon is elected Leader of the National Party. | | | | | | | | |
| 25 Nov 2021 | Judith Collins is removed as National Party leader in a vote of no confidence. | | | | | | | | |
| 10–17 Nov 2021 | Newshub–Reid Research | 1,000 | | 2.5 | 11.9 | — | 41.7 | 6.1 | 29.8 |
| 6–10 Nov 2021 | 1 News–Kantar Public | 1,001 | – | 4 | 11 | 1 | 39 | 5 | 28 |
| 1–8 Nov 2021 | Taxpayers' Union–Curia | 1,000 | | 4.1 | 10.5 | 1.5 | 34 | 6.3 | 23.5 |
| 29 Oct – 3 Nov 2021 | Talbot Mills | 1,023 | | 2 | 15 | — | 47 | 10 | 32 |
| 3–11 Oct 2021 | Taxpayers' Union–Curia | 1,000 | | 2.3 | 12.3 | 1.3 | 47.2 | 5.2 | 34.9 |
| 28 Sep – 5 Oct 2021 | Talbot Mills | 1,200+ | | – | 16 | — | 51 | 9 | 35 |
| 22–26 Sep 2021 | 1 News–Kantar Public | 1,001 | 0.1 | 3 | 11 | 0.7 | 44 | 5 | 33 |
| 5–9 Sep 2021 | Taxpayers' Union–Curia | 1,000 | | 3.3 | 9.3 | 1.5 | 50.8 | 4.4 | 41.5 |
| 31 Aug – 6 Sep 2021 | Talbot Mills | 1,050 | | 1.3 | 14 | — | 55 | 13 | 41 |
| 21 Jul – 1 Aug 2021 | Talbot Mills | 1,216 | | 2.1 | 14 | — | 50 | 11 | 36 |
| 22–29 Jul 2021 | Newshub–Reid Research | 1,000 | | – | 8.6 | — | 45.5 | 8.2 | 36.9 |
| 24 Jun – 1 Jul 2021 | Talbot Mills | 1,199 | | – | 12 | — | 55 | 10 | 43 |
| 22–26 May 2021 | 1 News–Kantar Public | 1,002 | – | 3 | 6 | 1 | 48 | 9 | 39 |
| 7–13 May 2021 | Newshub–Reid Research | 1,000 | | 2.4 | — | — | 48.1 | 5.6 | 42.5 |
| 9–13 Mar 2021 | 1 News–Kantar Public | 1,006 | – | 2 | 4 | 0.7 | 43 | 8 | 35 |
| 28 Nov – 2 Dec 2020 | 1 News–Kantar Public | 1,004 | 0.3 | 2 | 4 | 1 | 58 | 12 | 46 |

== Government approval rating ==
The government approval rating is a statistic which measures the proportion of people who say they think the country is heading in the right direction or wrong direction politically.

Graph of government approval rating polls (as at 31 August 2023). Smoothing is set to span 65%.

| Date | Polling organisation | Sample size | Right direction | Wrong direction | Do not know | Lead |
|---|---|---|---|---|---|---|
| 4 Sep – 8 Oct 2023 | Roy Morgan | – | 38 | 45 | 17 | 7 |
| 31 Jul – 27 Aug 2023 | Roy Morgan | 1,046 | 32 | 56 | 12 | 23 |
| 28–30 Aug 2023 | The Post–Freshwater Strategy | 1,511 | 21 | 63 | 15 | 42 |
| 31 Jul – 7 Aug 2023 | Talbot Mills | 1,012 | 37 | 55 | 8 | 18 |
| 2–6 Aug 2023 | Guardian Essential | 1,163 | 31 | 55 | 14 | 24 |
| 26 Jun – 23 Jul 2023 | Roy Morgan | 937 | 29 | 60.5 | 10.5 | 31.5 |
| 2–10 Jul 2023 | Taxpayers' Union–Curia | 1,000 | 22.1 | 64.5 | 13.4 | 42.4 |
| 29 May – 25 Jun 2023 | Roy Morgan | 955 | 38 | 54 | 8 | 16 |
| 24 Apr – 21 May 2023 | Roy Morgan | 952 | 34.5 | 54.5 | 11 | 20 |
| 27 Apr – 3 May 2023 | Talbot Mills | 1,046 | 40 | 52 | 8 | 12 |
| 27 Mar – 23 Apr 2023 | Roy Morgan | 929 | 35 | 55 | 10 | 20 |
| 27 Feb – 26 Mar 2023 | Roy Morgan | 945 | 38.5 | 52.5 | 9 | 14 |
| 30 Jan – 26 Feb 2023 | Roy Morgan | 943 | 42.5 | 47.5 | 10 | 5 |
| 9–29 Jan 2023 | Roy Morgan | 948 | 40 | 49 | 11 | 9 |
| Dec 2022 | Roy Morgan | 947 | 32 | 57 | 11 | 25 |
| 31 Oct – 27 Nov 2022 | Roy Morgan | 926 | 35 | 55 | 10 | 20 |
| 31 Oct – 7 Nov 2022 | Talbot Mills | | 41 | 49 | 10 | 8 |
| 26 Sep – 23 Oct 2022 | Roy Morgan | 951 | 42 | 50 | 8 | 8 |
| 2–11 Oct 2022 | Taxpayers' Union–Curia | 1,000 | 29 | 56 | 15 | 27 |
| 29 Aug – 25 Sep 2022 | Roy Morgan | 942 | 37.5 | 51.5 | 11 | 14 |
| 1–9 Sep 2022 | Taxpayers' Union–Curia | 1,000 | 32 | 54 | 14 | 22 |
| 31 Aug – 7 Sep 2022 | Talbot Mills | | 44 | 49 | 7 | 5 |
| 25 Jul – 21 Aug 2022 | Roy Morgan | 947 | 37.5 | 53 | 9.5 | 15.5 |
| 28 Jul – 8 Aug 2022 | Talbot Mills | | 42 | 50 | 8 | 8 |
| 27 Jul – 24 Jul 2022 | Roy Morgan | 937 | 40.5 | 51 | 8.5 | 10.5 |
| 30 May – 26 Jun 2022 | Roy Morgan | 947 | 39 | 51.5 | 9.5 | 12.5 |
| 1–12 Jun 2022 | Taxpayers' Union–Curia | 1,200 | 36 | 50 | 14 | 14 |
| 2–10 Jun 2022 | Talbot Mills | 1,200 | 50 | 42 | 8 | 8 |
| 26 Apr – 22 May 2022 | Roy Morgan | 934 | 40 | 50 | 10 | 10 |
| 4–11 May 2022 | Taxpayers' Union–Curia | 1,000 | 34 | 48 | 18 | 14 |
| 29 Apr – 10 May 2022 | Talbot Mills | | 51 | 40 | 9 | 11 |
| 28 Mar – 24 Apr 2022 | Roy Morgan | 913 | 43 | 49.5 | 7.5 | 6.5 |
| 28 Feb – 27 Mar 2022 | Roy Morgan | 944 | 39 | 51.5 | 9.5 | 12.5 |
| 31 Jan – 27 Feb 2022 | Roy Morgan | 963 | 42.5 | 47.5 | 10 | 5 |
| 4–30 Jan 2022 | Roy Morgan | 951 | 48.5 | 42 | 9.5 | 6.5 |
| 22 Nov – 19 Dec 2021 | Roy Morgan | 967 | 42.5 | 44.5 | 13 | 2 |
| 25 Oct – 21 Nov 2021 | Roy Morgan | 951 | 46 | 44.5 | 9.5 | 1.5 |
| 1–8 Nov 2021 | Taxpayers' Union–Curia | 1,000 | 44 | 45 | 11 | 1 |
| 27 Sep – 24 Oct 2021 | Roy Morgan | 929 | 48 | 38.5 | 13.5 | 9.5 |
| 28 Sep – 5 Oct 2021 | Talbot Mills | 1,200 | 63 | 30 | 7 | 33 |
| 30 Aug – 26 Sep 2021 | Roy Morgan | 940 | 57 | 32 | 11 | 25 |
| 26 Jul – 22 Aug 2021 | Roy Morgan | 940 | 52.5 | 37.5 | 10 | 15 |
| 28 Jun – 25 Jul 2021 | Roy Morgan | 945 | 55.5 | 34.5 | 10 | 21 |
| 31 May – 27 Jun 2021 | Roy Morgan | 927 | 57 | 33 | 10 | 24 |
| 26 Apr – 23 May 2021 | Roy Morgan | 932 | 62.5 | 28.5 | 9 | 34 |
| 29 Mar – 25 Apr 2021 | Roy Morgan | 933 | 62.5 | 26.5 | 11 | 36 |
| 21–28 Mar 2021 | Roy Morgan | 924 | 61.5 | 26 | 12.5 | 35.5 |
| 25 Jan – 21 Feb 2021 | Roy Morgan | 924 | 69.5 | 20 | 10.5 | 49.5 |
| 4–24 Jan 2021 | Roy Morgan | 937 | 71.5 | 18.5 | 10 | 53 |
| 23 Nov – 13 Dec 2020 | Roy Morgan | 923 | 71.5 | 18 | 10.5 | 53.5 |
| 26 Oct – 22 Nov 2020 | Roy Morgan | 939 | 69.5 | 20 | 10.5 | 49.5 |

== Forecasts ==
The use of mixed-member proportional representation allows ready conversion of a party's support into a party vote percentage and therefore a number of seats in Parliament. Projections generally assume no material change to the electorate seats held by each party (ACT retains Epsom, Greens retain Auckland Central, Māori retains Waiariki, etc.). However, projections that show the Labour Party winning fewer than 46 or 45 total seats (46 being the number of electorate seats held by Labour during the 53rd Parliament, then 45 after the 2022 Hamilton West by-election) assume that Labour will lose at least enough electorates to avoid an overhang. Parties that do not hold an electorate seat and poll below 5% are assumed to win zero seats.

When determining the scenarios for the overall result, the minimum parties necessary to form majority governments are listed (provided parties have indicated openness to working together). Actual governments formed may include other parties beyond the minimum required for a majority; this happened after the 2014 election, when National only needed one seat from another party to reach a 61-seat majority, but instead chose to form a 64-seat government with Māori, ACT and United Future.

On 19 November 2022, New Zealand First leader Winston Peters ruled out a coalition with Labour, claiming "No one gets to lie to me twice". In April 2023, National leader Christopher Luxon commented that it would be "highly unlikely" that National would form a government with Te Pāti Māori or the Greens; however, a spokesperson later clarified Luxon had not "intended to fully rule out working" with either party. At the time, Te Pāti Māori was largely seen as the kingmaker in the upcoming election. Furthermore, Te Pāti Māori may not be prepared to support a National-led government that includes the ACT Party, as Te Pāti Māori has repeatedly accused the ACT Party of race baiting over co-governance and its calls for a referendum on the Treaty of Waitangi. On 10 May, Luxon officially ruled out forming a coalition with Te Pāti Māori. On 27 August, Labour leader Chris Hipkins ruled out New Zealand First as a possible coalition partner.

| Source | Seats in parliament (Note: Forecasted seats are calculated using the Electoral Commission's MMP seat allocation calculator, based on polling results.) | | | | | | | Likely government formation(s) |
| Source | LAB | NAT | GRN | ACT | TPM | NZF | Total | Likely government formation(s) |
|---|---|---|---|---|---|---|---|---|
| 2023 election result 14 Oct 2023 | 34 | 48 | 15 | 11 | 6 | 8 | 122 | National–ACT–NZ First (67) |
| 1 News–Verian 7–10 Oct 2023 poll | 35 | 47 | 17 | 11 | 2 | 8 | 120 | National–ACT–NZ First (66) |
| Newshub–Reid Research 5–10 Oct 2023 poll | 35 | 43 | 19 | 11 | 3 | 9 | 120 | National–ACT–NZ First (63) |
| Guardian Essential 4–8 Oct 2023 poll | 39 | 44 | 14 | 10 | 2 | 11 | 120 | National–ACT–NZ First (65) |
| Roy Morgan 4 Sep – 8 Oct 2023 poll | 33 | 39 | 19 | 15 | 4 | 10 | 120 | National–ACT–NZ First (64) |
| Taxpayers' Union–Curia 1–4 Oct 2023 poll | 35 | 46 | 13 | 12 | 5 | 9 | 120 | National–ACT–NZ First (67) |
| Talbot Mills 22–28 Sep 2023 poll | 34 | 47 | 16 | 11 | 4 | 8 | 120 | National–ACT–NZ First (66) |
| The Post/Freshwater Strategy 28–30 Aug 2023 poll | 34 | 46 | 15 | 14 | 4 | 7 | 120 | National–ACT–NZ First (67) |

== See also ==
- 2020 New Zealand general election
- Opinion polling for the 2020 New Zealand general election
- Opinion polling for the 2026 New Zealand general election
- Politics of New Zealand
