= 2017 New Zealand Labour Party leadership election =

New Zealand party leadership election

- 1 August 2017

>50% of votes in an electoral college required to win
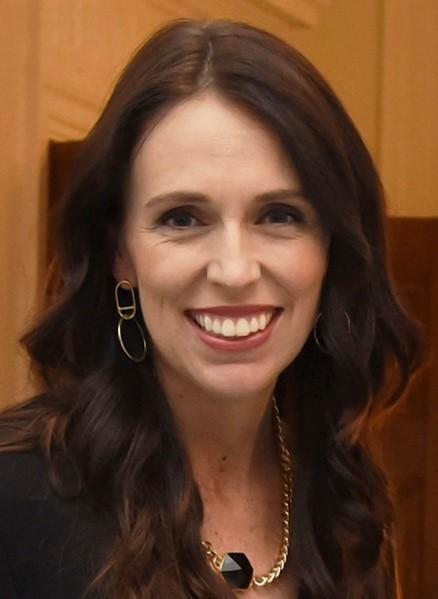
Candidate	Jacinda Ardern
Leader's seat	List
Popular vote	Unopposed
Leader before election
Andrew Little
Elected Leader
Jacinda Ardern

The 2017 New Zealand Labour Party leadership election was held on 1 August 2017 to choose the next Leader of the New Zealand Labour Party. The election was won by Deputy Leader and Mount Albert MP Jacinda Ardern.

== Background ==
Labour leader Andrew Little had led Labour since 2014 and, after several poor results, announced his intention to retire from the leadership on 1 August 2017, following intense media speculation. According to Ardern, Little had previously approached her on her birthday, 26 July, and stated he thought she should take over as party leader, as he was of the opinion he could not turn things around for Labour. Ardern said she had refused, telling him to "stick it out".

== Result ==
As Ardern was the only officially nominated candidate, she was universally elected as party leader and took over Little's role as Leader of the Opposition as well. Kelvin Davis was then elected unopposed as deputy leader filling the vacancy caused by Ardern's elevation. At 37, Ardern became the youngest leader of the Labour Party. She is also the second woman to lead the party after Helen Clark. Ardern's tenure as leader began just eight weeks before the 2017 general election, and at a press conference following her election as leader, she said that the forthcoming election campaign would be one of "relentless positivity".

== Outcome ==
Immediately following the announcement that Ardern had been elected leader, Labour was inundated with donations by the public, at their peak reaching NZ$700 per minute. Ardern's election was followed by a spate of positive coverage from many sections of the media, including international outlets such as CNN, with commentators referring to a 'Jacinda effect' and 'Jacindamania'. Labour also rose dramatically upon Ardern's elevation to the leadership; by late August they had risen to 43 per cent in the Colmar Brunton poll (having been 24 per cent before the leadership change) as well as managing to overtake National in opinion polls for the first time in over a decade. In the last week of the campaign, the party dropped in the polls, and achieved second place behind National in the preliminary results of the 23 September election. However National did not secure a majority, leaving New Zealand First as kingmaker, which negotiated with both parties about a coalition agreement. On 19 October 2017, it was announced that Labour had formed a government with New Zealand First and the Greens, and making Ardern Prime Minister.

Andrew Little was later lauded by Labour supporters for putting aside his personal ambition to allow Ardern to lead Labour, which saw a swift reversal of fortunes. His decision was labelled a "selfless masterstroke" and he was praised for his integrity and selflessness. Little acknowledged later that the decision to stand aside was a painful one but got over it quickly knowing that his move had paid off for Labour. He was then elected as a Cabinet Minister by the Labour caucus following Labour's formation of a government.

== See also ==
- 2017 New Zealand general election
- Shadow Cabinet of Jacinda Ardern
